= Jim Ryan (American football coach) =

American football coach (born 1975)

Biographical details
- Born: July 10, 1975 (age 51); Cañon City, Colorado, U.S.
- Education: University of Southern Colorado (2000); University of Central Missouri (2008)

Coaching career (HC unless noted)
- c. 1990s: Cañon City HS (CO) (assistant)
- 2000: Fort Lewis (DL)
- 2000: Delta State (GA)
- 2001: North Alabama (GA)
- 2002: Colorado College (DC)
- 2003–2007: Illinois College (DC)
- 2008–2009: Washington University (assistant)
- 2010–2011: Washington University (ST)
- 2012–2015: Washington University (DC)
- 2016–2019: Rhodes

Head coaching record
- Overall: 16–24

Accomplishments and honors

Awards
- AFCA NCAA Division III Assistant Coach of the Year (2015)

Jim Ryan (born July 10, 1975) is an American former college football coach. He was the head football coach for Rhodes College from 2016 to 2019.

Ryan graduated from Cañon City High School in 1993, where he also played high school football. After graduating, he returned as an assistant coach under his head coach, Lee Hitchcock.

From 2000 to 2007, Ryan served as an assistant coach for Fort Lewis, Delta State, North Alabama, Colorado College, and Illinois College. In 2008, he joined Washington University as an assistant. In 2010, he was promoted to special teams coordinator. In 2012, he was again promoted, this time to defensive coordinator. After the 2015 season he was named as the American Football Coaches Association (AFCA) NCAA Division III Assistant Coach of the Year. In four seasons as defensive coordinator, Washington University secured University Athletic Association (UAA) championships in 2012, 2013, and 2015. In 2013, the team finished 19th nationally in total defense.

In December 2015, Ryan was named as the head football coach for Rhodes, succeeding Dan Gritti. In four seasons as head coach, Ryan amassed an overall record of 16–24.

== Head coaching record ==
Year	Team	Overall	Conference	Standing	Bowl/playoffs
Rhodes Lynx (Southern Athletic Association) (2016–2019)
2016	Rhodes	6–4	4–4	T–5th	
2017	Rhodes	4–6	3–5	5th	
2018	Rhodes	5–5	3–5	T–5th	
2019	Rhodes	1–9	1–7	8th	
Rhodes:		16–24	11–22		
Total:		16–24			
