= Chuck Walton =

American gridiron football player (1941–1998)

No. 52, 63
- Position: Guard

Personal information
- Born: July 7, 1941; Shattuck, Oklahoma, U.S.
- Died: October 4, 1998 (aged 57); Shattuck, Oklahoma, U.S.
- Listed height: 6 ft 3 in (1.91 m)
- Listed weight: 253 lb (115 kg)

Career information
- High school: Cañon City (Cañon City, Colorado)
- College: Iowa State (1959–1962)
- NFL draft: 1963: 4th round, 55th overall pick
- AFL draft: 1963: 13th round, 98th overall pick

Career history
- Montreal Alouettes (1963–1964); Hamilton Tiger-Cats (1965–1966); Detroit Lions (1967–1974); Denver Broncos (1975)*
- * Offseason or practice squad member only

Awards and highlights
- Grey Cup champion (1965); CFL All-Star (1966); 3× CFL Eastern All-Star (1963, 1965, 1966)

Career NFL statistics
- Games played: 98
- Games started: 93
- Fumble recoveries: 3
- Stats at Pro Football Reference

Charles Richard Walton (July 7, 1941 – October 6, 1998) was an American football guard who played eight seasons in the National Football League (NFL) for the Detroit Lions. Previously he played for the Montreal Alouettes and the Hamilton Tiger-Cats of the Canadian Football League (CFL). Walton played college football at Iowa State University.

Walton was one of four football players from Iowa State who appeared in scenes in the 1968 movie Paper Lion.
