= Cat Ballou =

1965 film by Elliot Silverstein

- Theatrical release poster
- Directed by: Elliot Silverstein
- Written by: Walter Newman; Frank Pierson
- Based on: The Ballad of Cat Ballou; 1956 novel by Roy Chanslor
- Produced by: Harold Hecht
- Starring: Jane Fonda; Lee Marvin; Michael Callan; Dwayne Hickman; Nat King Cole; Stubby Kaye
- Cinematography: Jack A. Marta
- Edited by: Charles Nelson
- Music by: Frank De Vol (score); Mack David (songs); Jerry Livingston (songs)
- Production company: Harold Hecht Corporation
- Distributed by: Columbia Pictures
- Release dates: May 7, 1965 (Denver); June 18, 1965 (Los Angeles)
- Running time: 96 minutes
- Country: United States
- Language: English
- Box office: $20.7 million

Cat Ballou is a 1965 American Western comedy film starring Jane Fonda and Lee Marvin, who won an Academy Award for his dual role. The story involves a woman who hires a notorious gunman to protect her father's ranch and later to avenge his murder, only to find that the gunman is not who she expected. The supporting cast features Tom Nardini, Michael Callan, Dwayne Hickman, with Nat King Cole (in his final film appearance) and Stubby Kaye, who together perform the film's theme song, in addition to appearing throughout the film in the form of travelling minstrels or troubadours as a kind of musical Greek chorus and framing device.

The film was directed by Elliot Silverstein from a screenplay by Walter Newman and Frank Pierson, adapted from the 1956 novel The Ballad of Cat Ballou by Roy Chanslor, who also wrote the novel filmed as Johnny Guitar. Chanslor's novel was a serious Western, and though it was turned into a comedy for the film, the filmmakers retained some darker elements. The film references many classic Western films, notably Shane. The film was selected by the American Film Institute as the 10th-greatest Western of all time in its AFI's 10 Top 10 list in 2008.

== Plot ==
Catherine "Cat" Ballou, a notorious outlaw, is set to be hanged in the small town of Wolf City, Wyoming. Two banjo- and guitar-playing "Shouters", Professor Sam the Shade and the Sunrise Kid, sing the ballad of Cat Ballou and regale the audience with the tale of how she began her career of crime.

Some months prior, Catherine, then an aspiring schoolteacher, is returning home by train to Wolf City from finishing school. On the way, she unwittingly helps accused cattle rustler Clay Boone elude his captor, Sheriff Maledon, when Boone's Uncle Jed, disguised as a preacher, distracts the lawman.

Arriving home at her father Frankie Ballou's ranch, Catherine learns that the Wolf City Development Corporation is scheming to take his ranch. Frankie's sole defender is his ranch hand, educated Native American Jackson Two-Bears. Clay and Jed appear and reluctantly offer to help Catherine. She hires legendary gunfighter Kid Shelleen to help protect her father from gunslinger Tim Strawn, the tin-nosed hired killer, who is threatening him.

Shelleen arrives and proves to be a drunken bum, who is a crack shot only when he is inebriated. His presence proves to be useless, as Strawn abruptly kills Frankie. When the townspeople refuse to bring Strawn to justice, Catherine becomes a revenge-seeking outlaw, known as Cat Ballou. Her gang and she rob a train carrying the Wolf City payroll, then take refuge in the desperado hideout "Hole-in-the-Wall". Shelleen is shocked to discover the legendary outlaw Cassidy is now a humble saloonkeeper in Hole-in-the-Wall.

The gang is thrown out when it is learned what they have done, due to Hole-in-the-Wall's continued existence being dependent on the sufferance of Wolf City. Strawn arrives and threatens Cat. Shelleen, motivated by his affection for Cat, works himself into shape. Dressed up in his finest gunfighter outfit, he goes into town and kills Strawn, then reveals he is Strawn's brother.

Cat poses as a prostitute and confronts Sir Harry Percival, the head of the Wolf City Development Corporation. She attempts to force him into confessing that he ordered her father's murder. A struggle ensues; Sir Harry is killed, and Cat is sentenced to be hanged. With Sir Harry dead, Wolf City's future is hopeless, and the townspeople have no mercy for Cat. As the noose is placed around her neck, Uncle Jed, again disguised as a preacher, appears and cuts the rope just as the trapdoor opens. Cat safely falls through and onto a wagon, and her gang spirits her away in a daring rescue.

== Cast ==
- Jane Fonda as Cat Ballou
- Lee Marvin as Shelleen and Strawn
- Michael Callan as Clay Boone
- Dwayne Hickman as Jed
- Nat King Cole as one of the shouters (Note: Nat King Cole and Stubby Kaye (who introduce each other's character, in the opening song, as Sunrise Kid and Sam the Shade, respectively), are billed simply as "Shouters", acting as a Greek chorus. They intermittently appear onscreen to narrate the story through ongoing verses of the ballad, one of the songs written by Mack David and Jerry Livingston for the film.)
- Stubby Kaye as one of the shouters
- Tom Nardini as Jackson Two-Bears
- John Marley as Frankie Ballou
- Reginald Denny as Sir Harry Percival
- Jay C. Flippen as Sheriff Cardigan
- Arthur Hunnicutt as Butch Cassidy
- Bruce Cabot as Sheriff Maledon
- Burt Mustin as the accuser
- Paul Gilbert as Train Messenger

== Production ==
Cat Ballou was director Elliot Silverstein's second feature film, with the pressure of filming leading to some quarrels with producer Harold Hecht, although the film was ultimately a box-office success.

Ann-Margret was the first choice for the title role, but her manager turned it down without letting the actress know. Ann-Margret wrote in her autobiography that she would have taken the part. Among others, Kirk Douglas and Dick Van Dyke turned down the role of Shelleen. Michael Callan was under contract to Columbia.

The film was shot on location in Colorado, including parts of Canon City and Texas Creek, as well as the ghost towns of Rosita and Buckskin Joe. It was also filmed around the Tunnel Drive Trail and the Wet Mountain Valley.

Nat King Cole was ill with lung cancer during the filming of Cat Ballou. A chain smoker, Cole died four months before the film was released.

Jay C. Flippen suffered a circulatory failure during filming, and as a result, later had his leg amputated due to gangrene.

== Reception ==
=== Box office ===
Cat Ballou earned over $20.6 million in North America, making it the 7th-highest-grossing film of 1965.

=== Critical response ===
On the review aggregator website Rotten Tomatoes, 90% of 31 critics' reviews are positive, with an average rating of 7.3/10. Metacritic, which uses a weighted average, assigned the film a score of 60 out of 100, based on 7 critics, indicating "mixed or average" reviews.

Bosley Crowther of The New York Times called it "a breezy little film", which "does have flashes of good satiric wit. But, under Elliott Silverstein's direction, it is mostly just juvenile lampoon." Variety wrote that the film "emerges middlingly successful, sparked by an amusing way-out approach and some sparkling performances." Richard L. Coe of The Washington Post praised the film as a "springy satire", adding, "What makes this fun is the style. Forming a mighty cool duo, Nat King Cole and Stubby Kaye sing their way in and out of the plot with folk songs, which Cole 'Don't Fence Me In' Porter would have relished. The format is novel and stylishly delivered." Pauline Kael in Film Quarterly called it "lumpen, coy, and obvious, a self-consciously cute movie," adding that "mainly it is full of sort-of-funny and trying-to-be-funny ideas and a movie is not just ideas." Philip K. Scheuer of the Los Angeles Times wrote, "I'm in the minority, apparently. Cat Ballou, which is being hailed as a cowboy Tom Jones or something of the sort, seems to me about as funny as a soundtrack burp." The Monthly Film Bulletin wrote, "The jokes in Cat Ballou are uneven, but the mood behind the film is happily consistent."

=== Awards and nominations ===
Award	Category	Nominee(s)	Result	Ref.
Academy Awards	Best Actor	Lee Marvin	Won	
Academy Awards	Best Screenplay – Based on Material from Another Medium	Walter Newman and Frank Pierson	Nominated	
Academy Awards	Best Film Editing	Charles Nelson	Nominated	
Academy Awards	Best Original Score	Frank De Vol	Nominated	
Academy Awards	Best Song	"The Ballad of Cat Ballou"; Music by Jerry Livingston; Lyrics by Mack David	Nominated	
Berlin International Film Festival	Golden Bear	Elliot Silverstein	Nominated	
Berlin International Film Festival	Best Actor	Lee Marvin	Won	
Berlin International Film Festival	Special Mention	Walter Newman and Frank Pierson	Won	
Berlin International Film Festival	Youth Film Award – Honorable Mention	Elliot Silverstein	Won	
British Academy Film Awards	Best Foreign Actor	Lee Marvin	Won	
British Academy Film Awards	Best Foreign Actress	Jane Fonda	Nominated	
British Academy Film Awards	Most Promising Newcomer to Leading Film Roles	Tom Nardini	Nominated	
Directors Guild of America Awards	Outstanding Directorial Achievement in Motion Pictures	Elliot Silverstein	Nominated	
Golden Globe Awards	Best Motion Picture – Musical or Comedy		Nominated	
Golden Globe Awards	Best Actor in a Motion Picture – Musical or Comedy	Lee Marvin	Won	
Golden Globe Awards	Best Actress in a Motion Picture – Musical or Comedy	Jane Fonda	Nominated	
Golden Globe Awards	Best Original Song – Motion Picture	"The Ballad of Cat Ballou"; Music by Jerry Livingston; Lyrics by Mack David	Nominated	
Golden Globe Awards	Most Promising Newcomer – Male	Tom Nardini	Nominated	
Laurel Awards	Top Comedy		Won	
Laurel Awards	Top Male Comedy Performance	Lee Marvin	Nominated	
Laurel Awards	Top Female Comedy Performance	Jane Fonda	Won	
Laurel Awards	Top Song	"The Ballad of Cat Ballou"; Music by Jerry Livingston; Lyrics by Mack David	Nominated	
National Board of Review Awards	Best Actor	Lee Marvin (also for Ship of Fools)	Won	
New York Film Critics Circle Awards	Best Actor	Lee Marvin	Nominated	
Writers Guild of America Awards	Best Written American Comedy	Walter Newman and Frank Pierson	Nominated	

In his Academy Award acceptance speech, Lee Marvin concluded by saying: "I think, though, that half of this belongs to a horse somewhere out in San Fernando Valley", a reference to the horse Kid Shelleen rode, which appeared to be as drunk as Shelleen was.

=== American Film Institute ===
- 1998: AFI's 100 Years...100 Movies – Nominated
- 2000: AFI's 100 Years...100 Laughs – #50
- 2003: AFI's 100 Years...100 Heroes & Villains:
  - Tim Strawn – Nominated Villain
- 2004: AFI's 100 Years...100 Songs:
  - "The Ballad of Cat Ballou" – Nominated
- 2007: AFI's 100 Years...100 Movies (10th Anniversary Edition) – Nominated
- 2008: AFI's 10 Top 10:
  - #10 Western Film

== Television pilots ==
Two separate television pilots were filmed. A 1970 pilot, written and produced by Aaron Ruben, featured Lesley Ann Warren as Cat, Jack Elam as Kid Shelleen, and Tom Nardini repeating his role, while a 1971 pilot starred Jo Ann Harris as Cat, Forrest Tucker as Kid Shelleen, and Lee J. Casey as Jackson Two-Bears.

== In popular culture ==
- Cat Ballou is the favorite film of comedy directors Bobby and Peter Farrelly, as stated in the AFI 100 Years, 100 Laughs television special. The Balladeers from their film, There's Something About Mary, are inspired by similar characters in Cat Ballou.
- Imagery from the hanging scene of Jane Fonda was spoofed advocating her execution for treason, following her 1972 visit to Hanoi. A brief test shot from that scene was used as part of Alex DeLarge's sadistic reverie in the movie A Clockwork Orange.
- "Cat Ballou" is a card in the spaghetti Western board game Bang!
- In a 2014 interview on NPR, actor Bryan Cranston called Cat Ballou the "movie that had the most impact" on him when he was growing up.
- Part of the opening animation of the Columbia logo featuring Jane Fonda was incorporated in the beginning of Spider-Man: Into the Spider-Verse (2018).
- In episode 69 of the popular fiction podcast Welcome to Night Vale, Cecil Palmer mentions that he watched this movie with his boyfriend Carlos the Scientist repeatedly. Later episodes confirm that Cecil is a fan of the film, and episode 192, "It Doesn't Hold Up" features Cecil discussing the film.

== See also ==
- List of American films of 1965
