= Lynching of George Witherell =

1888 lynching in Colorado

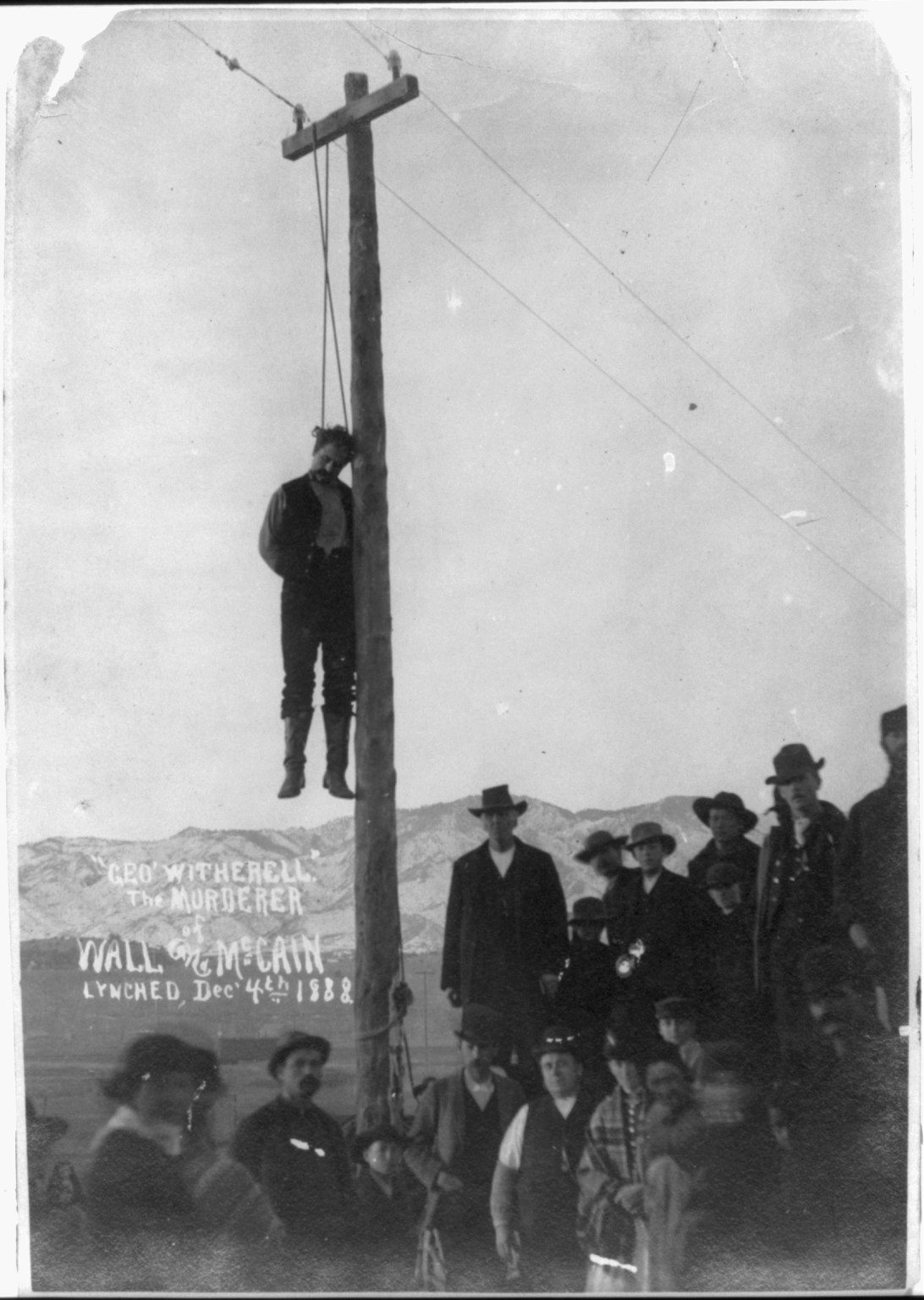
The body of George Witherell hanging from a telephone pole in Cañon City, Colorado, after being lynched on December 4, 1888.

On December 4, 1888, a vigilante mob in Cañon City, Colorado, lynched serial killer George Witherell.

== Background ==
In 1871, George Witherell and his accomplice, Eugene Wright, were involved in the murder of L. K. Wall in Elbert County, Colorado. Witherell bludgeoned Wall to death with a rifle, and both men subsequently covered Wall's body with stones before selling the sheep. Following the discovery of Wall's body, Witherell and Wright were identified as suspects. They were apprehended in Nebraska, where a confrontation with a police officer resulted in Wright being wounded. Both men were extradited to Denver, convicted, and sentenced to life imprisonment. In 1876, Wright escaped from jail, while Witherell served 16 years before being released for good conduct in 1887.

Upon his release, Witherell encountered Charles R. McCain in Beaver Creek, Colorado. Witherell hired McCain to transport ore to the Denver mine, falsely claiming ownership of the mine and intending to steal McCain's possessions, which included a wagon, mules, and several hundred dollars. On their first night, Witherell murdered McCain while he slept, dragging the body into a mountain canyon and covering it with stones. Witherell then returned to Denver with McCain's possessions and sold them. When McCain's family reported the absence of McCain, Witherell was held as a suspect and arrested in Denver. After McCain's remains were discovered, the Fremont County sheriff, Griffith, headed to Denver to take Witherell back home. Griffith feared Witherell would be lynched if he arrived in Cañon City, delaying his departure to abate the outrage. He left Denver and quietly arrived at the Fremont County jail in Cañon City.

Throughout his criminal career, George Witherell was accused of committing six murders across Colorado. He stood accused of murdering two Swedes whose belongings he was found with, one of whom was named Marinus Jansen, in September 1888 in Silverton, and of the murders of Jamie Hand and his grandmother in El Paso County in June 1888.

== Lynching ==
Sheriff Griffith believed he had arrived in Cañon City with George Witherell undetected. However, this assumption proved incorrect when a vigilante mob assembled outside the jail and demanded Witherell's release. Despite Griffith's efforts to defuse the situation peacefully, tensions escalated.

At approximately 4:00 a.m., a larger group of masked men appeared at the jail and knocked on the door. Unaware of their true intentions, Sheriff Griffith opened it and was immediately overpowered and restrained. His 15-year-old son, who was present at the time, attempted to intervene but was coerced into unlocking Witherell's cell under threat. As the mob forced its way into the cell, Witherell tried to defend himself using a bed leg but was shot in the shoulder and subdued. The assailants placed a rope around his neck, dragged him outside, and hanged him from a telephone pole. No legal action was taken against those responsible for the lynching.

== See also ==
- List of serial killers in the United States
- Lynching in the United States
