= Skyline Drive (disambiguation) =

Skyline Drive is a 105-mile (169 km) road that runs the entire length of the Shenandoah National Park in the Blue Ridge Mountains of Virginia, United States.

Skyline Drive may also refer to:

- Skyline Drive (Colorado), in Cañon City, Colorado
- Skyline Drive (New Jersey), in the Ramapo Mountains between Ringwood in Passaic County, New Jersey and Oakland in Bergen County, New Jersey
- Skyline Drive, part of Texas Park Road 3, in Davis Mountains State Park
- "Skyline Drive" (song), a song by the Cherry Poppin' Daddies from the 1994 album Rapid City Muscle Car

== See also ==
- Mount Equinox Skyline Drive, Manchester, Vermont
- Skyline Boulevard, follows the ridge of the Santa Cruz Mountains on the San Francisco Peninsula in California
- Skyline Parkway, a scenic byway in Duluth, Minnesota
