= Edna Henry Lee Turpin =

American writer

Edna Henry Lee Turpin (1867–1952) was an American author. She was born on July 26, 1867, at Echo Hill, Mecklenburg County, Virginia. She was the daughter of Edward Henry Turpin and Petronella Lee Turpin, but her father died of tuberculosis four months before she was born. Two siblings, Mary Wilson Turpin and Edward Henry Turpin both died in infancy before Edna was born. She spent her childhood on the family farm with her mother and her older brother, Henderson Lee Turpin (1861–1957). She began writing at an early age and, during her fifteenth year, her first short story was accepted for publication.

She later graduated from Hollins College. Over her lifetime he was a member of numerous professional organizations and societies. She was a Presbyterian. She never married but rather devoted her life to literary pursuits. She lived and worked for many years at Mountain Lake Biological Station writing and contributing to the scientific and artist community there. She died on June 8, 1952, and was buried in Hollywood Cemetery in Richmond, Virginia.

In addition to her own writing, she also edited and selected a number of collections which included, amongst others, a collection of Grimm's Fairy Tales for primary reader grades in the English language and "The Gold-Bug and Other Selections from the Works of Edgar Allan Poe."

== Bibliography ==
According to WorldCat, her book-length publications are

- Agriculture, Its Fundamental Principles. By Andrew M[acNairn] Soule . . . and Edna Henry Lee Turpin. Richmond, Atlanta [etc.]: B. F. Johnson Publishing Company, [c1907]. 320 p. color frontispiece, illustrations, 3 color plates 19 cm. Copies at ViHi and ViU
- Abram's Freedom. By Edna Turpin. Boston, New York, Chicago: The Pilgrim Press, [c1913]. 32 p. plate. 19 cm. Ornamental borders. "Reprinted from the Atlantic monthly." "The Plimpton Press, Norwood Mass. U.S.A." Issued in hard and soft covers. Copies at Vi, ViHi, ViLRMWC, ViRU, ViRVCU, and ViU. [WHB]
- Cotton. New York, Cincinnati [etc.]: American Book Company, [c1924]. vi, 266 p. frontispiece, illustrated, plates. 19 cm. Copies at ViLRMWC and ViU
- The Deserted Village, The Traveler, and Other Poems. By Oliver Goldsmith. Ed. by Edna Turpin. New York: C. E. Merrill Co., [c1907]. 153 p. frontispiece (portrait) 17 cm. Merrill's English texts. Copy at ViU.
- Echo Hill. By Edna Turpin. Illustrated by George Richards. New York: The Macmillan Co., 1933. ix, [1], 230 p. including frontispiece, illustrated 20 cm. Copy at ViLRMWC
- Essays. By Ralph Waldo Emerson. Ed. by Edna Henry Lee Turpin. New York: C. E. Merrill Co. [c1907]. 336 p. frontispiece (portrait) 17 cm. Merrill's English texts. Copy at ViU.
- Fables Every Child Should Know. Richmond: B. F. Johnson Pub. Co., [1920]. 96 p. illustrated 19 cm. Graded classics series. Copy at ViU.
- The Gold Bug. By Edgar Allan Poe; with introduction, critical opinions, and notes by Edna H. Turpin. New York: Maynard, Merrill, & Co., 1898. 64 p. portraits 17 cm. Maynard's English classic series, no. 204. Copy at ViU.
- Happy Acres, Anne Lewis and the Village Full of Cousins. Illustrated by Mary Lane McMillan. New York: The Macmillan Co., 1913. t.p. 1927. 363 p., [1] leaf of plates, illustrated. Copy at ViBlVPI
- Happy Acres. New York: The Macmillan company, 1922. 3 p.l., 363 p. frontispiece, illustrated 20 cm. Copy at ViU
- Honey-Sweet. By Edna Turpin; illustrated by Alice Beard. New York: Macmillan, 1911. 316 p. frontispiece, 20 cm. Copy at Vi
- The Lee Readers. New York, Cincinnati [etc.]: American Book Company, 1902. 5 v. color frontispiece (v. 3–5) illustrated (partly color) 19 cm. Copy at ViU
- Lilly Jane's Wash-Pot. [Richmond: Virginia Stationery Co.], 1917. 2 p. l., 9-18 p. plate. Copies at ViHi and ViRU
- Littling of Gaywood. By Edna Turpin. Drawings by Fritz Eichenberg. New York: Random House, [c1939]. 5 p. l., 3-265 p. illustrated 20 cm. Illustrated t.-p. and lining-papers. Copies at ViLRMWC and ViRVCU.
- Littling of Gaywood. By Edna Turpin. Drawings by Fritz Eichenberg. Richmond: Dietz Press Inc., 1945. 5 p. l., 3-265 p. illustrated 20 cm. Copies at ViHi and ViU [WHB]
- Lost and Found. Story by Edna Turpin and Catherine T[urner] Bryce; pictures by K. Alexander. New York: Nelson & Sons, 1939. 128 p. illustrated (part color) 21 cm. Copy at Vi
- Lost Covers. Edna Turpin. Illustrated by Victor Perard. New York: Random House, [c1937]. 281, [1] p. illustrated. 20 cm. Copies at Vi, ViHi and ViU [WHB]
- The New South, and Other Addresses. By Henry Woodfin Grady. With biography, critical opinions, and explanatory notes, by Edna Henry Lee Turpin. New York: Haskell House, 1969. 136 p. 23 cm. Copy at Vi
- Newson Readers. By Catherine Turner Bryce, Rose Lees Hardy, and Edna Henry Lee Turpin. New York and Chicago: Newson & Company, 1927. v. illustrated (part color) 20 cm. Copy at ViU
- The Old Mine's Secret. By Edna Turpin. Frontispiece by George Wright. New York: Macmillan, 1921. 3 p. l., 288 p. color frontispiece 20 cm. Copy at Vi
- The Old Mine's Secret; Anne Lewis and Her Village Cousins in War-Time. Frontispiece by George Wright. New York: Macmillan Co., 1938. 288 p. 20 cm. Copies at ViLRMWC and ViU
- Peggy of Roundabout Lane. By Edna Turpin. Illustrated by Alice Beard. New York: The Macmillan Co., 1917. 4 p. l., 310 p. frontispiece, plates. 20 cm. Copy at Vi
- Reed's Primary Speller. By Alonzo Reed and Edna H. L. Turpin. New York and Chicago: Charles E. Merrill Co., [1912]. 128 p. color frontispiece, illustrated 18 cm. Copy at ViU
- A Short History of the American People. New York: The Macmillan Company, 1911. xviii p., 1 leaf, 478 p. illustrated, maps. 20 cm. Copies at Vi and ViU
- A Short History of the American People. With an introduction by S. C. Mitchell. Atlanta, Richmond: B. F. Johnson Pub. Co., [1914]. xviii, 418, lxxxi p. illustrated, maps 20 cm. Copies at Vi and ViU
- Sir Roger de Coverley Papers in the Spectator / by Addison, Steele, and Budgell. With notes by Edna H. L. Turpin; with examination questions prepared by Cornelia Beare. New York: Maynard Merrill & Co., c1906. 269 p. 2 portraits (incl. frontispiece); 17 cm. Maynard's English classic series. Special number. Copies at ViLRMWC and ViU.
- The Story of Virginia. Text by Edna Turpin. Illustrated by Luther Coleman Wells. New York: Random House, [1949]. [56] p. illustrated, color maps (on lining papers). 29 cm. Juvenile literature. Copies at Vi, ViHi, ViLRMWC and ViU. [WHB]
- This is Our Land; the Story of Water, Soil, and Other Natural Resources. By Edna Turpin and Alfred L[awrence] Wingo. Boston: Christopher Pub. House, [1954]. 71 p. 21 cm. Copies at Vi, ViRU and ViU
- Three Circus Days. By Edna Turpin; pictures by George and Doris Hauman. New York: The Macmillan Company, 1935. 96 p. incl. color frontispiece, color illustrated 19 cm. Copy at Vi
- Three Circus Days. New York: The Macmillan Company, 1948. 96 p. incl. color frontispiece, color illustrated 19 cm. Copy at ViU
- Treasure Mountain. By Edna Turpin . . . illustrated by Robert Amick. New York: The Century Co., 1920. 4 p. l., 3-314 p. frontispiece, plates. 20 cm. Copy at Vi
- Treasure Mountain. By Edna Turpin . . . illustrated by Robert Amick. New York: The Century Co., 1921. 4 p. l., 3-314 p. frontispiece, plates. 20 cm. Copy at ViHi
- Treasure Mountain. By Edna Turpin. Illustrated by Robert Amick. New York: Appleton-Century, 1935 [c1920]. 4 p. l., 3-314 p. frontispiece, plates. 20 cm. Copy at ViBlVPI
- Wayside Flowers, Poems of the Out-of-Doors. By William Wordsworth, selected and introduced by Edna Turpin, illustrated by Helene Carter. New York: The Macmillan Company, 1931. viii, 76, [1] p. incl. frontispiece, illustrated 23 cm. Copies at ViRU, ViRVCU, and ViU
- Whistling Jimps. By Edna Turpin. Illustrated by D. G. Summers. New York: The Century Co., 1922. 5 p. l., 3-328 p. frontispiece, plates. 19 cm. Copies at ViLRMWC and ViU
- Zickle's Luck. By Edna Turpin, illustrated by Marjorie Peters. New York: Macmillan Company, 1938. 6 p. l., 91 p. illustrated 20 cm. Illustrated lining-papers. Copy at ViLRMWC.
- Zickle's Luck. New York: The Macmillan Company, 1946. 6 p. l., 91 p. illustrated 20 cm. Copy at ViU
- Zickle's Puppy Dog. By Edna Turpin, illustrated by Arne Lundborg. New York: Greystone Press [c1942]. 125 p. illustrated 20 cm. Copy at Vi
