= Cañon City Post Office and Federal Building =

- U.S. Post Office and Federal Building–Cañon City Main
- U.S. National Register of Historic Places
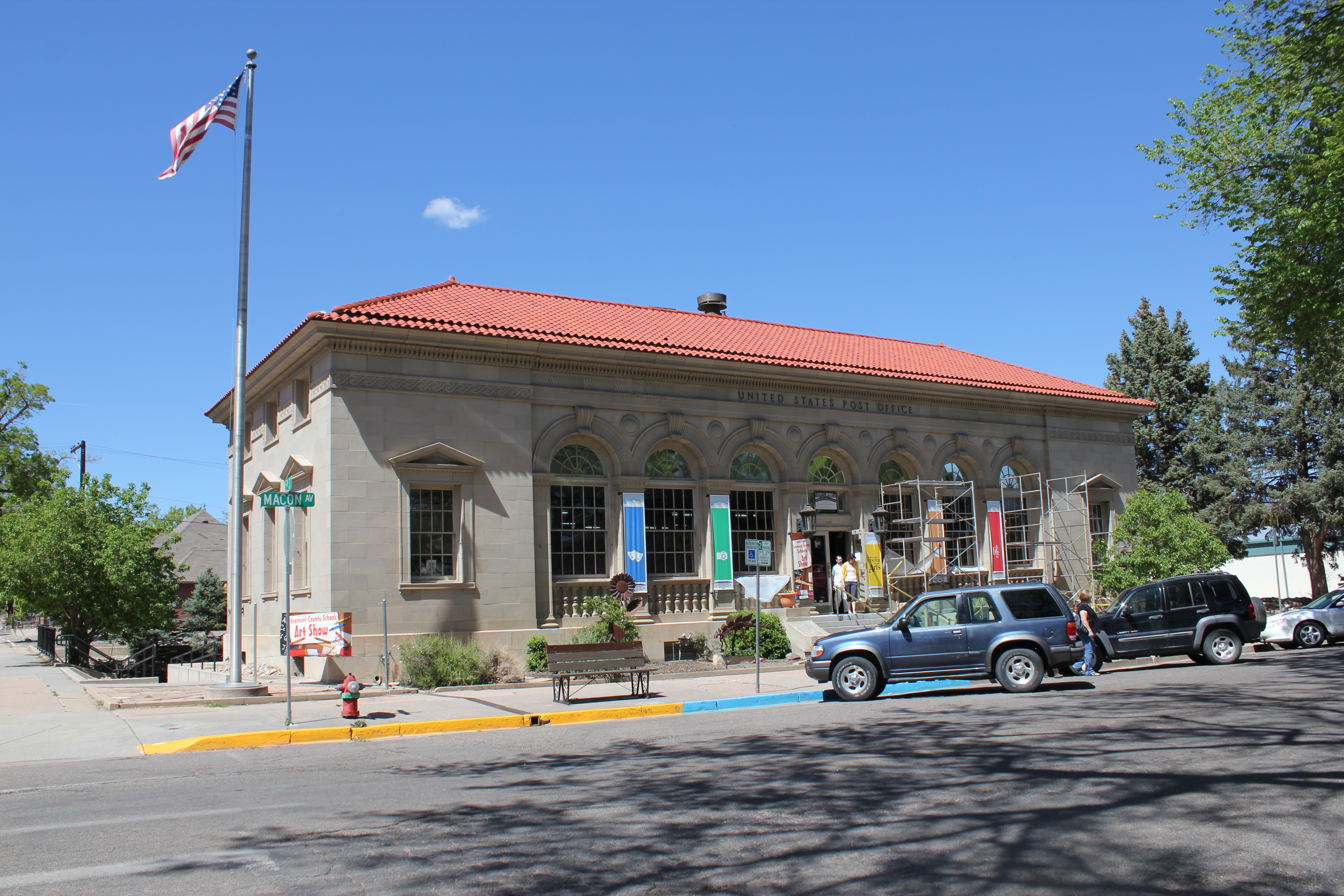

- Location within Colorado Location within the United States
- Location: Fifth St. and Macon Ave., Cañon City, Colorado
- Coordinates: 38°26′29″N 105°14′27″W
- Area: 0.5 acres (0.20 ha)
- Built: 1931
- Architect: Office of the Supervising Architect under James A. Wetmore
- Architectural style: Renaissance, Italian Renaissance Revival
- MPS: US Post Offices in Colorado, 1900–1941, TR
- NRHP reference No.: 86000167
- Added to NRHP: January 22, 1986

The Cañon City Post Office and Federal Building in Cañon City, Colorado, was built in 1931. It was listed on the National Register of Historic Places in 1986 as U.S. Post Office and Federal Building–Cañon City Main. It has also been known as the Cañon City Main Post Office.

Architecturally, it is a rigidly symmetrical building that is "an extremely late example of Italian Renaissance Revival" style. Its front facade features seven arches, one over the front entrance and the others over windows.
