= Museum of Colorado Prisons =

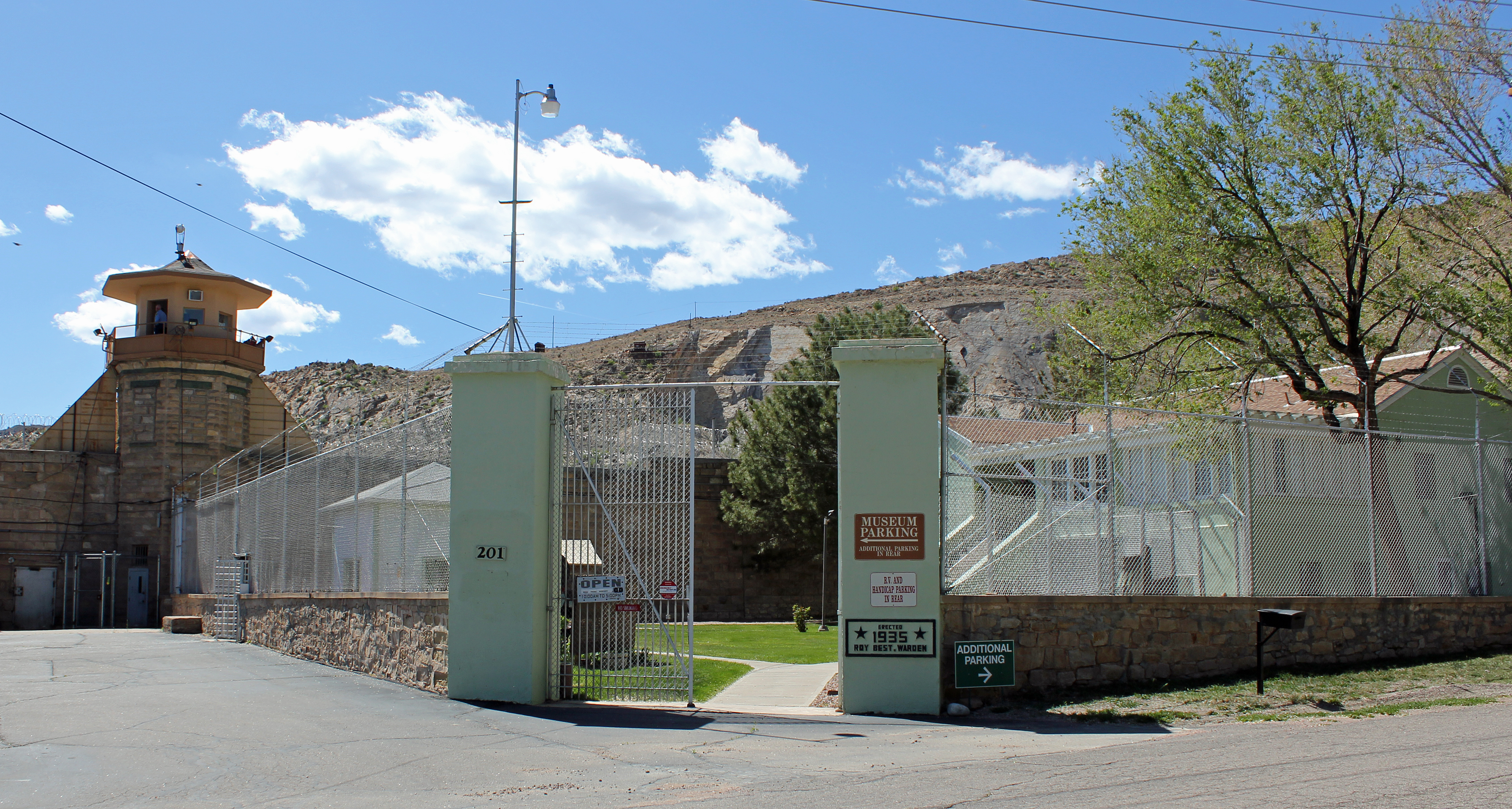
- Established: 1988
- Location: 201 N. 1st Street; Cañon City, Colorado
- Coordinates: 38.4394°N 105.2473°W
- Type: Prison museum
- Website: prisonmuseum.org

The Museum of Colorado Prisons is a non-profit museum located off U.S. Highway 50 in Cañon City, Colorado. It is housed in a former state women's prison and is directly east of the Colorado Territorial Correctional Facility (Old Max).

== History ==
The Museum of Colorado Prisons started operation on June 18, 1988.

The idea for a museum was conceived by a group of Fremont County residents. The project began in the early 1980s, with volunteers who sought to obtain permission to use the former Women's Prison building, which dated back to 1935. The building is adjacent to the east wall of the Colorado Territorial Correctional Facility, an active prison since 1871. The Colorado State Legislature approved the request on April 24, 1986. Canon City in turn granted a 99-year lease to the Foundation to operate a museum in the cell house.

A board of directors was formed on October 15, 1986. The board set about to raise funds for the museum. The costs included stabilizing the building, upgrading the heating and lighting systems, and adding features that would be accessible for disabled visitors. The museum was able to raise money through grants, lottery proceeds, donations and loans.

The cell house was renovated in June 1988. Its opening coincided with the summer tourist season. The cells were restored with a view to preserving the original feel of the cell house from its days as of housing inmates. Artifacts of the Colorado Prison System from 1871 to the present day were collected and catalogued by volunteers.

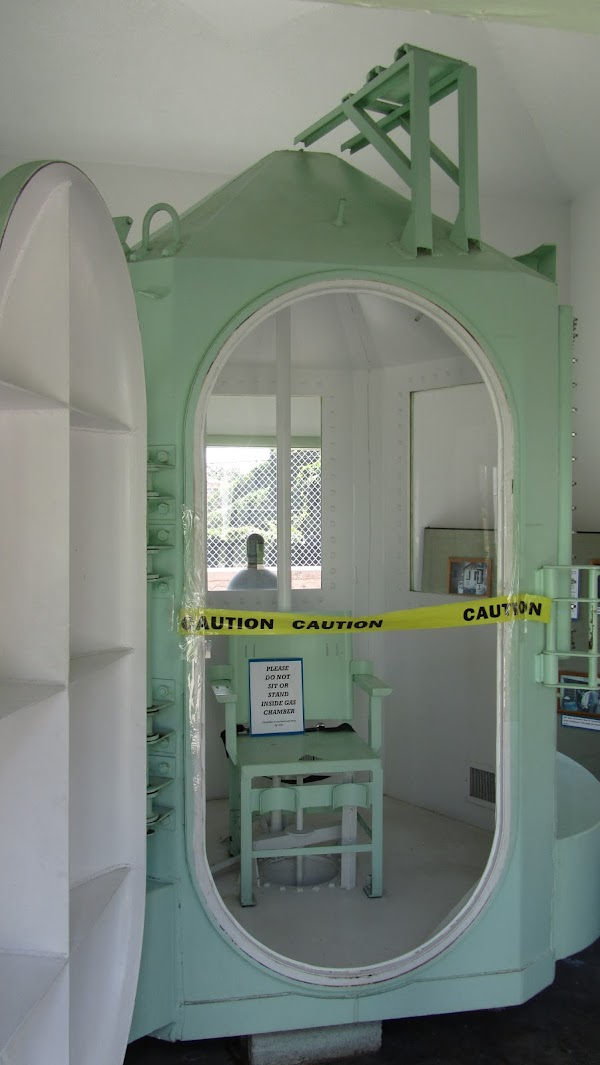
Gas Chamber Exhibit in 2010

== Mission ==
The Museum was established with a view to collect, preserve, conserve, exhibit, and interpret the historical heritage of the Colorado Prison System. The Museum was also opened to serve as an incentive for historical research, education, and scholarly writings on the subject. It was equally meant to be a means to deter criminal activity.
