= Royal Gorge Route Railroad =

Heritage railroad based in Cañon City, Colorado

Coordinates: 38.43798°N 105.24056°W

Cañon City & Royal Gorge Railroad, LLC
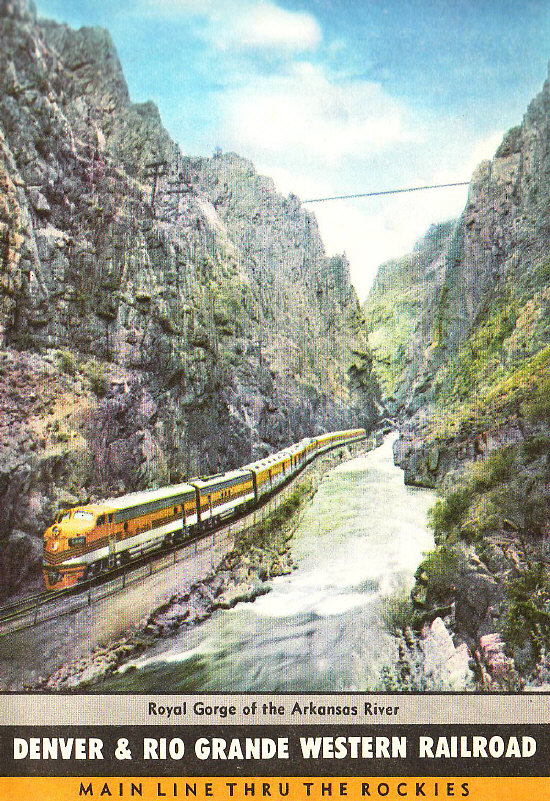
- D&RGW Train No. 1

Overview
- Headquarters: Cañon City, Colorado
- Reporting mark: CRRX
- Locale: Cañon City, Colorado
- Dates of operation: 1998–present
- Predecessor: Denver and Rio Grande Western Railroad

Technical
- Track gauge: 4 ft 8 1/2 in (1,435 mm) standard gauge
- Length: 24-mile (39 km)

Other
- Website: royalgorgeroute.com

The Cañon City & Royal Gorge Railroad, LLC (DBA "Royal Gorge Route Railroad") is a heritage railroad based in Cañon City, Colorado. A 1950s-era domeliner train makes daily 2-hour excursion runs from the Cañon City Santa Fe Depot through the Royal Gorge along a famous section of the former Denver and Rio Grande Western Railroad Tennessee Pass Subdivision main line.

== History ==
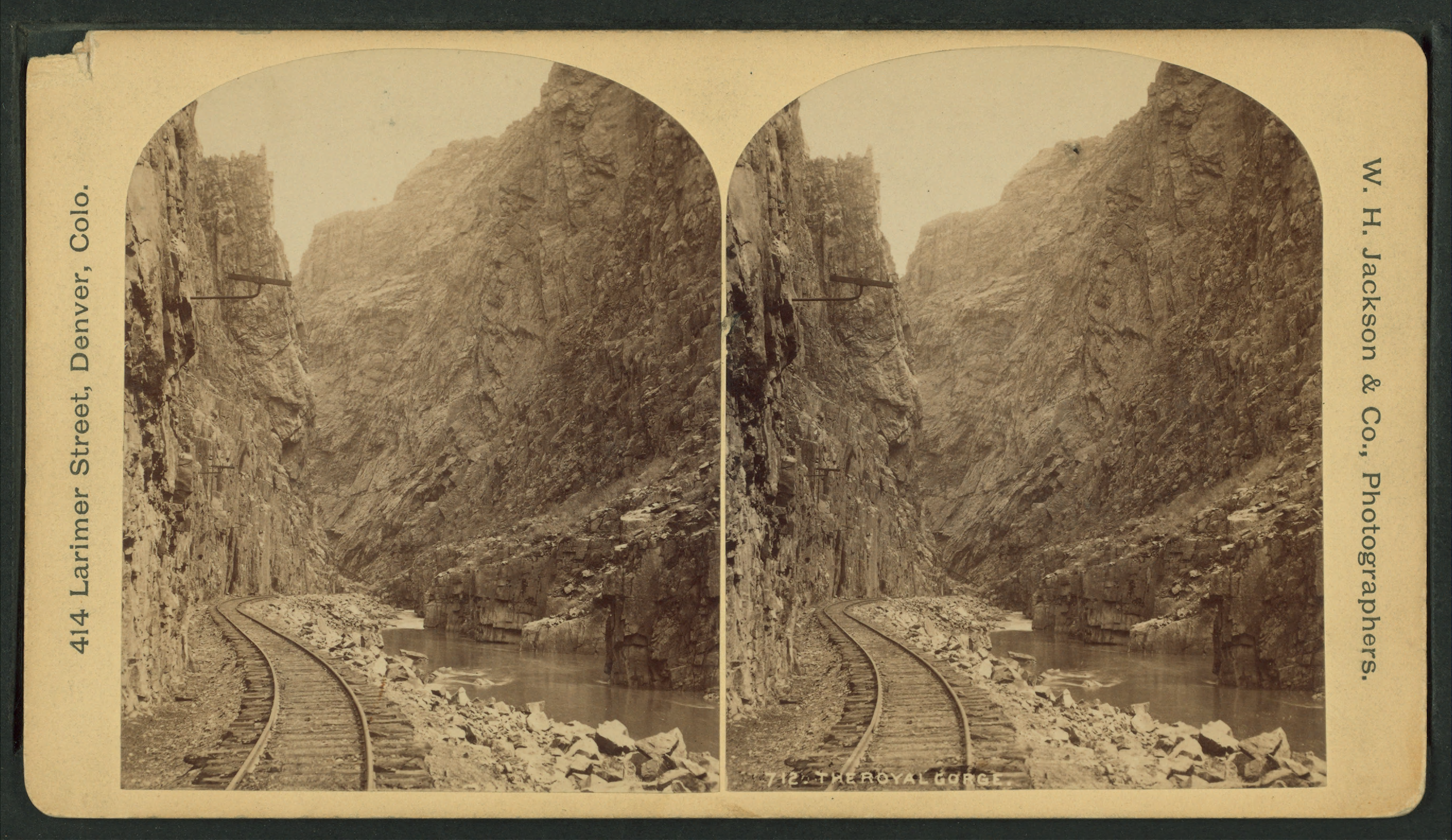
The Royal Gorge, by W. H. Jackson & Co. 2

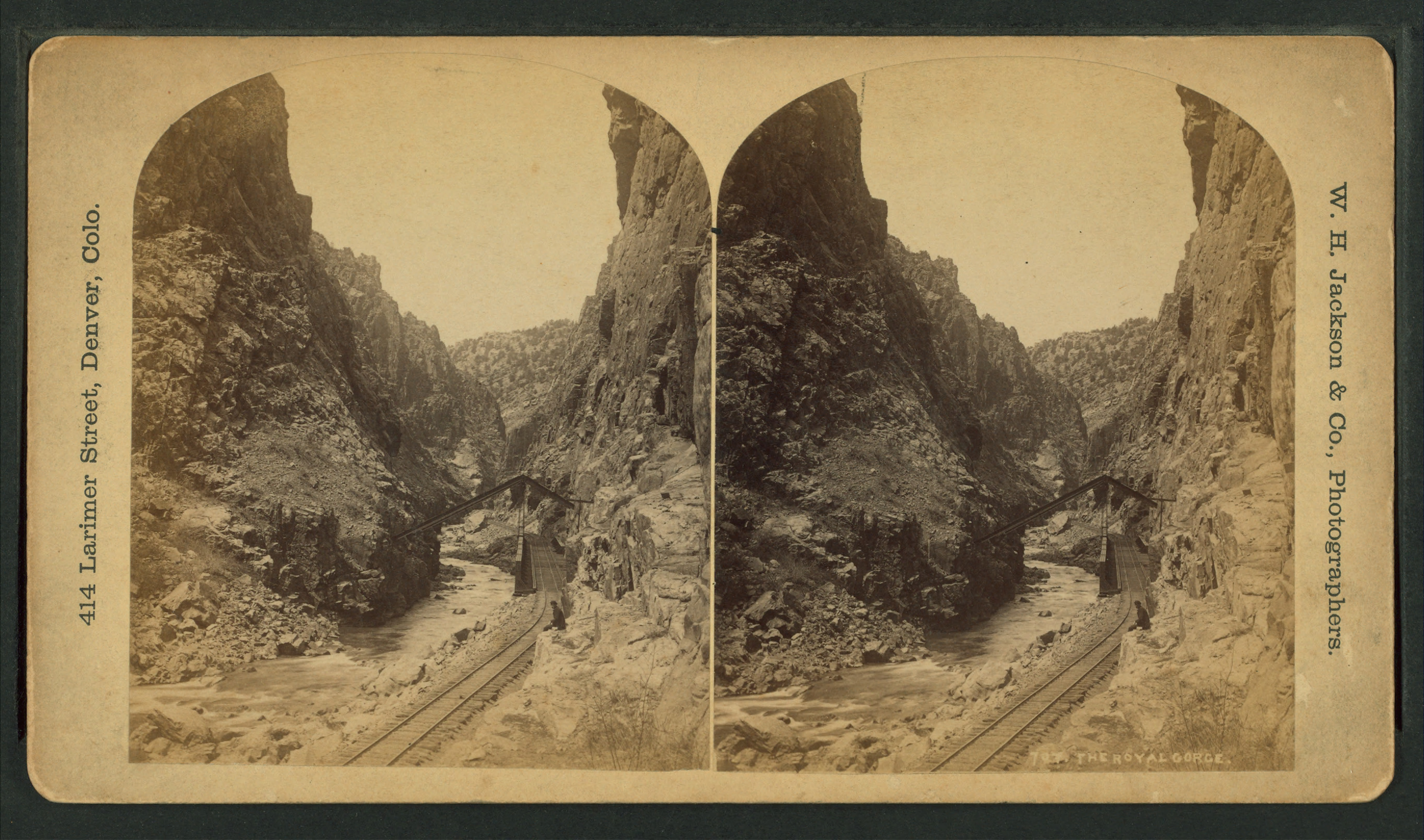
The Royal Gorge, from Robert N. Dennis collection of stereoscopic views 2

In the late 1870s, miners descended on the upper Arkansas River valley of Colorado in search of carbonate ores rich in lead and silver. The feverish mining activity in what would become the Leadville district attracted the attention of the Rio Grande and Santa Fe railroads, each of which already had tracks in the lower Arkansas valley: Santa Fe in Pueblo and the D&RG near Cañon City, some 35 miles (56 km) west. Extending either of these lines to Leadville would require laying more than 100 miles (160 km) of track through the "Grand Canyon of the Arkansas," a mountain valley 50 miles (80 km) in length at a consistent and railroad-friendly water grade of one percent.

For two railroads to occupy a river valley is not a problem in principle, but west of Cañon City the Arkansas River cuts through the Royal Gorge, a high plateau of igneous rocks forming a spectacular steep-walled gorge over 1,000 feet (300 m) deep and 6 miles (9.7 km) long. At its narrowest point, sheer walls on both sides plunge into the river, creating a nearly impassable barrier. So on this route, two railroads could not share the valley.

On April 19, 1878, a construction crew from the Santa Fe's proxy Cañon City and San Juan Railroad, (Note: The CC&SJ had been formed by the Santa Fe in February 1877 and a board of directors selected from local businessmen to give the Santa Fe, which was not incorporated in the state of Colorado, standing in the Colorado courts. The directors then appointed the operating officers of the Santa Fe as its own operating officers. This legal fiction was common practice and was undertaken to allow the Santa Fe to stake a plat of the first 20 miles (32 km) of the canyon and file it with the United States General Land Office of the Department of the Interior to comply with the provisions of the Right-of-Way Act of 1875, something the Rio Grande was tardy in doing for its 1871 and 1873 surveys of the gorge.) hastily assembled from sympathetic local citizens, began grading for a railroad line just west of Cañon City in the mouth of the gorge. The Rio Grande, whose track ended 0.75 miles (1.21 km) from downtown Cañon City, (Note: This was the contractual terminus resulting from a $100,000 bond issue approved by Cañon City voters. The D&RG's refusal to complete a line to downtown Cañon City after coercing the bonds from the town was the source of widespread citizen resentment of the Rio Grande.) raced crews to the same area, but they were blocked by Santa Fe graders in the narrow canyon. By a few hours they had lost the first round in what became a two-year struggle between the two railroads that would be known as the Royal Gorge War. Temporary injunctions forbidding further construction were filed in the Colorado courts and soon moved to the federal courts, each company claiming the right to use the gorge.

=== Royal Gorge War ===
On August 23, 1878, the United States Circuit Court for the District of Colorado found in favor of the Santa Fe and its proxy, the Cañon City and San Juan Company, allowing construction of a railroad through the first 20 miles (32 km) of the 50-mile (80 km) canyon, which includes the Royal Gorge. The Rio Grande was given the right to lay track that did not interfere with Santa Fe interests, and the right to use Santa Fe tracks where the gorge was too narrow to construct its own line.

The Rio Grande promptly appealed the decision to the United States Supreme Court and began work to finish a line in the upper 30 miles (48 km) of the canyon. The Santa Fe opposed this move by attempting to lay track in the upper canyon for its subsidiary Pueblo and Arkansas Valley Railroad. (Note: The P&AV was an earlier Santa Fe proxy, with track that ran from Dodge City, Kansas to Pueblo, Colorado. The Cañon City and San Juan consolidated with it in September 1878.) Santa Fe resorted to its larger corporate power and announced it would build standard-gauge tracks parallel to and in competition with existing narrow-gauge D&RG lines. The bondholders of the D&RG, fearing financial ruin from this threat, pressured Rio Grande management to lease the existing railroad to the Santa Fe.

An end to the struggle appeared to be at hand when the companies reached agreement on the proposed lease to all of the D&RG tracks, equipment, buildings and employees to AT&SF for a 30-year period. The Santa Fe thus gained access to Denver in competition with its transcontinental rivals, the Union Pacific and Kansas Pacific Railroads. The lease went into effect on December 13, 1878, and the Santa Fe soon increased freight rates south of Denver to favor shipping to southern Colorado over its lines to the east, to the detriment of Denver merchants using the leased D&RG lines. By March 1879, with allegations that all of its provisions were being violated by the Santa Fe, the Rio Grande sought to break the lease.

During this period, Santa Fe moved to finish construction of the railroad through the gorge itself while the Rio Grande continued construction in areas in the canyon west of the gorge. Grading crews of both companies were harassed by rocks rolled down on them, tools thrown in the river and other acts of sabotage. Both sides began assembling armed groups of men again to seize and hold strategic points in the gorge in anticipation of a favorable judgment by the Supreme Court. Rio Grande crews built 17 stone "forts" (such as "Fort DeRemer" (Note: Named for construction engineer James Richard DeRemer, who had them built.) at Spike Buck near Texas Creek, Colorado) to block the encroachments and keep the CC&SJ crews bottled up in the gorge.

After months of shrinking earnings from their leased railroad, Rio Grande management went to court to break the lease. While lawyers argued their case before the court, armed men hired by Santa Fe took control of Rio Grande stations from Denver to Cañon City, led by Bat Masterson, the sheriff of Ford County, Kansas, at the time, ostensibly hired to assemble a "posse" to defend their interests. Masterson enlisted the help of Doc Holliday to assemble 33 recruits, including the notorious gunfighters “Dirty” Dave Rudabaugh, Josh Webb, Ben Thompson, and “Mysterious” Dave Mather. On April 21, 1879, the Supreme Court granted the D&RG the primary right to build through the gorge on the basis that the lower courts had erred in not recognizing that it had been granted prior right to use of the entire 50 miles in 1872 by an Act of Congress. Masterson's posse returned to Kansas but the validity of the lease remained unsettled.

In early June 1879, when it appeared the issue was about to be resolved in favor of the Rio Grande, Masterson and 60 men hurriedly returned by special train, taking up a key position at the defensible Santa Fe roundhouse in Pueblo. An injunction on June 10, 1879, from a local court restraining the Santa Fe from operating on Rio Grande track sparked an armed retaking of their railroad the next day by Rio Grande crews. Robert F. Weitbrec, former construction foreman and now treasurer of the company, and chief engineer John A. McMurtrie brought 100 men to Pueblo. They met with Pueblo County Sheriff Henly R. Price and Town Marshal Pat Desmond on the best means to serve the writ and dispossess Masterson's men of the roundhouse. Weitbrec suggested they "borrow" a cannon from the state armory only to find that Masterson had already taken it and reportedly trained it from the roundhouse down the street approach. McMurtrie and Desmond gathered 50 Rio Grande men in front of the Victoria Hotel and distributed rifles and ammunition. They marched to the railroad platform, broke down the door to the telegraph office, and when shots were fired, Masterson's men fled through the back windows, cutting him off from any communication with his employers. (Note: However an 1898 popular history of the building of the railroads in the west, The Story of the Railroad by Cy Warman, asserts that Masterson surrendered the roundhouse peacefully before the telegraph office was seized. (Warman, p. 154)) Supposedly when confronted with the re-borrowed cannon, Masterson's men surrendered the roundhouse. (Note: Rumors among disappointed Santa Fe partisans in Dodge City accused Masterson of accepting a bribe to surrender. However, Weitbrec met with Masterson after taking control of the telegraph and it is likely that, unable to communicate with the AT&SF, service of the writ and seizure of all the Rio Grande property elsewhere actually led him to capitulate. (DeArment, p. 152))

Despite accounts in partisan secondary sources reporting deaths at the hands of the rival company's men, there is no reliable proof that anyone was actually killed. (Note: Two stories illustrate the nature of the "war". The Dodge City (Kansas) Times alleged that a Harris W Jenkins was shot in the back and paralyzed by a "drunken Rio Grande guard" while fleeing through a window of the telegraph office in Pueblo, later dying at his "home in Pawnee County." The Colorado Weekly Chieftain was forced to make a retraction when it reported that a "John" (or James) Gallagher was killed by a blow to the head from a Santa Fe worker, only to have the alleged victim show up very much alive at their offices.) The federal courts forced the D&RG to return the property it had illegally seized and ordered it into receivership. However in the fall of 1879, railroad "robber baron" Jay Gould of the Kansas Pacific Railroad loaned the D&RG $400,000, bought a 50% interest in the company and announced the intention of completing a rail line from St. Louis to Pueblo to compete with the Santa Fe.

== After the Royal Gorge War ==
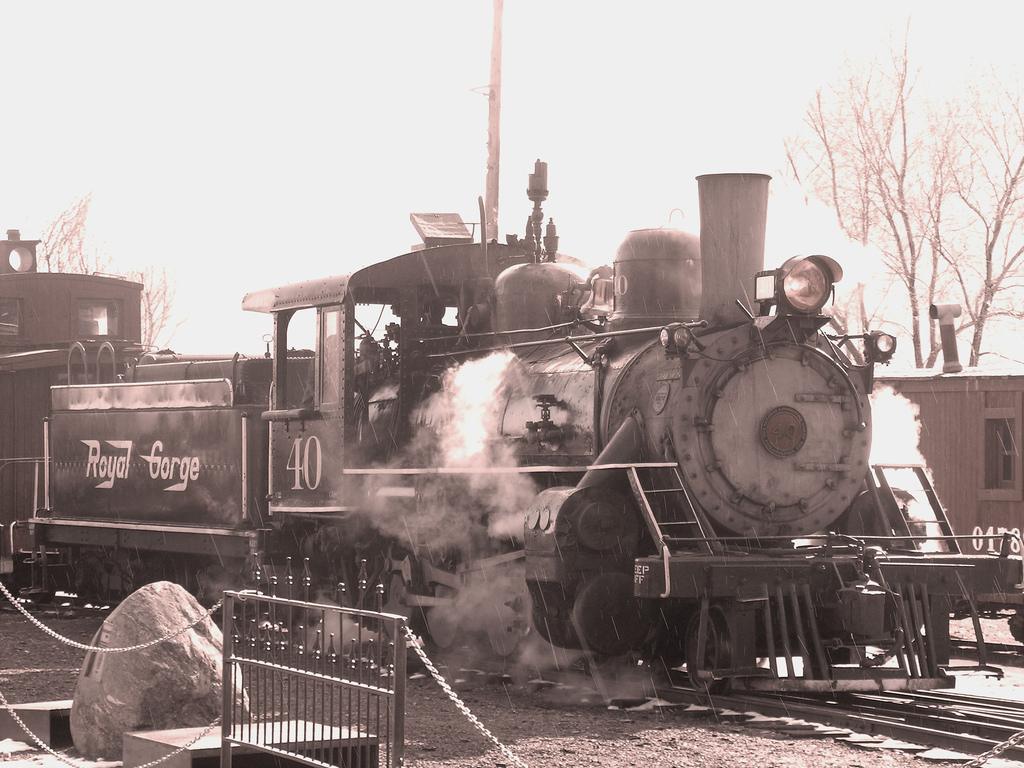
Royal Gorge 40

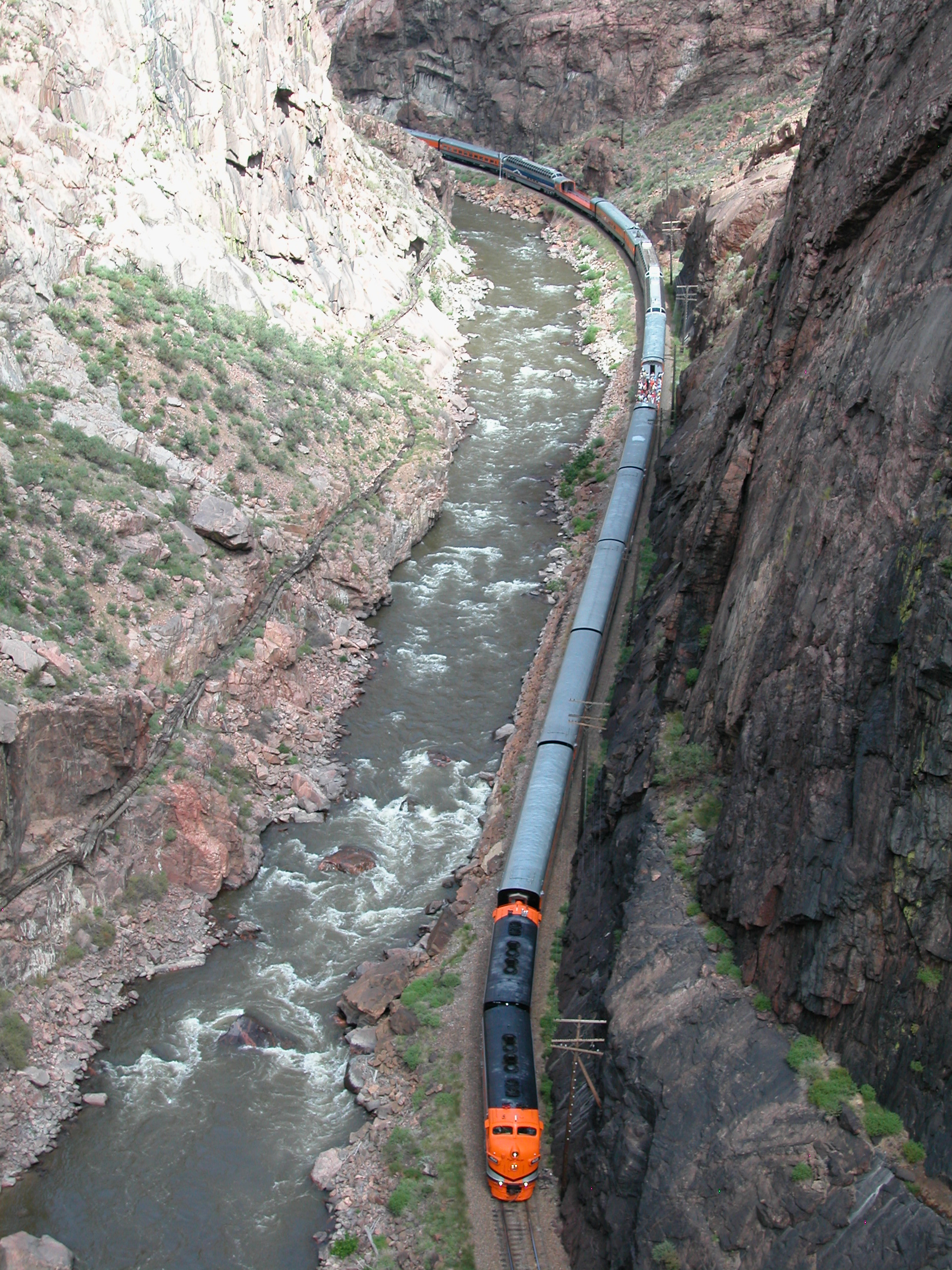
A view of the Royal Gorge Route Railroad

In the end, the warring companies settled out of court. On March 27, 1880, the two railroads signed what was called the "Treaty of Boston" (Boston being the corporate home of the Santa Fe) which ended all litigation and gave the D&RG back its railroad. The D&RG paid the Santa Fe $1.8 million (which included a $400,000 "bonus" over actual costs) for the railroad it had built in the gorge, the grading it had completed, materials on hand, and interest. Gould's plans for competitive lines and a proposed line through Raton Pass southward into New Mexico, were cancelled by the Rio Grande. D&RG construction resumed, and rails reached Leadville on July 20, 1880.

Passenger train service began in 1880 and continued through 1967. Rio Grande continued freight service through the gorge as part of their Tennessee Pass subdivision until 1989, when the company merged with the Southern Pacific Railroad, and the Southern Pacific took control of the gorge line. In 1996, the combined company was merged into the systems of the Union Pacific Railroad Company. The year after Union Pacific purchased Southern Pacific and Rio Grande, the railroad closed the Tennessee Pass line, including the gorge segment.

In 1997, Union Pacific was persuaded to sell the 12 miles (19 km) of track through the Royal Gorge in an effort to preserve this scenic route. Two new corporations, Cañon City & Royal Gorge Railroad, LLC (CC&RG) and Rock & Rail, Inc. (RRRR), joined together to form Royal Gorge Express, LLC (RGX), to purchase the line. Passenger service on the new Royal Gorge Route Railroad began in May 1999, and are controlled by RRRR. Train movements from Pueblo CO to Cañon City CO on the Tennessee Pass Subdivision are controlled by the Union Pacific Harriman Dispatch Center in Omaha, Nebraska.

=== Hanging Bridge ===
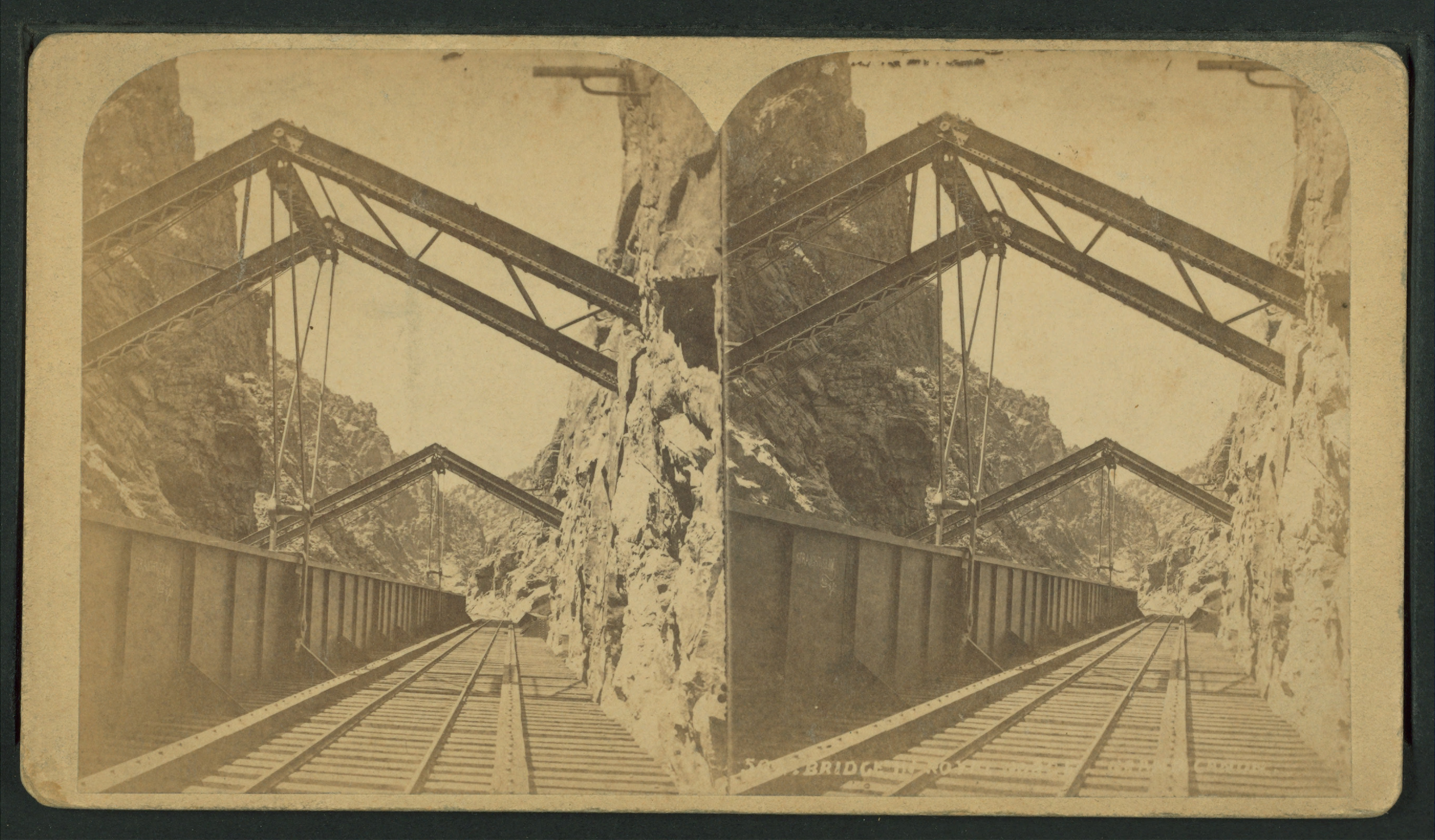
Hanging Bridge, CO. Late 19th century.

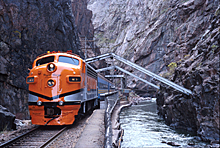
Hanging Bridge, 2009

A highlight of the gorge route is the 1879 hanging bridge located along the north side where the gorge narrows to 30 feet (9.1 m) and the sheer rocks walls plunge into the river. Designed by Kansas engineer C. Shallor Smith and built by Santa Fe construction engineer A.A. Robinson (Note: J. R. DeRemer is often given credit for the building of the Hanging Bridge but he was in the employ of the Rio Grande at the time the bridge was built by the Santa Fe.) for $11,759, the bridge consists of a 175-foot (53 m) plate girder suspended on one side under A-frame girders that span the river and are anchored to the rock walls. Strengthened over the years, the bridge remains in service today.

=== Royal Gorge Route Today ===
The Royal Gorge Route Railroad operates trains year-round through the Royal Gorge from Cañon City, Colorado to the western terminus in Parkdale, Colorado. The train is a destination attraction that carries passengers under the Royal Gorge suspension bridge. David Romano is the general manager.

== See also ==
- List of Colorado historic railroads
- List of heritage railroads in the United States
