= Cañon City Schools =

School district in Colorado, United States

Address
- 101 North 14th Street Cañon City, Colorado, 81212; United States
- Coordinates: 38°26′46″N 105°13′48″W

District information
- Type: Unified school district
- Motto: Learning for life!
- Grades: P–12
- Superintendent: Adam Hartman
- School board: 5 members
- Chair of the board: Robin Reeser
- Schools: 8
- Budget: $54,220,000
- NCES District ID: 0802790

Students and staff
- Students: 3,177
- Teachers: 218.96 (on an FTE basis)
- Staff: 499.36 (on an FTE basis)
- Student–teacher ratio: 14.51

Other information
- Website: www.canoncityschools.org

Cañon City Schools, also known as the Cañon City School District, is a school district in Cañon City, Colorado, United States.

== Schools ==
- Cañon Exploratory School, created from combining Madison Exploratory School and Skyline Elementary School
- Cañon City High School, built in 1961 allowing the former high school to become the junior high
- Cañon Online Academy
- Cañon City Middle School, housed in the historic 1929 Cañon City Senior High School
- ECHO - Early Childhood Services
- Harrison School, built to replace Harrison Elementary School and became a K-8 school
- Lincoln Science and Technology School, formerly Lincoln Elementary School
- McKinley Elementary School
- Washington Elementary School

=== Former schools ===
- Garden Park High School
- Lincoln Exploratory School, housed in Lincoln Elementary School
