= Tunnel Drive Trail =

Hiking trail in Colorado, United States

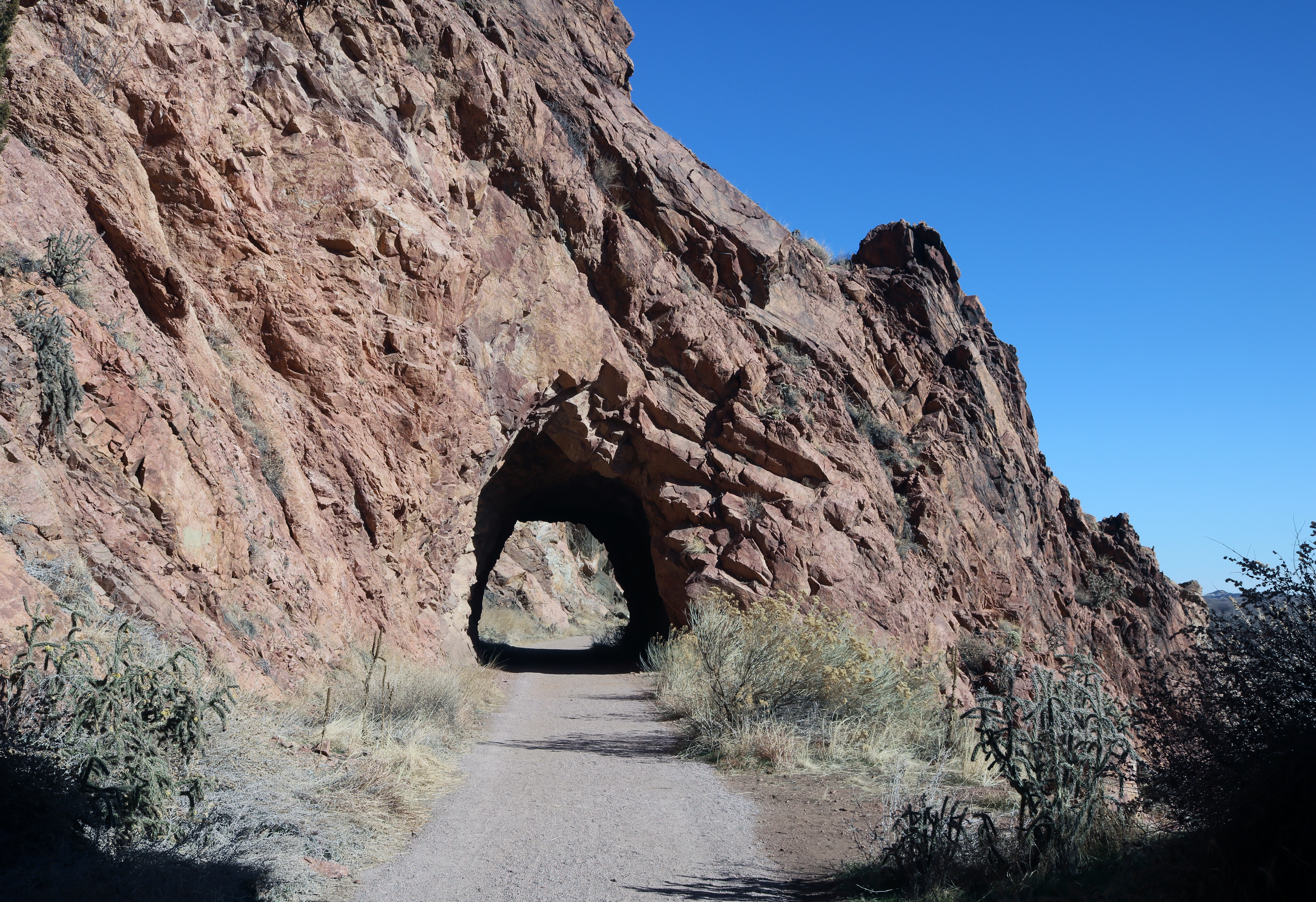
- One of the tunnels along the trail
- Length: 4 miles (6.4 kilometers)
- Location: Cañon City, Colorado
- Trailheads: 205 Tunnel Drive, Cañon City, Colorado, 81212
- Use: Hiking
- Highest point: 5,500 feet (1,700 meters)
- Lowest point: 5,400 feet (1,600 meters)
- Difficulty: Easy
- Sights: Arkansas River; Royal Gorge Route Railroad
- Surface: Concrete for the first 100 yards; the rest is gravel
- Right of way: The former route of an irrigation canal
- Website: www.canoncity.org/facilities/facility/details/tunneldrive-26

The Tunnel Drive Trail is an out-and-back hiking trail located in Cañon City, Colorado. The trail parallels and overlooks the Arkansas River and the Royal Gorge Route Railroad. Popular with locals, the trail starts just inside the Cañon City city limits and then, crossing out of the city, it goes on State of Colorado and BLM land.

== Original use ==
The trail was originally the site of a wooden irrigation canal that also supplied water to Cañon City. It was built in the late nineteenth-century and was called the redwood stave irrigation pipeline. The city stopped using the canal in 1974.

The canal passed through three tunnels cut out of the granite cliff on the north side of the trail. The trail now passes through the tunnels, one of which is quite long.
