= Cañon City Downtown Historic District =

Historic district in Colorado, United States

- U.S. National Register of Historic Places
- U.S. Historic district
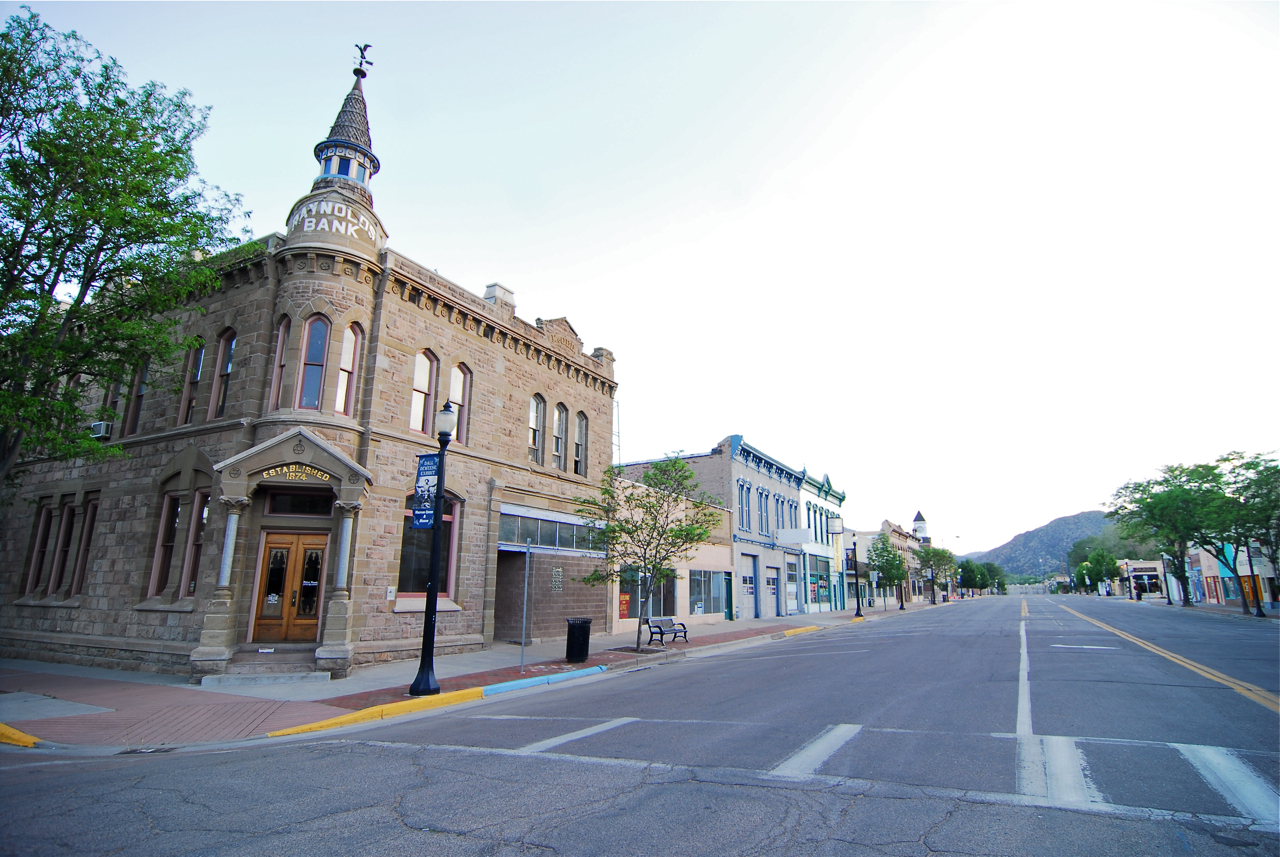
- Raynolds Bank (1883), on Main Street

- Location within Colorado Location within the United States
- Location: Roughly Main St. from 3rd to 9th Sts. and Macon Ave. (original), 602 Macon Ave. (increase) Cañon City, Colorado
- Coordinates: 38°26′29″N 105°14′17″W
- Built: 1870 (original) and 1900 (increase)
- Architect: multiple
- Architectural style: Classical Revival, Late Victorian
- NRHP reference No.: 83003517 and 86000201
- Added to NRHP: October 20, 1983 (original); February 6, 1986 (increase)

Cañon City Downtown Historic District is a historic district in Cañon City, Colorado. It was listed on the National Register of Historic Places in 1983. The historic district listing was based on a 1981 survey by city staff; a 2004-05 survey has been completed which updates and expands upon it.

The district includes 80 historic structures, mostly two-story buildings, in the downtown commercial area of Cañon City. These are mostly on Main Street from 4th Street to 7th Street. They were built mostly during 1870-1920 of brick and stone and reflect Cañon City's success as a regional trade center.

Thirty-three are identified as significant contributing buildings, and 15 as also contributing, with the remainder being intrusions. The northeast "anchor" of the district is the former United Methodist Church, now Christ First Community Church at 8th and Main. The McClure House/Strathmore Hotel (1872), separately listed on the NRHP, on Main and the west side of 4th Street is at the other end.

It includes the Cañon City Elks Club, built 1911, of the 1900-founded B.P.O.E. No. 610.

In 1986 its borders were increased to include 602 Macon Avenue, which is the former sanitarium building of Dr. Ward, and which has been turned into condominiums.

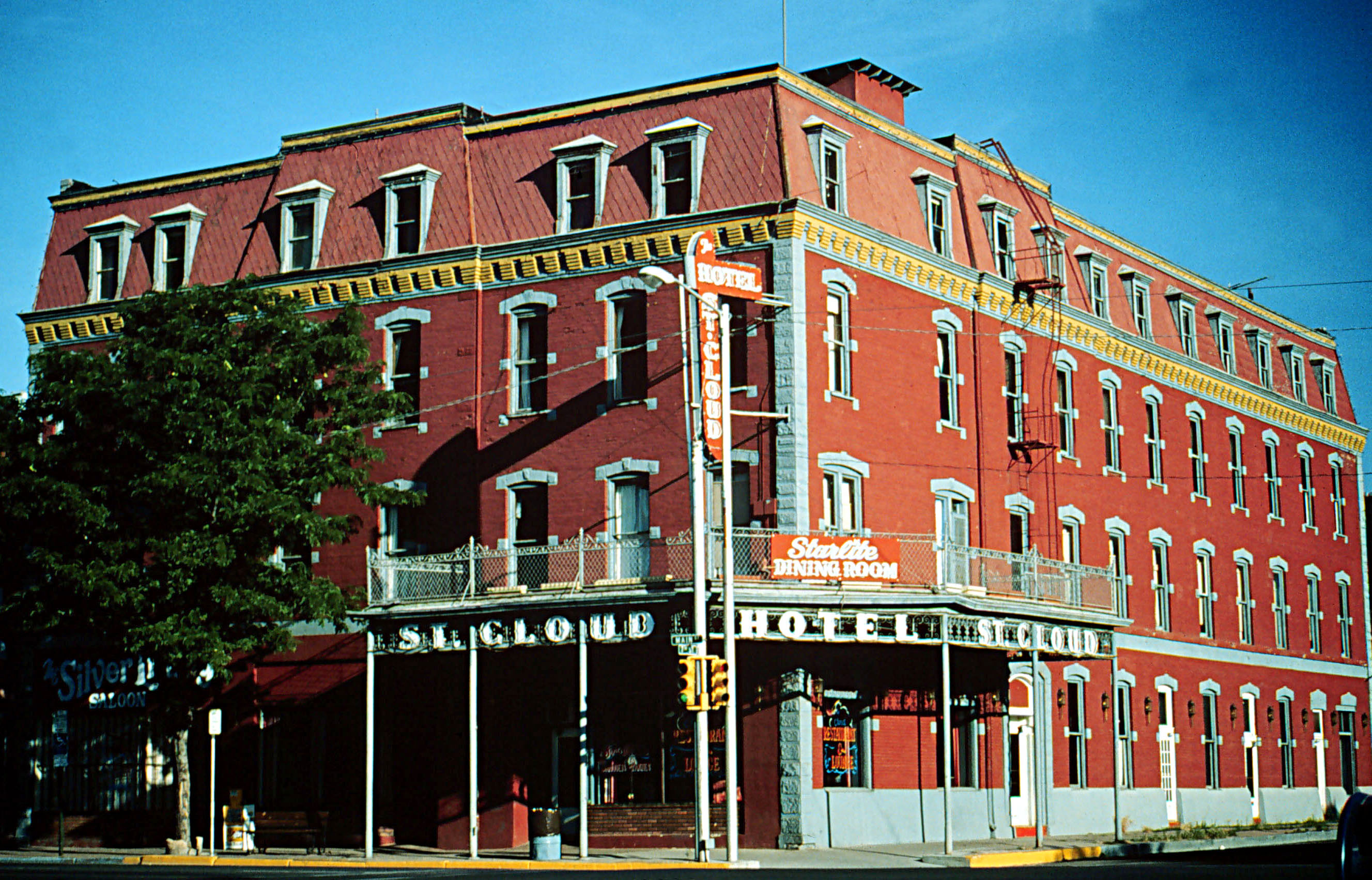
St. Cloud Hotel (1888), at 7th & Main

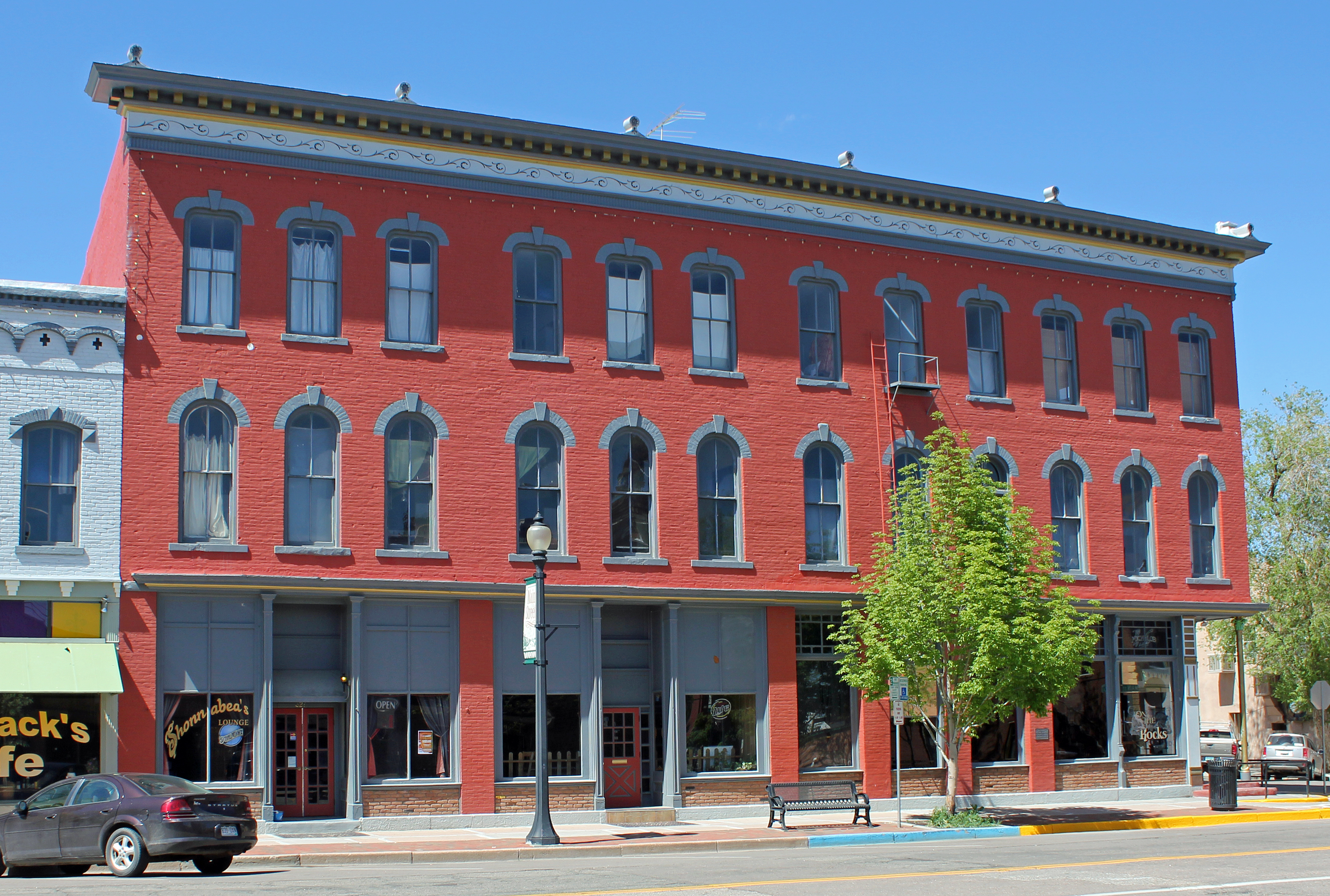
McClure House/Strathmore Hotel

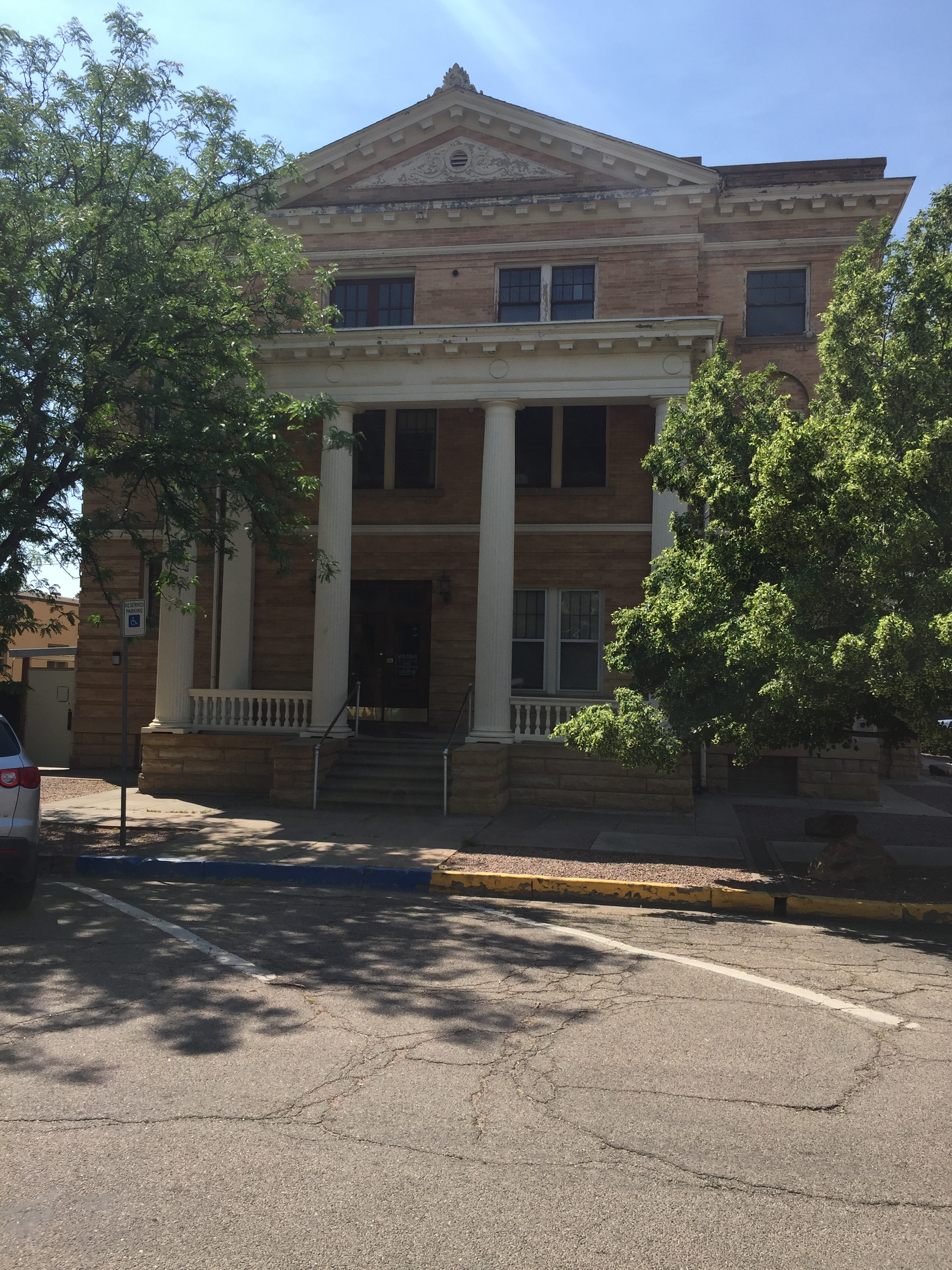
Elks Club

== See also ==
- National Register of Historic Places listings in Fremont County, Colorado
