= Rock & Rail =

Railroad in Colorado

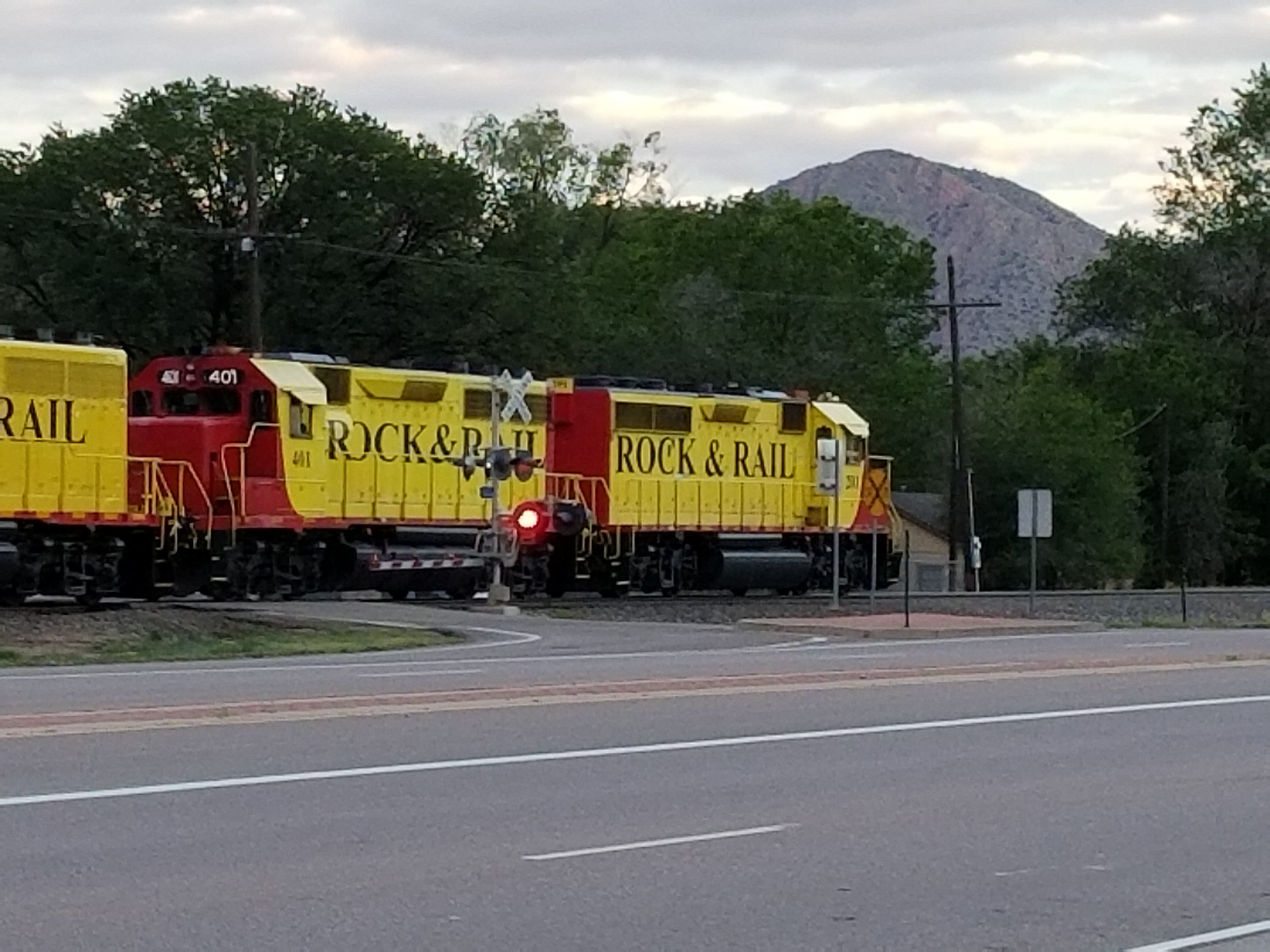
A trio of Rock & Rail RR EMD GP40s roll westward without any cars through Cañon City, Colorado.

Rock and Rail (reporting mark RRRR) is a short line railroad operating in southern Colorado that is currently a subsidiary of Martin Marietta Materials. The company began operations in July 1988.
