= Skyline Drive (Colorado) =

Scenic roadway in Cañon City, Colorado, United States

Route information
- Length: 3 mi (4.8 km)
- Existed: 1905–present
- Restrictions: One-way traffic

Major junctions
- North end: US 50 in Cañon City
- South end: 5th Street in Cañon City

Location
- Country: United States
- State: Colorado

Highway system
- Colorado State Highway System; Interstate; US; State; Scenic

Skyline Drive is a scenic roadway in Cañon City, Colorado. It was built by inmate labor in 1905. The road starts from U.S. Highway 50 and gradually inclines up the side of a ridge. When the road crests, it winds, climbs, and falls like a roller coaster until near its end, where a scenic outlook overlooks both the city to the east and the highway to the west.

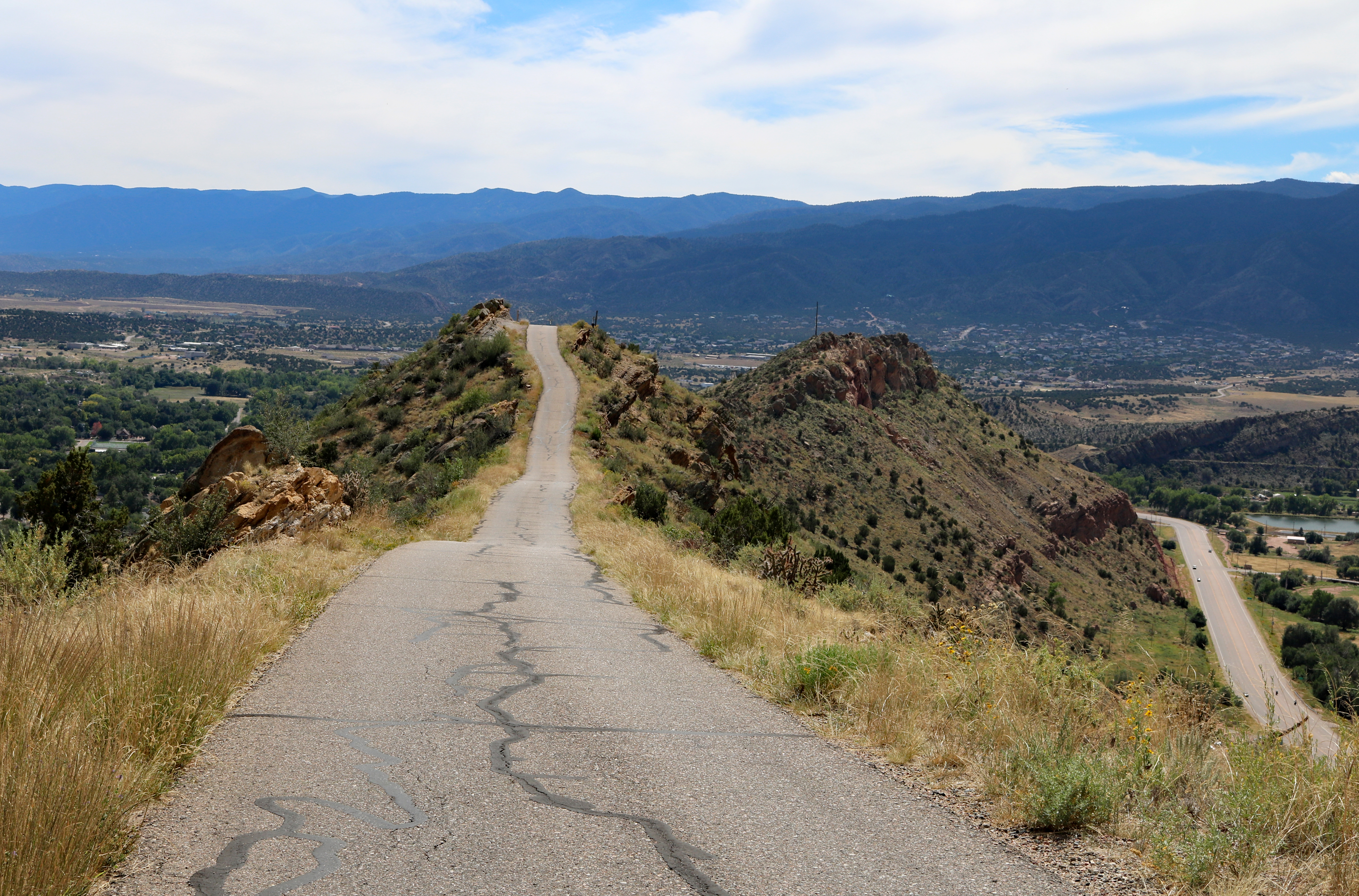
Skyline Drive, looking towards the south

The single-lane, one-way road rises about 800 feet (240 meters) above the surrounding terrain. There are no guardrails despite sharp drop-offs, and the drive is about 3 miles (4.8 kilometers) long.

The road ends in a residential neighborhood, and becomes a residential street that intersects with 5th Street, where signs point south toward US 50 and "Historic Downtown Cañon City," allowing drivers to head downtown and return to the highway.

== Geology ==
The drive sits on the top of Skyline Ridge, a hogback composed of upturned Dakota sandstone. Outcrops of the Morrison and the Fountain formations can also be seen. Along the drive is the "Dinosaur trackway," a fenced-off area along the road adjacent to some exposed strata, which showcases the fossilized footprints of ankylosaurs walking towards the west.
