= Robert Wesley Amick =

American painter

Robert Wesley Amick (1879–1969) was an American painter, illustrator and teacher who specialized in romantic paintings of the early western history of the United States. Amick studied at the Art Students' League of New York and the Yale School of Fine Art. He is best known for his American Old West art but painted equine, landscape and genre art of both eastern and western scenes during the Arts and Crafts era. He is perhaps best known for twelve paintings of the American West (including "Where the Sun Goes") that were widely reproduced in art prints for use in American schools. These and his portrait of the racehorse Man o' War are perhaps amongst his most memorable works.

== Early life ==
Amick was born in a log cabin on Currant Creek on 15 October 1879, in Canon City, Colorado: he was one of six children. His parents came from pioneer stock and Amick was surrounded by scenes of everyday cowboy life as he grew up. He showed an early interest in art, creating pen and ink drawings as a small boy.

== Education and early career ==
In 1900, Amick began to study law at the University of Pennsylvania but shortly after he transferred to Yale University at New Haven, Connecticut, where he graduated with a law degree in 1903. He worked for a short time in the art classes at Yale but was eventually discouraged from doing so by his law professors.

Amick began to practice law in Ohio. However, his ambition to work as an artist continued and he left his law practice to study art on a formal basis. He moved to New York City where he studied privately under George Bridgman and entered the Art Students' League, acquiring that technical expertise which is a marked characteristic of his canvases and graduating in 1909.

== Career as an artist ==
In his New York City studio at 63 Washington Square South he began his art career in 1909 as an illustrator for many of the popular magazines and periodicals of the day, including Scribner’s, The American, Redbook, Harper's Bazaar and Metropolitan.

He soon began to express himself on canvas with oils, with his abiding affection for the scenes of his childhood and the romance of America's early western history acting as the two greatest influences on his work. These became the dominant motive and mission of his life as an artist. His vivid colours, dynamic action and realistic portrayal of western scenes made his works extremely popular with calendar and lithographic companies during the 1920s and 1930s. His love of mountains, azure skies, sharply-etched light and shade and cowboys with their horses became his artistic trademarks.

- 1909-1930: Operated his own art studio at 63 Washington Square, New York City. In addition to illustrating, he also began painting in oils, mostly scenes of the American West. Lived here until 1926 when he took up residence with his family in Old Greenwich, Connecticut, commuting by train to his clients and studio in New York.
- 1913: Elected to membership of New York's Society of Illustrators.
- 1915-1930: Maintained a Summer Studio at Woodstock, New York doing oil paintings of the American East and West.
- 1916: Married Alice Rowe of Yarmouth, Nova Scotia, Canada. The couple made their home at 63 Washington Square, New York City. They had one daughter - Katherine.
- 1921-1929: The U.S. Printing and Lithograph Company reproduced twelve of Amick's western paintings as art prints for distribution to schools all over the United States and to retailers. These included "Enchanted Pool", "The Pioneers", "Phantom Canyon", "The Indian Weaver", "Pueblo Indian", "The Great Divide", and "Where The Sun Goes". His western paintings particularly were becoming highly respected among critics and the art-buying public.
- 1927: Founded the Art Society of Old Greenwich and served as its President for 17 years.
- 1928: Painted a mural for Canon City Municipal Building which he restored himself in 1954. The mural is still there in the Royal Gorge Museum & History Centre and is in good condition.
- 1930: Moved studio to his residence at Old Greenwich, Connecticut. Continued abundant production of oil paintings of the "Old West" which he never tired of creating as long as he lived. He also created many landscapes of New England.
- 1938: Exhibited at Douthitt Gallery, New York City.
- 1942: First exhibited "Man O' War", the painting of the famous racehorse. This exemplified his mastery of equine subjects and achieved its own fame.
- 1944-1962: Art instructor for Adult Education Department of Greenwich Public Schools
- 1945: One man exhibit at Allen Galleries, Houston, Texas.
- 1945-1965 Painted more than 100 portraits of well-known regional personalities.
- 1967: Mr. Roy C. Coffee, Texas art collector, buys his first Amick from a Taos, New Mexico gallery. Flies to Old Greenwich to meet Amick and purchases several more, beginning his Amick collection which is the largest extant aggregation of Amick's work today.
- 1969: Amick died in Old Greenwich, Connecticut in his 90th year. Buried in Canon City, Colorado.
- 1970: Traveling exhibition of Amick paintings sponsored by Mr Coffee opens at Municipal Museum in Canon City and circulates through Colorado, Arizona, New Mexico and Texas.
- 1993: First Annual "Robert Wesley Amick Founder's Show" sponsored by the Art Society of Old Greenwich held at Greenwich YWCA's Gertrude White Gallery.

In his later years, Amick resided in Old Greenwich, Connecticut and spent much of his time as a portrait painter and an instructor in art classes. He founded the Art Society of Greenwich in 1927.

Amick’s individual canvases may be found in most of the major private collections and museums of Western Art in the United States.

== Death ==
Amick died in 1969. He is buried at Greenwood Pioneer Cemetery, Canon City, Colorado, next to his parents.
