= Cañon City High School =

Location
- 1313 College Avenue; Cañon City, Colorado 81212; United States
- Coordinates: 38°27′2″N 105°14′0″W

Information
- School type: Public high school
- School district: Cañon City RE-1
- CEEB code: 060200
- NCES School ID: 080279000172
- Principal: Bill Summers
- Teaching staff: 57.23 (FTE)
- Grades: 9–12
- Enrollment: 954 (2023–2024)
- Student to teacher ratio: 16.67
- Colors: Black and Vegas gold
- Athletics conference: CHSAA
- Mascot: Tiger
- Website: cchs.canoncityschools.org

Cañon City High School (CCHS) is a high school in Cañon City, Colorado, United States. The current campus was built in 1961 with major additions in the 1980s and the late 2000s. The former school building now serves as Cañon City Middle School and was built in 1929.

== Athletics ==
CCHS currently competes in these sports (may be incomplete):

- Football
- Men's and women's basketball
- Baseball
- Tennis
- Men's and women's cross country
- Wrestling
- Golf
- Soccer
- Volleyball
- Cheerleading
- Dance Team (Tiger Ladies)

== Band ==
The school's band was the Colorado Bandmasters Association 3A State Champions 2017.

== Encore! ==
The schools Encore Choir program won the 2025 show choir state competition.

== Sexting scandal ==
In 2015, a major sexting scandal at the school involving a significant portion of the student body, including members of the football team, was covered by the media.
