= Cañon City, Colorado =

Home rule city in Fremont County, Colorado, United States

- Home rule city
- City of Cañon City
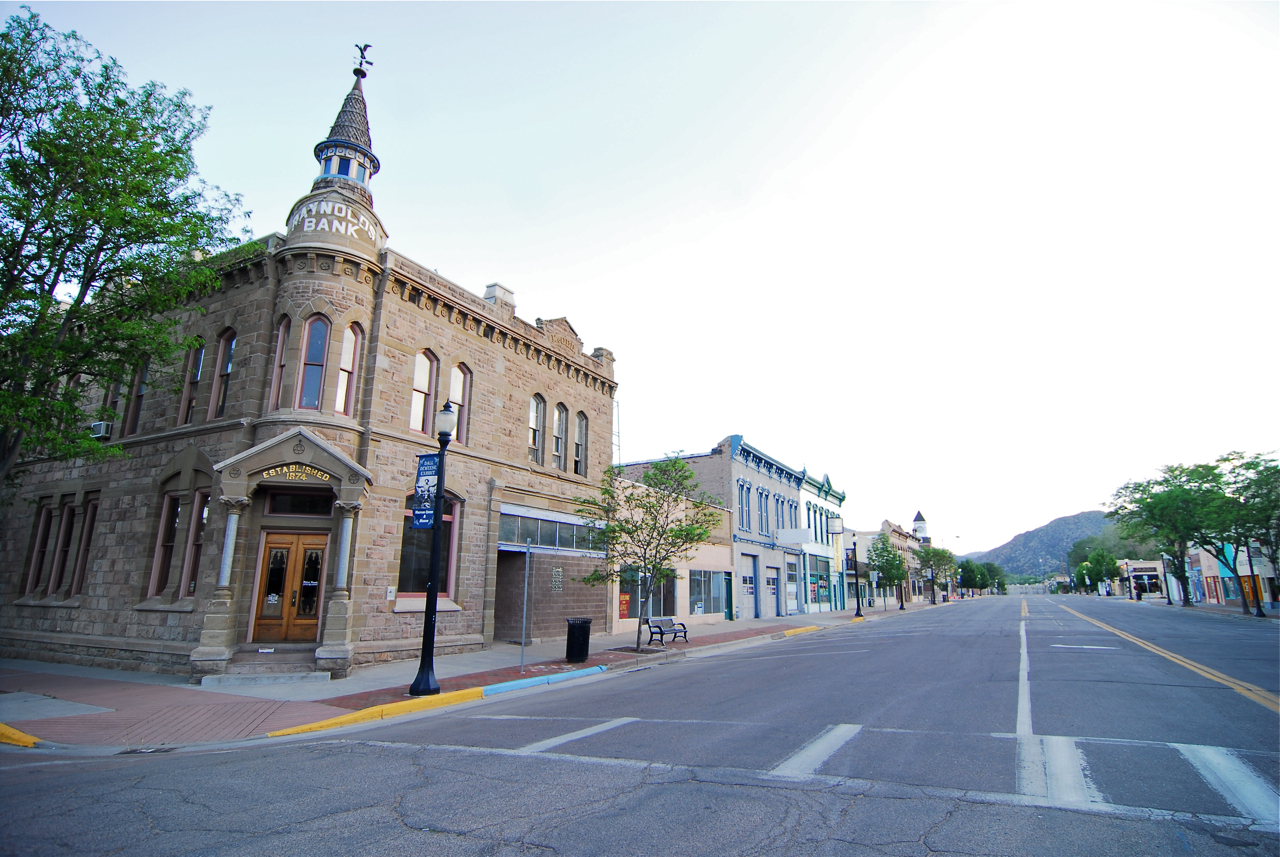
- Downtown Cañon City, 2010
- Nicknames: Climate Capital of Colorado
- Motto: Gateway to the Authentic West
- Location of the City of Cañon City in Fremont County, Colorado
- Coordinates: 38°25′42″N 105°14′21″W
- Country: United States
- State: Colorado
- County: Fremont
- Settled: 1860
- Incorporated: April 3, 1872

Government
  - Type: Home rule city
  - Mayor: Phil Lund (term ends 12/2027).

Area
  - Total: 12.404 sq mi (32.127 km^{2})
  - Land: 12.392 sq mi (32.095 km^{2})
  - Water: 0.012 sq mi (0.032 km^{2})
- Elevation: 5,351 ft (1,631 m)

Population (2020)
  - Total: 17,141
  - Density: 1,383/sq mi (534/km^{2})
- Time zone: UTC−07:00 (MST)
  - Summer (DST): UTC−06:00 (MDT)
- ZIP code: 81212, 81215 (PO Box)
- Area code: 719
- GNIS city ID: 2409976
- FIPS code: 08-11810
- Website: www.canoncity.org

Cañon City (/ˈkænjən/ KAN-yən) is the home rule city that is the county seat of and the most populous municipality in Fremont County, Colorado, United States. The city population was 17,141 at the 2020 United States census. Cañon City is the principal city of the Cañon City, CO Micropolitan Statistical Area and it is a part of the Front Range Urban Corridor. Cañon City straddles the easterly flowing Arkansas River and is a popular tourist destination for sightseeing, whitewater rafting, and rock climbing. The city is known for its many public parks, fossil discoveries, Skyline Drive, The Royal Gorge Railroad, the Royal Gorge, and extensive natural hiking paths. In 1994, the United States Board on Geographic Names approved adding the tilde to the official name of Cañon City, a change from Canon City as the official name in its decisions of 1906 and 1975. It is one of the few U.S. cities to have the Spanish Ñ in its name, others being La Cañada Flintridge, California; Española, New Mexico; Peñasco, New Mexico; and Peñitas, Texas.

== History ==
Cañon City, Kansas Territory, was laid out on January 17, 1858, during the Pike's Peak Gold Rush, but then the land was left idle. A new company "jumped the claim" to the town's site in late 1859, and it put up the first building in February 1860. The Cañon City, Kansas Territory, post office opened on December 13, 1860. The spelling of the town's name frequently omitted the tilde over the Spanish letter ñ. This town was originally intended as a commercial center for mining in South Park and the upper Arkansas River.

=== 1860s to 1900 ===
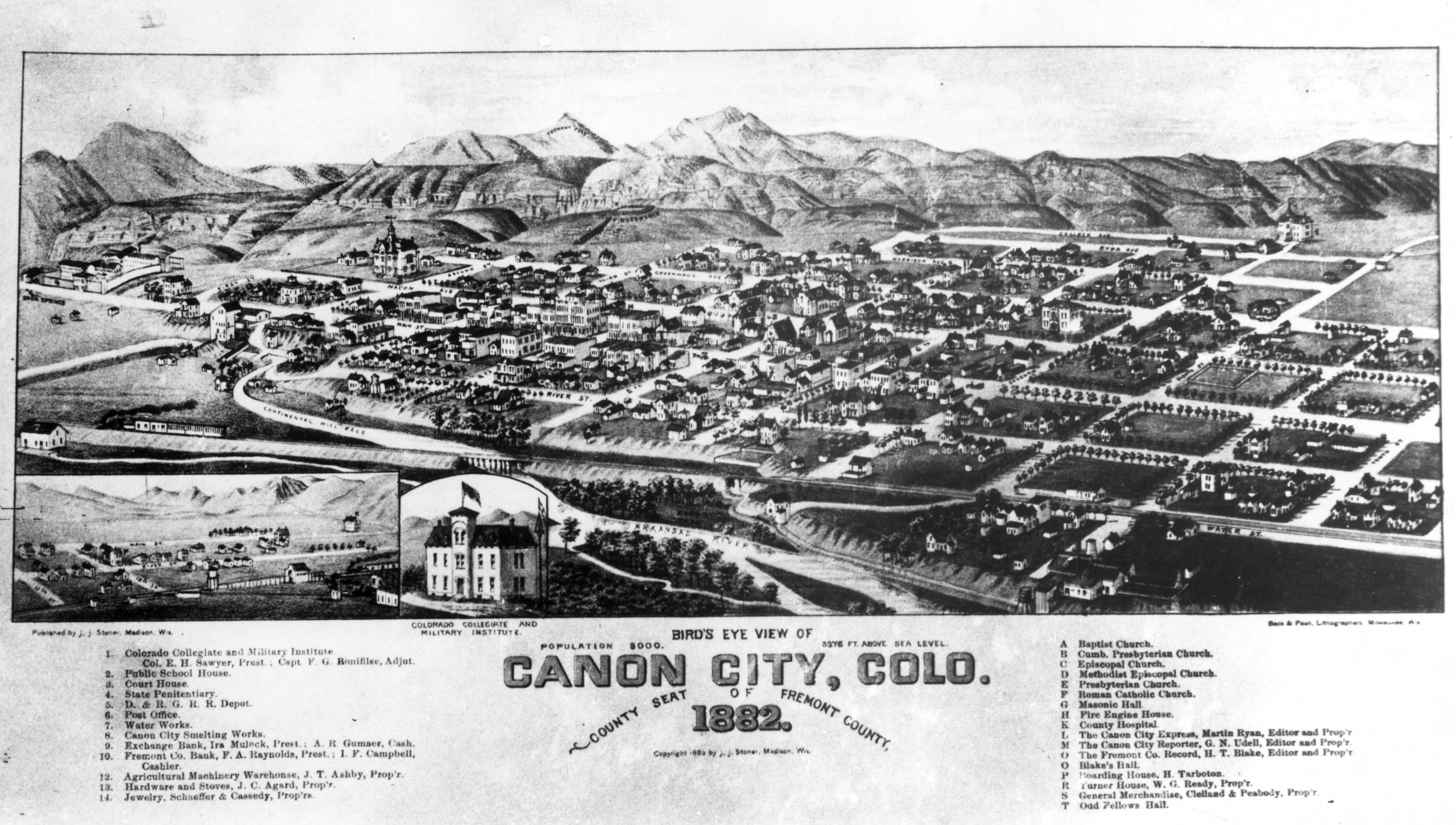
Bird's eye view of dwellings, commercial and civic buildings between the Arkansas River and mountains in This drawing of Canon City, Colorado, 1882.

The new Territory of Colorado was organized on February 28, 1861, and Fremont County, Colorado Territory was created on November 1, 1861, with Cañon City as the first and only county seat.

In 1861, the town raised two companies of volunteers to serve with the Second Colorado Infantry during the American Civil War. This regiment fought in skirmishes in nearby New Mexico and as far east as the Indian Territory (Oklahoma) and Missouri before ending its organization in 1865.

In 1862, A. M. Cassaday drilled for petroleum 6 miles (10 km) north of Cañon City, close to a known oil seep. Cassaday struck oil at the depth of 50 feet (15 m), and he completed the first commercial oil well west of the Mississippi River. He drilled five or six more wells nearby, and he refined kerosene and fuel oil from the petroleum. Cassaday sold the products in Denver.

Congress approved the Territory of Colorado's request for funds to construct a penitentiary in 1867. The Colorado Territorial Penitentiary opened in 1871, becoming Colorado's first prison. The original structure held 43 prisoners, though the number of incarcerated people increased steadily to over 400 people by the turn of the century. Records of inmate labor at the penitentiary date to 1872, including numerous complaints that inmates were not receiving full compensation for their work. Incarcerated workers contributed significantly to the development of the city, including the construction of Skyline Drive by 60 inmates. The scenic road opened in 1905.

The City of Cañon City was incorporated on April 3, 1872. A number of metal ore smelters were built in Cañon City following the discovery of gold at Cripple Creek in 1891. On July 30, 1904, the spelling of the Cañon City post office was changed to the common English spelling "Canyon City", but the spelling was changed back to the Spanish spelling "Cañon City" on December 15 of that year.

=== Historical designations ===
The Cañon City Downtown Historic District is an historic district that was listed on the National Register of Historic Places in 1983.

== Geography ==
Cañon City is located in eastern Fremont County. It sits primarily on the north side of the Arkansas River, just east of where the river exits from Royal Gorge. It is bordered to the south by the unincorporated community of Lincoln Park. Via U.S. Route 50, Pueblo is 39 miles (63 km) to the east and Poncha Springs is 62 miles (100 km) to the west. Colorado Springs is 45 miles (72 km) to the northeast.

At the 2020 United States census, the city had a total area of 7,939 acres (32.127 km^{2}) including 7.9 acres (0.032 km^{2}) of water.

=== Climate ===
The city's nickname, "the Climate Capital of Colorado", derives from the combination of unique geography and 5,300-foot (1,600 m) elevation protecting the city from harsh weather conditions. The average daily high temperature in January is 14 °F (7.8 °C) warmer in Cañon City than in Grand Junction, even though the elevation of Cañon City is higher.

The average minimum temperature in January is 20 °F (−7 °C). During July, overnight lows are 59 °F (15 °C) on average. Cañon City has a semi-arid climate (Köppen climate classification BSk).

Climate data for Cañon City, 1991–2020 normals, extremes 1893–present
Month	Jan	Feb	Mar	Apr	May	Jun	Jul	Aug	Sep	Oct	Nov	Dec	Year
Record high °F (°C)	80 (27)	82 (28)	91 (33)	90 (32)	98 (37)	104 (40)	107 (42)	102 (39)	100 (38)	95 (35)	83 (28)	82 (28)	107 (42)
Mean maximum °F (°C)	68.1 (20.1)	69.0 (20.6)	76.5 (24.7)	82.1 (27.8)	89.0 (31.7)	96.7 (35.9)	97.8 (36.6)	95.7 (35.4)	92.1 (33.4)	84.9 (29.4)	75.6 (24.2)	68.2 (20.1)	98.8 (37.1)
Mean daily maximum °F (°C)	49.4 (9.7)	50.4 (10.2)	58.5 (14.7)	64.3 (17.9)	73.3 (22.9)	84.6 (29.2)	89.2 (31.8)	86.7 (30.4)	80.1 (26.7)	68.6 (20.3)	57.2 (14.0)	49.0 (9.4)	67.6 (19.8)
Daily mean °F (°C)	33.9 (1.1)	35.0 (1.7)	42.3 (5.7)	48.8 (9.3)	58.2 (14.6)	68.4 (20.2)	73.9 (23.3)	72.0 (22.2)	64.2 (17.9)	52.4 (11.3)	41.8 (5.4)	33.8 (1.0)	52.1 (11.2)
Mean daily minimum °F (°C)	18.4 (−7.6)	19.7 (−6.8)	26.1 (−3.3)	33.2 (0.7)	43.0 (6.1)	52.2 (11.2)	58.7 (14.8)	57.2 (14.0)	48.4 (9.1)	36.1 (2.3)	26.3 (−3.2)	18.7 (−7.4)	36.5 (2.5)
Mean minimum °F (°C)	−1.5 (−18.6)	2.2 (−16.6)	11.3 (−11.5)	20.2 (−6.6)	30.8 (−0.7)	42.9 (6.1)	51.9 (11.1)	50.0 (10.0)	36.1 (2.3)	21.2 (−6.0)	9.0 (−12.8)	−1.6 (−18.7)	−8.5 (−22.5)
Record low °F (°C)	−24 (−31)	−30 (−34)	−13 (−25)	5 (−15)	15 (−9)	30 (−1)	35 (2)	35 (2)	25 (−4)	−3 (−19)	−24 (−31)	−25 (−32)	−30 (−34)
Average precipitation inches (mm)	0.55 (14)	0.57 (14)	1.04 (26)	1.76 (45)	1.56 (40)	0.85 (22)	2.25 (57)	2.06 (52)	1.20 (30)	0.87 (22)	0.55 (14)	0.46 (12)	13.72 (348)
Average snowfall inches (cm)	6.7 (17)	6.2 (16)	6.0 (15)	4.1 (10)	0.5 (1.3)	0.0 (0.0)	0.0 (0.0)	0.0 (0.0)	0.2 (0.51)	3.3 (8.4)	5.1 (13)	6.2 (16)	38.3 (97.21)
Average precipitation days (≥ 0.01 in)	3.7	4.7	5.6	6.8	8.4	7.4	11.6	12.0	6.5	5.4	4.5	4.1	80.7
Average snowy days (≥ 0.1 in)	3.4	3.9	3.0	2.1	0.4	0.0	0.0	0.0	0.0	1.0	2.5	3.8	20.1
Source 1: NOAA
Source 2: National Weather Service

=== Neighborhoods ===
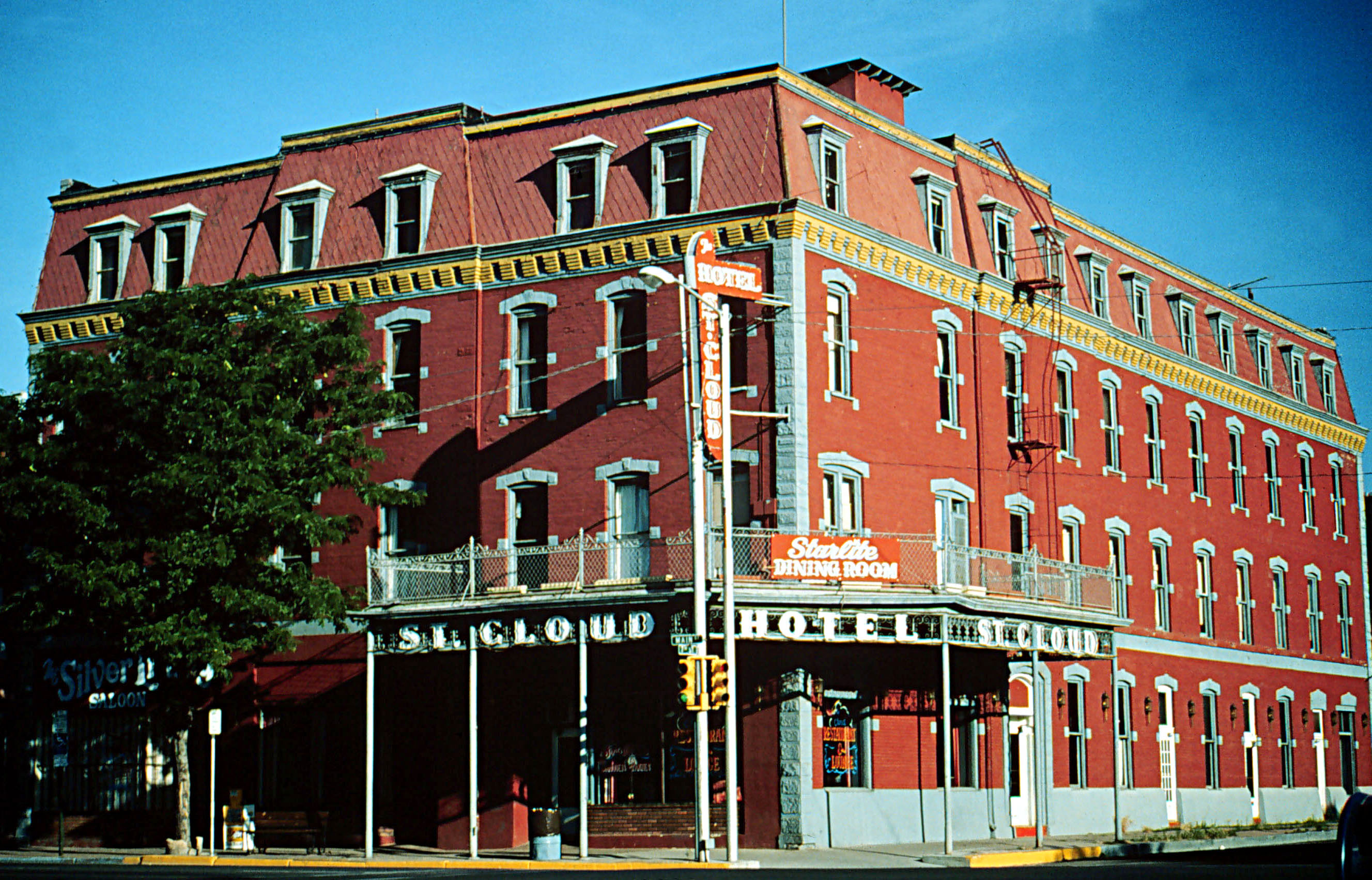
Located in Cañon City's National Historic District, the St. Cloud Hotel has stood at the corner of 7th and Main since 1888. It is currently unoccupied and in disrepair after a string of failed attempts to revive the business. The hotel was moved, brick by brick, from Silver Cliff, Colorado, in 1888.

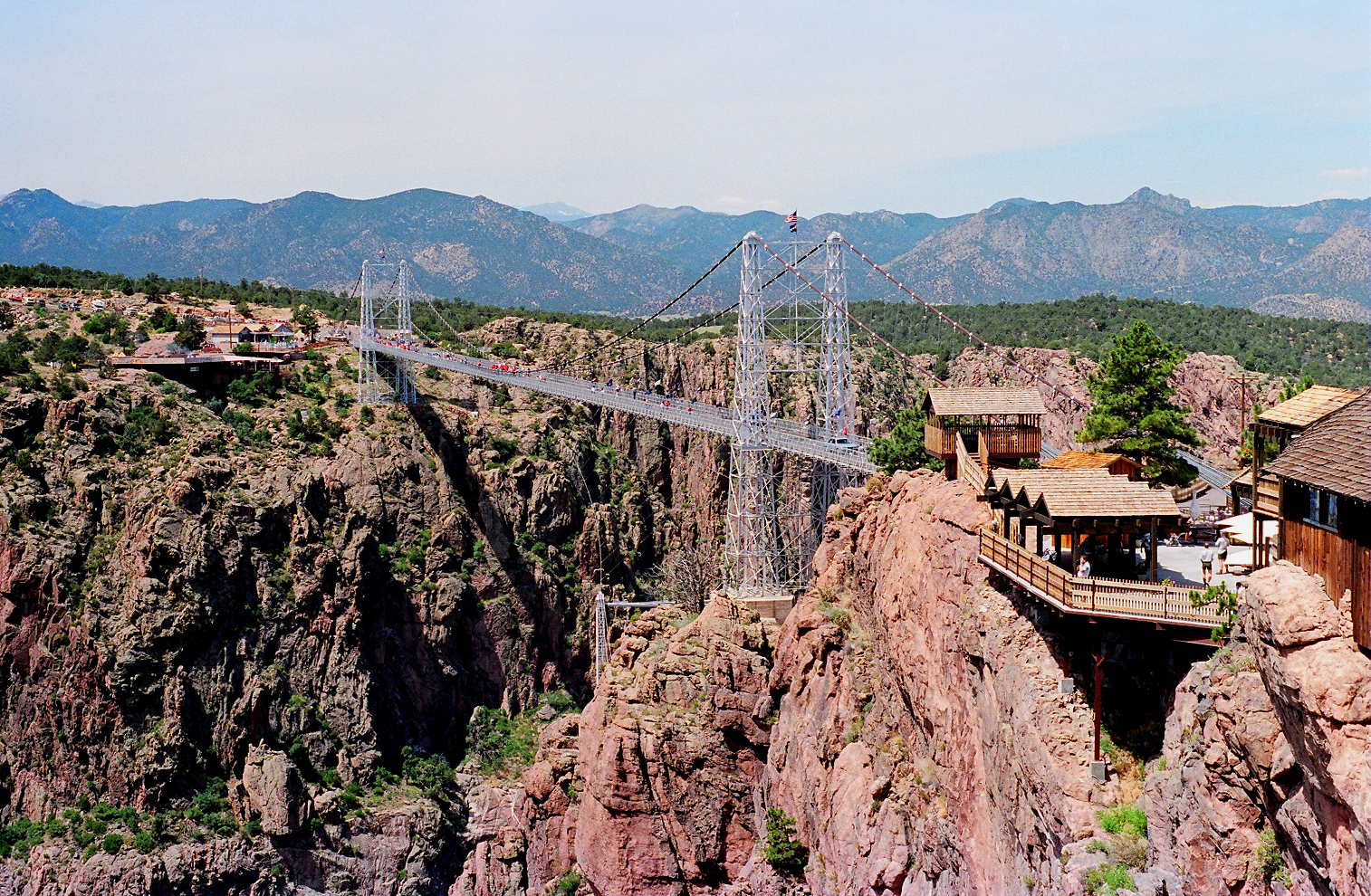
Royal Gorge Bridge in 1987

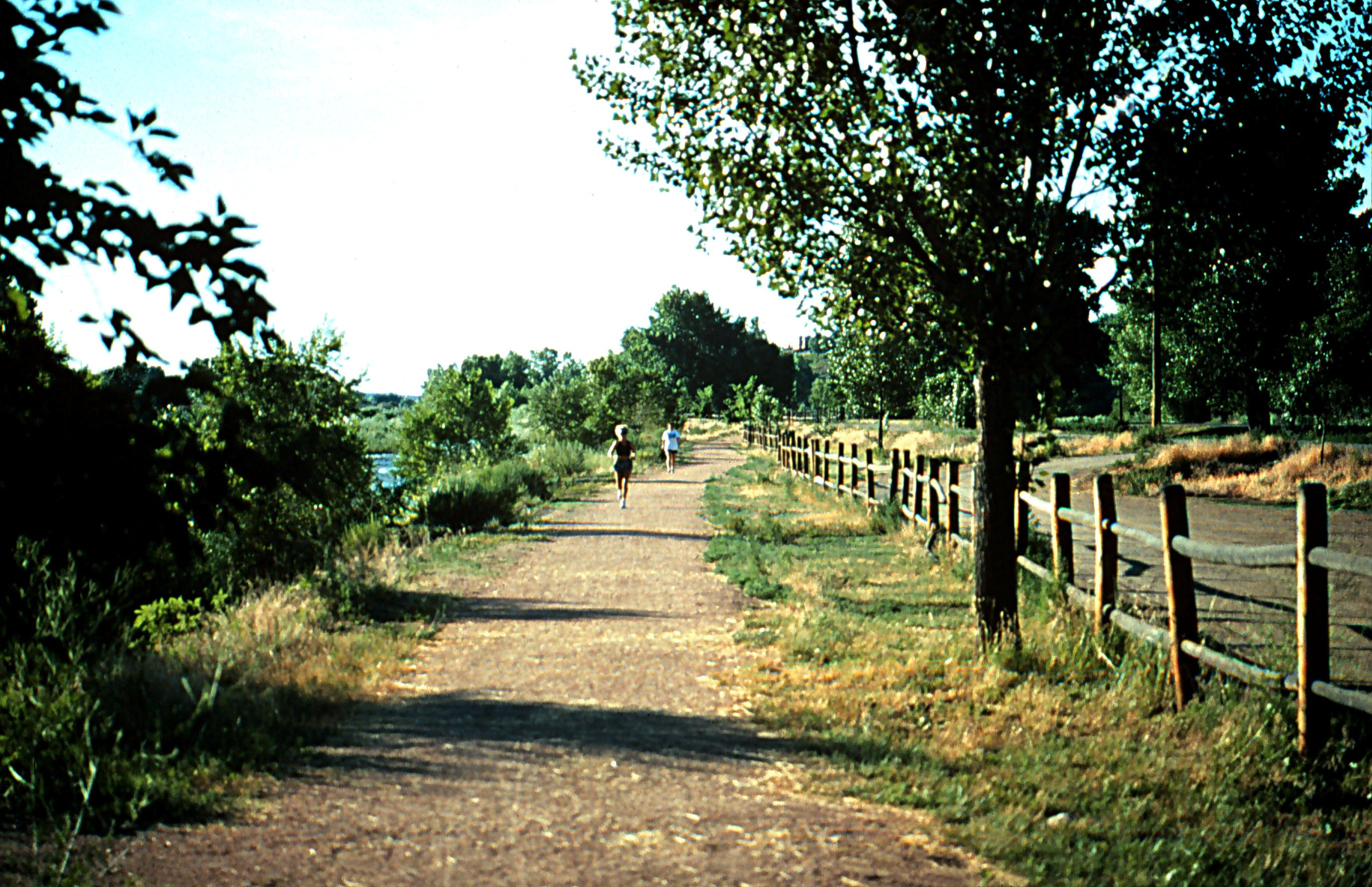
Arkansas Riverwalk in Cañon City is part of John Griffin Regional Park. It is owned and operated by the Cañon City Area Metropolitan Recreation and Park District.

As Cañon City has grown, the city has both annexed surrounding communities and developed new subdivisions to create the city that exists today.

- Dawson Ranch
- Eagle Heights
- Fireman's Bluff
- Four Mile Ranch
- Gold Cañon
- Meadowbrook
- Orchard Park
- South Cañon, a historic neighborhood located on the west side south of the Arkansas River
- Sunrise Mesa
- Western Meadows
- Wolf Park
- Five Star Mobile Home park

== Parks and recreation ==
Cañon City is home to many city-owned parks, as well as parks owned by the Cañon City Area Recreation and Park District.

=== City-owned parks ===
- Centennial Park, commonly known as "Duck Park"
- Denver & Rio Grande Western Park, commonly known as "Depot Park"
- Greydene Park
- Magdalene Park
- Margaret Park (originally Margarette Park)
- Mountain View Park, home of the city's skate park
- Red Canyon Park, a 500-acre (200 ha) park located 10 miles (16 km) north of the city
- Royal Gorge Park, home of the Royal Gorge Bridge and Park
- Rudd Park
- Temple Canyon Park
- Veterans Park, known for Entertainment in the Park concerts during the summer

=== Cañon City Area Recreation and Park District ===
The Cañon City Area Recreation and Park District, commonly called the Rec District, was created in 1965 to better serve the community's recreational needs with parks, the R.C. Icabone Pool (a public swimming pool), a dog park, an archery range and a ropes course along with a rec district office with a community room.

The following parks are operated and owned by the Rec District:

- John Griffin Park, located near the Sell's Avenue Trailhead of the Riverwalk
- Harrison Park, the former playground of the former Harrison Elementary School which had been relocated to a newer, larger school building housing both elementary and middle school students
- Pathfinder Regional Park, a joint-managed park located in the county between Cañon City and Florence
- Rouse Park

In addition, the city maintains the Tunnel Drive Trail, a four-mile long out-and-back trail that follows the course of an old irrigation canal. The trailhead is located at the west end of Tunnel Drive, just inside the city limits.

The Guy U. Hardy Award for Service to Outdoor Recreation was created in the name of Guy U. Hardy to recognize people in the community who "help preserve, protect and advocate for providing outdoor recreation opportunities." Hardy had a significant impact on outdoor recreational opportunities in the Royal Gorge area.

== Demographics ==
Historical population
Census	Pop.	Note	%±
1870	229		—
1880	1,501		555.5%
1890	2,825		88.2%
1900	3,775		33.6%
1910	5,162		36.7%
1920	4,551		−11.8%
1930	5,938		30.5%
1940	6,690		12.7%
1950	6,345		−5.2%
1960	8,973		41.4%
1970	9,206		2.6%
1980	13,037		41.6%
1990	12,687		−2.7%
2000	15,431		21.6%
2010	16,400		6.3%
2020	17,141		4.5%
U.S. Decennial Census

=== 2020 census ===
As of the 2020 census, Cañon City had a population of 17,141. The median age was 45.4 years. 19.0% of residents were under the age of 18 and 25.3% of residents were 65 years of age or older. For every 100 females there were 102.4 males, and for every 100 females age 18 and over there were 102.1 males age 18 and over.

98.1% of residents lived in urban areas, while 1.9% lived in rural areas.

There were 7,107 households in Cañon City, of which 23.7% had children under the age of 18 living in them. Of all households, 42.3% were married-couple households, 19.7% were households with a male householder and no spouse or partner present, and 31.5% were households with a female householder and no spouse or partner present. About 35.3% of all households were made up of individuals and 19.3% had someone living alone who was 65 years of age or older.

There were 7,631 housing units, of which 6.9% were vacant. The homeowner vacancy rate was 1.9% and the rental vacancy rate was 6.9%.

Racial composition as of the 2020 census
Race	Number	Percent
White	14,589	85.1%
Black or African American	268	1.6%
American Indian and Alaska Native	225	1.3%
Asian	115	0.7%
Native Hawaiian and Other Pacific Islander	9	0.1%
Some other race	675	3.9%
Two or more races	1,260	7.4%
Hispanic or Latino (of any race)	1,888	11.0%

== Law ==
Along with a police department, sheriff's office and detention center, and a municipal court, Cañon City is home to the courts for Fremont County and the 11th Judicial District of Colorado. It has been described as "America’s cheeriest prison town".

== Government ==
Cañon City is governed via the Council–manager government system. The city council consists of seven members who are elected from districts. The mayor is elected by the entire city.

== Economy ==
The area being situated along the Arkansas River has allowed for soil suitable to orchards, ranching, and farming, but has largely grown to rely on the large number of state and federal prisons in the area, as well as to tourism, education, manufacturing, medicine and many other sectors.

=== Major employers ===
Cañon City depends on the Colorado Department of Corrections and federal prison system, and its tourism industry which includes the Royal Gorge Route Railroad, Royal Gorge Bridge and Park, Red Canyon Park, The Abbey winery, and various other attractions. The major local employers include downtown shops, the entrepreneurial TechSTART initiative that attracts major technology-based entrepreneurs, and CommonSpirit (owner of St. Thomas More Hospital and the Progressive Care Center).

==== Prisons ====
Prisons have served an important significance to both Cañon City and the surrounding areas of Fremont County, as well as to the state of Colorado. The Museum of Colorado Prisons has been given the role of preserving and presenting the past of the state's corrections system. Colorado Department of Corrections operates the Colorado Territorial Correctional Facility in Cañon City. In addition to several correctional facilities near Cañon City in unincorporated areas in Fremont County, Colorado State Penitentiary, the location of the state death row and execution chamber is in Fremont County. Other state prisons in Fremont County include Arrowhead Correctional Center, Centennial Correctional Facility, Fremont Correctional Facility, Four Mile Correctional Center, ADX Florence, and Skyline Correctional Center.

On October 3, 1929, a riot at the prison claimed 13 lives.

The Colorado Women's Correctional Facility near Cañon City in unincorporated Fremont County was decommissioned on June 4, 2009.

==== Tourism ====
From Cañon City's Downtown Historic District located in the heart of the city to the Royal Gorge Bridge, there are many places to see and visit in the area.

== Media ==
Cañon City is home to a daily newspaper, called the Cañon City Daily Record; an FM radio station, Star Country 104.5 FM; and a long-running AM radio station, known as KRLN NewsRadio 1400 AM.

== Transportation ==
Transportation in the Cañon City area consists of cab service, shuttle bus service, and a downtown wagon ride. The Royal Gorge Bridge trolley had also been used during special events (it was destroyed in the Royal Gorge Fire, but it was reserved for use by the Royal Gorge Bridge & Park. Jeep tours and Segway tours are also available to explore local parks such as Red Canyon Park or scenic places such as Skyline Drive.

The town is served by the Fremont County airport (1V6) which is 6 miles to the East and currently has no scheduled passenger service. Within an hour's drive is the Colorado Springs Airport with daily service by major airlines.

=== Major roads and highways ===
The area is served by one state and one U.S. highway with a mix of city and county roads to navigate the city or connect to neighboring areas.

==== State and national highways ====
- U.S. Highway 50 - named Royal Gorge Boulevard from 1st Street to 15th Street in downtown Cañon
- State Highway 115 - connects the city to nearby Florence and Penrose, ending in Colorado Springs

==== City and county roads ====
- 4th Street - connecting Downtown with South Cañon, Oak Creek Grade, Prospect Heights, and Capitol Hill
- 5th Street - serves as a north-south connector from Downtown north, allows traffic from Skyline Drive to return to U.S. 50
- 9th Street - serves as a carrier of CO 115 from the roundabout to the junction with U.S. 50, heads north and ends at Washington Street
- 15th Street - main route north to the hospital, a fire station and a small cluster of businesses
- Orchard Avenue
- Raynolds Avenue/Ash Street - runs from center of East Cañon to CO 115 via a county road, changes to a gravel road and becomes Chandler Road
- MacKenzie / Four Mile Lane - routed to connect from CO 115 as a carrier of CR 20 until the city limits, at Hwy 50, heads north as Four Mile Lane

==== Bus service ====
- Cañon City is part of Colorado's Bustang network. It is on the Alamosa-Pueblo Outrider line.

==== Scenic routes ====
- Skyline Drive, major scenic route overlooking Cañon City that was originally built by local inmates at the Territorial Prison

==== Railroads ====
- The Union Pacific Railroad mothballed the Tennessee Pass line in 1997. In 1998 Rock and Rail LLC was formed, and began operating on the former Union Pacific track between Cañon City and Parkdale. It also operates between Pueblo and Cañon City on lines purchased from the UP Railway. The tourist line Cañon City and Royal Gorge Railroad also operates on the RRRR's track.

== Education ==
See also Cañon City School District

Cañon City's school system is under the direction of the Cañon City School District Fremont RE-1. The district currently has four elementary schools, one charter school, one school serving as both an elementary school and middle school, one middle school and one high school, Cañon City High School.

Cañon City's higher education needs are served by the Pueblo Community College Fremont Campus, located on the west end of the city along U.S. Highway 50.

== Places of interest ==
=== Listed on the National Register of Historic Places ===
- Cañon City Downtown Historic District
- Cañon City Municipal Building, also known as the Royal Gorge Regional Museum and History Center
- Cañon City Post Office and Federal Building
- Cañon City State Armory

=== Other sites ===
- Colorado State Penitentiary
- Colorado Territorial Correctional Facility
- Holy Cross Abbey (Cañon City, Colorado)
- Museum of Colorado Prisons
- Peabody Mansion, home of the Cañon City Chamber of Commerce
- Royal Gorge Bridge and Park
- Royal Gorge Route Railroad

=== Defunct sites ===
- Buckskin Joe, closed in 2010

== Notable people ==
- Edgar Allen, anatomist and physiologist
- Robert Wesley Amick, artist
- Don Bendell, writer
- Jack Christiansen, NFL hall-of-famer (Detroit Lions)
- Donald S. Fredrickson, medical researcher, former director of the National Institutes of Health
- Kent Haruf, novelist, graduated from high school in Cañon City
- Skip Konte, musician, "Wizard of all Northern Realms"
- Vice Admiral Emory S. Land (U.S. Navy), born in Cañon City
- Bird Millman, stage name of Jeannadean Engleman, Circus Aerialist, born in Cañon City
- James Hamilton Peabody, former Colorado governor

== In popular culture ==
The movie Canon City (1948) depicts the real-life 1947 escape of 12 prisoners from nearby Colorado State Penitentiary.

Cañon City, Colorado is referenced as the location of the fourth stage of the Steel Ball Run race, in the seventh part of JoJo's Bizarre Adventure. The stage begins in Cañon City in Chapter 32 of the series.

A diner in Cañon City is the setting of the song "Navajo Rug", which was named by the Western Writers of America as one of the Top 100 Western Songs of all time.

A fictional version of the city is depicted in Philip K. Dick's alternate history novel The Man in the High Castle (1962).

== Sister cities ==
Cañon City's sister cities are:

- Chalchicomula de Sesma, Mexico
- Kahoku, Japan
- Valday, Russia

== See also ==
- Front Range Urban Corridor
- Colorado State Penitentiary
- Royal Gorge
