= List of lowest-income counties in the United States =

These are lists of the lowest-income counties in the United States, based on measures of per capita personal income and median household income. This article lists counties by per capita personal income (PCPI), a more comprehensive measurement of an individual's income than per capita income (PCI).

== 50 counties/parishes with lowest median household income ==
United States of America: $77,719

Rank	County / Parish	State	Median household income (2023)
1	Claiborne County	Mississippi	$28,579
2	Holmes County	Mississippi	$30,542
3	Humphreys County	Mississippi	$31,538
4	Buffalo County	South Dakota	$32,803
5	Leflore County	Mississippi	$33,945
6	Perry County	Alabama	$34,176
7	Wilcox County	Alabama	$34,426
8	East Carroll Parish	Louisiana	$34,604
9	Greene County	Alabama	$34,619
10	Madison Parish	Louisiana	$34,704
11	Owsley County	Kentucky	$35,000
12	Quitman County	Mississippi	$35,150
13	McDowell County	West Virginia	$35,161
14	Allendale County	South Carolina	$35,477
15	Martin County	Kentucky	$35,522
16	Coahoma County	Mississippi	$35,552
17	Bell County	Kentucky	$35,566
18	Tensas Parish	Louisiana	$35,670
19	Bullock County	Alabama	$36,204
20	Wilkinson County	Mississippi	$36,240
21	Clay County	Kentucky	$36,330
22	McCreary County	Kentucky	$36,348
23	Brooks County	Texas	$36,695
24	Lee County	Arkansas	$36,735
25	Zavala County	Texas	$36,878
26	Harlan County	Kentucky	$36,916
27	Issaquena County	Mississippi	$36,986
28	Sumter County	Alabama	$37,021
29	Sharkey County	Mississippi	$37,098
30	Mineral County	Colorado	$37,108
31	Morehouse Parish	Louisiana	$37,255
32	Phillips County	Arkansas	$37,338
33	Noxubee County	Mississippi	$37,567
34	Jefferson County	Mississippi	$37,617
35	Knox County	Kentucky	$37,640
36	Clay County	Georgia	$37,858
37	Lee County	Kentucky	$37,939
38	Mingo County	West Virginia	$38,358
39	Luna County	New Mexico	$38,641
40	Costilla County	Colorado	$38,731
41	Starr County	Texas	$38,824
42	Dallas County	Alabama	$39,013
43	Hancock County	Tennessee	$39,077
44	Washington County	Mississippi	$39,081
45	Claiborne Parish	Louisiana	$39,576
46	Tunica County	Mississippi	$39,659
47	Bienville Parish	Louisiana	$39,743
48	Jefferson Davis County	Mississippi	$39,794
49	Leslie County	Kentucky	$39,855
50	Clinton County	Kentucky	$39,877

== 50 counties/parishes with lowest per capita personal income ==
Two common measurements of the average annual income of individuals in the United States are: per capita income (PCI) and per capita personal income (PCPI). Per capita personal income is the more comprehensive of the two measures, and thus PCPI for an individual, county, or state will be higher than PCI. The following table is a listing of counties by PCPI. Many of these counties are home to prisons, which lowers their per capita personal incomes.

United States of America: $69,810

Rank	County / Parish	State	Per capita personal income (2023)	Notes
1	Wheeler County	Georgia	$24,588	Location of Wheeler Correctional Facility
2	Crowley County	Colorado	$25,013	Location of Crowley County Correctional Facility and Arkansas Valley Correctional Facility
3	Union County	Florida	$28,946	Location of Union Correctional Institution
4	Madison County	Idaho	$29,168	Location of Brigham Young University–Idaho
5	Elliott County	Kentucky	$29,689	Location of Little Sandy Correctional Complex
6	Forest County	Pennsylvania	$30,606	Location of State Correctional Institution – Forest
7	Lake County	Tennessee	$32,554	Location of Northwest Correctional Complex
8	Lincoln County	Arkansas	$32,565	Location of Cummins and Varner correctional prisons
9	Wilcox County	Georgia	$32,581	Location of Wilcox State Prison
10	Charlton County	Georgia	$32,717	Location of D. Ray James Correctional Institution
11	Starr County	Texas	$32,785
12	Glades County	Florida	$32,897	Location of Moore Haven Correctional Facility
13	Hancock County	Tennessee	$33,223
14	Noble County	Ohio	$33,492	Location of Noble Correctional Institution
15	Martin County	Kentucky	$33,523	Location of USP Big Sandy
16	Telfair County	Georgia	$34,086	Location of Telfair State Prison and McRae Correctional Institution
17	Bent County	Colorado	$34,152	Location of Bent County Correctional Facility
18	Zapata County	Texas	$34,154
19	Johnson County	Georgia	$34,237	Location of Johnson State Prison
20	Echols County	Georgia	$34,289
21	Greene County	Mississippi	$34,362	Location of South Mississippi Correctional Institution
22	Hidalgo County	Texas	$34,373
23	Morgan County	Kentucky	$34,380	Location of Eastern Kentucky Correctional Complex
24	Webster County	West Virginia	$34,445
25	DeSoto County	Florida	$34,786	Location of Desoto Annex state prison
26	Clayton County	Georgia	$34,871
27	McCreary County	Kentucky	$35,036	Location of USP McCreary
28	Cibola County	New Mexico	$35,144	Location of Cibola County Correctional Center; County lies partly in Zuni Indian Reservation
29	Lanier County	Georgia	$35,327
30	Tattnall County	Georgia	$35,381
31	East Carroll Parish	Louisiana	$35,475
32	Johnson County	Arkansas	$35,549
33	Calhoun County	Georgia	$35,593	Location of Calhoun State Prison
34	Liberty County	Florida	$35,661	Location of Liberty Correctional Institution
35	Searcy County	Arkansas	$35,719
36	McDowell County	West Virginia	$35,813	Location of FCI McDowell
37	Willacy County	Texas	$35,832	Location of Willacy County State Jail and Willacy County Regional Detention Center
38	Dixie County	Florida	$35,895	Location of Cross City Correctional Institution
39	Walker County	Texas	$35,913	Location of Texas State Penitentiary at Huntsville
40	Lafayette County	Florida	$35,986	Location of Mayo Correctional Institution Annex
41	Bledsoe County	Tennessee	$36,038	Location of Bledsoe County Correctional Complex
42	Issaquena County	Mississippi	$36,046	Location of Issaquena County Correctional Facility
43	Bullock County	Alabama	$36,061	Location of Bullock Correctional Facility
44	McKinley County	New Mexico	$36,133	County lies partly in Zuni Indian Reservation
45	Fulton County	Arkansas	$36,218
46	Oglala Lakota County	South Dakota	$36,222	County lies entirely within Pine Ridge Indian Reservation
47	Buffalo County	South Dakota	$36,239	Most of county lies within Crow Creek Indian Reservation
48	Lee County	Kentucky	$36,462
49	Hancock County	Georgia	$36,621	Location of Hancock State Prison
50	Atkinson County	Georgia	$36,641

== See also ==
- List of highest-income counties in the United States
- List of United States counties by per capita income
- Persistent poverty county
