= San Carlos Correctional Facility =

Prison in Pueblo, Colorado, United States

Coordinates: 38°16′45″N 104°37′39″W

- Interactive map of San Carlos Correctional Facility
- Location: 1503 Hood Avenue Pueblo, Colorado
- Status: open
- Security class: mixed
- Capacity: 250
- Opened: 1995
- Managed by: Colorado Department of Corrections

San Carlos Correctional Facility (SCCF) is a maximum security facility on the campus of the Colorado Mental Health Institute in Pueblo, Colorado.

SCCF houses inmates with special needs, such as severe mental illness or severe developmental disabilities. Inmates at SCCF are temporarily transferred there from other state prisons in order to receive specialized care.

== History ==
in 2013, 35 year old inmate Christopher Lopez, who had been incarcerated multiple times and suffered from bipolar schizoaffective disorder, died from hyponatremia, a condition caused by a lack of sodium in the blood while staff members ignored his seizures and shackled him to a chair. His mother in a lawsuit filed against the Colorado Department of Corrections suggested that the condition was caused by over-consumption of psychotropic medication, and she asserted that this death could have been prevented.

Staff noticed Lopez lying on his cell floor around 3:30 AM on the 17th of March. The staff demanded that he put his hands through a handcuff slot. As he was too weak to obey the orders, the staff thought he was intentionally not responding as they removed him from the cell, put a spit hood on him, restrained him in a chair, and considered using pepper spray on him. During this, he suffered from two grand mal seizures and from labored breathing which was ignored by staff. At 9:10 AM, he died after being taken out of the chair and restrained on the floor. Six hours of video were caught of the incident, including the staff having unrelated conversations, as well as a mental health clinician saying "I can see you breathing." to Lopez, who was already dead at that point. A nurse did enter his room, however she only administered his psychotropic medication and left without checking any vitals. Eventually staff noticed he was not breathing, and they began performing CPR. EMTs arrived and ordered the video recording the incident be turned off.

After the incident, it took 17 months for the it to be reported to the state department of health, despite state law stating that inmate deaths be reported after a single day. Eventually, Lopez's mother filed a lawsuit that ended with a 3 million dollar settlement. Three employees were fired, and five were disciplined and health protocol training was implemented to prevent future incidents.

== Notable Inmates ==
- James Holmes, the proponent of the 2012 Aurora theater shooting was moved into San Carlos Correctional Facility in 2016 from Colorado State Penitentiary. Despite SCCF's specialty in inmates with special needs, Holmes was not transported here for the schizophrenia disorder he was diagnosed with, with a spokeswoman for the Colorado Department of Corrections stating that mental health was not a factor in the move. He was later moved to USP Allenwood, a facility in Pennsylvania.
