= Tina Peters (politician) =

American politician and convicted felon (born 1955)

Clerk and Recorder of Mesa County
- In office January 2019 – January 2023
- Succeeded by: Bobbie Gross

Personal details
- Born: September 11, 1955 (age 71)
- Party: Republican
- Education: Clayton College of Natural Health (BS, non-accredited)
- Criminal information
- Status: Released on parole on June 1, 2026
- Conviction: Convicted October 8, 2024 on 7 of 10 counts related to election interference
- Criminal charges: Influencing a public servant, conspiracy to impersonate, official misconduct, violation of duty, and failing to follow Colorado's Secretary of State regulations
- Penalty: 9 years incarceration

Tina Marie Peters (born September 11, 1955) is an American politician and convicted felon who served as County Clerk of Mesa County, Colorado, from 2019 to 2023. In 2021, she was temporarily suspended by the Colorado Secretary of State, and was convicted of criminal charges related to efforts to overturn the 2020 election of Joe Biden as U.S. President. In August 2024, she was convicted in Colorado state court on seven charges—four of which were felonies—relating to unauthorized access to election machines. She was subsequently sentenced to nine years of incarceration. On December 11, 2025, President Donald Trump claimed to have pardoned Peters, though that had no effect on her state convictions. Following Trump's threats to withhold federal funding from Colorado, on May 15, 2026, Colorado Governor Jared Polis commuted Peters' sentence. She was released on parole on June 1, 2026.

== Education and career ==
Peters holds a degree in holistic nutrition from the non-accredited correspondence school Clayton College of Natural Health. She sold alternative medical products in association with a multi-level marketing company named Nikken. Peters also helped manage her former husband's construction company. Peters, a member of the Republican Party, was elected county clerk of Mesa County, Colorado, in 2018, her first elected office. She had campaigned on a platform calling for improved service from the Clerk and Recorder's motor vehicle offices.

In February 2020, employees in Peters' office discovered an unemptied ballot box in a parking lot in front of the Mesa County election headquarters in Grand Junction, containing 574 ballots cast in the November 2019 election. The ballots had remained there, uncounted, for months, which Peters attributed to "human error". Given the margin of victory in Mesa County elections, this late finding did not change the outcome of any race. This incident and other issues led to a voter recall attempt for Peters from April to August 2020. The recall effort failed by approximately 1,200 signatures to reach the 12,129 required for the question to appear on the ballot in the November 3, 2020, general election. On November 8, 2021, the Colorado Secretary of State filed a lawsuit against Peters over her fundraising efforts and failure to report contributions and expenses for nearly three years.

On January 13, 2022, Peters formally filed as a candidate for reelection as Mesa County Clerk and Recorder. On February 14, 2022, she dropped her candidacy to run in the Republican primary election for Colorado Secretary of State, which concluded on June 28, 2022. She came in second out of three candidates, and stated that she did not accept the result, suggesting election fraud. News coverage described her as one of several election deniers running for positions of management or influence over future elections. In late July 2022, Peters paid the $256,000 required for the state to conduct a manual recount of votes cast in the primary election. The recount barely changed the totals, with Peters gaining 13 votes, and still having a vote share of 29 percent.

On October 4, 2023, the Colorado Office of Administrative Courts fined Peters $15,400 for violating the Fair Campaign Practice Act by failing to register as a candidate, and failing to file accurate campaign donation and expenditure reports while running for reelection for Mesa County Clerk and Recorder. Though she formally filed on January 13, 2022, the violations occurred between September 2021 and February 2022, before she dropped out of that race on February 14.

== Computer breach: 2020 United States presidential election ==
After elections, Mesa County uses a risk-limiting audit procedure to ensure that the results on paper ballots match the results reported by tabulation machines. The audit process involves a bipartisan group of staff and volunteers to randomly select a number of paper ballots and manually check those results against the results issued by a tabulation machine. On November 19, 2020, Peters signed off on the results of the risk-limiting audit for Mesa County, stating there were no issues or discrepancies with the results of the 2020 election in the county.

Despite signing documents that agreed there were no discrepancies in the election results for the county, Peters met with individuals who promoted the false claim that the 2020 election was illegitimate. In the months following the 2020 election, she allowed an unauthorized person to access the Mesa County's Dominion electronic voting machines and to copy the hard drives of those machines. In 2024, Peters was convicted in Colorado's 21st judicial district on felony charges relating to this unauthorized access and was sentenced to nine years in prison. She was also ordered to pay thousands of dollars in fines. She was immediately taken into custody.

=== Granting unauthorized access to voting machines ===
In May 2021, Peters ordered surveillance cameras monitoring the voting machines in the clerk's office turned off, and that they would be reactivated in advance of the next election in August 2021, according to an email sent by Mesa County Deputy Clerk Belinda Knisley and later cited in evidence by Colorado Secretary of State Jena Griswold. Peters later stated that no law or election rule required security cameras that monitor election equipment to operate continuously; at minimum, they must be on 60 days before an election and 30 days afterward. Mesa County Commissioner Janet Rowland stated that Peters had not turned off the cameras after any of the eight previous elections that Peters had overseen since 2018.

In the days following her order to turn off the surveillance cameras, Peters allowed Conan Hayes, co-founder of the clothing company RVCA and proponent of QAnon conspiracy theories, to access the room where Mesa County's electronic voting machines were stored and to copy sensitive information from those machines. Days later, Peters allowed Hayes to be present for a software update to the voting machines and to record video of the update taking place. Peters' chief aide, former deputy clerk Belinda Knisley, described Hayes as a "mystery man", and said that Peters told her she brought him in to access files from the voting machines because Peters "was afraid the Colorado Secretary of State's office was going to remove them".

During the time Hayes was present, he used a staff access badge for Gerald Wood, and according to Griswold, Peters misled her staff by saying "Wood" was an employee and had been background-checked. Phone records confirmed that Hayes had traveled to the area during the time of the software update. His hotel room was paid for by Sherronna Bishop, then-campaign manager for Boebert. Peters later said that she, Bishop, Hayes, and United States Representative Lauren Boebert had dinner together on May 24.

=== Publication of stolen voting machine data ===
In August 2021, Ron Watkins, conspiracy theorist and site administrator of the imageboard website 8kun, published computer files associated with the Mesa County election system, including "forensic images of Mesa County's voting machines along with video of [a software] update and partially blurred passwords" on a Telegram channel. The Gateway Pundit also published passwords, video, and data associated with the Mesa County election system.

Dominion, the company that made Mesa County's voting machines, identified the leaked passwords as belonging to the machines in Mesa County. The company alerted the state, and Griswold ordered an inspection of the county's voting equipment the following day and prohibited anyone from touching the equipment without her written permission. The order stated: "The posted images depict the BIOS passwords specific to the individual hardware stations of Mesa County's voting system. These passwords can only be used physically at a voting system at the Mesa County Clerk's Office." Mesa County District Attorney Dan Rubinstein assigned an investigator to look into the security breach. On August 10, Colorado Department of State staff accessed the county election equipment and some records at the Mesa County Clerk and Recorder's office. They found security vulnerabilities in the servers and boot settings. Peters described the search as a "raid" and, saying that her chief deputy had not been allowed to be present, said: "I don't know what they did, but I can tell you I don't trust them."

A day after state officials investigated the voting machines in Mesa County, Peters attended a 2020 election conspiracy conference held by Mike Lindell, CEO of MyPillow and conspiracy theorist. During the conference, Ron Watkins presented via livestream the computer files associated with the Mesa County election system he had shared on Telegram previously. He claimed "the files were from hard drives taken 'without authorization' from Peters' office", which he said his lawyer instructed him to disclose. At the conference, Peters denied the files had come from her office, and if they had, questioned if the leak of data was a problem. She claimed:

If those passwords were compromised, why can't they just change them? How many of you have had to change your email password before? Is that a big deal? You just change it. We're not in the middle of an election right now... It's not like some secret people came and did something nefarious.

=== Decertification of compromised voting machines ===
On August 12, 2021, Griswold issued Election Order 2021-02 (EO-02), which announced the decertification of the county's voting equipment, which would have to be replaced before the November election unless Mesa County chose to conduct a hand count of ballots. Additionally, Griswold announced that Peters could no longer oversee the 2021 election.

On August 17, 2021, the FBI investigated the alleged Mesa County election equipment breach alongside the Colorado Department of State's and County Treasurer's offices. Peters was not present when officials went to meet her and inspect the equipment. Griswold issued a third Election Order, 2021-03 (EO-03), stating that Peters was in hiding and not complying, and as such, Mesa County Treasurer and former Clerk and Recorder Sheila Reiner was permitted to take control of the Mesa County elections as Election Supervisor. Griswold appointed her Republican predecessor, former Colorado Secretary of State Wayne Williams, as the Designated Election Official. The U.S. Cyber Security and Infrastructure Security Agency (CISA) looked into the alleged breach and determined that the incident did not risk the integrity of elections in either the state or the country, according to the secretary of state's office. On August 19, 2021, MyPillow CEO Mike Lindell told Vice News in an interview that Peters was "holed up" in a safe house provided by him for her protection. A member of Lindell's own security team leaked the location, so she was moved to another unknown location. On August 21, 2021, a support rally was held for Peters in Mesa County; her supporters claimed there had been a security breach.

On August 24, 2021, the all-Republican Mesa County Board of County Commissioners voted unanimously to replace 41 compromised pieces of election equipment with new equipment also from Dominion Voting Systems. Thirty-four county residents spoke to the commission before the vote, all opposing the Dominion contract. The commissioners extended the service agreement for eight years (to 2029) and purchased a "Dominion Ballot Audit Review" for $3,300 per election, for a total cost of $825,281. The agreement with Dominion included a promise that the company would not file a civil lawsuit against the county over defamatory remarks allegedly made by Peters.

=== Removal from overseeing 2021 election ===
On August 30, Griswold filed a lawsuit to prevent Peters from overseeing the 2021 election, because the authority to terminate Peters lay with the courts and not with her. The county commissioners voted to reject Reiner, the clerk serving the county prior to Peters having been elected to the position, and instead appointed Williams, the former Colorado Secretary of State, to oversee Mesa County elections.

On August 23, 2021, Mesa County Human Resources Director Brenda Moore suspended Deputy Clerk Belinda Knisley with pay due to accusations of unprofessional behavior and hostile work environment. Mesa County Elections Manager Sandra Brown was also suspended. On August 25, Knisley entered the Clerk and Recorder's office, from which she had been barred, and tried to use Peters' credentials to print documents. She surrendered on September 1 to be charged with felony burglary and misdemeanor cybercrimes, and was released on a personal recognizance bond.

On September 17, 2021, Peters gave the county commissioners an 83-page report titled "Forensic Examination and Analysis" prepared by cyber forensic expert Doug Gould. The report included images of server hard drives and attempted to show that some files were deleted or replaced with other files; according to the report, the "trusted build" deleted a total of 28,989 log files but did not state the purpose of the files or whether they were supposed to be replaced with new files as part of a software upgrade. It concluded: "Further investigation is required to determine the full scope of non-compliance with legal mandates for voting systems and election records, and whether the non-compliance is deliberate or simply negligent." Griswold's office responded, "Prior to the routine upgrade to voting equipment called the 'trusted build', counties are directed to save to external media all data necessary to completely audit and verify a prior election. This data may be restored to the EMS after the trusted build. No court has ever held that voting system event logs are election records within the meaning of 52 U.S.C. § 20701."

On September 18, in response to a court filing to remove her from overseeing the next election, Peters stated that there had been an unauthorized person and non-employee present at the annual system upgrade but that Peters had been within her legal right to allow that person to be present. On October 13, 2021, Mesa County District Court Judge Valerie Robinson ruled that Peters and Knisley had allowed a breach in the county's election system during a major software update and, therefore, were barred from supervising the November election. Peters said she would appeal, but on October 21, the Colorado Supreme Court declined to take up her appeal.

On November 9, Mesa County Election Director Brandi Bantz fired Sandra Brown, who said she would file a lawsuit against the county for improper termination. On the evening of November 16, 2021, law enforcement authorities executed search warrants on the homes of Peters, Sherronna Bishop, and two others as part of the criminal investigation. Peters claimed on TV that the agents had broken down the door of one residence with a battering ram, but they denied this. No arrests were made.

On February 7, 2022, during a hearing for Knisley, Peters was seen video recording the proceedings on her iPad. She was charged with contempt of court, though this charge was later overturned on appeal. When investigators tried the following day to execute a search warrant to seize her iPad with the video footage, Peters tried to hide the iPad and repeatedly said that she could not provide the password to the iPad because it belonged not to her but to a "Tammy Bailey". She was additionally charged with obstructing government operations and obstructing a peace officer.

=== Indictment, trial and conviction ===
Peters was indicted on March 9, 2022, on 13 counts: three counts of attempting to influence a public servant (class 4 felonies), two counts of conspiracy to commit attempting to influence a public servant (class 5 felonies), first-degree official misconduct (a class 2 misdemeanor), violation of duty (a misdemeanor), failing to comply with the secretary of state (a misdemeanor), obstruction, contempt of court, criminal impersonation, and identity theft of Gerald Wood. She was reported to have "sought to prove that widespread fraud had occurred in the state's 2020 presidential election", Knisley was indicted alongside Peters, on six counts: attempt to influence a public servant, conspiracy to commit criminal impersonation, violation of duty, and failure to comply with the requirements of the Secretary of State.

Despite having acknowledged in earlier court appearances that a non-employee had been present, she claimed that Gerald Wood had perjured himself on the stand when he denied being at the unauthorized breach. Conan Hayes admitted to using Wood's badge, and Patrick M. Byrne told The New York Times that Hayes was on his payroll and had used FaceTime with him from inside Mesa County election offices saying a government official invited him to make backup copies of machines. Byrne told the Times he could see Hayes was wearing "someone else's" identification badge. Peters was barred from supervising local elections in 2022 as well.

Three ethics complaints have also been filed against Peters. On August 16, 2021, she was alleged to have accepted plane rides and other gifts from Mike Lindell in excess of the state gift limit of $65. In April 2022, at an appearance with Peters, Lindell disclosed having personally donated an amount in the $200,000 to $800,000 range to her legal defense fund and campaign. As this was also in apparent violation of the $65 state limit, the Colorado ethics commission approved a second ethics complaint that had been made in January 2022 and investigated Peters' elections fund. Peters denied prior knowledge, despite previously directing supporters to Lindell's legal defense fund. On May 17, 2022, the commission found a third ethics complaint filed on May 9 non-frivolous. This complaint was based on Lindell's comments at an "Election Truth Rally" and alleged that Peters knew of these payments, as evidenced by recorded comments she made at the rally.

In July 2022, a warrant was issued for Peters' arrest after she traveled out of state without the required court permission to appear at another Lindell event in Las Vegas. Peters claimed not to know of the restriction, her three attorneys claimed not to have told her, and the arrest order was canceled; but later the same month, a second warrant for her arrest was issued because she emailed multiple county clerk's offices informing them that she was seeking a recount with hand counting, violating the bond conditions of her arrest for election machine tampering. Peters turned herself in, was arrested, was allowed to repost bond, and was again released. County Elections Manager Sandra Brown also turned herself in for arrest on July 11, 2022, on an affidavit naming her in a conspiracy to commit criminal impersonation and attempt to influence a public servant. She was released from custody after posting a personal recognizance bond.

Peters claimed in a July 29 press release that El Paso County's logic and accuracy test (LAT) failed "in a spectacular fashion, with over a 50% error rate out of the 4,000+ ballots tested". The release also claimed that "Griswold did not provide reasonable advance notice of the LAT to the Tina Peters Campaign, thereby denying them their right to have an [sic] appointed watchers present during the test," however, the Colorado Springs Gazette showed representatives for Peters' campaign present at the test. Peters filed suit challenging methods used in the recount, and on August 6, 2022, that suit was dismissed.

On August 7, 2022, Peters pled not guilty to all charges related to the alleged election machine tampering, and a trial was set for March 2023. On August 20, 2022, Peters and Sherronna Bishop appeared in a documentary released by Mike Lindell titled "[S]election Code" [sic]. On August 25, 2022, Knisley pled guilty to three misdemeanor counts of trespass, official misconduct, and violation of duty, having cut a plea deal with prosecutors to keep her out of prison in exchange for testifying against Peters and others in the case. Court documents say Knisley admitted she knew about and participated in a "scheme with Tina Peters and other identified people to deceive public servants from both the Colorado Secretary of State's Office and Mesa County". The document continues to state, "This scheme, which was significantly directed by Tina Peters, ultimately permitted an unauthorized individual to gain access to secure areas inside the Mesa County Clerk and Recorder's Office so that this person—fraudulently held out to be improperly titled as Gerald Wood, but who was later identified to actually be Conan Hayes—could participate in Mesa County's trusted build with Tina Peters and Sandra Brown."

On November 30, 2022, Sandra Brown pled guilty to attempting to influence a public servant, a felony, and official misconduct, a misdemeanor, as part of a plea agreement that required her to testify against Tina Peters and her performance on the witness stand would play a factor in her eventual sentencing. Brown's deal, which 21st Judicial District Judge Matthew Barrett did not decide whether to accept until sentencing, would require her to serve up to 30 days in jail for the misdemeanor, and would erase the felony conviction after two years if she complied with his conditions, such as requiring community service, for those two years. "There were things going on that I should have questioned and I didn't", Brown told Judge Barrett.

In March 2023, Peters received a Mesa County jury trial for charges related to her recording the court proceedings of Knisley with an iPad and for obstructing investigators who tried to execute a search warrant to seize her iPad with the video footage the next day. During the trial, testimony and statements from Peters' attorney revealed that Tammy Bailey was an alias that Peters had created for herself; during the time of the search warrant, Peters had repeatedly told investigators that the iPad did not belong to her and that she could not provide the password because it belonged to someone else named Tammy Bailey. The jury ultimately convicted her on a misdemeanor charge of obstruction of government operations but acquitted her on the charge that she obstructed a peace officer. The court sentenced Peters to four months of house arrest for this misdemeanor, during which she was ordered to wear an ankle monitor, fined $786.35, and ordered to perform 120 hours of community service, which she planned to appeal. Sandra Brown began her 30-day sentence for the misdemeanor of official misconduct. Brown's deal would expunge her felony conviction of attempting to influence a public servant after two years if she complied with Judge Barrett's conditions.

On May 5, 2023, Peters was held in contempt of court for lying to Judge Barrett about recording court proceedings involving Knisley using her iPad on February 7, 2022. Eagle County District Judge Paul Dunkelman gave Peters a fine of $1,500. On September 6, 2023, Peters pleaded not guilty to three counts of attempting to influence a public servant (felony), conspiracy to commit trying to influence a public servant (felony), criminal impersonation (felony), two counts of conspiracy to commit criminal impersonation (felony), identity theft (felony), first-degree official misconduct (misdemeanor), violation of duty (misdemeanor), and failing to comply with the secretary of state (misdemeanor). Her trial was pushed back to February 9, 2024, with the jury selection process to take place on the two preceding days.

On July 19, 2023, Tina Peters fired her attorney, Harvey Steinberg, and hired new attorneys, Douglas Richards and Madalia Maalik. They requested to push the trial to October 18–30, 2023. On November 13, 2023, Peters filed a lawsuit in the U.S. District Court in Denver, Colorado against the United States, U.S. Attorney General Merrick Garland, 21st Judicial District Court Attorney Daniel Rubinstein, and Colorado Secretary of State Jena Griswold. The suit alleged that these government officials violated her constitutional rights by retaliating with investigations and charges against her for her alleged misconduct as an election official when she raised election integrity concerns in the 2020 General Election.

In February 2024, Peters was scheduled to go to court for her criminal case but had fired her attorneys again, claiming to have COVID-19. Attorney Michael Edminister took over the case from Douglas Richards and other attorneys in the Richards Carrington law firm, making him the fifth attorney of record and the fourth time her case has been postponed. The trial was again delayed until the July and August 2024. Peters attempted to have the charges against her dismissed several times. U.S. District Court Judge Nina Y. Wang dismissed Peters' motion to dismiss the criminal investigation citing a failure to state a claim, a lack of standing, and a lack of jurisdiction to dismiss the case. The 10th Circuit Court of Appeals denied her appeal of that decision, with a unanimous 3–0 ruling affirming the lower court's decision. Then, the Associate Justice of the Supreme Court of the United States Neil Gorsuch denied Peters' application for an injunction to dismiss or halt a criminal trial against her. The trial then proceeded.

=== Conviction and sentencing ===
Peters was convicted in August 2024 on seven of ten charges of engaging in a security breach to advance a false conspiracy theory of election fraud. Four of the convictions were for felonies. On the day after her conviction, she appeared on the Steve Bannon War Room podcast to insist she would continue to pursue her allegations, referring to a debunked theory originating from former Michigan politician Patrick Colbeck and amplified on Twitter by Rasmussen Reports alleging Dominion engineers based in Serbia could change votes over the internet.

Peters was sentenced to nine years in prison and immediately taken into custody in October 2024. At her sentencing, District Court Judge Matthew Barrett told Peters, "Your lies are well documented ... I'm convinced you'd do it all over again if you could. ... You are no hero. You're a charlatan who used, and is still using, your prior position in office to peddle a snake oil that's been proven to be junk time and time again." In response, Peters denied breaking the law "with malice". Subsequent to the sentencing the courthouse increased security after receiving threats to the judge and staff. On February 7, 2025, Peters filed a federal habeas corpus petition in U.S. District Court of Colorado, arguing that she should be released on bond pending the appeal decision. Peters asked the court to appear at the hearing remotely from jail in Pueblo, but the judge denied the request. Her petition for release pending appeal was denied by Chief U.S. Magistrate Judge Scott T. Varholak on December 8, 2025.

In May 2025, President Donald Trump directed the U.S. Department of Justice to take actions to secure Peters' release. In August 2025, Trump issued a social media statement warning that "harsh measures" would be imposed on Colorado if Peters was not released. On November 12, the Colorado Department of Corrections received a letter from the Federal Bureau of Prisons asking to move Peters to federal custody, a request denied by state prison officials and Colorado Governor Jared Polis. On December 11, Trump said he had pardoned Peters, despite having no jurisdiction over convictions under state law. Colorado officials rejected the pardon for lack of jurisdiction. On December 23, Peters asked the state appeals court to recognize the federal pardon. On December 31, Trump posted to social media that the governor was a "Scumbag" and the district attorney was "disgusting". He said: "I wish them only the worst. May they rot in Hell."

As of December 2025, Peters was housed at La Vista Correctional Facility in Pueblo, Colorado. Her initial parole eligibility date was set at December 20, 2028. In January 2026, a representative for Peters alleged that she was attacked by another inmate inside a maintenance closet, that she had been placed in solitary confinement, and that she would be charged with felony assault. The Independent reported that surveillance footage showed that Peters "emerges from the doorway and appears to wrap her hands around the inmate's neck". The Colorado Department of Corrections responded that no one was injured and that Peters was simply moved to a different housing area.

Under pressure from Trump, Polis suggested that Peters' sentence was too severe for a first-time offender. Democrats in Congress in Washington, D.C. expressed concern that granting her clemency (as Polis suggested he might do) would lend credence to Trump's false claims of election fraud. On April 2, 2026, a Colorado appeals court in a 3–0 ruling upheld Peters's conviction and did not release her from prison, but it threw out her prison sentence and asked the trial court to resentence her. The appellate judges noted that Peters "is no longer the Mesa County Clerk and Recorder" and thus the sentence would not serve to deter future crimes, and they found that the trial judge had violated her free speech rights by calling her a "charlatan" and a "snake oil saleswoman". The appellate judges also rejected Trump's pardon attempt saying “the President’s pardon does not reach Peters’s state offenses”.

=== Commutation and release ===
On May 15, 2026, despite the ongoing resentencing process, Governor Jared Polis granted Peters' application for commutation granting her release on June 1, 2026, subject to conditions to be set by the Parole Board of Colorado. After the announcement, U.S. President Donald Trump posted "FREE TINA" on Truth Social, while Republican Mesa County District Attorney Dan Rubinstein, who obtained the conviction of Peters, condemned the decision, stating that "the Governor chose to substitute his judgment for the courts, the sentencing judge, and the Mesa County community that bore the consequences of Ms. Peters' actions. It is especially troubling that notoriety, political pressure and powerful allies appear to have produced special treatment that ordinary defendants would never receive."

Polis's decision was likewise condemned by Colorado Attorney General Phil Weiser, who described the commutation as "mind-boggling and wrong as a matter of basic justice", as well as Colorado Secretary of State Jena Griswold, who stated that Polis's actions "will validate and embolden the election denial movement, and leave a dark, dangerous imprint on American democracy for years to come". Moreover, all 66 Democrats in the Colorado General Assembly had signed a letter urging Polis not to grant clemency to Peters in March 2026, two months prior to the announcement.

On May 20, the Colorado Democratic Party censured Polis at a state committee meeting. Peters was released from prison on June 1, 2026, having served less than a quarter of her nine-year sentence. Following her release, Peters claimed without evidence that Democrats would cheat in the 2026 United States elections. On October 5, 2026, Peters met with President Trump in the Oval Office to propose a plan to "seize ballots." During the previous week, Peters' lawyer Peter Ticktin had told conservative podcaster Joel Oltmann that "her [Peters'] idea is grab, get control over the ballots as soon as the machines spit them through and then do a recount," adding that, if Trump believes the elections are rigged, he "is not going to relinquish control again" and "It's better if we're going to have a civil war of any sort that it be martial law with our side in control of the armaments."

== Personal life ==
Prior to being taken into custody in October 2024, Peters lived in Grand Junction, Colorado. She and her husband, Thomas Peters, had a daughter and a son. Their son, Remington Jordan Peters, a combat veteran serving as a United States Navy SEAL, died on May 29, 2017, at age 27 in a parachute accident performing at an air show in New York City.

Peters legally separated from her husband in June 2017 and filed a decree of legal separation in January 2018. At the time, she had power of attorney over her husband's affairs for health reasons. The couple officially divorced in November 2021. On October 2, 2021, Tina Peters filed a quitclaim deed for a home that Thomas Peters had purchased separately eight months after the couple separated. A civil complaint filed by Thomas Peters, which later included his sister, Katherine Egan, alleged that Tina Peters filed the quitclaim deed "through deceit and deception". Thomas Peters' daughter Cayce joined Egan as a plaintiff in a civil suit against Tina Peters on behalf of the estate of her father as his personal representative, alleging the quitclaim deed was filed, placing the house in her own name, on the same day her power of attorney over Thomas Peters was rescinded. Thomas Peters died on December 31, 2023.

== See also ==
- List of people granted executive clemency in the second Trump presidency
