= Colorado Department of Corrections =

State agency that operates Colorado's prisons

- Abbreviation: CDOC

Agency overview
- Formed: 1977
- Annual budget: US$1.2 billion (FY2024–25)

Jurisdictional structure
- Operations jurisdiction: Colorado, USA
- Map of Colorado Department of Corrections's jurisdiction
- Population: ≈17,900 incarcerated (2025), plus parolees
- Legal jurisdiction: State of Colorado
- Governing body: Colorado General Assembly
- Constituting instrument: C.R.S. Title 17
- General nature: Local civilian police

Operational structure
- Headquarters: 1250 Academy Park Loop, Colorado Springs
- Agency executive: Moses "Andre" Stancil, Executive Director
- Parent agency: Government of Colorado
- Divisions: Prisons; Adult Parole, Community Corrections and YOS; Clinical and Correctional Services; Administration

Website
- cdoc.colorado.gov

The Colorado Department of Corrections (CDOC) is the principal department of the government of Colorado responsible for the custody, control, and rehabilitation of adults convicted of felonies in the state's courts. Established as a cabinet-level department in 1977, it operates the state prison system, supervises offenders released on parole, and coordinates the placement of offenders in community corrections programs. The department is headquartered in Colorado Springs.

CDOC operates 19 state-run correctional facilities and contracts with the private operator CoreCivic for two additional prisons, for a total of 21 facilities, and supervises parolees through a statewide parole division. As of 2025 the system held roughly 17,900 inmates and supervised several thousand parolees. The agency is led by an Executive Director appointed by the Governor of Colorado; Moses "Andre" Stancil has served in the role since 2023.

Since the late 2010s the department has been shaped by two competing pressures. A series of sentencing and parole reforms reduced the prison population from its 2010 peak and lowered the state's recidivism rate, while a 2018 law (House Bill 18-1410) created statutory "population management" measures that take effect when prisons approach capacity. Beginning in 2025, however, rising admissions, driven largely by parolees returned for technical violations, pushed the system back to capacity, triggering those measures and prompting new legislation in 2026. The department has also been the subject of significant litigation, including a February 2026 ruling that its inmate labor practices violated the Colorado Constitution.

== History ==
=== Territorial penitentiary and early years ===
Colorado's state prison system traces its origins to the Colorado Territorial Penitentiary at Cañon City, authorized by the territorial legislature in 1868 and opened in 1871, while Colorado was still a territory. Known locally as "Old Max," the prison was built in part by convict labor using stone quarried on site. When Colorado attained statehood in 1876, the federal penitentiary was deeded to the new state and became the Colorado State Penitentiary, the nucleus of a cluster of correctional institutions that made Fremont County the center of the state's prison system.

On October 3–4, 1929, the penitentiary was the scene of the deadliest prison riot in Colorado history. Thirteen people died: eight prison guards and five convicts. Large sections of the prison were destroyed by fire before the uprising's ringleaders took their own lives. From the 1890s until the 1990s the prison also held the state's death row and execution chamber.

=== Creation of the Department of Corrections ===
For most of the institution's first century, the warden of the state penitentiary exercised broad authority over the prison. Beginning in the 1970s, federal court decisions arising from inmate lawsuits increasingly constrained prison administration, and in 1977 the Colorado General Assembly created the Department of Corrections as a separate cabinet department to administer the growing system of state prisons.

=== Growth and sentencing policy (1980s–1990s) ===
Colorado's prison population grew rapidly in the 1980s and 1990s, rising from roughly 3,400 in the mid-1980s to more than 7,600 by 1990 and continuing upward thereafter. The growth coincided with a shift from indeterminate to determinate sentencing and with tougher penalties for violent and drug offenses. The state responded with a major prison construction program, opening the Arkansas Valley Correctional Facility in 1987, the Colorado State Penitentiary in 1993, and the Sterling Correctional Facility, the system's largest, in 1999. The building program also produced the 948-bed Centennial Correctional Facility–South, a $208 million prison near Cañon City designed almost entirely for solitary confinement; it opened in 2010 but was mothballed two years later without ever housing inmates, a project critics labeled a "boondoggle" that left taxpayers carrying the construction debt on an empty building until it was pressed back into service in 2020.

=== Reform era and population decline (2000s–2010s) ===
After peaking near 23,000 inmates around 2009–2010, the prison population began a sustained decline. A series of measures (House Bill 11-1276 and Senate Bill 11-176 in 2011, Senate Bill 15-124 in 2015, and Senate Bill 19-143 in 2019) reduced sentences for some nonviolent offenses, expanded earned time credits, and limited the return of parolees to prison for technical violations. Over the same period the department overhauled its use of long-term solitary confinement: under directors Tom Clements and Rick Raemisch, CDOC implemented "step-down" programs and mental health units that sharply reduced the number of inmates in administrative segregation and, by 2017, effectively ended prolonged indeterminate solitary confinement. In March 2013, Clements was assassinated at his home by a parolee, Evan Ebel, a member of the 211 Crew white supremacist prison gang, an event that drew national attention to the agency. Clements's successor, Rick Raemisch, further publicized the reforms in 2014 by spending about 20 hours confined in a segregation cell and writing about the experience.

=== Recent developments (2019–2026) ===
In 2019 the legislature restricted the state's use of for-profit prisons, and Colorado abolished the death penalty in 2020. During the COVID-19 pandemic the department expanded early releases for some low-risk inmates, contributing to a temporary population dip before admissions rebounded. In 2024 a court-approved consent decree required CDOC to expand health care and housing options for transgender women in its custody.

By 2025 the system had returned to capacity, activating the statutory population management measures and reigniting debate over prison construction and sentencing policy. In February 2026 a Denver judge ruled that the department's practice of disciplining inmates who refused to work violated the state constitution's prohibition on involuntary servitude, and in May 2026 Governor Jared Polis signed legislation creating an overcrowding working group, increasing earned time credits, and authorizing additional prison beds.

== Organization and leadership ==
The Executive Director of the Colorado Department of Corrections is appointed by the Governor and directs the agency's operations, budget, and policy. Moses "Andre" Stancil was named interim director in November 2022 and appointed permanent Executive Director on January 31, 2023. Stancil had previously worked as a CDOC correctional officer, served as a warden in the Federal Bureau of Prisons, and returned to CDOC as deputy executive director in 2022. He succeeded Dean Williams, whom Governor Polis appointed in January 2019 and who led the department until December 2022. Williams, who had previously served as Alaska's commissioner of corrections (a post from which that state's governor removed him), became a prominent and at times controversial advocate of a "normalization" philosophy that sought to make prison conditions more closely resemble life outside. The senior leadership team includes Deputy Executive Director of Operations Melissa Smith, a 25-year CDOC veteran who oversees facility operations and education programs, and Kito Bess, who became head of the Division of Adult Parole in October 2025. Other members of the leadership team include:

- Jessica Sapp, Deputy Director of the Division of Adult Parole (appointed 2026)
- Jessica Bertolas, Assistant Director of Transitional Services
- John Bogner, Assistant Director of Southern and Western Operations
- John Cribari, Assistant Director of Administrative Services
- Andrew Zavaras, Assistant Director of Denver Metro and Northern Operations

The department is organized into divisions overseen by the Executive Director and deputy directors. The Division of Prisons manages facility operations, inmate housing, classification, and security. The Division of Adult Parole, Community Corrections and the Youthful Offender System supervises parolees through field offices statewide, coordinates community corrections referrals, and operates the Youthful Offender System for younger offenders. Clinical and Correctional Services provides medical, dental, and behavioral health care and administers education, vocational, and rehabilitative programming, while administrative divisions handle finance, human resources, and the Office of the Inspector General, which investigates misconduct and security threats.

=== Office of the Inspector General ===
The Office of the Inspector General (OIG) is the department's internal criminal investigation unit. Created by the General Assembly in 1999 (House Bill 99-1317, codified at C.R.S. § 17-1-103.8), it is charged with investigating crimes originating within the department, staff misconduct and corruption, and contraband schemes, and it conducts pre-employment background investigations of job applicants; its investigators are certified peace officers and refer cases to local district attorneys for prosecution. The office also serves as the designated channel for prisoners to report sexual assault under the Prison Rape Elimination Act. A 2023 law (Senate Bill 23-203) added the apprehension of fugitives who abscond from correctional facilities to the office's duties and requires the department to report annually to the legislature's judiciary committees on that work.

Unlike inspectors general in many other states, the CDOC inspector general is appointed by, and reports directly to, the executive director of the agency it investigates, a structure critics have argued undermines its independence. The issue surfaced in litigation brought by Angel Medina, a warden at the Cañon City complex, who alleged he was retaliated against after staff reported to the OIG that truckloads of county electronic waste had been dumped on prison grounds in 2017; state hazardous waste inspectors found the dumping violated solid-waste law, and cleanup cost taxpayers more than $100,000. Medina's suit alleged that executive director Rick Raemisch's office suppressed the ensuing investigation. The state paid Medina $406,000 in 2021 to settle his claims. The office's own personnel have also faced scrutiny: in 2023, an OIG investigator was charged with felony forgery for allegedly altering a law enforcement report.

== Facilities ==
CDOC facilities are rated on a five-level security scale established by statute, from Level I (minimum) through Level V (administrative maximum). Many of the prisons are located in rural southern and eastern Colorado; six are clustered in Fremont County around Cañon City. Reported capacities are operational design figures and fluctuate with budget and staffing decisions.

=== State-run prisons ===
CDOC state-operated correctional facilities
Facility	Location	Security level	Approx. capacity
Arkansas Valley Correctional Facility	Ordway	III (medium)	1,029
Arrowhead Correctional Center	Cañon City	II	520
Buena Vista Correctional Facility	Buena Vista	III	1,034
Centennial Correctional Facility	Cañon City	V (maximum)	936
Colorado State Penitentiary	Cañon City	V (maximum)	725
Colorado Territorial Correctional Facility	Cañon City	III	921
Delta Correctional Center	Delta	I (minimum)	381
Denver Reception and Diagnostic Center	Denver	Intake/classification	570
Denver Women's Correctional Facility	Denver	Women's (mixed)	768
Four Mile Correctional Center	Cañon City	II	521
Fremont Correctional Facility	Cañon City	III	1,601
La Vista Correctional Facility	Pueblo	III (women's)	570
Limon Correctional Facility	Limon	IV (close)	938
Rifle Correctional Center	Rifle	I (minimum)	192
San Carlos Correctional Facility	Pueblo	V (mental health)	255
Skyline Correctional Center	Cañon City	I (minimum)	126
Sterling Correctional Facility	Sterling	V (maximum)	2,320
Trinidad Correctional Facility	Model	II	500
Youthful Offender System	Pueblo	Specialized (ages 14–24 at sentencing)	

=== Private (contracted) prisons ===
CDOC contracts with CoreCivic for two Level III (medium-security) prisons that house state inmates under departmental oversight; a Private Prisons Monitoring Unit audits the facilities for compliance with state standards.

- Bent County Correctional Facility (Las Animas), opened 1993, operated by CoreCivic since 1996; approx. 1,400 beds.
- Crowley County Correctional Facility (Olney Springs), operated by CoreCivic since 1998; approx. 1,500 beds.

The Crowley County facility was the site of major riots in 1999 and on July 20, 2004, the latter involving inmates from Colorado, Washington, and Wyoming. On the evening of June 6, 2026, an incident at the Bent County facility left two inmates dead and a third hospitalized, with no staff injured; the Bent County coroner identified the men who died as Charles Gates, 27, and Michael Fisher, 59, though officials declined to disclose the cause, citing an ongoing investigation. The department placed the prison on lockdown and suspended visitation at all state facilities, restoring it on June 8 everywhere except Bent County while its Office of the Inspector General investigated.

=== Community corrections ===
Offenders nearing parole eligibility may be referred to residential community corrections ("halfway house") programs as a transitional step. The roughly 30 such programs statewide are administered by local community corrections boards and the Office of Community Corrections within the Colorado Division of Criminal Justice, rather than by CDOC directly, though CDOC coordinates referrals for its population. Walkaways from these halfway houses occur periodically, such as the February 2026 escape of Richard Capek from a Pueblo program.

=== Closed facilities ===
The department has closed or ended contracts at several facilities since 2010, largely in response to the declining prison population:

- Fort Lyon Correctional Facility (Bent County): state-run, closed 2011; later converted to supportive housing.
- High Plains Correctional Facility (Brush): private women's facility, closed 2010.
- Huerfano County Correctional Center (Walsenburg): CoreCivic, closed 2010.
- Kit Carson Correctional Center (Burlington): CoreCivic, closed 2016.
- Cheyenne Mountain Re-Entry Center (Colorado Springs): GEO Group, closed 2020.
- Other former or affiliated sites include the Colorado Correctional Center (Camp George West, Golden) and Hudson Correctional Facility (Hudson).

== Operations ==
=== Intake and classification ===
Newly sentenced male inmates enter the system at the Denver Reception and Diagnostic Center (DRDC), where they undergo medical and mental health screening, orientation, and classification before transfer to a permanent facility; women are processed at the Denver Women's Correctional Facility. Classification assigns each inmate a custody level based on factors such as criminal history, offense severity, and institutional conduct, and inmates are periodically reclassified.

=== Security threat groups ===
The department tracks "security threat groups," its term for the prison and street gangs, cartels, and other organizations active in the system, identifying members through tattoos, monitored correspondence, and intelligence work. Groups represented among Colorado prisoners include the Sureños and Norteños, the Bloods and Crips and their local subsets, and the 211 Crew, a white supremacist prison gang founded in 1995 at the Denver County Jail. The 211 Crew drew national notice in 2013 when one of its parolee members, Evan Ebel, murdered executive director Tom Clements.

=== Capital punishment ===
Until Colorado abolished the death penalty in 2020, death row inmates were held under the state's highest custody designation. From the 1890s to the 1990s, death row and the execution chamber were located at the Colorado Territorial Correctional Facility; the execution chamber later moved to the Colorado State Penitentiary, and death row inmates were ultimately housed at the Sterling Correctional Facility. In 2011 the state relocated its death row prisoners to settle a federal lawsuit brought by inmate Nathan Dunlap over the lack of outdoor exercise. Governor Polis commuted the sentences of the three remaining death row inmates when he signed the repeal in March 2020.

=== Health care ===
The department provides medical, dental, and behavioral health services through a combination of state employees and contractors, including chronic care management, infirmary and emergency care, and residential treatment programs for serious mental illness. Persistent vacancies among clinical staff, around 30 percent of positions as of late 2024, have contributed to treatment delays and increased reliance on contract providers.

=== Programs and recidivism ===
CDOC offers cognitive-behavioral programs, academic education (including high school equivalency and, through partner colleges, postsecondary courses), and vocational training, the last partly through Colorado Correctional Industries. For three decades the department also ran a Wild Horse Inmate Program at the East Cañon City prison complex, in which inmates gentled Bureau of Land Management mustangs for adoption, until the BLM ended the contract in 2025 over rising costs. The department reports its progress in part through recidivism rates, measured as returns to prison after release. Colorado's three-year recidivism rate fell substantially between the late 2000s and the early 2020s (by roughly 40 percent from 2008 to 2019, one of the larger declines among U.S. states) and stood near 28 percent in recent reporting. A 2024–2025 working group revised the state's official definition of recidivism under Senate Bill 24-030, effective July 1, 2025.

Analysts disagree about how to interpret these trends. A 2025 analysis by the Common Sense Institute, a conservative free enterprise think tank, argued that reduced incarceration over the previous decade had coincided with rising violent crime and questioned the trade-offs of decarceration; the report's causal conclusions are contested by criminal justice reform advocates, who attribute crime trends to broader factors and point to falling recidivism and arrest rates.

=== Emergencies ===
Because many CDOC prisons sit in rural, wildfire-prone areas, the department maintains evacuation plans for natural hazards. In August 2025 it evacuated all 179 inmates from the minimum-security Rifle Correctional Center as the Lee Fire approached, moving them to other secure facilities without injury. A month earlier, a small fire in a housing unit at the Denver Women's Correctional Facility sent two inmates and a staff member to a hospital for smoke exposure.

=== Notable inmates ===
Tina Peters, the former Mesa County clerk convicted in 2024 over a 2021 breach of county election systems, served part of a nine-year sentence at the La Vista Correctional Facility. Her prosecution drew national attention, and on June 1, 2026, she was released on parole after Governor Polis commuted her sentence to four and a half years.

== Parole and community supervision ==
Release decisions are made by the Colorado State Board of Parole, a panel of members appointed by the Governor and confirmed by the Senate, which evaluates inmates' suitability for release using risk assessments and statutory criteria under C.R.S. § 17-22.5-404. Once released, parolees are supervised by CDOC's Division of Adult Parole, with higher-risk offenders subject to an Intensive Supervision Program that imposes smaller caseloads and more frequent contacts.

Since 2015, Colorado law has emphasized graduated, intermediate sanctions rather than reimprisonment for technical violations, such as missing appointments or failing drug tests. Senate Bill 15-124 (2015) and subsequent measures limited revocations for such violations, and the number of technical violation returns declined markedly over the following years. Nonetheless, a renewed increase in technical-violation admissions was a principal driver of the prison crowding that emerged in 2025.

=== Risk assessments and supervision failures ===
The most consequential supervision failure in the department's history surrounded the March 2013 murder of Executive Director Tom Clements by parolee Evan Ebel. Ebel had been released from prison roughly four years early because a sentencing judge's clerical error recorded a sentence for assaulting a correctional officer as concurrent rather than consecutive. After his release, Ebel cut off his ankle monitor and remained at large for six days before parole officials obtained an arrest warrant; during that window he killed pizza delivery driver Nathan Leon and Clements. A Denver Post investigation found that the division's 212 parole officers had been deluged with nearly 90,000 electronic-monitoring alerts over six months, so that serious tamper alerts went unheeded amid thousands of minor or false notifications. The fallout led to a federal audit of the parole division, new requirements that officers respond in person within hours of a tamper alert, and a proposed fugitive-apprehension unit.

In 2025, an investigation by the Denver television station 9News found pervasive errors in the actuarial risk assessments CDOC uses to gauge the danger posed by its roughly 8,000 parolees; an internal review identified mistakes in about 98 percent of the assessments examined, and the department agreed to re-examine more than 1,700 of them. After the reporting, CDOC restricted public access to the assessment records, citing copyright, a move criticized by state legislators, and Executive Director Stancil and his staff declined for months to answer questions about the problems.

The supervision system also failed in the case of parolee Christopher Moore. After Moore was arrested for vehicle theft in June 2025, days after his release, CDOC did not place a parole hold because the arrest was not properly entered in law enforcement databases, and his revocation was not begun for about four months. In October 2025, Moore fled police in a high-speed chase that killed an uninvolved motorist, Steven Ainsworth, as well as Moore himself; the department called the delay "unacceptable and a failure" and opened an internal review.

== Prison population and overcrowding ==
House Bill 18-1410, enacted in 2018, requires CDOC to track the prison bed vacancy rate monthly and to activate "prison population management measures" when the rate falls below a statutory threshold for 30 consecutive days. The trigger was set at 2 percent in 2018 and raised to 3 percent by Senate Bill 19-143 in 2019; the measures expedite parole review for inmates already eligible for release rather than mandating releases.

The vacancy rate fell below the threshold in August 2025, and Governor Polis activated the management plan the following month, with the system operating at well over 97 percent of capacity. Reporting attributed the crowding to a roughly 20 percent rise in admissions for technical parole violations, the elimination of about 300 beds amid a budget shortfall, and a shortage of community corrections placements and parole officers that left thousands of inmates already approved for parole still incarcerated. County jails reported hundreds of people awaiting transfer to state prison, exceeding the state's budgeted holding capacity. In July 2025, El Paso County Sheriff Joseph Roybal and 16 other county sheriffs urged Governor Polis to address the transfer backlog, noting that the state's reimbursement of $77.16 per inmate per day fell well below the counties' actual cost of holding state prisoners. Analysts and a January 2026 review concluded that the 2018 law had made little difference to the vacancy rate, in part because community corrections boards control bed placements and the law excludes many offenses.

In response, lawmakers approved limited bed expansions, including a September 2025 appropriation for additional beds, and in the 2026–27 budget authorized the department to add 941 beds for male inmates and to contract for beds at previously closed private prisons rather than build new facilities. In May 2026, Polis signed Senate Bill 159, which established a working group on overcrowding, raised the vacancy threshold that triggers intervention, and increased earned time credits (to 14 days per month for lower-level offenders and 12 for others, plus up to 150 days for completing behavioral health programming).

== Workforce ==
=== Staffing shortages ===
As one of the state's largest agencies, CDOC has faced persistent shortages of correctional officers and clinical staff. The state directed more than $192 million over two years toward closing the gap, and the department offered signing and retention bonuses and housing stipends at hard-to-staff facilities such as Sterling, Limon, and Buena Vista, but hiring lagged behind a growing population. A 2024 advocacy report and the department's own data documented heavy reliance on overtime (estimated overtime expenses exceeded $40 million in fiscal year 2024–25), along with reductions in program access during staffing-related lockdowns, including case managers and teachers reassigned to security posts. A 2025 third-party audit found the department's staffing formula outdated, contributing to tens of millions of dollars in unbudgeted expenses. Staff and the Colorado WINS union linked the resulting mandatory overtime to fatigue-related harm, including the February 2022 death of Limon correctional officer Matthew Beauman, who fell asleep driving home after an overnight shift; the union counted three CDOC employee vehicle crashes that year, two of them fatal.

=== Recruitment from Puerto Rico ===
To fill vacancies, CDOC recruited dozens of correctional officers from Puerto Rico beginning in 2023, housing many of them in cubicles on prison grounds for a monthly fee. Some recruits, most of them at the Buena Vista Correctional Complex, alleged discrimination, including being told not to speak Spanish and being searched more often than the inmates they guarded. A 2023 internal investigation by the Office of the Inspector General concluded the discrimination claims were unsubstantiated, attributing many to miscommunication, and the department stopped making unannounced inspections of the workers' quarters.

=== Deaths in the line of duty ===
According to the Officer Down Memorial Page, more than a dozen CDOC staff have died in the line of duty since the 19th century, including the eight guards killed in the 1929 penitentiary riot, Correctional Sergeant Eric Autobee, who was killed by an inmate at the Limon Correctional Facility in 2002, Sergeant Mary Ricard, who was stabbed to death by an inmate in the kitchen of the Arkansas Valley Correctional Facility in 2012, and Executive Director Tom Clements, who was murdered in 2013. The department maintains a Fallen Officer Memorial and observes annual tributes to staff who have died on duty.

== Budget and oversight ==
For fiscal year 2024–25, CDOC's budget totaled approximately $1.2 billion, the large majority from the state general fund. Under House Bill 24-1462, the state engaged a third party to evaluate the department's budgeting practices; the resulting 2025 audit found that CDOC's budget requests had been "inaccurate, incomplete, and inconsistent," that it had inflated some operational costs, and that its outdated staffing formula and cash-fund management needed reform, and it recommended more than three dozen changes. Legislative budget analysts also found that the department had covered unbudgeted contract clinical staffing by drawing on vacancy savings and centrally appropriated compensation funds without clearly identifying which appropriations it used, obscuring the true cost of its persistent clinical vacancies; the outdated staffing formula alone produced about $29 million in unbudgeted spending in 2024.

== Controversies and litigation ==
Since the early 2000s the department has paid or committed well over $50 million to resolve lawsuits over conditions of confinement, medical care, discrimination, and employment practices, in addition to court orders requiring changes to its operations. Notable settlements and judgments include:

Notable settlements and judgments involving CDOC
Year	Case or claimant	Issue	Outcome
2003	Montez v. Romer	Disability access (ADA class action)	More than $3 million in accessibility renovations plus $252,300 in awards, fees and costs
2014	Estate of Christopher Lopez	Death in a restraint chair	$3 million
2016	Decoteau v. Raemisch	Outdoor exercise for segregated inmates	Injunctive relief: outdoor recreation yards and guaranteed yard access
2018	Aragon v. Raemisch	Hepatitis C treatment	Commitment of $41 million over two years to treat infected prisoners
2019	Lindsay Saunders-Velez	Safety of a transgender inmate in a men's prison	$170,000
2020	ACLU COVID-19 class action	Protection of medically vulnerable prisoners during the pandemic	Injunctive relief: independent expert, single-cell offers, copay waivers
2021	Angel Medina	Warden's whistleblower-retaliation claims	$406,000
2022	Ruiz v. Colorado Department of Corrections	On-call overtime for parole officers	Approximately $5 million
2022	Deaf and hard-of-hearing prisoners	ADA accommodations	Injunctive relief: interpreters, visual alerts; monitoring team added in 2025
2024	Jason Brooks	ADA accommodation (missed meals)	$3.5 million jury verdict, upheld on appeal
2023	Christopher Tanner	Medical neglect resulting in amputations	$8 million
2023	Zackariah Jones	Twelve days in "dry cell" restraints	$500,000
2024	Raven v. Polis	Treatment of transgender women in custody	About $2.1 million plus a consent decree
2024	John Snorsky	Failure to protect from assault	$1.1 million
2026	Tajuddin Ashaheed	Religious accommodation (forced beard shaving)	$245,000
2026	Hastings v. Colorado Department of Corrections	On-call overtime for criminal investigators	Settlement in principle; amount undisclosed

=== Inmate labor ===
In the class-action case Mortis v. Polis, incarcerated plaintiffs alleged that CDOC compelled inmates to work by punishing refusals with solitary confinement and loss of privileges, in violation of Amendment A, the 2018 constitutional amendment that removed an exception allowing slavery and involuntary servitude as criminal punishment. After a trial that began in October 2025, Denver District Court Judge Sarah Wallace ruled in February 2026 that CDOC, Director Stancil, and Governor Polis had violated the state constitution, finding that "the machinery of coercion" was a "pervasive and actively operationalized feature" of the department's labor management. She ordered the department to stop using segregation and isolation to punish refusals to work. During the trial, Wallace toured the prison at the center of the case.

=== Solitary confinement ===
The department's long-term use of solitary confinement also generated litigation. In 2012 a federal judge ruled after a bench trial that CDOC had violated the Eighth Amendment rights of inmate Troy Anderson by holding him in administrative segregation for years with no outdoor exercise. When the department responded by transferring only Anderson and arguing the ruling applied to him alone, prisoners brought a class action, Decoteau v. Raemisch, on behalf of segregated inmates at the Colorado State Penitentiary, some of whom had not exercised outdoors in two decades. CDOC settled the case in 2016, agreeing to build outdoor recreation yards at the penitentiary and to guarantee yard access to its segregated population. In a related case, the Tenth Circuit granted prison officials qualified immunity over an 11-month denial of outdoor exercise, but when the U.S. Supreme Court declined to review that decision in 2018, Justice Sonia Sotomayor issued a statement calling such prolonged deprivation a "deeply troubling" practice that "cannot be squared with evolving standards of decency."

=== Transgender inmates ===
A 2019 class action brought on behalf of transgender women held in men's prisons alleged that CDOC had subjected them to sexual and physical violence and denied medically necessary care. A 2024 consent decree approved in Denver District Court required the department to expand health care, create voluntary specialized housing (including a 100-bed unit at the men's Sterling facility and an integration unit at the women's prison), and pay about $2.1 million to roughly 400 class members, without admitting liability.

=== Health, disability, and conditions ===
The department has paid substantial sums in medical neglect cases. In 2023 it agreed to an $8 million settlement with Christopher Tanner, who developed pneumonia at DRDC in 2020 and suffered amputations of a hand, fingers, and parts of both feet after a delay in hospitalization. In a separate case, a federal jury in 2022 awarded inmate Jason Brooks $3.5 million after the department failed to accommodate his ulcerative colitis under the Americans with Disabilities Act, causing him to miss thousands of meals; a federal judge upheld the award in 2024. The ACLU of Colorado also sued the department and the governor in 2020 over its handling of COVID-19 in the prisons. In 2022, the department settled a suit by Disability Law Colorado over its treatment of deaf and hard-of-hearing prisoners, agreeing to provide sign-language interpreters, captioned phones, videophones, and visual alerts. In a separate case, it paid $500,000 in 2023 to Zackariah Jones, who was held for twelve days in restraints in a "dry cell" at the Sterling Correctional Facility on an unfounded suspicion that he had swallowed contraband; the settlement prompted new statewide rules on hygiene during such confinement.

The department's deadliest medical neglect case was the 2013 death of Christopher Lopez, a 35-year-old mentally ill prisoner who died of treatable hyponatremia at the San Carlos Correctional Facility while staff, recorded on the facility's own video joking and laughing, left him strapped in a restraint chair through repeated seizures instead of summoning medical help; he had spent the preceding nine months in solitary confinement. Three employees were fired and five disciplined, and in 2014 the state paid his family $3 million to settle a lawsuit. In 2018, settling an ACLU class action over its practice of withholding hepatitis C treatment until inmates developed advanced liver damage, the department agreed to spend $41 million over two years to treat all of its roughly 2,200 infected prisoners.

=== Youthful Offender System ===
In late 2025, parents and the National Center for Youth Law alleged that young men held at the department's Youthful Offender System detention facility in Pueblo were not receiving enough food and were losing significant weight, with one hospitalized for malnutrition and kidney failure. CDOC said it had reduced the facility's calorie allotments (for men, from 3,200 to 2,700 per day) to match updated federal dietary guidelines as the population's average age rose, and that food was never withheld as punishment; state legislators questioned whether the change was a cost-cutting measure.

=== Religious accommodation ===
In 2026, the state agreed to pay $245,000 to Tajuddin Ashaheed, a Muslim former inmate who was forced to shave his beard during intake for a 2016 parole violation despite telling staff that doing so violated his faith and being threatened with solitary confinement if he refused. The settlement resolved a civil rights suit litigated for nearly a decade.

=== Employment litigation ===
The department has also been sued by its own employees. In Young v. Colorado Department of Corrections, a former correctional sergeant at Limon Correctional Facility alleged that a mandatory diversity, equity, and inclusion training program created a racially hostile work environment in violation of Title VII. A federal district court dismissed the suit in 2023, but in 2024 the Tenth Circuit described some of the training's content as "troubling," and the case remained on appeal as of early 2026. In a separate 2025 suit, a contract prison dentist, Charles Hardin, alleged he was fired hours after warning supervisors that the department over-relied on mercury dental amalgam rather than safer alternatives, which he said violated the state's whistleblower protections.

The department has also lost notable disciplinary appeals before the Colorado State Personnel Board. After CDOC fired Mathew Stiles, a boiler operator at the Denver Reception and Diagnostic Center, in 2015 over a single off-duty use of his wife's medical marijuana, an administrative law judge rescinded the termination as arbitrary and capricious and awarded back pay. The Colorado Court of Appeals affirmed, but in 2020 the Colorado Supreme Court reversed in Department of Corrections v. Stiles, holding that the Board must give deference to an agency's disciplinary decision rather than review it anew—a ruling the court noted would affect all 30,000-plus certified state employees. On remand, the administrative law judge applied the deferential standard and again found the firing arbitrary and capricious, ordering it rescinded with back pay. In 2025, another administrative law judge ordered the department to reinstate Gwendolyn Londenberg, a captain at the Colorado State Penitentiary with roughly twenty years of service, finding that her 2024 termination after a confrontation with a lieutenant was unsupported and that the department had discriminated against her on the basis of sex and retaliated against her in violation of the Colorado Anti-Discrimination Act; the order awarded about $65,000 in back pay.

Wage practices have drawn further litigation under the Fair Labor Standards Act. In 2022 the state paid approximately $5 million to settle Ruiz v. Colorado Department of Corrections, a collective action by community parole officers over unpaid on-call shifts on the department's electronic-monitoring response teams. In July 2026 the department reached a settlement in principle in Hastings v. Colorado Department of Corrections, a similar collective action brought in 2022 by criminal investigators in the Office of the Inspector General, who alleged they were denied overtime pay for mandatory on-call shifts of up to 90 hours in a single pay period; state attorneys had told lawmakers the department's exposure in the case could exceed $5 million.

=== Violence in custody ===
Assaults and homicides occur within the prisons. In a 2023 killing at the Limon Correctional Facility, inmate Arthur Price strangled a fellow prisoner, Paul Hack, who had been convicted of child sexual assault; Price pleaded guilty to second-degree murder in 2025 and received an additional 41-year sentence. The department has also paid to settle failure-to-protect claims: in 2024 it paid $1.1 million to John Snorsky, who was stabbed more than 40 times by other inmates at the Colorado State Penitentiary in 2017 after CDOC declined his repeated requests for protective custody. In June 2026, two inmates, Michael Fisher and Charles Gates, were killed and a third gravely wounded at the CoreCivic-operated Bent County Correctional Facility; dispatch records obtained by the Denver Post showed that staff waited more than two hours to summon an ambulance for the surviving victim. The department's Office of the Inspector General led the criminal investigation, and CDOC suspended visitation statewide.

=== Contraband and overdoses ===
Drug overdoses climbed in Colorado's prisons in the early 2020s as narcotics, including fentanyl, were smuggled in through the mail and other channels. In May 2021, an inmate at the Limon Correctional Facility died of a fentanyl overdose, and a correctional officer who responded was sickened by exposure. Five officers at Limon were arrested for smuggling contraband during 2021, and the department began photocopying prisoners' incoming mail to intercept drug-soaked paper.

=== Staff investigations ===
The department has placed senior staff on leave amid undisclosed internal investigations. In March 2025 it removed five officials over two days, among them Sterling warden Jeff Long and his brother Ryan Long, warden of the Denver Reception and Diagnostic Center; the two brothers remained on paid leave more than a year later, each drawing a salary above $130,000, while CDOC declined to say why, citing an exemption for records tied to an ongoing criminal investigation. Two other prison employees were separately charged with forging records.

=== Federal civil rights investigation ===
In December 2025, the United States Department of Justice Civil Rights Division opened a civil investigation into CDOC and the state's Division of Youth Services to determine whether people held in adult prisons and juvenile facilities receive their constitutional protections. Assistant Attorney General Harmeet Dhillon framed the inquiry as ensuring that those in state custody are not subjected to unconstitutional treatment; CDOC said it was reviewing the matter.

=== Private prisons ===
The state's continued use of for-profit prisons has been politically contested. As a 2018 candidate, Polis pledged to "end our investment in private prisons," and Democratic lawmakers later sought to phase out private incarceration on the grounds that profit incentives can undercut rehabilitation and safety. Supporters, including officials in the rural counties that host the prisons, argued that the facilities are major local employers and taxpayers and that private beds provide flexible capacity during overcrowding; critics highlighted high staff turnover at the CoreCivic facilities. Amid the 2025–2026 crowding crisis the administration reversed course. Rather than fund Governor Polis's request for one or two new state prisons, in April 2026 the Joint Budget Committee directed his office to submit an emergency supplemental budget request to contract with CoreCivic to reopen one of its shuttered Colorado prisons (most likely the Kit Carson Correctional Center in Burlington or the Huerfano County Correctional Center in Walsenburg) should the system run out of space, approving a rate of about $115 per inmate per day; reopening Huerfano was estimated to cost $150 to $200 million.

== See also ==
- List of Colorado state prisons
- List of law enforcement agencies in Colorado
- List of United States state correction agencies
- Incarceration in the United States
