= Murder of Warren Barnes =

2021 murder of a man in Colorado, US

- Photo of Warren Barnes
- Date: February 27, 2021
- Location: Grand Junction, Colorado, U.S.; 39.069072°N 108.576393°W
- Type: Murder by stabbing, dismemberment
- Perpetrator: Brian Cohee Jr.
- Deaths: Warren Barnes
- Verdict: Guilty
- Convictions: First degree murder; Tampering with evidence; Tampering with a human body
- Sentence: Life imprisonment without the possibility of parole for murder, 13.5 years for evidence tampering

On the night of February 27, 2021, Warren Barnes, a 69-year-old American man, was stabbed to death under a highway overpass in Grand Junction, Colorado, by Brian Cohee Jr., who was 19 years old. On February 3, 2023, Cohee was found guilty of first-degree murder and sentenced to life in prison without parole.

== Background ==
=== Victim ===
Warren Bruce Barnes was known in downtown Grand Junction, Colorado, for sitting on a chair and reading books outside a local bridal store. Because of his interest in books, some local storeowners nicknamed him "The Reading Man". People described Barnes as a "gentle" and "quiet" individual. The merchants and employees of nearby stores would offer him books, food and drink. He was 69 years old at the time of his murder.

=== Perpetrator ===
Brian Thomas Cohee Jr., born on January 10, 2002, was 19 years old at the time of the murder.

Cohee was diagnosed with ADHD at the age of five. In 2019, he was diagnosed with autism. Before the murder, Cohee was mentally ill and had persistent thoughts of murder. During his interrogation, he said that he wanted to kill a homeless person or a prostitute, believing that such a person's disappearance would go unnoticed. He routinely drove around at night surveilling homeless encampments. In 2018, he killed a cat and kept its head in his house for three days before discarding it. Because of his alleged fascination with serial killer Jeffrey Dahmer, Cohee was nicknamed "Dahmer" at the high school he attended.

== Murder ==
On March 1, 2021, about 1:48 p.m., a 911 call was made by Cohee's mother to report a decomposing human head and hands found in his bedroom closet. As police officers arrived at their house, Brian Cohee approached them and immediately confessed to murdering Barnes by saying "I've always wondered what murder felt like". He told officers the victim's name, the weapon used, and that he committed the murder under an overpass on Highway 340.

Cohee was detained and taken to the police station for interrogation. He told the interrogator that as he was driving on one of the roads under the overpass on the night of February 27, he saw Barnes sleeping on the ground beside railway tracks that ran between the roads. Cohee left his car, put on three layers of gloves, and started stabbing Barnes with a knife. According to Cohee, Barnes shouted, "What are you doing, why, why?" in a panic before dying. Cohee described himself as "growling" and making "animalistic noises" as he was stabbing Barnes. Cohee cut off Barnes's hands and head and put them in plastic bags, which he put in his car. Cohee drove them home and hid the bags, then cleaned the blood from his knife and car and went to sleep. Cohee compared himself to serial killer Edmund Kemper. Cohee confessed to traveling back to the crime scene, collecting the remaining body parts, putting them in the trunk of his car, and dumping them in the Colorado River, flooding his car in the process. His car was towed out of the water by police, and Cohee was allowed to leave the scene without suspicion. However, while pulling the car out the police noticed a red liquid resembling blood on the back of the trunk. He confessed to taking pictures of Barnes's body before deleting them "because they were evidence". The pictures were later recovered from his phone by the authorities. After the interrogation, he was arrested on three charges and taken to the Mesa County Detention Facility.

== Trial ==
Cohee's trial began on January 17, 2023. He was charged with first-degree murder, tampering with a deceased human body and tampering with evidence. He pleaded not guilty by reason of insanity. His attorneys argued that he murdered Barnes because he was driven insane by his diagnosed mental health conditions, which included major depressive disorder, autism, and ADHD, as well as environmental stressors, allegedly suffering a psychotic episode as soon as he saw Barnes' shelter. The prosecution, on the other hand, argued that Cohee had confessed to planning to murder someone, specifically a homeless person, months before the murder and that he attempted to get rid of Barnes's body, proving that he understood consequences of his actions. Testimonies from his therapist, family doctor, and psychologist were presented during the trial.

On February 3, 2023, a Mesa County jury found Cohee guilty on all three charges. At his sentencing, Cohee's mother Terri asked that Cohee's sentence include mental health treatment; she described him as having "struggled for his entire life with emotions", and stated that he "does not think and feel like the rest of us." Cohee did not speak at his sentencing. Ultimately, the judge sentenced him to life in prison with no possibility of parole for murder and 13.5 years for evidence tampering charges.

As of 2025, Cohee is incarcerated at the Buena Vista Correctional Facility in Buena Vista, Colorado.

== Aftermath ==
In November 2021, a metal memorial statue for Barnes was constructed by Tim Navin outside the bridal store where Barnes habitually sat and read. The statue is a replica of the chair in which he sat.

=== Appearances in Popular Media ===
The story of the investigation into Barnes' murder and the capture of Cohee is the subject of Season 1, Episode 6 of the A&E television series, Crime in Progress. The episode, titled "Kidnapper's House/Mother's Nightmare," aired February 5, 2026.

== See also ==
- Crime in Colorado
- Murder in United States law
- Thrill killing
- Discrimination against homeless people
