= Fremont Correctional Facility =

State prison in Canon City, Colorado, US

Coordinates: 38°25′22″N 105°09′42″W

- Interactive map of Fremont Correctional Facility
- Location: E US Highway 50 Evans Blvd Cañon City, Colorado
- Status: open
- Security class: close, medium, minimum
- Capacity: 1661
- Opened: 1962
- Managed by: Colorado Department of Corrections

Fremont Correctional Facility (FCF) is a state prison located in the East Canon prison complex in Fremont County, just east of Canon City, Colorado.

FCF offers treatment programs for special inmate populations such as sex offenders and drug abusers. Approximately 85% of the inmates housed at FCF have been convicted of sexual offenses. FCF is one of the few state prisons in Colorado to offer a sex offender treatment program.

Other prisons in the East Cañon Complex include the Arrowhead Correctional Center, the Centennial Correctional Facility, Four Mile Correctional Center, the Colorado State Penitentiary, and Skyline Correctional Center, all nearby in unincorporated Fremont County.

== Notable inmates ==
- Lester Ralph Jones – Sentenced to life imprisonment without the possibility of parole for the kidnapping and murder of Paige Birgfeld.
- Travis Forbes - Sentenced to life imprisonment without the possibility of parole for the murder of Kenia Monge in 2011 after offering her a ride home while she was intoxicated.
