= List of U.S. counties by income =

The following lists of U.S. counties by income are available :

- List of lowest-income counties in the United States
- List of highest-income counties in the United States
