= Kit Carson (disambiguation) =

Kit Carson (Christopher Houston Carson, 1809–1868) was an American frontiersman.

Kit Carson may also refer to:

== Arts and entertainment ==
=== Fictional characters ===
- Kit Carson in The Adventures of Kit Carson, 1951–1955 American TV series, inspired by the historic Kit Carson
- Kit Carson, from the Italian comics series Tex
- Kit Carson, from the Time Scout series by Robert Asprin

=== Film ===
- Kit Carson (1903 film), one of the first Westerns
- Kit Carson (1928 film), an American Western silent film
- Kit Carson (1940 film), starring Jon Hall

== Places in the United States ==
- Kit Carson, Colorado, in Cheyenne County
- Kit Carson County, Colorado
- Kit Carson Peak, or Kit Carson Mountain, in Colorado
- Kit Carson Park, in Escondido, California
- Mount Kit Carson, in Washington state

== People with the nickname ==
- Kit Carson (baseball) (Walter Lloyd Carson, 1912–1983), American baseball player
- Leonard K. Carson (1923–1994), American fighter ace
- L. M. Kit Carson (Lewis Minor Carson, 1941–2014), American actor and screenwriter
- Michael Carson (1943/4–2019), English football coach implicated in the UK football sexual abuse scandal
- Homer Lloyd Carson (1899–1983), Johnny Carson's father
- Christopher Carson (died 2015), Chief of staff on The Rush Limbaugh Show

== Other uses ==
- Kit Carson Correctional Center, a former prison in Kit Carson County, Colorado, US

== See also ==
- Kit Carson Scouts, a US Marine Corps program in the Vietnam War
