= Colorado State Penitentiary =

Building in Colorado, United States of America

Coordinates: 38°26′27″N 105°09′29″W

- Interactive map of Colorado State Penitentiary
- Location: E US Highway 50 Evans Blvd, Cañon City, Colorado, U.S.
- Capacity: 756
- Opened: 1993
- Managed by: Colorado Department of Corrections

Colorado State Penitentiary (commonly abbreviated CSP) is a Level V maximum security prison in the U.S. state of Colorado. The facility is part of the state's East Cañon Complex, together with six other state correctional facilities of various security levels.

== Description ==
CSP is located in Fremont County, just east of the county seat Cañon City, Colorado. It is one of 25 prisons in the Colorado Department of Corrections system, and one of seven in and around Cañon City.

The oldest of the seven, originally built in 1871 and predating Colorado's statehood, was the original State Penitentiary. This was the site of Colorado's death row, and the 1929 prison riot. After the 1993 construction of the current facility, that prison was re-dedicated as the medium-security Colorado Territorial Correctional Facility. It is located within the city limits of Cañon City.

Other prisons in the East Cañon Complex include the Arrowhead Correctional Center, the Centennial Correctional Facility, Four Mile Correctional Center, the Fremont Correctional Facility, and Skyline Correctional Center, all nearby in unincorporated Fremont County. The Colorado Women's Correctional Facility near Cañon City in unincorporated Fremont County was decommissioned on June 4, 2009.

Today CSP houses some of Colorado's most dangerous, most violent and most disruptive prisoners. It also held the state's lethal injection chamber for execution of the death penalty. The prisoners with death sentences were held on "death row" at Sterling Correctional Facility.

All inmates at Colorado State Penitentiary are held in solitary confinement, officially termed Administrative Segregation (AdSeg). AdSeg inmates are all held in solitary cells on 23-hour lockdown for their entire sentence. CSP allows offenders out of their cells for an hour per day, including yard time. Such conditions have been held to be adverse for prisoners' mental health and can aggravate existing mental problems. Prolonged solitary confinement has been argued to constitute torture and to violate international law.

As of 2011 the prison has 984 prisoners.

== Death row ==
When the Colorado State Penitentiary opened, death row was moved there from the Colorado Territorial Correctional Facility. Colorado has had no physical death row since 2011, when the State of Colorado moved its death row prisoners to the Sterling Correctional Facility. This was done in settlement of a federal lawsuit filed by Nathan Dunlap, a death row prisoner who had complained about the adverse effects of his physical and mental health of the state's lack of outdoor exercise facilities at Colorado State Penitentiary. By state statute, inmates sentenced to death are executed at the Colorado State Penitentiary. Each is held here for the week before a scheduled execution in a separate holding cell located in the execution suite. All prisoners with death sentences are classified as "securest custody level, administrative segregation".

Capital Punishment was abolished by the legislature for any crime committed after July 2020 in Colorado, with the only three men on death row being granted clemency from suffering death by governor Jared Polis.

== Notable inmates ==
- Anton Woode, aka "Kid Wallace," - Youngest person in Colorado State history to be tried as an adult. Woode was tried as an adult and was convicted of second-degree murder on March 24, 1893, and he started serving a 25-year sentence at the prison on April 8 of that same year. Woode was convicted of shooting Denver businessman Joseph Smith in the back during a rabbit hunting excursion, after which he robbed Smith of a coveted gold watch and shotgun.
- Charles 'Chucky' Limbrick Jr. - Convicted of 1st Degree murder in 1988, when he was 15 years old, for the death of his mother in Colorado Springs, and sentenced to 40 years to life. Released from prison on parole in 2011 by orders of Colorado Governor Bill Ritter.
- Scott Lee Kimball - Serial killer, sentenced to 70 years in 2009, held at the prison following an escape attempt from Sterling in 2017 until transfer to federal prison in 2021.
- James Eagan Holmes - sentenced to 12 consecutive life sentences plus 3318 years for the 2012 Aurora, Colorado shooting in a movie theater, in which he killed twelve people and wounded many others. Transferred to USP Allenwood in Pennsylvania.
- Joe Arridy - A mentally disabled person who was wrongfully executed for the rape and murder of Dorothy Drain, a crime he did not commit. He was posthumously pardoned in 2011 by Colorado governor Bill Ritter.
- Jack Gilbert Graham - Responsible for bombing of United Airlines Flight 629 carrying his mother, killing all passengers.
- Benjamin Ratcliff - Hanged on February 7, 1896, for the 1895 murders of three school-board members in Park County.
- Nathan Dunlap - Sentenced to death in 1996 in Arapahoe County for killing four people during a revenge killing and robbery at an Aurora Chuck E. Cheese restaurant in 1993. Dunlap was granted a temporary reprieve from execution by Colorado Governor John Hickenlooper in 2013. Dunlap's sentence was commuted to life without parole after the state abolished the death penalty.
- Sir Mario Owens - in 2008, sentenced to death in Arapahoe County for the murder of witnesses of a previous murder for which he was convicted. His sentence was commuted to life without parole on March 23, 2020, after the state abolished the death penalty.
- Robert Ray - in 2010, sentenced to death in Arapahoe County. He is the co-defendant in the same case as Sir Mario Owens. His sentence was commuted to life without parole on March 23, 2020, after abolition of the death penalty.
- Freddie Glenn - Murdered actor Kelsey Grammer’s sister, Karen, and two other men in 1975. Transferred here from Limon Correctional Facility.

== In popular media ==
CSP was the focus of the documentary series National Geographic Explorer episode "Solitary Confinement". The episode was first broadcast April 11, 2010.

The original penitentiary was the subject of the 1948 semi-documentary Canon City, chronicling the December 30, 1947, prison break of 12 inmates. Principal filming was conducted in the prison and environs of Cañon City six months after the actual event.

Maximum Insecurity, an Amazon bestseller, gives an inside look at the medical system at the Colorado State Penitentiary.

In Tallgrass, a novel by Sandra Dallas, Bobby Archuleta, a beet farmer who confesses to raping and killing his sister-in-law, a teenage girl with polio, is sent to the Colorado State Penitentiary after confessing.
