= La Vista Correctional Facility =

Prison in Pueblo, Colorado, United States

Coordinates: 38°16′55″N 104°37′37″W

- Interactive map of La Vista Correctional Facility
- Location: 1401 W 17th Street, Pueblo, Colorado, U.S.
- Status: Open
- Security class: Mixed
- Capacity: 564
- Opened: April 2006
- Managed by: Colorado Department of Corrections

La Vista Correctional Facility (LVCF) is a state prison located in Pueblo, Colorado, United States, owned and operated by the Colorado Department of Corrections. The facility partially opened in April 2006, ramping up to its maximum capacity of 564 inmates.

La Vista is primarily a medium security facility for women. LVCF formerly housed a small number of transgender inmates and a small number of male inmates with medical conditions that require constant care or hospice; however, they were moved to Colorado Territorial Correctional Facility. LVCF also has a small Administrative Segregation (AdSeg, or solitary confinement) tower where LVCF female inmates, as well as male and female offenders from the Youthful Offender System (YOS) prison, can be temporarily housed for administrative or behavioral issues. All new YOS offenders spend the first 28 days of their YOS sentence in LVCF's AdSeg tower, where they undergo the orientation training phase of (YOS).

Since 2006 La Vista has implemented a program where inmates may volunteer to work in the surrounding farm fields at harvest time, replacing foreign migrant labor, which has been increasingly hard to find due to immigration crackdowns. As of 2010 farmers were paying the DOC $9.60 per person per hour. A portion of that rate goes to the inmate.

== Notable inmates ==
Notable current and former inmates of the prison include:

- Malaika Griffin - Anti-white racist convicted of the 1999 murder of Jason Patrick Horsley
- Tina Peters - Former Clerk and Recorder of Mesa County, Colorado. Convicted of conspiracy to commit criminal impersonation and attempting to influence a public servant in connection with trying to prove the unsubstantiated conspiracy of voter fraud in the 2020 United States presidential election.
