= Youthful Offender System (Pueblo, Colorado) =

Prison in Colorado, United States

Coordinates: 38°16′43″N 104°37′28″W

- Interactive map of Youthful Offender System
- Location: 1300 W 13th Street Pueblo, Colorado
- Status: open
- Security class: mixed security, male & female youthful offenders (14-25)
- Capacity: 256
- Opened: 1994
- Managed by: Colorado Department of Corrections

The Youthful Offender System (YOS) is a medium security prison in Pueblo, Colorado. YOS houses male and female offenders between ages 14–19. Inmates at YOS have all been convicted of a violent felony, except Class 1 felonies, and sentenced as adults through the state's Department of Corrections (DOC) system. They are not sentenced as juveniles or sentenced through the Department of Youth Services system. Offenders can only be sent to YOS if their sentencing judge recommends them for the YOS program. The judge makes this determination based on the offender's age and perceived amenability for rehabilitation. The maximum sentence a YOS inmate can serve is 7 years, no matter what their original charge was, and the minimum sentence a YOS inmate can serve is 2 years. YOS sentencing is in lieu of jail sentences and if the offender fails the YOS program they will have to serve the jail sentence that has been suspended.

YOS is set up as a four-part continuum of rehabilitation for youth offenders. It consists of Orientation and Training, Institutionalization, Pre-Release, and Community Supervision. YOS has the lowest recidivism rate of any Colorado state prison. According to CDOC statistics, the 3-year recidivism rate of YOS offenders is around 20%. More than 80% of YOS offenders leave the facility with a high school diploma.
