= Crowley County Correctional Facility =

Prison in Olney Springs, Colorado, United States

Coordinates: 38°09′43″N 103°57′31″W

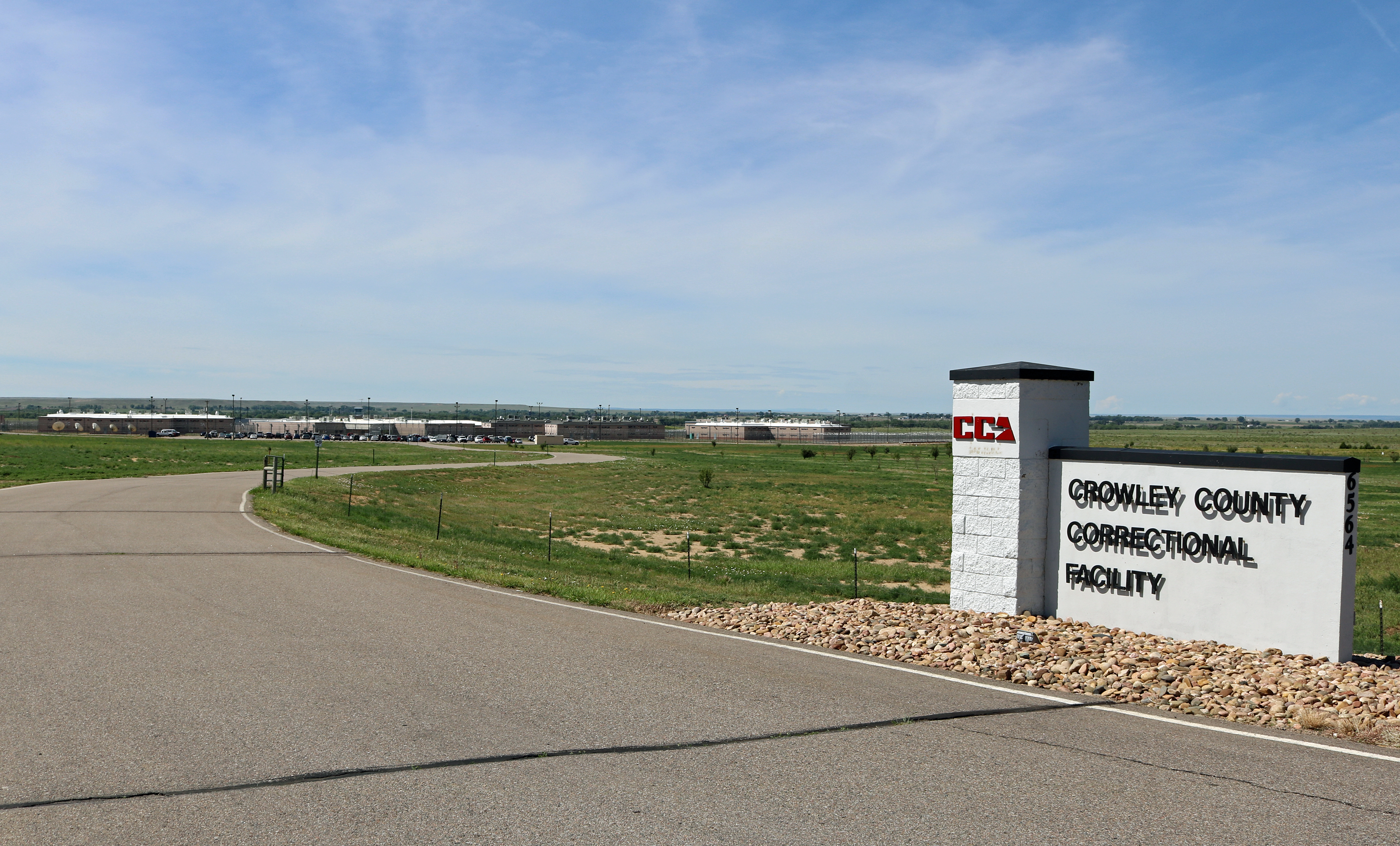
- The facility's entrance.
- Interactive map of Crowley County Correctional Facility
- Location: 6564 CO-96 Olney Springs, Colorado
- Status: open
- Security class: medium
- Capacity: 1894
- Opened: 1998
- Managed by: CoreCivic

The Crowley County Correctional Facility is a medium-security, privately owned and operated state prison for men located in Olney Springs, Crowley County, Colorado. CoreCivic runs it under contract with the Colorado Department of Corrections.

The facility was constructed by Dominion Correctional Services of Oklahoma, and opened in 1998. It was first operated by Correctional Services Corporation. After a riot in 1999, Dominion assumed direct operations itself. It was purchased by Corrections Corporation of America in 2002 and subsequently expanded. It houses 1,894 Colorado state inmates in medium security.

In 2004 the facility housed both Colorado inmates and out-of-state inmates, under contracts with the Wyoming Department of Corrections and the Washington State Department of Corrections. The causes of a six-hour riot on July 20, 2004 were attributed partly to understaffing (only 47 employees on duty to supervise more than 1100 prisoners) and partly to the treatment of the Washington prisoners. A class-action suit was filed on behalf of 200 prisoners who had not joined in the riot, but who had been mistreated afterward. The suit resulted in a $600,000 settlement in 2013.
