= Persistent poverty county =

Classification for United States counties

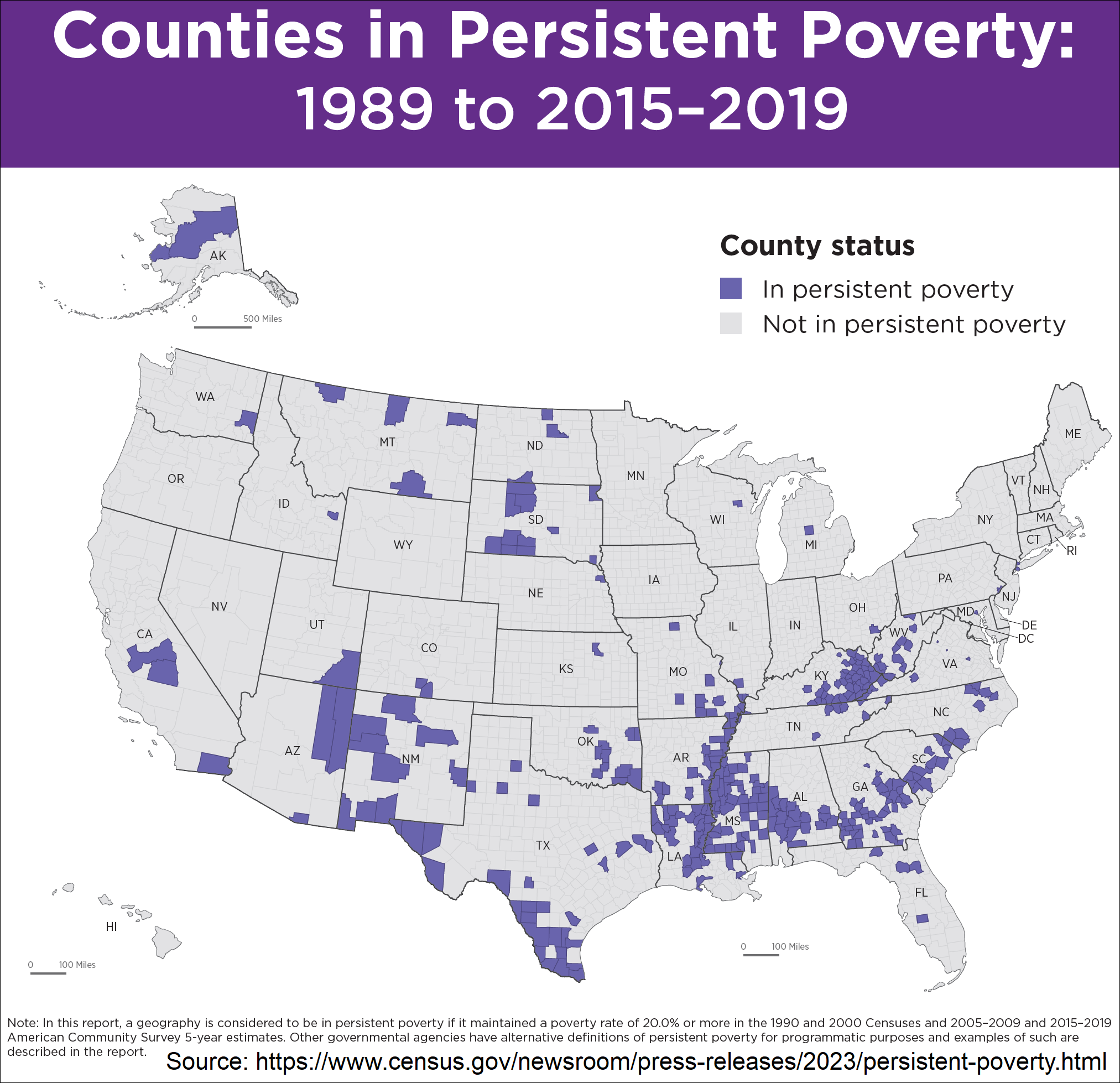
A map of the United States highlighting counties defined as "persistent poverty counties."

A persistent poverty county is a classification for counties in the United States that have had a relatively high rate of poverty over a long period.

A 2009 U.S. federal law defined a persistent poverty county as one in which "20 percent or more of its population [has lived] in poverty over the past 30 years" according to the Census, which is done every 10 years. The Economic Research Service (ERS) of the U.S. Department of Agriculture categorizes non-metropolitan counties by their dominant economic foundation and by characteristic policy type. Persistent poverty counties are defined as those where 20% or more of the county population in each of the last four decennial Censuses had poverty level household incomes.

In 2000, there were 386 such counties concentrated largely in the Delta South, Central Appalachia, Rio Grande Valley, the Northern Great Plains, and western Alaska. The average poverty rate in these counties was approximately 29% in 1989.

A 2020 GAO study identified 409 persistent poverty counties, as measured by the 1990 and 2000 censuses and the 2017 Small Area Income and Poverty Estimates. These counties are largely rural and predominantly located in the Southern United States.

Many of these counties are served by the Delta Regional Authority or Appalachian Regional Commission.

This data does not include unincorporated territories of the United States.

== See also ==
- Poverty in the United States
- List of lowest-income places in the United States
- List of lowest-income counties in the United States
- List of U.S. states by minimum wage
