= Murder of Paige Birgfeld =

2007 disappearance and murder of a woman in Colorado, US

- Publicity photo of Birgfeld

- Location of Grand Junction in Mesa County, Colorado
- Location: 38.815155°N 108.278890°W; Kidnapping: Grand Junction, Colorado, U.S. Body Found: Route 50, Wells Gulch, Delta County, Colorado, U.S.
- Date: June 28, 2007
- Attack type: Murder, kidnapping
- Victim: Paige Birgfeld
- Perpetrator: Lester Jones
- Charges: Kidnapping; First degree murder; Felony murder; Second-degree murder
- Verdict: Guilty of all charges
- Sentence: Life imprisonment without the possibility of parole

On June 28, 2007, Paige Birgfeld, a 34‑year‑old woman, disappeared from Grand Junction, Colorado. She was reported missing two days later by her eight‑year‑old daughter. On July 1, 2007, Birgfeld's red Ford Focus was found on fire in a parking lot a few miles from her home, with no sign of her. The investigation changed focus when authorities learned that she had been working as an escort through a secret business called Models Inc., using the alias "Carrie".

Her remains were found on March 6, 2012, in the Route 50 area of Wells Gulch in Delta County, approximately 30 miles (48 km) southeast of Grand Junction. Duct tape was found among the remains, leading authorities to conclude that Birgfeld had been kidnapped and murdered. Lester Ralph Jones, a former client with a history of domestic violence, became the prime suspect. In November 2014, the 63‑year‑old Jones was charged with kidnapping, first‑degree murder, felony murder, and second‑degree murder. On December 27, 2016, he was found guilty on all charges and sentenced to life imprisonment without the possibility of parole. As of 2021, he was serving his sentence at the Fremont Correctional Facility. Birgfeld's disappearance and murder attracted national attention and received extensive media coverage.

== Victim ==
Paige Meredith Birgfeld was born on April 27, 1973, in Atlanta, Georgia. She later moved with her parents to Denver, Colorado, where she attended high school. In 1995, Birgfeld married her high school boyfriend, Howard "Ron" Beigler. Birgfeld studied nursing for a period at the University of Florida. The couple divorced in 1997 because Beigler did not want children and Birgfeld did.

In 1997, Birgfeld met Rob Dixon, a wealthy businessman whom she married a year later. They moved to a large house on Hill Avenue in Grand Junction, Colorado. Birgfeld and Dixon had three children: Jess, Taft, and Kohl. Her parents described her as "a loving, devoted, and excellent mother". Birgfeld and Dixon's relationship was volatile. In 2004, she called 911 after a dispute. She stated that Dixon had threatened that she would "come home and find [their children] all murdered". In 2005, Birgfeld accused Dixon of attacking her, and he was charged with third-degree assault. They divorced in 2006, and Dixon moved to Philadelphia, Pennsylvania. Birgfeld kept the house and custody of their three children.

After her second divorce, Birgfeld worked several jobs. She ran a pre-school dance business and sold high-end kitchen supplies for Pampered Chef. At the time of her disappearance, she had begun reconnecting romantically with her first ex‑husband.

== Disappearance ==
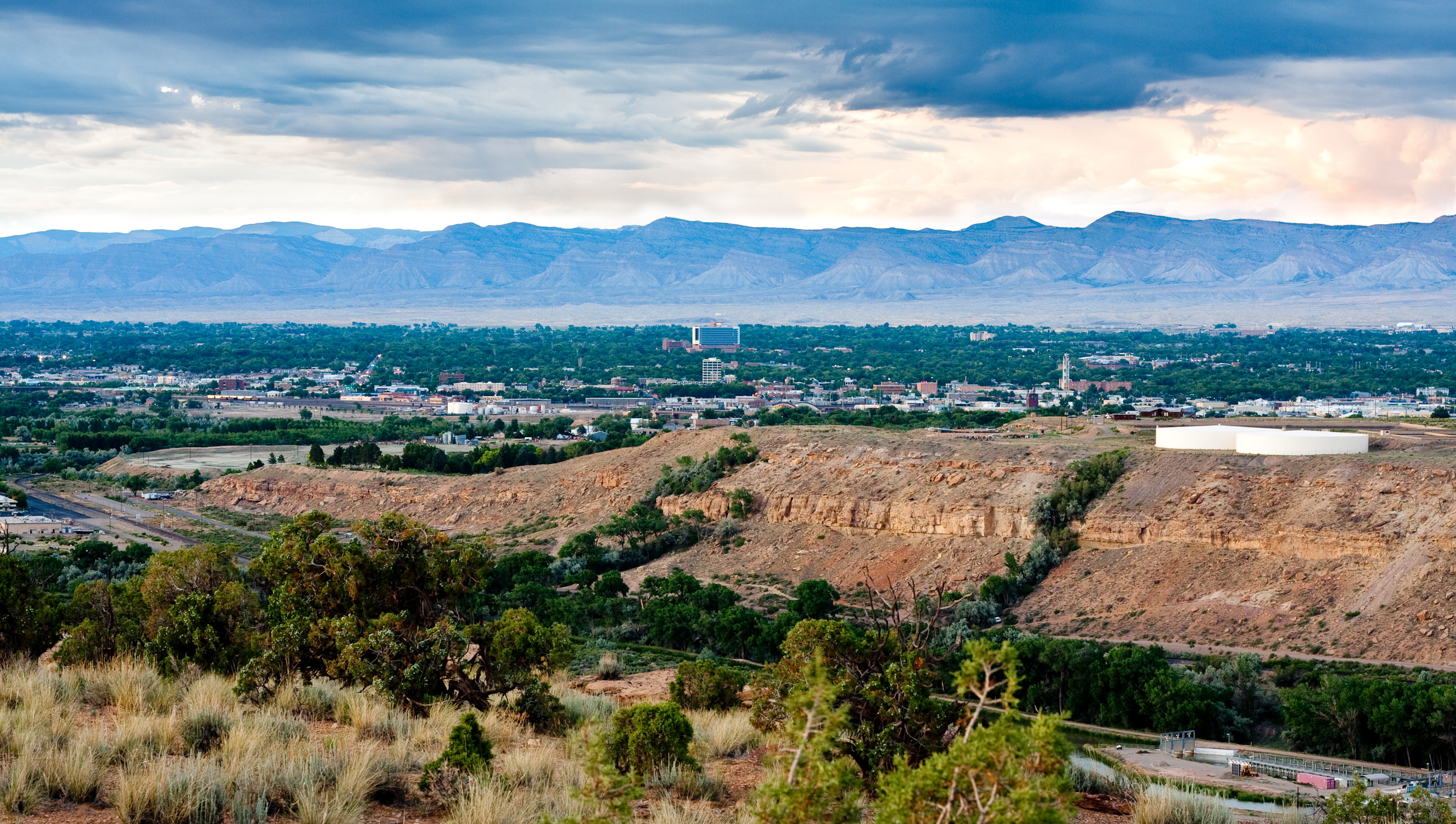
Grand Junction, the city where Birgfeld resided at time of her disappearance.

On June 28, 2007, Birgfeld left her home around 1 p.m. to meet Beigler for a picnic day. They were together until 7 p.m., then separated and stayed in contact by phone. Beigler was one of the last people to see and speak to Birgfeld alive. She never returned home.

Two days later, Birgfeld's eight-year-old daughter, Jess, went to the Mesa County Sheriff's Office with her nanny to report her mother missing. After the disappearance, Birgfeld's brother, Craig, moved with his family from Seattle, Washington, to her house to help care for the three children. Mesa County Sheriff Stan Hilkey stated that Birgfeld had not left of her own accord.

On July 1, around 10 p.m., a 911 call reported a burning vehicle in an empty parking lot two miles from Birgfeld's house. The car was identified as her red Ford Focus. In the car and on Highway 50, police found personal items, checks, and business cards from a company named Models Inc. Police examined Birgfeld's computer and cell phone and learned that Models Inc. was an escort business managed by her. They also found websites with her photo, where she was known as a high‑priced escort named "Carrie". Birgfeld was leading a secret double life as an escort. According to her parents, she likely did it to support her children financially. Beigler stated that she had previously worked as a freelance exotic dancer.

== Search and investigation ==
The Mesa County Sheriff's Office and the Grand Junction community launched a "massive" search for Birgfeld. Search parties were dispatched throughout the area, and missing-person posters were put up. Many volunteers participated in the search in vehicles, on horseback, and with diving equipment.

The Sheriff's Office had several suspects, including Birgfeld's ex‑husbands, especially Dixon, but both had alibis. At the start of the investigation, authorities focused on Beigler because he had been with Birgfeld on the day of her disappearance. The Sheriff's Office also had the names of clients of Models Inc., which produced more than 60 suspects. In October 2007, Chief Deputy District Attorney Dan Rubenstein's team identified the main suspect because he used a Trac Phone.

The suspect was Lester Ralph Jones, then 56, a motorhome mechanic who was married at the time. Jones initially denied knowing Birgfeld until officers showed him call logs showing contact with Birgfeld and her escort agency before her disappearance. Jones had a previous criminal record, including a five-year prison sentence for first-degree assault and second-degree attempted kidnapping of his ex-wife. Rubenstein said that both he and the police were certain Jones was responsible for Birgfeld's disappearance, but it was difficult to arrest him without her body.

=== Discovery of body ===
On March 6, 2012, at 12:30 pm, hikers found skeletal remains in the US Highway 50 area of Wells Gulch in Delta County, approximately 30 miles (48 km) southeast of Grand Junction. Police identified the remains as Birgfeld through dental records. Rubenstein said, "There were some very key evidentiary things that we located, specifically there was duct tape that was around her skull and mandible, that indicates that she was kidnapped". Prosecutors and police concluded that Birgfeld had been kidnapped and murdered. Because of the condition of the remains, they were unable to determine the cause of death.

== Criminal action ==
In November 2014, Jones was charged with kidnapping, first-degree murder, felony murder, and second-degree murder involving the death of Birgfeld.

On July 25, 2016, the first trial began. Prosecutors argued that Jones kidnapped and murdered Birgfeld, drove her car down Highway 50, dumped her body in a ravine, and then returned to Grand Junction, where he set her car on fire. Jones was initially charged with arson, but the charge was later dismissed because the statute of limitations had expired. In September 2016, the first trial against Jones was declared a mistrial because the jury could not reach on a verdict.

In the second trial, on December 27, 2016, the jury found Jones guilty of all charges. He was sentenced to life imprisonment without the possibility of parole. Jones is currently serving his sentence at the Fremont Correctional Facility in Cañon City, Colorado.

== In the media ==
=== Television ===
- 48 Hours S21E16 "The Secret Life of Paige Birgfeld." (2008) – First broadcast in the US on June 10, 2008, prior to the discovery of Birgfeld's body in March 2012 by CBS.
- 48 Hours S27E62 "The Secret Life of Paige Birgfeld." (2015) - First broadcast in the US on September 5, 2015 prior to the trial of Lester Ralph Jones.
- Disappeared S01E2 "A Mother's Secret" (2010) – First broadcast in the US on January 11, 2010, prior to the discovery of her body in March 2012.
- Dateline NBC S23E52 "The Secret Life of a Soccer Mom" (2015) – First broadcast in the US on May 29, 2015.
- Dateline: Secrets Uncovered S9E44 "Double Lives" (2021) – First broadcast in the US on February 12, 2021.
- 20/20 (2021) – ABC News premiered a special episode about the disappearance and murder of Paige Birgfeld in May, 2021.
- The Killer in My Family S04E7 "Lester Jones" (2023) – First broadcast in the UK on June 2, 2023, about Lisa Nance, Jones's former wife, describing the abuse she endured during their marriage. Nance testified in the trial.
- World's Most Evil Killers S08E1 "Lester Jones" (2023) – First broadcast in the UK on November 23, 2023.

== See also ==
- Crime in Colorado
- List of kidnappings (2000–2009)
- List of solved missing person cases (post-2000)
