= Buena Vista Correctional Facility =

State prison in Buena Vista, Colorado

Coordinates: 38°49′19″N 106°07′04″W

- Interactive map of Buena Vista Correctional Facility
- Location: 15125 US-24 Buena Vista, Colorado
- Status: Open
- Security class: Mixed
- Capacity: 1259
- Opened: 1892 (as Colorado State Reformatory); 1978 (as adult prison)
- Managed by: Colorado Department of Corrections

The Buena Vista Correctional Facility, also known as Buena Vista Correctional Complex, is a state prison for men located in Buena Vista, Chaffee County, Colorado, owned and operated by the Colorado Department of Corrections. The facility opened as an adult prison in 1978, and houses 871 inmates at medium and close security levels, along with the 288-inmate Buena Vista Minimum Center, and another 100 minimum security inmates within the Colorado Correctional Alternative Program ("Boot Camp"). The Minimum security building is referred to as "The Mods" by the inmates, and the medium security facility is called "The Buildings."

The prison is split into 6 Housing units A&O which is an Orientation unit that inmates are placed in when they first arrive to the prison. Segregation is the unit where inmates are placed for disciplinary actions, North Unit, Lower North Unit, East Unit and South Unit which houses the majority of the prisons active gang members and violent offenders. In the late 90s and Early 2000s "The Buildings was referred to as "Gladiator School" because most of Colorado's younger gang members were sent there. During that time the fighting and violence was at a record High in the State.

The site was first founded in 1892 as the Colorado State Reformatory for juvenile offenders, it was later transitioned to an adult prison in the late 70’s, making it the second oldest prison in the state, after the Colorado Territorial Correctional Facility.

== Notable Inmates ==
Brian Cohee Jr. is serving a sentence of life in prison without the possibility of parole for his murder of 69-year-old Warren Barnes in Grand Junction, Colorado.
