= Freddie Glenn =

African-American spree killer and rapist

- Born: Freddie Lee Glenn; January 6, 1957 (age 69); St. Petersburg, Florida, U.S.
- Known for: Murder of Karen Grammer
- Convictions: First degree murder (3 counts); Second degree kidnapping; Aggravated robbery
- Penalty: Death (1976); Commuted to life imprisonment

Details
- Victims: 3
- Date: June 19 – July 1, 1975
- Country: United States
- State: Colorado
- Location: Colorado Springs
- Killed: 3 (2–3 as an accomplice)
- Weapon: Knife (allegedly)
- Imprisoned at: Fremont Correctional Facility

Freddie Lee Glenn (born January 6, 1957) is an American spree killer. Along with his accomplices, Michael Corbett and Larry Dunn, Glenn was responsible for three murders in and around Colorado Springs, Colorado in 1975. Glenn's most notable victim of the crime was Karen Grammer, the younger sister of actor Kelsey Grammer.

In recent years, Glenn has disputed his role in the murders, claiming that he never personally killed anyone, although he admitted to being an accomplice to the murders. He claimed that he drove Corbett and Dunn during the crime spree, thus making him an active participant in all the robberies and kidnappings they committed, and was present for the murder of Karen Grammer. He denied raping or personally killing Grammer. Corbett offered this version of events in statements made before he died in prison in 2019. Corbett took sole responsibility for the murders of Daniel Van Lone and Winfred Profitt and claimed that Larry Dunn had murdered Karen Grammer. Dunn had received full immunity in exchange for testifying against Glenn and Corbett. He later committed other crimes and died in prison in Louisiana in 2015.

At the time, Glenn rejected a plea offer for a 10-year sentence in exchange for testimony against Corbett. Glenn later claimed he rejected it because he was terrified of Corbett, who was linked to two other murders, and feared reprisals that could result from him being branded a snitch.

== Early life ==
Glenn was born in St. Petersburg, Florida. He is of African descent. His father was in the military, and the family lived in Fort Lewis in Washington.

== Murders ==
On June 19, 1975, Glenn, a civilian employee at Fort Carson; Michael Corbett, a soldier; and another soldier, Larry Dunn, kidnapped Daniel Van Lone, a 29-year-old cook who was leaving his job at the Four Seasons Motor Inn. Intending to rob him, they drove Van Lone to a remote area. While Glenn waited in the car, Corbett and Dunn made Van Lone lie on the ground, after which Corbett shot him in the head. They stole 50 cents from him. Eight days later, Glenn and Corbett met Winfred Proffitt, age 19, another Fort Carson soldier, at Prospect Lake. They intended to sell him some marijuana. Having been trained in the use of bayonets, Corbett stabbed Proffitt with one of them to see what it was like. Corbett later said that Glenn was waiting in the car when he committed the murder.

Glenn and Corbett committed their final and most publicized murder on July 1, 1975. Glenn, Corbett, and two other men, Larry Dunn and Eric McLeod, decided to rob a Red Lobster restaurant, located on South Academy Boulevard. They left without any money. An employee of the restaurant, 18-year-old Karen Grammer, was waiting for her boyfriend to finish work. Thinking she may be able to identify them, the four men kidnapped her.

After robbing a convenience store, the men took Grammer to the apartment they shared, where they repeatedly raped her. They promised to take Grammer home, but instead put a cloth over her head, then drove her to a mobile home park on South Wahsatch Avenue. Glenn, who according to court testimony by Larry Dunn, had taken LSD, stabbed Grammer in the throat, back and hand, and left her to die. However, this testimony has been disputed. Glenn accepted responsibility for his involvement, but said Dunn was supposed to release Grammer and had asked him to help untie her. There was a struggle and Glenn said he could not recall what happened next since he was on drugs at the time. Corbett said Dunn was the one who had actually stabbed Grammer.

In an attempt to save herself, Grammer ran toward the back porch of a nearby home, but the homeowners were not present. She died at the property, leaving bloody hand and fingerprints where she tried to reach the doorbell. For a week, police were unable to determine who she was until her roommate at the time called to report her missing. Grammer's older brother Kelsey subsequently identified her.

== Trial and conviction ==
Glenn was convicted in May 1976 of three counts of first degree murder in the deaths of Daniel Van Lone, Winfred Profitt, and Karen Grammer. Judge Hunter Hardeman, noting "there was no rhyme or reason for what happened," sentenced Glenn to die in the gas chamber for Karen Grammer's murder.

McLeod pleaded guilty to rape and armed robbery and was sentenced to 15 to 20 years in prison.

Two years later, the Colorado Supreme Court overturned the state's death penalty. When Glenn was sentenced, the law allowed parole after he served 10 years. Because he was sentenced to three consecutive life terms, he became eligible for parole in 2006. Corbett remained in prison until his death in 2019.

== Parole denials ==
In 2009, Glenn was denied parole once after the Colorado Parole Board received a letter from Karen's brother, actor Kelsey Grammer, who described Glenn as a "butcher" and a "monster". The board also heard testimonies from several other relatives of the victims and from detectives before deciding not to release Glenn from prison. Grammer had originally planned to attend the hearing at the state's Limon Correctional Facility, but a rain delay caused him to miss a connecting flight to Denver. Instead, Grammer sent a letter to Robert Russel, the retired El Paso County, Colorado District Attorney who successfully prosecuted Glenn. During the hearing, Glenn told the board, "I apologize for my participation in something so terrible. I am sincerely and truly remorseful."

In his letter to Russel, Grammer described his sister, who had graduated from high school a year earlier and decided to take a year off after attending a semester of college. He said that she may have moved to Colorado Springs because of a boy she liked. Grammer wrote:

She was so smart and good and decent. She wrote poetry and loved being alive; we could laugh for hours together... I was supposed to protect her — I could not. I have never gotten over it. I was supposed to save her. I could not. It very nearly destroyed me... When we heard this man might be paroled, the suffering began anew.

In 2014, Glenn was eligible for parole, but he was denied twice, and his request was deferred for three years. At that parole board hearing, Kelsey Grammer delivered his emotional testimony via video conference, where he offered forgiveness after being convinced that Glenn was remorseful for killing his sister. However, Grammer has said that Glenn should stay behind bars and serve out the remainder of his life sentence. In 2017, Grammer repeated his position when Glenn became eligible for parole again, in which he stated that Glenn would not deserve freedom in the future.

Glenn was denied parole again in 2022 and will have another hearing in 2027.
