= Fort Lyon Correctional Facility =

Former prison in Colorado, United States

Coordinates: 38°05′06″N 103°08′34″W

Fort Lyon Correctional Facility was a facility in Bent County, Colorado, housing transgender inmates and inmates with medical conditions requiring constant care. Fort Lyon was decommissioned in 2012 and its inmates were transferred to LaVista Correctional Facility.
