= Bent County Correctional Facility =

American County Prison

- Interactive map of Bent County Correctional Facility
- Location: 11560 Road FF.75 Las Animas, Colorado; 38.066°N 103.201°W
- Status: medium
- Capacity: 1466
- Opened: 1996
- Managed by: CoreCivic

The Bent County Correctional Facility is a private medium-security prison for men located in Las Animas, Bent County, Colorado. The facility is owned and operated by CoreCivic under contract with the Colorado Department of Corrections and houses Colorado inmates.

CoreCivic has run the facility since 1996, and it has an official capacity of 1466 inmates. It was Colorado's first private prison.

== Notable Inmates ==
Inmate Name	Register Number	Status	Details
Scott Allen Ostrem	182499	Serving three life sentences without parole.	Perpetrator of the 2017 Thornton shooting in which he murdered three people at a Walmart.
