= Arkansas Valley Correctional Facility =

American men's state prison

Coordinates: 38°11′27″N 103°50′33″W

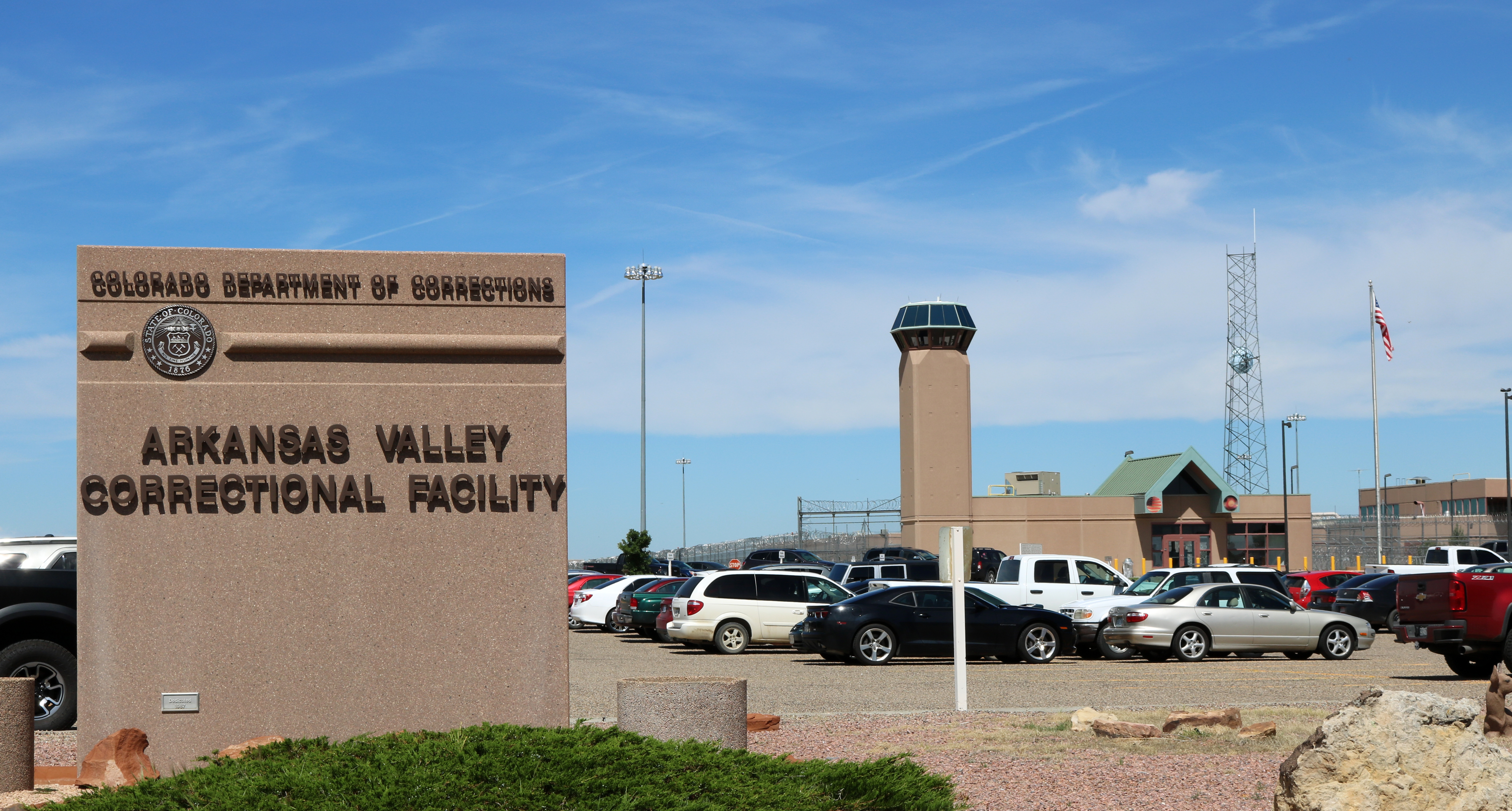
- A sign at the prison entrance.
- Interactive map of Arkansas Valley Correctional Facility
- Location: 12750 Highway 96 Ordway, Colorado
- Status: open
- Security class: mixed
- Capacity: 1007
- Opened: 1987
- Managed by: Colorado Department of Corrections

The Arkansas Valley Correctional Facility is a state prison for men located in Ordway, Crowley County, Colorado, owned and operated by the Colorado Department of Corrections. The facility opened in 1987 and houses a maximum of 1007 inmates at minimum, medium and high security levels.

== Notable Inmates ==
Inmate Name	Register Number	Status	Details
Steven Dana Pankey	195622	Serving a 20 years to life sentence; earliest parole date 2040.	Perpetrator of the kidnapping and murder of Jonelle Matthews
Rogel Lazaro Aguilera-Mederos	193007	Serving a 10 year sentence; earliest parole date 2026.	Perpetrator of the 2019 Lakewood semi-truck crash.
