= Sterling Correctional Facility =

Prison in Sterling, Colorado, United States

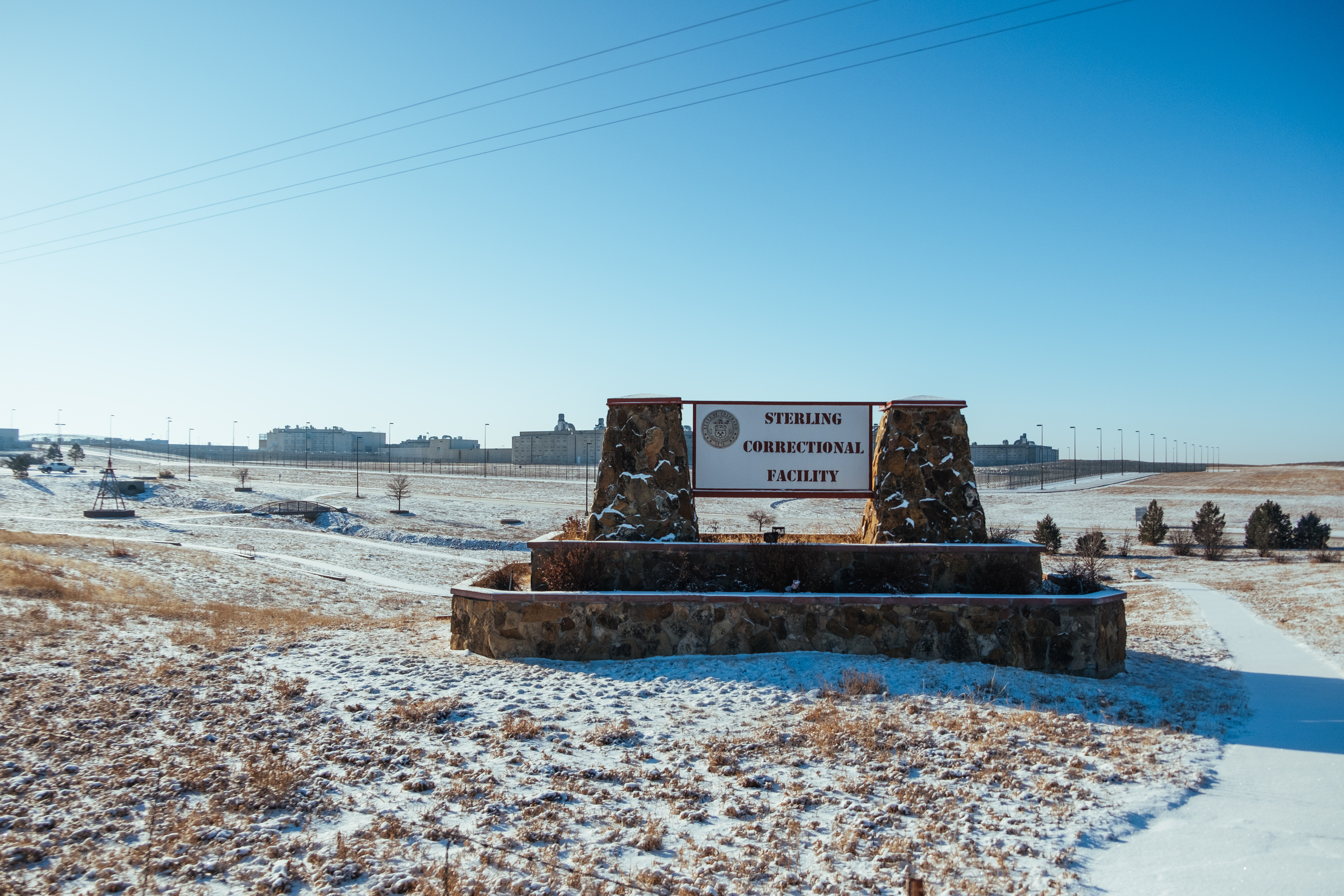
- Interactive map of Sterling Correctional Facility
- Location: Sterling, Colorado; 40.6115°N 103.1622°W
- Capacity: 2,585
- Managed by: Colorado Department of Corrections

Sterling Correctional Facility (SCF) is located in Sterling, Colorado, and is the largest prison in the Colorado Department of Corrections system.

== History ==
State statute dictated that prisoners with death sentences were to be held at the administrative segregation facility at the Colorado State Penitentiary. In 2011, the State of Colorado moved its death row prisoners to Sterling to settle a federal lawsuit filed by Nathan Dunlap, a death row inmate. Dunlap had complained about the state's lack of outdoor exercise facilities at Colorado State Penitentiary. The inmates returned to Colorado State Penitentiary in 2015 after the outdoor access issue was resolved.

The facility would become the source of a controversy for Veterans of Foreign Wars after the establishment of a post in the prison by inmates in October 2023. It would become subject to controversy following coverage by YouTuber Richard Hy in September 2025, which would result in the parent organization enacting new rules that forced the post to cease operations.

== Notable Inmates ==
- Allen Andrade, first conviction for a hate crime involving a transgender victim
- Troy Graves, serial rapist and murderer
- Scott Lee Kimball, serial killer imprisoned at Sterling until 2017 escape attempt
- Marc Patrick O’Leary, serial rapist
- Peter Cichuniec, former firefighter convicted in the death of Elijah McClain
