= Skyline Correctional Center =

Prison in Colorado, United States

Coordinates: 38°25′48.5″N 105°09′30″W

Skyline Correctional Facility
- Interactive map of Skyline Correctional Facility
- Location: 600 Evans Road Cañon City, Colorado
- Status: Closed
- Security class: Minimum
- Capacity: 249
- Opened: 1957
- Closed: 2021
- Managed by: Colorado Department of Corrections

The Skyline Correctional Center (also SCC) is a Level 1 minimum security prison facility at Cañon City in the state of Colorado. The Prison was opened in 1957 with 60 beds and houses (as for May 19, 2014) 126 male offenders. Inmates assigned to SCC are within 60 months of their parole eligibility date and in most cases have attended numerous treatment programs offered through the Colorado Department of Corrections.

In 1990 the Level I and II facilities located in the East Cañon Complex were combined under one administration and became known as the CMC (Cañon Minimum Centers). The SCC achieved its original American Correctional Association accreditation in 2002 and has maintained national accreditation since.

The Warden of this facility was Pamela Ploughe.

This facility was closed in January 2021. It has since reopened as The Beacon at Skyline, and operates as a Level 1 minimum security prison facility. The Beacon is focused now on self-improvement, and positive community.

The Beacon operates now with a "completely new organizational structure, mission, and philosophy," focusing on personal growth, and intending to shift the culture of corrections in a more positive light.
