= Centennial Correctional Facility =

Prison in Fremont County, Colorado

- Interactive map of Centennial Correctional Facility
- Location: Cañon City, Colorado; 38°26′15″N 105°09′09″W
- Status: Open
- Security class: Maximum
- Capacity: 604
- Opened: 1980
- Managed by: Colorado Department of Corrections

Centennial Correctional Facility (CCF) is a prison located in the East Canon complex in Fremont County, just east of Cañon City, Colorado. CCF consists of two separate buildings, North and South. The South facility, opened in 2011, is a Level V maximum security facility. All offenders in CCF South are in Administrative Segregation (AdSeg), also known as solitary confinement. CCF South is the counterpart of the Colorado State Penitentiary (CSP), also in the East Canon complex. The North facility is the original facility, and primarily houses Level IV maximum security offenders.

== Notable inmates ==
Inmate Name	Register Number	Status	Details
Devon Michael Erickson	192238	Serving two life sentences without parole.	One of two perpetrators of the 2019 STEM School Highlands Ranch shooting in which Erickson murdered student Kendrick Castillo after he tried to stop Devon.
Christopher Scarver	N/A	Serving three consecutive life sentences without parole.	Convicted murderer who later murdered Jesse Anderson and serial killer Jeffrey Dahmer.
