= Colorado Territorial Correctional Facility =

Medium security prison in Cañon City, Colorado

Coordinates: 38°26′12″N 105°14′54″W

- Interactive map of Colorado Territorial Correctional Facility
- Location: Cañon City, Colorado
- Status: Open
- Security class: Mixed
- Capacity: 900
- Opened: 1871
- Managed by: Colorado Department of Corrections

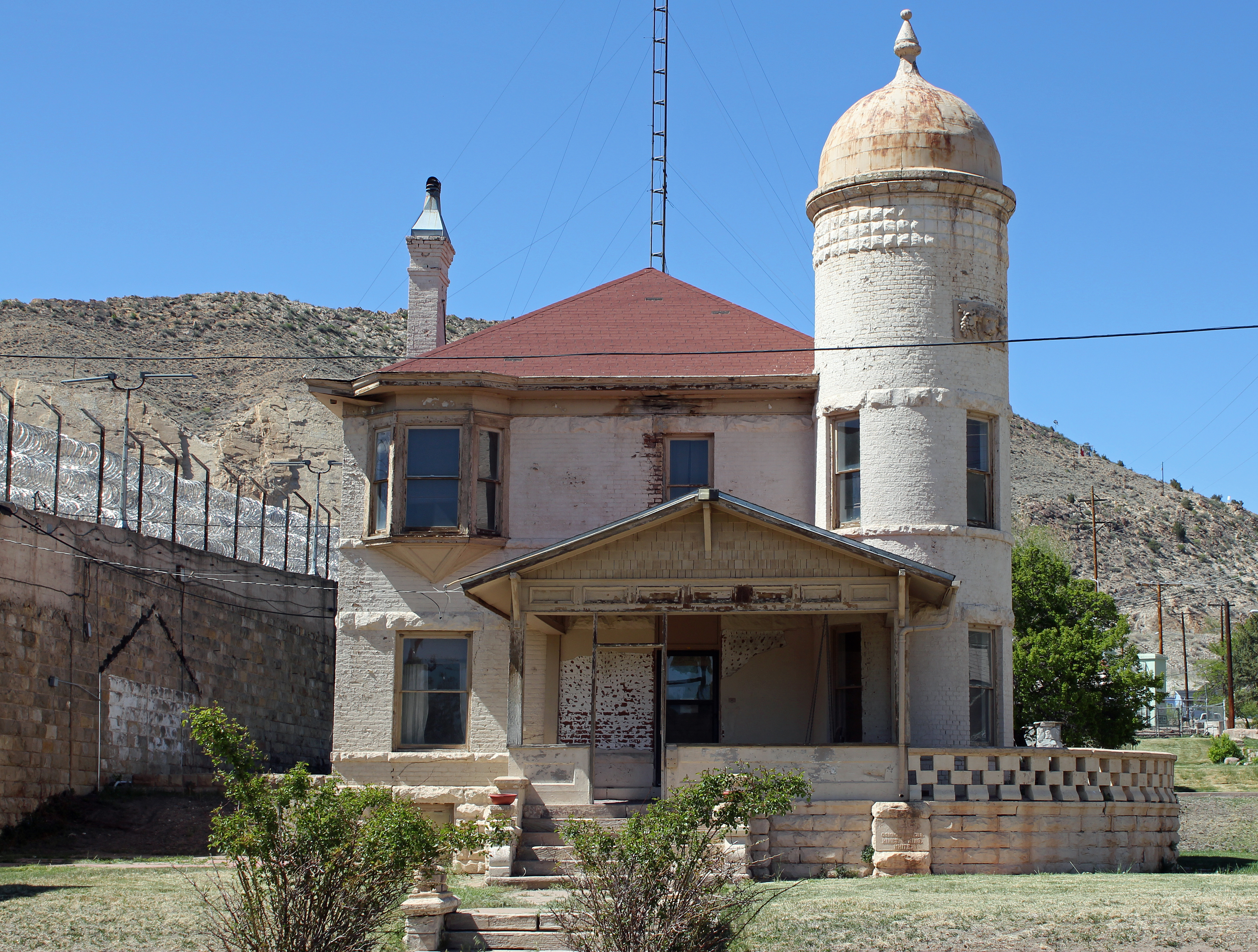
The Deputy Warden's House, on the grounds of the Colorado Territorial Correctional Facility, built in 1901 by prison labor

Colorado Territorial Correctional Facility (CTCF), colloquially known simply as "Territorial" and formerly known as the Colorado State Prison, is a medium security prison in Cañon City, Colorado. CTCF is the oldest prison in the Colorado DOC system. It was built in 1871 as a territorial prison and became a state prison in 1876. The Colorado DOC system only has two infirmaries, one of which is located in CTCF. The other is located in the Denver Reception & Diagnostic Center (DRDC).

From the 1890s until 1993, the Colorado death row and execution chamber was located at the Colorado Territorial Correctional Facility, but the last execution to take place there was in 1967. In 1993, the Colorado State Penitentiary opened, and death row moved there. As of 2012, the Sterling Correctional Facility housed Colorado's death row prisoners. Capital punishment was abolished in Colorado in 2020; although the law did not apply retroactively, the sentences of the three remaining inmates on death row were commuted to life in prison by governor Jared Polis.

== See also ==
- Canon City (film), a 1948 film about a 1947 prison break at the facility
