= Olney Springs, Colorado =

Town in Crowley County, Colorado, United States

- Town
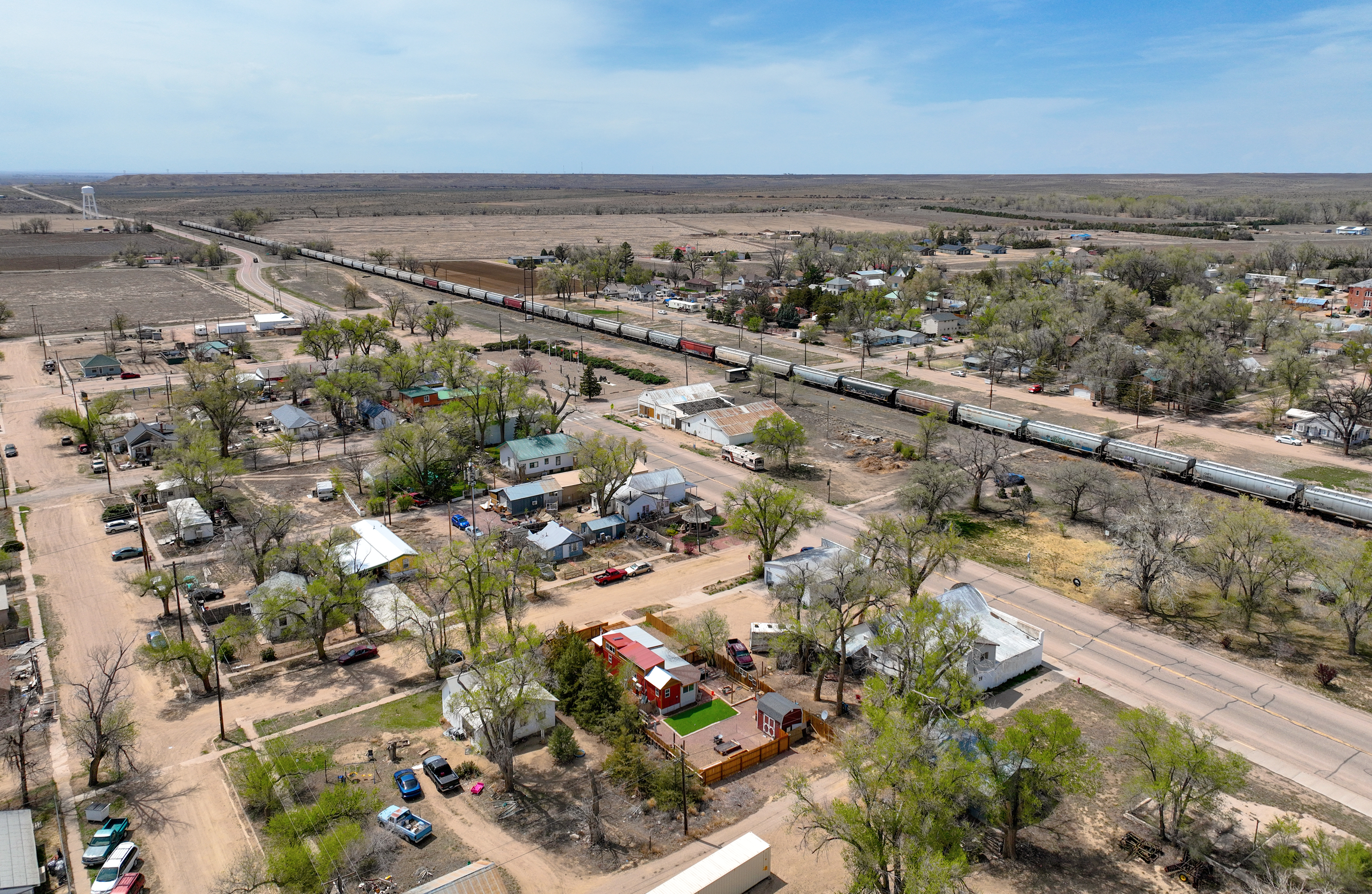
- Aerial view (2023)

- Location within Crowley County and Colorado
- Coordinates: 38°9′57″N 103°56′45″W
- Country: United States
- State: Colorado
- County: Crowley
- Incorporated: May 27, 1912

Area
  - Total: 0.24 sq mi (0.62 km^{2})
  - Land: 0.24 sq mi (0.62 km^{2})
  - Water: 0 sq mi (0.00 km^{2})
- Elevation: 4,383 ft (1,336 m)

Population (2020)
  - Total: 315
  - Density: 1,300/sq mi (510/km^{2})
- Time zone: UTC−7 (MST)
  - Summer (DST): UTC−6 (MDT)
- ZIP Code: 81062
- Area code: 719
- FIPS code: 08-55705
- GNIS ID: 195368
- Website: Town of Olney Springs

Olney Springs is a statutory town in Crowley County, Colorado, United States. The population was 315 at the 2020 census.

== History ==
A post office called Olney Springs has been in operation since 1909. The town was named after one Mr. Olney, a railroad official.

== Geography ==
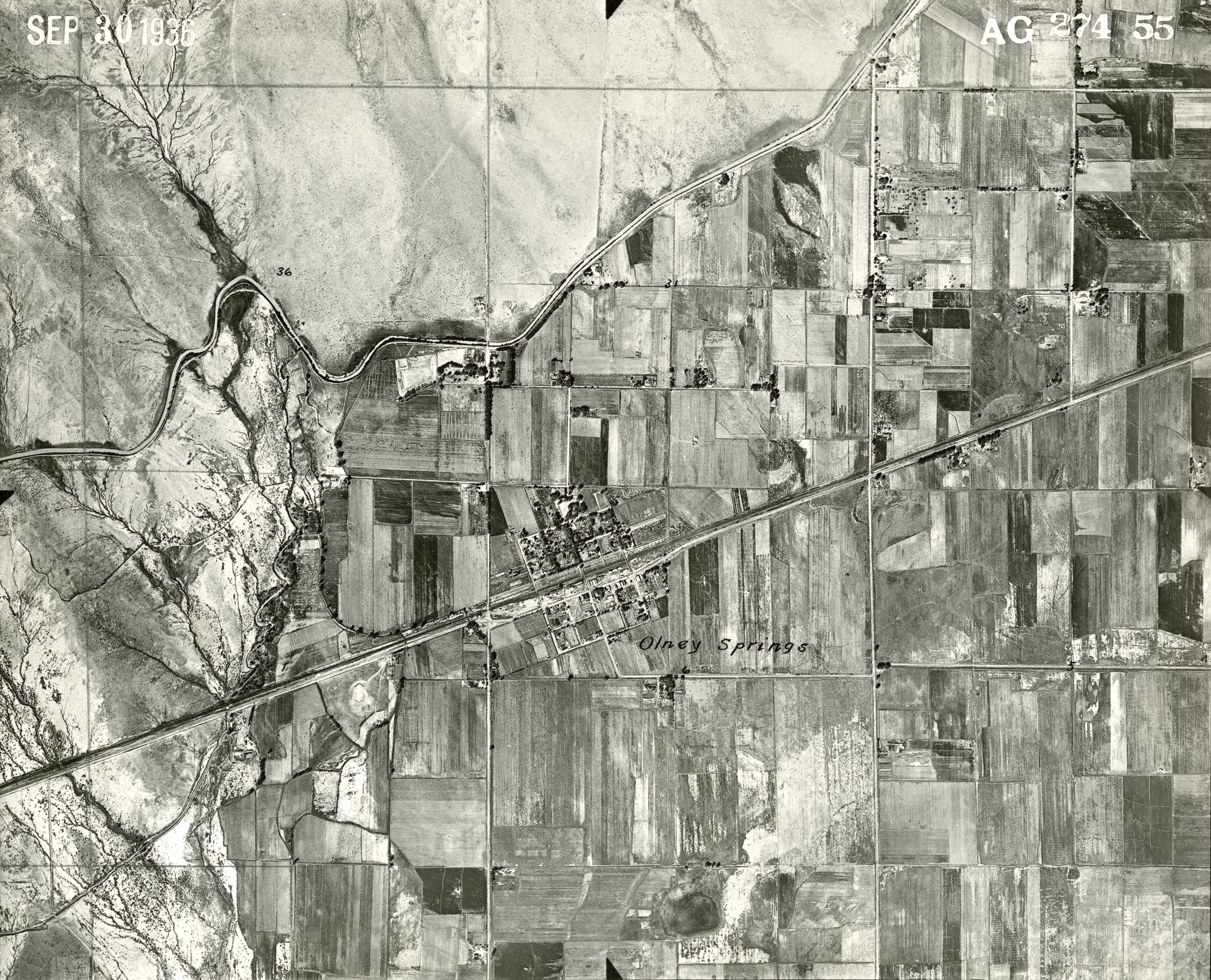
Olney Springs photographed from above in 1937 by the Soil Conservation Service.

Olney Springs is located in southwestern Crowley County. Colorado State Highway 96 leads east 11 miles (18 km) to Ordway, the county seat, and west 38 miles (61 km) to Pueblo.

According to the United States Census Bureau, the town has a total area of 0.2 square miles (0.52 km^{2}), all of it land.

Slightly west of the town is the Crowley County Correctional Facility, owned by the Corrections Corporation of America. It has 1,794 prisoners from various states. Built as a speculative venture in 1998, it had a massive riot in 1999 when operated by the now-defunct Community Services Corporation. The builder, Dominion Ventures, took over its management, and in January 2003 ownership and operation transferred to CCA. Another devastating riot took place on July 20, 2004, once again requiring massive intervention by local and state law enforcement and correctional personnel.

== Demographics ==
Historical population
Census	Pop.	Note	%±
1920	240		—
1930	228		−5.0%
1940	260		14.0%
1950	279		7.3%
1960	263		−5.7%
1970	264		0.4%
1980	253		−4.2%
1990	340		34.4%
2000	389		14.4%
2010	345		−11.3%
2020	315		−8.7%
U.S. Decennial Census

== See also ==
- List of municipalities in Colorado
