= Kit Carson Correctional Center =

Former prison in Colorado, United States

Coordinates: 39°18′11″N 102°14′42″W

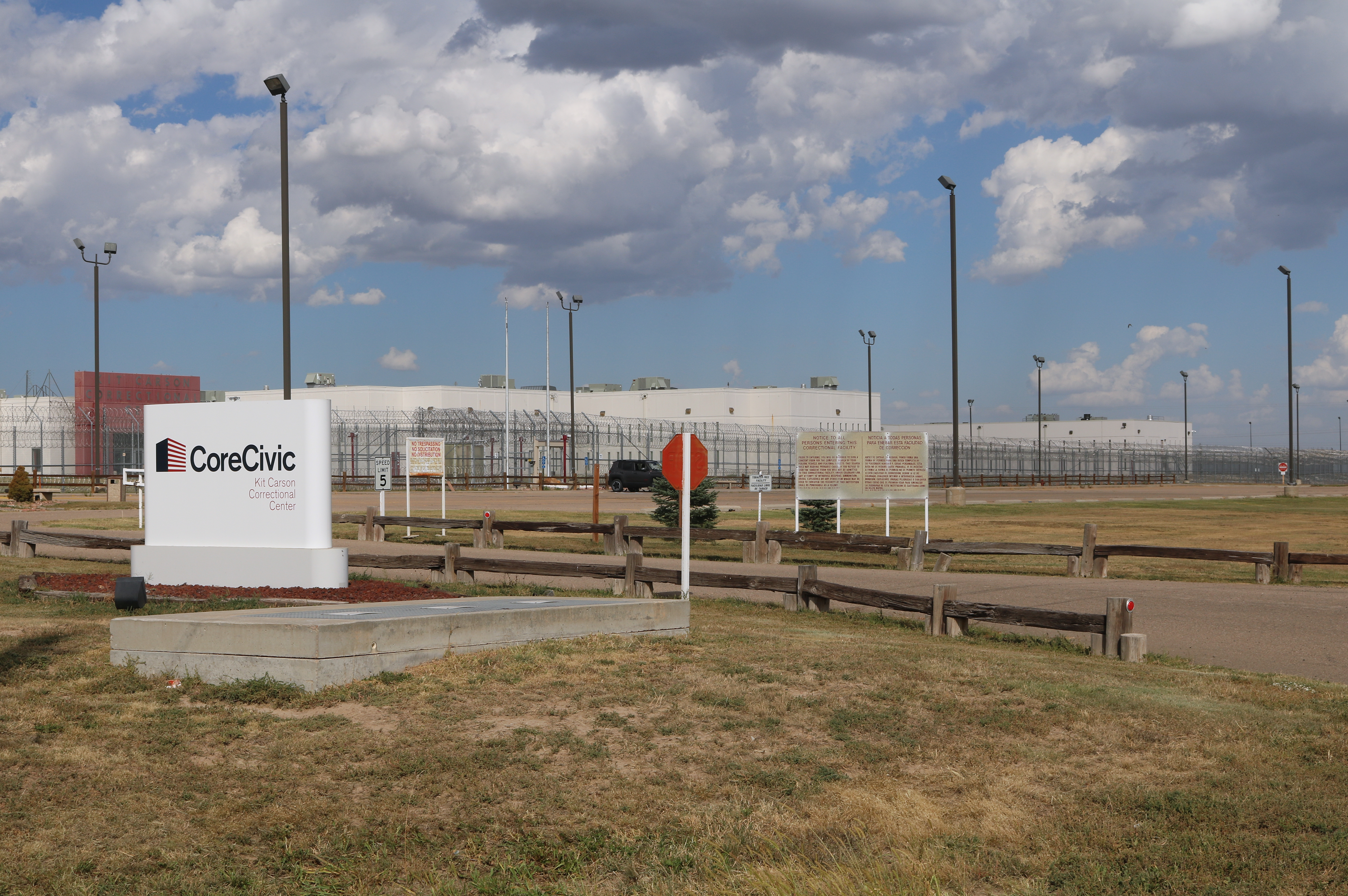
- The facility in 2019.
- Interactive map of Kit Carson Correctional Center
- Location: 49777 Co Rd V Burlington, Colorado
- Status: closed
- Security class: medium
- Capacity: 1488
- Opened: 1998
- Closed: 2016
- Managed by: CoreCivic

The Kit Carson Correctional Center was a privately owned, medium-security state prison for men located in Burlington, Kit Carson County, Colorado, owned and operated by the CoreCivic. The facility housed a maximum capacity of 1488 inmates.

As of April 2016, the facility, with only 580 inmates and a declining population, became the subject of state budget negotiations. In June 2016 the state announced that it would not extend its contract for this facility past the end of July, effectively closing the prison with the loss of 142 local jobs.
