= List of people executed in Colorado =

The following is a list of people executed in the U.S. state of Colorado.

== 1876–1889 ==
Name	Race	Age	Date of execution	County	Crime	Victim(s)	Governor
James Miller	Mixed (Note: Mulatto.)	23	February 2, 1877	Bent	Murder	James Sutherland, white	John Long Routt
Victor Nunez	Hispanic	57	March 14, 1879	Arapahoe	Murder	Luis Rascone, Hispanic	Frederick Walker Pitkin
Cicero Simms	White	19	July 23, 1880	Park	Murder	John Johnson, white	Frederick Walker Pitkin
W. H. Salisbury	White	33	July 17, 1881	El Paso (Note: Change of venue from Chaffee County.)	Murder	Thomas L. Perkins, white	Frederick Walker Pitkin
Merrick Rosengrants	White		July 29, 1881	Lake	Murder-Burglary	John Langmeyer, white	Frederick Walker Pitkin
Frank Gilbert	White	30	July 29, 1881	Lake	Murder	James McCollum, white	Frederick Walker Pitkin
Thomas Coleman	Black	27	December 16, 1881	Gunnison	Murder	Albert Smith, black	Frederick Walker Pitkin
George Woods	White	34	June 23, 1882	La Plata	Murder	M. G. Buchanan, white	Frederick Walker Pitkin
Miguel Garcia	Hispanic	54	December 20, 1884	Pueblo (Note: Change of venue from Bent County.)	Murder-Robbery	Dennis Wilkes, white	James Benton Grant
Charles Hibbard	White		April 24, 1885	Las Animas	Murder-Robbery	William Knowles, white (Note: Also confessed to at least one other murder.)	Benjamin Harrison Eaton
Marshall Clements	White		December 3, 1885	Saguache	Murder	Thomas and Susie Clements, white (brother and sister-in-law)	Benjamin Harrison Eaton
Cyrus Minnich	White	39	February 5, 1886	Lake	Murder-Robbery	Samuel Baldwin, white	Benjamin Harrison Eaton
Andrew Green	Black	25	July 27, 1886	Arapahoe	Murder-Robbery	Joseph C. Whitnah, white	Benjamin Harrison Eaton
Nocollo Fimenello	White		August 25, 1888	Chaffee	Murder	William Casey, white	Alva Adams
Jose Ortez	Hispanic		July 16, 1889	Conejos	Murder-Robbery	C. E. LeDuc, white	Job Adams Cooper

== 1890–1997 ==
In 1890, a new law was passed which centralized executions at the state penitentiary, and forbid the press from publishing accounts of executions. Rather than installing a traditional gallows, the penitentiary used a mechanized device which executed prisoners by pulling them upwards rather than by falling. During this period, capital punishment was abolished from 1897 to 1901. In 1933, hanging was officially replaced with gas asphyxiation, with the state constructing its new gas chamber at the state penitentiary by January 1934. After the Gregg v. Georgia ruling in 1976 which restored capital punishment, gas asphyxiation was replaced with lethal injection in 1988. Colorado only executed a single prisoner by lethal injection. Colorado eventually abolished capital punishment in 2020.

Name	Race	Age	Date of execution	County or City	Crime	Victim(s)	Governor
Noverto Griego	Hispanic		November 8, 1890	Las Animas	Murder-Robbery	W. L. Underwood, white	Job Adams Cooper
James T. Joyce	White	33	January 17, 1891	Arapahoe	Murder	John Snooks, 20, white (Note: Also believed to have committed a previous murder in Kentucky.)	John Long Routt
William C. Davis	Black	26	September 22, 1891	Pueblo	Murder	Carrie Armsby (foster mother) and James Arnold, mixed and white (Note: Armsby was a mulatta.)	John Long Routt
Charles Smith	Black	30	December 14, 1891	Huerfano	Murder	Taylor Sillman, black (girlfriend's husband)	John Long Routt
Thomas Lawton	White	24	May 6, 1892	El Paso	Murder-Robbery	John A. Hemming, white	John Long Routt
Thomas Jordan	White	29	May 11, 1895	Arapahoe	Murder	August Sisin, white	Albert McIntire
Peter Augusta	White	47	May 11, 1895	Arapahoe	Murder	Harry Sullivan, white	Albert McIntire
Abe Taylor	White	32	December 13, 1895	Conejos	Murder	Charles H. Emerson, white (police officer)	Albert McIntire
Benjamin Ratcliff	White		February 7, 1896	Chaffee	Murder	Three people, white (Note: George Douglas Wyatt, Samuel Taylor, and L. F. McCurdy.)	Albert McIntire
William Holt	White	21	June 26, 1896	Las Animas	Murder	John Solomon, white (police officer)	Albert McIntire
Albert Noble	White		June 26, 1896	Las Animas	Murder	John Solomon, white (police officer)	Albert McIntire
Deonecio Romero	Hispanic		June 26, 1896	Las Animas	Murder	John Solomon, white (police officer)	Albert McIntire
Azel Galbraith	White		March 6, 1905	Gilpin	Murder	Female and male, 8 (male), white (wife and son)	Alva Adams
Fred Arnold	White	20	June 16, 1905	City of Denver	Murder-Robbery	Amanda Youngblood, 63, white	Jesse Fuller McDonald
Newton Andrews	White	21	June 16, 1905	City of Denver	Murder-Robbery	Amanda Youngblood, 63, white	Jesse Fuller McDonald
Joseph Johnson	White		September 13, 1905	Las Animas	Murder	John H. Fox, white	Jesse Fuller McDonald
John McGarvey	White	25	January 12, 1907	Mesa	Murder	Edward Innes, 28, white (jailer)	Henry Augustus Buchtel
Giuseppe Alia	White	56	July 15, 1908	City of Denver	Murder	Leo Heinrichs, 40, white	Henry Augustus Buchtel
James Lynn	Black	50	October 8, 1908	Pueblo	Murder	Sarah James, 16, white	Henry Augustus Buchtel
Lewis Wechter	White	29	August 31, 1912	City of Denver	Murder-Robbery	W. Clifford Burrowes, white	John F. Shafroth
Harry E. Hillen	White	24	June 24, 1915	City of Denver	Murder-Robbery	Thomas Chase, white	George Alfred Carlson
George Quinn	White	31	January 28, 1916	City of Denver	Murder	William Herbertson, 36, white (girlfriend's husband)	George Alfred Carlson
Oscar Cook	White		February 26, 1916	City of Denver	Murder-Robbery	Andrew J. Loyd and William McPherson (police officer), white	George Alfred Carlson
George Bosko	White	29	December 10, 1920	Pueblo	Murder-Robbery	Elton C. Parks and William T. Hunter, white	Oliver Henry Shoup
Daniel Borich	White	51	August 18, 1922	Routt	Murder	Milla Borich (wife) and Joseph Kezele, white	Oliver Henry Shoup
Joe McGonigal	White	42	April 26, 1924	Las Animas	Murder	Ella Centers (girlfriend) and Wilbur N. Ferguson, white	William Ellery Sweet
Ray F. Shank	White	56	September 18, 1926	City of Denver	Murder	Marion and Paul Shank, 19 (Paul), white (wife and son)	Clarence Morley
Antonio Casias	Hispanic		November 12, 1926	Rio Grande	Murder	Carmen Barela, Hispanic	Clarence Morley
Arthur Osborn	White	22	March 30, 1928	Grand	Murder-Robbery	Fred N. Selak, 65, white	Billy Adams
Jasper R. Noakes	White	20	March 30, 1928	Grand	Murder-Robbery	Fred N. Selak, 65, white	Billy Adams
Edward Ives	White	44	January 10, 1930	City of Denver	Murder	Harry R. Ohle, white (police officer)	Billy Adams
Harold I. Weiss	White	26	May 28, 1930	City of Denver	Murder	Female, white (wife)	Billy Adams
Ralph E. Fleagle	White		July 10, 1930	Prowers	Murder-Robbery	A. N. Parrish, white (Note: Also later murdered Dr. W. W. Wineinger and E. A. Kissinger.)	Billy Adams
Howard L. Royston	White		July 18, 1930	Prowers	Murder-Robbery	A. N. Parrish, white	Billy Adams
George J. Abshier	White		July 18, 1930	Prowers	Murder-Robbery	A. N. Parrish, white	Billy Adams
Amalio Herrera	Hispanic	21	August 20, 1930	City of Denver	Murder	Maria Herrera, Hispanic (wife)	Billy Adams
William Moya	Hispanic	30	December 12, 1930	City of Denver	Murder-Robbery	Joseph Zemp, 80, white	Billy Adams
Claude Ray	White	25	January 30, 1931	Kiowa	Murder	Coral A. Hickman, white (deputy sheriff)	Billy Adams
John Walker	White	42	January 30, 1931	Kiowa	Murder	Coral A. Hickman, white (deputy sheriff)	Billy Adams
Andrew Halliday	White	23	January 30, 1931	Kiowa	Murder	Coral A. Hickman, white (deputy sheriff)	Billy Adams
James V. Foster	White	49	December 11, 1931	Weld	Murder	Four people, white (Note: His wife Myrtle and their daughters Darlene, Geraldine, and Mildred.)	Billy Adams
E. J. Farmer	White		March 18, 1932	Moffat	Murder	Earl Hopkins, white (Note: Also murdered Joe J. Jones during the same crime.)	Billy Adams
Joe Meastas	Mixed (Note: Half Mexican and half Navajo.)	25	May 27, 1932	Costilla	Murder	Benjamin Addis, white	Billy Adams
Nelwelt Moss	Black	20	March 10, 1933	Gunnison	Murder	Rena Schierenback, 79, white	Edwin C. Johnson
Walter Jones	White	23	December 1, 1933	Mesa	Murder-Robbery	Hartford Johnson, 35, white	Edwin C. Johnson
William C. Kelly	White	30	June 22, 1934	Delta	Murder-Robbery	Russell Downing, 53, white	Edwin C. Johnson
Louis Pacheco	Hispanic	37	May 31, 1935	Weld	Murder	Robert Griffin, 16, white	Edwin C. Johnson
John Pacheco	Hispanic	24	May 31, 1935	Weld	Murder	Robert Griffin, 16, white	Edwin C. Johnson
Leonard Belongia	White	24	June 21, 1935	Weld	Murder	Albert E. Oesterick, white	Edwin C. Johnson
Otis McDaniel	White	31	February 14, 1936	San Miguel (Note: Change of venue from Montezuma County.)	Murder	W. W. Dunlap, white (deputy sheriff)	Edwin C. Johnson
Frank Aguilar	Hispanic	34	August 13, 1937	Pueblo	Murder-Rape	Dorothy Drain, 15, white (Note: Aguilar had previously murdered an elderly white woman, Sally Crumpley.) (Note: Arridy's conviction was highly questioned at the time, and he was granted a posthumous pardon in 2011.)	Teller Ammons
Joe Arridy	Arab	23	January 6, 1939	Pueblo	Murder-Rape	Dorothy Drain, 15, white	Teller Ammons
Pete Catalina	White	41	September 29, 1939	Chaffee	Murder	John Trujillo, 23, Hispanic	Ralph Lawrence Carr
Angelo Agnes	Black	31	September 29, 1939	City of Denver	Murder	Melinda Agnes, black (wife)	Ralph Lawrence Carr
Harry Leopold	White	29	December 9, 1939	City of Denver	Murder-Robbery	Emil Albrecht, 61, white	Ralph Lawrence Carr
Joe Coates	Black	63	January 10, 1941	City of Denver	Murder	Frank Renovato, white (detective)	Ralph Lawrence Carr
James Stephens	White	76	June 20, 1941	Montezuma	Murder	Lynn Dean, white (Mancos town marshal)	Ralph Lawrence Carr
Martin Sukle	White	38	May 22, 1942	El Paso	Murder	Marie Essex Sukle (wife) and Jack Russell, 23 (wife), white	Ralph Lawrence Carr
Donald H. Fearn	White	23	October 23, 1942	Pueblo	Murder-Rape-Kidnap	Alice Porter, 16, white	John Charles Vivian
John Sullivan	White	43	September 20, 1943	El Paso	Murder-Rape-Burglary	Carrie Winona Culbertson, white	John Charles Vivian
George Honda	Asian		October 8, 1943	City of Denver	Murder	Mary Honda, Asian (wife)	John Charles Vivian
Howard C. Potts	White	41	June 22, 1945	City of Denver	Murder	Mary Theresa Potts, white (wife)	John Charles Vivian
Charles F. Silliman	White	35	November 9, 1945	Arapahoe	Murder	Esther and Patricia Silliman, 4 (Patricia), white (wife and daughter)	John Charles Vivian
Frank H. Martz	White	35	November 23, 1945	Arapahoe	Murder-Rape-Kidnap	Kathleen Ann Geist, 3, white	John Charles Vivian
John H. Brown	Mixed (Note: Half Black and half Native American.)	50	May 23, 1947	City of Denver	Murder	Evelyn Smith, 27, black	William Lee Knous
Harold Gillette	White	31	June 20, 1947	Larimer	Murder	Glen D. Cook, white	William Lee Knous
Robert S. Battalino	White	39	January 7, 1949	Jefferson	Murder-Robbery-Kidnap	Michael H. Randolph, white	William Lee Knous
Paul F. Schneider	White	24	December 16, 1949	Washington	Murder-Robbery-Kidnap	Frank J. Ford, 47, white (Note: Serial killer, later murdered James R. Hall and Donald Dussean (21 and 28, white) near Detroit.)	William Lee Knous
John Berger Jr.	White	34	January 26, 1951	City of Denver	Murder	Pauline Berger, white (wife)	Daniel I. J. Thornton
Besalirez Martinez	Hispanic	42	September 7, 1956	Eagle	Murder	Perfecto Cruz, Hispanic	Edwin C. Johnson
John Gilbert Graham	White	23	January 11, 1957	City of Denver	Murder	Daisie E. King, white (mother) (Note: 43 other people were murdered during the crime, the bombing of United Air Lines Flight 629.)	Stephen McNichols
LeeRoy A. Leick	White	30	January 22, 1960	City of Denver	Murder	Evelyn Leick, white (wife)	Stephen McNichols
David F. Early	White	28	August 11, 1961	Arapahoe	Murder-Burglary	Regina Knight, white (Note: Also murdered Regina's husband Merrill and their 15-year-old daughter Karen during the same crime.)	Stephen McNichols
Harold David Wooley	White	36	March 9, 1962	Jefferson	Murder-Robbery	William Scott Wright, 37, white	Stephen McNichols
Walter D. Hammill	White	31	May 25, 1962	City of Denver	Murder (Note: Victim sexually assaulted before being murdered.)	Lester Gordon Brown Jr., 11, white	Stephen McNichols
John Bizup Jr.	White	26	August 14, 1964	Pueblo	Murder-Robbery	Roy Don Bussey, white	John A. Love
Luis Monge	Hispanic	48	June 2, 1967 (Note: Last execution in the United States before Furman v. Georgia.)	City of Denver	Murder	Leonarda Monge, Hispanic (wife) (Note: Also murdered three of their children, Alan (6), Vincent (4), and Teresa (11 months).)	John A. Love
Gary Lee Davis	White	53	October 13, 1997	Adams	Murder-Rape-Kidnap	Virginia May, 34, white	Roy Romer

== See also ==
- Capital punishment in Colorado
- Crime in Colorado
