= Capital punishment in Colorado =

Capital punishment in Colorado was abolished in 2020. It was legal from 1974 until 2020 prior to it being abolished in all future cases.

It was reinstated in 1974 by popular vote, with 61% in favor of the measure that was referred to the voters by the state legislature.

In March 2020, the Colorado Legislature passed a bill to repeal the death penalty for individuals for crimes committed after July 1, 2020. The bill was signed by the governor of Colorado on March 23, 2020. The law is not retroactive, including to the three inmates who were then housed on death row, but these sentences were commuted to life imprisonment by governor Jared Polis.

Only one inmate, Gary Lee Davis, has been executed in Colorado since the 1970s. Another man, Stephen Morin, received a death sentence in Colorado, but was executed in Texas for separate murders.

== History ==
=== Pre-Furman history ===
The history of Colorado’s death penalty is somewhat unusual as it was one of the first states to repudiate the death penalty by abolishing it in 1897 only to restore it once more in 1901 due to a number of lynchings that had occurred. In total, 101 people were executed in Colorado in the period before Furman v. Georgia (Note: Furman v. Georgia, 408 U.S. 238 (1972) was a criminal case in which the United States Supreme Court struck down all death penalty schemes in the United States in a 5–4 decision, with each member of the majority writing a separate opinion. Following Furman, in order to reinstate the death penalty, states had to at least remove arbitrary and discriminatory effects, to satisfy the Eighth Amendment to the United States Constitution.) (1859–1972). Eleven of these executions were prior to statehood; 90 since. All were executed as punishment for murder and all were male.

Hanging was the sole method of execution until it was replaced by gas inhalation in 1934. There were 69 hangings and 32 gassings.

Colorado is notable for being the last state to make use of lethal gas prior to the 1972 Supreme Court decision that effectively abolished capital punishment in the United States. Colorado also performed the last pre-Furman execution in 1967. Oklahoma performed the last pre-Furman electrocution in 1966.

Kansas performed the last pre-Furman hanging in 1965 (It was also the last non-voluntary execution before Furman). Utah performed the last pre-Furman execution of a death sentence by firing squad in 1960 (and coincidentally, the first post-Furman execution by firing squad in 1977).

=== Abolishment ===
On January 14, 2020, Senate Bill 20-100 was introduced in the Colorado Senate with prime sponsors being Senators Julie Gonzales and Jack Tate as well as Representatives Jeni James Arndt and Adrienne Benavidez. The bill abolished the death penalty for individuals sentenced after July 1, 2020, and was not retrospective to the three inmates on death row at the time, however, the Governor Jared Polis said "If the state, Republicans and Democrats, were to say, and I were to sign, a bill that said we no longer have the death penalty in Colorado … I would certainly take that as a strong indication that those who are currently on death row should have their sentences commuted to life in prison," On January 31, 2020, the Colorado Senate voted 19–13 on the bill's final reading to pass it and advance it to the Colorado House of Representatives.

On February 26, 2020, the Colorado House of Representatives voted 38–27 on final reading to pass it and send it to the governor's desk. The bill was signed on March 23, 2020.

== Sentencing ==
When the prosecution sought the death penalty, the sentence was decided by the jury and required unanimity. In case of a hung jury during the penalty phase of the trial, a life sentence was issued, even if a single juror opposed death (there was no retrial).

From 1995 to 2003, death sentences in Colorado were decided by a three-judge panel. Three people (George Woldt; Francisco Martinez, Jr.; and William Lee Neal) were sentenced to death under this system until it was overturned following Ring v. Arizona, retroactively commuting the death sentences to life without parole.

== Capital crimes ==
Before July 1, 2020, first-degree murder was punishable by death in Colorado if any of the following applied:

1. it was committed by a person under sentence of imprisonment for a class 1, 2, or 3 felony;
2. the defendant was previously convicted of a class 1 or 2 felony involving violence;
3. the defendant knowingly killed a law officer, elected officer, judicial officer or firefighter, while the person was engaged in the course of the performance of the person's duties or because of them;
4. the defendant killed a person kidnapped or held as a hostage by him or by anyone associated with him;
5. the defendant had been a party to an agreement to kill another person in furtherance of which a person was intentionally killed;
6. it was committed while lying in wait, from ambush, or by use of an explosive or incendiary device or a chemical, biological, or radiological weapon;
7. the defendant committed a class 1, 2, or 3 felony and, in the course of or in furtherance of such or immediate flight therefrom, the defendant intentionally caused the death of a person other than one of the participants;
8. it was committed for pecuniary gain;
9. the defendant knowingly created a grave risk of death to another person in addition to the victim of the offense;
10. it was committed in an especially heinous, cruel, or depraved manner;
11. the murder was committed for the purpose of avoiding or preventing a lawful arrest or prosecution or effecting an escape from custody, including killing of a witness to a criminal offense;
12. the defendant unlawfully and intentionally, knowingly, or with universal malice manifesting extreme indifference to the value of human life generally, killed two or more persons during the commission of the same criminal episode;
13. the victim was a child under 12 years of age;
14. the murder was committed because of the victim's race, color, ancestry, religion, or national origin;
15. the defendant's possession of the weapon used to commit the class 1 felony constituted a felony offense under Colorado or federal law;
16. the defendant intentionally killed more than one person in more than one criminal episode;
17. the defendant knowingly killed a pregnant woman.

Colorado statute books had still provided the death penalty for first-degree kidnapping and aggravated assault by an escaping capital felon, but this had been ruled unconstitutional in the 2008 U.S. Supreme Court case Kennedy v. Louisiana.

== Clemency ==
The governor of Colorado has the sole right to pardon or commute the death sentence. As of 2011, no gubernatorial commutation of a living prisoner had been granted in Colorado. However, on March 23, 2020, the three men who were awaiting execution had their death sentences commuted to life in prison by Governor Jared Polis on the same day that Polis had signed into law a bill repealing capital punishment.

On January 7, 2011, Colorado governor Bill Ritter granted a full and unconditional posthumous pardon to Joe Arridy, who had been convicted and executed as an accomplice to a murder that occurred in 1936. The pardon came 72 years after Arridy's execution and was the first such pardon in Colorado history. A press release from the governor's office stated, "[A]n overwhelming body of evidence indicates the 23-year-old Arridy was innocent, including false and coerced confessions, the likelihood that Arridy was not in Pueblo at the time of the killing, and an admission of guilt by someone else."

The governor pointed to Arridy's IQ of 46. The governor said, "Granting a posthumous pardon is an extraordinary remedy. But the tragic conviction of Mr. Arridy and his subsequent execution on January 6, 1939, merit such relief based on the great likelihood that Mr. Arridy was, in fact, innocent of the crime for which he was executed, and his severe mental disability at the time of his trial and execution. Pardoning Mr. Arridy cannot undo this tragic event in Colorado history. It is in the interests of justice and simple decency, however, to restore his good name."

On May 22, 2013, Colorado governor John Hickenlooper said it was unlikely he would ever allow the execution of convicted killer Nathan Dunlap. Hickenlooper granted Dunlap an indefinite reprieve, citing doubts about the fairness of capital punishment in Colorado.

== Method of executions ==
Lethal injection was the only permitted method of execution in Colorado, although the state previously used hanging and the gas chamber.

== Former death row ==
Colorado's death row had been located in Colorado State Penitentiary.

As of March 23, 2020, three people had been awaiting execution:

1. Nathan Dunlap, convicted and sentenced to death for murdering four people at a Chuck E. Cheese's restaurant in 1993;
2. Mario Owens, who was convicted and received a jury's death determination in 2008 for the murder of a young couple, Javad Marshall-Fields and his fiancée, Vivian Wolfe, both prosecution witnesses in a murder trial involving Owens; and
3. Robert Ray, who ordered the murders of Marshall-Fields and Wolfe while awaiting his own trial for murder.

However, on March 23, 2020, Governor Jared Polis commuted the sentences of these three men to life in prison without parole.

== Notable executions ==
Name	Age	Race	Date of execution	Victim	Method	Under Governor
Ray Noakes	22	White	March 30, 1928	Fred N. Selak, 61, white (Note: Co–conspirators in the murder of The Hermit of Grand Lake.)	Hanging	William Herbert Adams
Arthur Osborn	22	White	March 30, 1928	Fred N. Selak, 61, white	Hanging	William Herbert Adams
Joe Arridy	23	Arab	January 6, 1939	Dorothy Elizabeth Drain, 15, white (Note: Wrongfully executed. Arridy was severely intellectually disabled, having the mind and behavior of a 6-year-old. The actual killer of Dorothy Drain, Frank Aguilar, later said he acted alone and was executed on August 13, 1937. Arridy was posthumously pardoned in 2011.)	Gas chamber	Teller Ammons
Jack Gilbert Graham	24	White	January 11, 1957	Daisie Eldora King, 53, white (his mother) (Note: Killed 44 people by placing a bomb aboard United Airlines Flight 629.)	Gas chamber	Stephen McNichols
Luis Monge	48	Hispanic	June 2, 1967 (Note: Last person executed in the United States prior to *Furman v. Georgia*.)	Four people, Hispanic (Note: His pregnant wife Leonarda Monge, 44, and three of their children, Alan, 6, Vincent, 4, and Teresa, 11 months.)	Gas chamber	John Arthur Love
Gary Lee Davis	53	White	October 13, 1997	Virginia May, 34, white	Lethal injection	Roy R. Romer

== See also ==
- List of death row inmates in the United States § Colorado
- Crime in Colorado
- Law of Colorado
