= Canadian Pacific Air Lines Flight 108 =

1949 in-flight bombing of passenger airplane

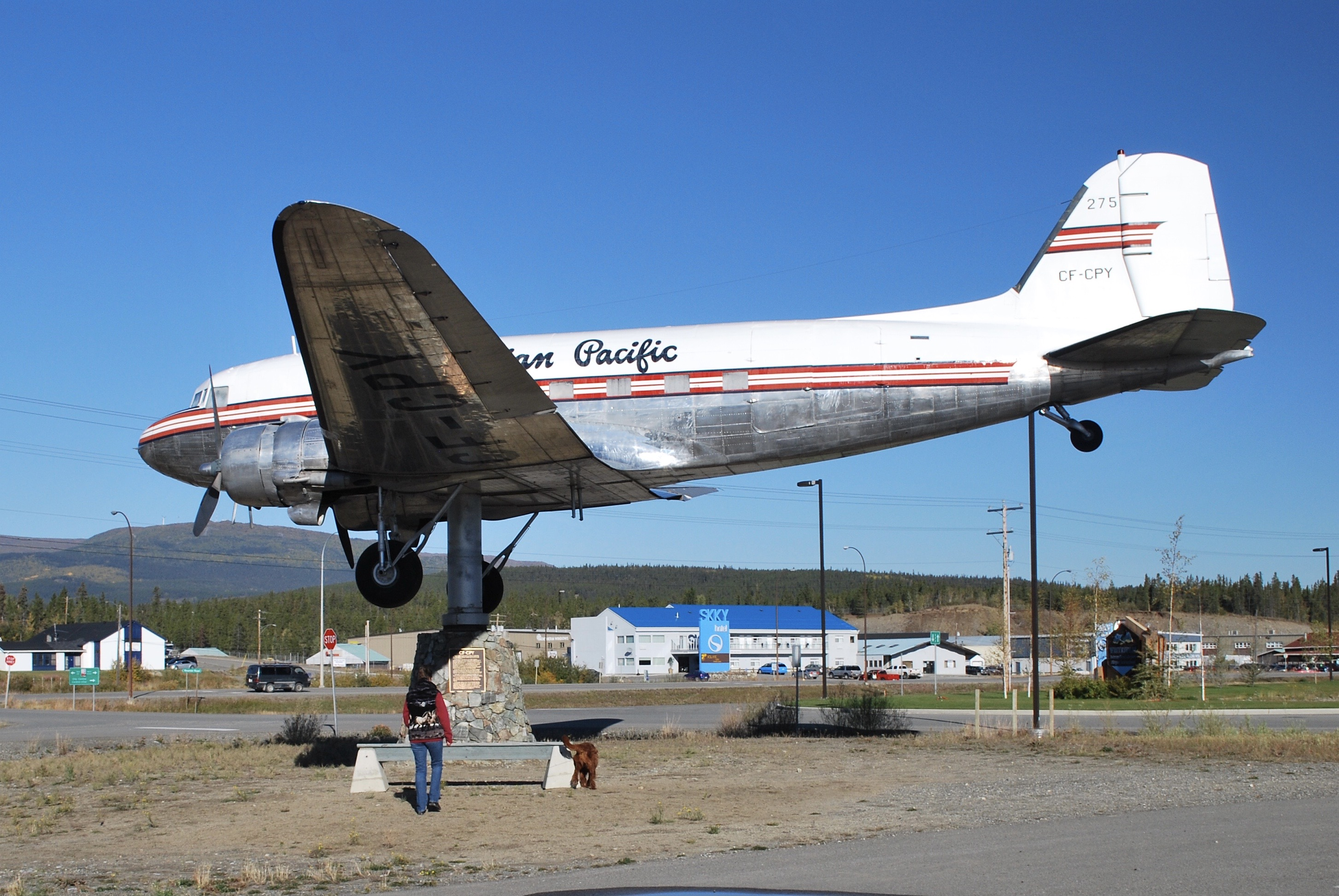
- A DC-3 in Canadian Pacific livery, similar to the aircraft involved

Bombing
- Date: 9 September 1949
- Summary: In-flight bombing
- Site: over Cap Tourmente near Sault-au-Cochon Quebec, Canada

Aircraft
- Aircraft type: Douglas DC-3
- Operator: Canadian Pacific Air Lines
- Registration: CF-CUA
- Flight origin: Montreal, Quebec
- Last stopover: L'Ancienne-Lorette; Quebec City, Quebec
- Destination: Baie-Comeau, Quebec
- Occupants: 23
- Passengers: 19
- Crew: 4
- Fatalities: 23
- Survivors: 0

Joseph-Albert Guay

Généreux Ruest

Marguerite Pitre

Canadian Pacific Air Lines Flight 108, known as the Sault-au-Cochon Tragedy, was a Douglas DC-3 operated by Canadian Pacific Air Lines (registry CF-CUA S/N: 4518) that was blown up by a dynamite time bomb on 9 September 1949. The plane was flying from Montreal to Baie-Comeau, Quebec, with a stopover at Quebec City, when it was destroyed. All 19 passengers and 4 crew members were killed in the explosion and crash. The bombing was the first instance of an airliner bombing being conclusively solved.

A five-minute delay resulted in the plane crashing on land instead of water, allowing vital evidence to be uncovered. Investigators discovered that three people, Joseph-Albert Guay (22 September 1917 – 12 January 1951), Généreux Ruest (1898 – 25 July 1952), and Marguerite Pitre (5 September 1908 – 9 January 1953), had conspired to destroy the plane to obtain life insurance money. Guay had wanted to kill his wife, who was a passenger, so he could marry his mistress. The case was solved after Pitre confessed, implicating Guay but not herself or her brother Généreux Ruest. However, Guay later sent an extremely detailed 40-page confession revealing the complicity of his two accomplices to Premier of Quebec Maurice Duplessis. Guay, Ruest, and Pitre were tried for murder, found guilty, and executed.

== Background ==
Joseph-Albert Guay was born the youngest of five children on 22 September 1917 in Charny, Quebec. His father was killed in a railway accident when he was aged 5 and the family moved to a suburb of Quebec City.

During World War II, Guay obtained a conscription deferment. In August 1941, he married Rita Morel and moved to Quebec City, where he worked at the Dominion Arsenal and sold jewelry and watches on the side. During this time, Guay met a watchmaker named Généreux Ruest, becoming close friends with Ruest and his sister, Marguerite Pitre. Towards the end of the war, Guay started selling jewelry fulltime, offering engagement rings, crucifixes, and watches. He also picked up damaged watches and took them to Ruest, who had his own workshop, to be repaired. Ruest and his wife moved to Sept-Îles, where the couple had a daughter in 1945.

Pitre was born in Saint-Octave-de-Métis, Quebec. She ran a boarding house at Saint-Roch, and was known by her neighbours and later the press as "Madame le Corbeau" ("Madame Raven") because she always wore black, or La femme Pitre.

== Motive ==
In the summer of 1947, Guay met and started an affair with 17-year-old waitress Marie-Ange Robitaille (she told Guay she was 19). Robitaille knew Guay was married and had a child, but Guay introduced himself to her parents as a young single man under the alias of "Roger Angers". In about a year, Guay was calling Robitaille, whom he was now regularly meeting, on the phone two or three times a week.

In November 1948, Guay's wife learned about the affair and told Robitaille's parents, who then kicked their daughter out of their house. Robitaille contacted Guay, who then called Pitre. Guay and Pitre were close friends, with Pitre saying she was like a mother to the younger man. Pitre owned a boarding house near where Guay and Robitaille met, and had helped arrange some of their meetings. Guay asked Pitre if she could take in Robitaille, to which she agreed. Pitre herself moved a week later, while Guay paid for Robitaille's rent.

Robitaille's parents quickly changed their minds about kicking their daughter out. However, it was difficult to communicate with her. Afraid of her parents causing trouble if they found out where she was, Robitaille pretended that she was living in Montreal. In early 1949, however, she decided she wanted to return home and leave Guay. Robitaille borrowed $50 from the owner of the restaurant where she worked and bought a railroad ticket to Montreal. However, Guay followed her to the train and told her that if she didn't come back, he'd make a scene. Robitaille went back with Guay to the apartment. Guay then warned Robitaille against escaping by burning her gloves and going to bed wearing her coat. The next morning, he cashed in her unused train ticket.

In April 1949, Guay offered a family friend, 21-year-old Lucien Carreau, $500 to kill his wife. His plan was for Carreau to kill Rita with poisoned wine. Carreau called Guay crazy and refused. In June 1949, Guay's wife became fed up with her husband, took their daughter, and moved in with her mother. Robitaille finally left Guay, returned to her parents, and got a different job at a closer restaurant.

As Robitaille was walking to work one day in June, Guay confronted her, pulled out a gun, and threatened that if she didn't return to him, he'd shoot himself, and maybe her as well. Robitaille refused. Guay persisted, but fled after a policeman heard them arguing and approached the two. The officer escorted Robitaille to her workplace and waited to see if Guay would return. When he did, Guay was arrested and charged with attempted assault with a deadly weapon. Guay called Pitre, who got him a lawyer. The lawyer managed to get Guay's charge reduced to illegally carrying a firearm. Guay was fined $25 and set free the following morning.

Two days later, Guay called Robitaille and said they had to meet. She reluctantly agreed. Guay told her his wife was going to have her arrested for damaging his reputation. Guay said Robitaille needed to immediately flee to Montreal and hide there until the threat went away. Robitaille fled to Montreal with Guay. There, he bought her some new clothes, and apparently paid so much attention to her that she agreed to fly with him to Sept-Îles. However, the two were fighting once more within a week.

At the end of July, Robitaille left Guay once more. Guay gave her a note as she left. "I love you terribly," it read. "We'll be together again very soon." The end of the note instructed Robitaille to destroy it afterwards, but she did not. At this point, Guay became serious about trying to kill his wife. He believed the only way he could be with Robitaille would be to marry her. Given the era and circumstances, a divorce was difficult to obtain. Since Guay's unfaithfulness was well-known, he would be the first suspect if his wife was killed. Guay recruited Ruest and Pitre, both of whom were suffering financial troubles, for his plot. Guay offered Ruest money and a discount on a ring that he wanted to buy for a woman. As for Pitre, she owed Guay $600, a debt he offered to cancel in exchange for her assistance.

Pitre went to a hardware store and found it was impossible to buy dynamite in Canada without signing for it, so she gave a false name. She told the clerk that she was buying on behalf of a woman who wanted to destroy some tree stumps. She bought 20 half-pound sticks of dynamite, 15 detonating caps, and a 30-foot length of fuse. She wrapped the dynamite in a package, which she gave to Guay. Guay took the package to Ruest and, late that night, started on a holiday with his wife. Rita thought the vacation was supposed to be a reconciliation, and Guay acted very kind to her.

Guay and Ruest decided to rig a time bomb. As they were planning, Pitre proposed an alternative plan. They could enlist the help of her neighbour, a taxi driver who she was on good terms with. Pitre said the driver could take Guay's wife for a ride with the bomb in the trunk. At a certain point, he would pretend that something had gone wrong with the engine, and he and Guay would get out and look for help, leaving Rita by herself. After a few minutes, the bomb would explode. Guay and Ruest encouraged Pitre to follow through on her plan. They listened from hiding as she talked to the taxi driver. However, the man said he wasn't willing to destroy his cab.

Guay decided to blow up an airplane while his wife was on board. To convince his wife to board the plane, he gave her two suitcases of jewelry which he had in storage since early August. She agreed. Guay contracted a $10,000 insurance policy on his wife on the day of the flight.

== Flight 108 ==
Flight 108 was a Douglas DC-3 operated by Canadian Pacific Air Lines flying from Montreal to Baie-Comeau with a stopover at Quebec City.

Guay calculated that the explosion would send the plane into the Saint Lawrence River which would have made any forensic investigation very difficult with the technology of the time. A five-minute takeoff delay caused the plane to crash instead at Cap Tourmente, near Sault-au-Cochon in the Charlevoix region of Quebec, killing all 23 persons on board – four crew members and 19 passengers including four children. The bombing was the second attack against civil aviation in North America and received wide news coverage locally and abroad. All but three of the victims were Canadians. The three exceptions were the president, president-designate, and vice-president of the Kennecott Copper Corporation.

== Arrests, trials, and executions ==
Since the plane had crashed onto land instead of into water, the police had more access to evidence. They soon realized that the explosion was not an accident. One officer told a reporter about the case, who wrote, without mentioning names, that the police were searching for a woman who delivered an unusual package to the airport.

The story appeared on September 15, but Guay did not see it until four days later. He then went to Pitre and said they were in serious trouble. However, he proposed a solution. Guay said Pitre should kill herself and leave a note admitting sole responsibility for the explosion. Pitre refused. Instead, she called her doctor and complained about abdominal problems. After being taken to the hospital, she took enough sleeping pills to make her drowsy. On September 23, Pitre returned home and was questioned by the police. She confessed to taking a package to the airport on September 9 as a favor for Guay. Pitre concealed her own complicity, claiming Guay had told her that the package contained a statue.

Albert Guay was arrested two weeks after the crash and tried in February 1950. While awaiting trial, an informant reported that he said Ruest had made the mechanism of the bomb. The police went to Ruest, who admitted this, but said he thought the bomb was going to be used to blast tree stumps.

Guay showed a lack of interest in his trial and did not testify in his own defense. His only display of emotion throughout the entire trial happened when Robitaille took the stand and said she did not love him anymore. Guay was found guilty of murder on 14 March 1950. The judge, Albert Sévigny, cried as he presented a photo of Rita's body. Upon being convicted, Guay was sentenced to death by hanging. Before passing sentence, Sévigny declared to Guay, "Your crime is infamous. It has no name."

Guay did not file an appeal, "for reasons known only to myself," he said. The prosecutor said that if Guay could not live with Robitaille, he did not want to live at all. Guay was executed on 12 January 1951, at the age of 33. His last words were "Au moins, je meurs célèbre" (At least I die famous).

Before he was executed, however, Guay did send an extremely detailed 40-page confession directly to the Premier of Quebec, Maurice Duplessis. As a result, Ruest was arrested for murder on 6 June 1950, and tried in November of that year. The jury had the option of convicting him of manslaughter, but chose to convict him of murder. Marguerite Pitre was arrested on 14 June 1950, and tried separately, beginning 6 March 1951. Both were sentenced to death by hanging.

Ruest was hanged on 25 July 1952. Suffering from osseous tuberculosis, he had to be transported to the gallows in a wheelchair. Pitre was hanged on 9 January 1953, the thirteenth and last woman to be hanged in Canada. All three executions took place at Bordeaux Prison in Montreal.

== Aftermath ==
Six years later on 1 November 1955, a copycat airplane bombing was inspired by the Guay affair, the same way Guay himself had been inspired by a Filipino woman who blew up an airplane bomb to kill her husband. The bombing of United Air Lines Flight 629 by Jack Gilbert Graham killed all 44 people aboard, including his mother. Graham's motive was his mother's mistreatment of him as a small child, and featured similarities to the earlier bombings, including placing a dynamite time bomb in the target's suitcase and, just like Guay, Graham had purchased life insurance on his victim shortly before the flight.

== In popular culture ==
The incident, subsequent trials and execution of Guay and his accomplices was notorious in Quebec and was inspiration for the fictional The Crime of Ovide Plouffe (Le Crime d'Ovide Plouffe, a 1982 novel by Roger Lemelin and 1984 film of the same name by Denys Arcand). In 1949, Lemelin had been a friend and neighbour of Guay, as well as being the Quebec correspondent for Time magazine. The novel Cape Torment by Richard Donovan is based on the case.

== See also ==
- Aviation safety
- Capital punishment in Canada
- List of firsts in aviation
