= Jack Gilbert Graham =

American mass murderer (1932–1957)

Jack Graham
- Born: John Gilbert Graham; January 23, 1932; Denver, Colorado, U.S.
- Died: January 11, 1957 (aged 24); Colorado State Prison, Cañon City, Colorado, U.S.
- Cause of death: Execution by gas chamber
- Spouse: Gloria A. Elson
- Children: 2
- Motive: Life insurance money
- Conviction: First degree murder
- Penalty: Death

Details
- Victims: 44 (including his mother)
- Date: November 1, 1955; 7:02 p.m.
- Country: United States
- Location: Longmont, Colorado
- Target: Daisie E. Walker (mother)
- Weapon: Dynamite bomb

John "Jack" Gilbert Graham (January 23, 1932 – January 11, 1957) was an American mass murderer who, on November 1, 1955, killed 44 people aboard United Airlines Flight 629 near Longmont, Colorado, using a dynamite time bomb. Graham planted the bomb in his mother's suitcase in an apparent move to murder her and claim $37,500 (equivalent to $450,000 in 2025) worth of life insurance money from policies he purchased in the airport terminal just before the flight departure. Graham was convicted of murdering his mother. He was sentenced to death and was executed by the state of Colorado in January 1957. The bombing of Flight 629 is the worst mass murder in Colorado’s history.

== Background ==
John Gilbert Graham was born on January 23, 1932, in Denver, Colorado, the child of Daisie (née Walker) Graham and her second husband, William Graham. Daisie already had a daughter from her first marriage. Graham was known as "Jack". In 1937 his father died, and Daisie sent Jack to an orphanage. In 1941, Daisie was married for the third time to Earl King, who died shortly after their marriage. Using her inheritance from King's death, Daisie became a successful businesswoman, but nonetheless did not collect Graham from the orphanage. The two remained estranged until 1954, when Graham was 22 years old, and Daisie King was running a successful restaurant. After their reunion, King and Graham had a poor relationship, and often argued.

In 1955, shortly before the aircraft bombing, King's restaurant was destroyed in a suspicious gas explosion, believed to have been deliberately caused by Graham. Graham had insured the restaurant and collected on the property insurance following the explosion.

At the time of the bombing, Graham was married with two infant children.

== Bombing ==
United Airlines Flight 629 was using a Douglas DC-6B airliner (named "Mainliner Denver") piloted by World War II veteran Lee Hall on the evening of November 1, 1955. The flight had originated at New York City's LaGuardia Airport, making a stop in Chicago before continuing to Denver; it then took off from Denver, Colorado's Stapleton Airfield, bound for Portland, Oregon, with continuing service to Seattle. Minutes after the plane's departure from Denver, the DC-6B exploded, the flaming wreckage falling into farmland near Longmont, Colorado. There were no survivors.

Graham's mother had been a passenger on Flight 629, and was traveling to Alaska to visit her daughter, Graham's half-sister. At the time, flight insurance could be routinely purchased in vending machines at airports, until changes to the system in the 1980s.

Graham's apparent motive for the bombing was to claim $37,500 (equivalent to $450,000 in 2025) worth of life insurance money from policies he had purchased in the airport terminal just moments before the aircraft's departure.

== Arrest and conviction ==
Investigators discovered that Graham had a criminal record for embezzlement by check forgery, and illegal transport of whiskey for which he had served 60 days in a Texas prison. King's restaurant had been severely damaged by "a suspicious explosion" earlier that year, and Graham had received the insurance settlement. Local people also suspected Graham of deliberately causing his new pick-up truck to be struck by a train that year, in order to collect the insurance.

After reassembling fragments of the plane, the FBI determined that certain items of luggage in the baggage compartment had contained explosives. Based on that evidence, as well as his contradictory statements, physical evidence found at Graham's house, and finally a confession, Graham was charged with sabotage, then later murder.

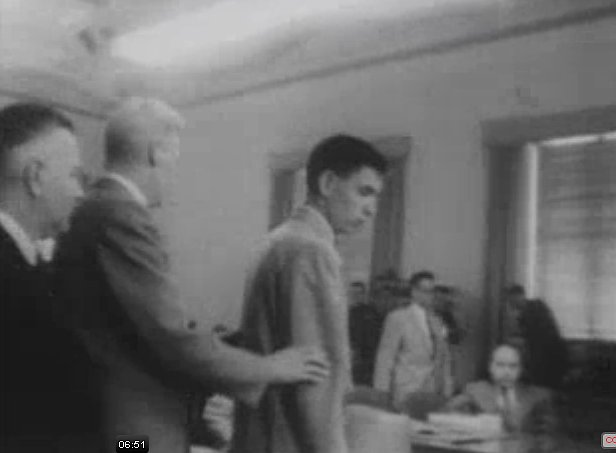
Graham as seen on TV in the courtroom

After Graham's arrest, Denver radio station KDEN owner Gene Amole and Rocky Mountain News photographer Morey Engle surreptitiously took a camera into the jail for an interview of Graham during a reunion with his wife Gloria. "I loved my mother very much", Graham told Amole. "She meant a lot to me. It's very hard for me to tell exactly how I feel. She left so much of herself behind." When Amole asked him why he confessed, he said the FBI had threatened to point out inconsistencies in statements made by his wife Gloria. "I was not about to let them touch her in any way, shape or form," he said. None of the Denver TV stations would agree to broadcast the film at the time, though it was eventually shown on one of Denver's local PBS stations as part of a documentary.

Graham's confessions gave details about the bomb that matched the evidence from the plane's wreckage. He also told prison doctors that he "realized that there were about 50 or 60 people carried on a DC6, but the number of people to be killed made no difference to me; it could have been a thousand. When their time comes, there is nothing they can do about it."

Graham's trial led to Colorado becoming the first state to officially sanction the broadcast of criminal trials on television. No federal statute at the time made it a crime to blow up an airplane. Therefore, on the day after Graham's confession, the Denver district attorney moved to prosecute Graham via the simplest possible route: premeditated murder of a single victim, his mother, Daisie King. Graham recanted his confession, but at his 1956 trial his defense was unable to counter the massive amount of evidence presented by the prosecution. In February 1956, he attempted suicide in his cell, and was thereafter put under 24-hour surveillance. On May 5, 1956, Graham was convicted of the murder of his mother, Daisie King, and was sentenced to death.

Graham was executed in the Colorado State Penitentiary gas chamber on January 11, 1957. One source has his final words being "Thanks, Warden", after Warden Tinsley patted him on the shoulder. Time magazine quoted a lengthier statement, "As far as feeling remorse for those people, I don't. I can't help it. Everybody pays their way and takes their chances. That's just the way it goes."

== Fictional portrayals ==
- Graham was portrayed by Nick Adams in the 1959 motion picture The FBI Story starring James Stewart and Vera Miles.
- The case was the basis for the 1960 "Fire in the Sky" episode of M Squad.
- The case was the basis for the 1959 "Flight 169--Mass Murder" episode of Deadline (1959 TV series).
- The case is the subject of the episode titled "Time Bomb" of the 2013 Investigation Discovery miniseries A Crime to Remember.

== Music ==
Macabre, a grindcore metal band from Chicago, wrote a song about Graham called "There Was a Young Man Who Blew Up a Plane", on their Sinister Slaughter album.

== See also ==
- Albert Guay
- Capital punishment in Colorado
- List of people executed in Colorado
- List of people executed in the United States in 1957
