= 1956 Grand Canyon mid-air collision =

1956 mid-air collision over Arizona

1956 Grand Canyon mid-air collision TWA Flight 2 · United Air Lines Flight 718
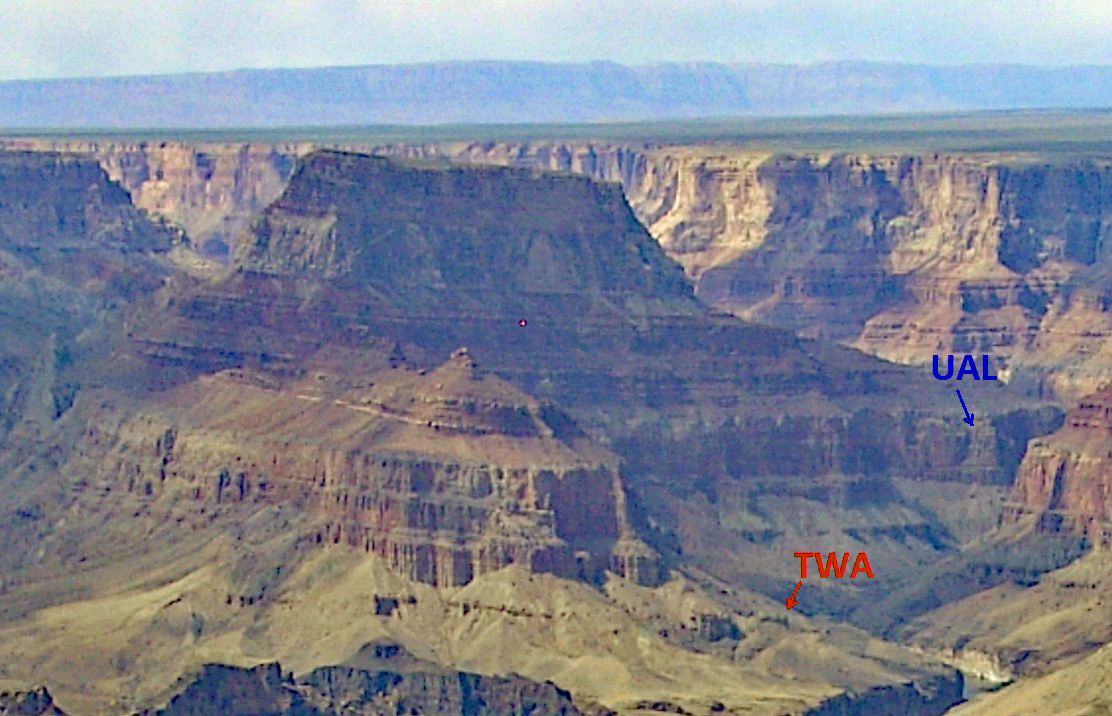
- The location of the two crash sites in the Grand Canyon

Accident
- Date: June 30, 1956
- Summary: Mid-air collision due to inadequate ATC system
- Site: Grand Canyon, Arizona, United States
- Total fatalities: 128
- Total survivors: 0

First aircraft
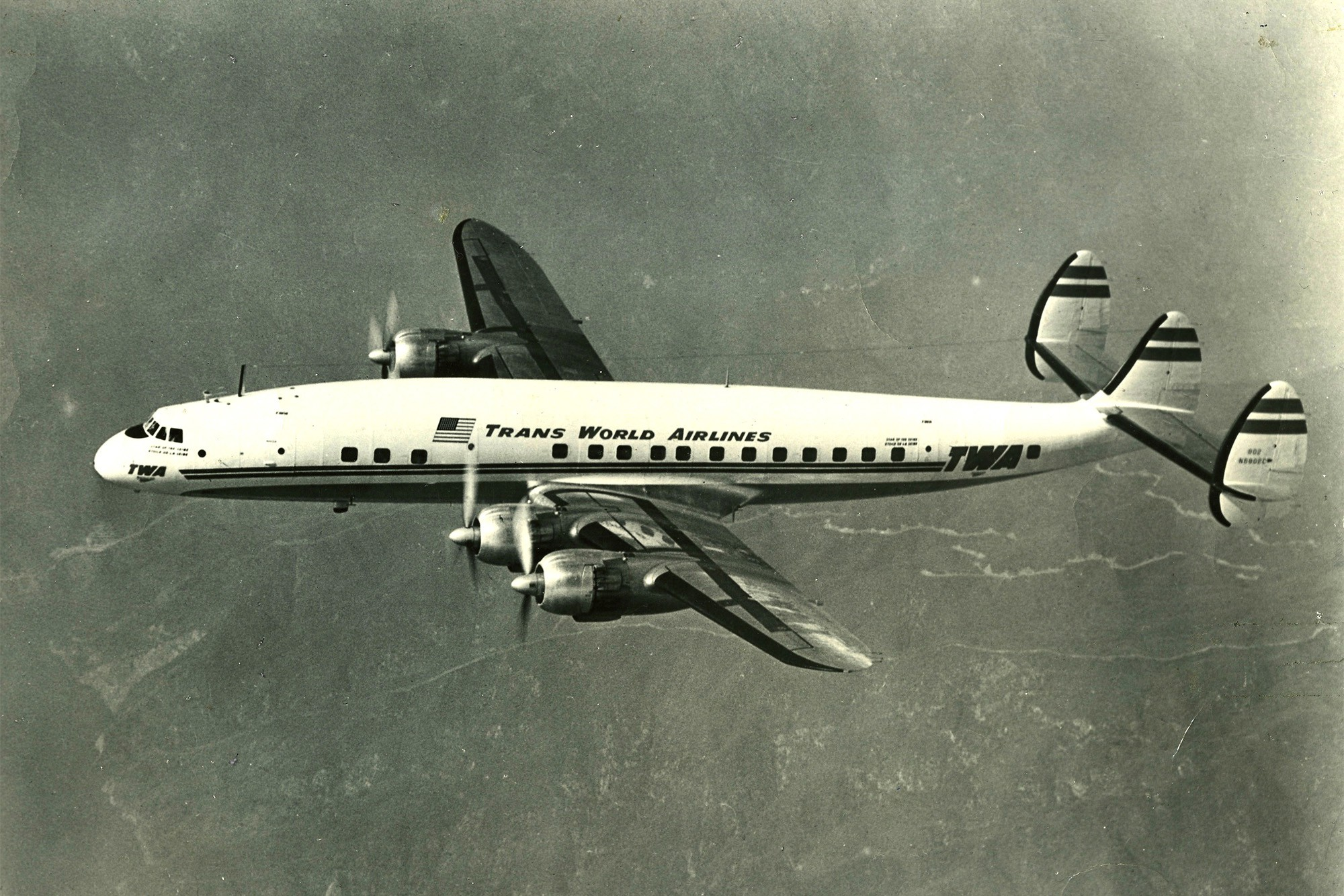
- N6902C, the Lockheed L-1049A Super Constellation involved in the collision
- Type: Lockheed L-1049A Super Constellation
- Name: Star of the Seine
- Operator: Trans World Airlines
- IATA flight No.: TW2
- ICAO flight No.: TWA2
- Call sign: TWA 2
- Registration: N6902C
- Flight origin: Los Angeles International Airport, California, United States
- Destination: Kansas City Downtown Airport, Kansas City, Missouri, United States
- Occupants: 70
- Passengers: 64
- Crew: 6
- Fatalities: 70
- Survivors: 0

Second aircraft
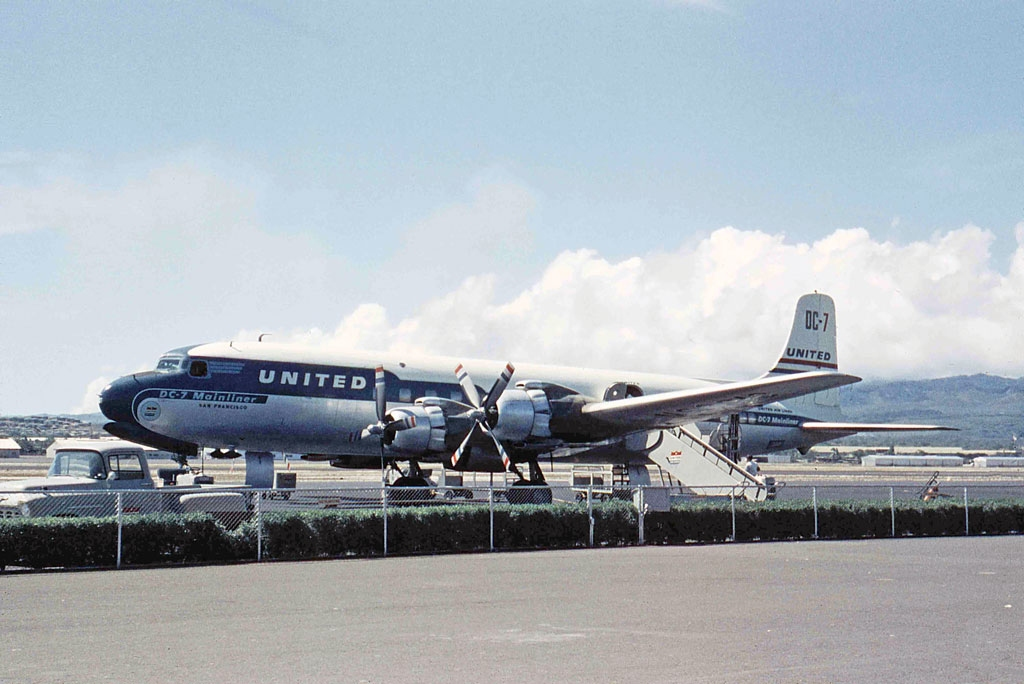
- A United Air Lines Douglas DC-7 Mainliner, similar to the one involved in the collision
- Type: Douglas DC-7 Mainliner
- Name: Mainliner Vancouver
- Operator: United Air Lines
- IATA flight No.: UA718
- ICAO flight No.: UAL718
- Call sign: UNITED 718
- Registration: N6324C
- Flight origin: Los Angeles International Airport, California, United States
- Destination: Chicago Midway Airport, Illinois, United States
- Occupants: 58
- Passengers: 53
- Crew: 5
- Fatalities: 58
- Survivors: 0

On June 30, 1956, a Lockheed L-1049A Super Constellation operating as TWA Flight 2, was struck by a Douglas DC-7 Mainliner operating as United Air Lines Flight 718 over Grand Canyon National Park, Arizona. The Constellation fell into the canyon, while the DC-7 slammed into a cliff. All 128 people on board both aircraft died, making it the first commercial airline incident to exceed one hundred fatalities. Both aircraft had departed Los Angeles International Airport minutes apart from each other and headed for Chicago and Kansas City, respectively. The collision took place in uncontrolled airspace, where it was the pilots' responsibility to maintain separation ("see and be seen"). This highlighted the antiquated state of air traffic control, which became the focus of major aviation reforms.

== Flight history ==
TWA Flight 2, a Lockheed L-1049 Super Constellation named Star of the Seine, with Captain Jack Gandy (age 41), First Officer James Ritner (31), and Flight Engineer Forrest Breyfogle (37), departed Los Angeles on Saturday, June 30, 1956, at 9:01 am PST with 64 passengers (including 11 TWA off-duty employees on free tickets) and six crew members (including two flight attendants and an off-duty flight engineer), and headed to Kansas City Downtown Airport. Flight 2, initially flying under instrument flight rules (IFR), climbed to altitude 19,000 feet (5,800 m) and stayed in controlled airspace as far as Daggett, California. At Daggett, Captain Gandy turned right to a heading of 059 degrees magnetic, toward the radio range near Trinidad, Colorado. The Constellation was now "off airways", otherwise known as flying in uncontrolled airspace.

United Air Lines Flight 718, a Douglas DC-7 named Mainliner Vancouver, was piloted by Captain Robert "Bob" Shirley (age 48), First Officer Robert Harms (36), and Flight Engineer Girardo "Gerard" Fiore (39). They departed Los Angeles at 9:04 am PST with 53 passengers and 5 crew members (including two flight attendants), bound for Chicago's Midway Airport. Climbing to an authorized altitude of 21,000 feet (6,400 m), Captain Shirley flew under IFR in controlled airspace to a point (Note: The "Palm Springs" intersection was at about 33.92N 116.28W.) northeast of Palm Springs, California, where he turned left toward a radio beacon near Needles, California, after which his flight plan was direct to Durango in southwestern Colorado. (Note: The report says their flight plan was Needles direct to Durango, but it's unclear what "Durango" means. There never was an LF/MF radio range there, and the VOR wasn't there in 1956. (There was an AM radio station.)) United's DC-7, though still under IFR, was now, like TWA's Constellation, en route in uncontrolled airspace.

Shortly after takeoff TWA's Captain Gandy requested permission to climb to 21,000 feet to avoid thunderheads that were forming near his flight path. As was the practice at the time, his request had to be relayed by a TWA flight dispatcher to air traffic control (ATC), as neither crew was in direct contact with ATC after departure. ATC denied the request; the two airliners would soon be reentering controlled airspace (the Red 15 airway running southeast from Las Vegas) and ATC had no way to provide the horizontal separation required between two aircraft at the same altitude.

Captain Gandy then requested "1,000 on top" clearance (flying 1,000 feet (300 m) above the clouds, and thus in visual meteorological conditions). This was approved by ATC, and meant that the Constellation was still under IFR but free of separation restrictions normally applied by ATC. It transferred to Gandy and Ritner the responsibility for maintaining safe separation from other aircraft, on the principle then termed "see and be seen" (more recently "see and avoid").

This division of responsibilities between aircrew and ATC is especially useful when two aircraft are transitioning to or from an airfield approach when VFR conditions exist above cloud layers. It is less common en route.

Upon receiving "1,000 on top" clearance, Captain Gandy increased his altitude to 21,000 feet (6,400 m). Both crews were then at this altitude, and both had estimated that they would cross the Painted Desert line at about 10:31 am Pacific time. The Painted Desert line was about two hundred miles (320 km) long, running between the VORs at Bryce Canyon, Utah, and Winslow, Arizona, at an angle of 335 degrees relative to true north – wholly outside of controlled air space. Owing to the different headings taken by the two planes, TWA's crossing of the Painted Desert line, assuming no further course changes, would be at a 13-degree angle relative to that of the United flight, with the Constellation to the left of the DC-7.

As the two aircraft approached the Grand Canyon, at the same altitude and nearly the same speed, the pilots were likely maneuvering around towering cumulus clouds. (The Constellation's clearance required it to stay in clear air – and above cloud.) As they were maneuvering near the canyon, it is believed the planes passed the same cloud on opposite sides.

== Accident ==
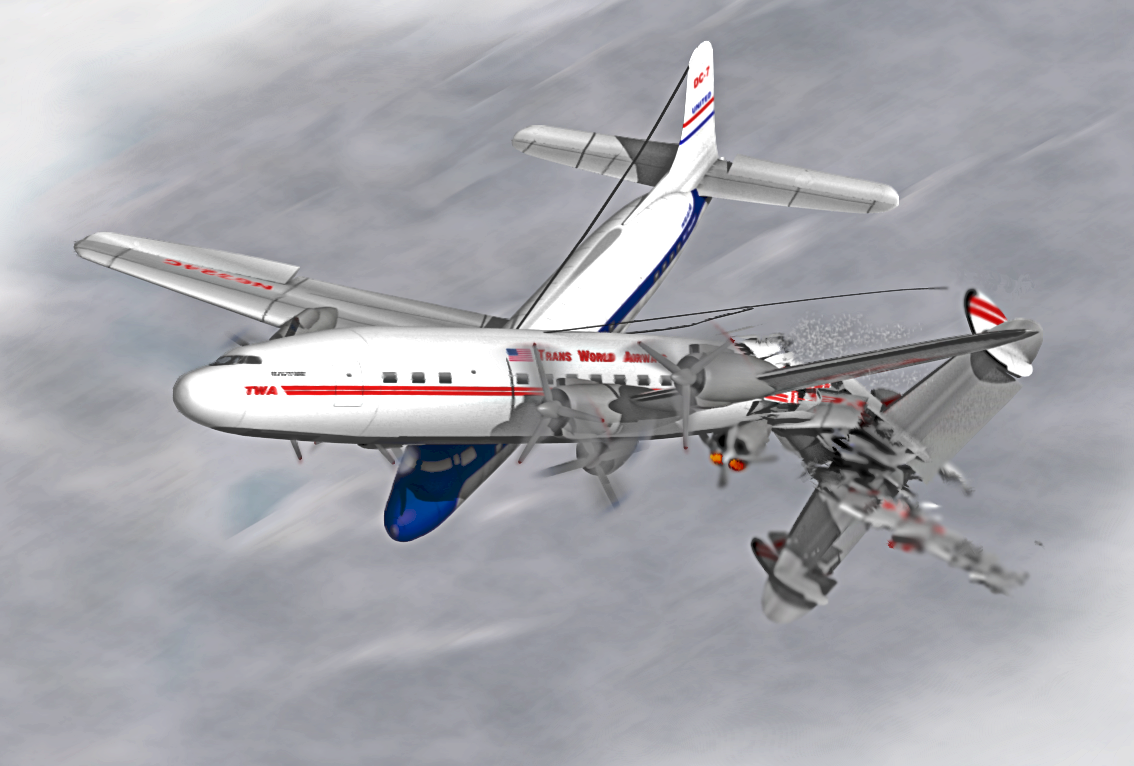
Illustration of the collision

At 10:32 am, the two aircraft collided over the canyon at an angle of about 25 degrees. Post-crash analysis determined that the United DC-7 was banking to the right and pitching down at the time of the collision, suggesting that one or possibly both of the United pilots spotted the TWA Constellation and attempted evasive action.

The DC-7's upraised left wing clipped the top of the Constellation's right and center vertical stabilizer and struck the fuselage immediately ahead of the stabilizer's base, causing the tail assembly to break away from the rest of the airframe. The propeller on the DC-7's left outboard, or number one engine, concurrently chopped a series of gashes into the bottom of the Constellation's fuselage. Explosive decompression would have instantaneously occurred from the damage, a theory substantiated by light debris, such as cabin furnishings and personal effects, being scattered over a large area.

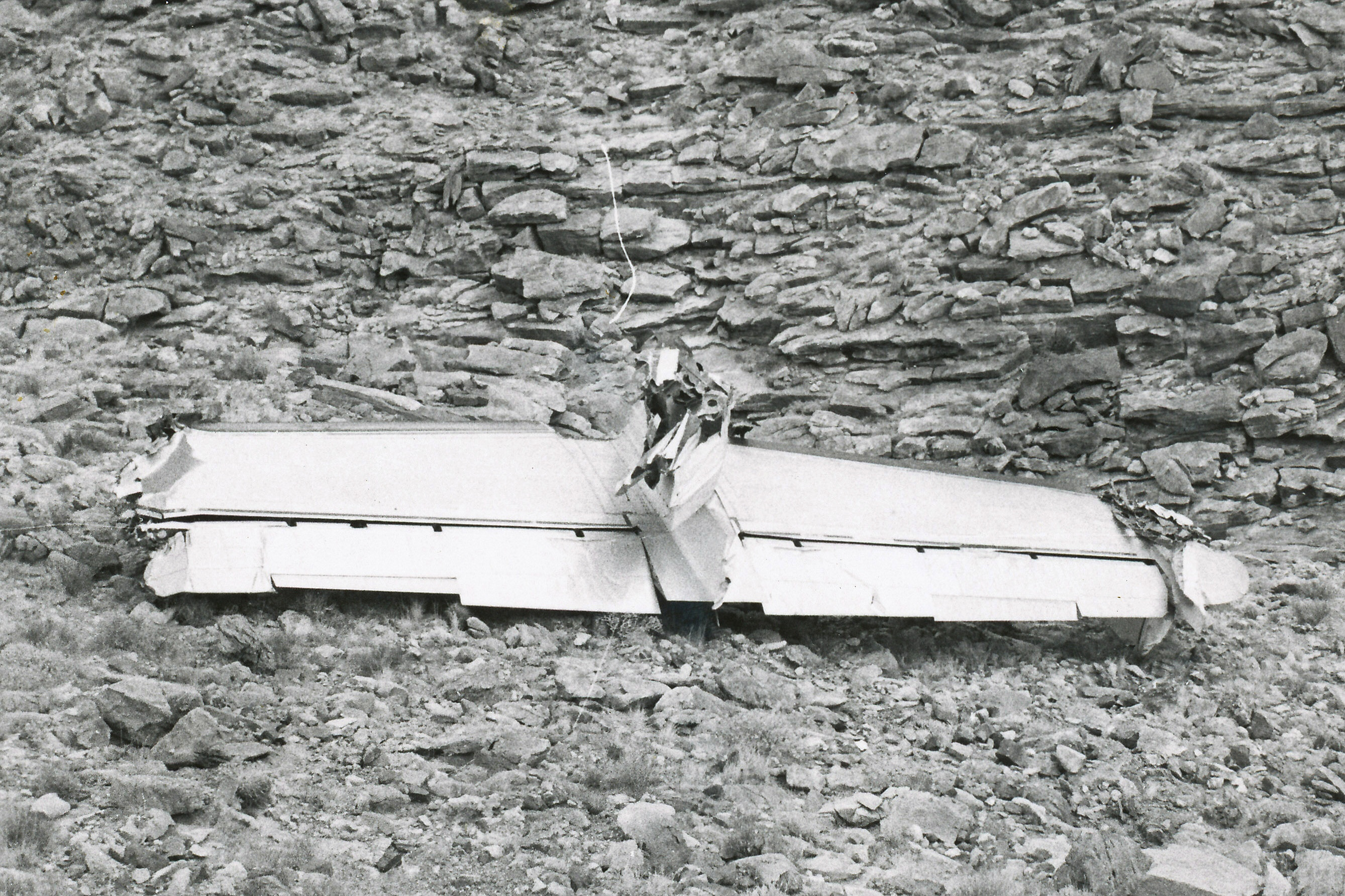
The severed tail assembly of the TWA Constellation with the unique three vertical stabilizers missing, as photographed by park rangers during the CAB investigation

The separation of the tail assembly from the Constellation resulted in immediate loss of control, causing the aircraft to enter a near-vertical, terminal velocity dive. Plunging into the Grand Canyon at an estimated speed of more than 700 feet per second (210 m/s; 410 kn; 480 mph; 770 km/h), the Constellation slammed upside down into the north slope of a ravine on the northeast slope of Temple Butte and disintegrated on impact, instantly killing all aboard. An intense fire, fueled by aviation gasoline, ensued. The severed tail assembly, badly battered but still somewhat recognizable, came to rest nearby.

The DC-7's left wing to the left of the number one engine was mangled by the impact and was no longer capable of producing substantial lift. The engine had been severely damaged as well, and the combined loss of lift and propulsion left the crippled airliner in a rapidly descending left spiral from 21,000ft, from which recovery was impossible. The Mainliner collided with the south side cliff of Chuar Butte in a slight nose down angle and disintegrated, instantly killing all aboard.

== Aftermath ==
=== Search and recovery ===
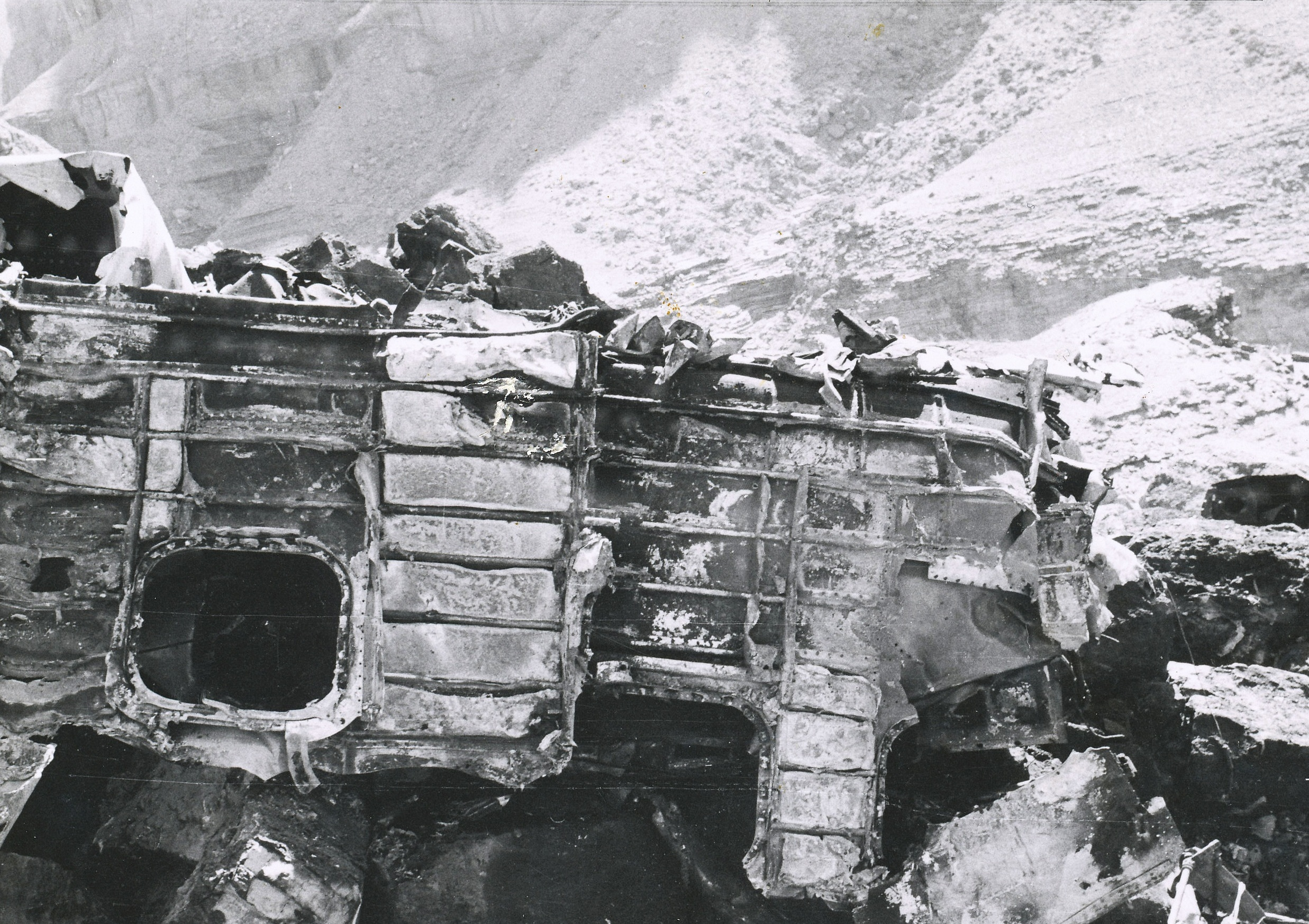
The wreckage of TWA Flight 2

The airspace over the canyon was not under any type of radar observation and there were no homing beacons, cockpit voice recorders, or flight data recorders aboard either aircraft. The last position reports received from the flights did not reflect their locations at the time of the collision. Also, there were no credible witnesses to the collision itself or the subsequent crashes.

The only immediate indication of trouble was when United company radio operators in Salt Lake City and San Francisco heard a garbled transmission from Flight 718 (the DC-7), the last from either aircraft. Civil Aeronautics Board (CAB) accident investigation engineers later deciphered the transmission – which had been preserved on magnetic tape – as the voice of co-pilot Robert Harms declaring, "Salt Lake, [ah], 718 ... we are going in!" The shrill voice of Captain Shirley was heard in the background as, presumably futilely struggling with the controls, he implored the airplane to "[Pull] up! [Pull] up!" (bracketed words were inferred by investigators from the context and circumstances in which they were uttered).

After neither flight reported their current position for some time, the two aircraft were declared to be missing, and search and rescue procedures started. The wreckage was first seen late in the day near the confluence of the Colorado and Little Colorado Rivers by Henry and Palen Hudgin, two brothers who operated Grand Canyon Airlines, a small air taxi service. During a trip earlier in the day, Palen had noted dense black smoke rising near Temple Butte, the crash site of the Constellation, but had dismissed it as brush set ablaze by lightning.

However, upon hearing of the missing airliners, Palen decided that what he had seen might have been smoke from a post-crash fire. He and his brother flew a light aircraft (a Piper Tri-Pacer) deep into the canyon and searched near the location of the smoke. The Constellation's empennage was found, and the brothers reported their findings to authorities. The following day, the two men pinpointed the wreckage of the DC-7. Numerous helicopter missions were subsequently flown down to the crash sites to find and attempt to identify victims, as well as recover wreckage for accident analysis, a difficult and dangerous process due to the rugged terrain and unpredictable air currents.

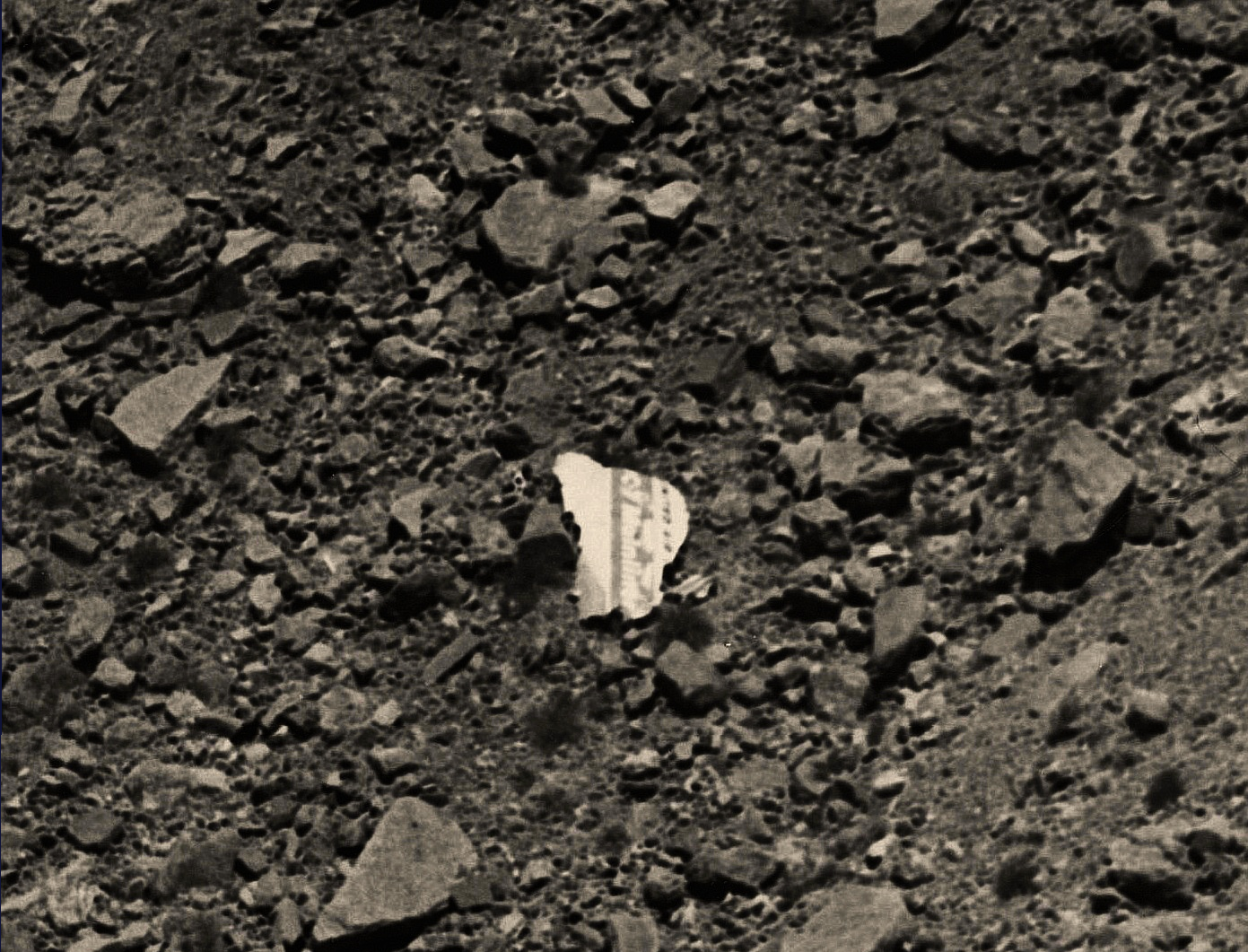
The aft fuselage fragment of United Flight 718, with text reading "[D]C-7 Mainliner", on Chuar Butte.

The airlines hired the Swiss Air-Rescue and some Swiss mountain climbers to go to the scene where the aircraft fuselages had crashed. They were to gather the remains of the passengers and their personal effects. This was given considerable publicity in U.S. news releases at the time because of the ruggedness of the terrain where the fuselages came to rest.

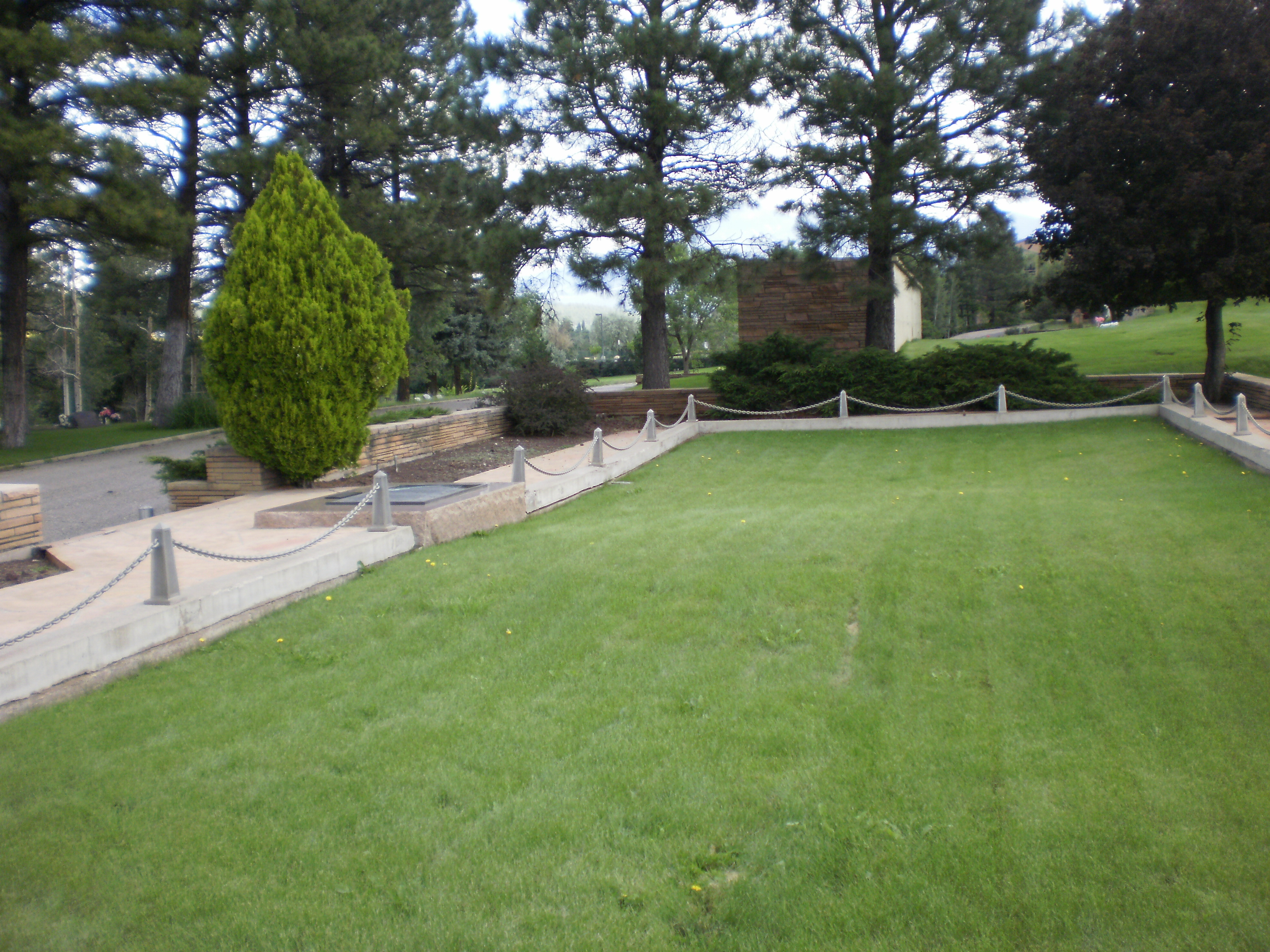
Burial site and memorial for the TWA passengers and crew, Citizens Cemetery, Flagstaff, Arizona. 1956 funeral photo from Life magazine.

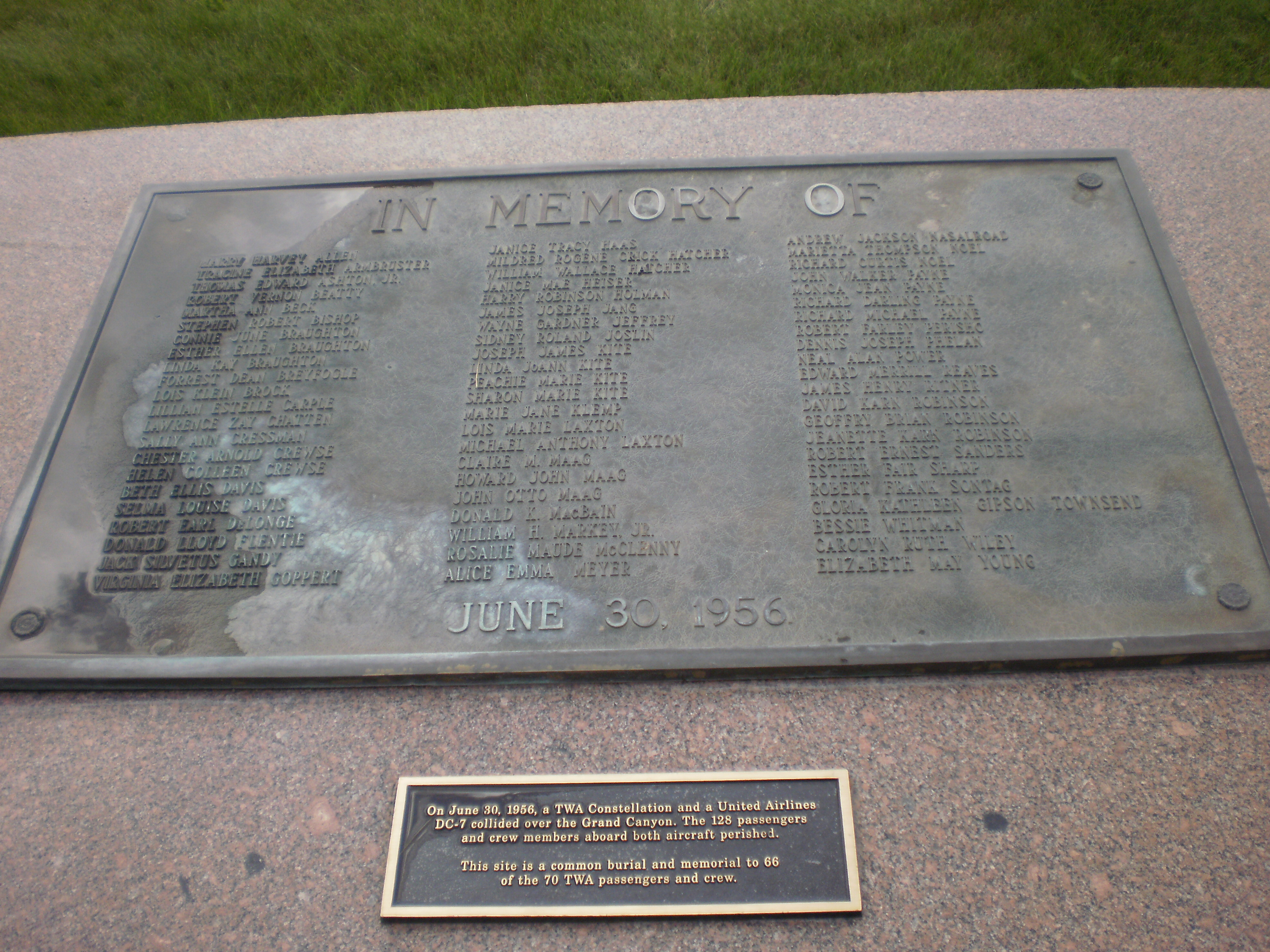
Close-up of plaque honoring TWA passengers and crew, Citizens Cemetery

Owing to the great violence of the impacts, no bodies were recovered intact and positive identification of most of the remains was not possible. On July 9, 1956, a mass funeral for the victims of TWA Flight 2 was held, at the canyon's south rim. Twenty-nine victims of the United flight were identified. The remains of the remaining twenty-nine victims were interred in four caskets at the Grand Canyon Pioneer Cemetery. Only four of the seventy TWA passengers and crew were identifiable. The remaining sixty-six were buried in a mass grave at Citizens Cemetery in Flagstaff. A number of years elapsed following this accident before most of the wreckage was removed from the canyon. Some pieces of the aircraft still remain at the crash sites.

=== Investigation ===
The investigation of this accident, led by Jack Parshall, was particularly challenging due to the remoteness and topography of the crash sites, as well as the extent of the destruction of the two airliners and the lack of real-time flight data as might be derived from a modern flight data recorder. Despite the considerable difficulties, CAB experts were able to determine with a remarkable degree of certainty what had transpired and, in their report, issued the following statement as probable cause for the accident:

The Board determines that the probable cause of this mid-air collision was that the pilots did not see each other in time to avoid the collision. It is not possible to determine why the pilots did not see each other, but the evidence suggests that it resulted from any one or a combination of the following factors: Intervening clouds reducing time for visual separation, visual limitations due to cockpit visibility, and preoccupation with normal cockpit duties, preoccupation with matters unrelated to cockpit duties such as attempting to provide the passengers with a more scenic view of the Grand Canyon area, physiological limits to human vision reducing the time opportunity to see and avoid the other aircraft, or insufficiency of en route air traffic advisory information due to inadequacy of facilities and lack of personnel in air traffic control.

In the report, weather and airworthiness of the two planes were thought to have played no role in the accident. Lacking credible eyewitnesses and with some uncertainty regarding high altitude visibility at the time of the collision, it was not possible to determine conclusively how much opportunity was available for the TWA and United pilots to see and avoid each other.

Neither flight crew was specifically implicated in the CAB's finding of probable cause, although the decision by TWA's Captain Gandy to cancel his IFR flight plan and fly "1,000 on top" was the likely catalyst for the accident. Also worth noting was that the investigation itself was thorough in all respects, but the final report focused on technical issues and largely ignored contributory human factors, such as why the airlines permitted their pilots to execute maneuvers solely intended to improve the passengers' view of the canyon. It would not be until the late 1970s that human factors would be as thoroughly investigated as technical matters following aerial mishaps.

During the investigation, Milford "Mel" Hunter, a scientific and technical illustrator with Life magazine, was given early and unrestricted access to the CAB's data and preliminary findings, enabling him to produce an illustration of what likely occurred at the moment of the collision. Hunter's finely detailed gouache painting first appeared in Life's April 29, 1957, issue and was subsequently included in David Gero's 1996 edition of Aviation Disasters II.

In a letter to Gero in 1995, Hunter wrote: (Note: As related by Susan Smith-Hunter, Mel Hunter's widow.)

I was able to plot the two intersecting flight paths and the fact that both planes were in each other's blind spot. I remember showing that the descending aircraft's propellers chewed a series of gashes along the fuselage top of the ascending aircraft. I did a lot of this type of factual re-creation for Life. They were always extremely tough to piece together to the satisfaction of all the editors, art directors and assorted researchers who were assigned to such projects. But, it was extremely interesting work.

Hunter's recollection of his illustration was not completely accurate. The painting showed the DC-7 below the Constellation, with the former's number one engine beneath the latter's fuselage, which disagreed with the CAB technical findings.

=== Catalyst for change ===
At 128 fatalities, the Grand Canyon collision became the deadliest U.S. commercial airline disaster and deadliest air crash on U.S. soil of any kind, surpassing United Air Lines Flight 409 the year before. It was surpassed in both respects on December 16, 1960, by the 1960 New York mid-air collision. Coincidentally, the collision also involved United and TWA and saw 128 deaths in the two aircraft (in addition to 6 deaths on ground). However, it is still the deadliest aviation disaster in the state of Arizona.

The accident was covered by the press worldwide, and as the story unfolded, the public learned of the primitive nature of air traffic control (ATC) and how little was being done to modernize it. The air traffic controller who had cleared TWA to "1,000 on top" was severely criticized as he had not advised Captains Gandy and Shirley about the potential for a traffic conflict following the clearance, even though he must have known of the possibility. The controller was publicly blamed for the accident by both airlines and was vilified in the press, but he was cleared of any wrongdoing. As Charles Carmody (the then-assistant ATC director) testified during the investigation, neither flight was legally under the control of ATC when they collided, as both were "off airways." The controller was not required to issue a traffic conflict advisory to either pilot. According to the CAB accident investigation final report, page 8, the en-route controller relayed a traffic advisory regarding United 718 to TWA's ground radio operator: "ATC clears TWA 2, maintain at least 1,000 on top. Advise TWA 2 his traffic is United 718, direct Durango, estimating Needles at 0957." The TWA operator testified that Captain Gandy acknowledged the information on the United flight as "traffic received."

The accident was particularly alarming in that public confidence in air travel had increased during the 1950s with the introduction of new airliners like the Super Constellation, Douglas DC-7, and Boeing Stratocruiser. Travel by air had become routine for large corporations, and vacationers often considered flying instead of traveling by train. At the time, a congressional committee was reviewing domestic air travel, as there was growing concern over the number of accidents. However, little progress was being made and the state of ATC at the time of the Grand Canyon accident reflected the methods of the 1930s.

As near-misses and mid-air collisions continued, the public demanded action. Often-contentious congressional hearings followed, and in 1957, increased funding was allocated to modernize ATC, hire and train more air traffic controllers, and procure much-needed radar – initially military surplus equipment.

However, control of American airspace continued to be split between the military and the Civil Aeronautics Administration (CAA, the federal agency in charge of air traffic control at the time). The CAA had no authority over military flights, which could enter controlled airspace with no warning to other traffic. The result was a series of near-misses and collisions involving civil and military aircraft, the latter often flying at much higher speeds than the former. For example, in 1958, the collision of United Air Lines Flight 736 flying "on-airways" and an F-100 Super Sabre fighter jet near Las Vegas, Nevada, resulted in 49 fatalities.

Again, action was demanded. After more hearings, the Federal Aviation Act of 1958 was passed, dissolving the CAA and creating the Federal Aviation Agency (FAA, later renamed the Federal Aviation Administration in 1966). The FAA was given total authority over American airspace, including military activity, and as procedures and ATC facilities were modernized, mid-air collisions gradually became less frequent.

In 1960, a jury in Kansas City, in a judgment against United Air Lines, awarded the estate of Jack S. Gandy, the pilot of the TWA flight, $64,000 (equivalent to $700,000 in 2025), and the estate of James H. Ritner, the co-pilot, $45,000 (equivalent to $490,000 in 2025).

=== National Historic Landmark ===
- 1956 Grand Canyon mid-air collision
- U.S. National Register of Historic Places
- U.S. National Historic Landmark
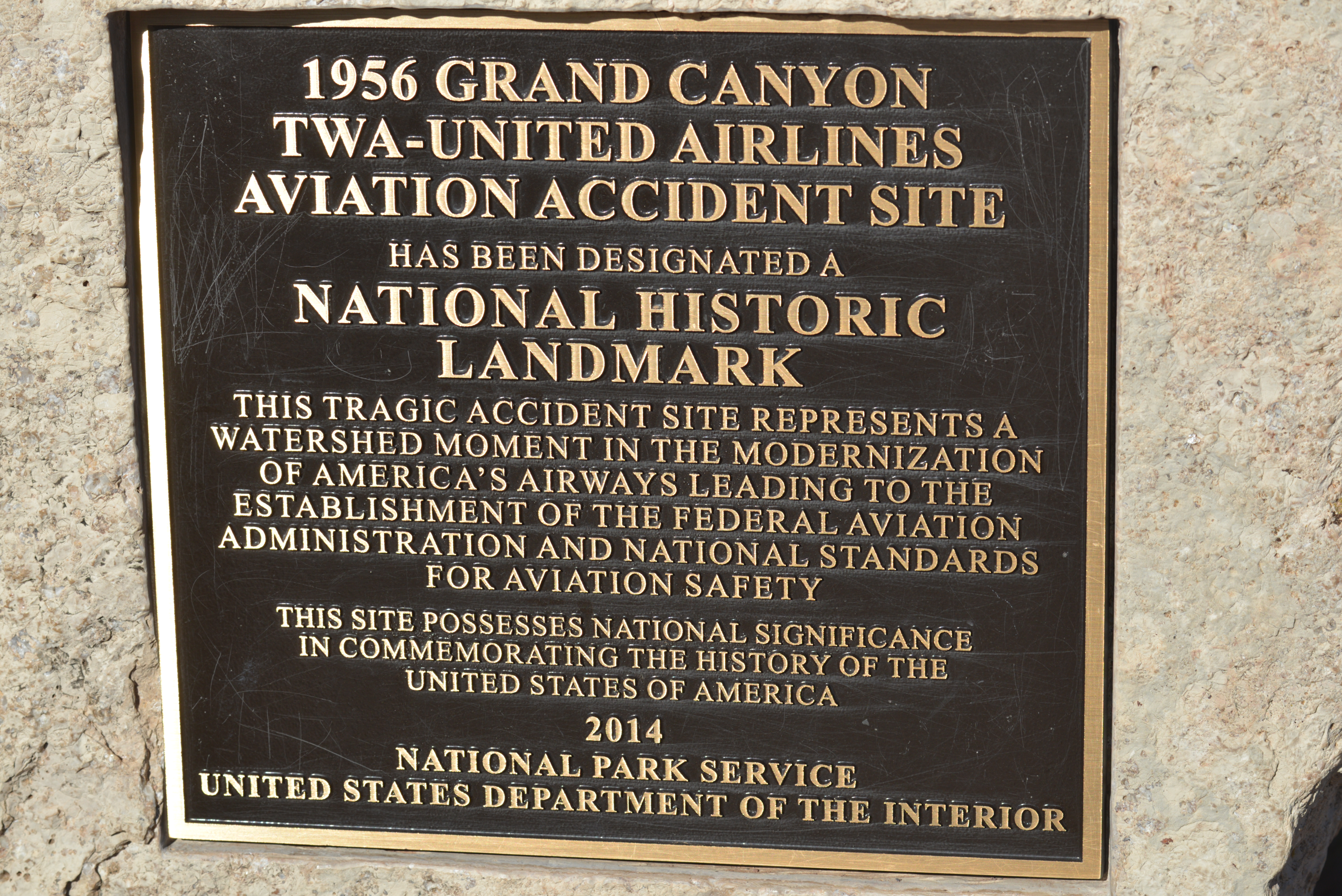
- Location: Coconino County, Arizona
- Coordinates: 36°10′30″N 111°50′00″W
- NRHP reference No.: 14000280
- Added to NRHP: April 22, 2014

On April 22, 2014, the site of the crash was declared a National Historic Landmark, making it the first landmark for an event that happened in the air. The location, in a remote portion of the canyon accessible only to hikers, has been closed to the public since the 1950s.

== In popular culture ==
In 2006, the story of this disaster was covered in the third season of the History Channel program UFO Files. The episode, entitled "Black Box UFO Secrets", contained the Universal Newsreel footage of the accident narrated by Ed Herlihy.

In 2009, the story of the disaster, along with other mid-air collisions, was featured on the eighth season of the National Geographic Channel show Mayday (also known as Air Emergency, Air Crash Investigation and Air Disasters). The episode is entitled "System Breakdown" or "Grand Canyon" (Mayday, Season 8, episode 1, first broadcast 10 June 2009; Air Disasters, season 4, episode 6, first broadcast June 8, 2014). In 2013, an episode from the twelfth season, entitled "Grand Canyon Disaster", also featured this accident.

It is featured in season 1, episode 5, of the TV show Why Planes Crash, in an episode called "Collision Course".

In 2015, the first season of Mysteries at the National Parks on the Travel Channel, in the series' seventh episode, "Portal To The Underworld," the crash was also featured and was mentioned as being a "supernatural event."

The disaster figures in Tony Hillerman's 2004 novel, Skeleton Man.

== See also ==
- Aeroméxico Flight 498
- 1996 Charkhi Dadri mid-air collision
- Free flight (air traffic control)
- Gol Transportes Aéreos Flight 1907
- 1986 Grand Canyon mid-air collision, another airliner involved in a mid-air collision over the Grand Canyon
- Hughes Airwest Flight 706
- 2001 Japan Airlines mid-air incident
- List of National Historic Landmarks in Arizona
- National Register of Historic Places listings in Coconino County, Arizona
- 1960 New York mid-air collision, which also involved aircraft from United Air Lines and Trans World Airlines
- Pacific Southwest Airlines Flight 182
- 1922 Picardie mid-air collision
- 2002 Überlingen mid-air collision
- 1976 Zagreb mid-air collision
