= Jack Parshall =

American aviation safety investigator

Raymond P. (Jack) Parshall (c.1894 - May 14, 1973) was an American pilot and air crash investigator who became lead investigator for the Civil Aeronautics Board. Investigations that he led include the bombing of United Air Lines Flight 629 in 1955 and the 1956 Grand Canyon mid-air collision. His report on the Grand Canyon collision resulted in major changes to air traffic control in the United States.
