= Gary Lee Davis =

American convicted murderer (1944–1997)

- Born: August 13, 1944; Wichita, Kansas, U.S.
- Died: October 13, 1997 (aged 53); Colorado State Penitentiary, Colorado, U.S.
- Status: Executed by lethal injection
- Convictions: First degree murder Conspiracy to commit first degree murder Second degree kidnapping Conspiracy to commit second degree kidnapping First degree sexual assault
- Penalty: Death (July 21, 1987)

Details
- Victims: Virginia May, 34
- Location: Byers, Colorado
- Weapon: Rifle

Gary Lee Davis (August 13, 1944 – October 13, 1997) was an American convicted murderer and serial rapist who was executed by the U.S. state of Colorado in 1997. He was the only person to be executed by the state of Colorado between 1968 and 2020, when Colorado abolished capital punishment.

== Early life ==
Davis was born in Wichita, Kansas, on August 13, 1944. Although raised by his mother, he later claimed to have suffered sexual abuse from an early age at the hands of his older stepbrothers. After dropping out of school in the ninth grade, Davis joined the United States Marine Corps in 1961. He married Tonya Ann Tatem and the couple had two sons before their divorce. Davis held multiple jobs before marrying Leona Coates in 1974; he was 30 and she was 17 years old. They had four children.

Although Davis had a history of predatory sexual behavior, which he later admitted to following his murder conviction (on one occasion, he estimated that he had raped 15 women), his criminal record included only convictions for grand larceny and burglary in Kansas in 1970 and 1971, and menacing in Colorado in 1979. In 1982, Davis was convicted of raping the 15-year-old daughter of a friend of his second wife at knifepoint and sentenced to eight years in prison. During his imprisonment, he struck up a correspondence with Rebecca Fincham and the couple married in 1984 while Davis was still in prison. He was released in 1985, after which he and Fincham moved to Byers, Colorado.

== Murder, trial, and conviction ==
On July 21, 1986, Davis and Fincham kidnapped their neighbor, 34-year-old Virginia May, in front of her children. They subsequently drove her to a deserted field, where Davis raped May and then shot her 14 times with a rifle. At trial, Davis confessed to the murder, despite the advice of his attorneys; he was sentenced to death exactly one year after the murder, on July 21, 1987. The jury took three hours to reach a verdict. In a separate trial, Fincham was sentenced to life in prison.

Davis alternately encouraged and suspended appeals of his death sentence, which was upheld by state courts in 1990 and federal courts in 1995. During the time he sat on Colorado's death row, Davis was able to reunite with some of his family, including his first two wives, and, according to some witnesses, experienced a dramatic spiritual conversion during his final years.

Then-Governor of Colorado Roy Romer refused to grant clemency to Davis, stating, in part: "[T]here undoubtedly has been some rehabilitation of his character and his demeanor. But I do not believe that whatever remorse or rehabilitation that is displayed here justifies reaching that extraordinary event that would cause this governor to give him clemency."

== Execution ==
Davis's last meal before his execution was ice cream. Shortly before his execution, Davis also requested a cigarette; as a smoking ban was in place in Colorado prisons, his request was denied. He made no final statement before being executed by lethal injection.

Davis was pronounced dead at the Colorado State Penitentiary at 8:33 p.m. on October 13, 1997. As his death was the first execution carried out by the state of Colorado in approximately three decades, the event received intense media coverage; about 200 death penalty protesters gathered outside the prison as Davis was executed, as did a smaller group of death penalty supporters.

Davis was the only person executed in Colorado between 1968 and 2020, when the state of Colorado abolished capital punishment. His execution was the 417th carried out in the United States since capital punishment was resumed in 1977.

Davis' wife, Rebecca Fincham, died in prison in 2008 while serving a life sentence for May's murder.

== See also ==
- Capital punishment in Colorado
- Capital punishment in the United States
- List of most recent executions by jurisdiction
- List of people executed in Colorado
- List of people executed in the United States in 1997
- Volunteer (capital punishment)

Executions carried out in Colorado
Preceded by Luis Monge June 2, 1967	Gary Lee Davis; October 13, 1997	Succeeded by none
Executions carried out in the United States
Preceded by Ricky Lee Green – Texas October 8, 1997	Gary Lee Davis – Colorado; October 13, 1997	Succeeded by Alan Bannister – Missouri October 24, 1997
