= 1993 Aurora, Colorado shooting =

Mass shooting in Colorado, U.S.

- Location: 39.6754°N 104.8448°W; 12293 East Iliff Avenue, Aurora, Colorado, U.S.
- Date: December 14, 1993; 32 years ago 10:00 p.m. (MST; UTC−06:00)
- Attack type: Mass shooting; mass murder; workplace shooting
- Weapon: .25 caliber semi-automatic pistol
- Deaths: 4
- Injuries: 1
- Perpetrator: Nathan Jerard Dunlap
- Motive: Revenge for being fired from Chuck E. Cheese
- Verdict: Guilty on all counts
- Convictions: Dunlap: First-degree murder (4 counts); Attempted first-degree murder; Robbery; Burglary; Lechman: Accessory to murder
- Convicted: Nathan Dunlap, Tracie Lechman

On December 14, 1993, four employees were shot and killed, and a fifth employee was critically injured at a Chuck E. Cheese's (formerly a ShowBiz Pizza Place) restaurant in Aurora, Colorado, United States. The perpetrator, 19-year-old Nathan Jerard Dunlap, a former employee of the restaurant, was frustrated about being fired five months prior to the shooting and sought revenge by committing the attack. He fled the scene of the shooting with stolen money and restaurant items. At the time, the Chuck E. Cheese massacre was the deadliest mass shooting in Colorado, before being surpassed by the Columbine High School massacre in 1999.

Dunlap was found guilty of four counts of first-degree murder, attempted murder, and other charges, and was sentenced to death by lethal injection on May 17, 1996. A judge initially set an execution date for him in August 2013, but Colorado governor John Hickenlooper signed a temporary reprieve that postponed Dunlap's execution date.

Dunlap's death sentence was commuted to life in prison without parole in 2020 after Colorado abolished the death penalty.

== Shooting ==
Nathan Dunlap arrived at his friends' house at around 11 AM, with a .25-caliber semiautomatic pistol. He told his friends that he was "Going to the Chuck E. Cheese restaurant to kill the people."

Nathan Dunlap entered the restaurant at 9:30 p.m., where he ordered a ham and cheese sandwich and played an arcade game. He then hid in a restroom at about 9:50 p.m. He exited the restroom after closing at 10:05 p.m. and shot five employees with the same .25-caliber semiautomatic pistol.

Dunlap first shot Sylvia Crowell, 19, who was cleaning the salad bar, from close range near the right ear. Ben Grant, 17, was fatally shot near the left eye as he was vacuuming. Dunlap then forced Colleen O'Connor, 17, who was doing closing duties in the dining room, onto her knees and fatally shot her once through the top of her head as she pleaded for her life. Bobby Stephens, 20, the lone survivor of the shooting, returned to the restaurant after taking a smoke break outside, thinking the noise he heard from inside the restaurant were children popping balloons nearby.

As Stephens walked into the kitchen and unloaded utensils into the dishwasher, Dunlap barged through the kitchen doors, raised the handgun at him, and fired a shot that struck Stephens in the jaw. Stephens fell to the floor and crawled away to the exit after Dunlap walked away. Dunlap then forced Marge Kohlberg, 50, the store manager, to unlock the safe. After she opened it, Dunlap shot her in the ear. As he was taking the cash out of the safe, Dunlap fired a second fatal shot through Kohlberg's other ear after he noticed she was still moving. The manager who fired Dunlap was not present at the restaurant. Six spent shell casings were found inside the restaurant.

Stephens escaped through a back door and walked to the nearby Mill Pond apartment complex, where he pounded on a door to alert someone that he and others had been shot at the restaurant. Stephens was hospitalized at Denver General Hospital in fair condition. As authorities arrived on the scene, they found two bodies in the restaurant's hallway, a third in a room off the hallway, and the fourth in the manager's office. Crowell was sent to Denver General Hospital, where she was declared brain dead. She died from her injuries the next day at Aurora Regional Medical Center.

Dunlap fled the scene with $1,500 worth of cash and game tokens he stole from inside the restaurant. He was arrested at his mother's apartment twelve hours later.

== Perpetrator ==
Nathan Dunlap
- Born: Nathan Jerard Dunlap; April 8, 1974 (age 52); Chicago, Illinois, U.S.
- Status: Incarcerated at Colorado State Penitentiary
- Convictions: First-degree murder (4 counts); Attempted murder Robbery; Theft
- Penalty: Death plus 108 years; commuted to life imprisonment without possibility of parole

Nathan Jerard Dunlap (born April 8, 1974) was raised by his adoptive father and biological mother, who married each other when Dunlap was a few months old. He had never met his biological father. Dunlap was born in Chicago, Illinois, but shortly after Nathan's birth, his biological mother was hospitalized in Waukegan, Illinois, and Nathan was sent to a foster home elsewhere in a Chicago-area suburb. At age two in 1976, Dunlap briefly lived in Memphis, Tennessee, before moving to Michigan later that year. It wasn't until age 10 that Dunlap moved to Colorado in 1984. In his later years, both his parents had a history of abusing their children. Dunlap's adoptive father, Jerry, who had played professional football and weighed over 300 pounds, was most violent towards Dunlap. Jerry would throw Nathan against walls, hurl him down hallways, hit him with objects, and punch him.

Dunlap's mother struggled with mental health issues and was later diagnosed with both schizophrenia and bipolar disorder in 1987. At least twice in Dunlap's junior high school years, Dunlap attempted suicide. When Dunlap was 14, his adoptive father asked the psychologist at Overland High School to evaluate him, and testing revealed signs of hypomania. No further treatment or formal diagnostic was applied.

He committed several armed robberies at age 15 in 1989, using a golf club and then firearms. He spent time incarcerated at a juvenile detention center, and due to an erratic episode, he was sent to a psychiatric hospital. When released, he began selling drugs. Dunlap was arrested five times on misdemeanor offenses in 1993.

Dunlap began working at the restaurant as a cook in May 1993 and was fired in July after a disagreement he had with his supervisor over schedule hours. Acquaintances of Dunlap said he was frustrated over the firing, and told a former coworker that he planned to "get even" about the termination. In September 1993, Dunlap began exhibiting signs of hypomania. He stopped eating and sleeping, and also became progressively more wild-eyed and unkempt.

== Legal proceedings ==
Dunlap was found guilty of four counts of first-degree murder, attempted murder, robbery, and burglary in 1996. On May 17 of that year, Dunlap was sentenced to death and an additional 108 years. During his sentencing he swore repeatedly in an outburst that lasted for three minutes.

In 2008, Dunlap filed a habeas corpus petition with the federal district court, arguing that his trial attorney was ineffective by not presenting a defense on his mental health issues and child abuse. In August 2010, this federal appeal was rejected. Senior U.S. District Judge John L. Kane wrote that Dunlap was fairly tried, competently represented, and justifiably sentenced to death.

On April 16, 2012, the 10th Circuit Court of Appeals denied Dunlap's appeal of his death sentence. Dunlap's lawyers argued before the 10th Circuit that Dunlap's trial lawyers were negligent during the sentencing, by not providing evidence that Dunlap suffers from a mental illness. They argued that if the jurors heard evidence of Dunlap's mental illness this would spare Dunlap from being sentenced to death.

On May 1, 2013, Judge William Sylvester announced that the execution date for Dunlap would be in mid-August 2013.

On May 22, 2013, Dunlap's execution was put on hold, as Colorado Governor John Hickenlooper decided against executing Dunlap or granting him clemency and instead signed a "temporary reprieve" in 2013. The reprieve meant that as long as Hickenlooper was governor, Dunlap would not likely be executed. According to Hickenlooper, one of the reasons that he did not choose full clemency was because Dunlap would have to remain segregated from the rest of the prison population. Groups, including the NAACP, contacted Hickenlooper requesting the sparing of Dunlap's life, arguing that the death penalty is disproportionately imposed on African Americans and Hispanics. The reprieve also meant that unless a governor issued a new executive order, the status of the execution and clemency request would remain on hold. Hickenlooper was constitutionally limited from running for a third term.

On November 6, 2018, Jared Polis was elected governor. During the campaign, Polis said he intended to sign a bill repealing the death penalty in Colorado. Regarding the Dunlap case, Polis said he had no problem following the current law, and that he did not think it was appropriate to comment on a specific case during a campaign before actually becoming governor and reviewing the case to make an informed decision.

On March 23, 2020, Polis signed a bill repealing the death penalty. Polis also commuted the sentences for all three men on death row, including Dunlap, to life without parole. Dunlap remains incarcerated at the Colorado State Penitentiary in Cañon City.

== See also ==
- Capital punishment in Colorado
