= Luis Monge (mass murderer) =

Puerto Rican murderer who received the death penalty in the U.S.

Luis José Monge
- Monge on September 23, 1964
- Born: June 21, 1918; Puerto Rico
- Died: June 2, 1967 (aged 48); Colorado State Prison, Colorado, U.S.
- Known for: Being the last inmate executed prior to Furman v. Georgia
- Status: Executed by gas chamber
- Motive: To prevent the exposure of his sexual abuse of his daughter
- Conviction: First degree murder
- Penalty: Death

Details
- Date: June 29, 1963
- Location: Denver, Colorado
- Killed: 4
- Weapons: Steel bar, knife, hands

Luis José Monge (June 21, 1918 – June 2, 1967) was a convicted mass murderer who was executed in the gas chamber at Colorado State Penitentiary in 1967. Monge was the last inmate to be executed before an unofficial moratorium on executions that lasted for more than four years while most death penalty cases were on appeal, culminating in the U.S. Supreme Court decision in Furman v. Georgia in 1972, invalidating all existing death penalty statutes as written.

== Murders ==
Monge, a Denver, Colorado, insurance salesman, was a native of Puerto Rico who grew up in New York. He was convicted and sentenced to death for murdering his wife, Leonarda, and three of their ten children after she discovered he was sexually abusing their 13-year-old daughter, Diann Kissell. The murders were committed on June 29, 1963.

Monge's murder victims were Leonarda, Alan (aged 6), Vincent (aged 4), and Teresa (11 months old). Immediately after the four murders, Monge called the police and admitted his guilt.

The alleged motive for the murders was "to prevent exposure of sex crimes committed by the defendant with his own children." He beat his wife to death with a steel bar, stabbed Teresa, choked Vincent, and bludgeoned Alan with the steel bar.

He had no prior felony convictions; in 1961, however, he abandoned his family for two months and served a short jail sentence in Louisiana for vagrancy.

== Execution ==
After Monge had pleaded not guilty by reason of insanity, psychiatrists evaluated him and found him to be sane. He then insisted on pleading guilty to first-degree murder. A jury that was convened for the penalty phase of the trial recommended a death sentence, and Monge's conviction and sentence were affirmed on appeal. In January 1966, Governor John Arthur Love suspended all executions in Colorado, pending a referendum on capital punishment by voters. On November 8, 1966, the voters decided to retain the death penalty by a three-to-one margin. In March 1967, Monge attracted national attention when he asked a Denver court to allow him to be hanged at high noon on the front steps of the Denver City and County Building. This request was denied.

The following month, Monge fired his attorneys and directed that no attempts should be made to save his life. He gave up all of his appeals and asked to be executed. Nonetheless, his surviving children appealed for clemency. Doctors again evaluated Monge's mental status and found him mentally competent for execution. A week before his death, Monge shared a final meal with his surviving seven children. On the eve of the execution, some seventy members of the Colorado Council to Abolish Capital Punishment gathered on the steps of the state capitol building in Denver in a rally to protest the execution. On June 2, 1967, Monge was executed at the age of 48 in the state's gas chamber. Upon his death, and according to his wishes, one of Monge's corneas was transplanted to a teenaged reformatory inmate.

Monge was buried in Greenwood Pioneer Cemetery in Cañon City, Colorado in the pauper's section set aside for deceased inmates of the state penitentiary. His grave lies a few feet from that of John Bizup Jr., a convicted murderer executed in 1964. The metal marker indicating Monge's grave has been marred with bullet holes. The Colorado gas chamber, retired after Monge's execution, is now an exhibit at the Museum of Colorado Prisons in Cañon City.

== Moratorium ==
Opponents of capital punishment, in an attempt to abolish the death penalty, waged a national litigation campaign that ultimately found its way to the Supreme Court of the United States. The Court agreed to review a series of cases challenging that the death penalty was unconstitutional. While the Supreme Court reviewed these cases, lower courts in all states stayed all pending executions, thereby creating a de facto moratorium on death sentences throughout the nation. The period of this "unofficial" moratorium on capital punishment began on June 2, 1967, with the execution of Luis Monge in Colorado, and continued through the 1972 Supreme Court decision in Furman v. Georgia, which invalidated death penalty statutes in every retentionist state and led to a nearly ten-year moratorium on the death penalty. The moratorium would end nearly ten years later on January 17, 1977, with the execution of Gary Gilmore in Utah.

== Execution in context ==
Luis Jose Monge's was the last execution both in Colorado and in the United States prior to the 1972 Supreme Court decision in Furman v. Georgia. It would be almost ten years before any state would carry out another execution; the moratorium ended with the 1976 Supreme Court decision in Gregg v. Georgia, in which the Supreme Court upheld several state's death penalty statutes, and when the state of Utah executed Gary Gilmore on January 17, 1977. Monge's execution was therefore the last to take place before what historians consider to be the start of the "modern era" of the death penalty, which began with the Gregg ruling and Gilmore's execution.

The state of Colorado itself took 30 years before it would do so in the execution of Gary Lee Davis, on October 13, 1997. Monge's was one of only two executions to occur in the United States in 1967. His was also the last execution by gas chamber in Colorado.

== See also ==
- Capital punishment in Colorado
- Capital punishment in the United States
- Furman v. Georgia
- Gas chamber
- Gregg v. Georgia
- List of people executed in Colorado
- List of people executed in the United States, 1965–1972
- Volunteer (capital punishment)

Executions carried out in Colorado
Preceded by John Bizup August 14, 1964	Luis Monge; June 2, 1967	Succeeded by Gary Lee Davis October 13, 1997
Executions carried out in the United States
Preceded by Aaron Mitchell – California April 12, 1967	Luis Monge – Colorado; June 2, 1967	Succeeded by Gary Gilmore – Utah January 17, 1977
