= William Lee Neal =

American serial killer and con artist

- Born: William Lee Neal; October 7, 1955 (age 71); Fort Belvoir, Virginia
- Other name: Wild Bill Cody
- Occupation: Retired military soldier
- Years active: 1998
- Spouses: 4
- Children: 2
- Relatives: 1 brothers 3 sisters
- Motive: Confidence tricks Rape
- Convictions: First degree murder (3 counts); First degree sexual assault (2 counts); Second degree kidnapping (2 counts); 1 count menacing
- Penalty: Death; commuted to life imprisonment

Details
- Victims: 3 killed 1 raped
- Date: June–July 1998
- Country: United States
- State: Colorado
- Weapon: Splitting maul
- Date apprehended: July 1998
- Imprisoned at: Colorado State Penitentiary

William Lee "Cody" Neal (born October 7, 1955) is an American convicted serial killer, rapist, and con artist. Neal was sentenced to death for the murders of Rebecca Holberton, Candace Walters, Angela Fife, and the rape of a fourth woman Neal held against her will, all in 1998.

== Early life and crimes ==
Neal was born the second of 2 sons and also had 3 sisters. He was named after a family pastor, William Lee, and one of his uncles was a minister. His father was an Air Force chief warrant officer who retired when Neal was nine. His mother, who died from cancer in 1995, was regarded as his family member he loved most and the one who kept his father in check, his father devoting to her in turn. Neal considered work in the FBI or as a minister, crediting his father taking him to museums in D.C. and his devotion to Christ through his uncle. He joined the army when he was seventeen.

== Murders and arrest ==
According to his sister, Neal was questioned by the FBI for the abduction, rape, and murder of a girl at a New York gas station in the 1980s, before being ultimately cleared as a suspect. No further specific details of the case have been publicly revealed.

At the end of June 1998, Neal bought nylon rope, duct tape, and a splitting maul. Neal lured with the promises of repaying his debts and promising business deals, first killing Rebecca on June 30, then Candace on July 2. He wanted to cover them both with blankets, which only Rebecca consented to, and then he killed them by smashing the maul into their heads, draining their bank accounts after they were dead.

Neal had seduced two roommates, "Suzanne" and "Beth" (their real names were never publicly released), after meeting them at a bar. He was also seeing Angela Fite and went into business with her. Neal asked Suzanne to accompany him allegedly to meet with lawyers for his work, around the same time he proposed to Beth and threw a lavish celebration. On the night of July 5, Neal abducted Suzanne, blindfolded and gagged her, and tied her to a mattress. He cut off her clothes, made her feel a piece of one woman's skull, and even kicked her body to show she was dead. After molesting Suzanne, Neal left and threatened her into not saying or doing anything. He then abducted and killed Angela in front of Suzanne, then untied Suzanne and orally raped her at gunpoint. Neal then took Suzanne to Beth, placed a gun and tape recorder on a table, and ran the recorder to confess to his crimes for two hours. Neal ordered Suzanne, Beth, and a friend of theirs to delay calling the police, but Suzanne called them anyway.

Neal, while at large, responded to calls from law and justice and refused to surrender without consulting an attorney. With the risk of Neal posing a danger to more people, Deputy District Attorney Mark Pautler called Neal and stated that he was a defense attorney, lying, to get Neal's surrender. Neal also provided confessions to his crimes over the phone. Neal eventually agreed to a surrender and was arrested, but Pautler faced a disciplinary hearing for his actions. Pautler was ruled to have beyond boundaries of conduct, having provided Neal false information and not informed him of his rights, and sentenced to a three-month suspension of his license.

== Trial and sentences ==
Neal pled guilty to two counts of first-degree murder, two counts of first-degree sexual assault, and seven other charges, ranging from kidnapping to menacing. His hours-long confession was played to demonstrate his personality in the sentencing phase. He appealed against the chance of him being sentenced to death, but he was given a death sentence in September 1999. It was commuted to life in prison in 2003.

The families of the murdered women continue to support each other, and Neal's ex-wives keep in steady communication with each other.

== See also ==
- List of serial killers in the United States
