= Sault-au-Cochon, Quebec =

Sault-au-Cochon
- Unorganized territory
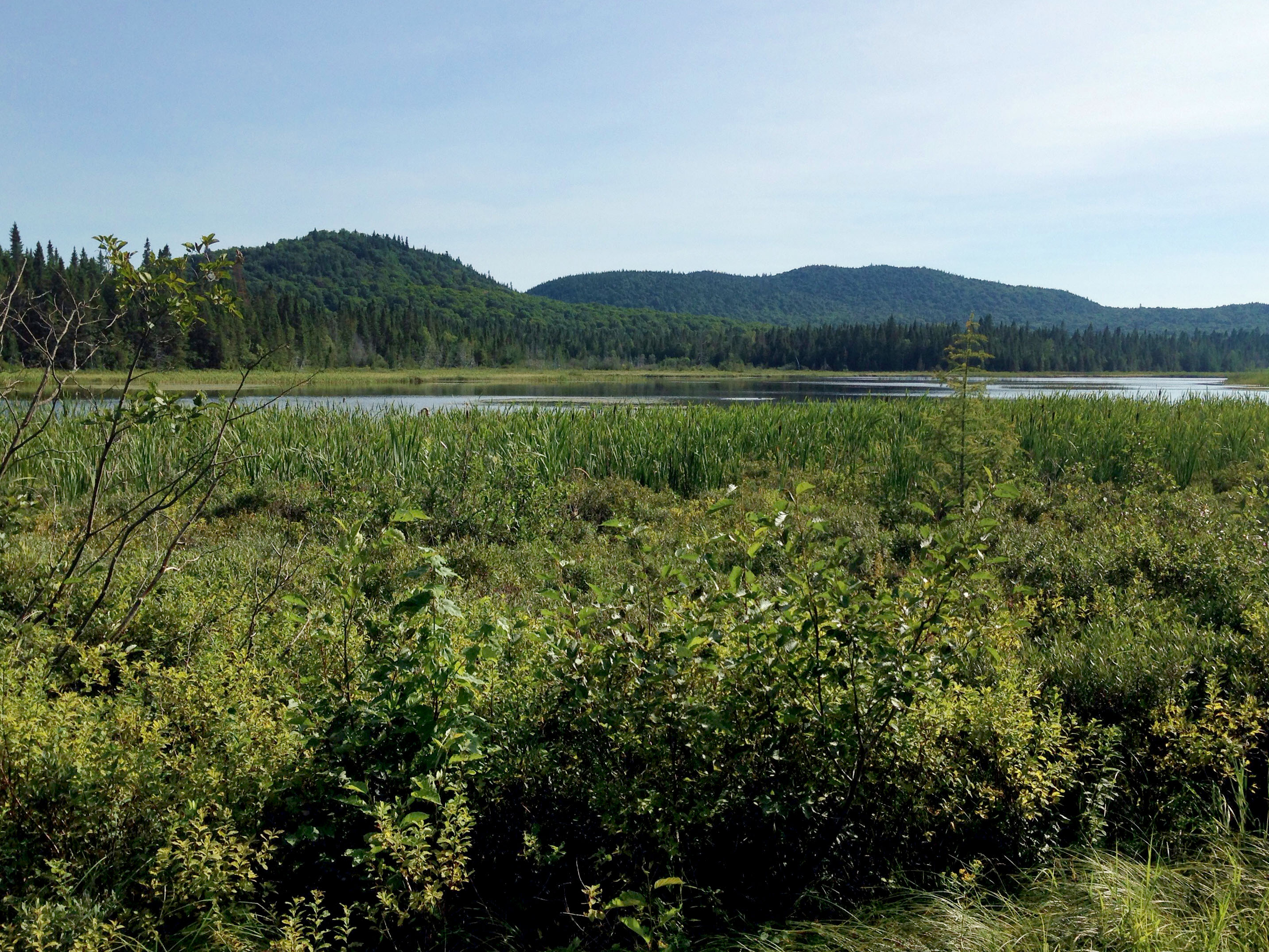

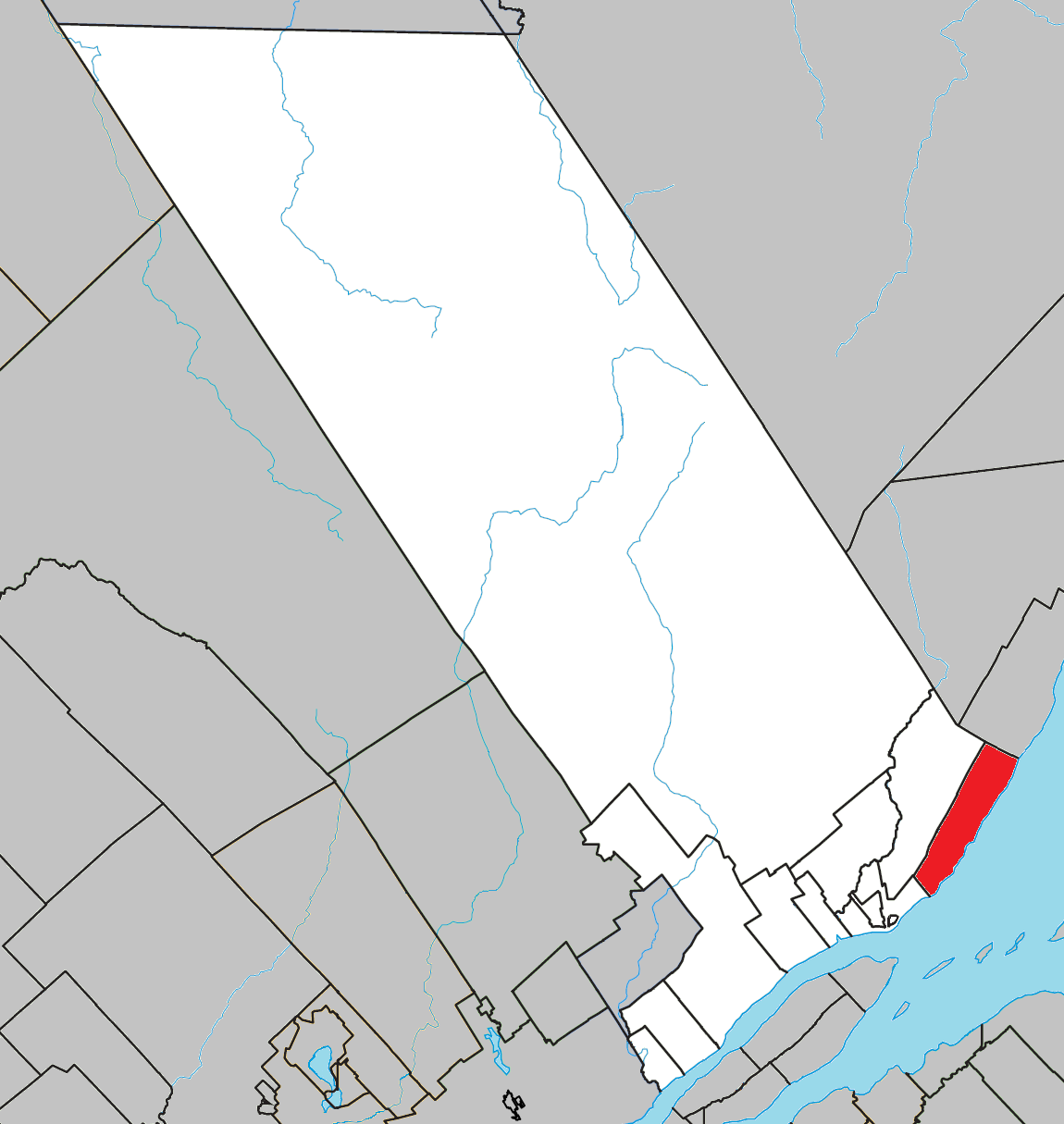
- Location within La Côte-de-Beaupré RCM

- Location in central Quebec
- Coordinates: 47°12′N 70°38′W
- Country: Canada
- Province: Quebec
- Region: Capitale-Nationale
- RCM: La Côte-de-Beaupré
- Constituted: unspecified

Government
  - Federal riding: Montmorency—Charlevoix
  - Prov. riding: Charlevoix–Côte-de-Beaupré

Area
  - Total: 71.95 km^{2} (27.78 sq mi)
  - Land: 70.18 km^{2} (27.10 sq mi)

Population (2021)
  - Total: 0
  - Density: 0/km^{2} (0/sq mi)
- Time zone: UTC−5 (EST)
  - Summer (DST): UTC−4 (EDT)
- Highways: No major routes

Sault-au-Cochon (French pronunciation: [sot‿o kɔʃɔ̃]) is an unorganized territory in the Capitale-Nationale region of Quebec, Canada, in the La Côte-de-Beaupré Regional County Municipality. It is an unpopulated and undeveloped stretch of shoreline along the Saint Lawrence River that encompasses the promontory from Cape Tourmente to Petite-Rivière-Saint-François.

== History ==
The Charlevoix Railway passes through the territory right along the Saint Lawrence River. The territory is named after a former rail stop on this line located about halfway between Cape Tourmente and Baie-Saint-Paul, or about 80 kilometers (50 mi) north-east of Quebec City (47°12′01″N 70°38′25″W). The stop is situated the mouth of a small stream that rushes down the steep slope of the promontory. In 1676 it was reported that the stream used to be called Gouffre ("Chasm") River but had been given the name Sault au Cochon since. This name comes from the presence of Porpoise and Beluga whale in the Saint Lawrence River that were formerly called cochons de mer ("sea pigs") in French. The name "Saut au Cochon" was used by Jean Deshayes on his map of 1695, and it was thereafter also applied to the surrounding interior lands that were not part of the seigneurial domain of the Quebec Seminary.

The territory has been used for logging and it was home to a sawmill in the 1930s. A small section of old-growth forest remains, some 15 kilometers (9.3 mi) north-east of Sainte-Anne-de-Beaupré (47°07′51″N 70°43′07″W). It covers 62 hectares and is characterized by Yellow birch and Sugar maple, some of which are up to 320 years old and have a diameter of 90 centimeters (35 in).

=== Canadian Pacific Air Lines Flight 108 ===
On September 9, 1949, a Canadian Pacific Air Lines DC-3, en route from L'Ancienne-Lorette to Baie-Comeau, exploded and crashed at Sault-au-Cochon, killing 23 persons (19 passengers and 4 crew members). It was the result of a homemade bomb made by Genereux Ruest, a watchmaker in Quebec who had placed it on board with the help of his sister Marguerite Ruest Pitre. The plot was hatched by one Albert Guay, a jeweler in Quebec who wanted to get rid of his wife Rita (née Morel), one of the passengers, and cash-in an insurance policy worth CAD$10,000 ($135,000 today). All three were found guilty and hanged in the early 1950s.

== Demographics ==
Historical census populations – Sault-au-Cochon, Quebec

Year	Pop.	±%
1991	0	—
1996	0	0.00%
2001	0	0.00%
2006	0	0.00%

Year	Pop.	±%
2011	0	0.00%
2016	0	0.00%
2021	0	0.00%

Source: Statistics Canada

== See also ==
- List of unorganized territories in Quebec
