= United Air Lines Flight 629 =

Flight that exploded over Longmont, Colorado in November 1955

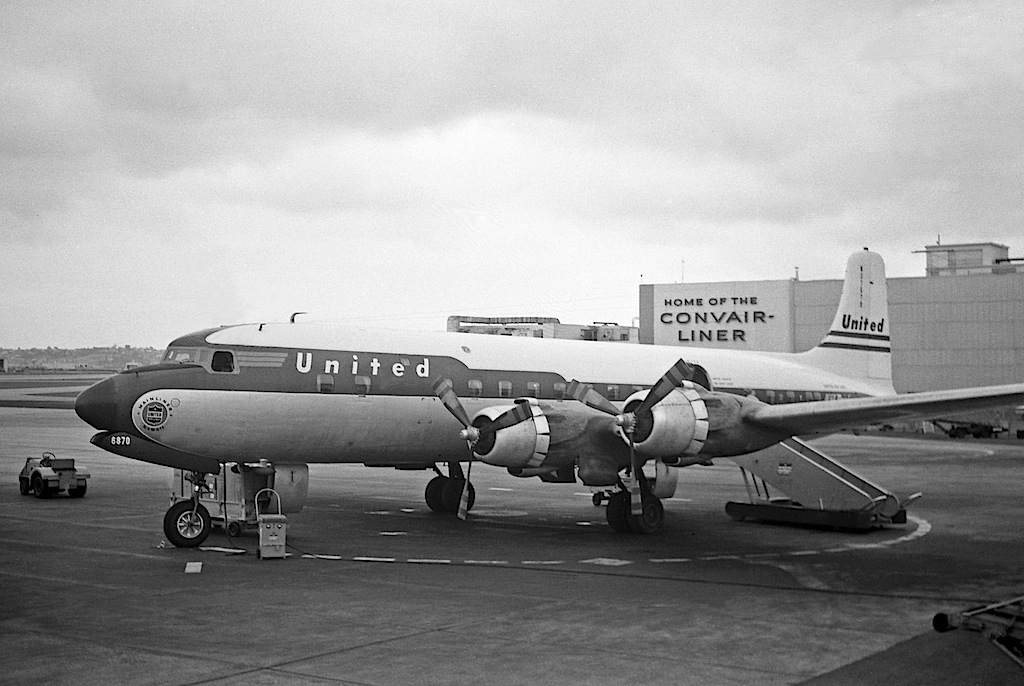
- A United DC-6B similar to the aircraft involved

Bombing
- Date: November 1, 1955
- Summary: Bombing
- Site: 8 miles east of Longmont, Colorado, U.S.; 40°12′0.51″N 104°57′21.96″W

Aircraft
- Aircraft type: Douglas DC-6B
- Aircraft name: Mainliner Denver
- Operator: United Airlines
- Call sign: UNITED 629
- Registration: N37559
- Flight origin: LaGuardia Airport, New York City, New York
- 1st stopover: Chicago Midway International Airport, Chicago, Illinois
- 2nd stopover: Stapleton International Airport, Denver, Colorado
- Last stopover: Portland International Airport, Portland, Oregon
- Destination: Seattle-Tacoma International Airport, Seattle, Washington
- Occupants: 44
- Passengers: 39
- Crew: 5
- Fatalities: 44
- Survivors: 0

United Air Lines Flight 629, registration N37559 and dubbed Mainliner Denver, was a Douglas DC-6B aircraft that was blown up on November 1, 1955, by a dynamite bomb placed in the checked luggage. The explosion occurred over Weld County, Colorado, United States, 8 miles (13 km) east of Longmont, at 7:03 p.m. local time, while the airplane was en route from Denver to Portland, Oregon, and Seattle, Washington. All 39 passengers and 5 crew members on board were killed in the explosion and crash.

Investigators determined that John Gilbert Graham was responsible for bombing the airplane in a bid to kill his mother as revenge for his childhood and to obtain a large life insurance payout. Within fifteen months of the explosion, Graham—who already had an extensive criminal record—was tried, convicted, and executed for the crime. It is the deadliest act of mass murder in Colorado’s history.

== Aircraft and crew ==
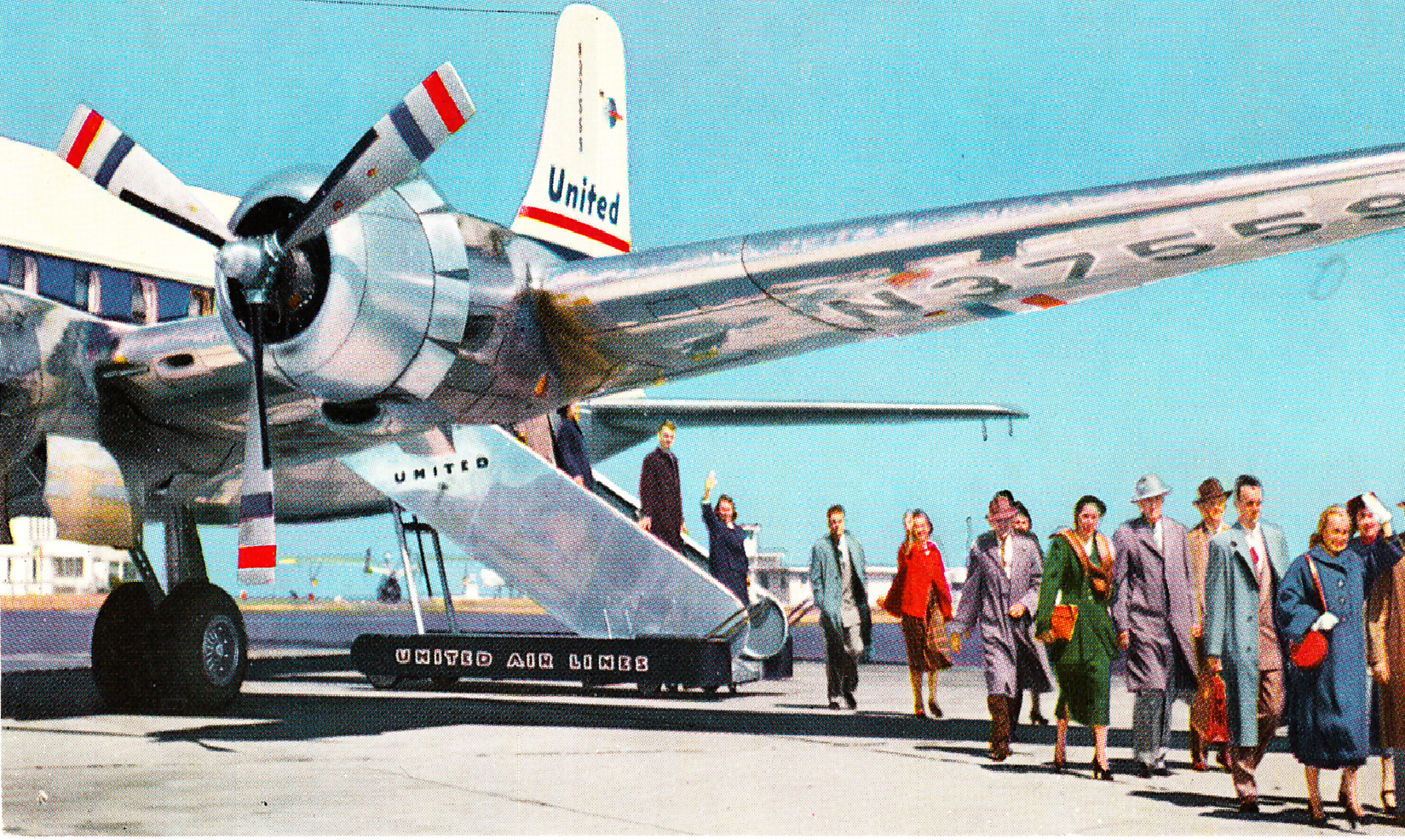
Postcard photo of the aircraft involved, N37559

The aircraft involved was a Douglas DC-6B, registration N37559. It had accumulated a total of 11,949 flight hours at the time of the crash. The DC-6 was powered by four Pratt & Whitney CB-16 "Double Wasp" engines, each developing 2400 horsepower at takeoff.

The crew consisted of Captain Lee H. Hall (age 41), First Officer Donald A. White (26), Flight Engineer Samuel F. Arthur (38) and two stewardesses, Jacqueline Hinds and Peggy Ann Peddicord. Two other UA stewardesses, Barbara J. Cruse and Sally Ann Scofield, were also on board, traveling on vacation. Captain Hall was a World War II veteran and a highly experienced pilot, having accumulated 10,086 flight hours, of which 703 were in the DC-6B. First Officer White had accumulated 3,578 flight hours, of which 1,062 were in the DC-6B. Flight Engineer Arthur had accumulated 1,995 flight hours, of which 336 were in the DC-6B.

== Flight and explosion ==
United Airlines Flight 629 had originated at New York City's La Guardia Airport on November 1, 1955, and made a scheduled stop in Chicago before continuing to Denver's Stapleton Airfield, landing eleven minutes late at 6:11 p.m. At Denver the aircraft was refueled with 3,400 US gallons (2,800 imp gal; 13,000 L) of aviation gasoline and had a crew replacement. Captain Hall assumed command of the flight for the segments to Portland and Seattle.

Flight 629 took off at 6:52 p.m. and at 6:56 p.m. made its last transmission, stating it was passing the Denver omni. Seven minutes later, Stapleton air traffic controllers saw two bright lights suddenly appear in the sky north-northwest of the airport. Both lights were observed for 30–45 seconds, and both fell to the ground at roughly the same speed. The controllers then saw a very bright flash originating at or near the ground, intense enough to illuminate the base of the clouds 10,000 feet (3,000 m) above the source of the flash. Upon observing the mysterious lights, the controllers quickly determined there were no aircraft in distress and contacted all aircraft flying in the area; all flights were quickly accounted for except for Flight 629.

Numerous telephone calls soon began coming in from farmers and other residents near Longmont, who reported loud explosions and fiery debris falling from the night sky—the remains of Flight 629. Ground searchers who reached the crash site determined that all 44 people aboard the DC-6B had been killed. The debris from the accident was scattered across 6 sq mi (16 km^{2}) of Weld County.

Extensive in-air breakup of the entire aircraft had occurred, and major portions of the wings, engines, and center sections were found in two craters 150 feet (46 m) apart. The large load of fuel ignited on impact, according to fire patterns. The fires were so intense that despite efforts to extinguish them they continued to burn for three days.

There was early speculation that something other than a mechanical problem or pilot error was responsible for the crash, given the magnitude of the in-air explosion. The November 2 edition of The New York Times reported a witness to the tragedy describing what he heard: "Conrad Hopp, a farmer who lives near the crash scene, said he and members of his family 'heard a big explosion—it sounded like a big bomb went off and I ran out and I saw a big fire right over the cattle corral. I hollered back to my wife that she'd better call the fire department and ambulance because a plane was going to crash. Then I turned around and it blew up in the air.'"

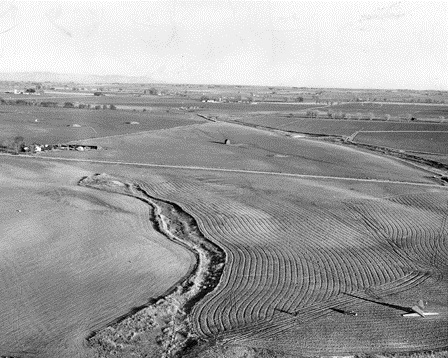
Colorado farm where the empennage of United Air Lines Flight 629 was found

== Victims ==
All 44 people aboard the aircraft were killed. The ages of the victims ranged from 13 months to 81 years.

== Investigation ==
The investigation by the Civil Aeronautics Board (CAB), led by Jack Parshall, determined that the aircraft began to disintegrate near the empennage, or tail, and that the aft fuselage had been shattered by a force strong enough to cause extreme fragmentation of that part of the aircraft. The explosion had been so intense that investigators thought it unlikely to have been caused by any aircraft system or component. There was also a strong smell of explosives on items from the number 4 baggage compartment (which was at the back).

Suspicions that a bomb had been placed in luggage loaded aboard the aircraft were fueled by the discovery of four pieces of an unusual grade of sheet metal, each covered in a gray soot. Further testing of the cargo pit showed that each piece was contaminated with chemicals known to be byproducts of a dynamite explosion, the origin of which was believed to be a passenger's luggage. The Federal Bureau of Investigation (FBI), certain that the aircraft had been brought down by a bomb, performed background checks on the passengers.

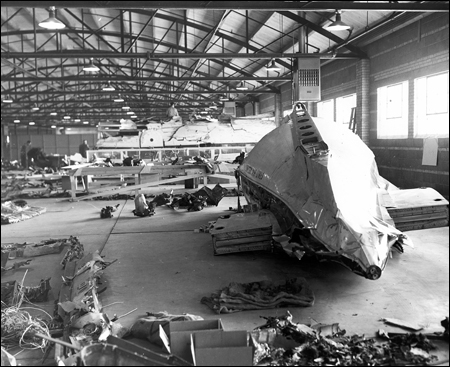
The wreckage of United Flight 629 was carefully laid out in a Denver warehouse after its bombing.

In the earlier stages of the investigation, investigators discovered that United Airlines management was locked in a dispute with a local airline union at the time of the crash, leading to the theory that the bombing of Flight 629 was an attempt to damage the airline's reputation; this theory was later excluded from the investigation.

Investigators then focused their efforts on Denver locals, speculating that they may have had personal enemies. A few passengers had purchased life insurance at the airport just before boarding. One such insuree, as well as local, was Daisie Eldora King, 53, a Denver businesswoman who was en route to Alaska to visit her daughter. When agents identified King's handbag, they found a number of newspaper clippings containing information about her son, John Gilbert Graham, who had been arrested on a forgery charge in Denver in 1951. Graham, who held a grudge against his mother for placing him in an orphanage as a child, was the beneficiary of both her life insurance policies and her will. Agents also discovered that one of King's restaurants, the Crown-A Drive-In in Denver, had been badly damaged in an explosion; Graham had insured the restaurant and then collected on the property insurance following the blast.

Agents subsequently searched Graham's house and automobile. In the garage they found wire and other bomb making parts that were identical to those found in the wreckage. They also found an additional $37,500 ($450,700 in 2025) in life insurance policies; however, King had not signed either these policies or those purchased at the airport, rendering them worthless. Graham told FBI agents that his mother had packed her own suitcase. However his wife, Gloria, revealed that Graham had wrapped a "present" for his mother on the morning of King's flight.

Faced with the mounting evidence and discrepancies in his story, on November 13, 1955, Graham finally confessed to having placed the bomb in his mother's suitcase, telling the police:

I then wrapped about three or four feet of binding cord around the sack of dynamite to hold the dynamite sticks in place around the caps. The purpose of the two caps was in case one of the caps failed to function and ignite the dynamite ... I placed the suitcase in the trunk of my car with another smaller suitcase...which my mother had packed to take with her on the trip.

== Trial ==
Authorities were shocked to discover that there was no federal statute on the books at the time (1955) that made it a crime to blow up aircraft. Therefore, on the day after Graham's confession, the district attorney moved swiftly to prosecute him via the simplest possible route: premeditated murder committed against a single victim—his mother, Daisie Eldora King. Thus, despite the number of victims killed on Flight 629 along with King, Graham was charged with only one count of first degree murder. It was the first trial in Colorado to be televised, and it was covered by Denver stations KLZ (now KMGH) and KBTV (now KUSA).

A motion by the defense attempted to have Graham's confession thrown out on the grounds that he had not been made aware of his rights prior to signing it, but the motion was denied. At his 1956 trial, Graham's defense was unable to counter the massive physical evidence and witnesses presented by the prosecution. He was convicted of the murder of his mother and, after a few short delays, was executed in the Colorado State Penitentiary gas chamber on January 11, 1957. One source has his final words being "Thanks, Warden", after Warden Tinsley patted him on the shoulder. TIME magazine quoted a lengthier statement, "As far as feeling remorse for those people, I don't. I can't help it. Everybody pays their way and takes their chances. That's just the way it goes."

== Legacy ==
As a result of the aircraft explosion, and because there was no law against bombing an aircraft, a bill was introduced and signed by President Dwight D. Eisenhower on July 14, 1956, which made the intentional bombing of a commercial airline illegal.

A memorial to those killed was unveiled on November 1, 2025 at the control tower of the now closed Stapleton Airport. A second memorial is planned at the main crash site, a farm that is being redeveloped for housing.

== In media ==
The bombing of United Flight 629 is depicted in the opening segment of the 1959 film The FBI Story, starring James Stewart and Vera Miles. Actor Nick Adams portrays Jack Graham. The bombing is also the subject of "Time Bomb", the fourth episode of season one of Investigation Discovery's series A Crime to Remember, which first aired December 3, 2013.

== Similar incidents ==
Flight 629 was the second known case of an airliner being destroyed by a bomb over the mainland United States. The first proven case of sabotage by bomb in the history of commercial aviation occurred on October 10, 1933, near Chesterton, Indiana, when the empennage was blasted from a Boeing 247, United Air Lines Flight 23, by a nitroglycerin bomb triggered by a timing device. The three crew members and four passengers were killed in the crash. No suspect was ever brought to trial in the case.

Graham was reportedly inspired to commit the crime by hearing of a similar incident, the Albert Guay affair in Quebec, in 1949.

Other crashes in North America caused by bombs include:

- National Airlines Flight 967 near Gulf Coast of Louisiana on November 16, 1959, killing 42
- National Airlines Flight 2511 over North Carolina on January 6, 1960, killing 34.
- Continental Airlines Flight 11 over Unionville, Missouri on May 22, 1962, killing 45.
- Canadian Pacific Air Lines Flight 21 near 100 Mile House, British Columbia on July 8, 1965, killing 52.

== See also ==
- Aviation safety
- Pan Am Flight 103
