= Timeline of airliner bombing attacks =

List of bombing attacks in commercial aviation

Commercial passenger airliners and cargo aircraft have been the subject of plots or attacks by bombs and fire since near the start of air travel. Many early bombings were suicides or schemes for insurance money, but in the latter part of the 20th century, assassination and political and religious militant terrorism became the dominant motive for attacking large jets. One list describes 86 cases related to airliner bombings, 53 of them resulting in deaths.

This is a chronological list of airliner bombing attacks. All entries on the list should have their own article. Explosions deemed to have not resulted from a bomb should not be included on this list. Bombings of small light aircraft and air taxis and failed bombing plots may not be notable for inclusion. Commercial airliners contracted to military use may be included on this list, but bombings of military transport aircraft should not.

For airliners brought down by gunfire or missile attacks rather than terrorist bombings or sabotage, see List of airliner shootdown incidents.

== List of incidents ==
Date	Flight or incident	Description	Casualties
10 October 1933	United Air Lines Flight 23	A Boeing 247 was destroyed by a bomb, with nitroglycerin as the probable explosive agent. A Chicago gangland murder was suspected, but the case remains unsolved. It is thought to be the first proven act of air sabotage in commercial aviation.	7
9 September 1949	Canadian Pacific Air Lines Flight 108	Joseph-Albert Guay sent a bomb made of dynamite as air cargo on a flight his wife was on. The explosion occurred after takeoff, leading to the death of all 19 passengers and 4 crew on the Douglas DC-3. Guay and his two accomplices, Madame le Corbeau and her brother, Généreux Ruest, were all tried for murder. They were each found guilty, sentenced to death, and executed.	23
13 April 1950	BEA Vigilant	Bomb detonated in the bathroom over the English Channel, blowing an 8 ft. by 4 ft. hole in the fuselage. Flight attendant was seriously injured. The pilot turned back and made an emergency landing at Northolt under the impression they had been struck by lightning. A French passenger was suspected of attempting suicide. The plane would be repaired and returned to service.	0
24 September 1952	Mexicana de Aviacion Flight 575	A man gave a bag to the flight attendant, saying it was for another passenger. The bag exploded 45 minutes into the flight, which had been delayed 40 minutes due to a shift change with another flight attendant. 5 injured; perpetrators sentenced to 40 years in prison.	0
11 April 1955	Kashmir Princess	An Air India Lockheed L-749A Constellation carrying delegates to the Bandung Conference was bombed in an unsuccessful attempt to assassinate Chinese Premier Zhou Enlai.	16
1 November 1955	United Air Lines Flight 629	Jack Gilbert Graham packed a bomb containing dynamite in a suitcase carried by his mother. The explosion and crash killed all 39 passengers and 5 crew members. Graham was convicted of first degree murder, sentenced to death, and executed.	44
25 July 1957	Western Air Lines N8406H	45 minutes after takeoff at 7500 feet, a passenger detonated a dynamite charge in the lavatory, killing himself and blowing a hole in the fuselage over Daggett, California. Made emergency landing at George AFB; aircraft repaired.	1
19 December 1957	SAGETA F-BAVH	Bomb exploded in the lavatory over Clermont-Ferrand, leaving a large hole in the fuselage. Emergency landing made at Lyon's Bron Airport 90 minutes later; aircraft repaired.	0
16 November 1959	National Airlines Flight 967	A Douglas DC-7B aircraft disappeared from radar over the Gulf of Mexico; 10 bodies and scattered debris were recovered but the main wreckage was never found. There has been speculation that the plane was brought down by a bomb; one theory is that a convicted criminal tricked another man into boarding in his place with luggage containing a bomb, so that his wife could collect on his life insurance. No probable cause for the crash was found.	42
8 September 1959	Mexicana de Aviacion Flight 621	A male passenger detonated a bomb at 11,000 feet, falling to his death. A small fire appeared but was put out, and the plane landed at Poza Rica. Aircraft repaired.	1
6 January 1960	National Airlines Flight 2511	A Douglas DC-6 flying from New York to Miami exploded and crashed in North Carolina, killing all on board. Passenger Julian Frank, who was under investigation for running a charity fraud and was heavily insured, is suspected of detonating a dynamite bomb.	34
28 April 1960	LAV YV-C-AFE	A Douglas DC-3 on the first leg of a flight from Caracas to Puerto Ayacucho with stopovers at Calabozo and Puerto Paez. Bomb detonated in cockpit, and the plane crashed near Calabozo.	13
10 May 1961	Air France Flight 406	A Lockheed L-1649 Starliner flying from Chad to France suffered an explosion and loss of tail control systems and crashed in Algeria, killing all on board. The explosion was believed to have been caused by a nitrocellulose-based bomb, possibly targeting officials of the Central African Republic.	78
22 May 1962	Continental Airlines Flight 11	A Boeing 707 exploded in the vicinity of Centerville, Iowa. Investigators determined that one of the passengers, Thomas G. Doty, had brought a bomb on board the aircraft after purchasing a life insurance policy. This was the first in-flight bombing of a jet airliner as well as the first jetliner suicide bombing.	45; one died shortly after rescue
8 December 1964	Aerolineas Abaroa CP-639	Crashed near the cemetery of a mining area on a 36-minute flight from Tipuani to La Paz. A heavily insured passenger had planted a dynamite charge.	17
8 July 1965	Canadian Pacific Air Lines Flight 21	CP 21 was a scheduled domestic flight from Vancouver, British Columbia, to Whitehorse, Yukon, via Prince George, Fort St. John, Fort Nelson and Watson Lake on Thursday, 8 July 1965. The Douglas DC-6B plane crashed near 100 Mile House, British Columbia, taking the lives of all 52 aboard. An inquest determined that the explosion was the result of a bomb, but as of 2018 the crime remains unsolved.	52
22 November 1966	Aden Airways crash at Wadi Rabtah	A DC-3 registered VR-AAN crashed at Wadi Rabtah while en route to Aden, Yemen. Investigations determined that a bomb had been placed to kill Amir Mohammed bin Said, Prime Minister of Wahidi (now part of Yemen), by his son Ali who wanted to succeed him as Amir.	30
29 May 1967	Aerocondor HK-757	Douglas DC-4 on a flight from Barranquilla to Bogota suffered a time bomb explosion at 6,000 feet, 55 minutes into the flight, leaving a 3-foot hole in the fuselage, over San Marcos. The plane continued to Bogota, landed without incident, and was repaired.	0
12 October 1967	Cyprus Airways Flight 284	A de Havilland Comet owned by British European Airways was flying between Greece and Cyprus when it broke-up and crashed, killing everyone on board. The cause was not determined, but traces of a military plastic explosive were found on a seat cushion. It is believed a bomb was intended to assassinate the Greek general in command of the Cyprus army who was to be aboard, but cancelled shortly before departure.	66
12 November 1967	American Airlines Boeing 727-23 (registration unknown)	Passenger flight from Chicago to San Diego. A small, crude homemade explosive went off in the rear baggage compartment, destroying 3 bags, over Alamosa. The plane landed safely 1 hour and 45 minutes later. Repaired (minor damage only). The perpetrator was arrested by the FBI.	0
19 November 1968	Continental N17325	Boeing 707-324C on a passenger flight from Los Angeles to Denver. An explosion went off in the lavatory while descending through FL240 over Gunnison, leading to a fire. The plane made a safe emergency landing; the passenger responsible, seen leaving the lavatory just before the explosion, was arrested by the FBI. Repaired.	0
5 August 1969	PAL Hawker Siddeley HS-748-209 Srs. 2 (registration unknown)	Passenger set off an explosive (possibly gelignite) in the lavatory and was blown out. Plane made safe landing and was repaired.	1
21 February 1970	Swissair Flight 330	A Convair CV-990 departing Zürich suffered an explosion, cabin smoke and loss of electrical power, and crashed, killing all aboard. Investigators determined that a barometric-triggered bomb had detonated in the aft cargo compartment. The Popular Front for the Liberation of Palestine - General Command, claimed responsibility, but Reuters later reported that the group denied involvement. On the same day, a bomb exploded aboard a Caravelle after takeoff from Frankfurt; this plane landed safely.	47
21 April 1970	Philippine Airlines Flight 215	A domestic Philippines flight of a Hawker Siddeley 748 broke-up and crashed, killing all on board. Investigators determined that a bomb in the lavatory exploded and separated the tail section from the aircraft.	36
10 October 1971	Aeroflot Flight 773	Shortly after takeoff from Vnukovo, a Tu-104 suffered an explosion that damaged the left side of the fuselage. The aircraft lost control, broke-up and crashed, killing all on board. A bomb had been placed on the floor inside the cabin between the cabin wall and a seat near fuselage frame 45.	25
20 November 1971	China Airlines Flight 825	Crashed into the sea near Penghu on a flight from Hong Kong to Taipei.	25
26 January 1972	JAT Flight 367	A Douglas DC-9 exploded in mid-air and crashed near Srbská Kamenice, Czechoslovakia (now the Czech Republic), killing all on board except flight attendant Vesna Vulović. Investigations determined that a homemade bomb had been placed in the forward cargo hold by Croatian terrorists.	27
8 March 1972	TWA N761TW	Bomb detonated in right rear of the cockpit of this Boeing 707-331 while parked at Las Vegas-McCarran International Airport. Earlier that day, a caller contacted the airline demanding $2000 and threatening to blow up their aircraft.	0
25 May 1972	LAN Chile CC-CAG	Boeing 727-116 en route to Miami from Panama City. Homemade pipe bomb detonated in the ice fountain service compartment 1 hour and 18 minutes after takeoff, leading to rapid decompression. Emergency landing made in Montego Bay at 13:10, minor damage repaired.	0
15 June 1972	Cathay Pacific Flight 700Z	A Convair 880 flying at 29,000 ft (8,800 m) exploded and broke-up over Pleiku, South Vietnam killing all on board. Investigation revealed that a bomb, hidden in a cosmetics case placed under a seat, brought down the aircraft. A Thai policeman, whose fiancée and daughter were on board, was suspected of placing the bomb. He was convicted, but was acquitted two years later owing to a lack of evidence.	81
16 August 1972	El Al 4X-ATT	Boeing 707-358C suffered minor damage from an explosive device in the aft baggage compartment at 14,500 feet above the Mediterranean, 10 minutes after takeoff from Rome. Plane returned immediately. The bomb, 200 grams of explosives put in a portable record player, was brought as luggage by two British girls who had been given it by two Arab friends.	0
19 March 1973	Air Vietnam XV-NUI	Crashed after an explosion in the cargo hold by the main wing spar on a flight from Saigon to Ban Me Thuot.	58
24 April 1973	April 1973 Aeroflot hijacking	An Aeroflot Tu-104 had departed Leningrad when a hijacking attempt occurred. The hijacker wanted to defect to Sweden. The crew made an emergency landing after returning to Leningrad. While on the ground, a flight engineer tried to disarm the hijacker. The bomb detonated, and killed both persons.	2
18 May 1973	Aeroflot Flight 109	An Aeroflot Tu-104 flying from Irkutsk to Chita was hijacked and demanded to be flown to China. The hijacker's bomb detonated and the airliner crashed near Lake Baikal, killing all on board.	82
26 August 1974	TWA Boeing 707	Explosive device in the aft baggage compartment malfunctioned on a flight from Athens, starting a fire; this was not discovered until after landing in Rome.	0
8 September 1974	TWA Flight 841 (1974)	A Boeing 707 crashed into the Ionian Sea after takeoff from Athens, killing all aboard. Investigators determined that a bomb in the cargo hold caused structural and control system failures, and the plane stalled and crashed.	88
3 June 1975	Philippine Air Lines RP-C1184	Flight was descending into Manila at FL200 when a bomb exploded in the right rear lavatory, creating a 1.3 × 4 m hole in the fuselage. Flight made emergency landing and was later repaired.	1
1 January 1976	Middle East Airlines Flight 438	A bomb exploded in the forward cargo bay of a Boeing 720B en route from Beirut, Lebanon to Dubai. The airliner broke-up and crashed, killing all aboard. The bombers were never identified. Lebanon was enduring a civil war at the time.	81
6 October 1976	Cubana de Aviación Flight 455	A Douglas DC-8 suffered two bomb explosions shortly after takeoff from Barbados, causing a fire, de-pressurization, and ultimately the loss of control systems. The airliner crashed, killing all on board. CIA-linked anti-Castro Cuban exiles in Venezuela were convicted.	73
17 August 1978	Philippine Air Lines RP-C1184	Flight from Cebu to Manila was at FL240 over Simara Island when an explosion blew a hole in the rear left lavatory. Damage repaired.	1
7 September 1978	Air Ceylon Avro 748 4R-ACJ	A bomb exploded and started a fire in a Hawker Siddeley HS 748 while parked at Ratmalana Airport. The two pilots and a ground crew member in the aircraft at the time of the explosion escaped. Two persons, who had been passengers in the final flight were convicted of the bombing.	0
19 February 1979	Ethiopian Airlines ET-AFW	Bomb exploded in-flight; location of crash reported to be Barentu, southwest of Asmara.	5
12 December 1981	Aeronica YN-BXW Mexico City Airport bombing	An Aeronica Boeing 727 was undergoing pre-departure checks at Mexico City Airport when a bomb exploded in the passenger cabin, tearing a hole in the fuselage. The bomb was timed to detonate in mid-flight, but because of a 50-minute delay it exploded just before 150 passengers were about to board.	3 crew and 1 ground crew injured
11 August 1982	Pan Am Flight 830	A Boeing 747 en route from Tokyo to Honolulu was damaged by a bomb placed under a seat cushion. The damaged airliner was able to land safely in Honolulu. Mohammed Rashed, linked to the 15 May Organization, was convicted of murder in 1988 and later convicted by a 2006 US court. Abu Ibrahim was also indicted.	1 dead, 16 injured
23 September 1983	Gulf Air Flight 771	On approach to Abu Dhabi, a bomb exploded in the baggage compartment of a Boeing 737 which crashed in the desert, killing all on board. Most of the dead were Pakistani nationals. The bomb was apparently planted by the militant Palestinian Abu Nidal organization to convince Saudi Arabia to pay protection money.	112
18 January 1984	Air France Flight 171	A Boeing 747 flying from Karachi to Dhahran on a Manila-Paris flight suffered an in-flight explosion, blowing 2 meter by 2 meter hole in right right cargo hold no. 4 and releasing cabin pressure. The plane made a 5,000-foot emergency descent and returned to Karachi. The plane was repaired.	0
23 January 1985	Lloyd Aereo Boliviano CP-1276	Flight from La Paz to Santa Cruz was descending at FL100 when a passenger, with dynamite in his briefcase, entered the forward lavatory. He proceeded to detonate the charge, killing himself. Flight safely landed at Santa Cruz, aircraft repaired.	1
23 June 1985	Air India Flight 182 and 1985 Narita International Airport bombing	A Boeing 747 flying from Montreal to London suffered an explosion in the forward cargo hold, causing rapid decompression and the break-up of the aircraft. It was the deadliest aircraft bombing with 329 killed, and the largest mass murder in Canadian history. A second bomb intended for Air India Flight 301 exploded at the Tokyo airport, killing two baggage handlers and injuring four others; this was the first plot to target two planes at the same time. Initial suspect Talwinder Singh Parmar confessed that Lakhbir Singh Rode, leader of the Sikh separatist organization International Sikh Youth Federation (ISYF), was the mastermind.	329 and 2
2 April 1986	TWA Flight 840 (1986)	A Boeing 727 flying from Rome to Athens suffered an explosion in the passenger compartment. Four passengers (including an infant) were blown out a hole in the fuselage. The airliner was able to make an emergency landing. The "Arab Revolutionary Cells" claimed responsibility in retaliation for "American arrogance" and clashes with Libya. The bomb contained one pound of plastic explosive, probably placed under a seat by a Lebanese woman who worked for the Abu Nidal Organisation.	4 dead, 7 injured
17 April 1986	El Al Flight 016	A Semtex bomb and detonator were found by El Al security at Heathrow Airport in the luggage of an oblivious, pregnant, Irish passenger en route to Tel Aviv. Her absent fiancé, Jordanian national Nezar Hindawi, attempted to flee to Syria but was arrested in London and convicted of planting the bomb.	0
3 May 1986	Air Lanka Flight 512	The Lockheed L-1011 Tristar was on the ground, about to take off, when an explosion ripped the plane in two. The bomb was originally supposed to detonate mid-flight, but a delay in boarding resulted in the explosion occurring on the ground.	21
25 December 1986	Iraqi Airways Flight 163	A Boeing 737 flying from Baghdad to Jordan was hijacked by four men. Airline personnel tried to intervene but a hand grenade was detonated in the passenger cabin, forcing an emergency descent. A second grenade exploded in the cockpit and the aircraft crashed and caught fire, killing 63 of 106 people on board. "Islamic Jihad" (a name used for Hezbollah) claimed responsibility. Iraq accused Iran of being behind the attack.	63
29 November 1987	Korean Air Flight 858	A Boeing 707 flying from Abu Dhabi to Bangkok exploded, killing all on board. The bomb used liquid explosives concealed as liquor bottles. It was planted by North Korean agents. One of the agents, Kim Hyon-hui, later confessed to the bombing, after ingesting a cyanide capsule in a suicide attempt. She was sentenced to death but pardoned as it was believed she had been brainwashed.	115
21 December 1988	Pan Am Flight 103	A Boeing 747 flying from Frankfurt to New York via London was destroyed by a bomb, killing all on board and 11 people on the ground when large sections of the aircraft crashed onto residential areas of Lockerbie, Scotland. The bomb was made from PETN and RDX high explosives concealed in a radio cassette player. Libyan intelligence officer Abdelbaset al-Megrahi was convicted in connection with the bombing.	270 (including 11 on the ground)
19 September 1989	UTA Flight 772	A McDonnell Douglas DC-10 flying from Chad to France broke-up and crashed in Niger, killing all aboard. A bomb in the forward cargo hold caused the airliner's destruction. The confession of a Congolese opposition figure resulted in charges against six Libyans, including Deputy Head of Libyan Intelligence Abdullah Senussi, brother-in-law of Muammar al-Gaddafi. Libya refused to extradite the accused, but subsequently recognized its responsibility by compensating the families of the victims. The deemed motive of the bomber was revenge against the French for supporting Chad in the Chadian–Libyan conflict.	170
27 November 1989	Avianca Flight 203	A domestic Colombian flight of a Boeing 727 suffered an explosion at 13,000 feet, five minutes after takeoff from Bogota. A bomb placed near an empty fuel tank exploded, igniting fuel vapors with a blast that ripped the aircraft apart, killing 107 people aboard and another three from falling debris. The bombing was planned by the Medellin Cartel's Pablo Escobar to assassinate presidential candidate César Gaviria Trujillo, but Trujillo was not on the flight.	110 (including 3 on the ground)
11 December 1994	Philippine Airlines Flight 434	A Boeing 747 flying from Cebu, Philippines to Tokyo was seriously damaged by a liquid explosive bomb which killed one passenger. Although vital control systems were damaged, pilots were able to safely land the airliner an hour later. The bomb was assembled and planted for al-Qaeda by Ramzi Yousef, as a test for planned bombings of the Bojinka plot.	1 dead, 10 injured
21–22 January 1995 (planned)	Bojinka plot (failed)	A failed al-Qaeda plot to destroy several airliners over the Pacific Ocean using liquid explosives. The conspirators were discovered before they could carry out the plot.	0
22 December 2001	American Airlines Flight 63	Al-Qaeda operative Richard Reid was subdued by passengers of American Airlines Flight 63, flying from Paris to Miami, after unsuccessfully attempting to detonate plastic explosives concealed in his shoes.	0
7 May 2002	China Northern Airlines Flight 6136	A McDonnell Douglas MD-80 nearing its destination of Dalian, reported fire in the cabin and requested an emergency landing before crashing. The investigation determined that passenger Zhang Pilin used gasoline to set fire to the cabin after purchasing several life insurance policies. Zhang and most passengers died from carbon monoxide inhalation; none survived the crash.	112
24 August 2004	Volga-AviaExpress Flight 1353 and Siberia Airlines Flight 1047	Two domestic passenger flights departing Moscow, a Tupolev Tu-134 and a Tupolev Tu-154, crashed within minutes of each other, with no survivors. The Siberia Airlines flight broadcast a hijack warning shortly before disappearing from radar. An investigation found traces of RDX high explosive at both crashes, and determined Chechen suicide bombers to be responsible. Chechen separatist Shamil Basayev claimed responsibility.	44 and 46
9 August 2006	2006 transatlantic aircraft plot	A failed al-Qaeda terrorist plot to detonate liquid explosives on airliners travelling from the United Kingdom to the United States and Canada.	0
25 December 2009	Northwest Airlines Flight 253	An Airbus A330 flying from Amsterdam to Detroit was the target of a failed al-Qaeda bombing attempt. Umar Farouk Abdulmutallab unsuccessfully attempted to detonate plastic explosives concealed in his underwear.	0
29 October 2010	2010 transatlantic aircraft bomb plot	A failed al-Qaeda plastic-explosive bombing attempt on a UPS and a FedEx cargo plane bound to the United States. The bombs, concealed in packages originating from Yemen, were discovered at stop-overs as a result of shared intelligence. It is believed the bombs were intended to be detonated over a US city.	0
31 October 2015	Metrojet Flight 9268	An Airbus A321 flying from Egypt to Saint Petersburg broke-up above the Sinai, killing everyone on board, becoming the deadliest air disaster in Russian history. ISIL claimed responsibility. Russian investigators found explosive residue and Egyptian authorities agreed it was a terrorist act.	224
2 February 2016	Daallo Airlines Flight 159	An Airbus A321 suffered an explosion shortly after taking off from Mogadishu, opening a hole in the fuselage through which the burnt body of the suicide bomber fell. The airliner was able to safely conduct an emergency landing. Militant group Al-Shabaab claimed responsibility.	1 (the bomber), 2 injured

== See also ==
- Aviation accidents and incidents
- List of terrorist incidents
