= Adnan (name) =

- Pronunciation: Arabic: [ʕadnaːn]
- Gender: Male
- Language: Arabic, Aramaic

Origin
- Meaning: "two gardens of Eden", "immortal", "pioneer"

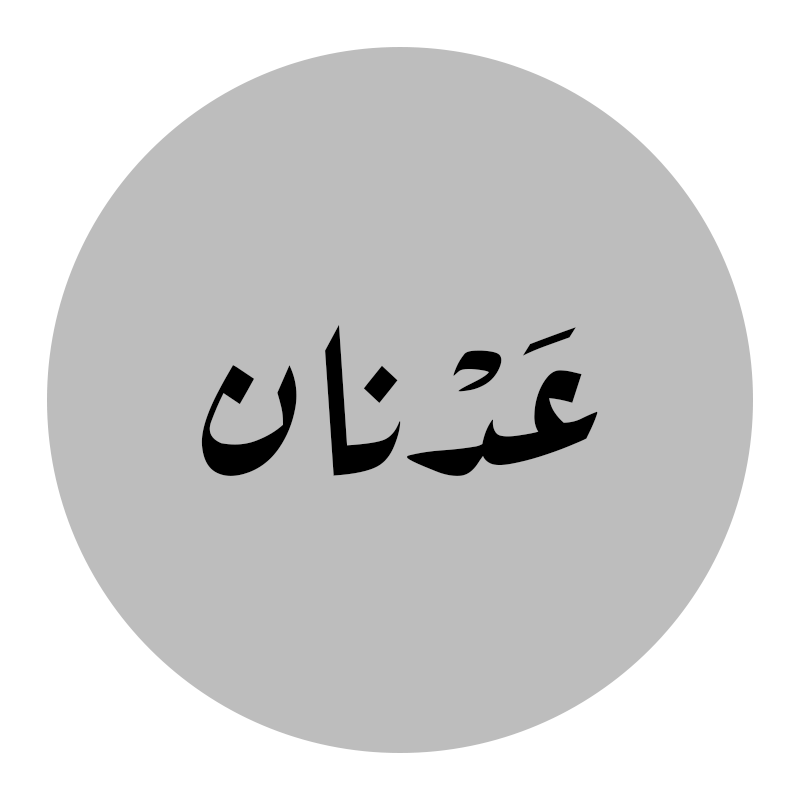
The Arabic name عدنان (Adnan) in Ruqʿah script

Adnan (Arabic: عدنان, romanized: ʿAdnān) is a masculine name common in the Muslim world. Its eponymous bearer was Adnan, an ancient ancestor of various Semitic tribes. The etymological meaning of the name is settler, from a Semitic root `dn; "to stay, abide". The literal meaning of the name is "two gardens of Eden" in Arabic and Aramaic.

== Etymology ==
The Akkadian edinnu is closely related to an Aramaic root word meaning "fruitful" or "well-watered," underscoring the concept of Eden as a place of fertility and divine abundance. The Akkadian word edinnu (𒂔𒄘𒃻, meaning "plain" or "steppe") and the Sumerian word edin (𒂔𒁴, meaning "plain, open country") are believed to be the etymological roots of the Hebrew word "Eden."

The name "Eden" is the name of the garden where God placed Adam and Eve in the Book of Genesis. In the context of the Bible, the concept of "two gardens of Eden" can be understood through the lens of the Garden of Eden as a physical place and the concept of a "higher Gan Eden" as a celestial, spiritual realm, rather than two distinct physical gardens. The Hebrew word for Eden, עֵדֶן (ʿĒḏen), translates to "delight" or "paradise," signifying a place of divine pleasure and abundance.

== A–F ==
- Adnan Adıvar (1882–1955), Turkish politician
- Adnan Aganović (born 1987), Croatian footballer
- Adnan Ahmed (born 1984), British footballer
- Adnan Alisic (born 1984), Dutch footballer
- Adnan Al-Kaissie (1939–2023), Iraqi-American professional wrestler
- Adnan Al-Shargi (1941–2021), Lebanese football manager
- Adnan al-Dulaimi (1932–2017), Iraqi politician
- Adnan al-Husayni (born 1946), Palestinian politician
- Adnan al-Janabi, Iraqi politician
- Adnan al-Malki (1918–1955) Syrian Army officer
- Adnan al-Zurufi (born 1966), Iraqi politician
- Adnan Ali Daif, Bahrainian retired footballer
- Adnan Awad (born 1942), Palestinian captain
- Adnan Babajić (born 1988), Bosnian singer and television personality
- Adnan Badran (born 1935), Jordanian scientist, academic, politician and prime minister
- Adnan Badr Hassan, Syrian security officer
- Adnan Barakat (born 1982), Moroccan footballer
- Adnan Bešić (born 1985), Austrian-Bosnian footballer
- Adnan bin Saidi (1915–1942), Malayan soldier
- Adnan Buntar, Bruneian diplomat
- Adnan Čustović (born 1978), Bosnian football coach and former professional footballer
- Adnan Coker (1927–2022), Turkish abstract artist
- Adnan Dirjal (born 1960), Iraqi retired footballer and national team coach
- Adnan Erkan (born 1968), Turkish footballer
- Adnan Sadık Erzi (1923–1990), Turkish historian
- Adnan Gušo (born 1975), Bosnian retired footballer and team coach
- Adnan Güngör (born 1980), Turkish footballer

== G–M ==
- Adnan Haidar (born 1989), Lebanese footballer
- Adnan Hajrulahović (born 1979), Bosnian fashion designer
- Adnan Hamidović (born 1982), Bosnian rapper better known by his stage name Frenkie
- Adnan Harmandić (born 1983), Bosnian handball player
- Adnan Hasković (born 1984), Bosnian film, television, and stage actor
- Adnan Hodžić (born 1989), Bosnian-American former basketball player
- Adnan Hrelja (born 1984), Bosnian chess grandmaster
- Adnan Hussein (born 1954), Lebanese academic and politician
- Adnan Januzaj (born 1995), Belgian professional footballer of Albanian descent
- Adnan Kahveci (1949–1993), Turkish politician
- Adnan Karim (born 1963), Kurdish singer
- Adnan Kassar (1930–2025), Lebanese banker, businessman and politician
- Adnan Khairallah (1940–1989), Iraqi military officer and friend of Saddam Hussein
- Adnan Khan (born 1988), Indian actor
- Adnan Khashoggi (1935–2017), billionaire Saudi Arabian businessman
- Adnan Kovačević (born 1993), Bosnian footballer
- Adnan Maral (born 1968), Turkish-German actor
- Adnan Mansour (born 1946), Lebanese politician
- Adnan Melhem (born 1989), Lebanese footballer
- Adnan Menderes (1899–1961), Turkish prime minister (1950–1960)
- Adnan Mohammad (born 1996), Danish footballer
- Adnan Mravac (born 1981), Bosnian footballer
- Adnan Mravac (born 1982), Bosnian retired footballer who played in Austria

== N–Z ==
- Adnan Nawaz, British news and sports broadcaster
- Adnan Oktar (born 1956), Turkish creationist, cult leader, and television personality
- Adnan Omran (born 1934), Syrian politician
- Adnan Özyalçıner (born 1934), Turkish author
- Adnan Pachachi (1923–2019), Iraqi politician
- Adnan Polat (born 1953), Turkish businessman
- Adnan Şenses (1935–2013), Turkish actor, singer and songwriter
- Adnan Süvari (1926–1991), Turkish football coach
- Adnan Terzić (born 1960), former chairman of the Council of Ministers of Bosnia and Herzegovina
- Adnan Yaakob (born 1950), Malaysian politician and the current Menteri Besar of Pahang
- Adnan Yıldız (born 1966), Turkish footballer
- Adnan Zahirović (born 1990), Bosnian footballer
