= James A. Walsh (Medal of Honor) =

United States Navy Medal of Honor recipient (1897–1960)

- Born: July 24, 1897; New York City
- Died: May 29, 1960 (aged 62); Montrose, New York, U.S.
- Burial place: Long Island National Cemetery, Farmingdale, New York
- Military career
- Allegiance: United States
- Branch: United States Navy
- Rank: Lieutenant
- Unit: USS Florida (BB-30)
- Conflicts: United States occupation of Veracruz; World War I World War II
- Awards: Medal of Honor

James Aloysius Walsh (July 24, 1897 – May 29, 1960) was a United States Navy sailor and a recipient of the U.S. military's highest decoration, the Medal of Honor, for his role in the occupation of Veracruz. Only 16 at the time of his actions, he was possibly the youngest recipient of the Medal in the 20th century.

A native of New York City, Walsh joined the Navy from there and by April 21, 1914, was serving as a seaman on the USS Florida (BB-30). On that day and the next, he participated in the capture of the Mexican port city of Veracruz. Walsh went ashore as a member of a five-man signal squad led by Ensign Edward O. McDonnell. The other squad members were Charles F. Bishop, Charles L. Nordsiek and Fred J. Schnepel. Despite being under constant enemy fire, the squad continued to relay signals to and from USS Prairie offshore from an exposed rooftop position. For his "extraordinary heroism" during the battle, Walsh was awarded the Medal of Honor two months later, on June 15.

Walsh left the Navy, but re-enlisted in 1917 to serve aboard a destroyer during World War I. After the war, he left active duty again to work as an insurance broker. Returning to active duty during World War II, Walsh received the commissioned officer rank of lieutenant in 1942 and served as an amphibious warfare instructor.

In later life, Walsh was a resident of Manhattan and worked for the Veterans Administration. He died at the Franklin D. Roosevelt Veterans Hospital in Montrose, New York at age 62. Walsh was buried at Long Island National Cemetery in Farmingdale, New York.

== Medal of Honor citation ==
- Rank and organization: Seaman, U.S. Navy.
- Born: 24 July 1897 New York, N.Y.
- Entered service at: New York, N.Y.
- G.O. No.: 101, 15 June 1914.

Citation:

On board the U.S.S. Florida; for extraordinary heroism in the line of his profession during the seizure of Vera Cruz Mexico, 21 and 22 April 1914.

== See also ==
- List of Medal of Honor recipients (Veracruz)
