= Charles Luers Nordsiek =

US Navy sailor and Medal of Honor recipient (1896–1937)

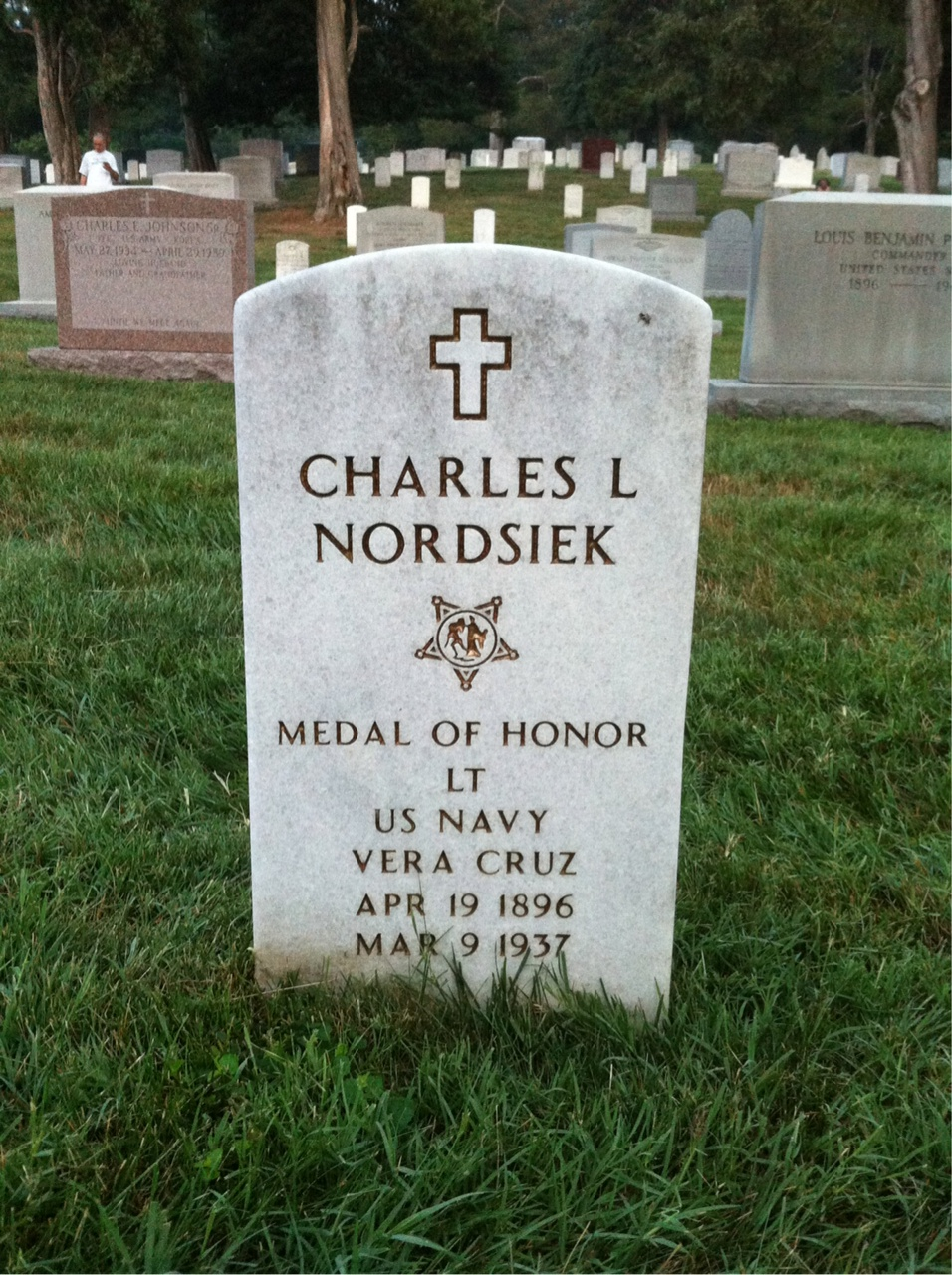
- Grave at Arlington National Cemetery
- Born: April 19, 1896; New York City, US
- Died: March 9, 1937 (aged 40); Bluefield, West Virginia, US
- Burial place: Arlington National Cemetery, Arlington, Virginia
- Military career
- Allegiance: United States
- Branch: United States Navy
- Service years: 1913–1921
- Rank: Lieutenant
- Unit: USS Florida
- Conflicts: United States occupation of Veracruz; World War I
- Awards: Medal of Honor
- Other work: merchant ship captain

Charles Luers Nordsiek (April 19, 1896 – March 9, 1937) was a seaman in the United States Navy and a Medal of Honor recipient for his role in the United States occupation of Veracruz.

Born in New York City, Nordsiek attended high school there until 1911. He enlisted in the U.S. Navy on September 4, 1913.

In 1914, Nordsiek was assigned to the battleship USS Florida. He went ashore at Veracruz as a member of a five-man signal squad led by Ensign Edward O. McDonnell. The other squad members were Charles F. Bishop, Fred J. Schnepel and James A. Walsh. Despite being under constant enemy fire the afternoon of April 21 and morning of April 22, the squad continued to relay signals to and from USS Prairie offshore from an exposed rooftop position. At one point in the engagement, Nordsiek was wounded.

Nordsiek received the Medal of Honor at the age of 18, making him one of the youngest recipients in its history. He later advanced from seaman to quartermaster in the Navy.

Shortly after the United States entered World War I, he was commissioned as an ensign in the Naval Auxiliary Reserve on May 29, 1917. He was subsequently assigned to serve on supply and transport ships operating in trans-Atlantic convoys.

Nordsiek was subsequently promoted to lieutenant and left the Navy on September 30, 1921. Granted a license to command ocean-going merchant steamers, he found work as a merchant ship captain.

Nordsiek died on March 9, 1937, in Bluefield, West Virginia, and is buried next to his wife Mary (1898–1966) at Arlington National Cemetery, Arlington, Virginia.

== Medal of Honor citation ==
Rank and organization: Ordinary Seaman, U.S. Navy
Born: 19 April 1896, New York, N.Y.
Accredited to: New York
G.O. No.: 101, 15 June 1914.

Citation:

On board the U.S.S. Florida, Nordsiek showed extraordinary heroism in the line of his profession during the seizure of Vera Cruz, Mexico, 21 and 22 April 1914.

== See also ==
- List of Medal of Honor recipients (Veracruz)
