= Robert Spears =

Robert or Bob Spears may refer to:

- Robert Spears (minister) (1825–1899), British Unitarian minister
- Robert Spears (cyclist) (1893–1950), Australian cyclist
- Robert Spears (naturopath) (1894–1969), naturopath and prime suspect in the bombing of National Airlines Flight 967
- Robert R. Spears Jr. (1908–2008), American Christian clergyman
- Robert Spears-Jennings (born 2004), American football player

== See also ==
- Robert Spear (disambiguation)
