= Fred Jurgen Schnepel =

US Navy seaman and Medal of Honor recipient (1892–1948)

- Born: February 24, 1892; New York City, US
- Died: February 7, 1948 (aged 55); Port Chester, New York, US
- Burial place: Arlington National Cemetery, Arlington, Virginia
- Military career
- Allegiance: United States of America
- Branch: United States Navy
- Rank: Chief Quartermaster
- Unit: USS Florida
- Conflicts: United States occupation of Veracruz; World War I
- Awards: Medal of Honor

Fred Jurgen Schnepel (February 24, 1892 – February 7, 1948) was a Seaman in the United States Navy and a Medal of Honor recipient for his role in the United States occupation of Veracruz.

In 1914, Schnepel was assigned to the battleship USS Florida. He went ashore at Veracruz as a member of a five-man signal squad led by Ensign Edward O. McDonnell. The other squad members were Charles F. Bishop, Charles L. Nordsiek and James A. Walsh. Despite being under constant enemy fire the afternoon of April 21 and morning of April 22, the squad continued to relay signals to and from USS Prairie offshore from an exposed rooftop position.

Schnepel served in the Navy until 1923, rising to the rank of Chief Quartermaster (CQM). In 1942, he was working as a builder and living in East Port Chester, Connecticut. Schnepel died on February 7, 1948 in Port Chester, New York, and is buried in Arlington National Cemetery, Arlington, Virginia.

== Medal of Honor citation ==
Rank and organization: Ordinary Seaman, U.S. Navy
Born: 24 February 1892, New York, N.Y.
Accredited to: New York
G.O. No.: 101, 15 June 1914.

Citation:

On board the U.S.S. Florida, Schnepel showed extraordinary heroism in the line of his profession during the seizure of Vera Cruz, Mexico, 21 and 22 April 1914.

== See also ==
- List of Medal of Honor recipients (Veracruz)
