= Charles Francis Bishop =

United States Navy Medal of Honor recipient (1888–1954)

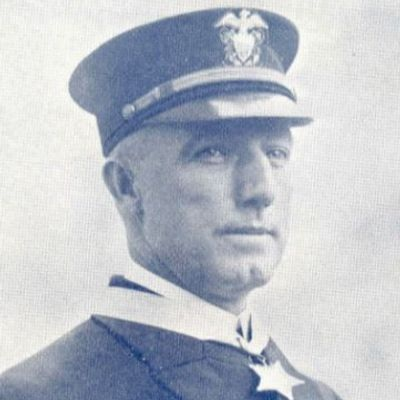
- Born: August 2, 1888; Pittsburgh, Pennsylvania, US
- Died: February 1, 1954 (aged 65); San Diego, California, US
- Burial place: Fort Rosecrans National Cemetery, San Diego, California
- Military career
- Allegiance: United States of America
- Branch: United States Navy
- Rank: Chief Quartermaster
- Unit: USS Florida
- Conflicts: U.S. Occupation of Veracruz; World War I
- Awards: Medal of Honor

Charles Francis Bishop (August 2, 1888 – February 1, 1954) was a United States Navy sailor who received the Medal of Honor for actions while assigned to USS Florida during the Veracruz Campaign.

== Biography ==
Charles F. Bishop was born in Pittsburgh, Pennsylvania. He joined the U.S. Navy and by the time of the Vera Cruz expedition in 1914 was a Quartermaster Second Class assigned to the battleship USS Florida. Bishop went ashore as a member of a five-man signal squad led by Ensign Edward O. McDonnell. The other squad members were Charles L. Nordsiek, Fred J. Schnepel and James A. Walsh. Despite being under constant enemy fire the afternoon of April 21 and morning of April 22, the squad continued to relay signals to and from USS Prairie offshore from an exposed rooftop position. Bishop was awarded the Medal of Honor in June 1914 and received it in January 1915.

Bishop remained in the Navy and rose to the rank of chief quartermaster. He is buried in the Fort Rosecrans National Cemetery in San Diego, California.

== Medal of Honor citation ==
Rank and organization: Quartermaster Second Class, U.S. Navy
Born: August 2, 1888, Pittsburgh, Pa.
Accredited to: Pennsylvania
G.O. No.: 101, June 15, 1914

Citation:

On board the U.S.S. Florida for extraordinary heroism in the line of his profession during the seizure of Vera Cruz, Mexico, April 21, 1914.

== See also ==
- List of Medal of Honor recipients (Veracruz)
