= TWA Flight 840 =

TWA Flight 840 was a regularly scheduled Trans World Airlines flight.

The flight was twice attacked by Palestinian terrorists:

- TWA Flight 840 (1969), a hijacking
- TWA Flight 840 (1986), a bombing
