= Flight 206 =

Flight 206 may refer to:

- China Airlines Flight 206, crashed on 12 August 1970
- Garuda Indonesia Flight 206, hijacked on 28 March 1981
- Philippine Airlines Flight 206, crashed on 26 June 1987
- Comair Flight 206, broke up on 1 March 1988
