= Flight 840 =

Flight 840 may refer to

- TWA Flight 840 hijacking, a hijacking in 1969
- TWA Flight 840 bombing, a bombing in 1986
