= Fatah Special Operations Group =

Palestinian militant faction

The Fatah Special Operations Group (Fatah-SOG), Martyrs of Tel al-Za'tar, Amn Araissi or Hawari Group was a Palestinian militant faction associated with Fatah, the main group of the Palestine Liberation Organization (PLO).

The group was led by Fatah colonel Abdullah Abd al-Hamid Labib, known as Colonel Hawari. Its members were drawn from Fatah and more radical Palestinian groups, such as members of the 15 May Organization after it disbanded in the mid-1980s.

Fatah-SOG carried out bombings and other attacks against international targets, especially Israeli and Syrian (in 1976 and 1984–90, Syria and allied Lebanese militias attacked the PLO and Palestinian refugee communities in Lebanon); but it is also believed to have attacked European and American interests. It is suspected of bombing TWA Flight 840 in 1986. The exact relations between Fatah-SOG and the PLO leadership of Yasser Arafat remain unclear.
