= National Airlines Flight 2511 =

1960 airplane crash in North Carolina

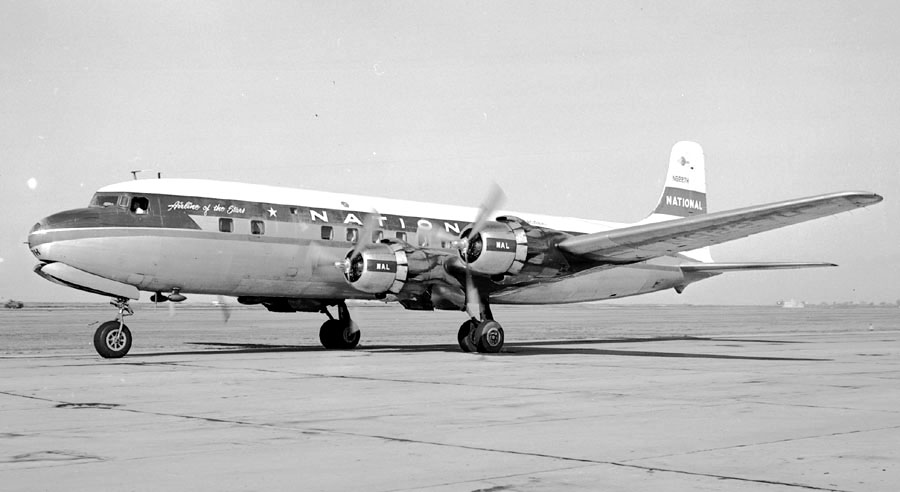
- A National Airlines DC-6B (sister ship to accident aircraft)

Bombing
- Date: January 6, 1960
- Summary: Suspected suicide bombing
- Site: Brunswick County, near Bolivia, North Carolina, United States; 34.0798°N 78.1805°W

Aircraft
- Aircraft type: Douglas DC-6B
- Operator: National Airlines
- Registration: N8225H
- Flight origin: Idlewild Airport, New York City
- Destination: Miami, Florida, United States
- Occupants: 34
- Passengers: 29
- Crew: 5
- Fatalities: 34
- Survivors: 0

National Airlines Flight 2511 was a United States domestic passenger flight from New York City to Miami, Florida. On January 6, 1960, the Douglas DC-6 serving the flight exploded in midair. The National Airlines aircraft was carrying 5 crew members and 29 passengers, all of whom perished. The Civil Aeronautics Board investigation concluded that the plane was brought down by a bomb made of dynamite. No criminal charges were ever filed, nor was the blame for the bombing ever determined, though a suicide bombing is suspected. The investigation remains open.

One of the victims was retired U.S. Navy Vice Admiral Edward Orrick McDonnell, a Medal of Honor recipient and veteran of both World Wars.

== Flight history ==
National Airlines' New York-Miami route was usually flown by a Boeing 707 as Flight 601. On January 5, 1960, the 707 aircraft scheduled to fly to Miami was grounded due to cracks that were discovered in the cockpit windshield. The windshield replacement procedure would take eight hours to perform, so National Airlines transferred the passengers of Flight 601 to two propliner aircraft it had in reserve.

Passengers were boarded on these two replacement planes on a first-come, first-served basis. Seventy-six passengers boarded a Lockheed L-188 Electra. This aircraft flew to Miami and arrived safely.

The remaining 29 passengers boarded a Douglas DC-6B, which departed Idlewild Airport for Miami as Flight 2511. The crew consisted of stewardesses Mary O'Dell (24) and Valery Stewart (25), pilot Dale Southard (45), copilot Richard L. Hentzel (31), and flight engineer Robert R. Halleckson (34). The plane departed New York at 11:52 p.m. and was scheduled to arrive in Miami at 4:36 a.m. on January 6.

The aircraft, registration N8225H, was described as being in good condition. It had four Pratt and Whitney R-2800 CB-16 engines and had accumulated 24,836 hours of flight time.

2511's flight plan called for it to fly south from New York to Wilmington, North Carolina, where it would continue south over the Atlantic Ocean. It would fly south 550 miles (890 km) over the ocean to Palm Beach, Florida. The crew maintained radio contact with National Airlines' radio controllers and air traffic control, reporting clouds and instrument flying conditions. The crew checked in with Wilmington Airport at 2:07 a.m., and later reported flying over the Carolina Beach radio beacon at 2:31 a.m. This was the last radio contact with the airplane.

== Crash and recovery ==
After losing contact with the DC-6 aircraft, National Airlines, the United States Coast Guard, and the United States Navy began an intensive search along the southeastern coast of the United States. The search was called off the following day, when National Airlines received word that there was a plane down in North Carolina.

At about 2:45 a.m. a farmer, Richard Randolph, heard the sound of an engine cutting in and out, followed by tearing metal and an explosion. Later that morning, after his teenage son McArthur Randolph found airplane wreckage in one of his father's fields, Richard Randolph drove to Bolivia, North Carolina, which had the nearest phone. He called Wilmington Airport to report the downed plane at approximately 7:00 a.m. When Highway Patrol officers responded, he led them to the crash site.

Bodies and wreckage were scattered over an area of 20 acres (8 ha) covering farm fields, marshland, and pine forests.

During the first day of search and rescue, investigators located 32 bodies of the 34 persons on board. One of the missing bodies was later found at the main crash site. The remaining body was found at Snow's Marsh, approximately 16 miles (26 km) from the main site.

Initial reports speculated that the aircraft had disintegrated in mid-flight. One newspaper reporter indicated that the largest piece of wreckage he observed was a portion of the wing. A fragment of aluminum, believed to be a piece of the airplane's skin, was found on Kure Beach, 25 miles (40 km) from the rest of the wreckage.

== Investigations ==
Approximate flight path of Flight 2511, with the crash site, Kure Beach, and Snow's Marsh marked. Source: Civil Aeronautics Board report.

The Civil Aeronautics Board (CAB), part of the Department of Transportation, were the primary investigators into the crash of Flight 2511. The wreckage of the DC-6 was taken to a hangar at nearby Wilmington Airport, where the fuselage was reassembled on a wood-and-chicken-wire frame. Investigators recovered approximately 90% of the fuselage, which was then assembled on the frame in the Wilmington hangar.

Investigators identified the point of origin of the disintegration as an area immediately ahead of the leading edge of the aircraft's right wing. The material recovered from Kure Beach, including a portion of the wing fillet, was from this general area. Investigators did not recover material from an irregular, triangularly shaped area positioned above the leading edge and extending forward ahead of the wing.

The bodies were taken to the local high school gymnasium to await autopsy and identification by a Federal Bureau of Investigation (FBI) fingerprinting team. The Brunswick County coroner ordered autopsies of the passengers and crew to determine the specific cause of death for each. One of the victims was Vice Admiral Edward Orrick McDonnell, U.S. Navy (retired), a recipient of the Medal of Honor and a veteran of both World Wars. Other victims included a vice president of the Continental Bank of Cuba, a pharmacist, a student at the University of Miami, and an insurance adjuster. Three of the victims had been standby passengers and only made the flight due to others cancelling their reservations.

=== Julian Frank ===
The only body not found at the main crash site was that of Julian Frank, a New York City lawyer. His body was recovered from Snow's Marsh, located on the west side of the Cape Fear River. Frank's body had sustained significant injuries, including the amputation of both legs, and debris was embedded in his body. Frank's injuries were significantly different from and much more extensive than the other passengers'. Furthermore, Frank's injuries were inconsistent with the type of injury usually incurred in an aircraft accident.

Frank was autopsied twice, the second time to recover debris embedded in his body. The autopsy revealed that his lower extremities had been ripped off; his muscle tissue was extensively mutilated and torn; small pieces of wire, brass, and miscellaneous articles including a hat ornament were embedded in various limbs; the fingers of his right hand were fractured and the bones splintered; and the distal phalanx of each finger on his left hand was missing. The coroner also observed numerous patches of blackened areas, similar to close-range gunshot residue. Four human finger bones were discovered among the wreckage at the primary crash site.

At the time of the crash, Frank had been accused of running a charity scam and was under investigation by the Manhattan district attorney's office. It was alleged that he had misappropriated up to a million dollars (roughly equivalent to $8 million in 2024 dollars) in a series of scams.

=== Bombing ===
The crash of National Airlines Flight 2511 came shortly after the crash of another National Airlines plane. National Airlines Flight 967 exploded over the Gulf of Mexico on November 16, 1959. The cause of the explosion was believed to be a bomb in the luggage of one of the passengers, Robert Vernon Spears, who enlisted a substitute to board the plane in his place. Spears was heavily insured, and the FBI indicated that his motive was insurance fraud. Similarly, Julian Frank was covered by almost $900,000 (roughly equivalent to $7.3 million in 2024 dollars) in life insurance policies, including some purchased the day of the crash.

The CAB sent the material recovered from Frank's body to the FBI laboratories for testing and analysis. Analysis determined that the many wire fragments that were found embedded in Frank's body, in the seats on the right-hand side, and in the carpeting, were low-carbon steel wire, 0.025 inches (0.64 mm) in diameter. One of the dismembered fingers recovered from the wreckage had been embedded in the face plate of a travel alarm clock. A life jacket from Kure Beach, found with parts of a flight bag embedded in it, tested positive for nitrate residue. A black "crusty" residue on Frank's right hand was found to be manganese dioxide, a substance found in dry cell batteries.

In addition to the evidence collected from Frank's body, there were also samples of residue taken from the air vents and hat rack located on the right side of the aircraft near the leading edge of the wing. These samples contained sodium carbonate, sodium nitrate, and mixtures of sodium-sulfur compounds.

The Civil Aeronautics Board concluded the severity of Frank's injuries and the numerous particulates found embedded in his body could only be attributed to his proximity to an explosion. Furthermore, the chemical compounds detected in the area around the explosion's point of origin were consistent with those generated by a dynamite explosion. The manganese dioxide samples collected from the seats near the focal point and from Frank's body indicated a dry cell battery was located very near the explosive. The CAB determined, based on the blast pattern, a dynamite charge had been placed underneath the window seat of row 7.

The CAB's chief investigator, Oscar Bakke, testified before the Senate Aviation subcommittee to this effect on January 12, 1960. The same day, the FBI formally took over the criminal aspects of the investigation.

=== Other theories ===
One of the first theories considered by investigators was that Flight 2511 was involved in a collision with another airliner, given the crash site's proximity to Wilmington Airport. Investigators reviewed the flight plan and other documents to determine if other aircraft were in the area. There was no record of any other aircraft, or of any military missiles having been fired. Furthermore, wreckage of Flight 2511 was confined to two general locations, namely the primary crash scene near Bolivia and the secondary scene in Kure Beach. All debris was accounted for as belonging to the DC-6.

Another theory presented by an expert shortly after the crash theorized that an engine fire could have been the catalyst of the accident. Under this theory, one of the two engines on the right wing may have caught fire. Shrapnel from the engine may have punctured the fuselage, causing explosive decompression.

Alternatively, Julian Frank, who was known to be desperately afraid of flying, may have panicked and hit the window, weakening it in such a manner it subsequently blew out. Under this theory, the pilots and passengers would have been aware of an emergency aboard, which would have allowed them to begin making preparations for an emergency landing. This theory was supported by the wide right turn the aircraft appeared to make prior to disintegrating and crashing, as well as the fact some of the passengers were found wearing life jackets.

Though the bombing and engine fire theories were the most commonly held, other theories were advanced during the investigation as well. Several days after the explosion, National Airlines pilots who were members of the Airline Pilots Association sent a telegram to the Federal Aviation Administration (FAA). In the telegram, they made a claim that the routine proficiency flights performed by pilots caused unnecessary stress on the aircraft. These test flights, which pilots underwent every six months, required the pilots to put their aircraft through "violent maneuvers" which could damage the aircraft.

In their final report, the Civil Aeronautics Board indicated it had investigated a variety of alternative theories, including:

- metal fatigue failure of the cabin leading to explosive decompression
- a propeller blade failing, striking, and rupturing the cabin
- a malfunction in the cabin pressurization system leading to structural failure
- a foreign object striking the plane and penetrating the cabin
- lightning strike
- fuel vapor explosion
- oxygen bottle explosion

The CAB ruled out each of these theories during the course of their investigation.

=== Conclusions ===
The Civil Aeronautics Board concluded Flight 2511 was brought down by a dynamite explosion in the passenger cabin. The explosive charge was located "beneath the extreme right seat of seat row No. 7." The report also pointed out that Julian Frank was close to the explosion, though it assigned no blame to him.

The explosion occurred at approximately 2:33 a.m., significantly damaging the structural integrity of the aircraft and forcing it into a wide right-hand turn. As it descended, it suffered an in-flight disintegration and crashed at 2:38 a.m.

The CAB concluded in their final report:

No reference is made in this report concerning the placing of the dynamite aboard the aircraft or of the person or persons responsible for its detonation. The malicious destruction of an aircraft is a Federal crime. After the Board's determination that such was involved, the criminal aspects of this accident were referred to the Department of Justice through its Federal Bureau of Investigation ...

The Board determines that the probable cause of this accident was the detonation of dynamite within the passenger cabin. — Civil Aeronautics Board File No. 1-0002, pp. 1,12

The FBI assumed control of the criminal investigation on January 20, 1960. The case remains open and unsolved.

== See also ==
- Comair Flight 206
- Continental Airlines Flight 11
- List of accidents and incidents involving airliners in the United States
- List of unsolved deaths
- National Airlines Flight 967
