= Continental Airlines Flight 11 =

1962 airliner bombing

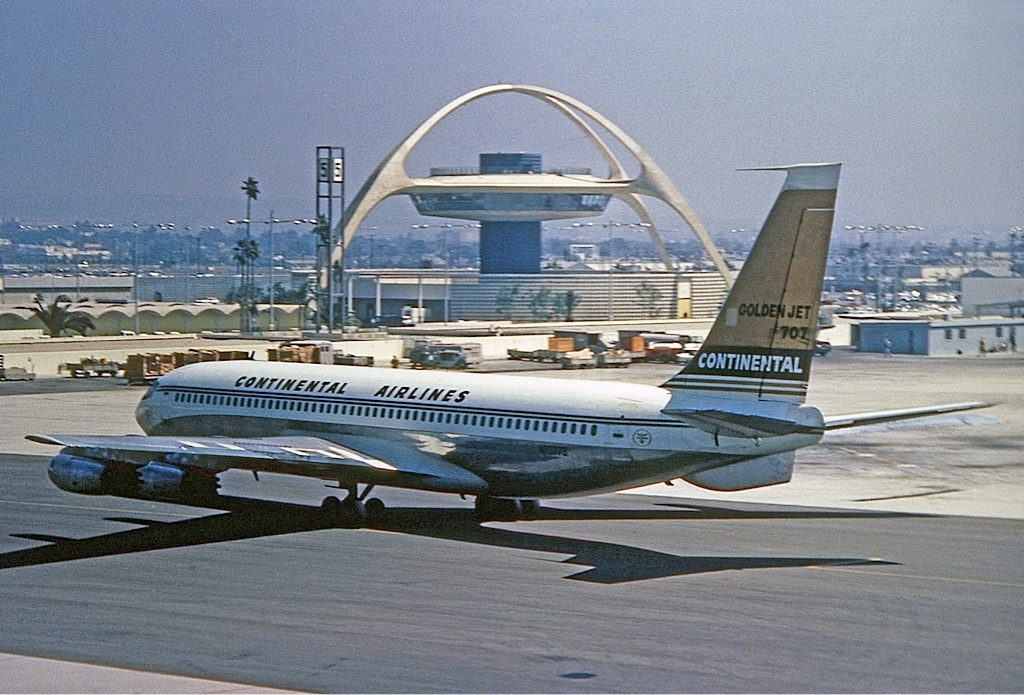
- A Continental Airlines Boeing 707 similar to the aircraft involved in the crash, this was later involved in an incident at Kansas City Municipal Airport as Continental Airlines Flight 12

Bombing
- Date: May 22, 1962
- Summary: Suicide bombing committed as an insurance fraud by a passenger
- Site: Union Township, Putnam County near Unionville, Missouri, United States; 40°32′49.43″N 93°3′28.25″W

Aircraft
- Aircraft type: Boeing 707-124
- Operator: Continental Airlines
- IATA flight No.: CO11
- ICAO flight No.: COA11
- Call sign: CONTINENTAL 11
- Registration: N70775
- Flight origin: O'Hare International Airport, Chicago, Illinois, United States
- Destination: Charles B. Wheeler Downtown Airport, Kansas City, Missouri, United States
- Occupants: 45
- Passengers: 37
- Crew: 8
- Fatalities: 45
- Injuries: 0
- Survivors: 0

Continental Airlines Flight 11, registration N70775, was a Boeing 707 aircraft which exploded in the vicinity of Centerville, Iowa, United States, while en route from O'Hare Airport, Chicago, Illinois, to Kansas City, Missouri, on May 22, 1962. The aircraft crashed in a clover field near Unionville, in Putnam County, Missouri, killing all 45 crew and passengers on board. The investigation determined the cause of the crash was a suicide bombing, committed as insurance fraud.

== Background ==
=== Aircraft ===
The aircraft involved was a Boeing 707-124, registration N70775. It was manufactured on June 16, 1959, and had accumulated a total of 11,945 flight hours. The aircraft was powered by four Pratt & Whitney JT3C-6 engines.

=== Crew ===
The crew consisted of Captain Fred R. Gray (age 50), First Officer Edward J. Sullivan (41), Flight Engineer Roger D. "Jack" Allen (32), one Purser (Director of Passenger Services) and four stewardesses. Captain Gray was a highly experienced pilot, having accumulated 25,000 flight hours, of which 2,600 were in the 707. First Officer Sullivan had accumulated 14,500 flight hours, of which 600 were in the 707.

== Crash ==
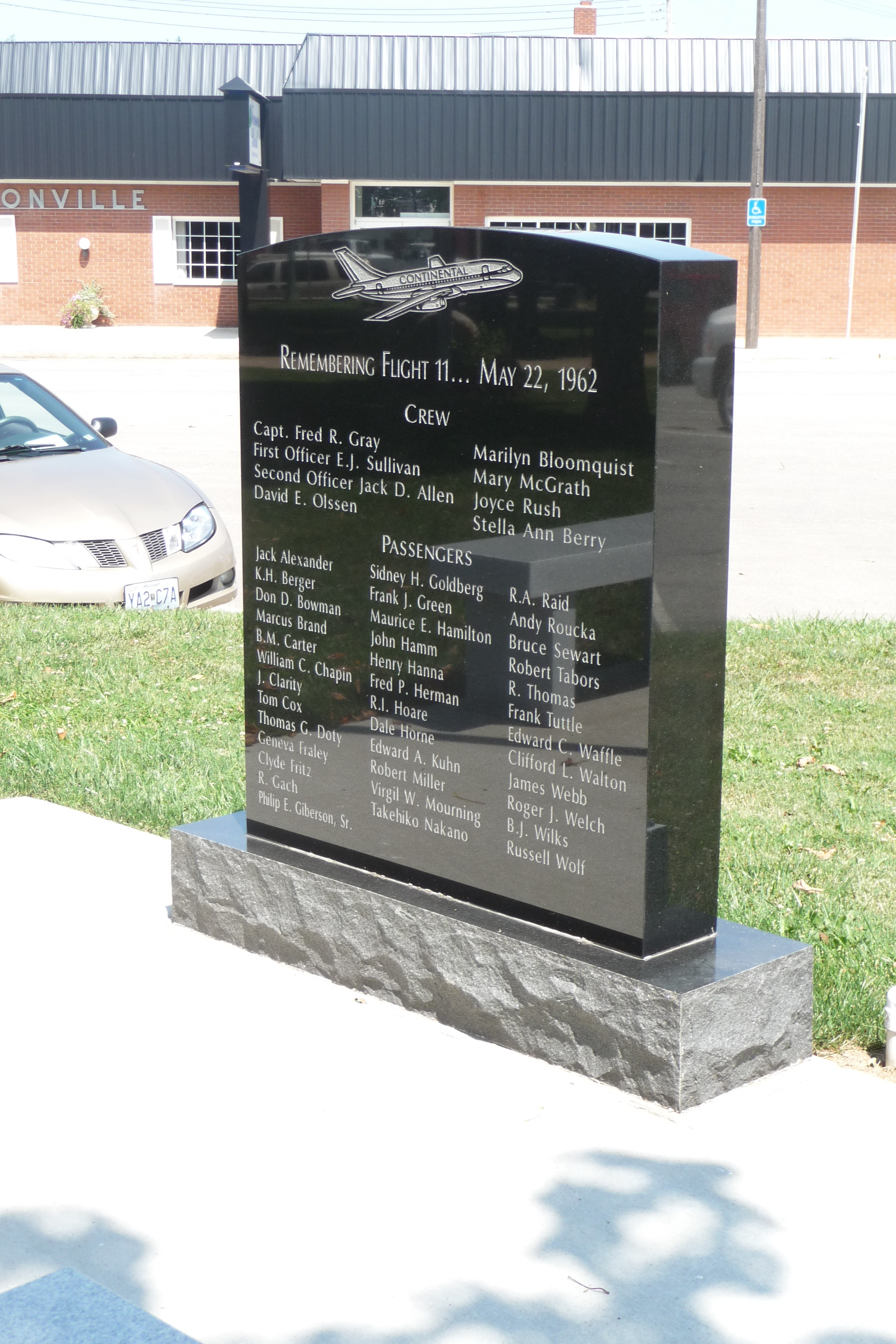
Continental Airlines Flight 11 memorial erected in Unionville, Missouri

The perpetrator, Thomas G. Doty, arrived at the gate just moments before departure.

Flight 11 departed O'Hare at 8:35 p.m. The flight was routine until just before the Mississippi River when it deviated from its filed flight plan to the north to avoid a line of thunderstorms. In the vicinity of Centerville, Iowa, the radar image of the aircraft disappeared from the scope of the Waverly, Iowa, Flight Following Service. At approximately 9:17 p.m. an explosion occurred in the right rear lavatory, resulting in the separation of the tail section from the fuselage. The flight crew initiated the required emergency descent procedures and donned their smoke masks due to the dense fog that formed in the cabin immediately after decompression. Following the separation of the tail, the remaining aircraft structure pitched nose down violently, causing the engines to tear off, after which it fell in uncontrolled gyrations. The fuselage of the Boeing 707, minus the aft 38 feet (12 m), and with part of the left and most of the right wing intact, struck the ground, headed westerly down a 10-degree slope of an alfalfa field.

Witnesses in and around both Cincinnati, Iowa and Unionville reported hearing loud and unusual noises at around 9:20 p.m. Two more saw a big flash or ball of fire in the sky. A B-47 Stratojet bomber flying out of Forbes Air Force Base in Topeka, Kansas was flying at the altitude of 26,500 ft (8,100 m) in the vicinity of Kirksville, Missouri. The aircraft commander saw a bright flash in the sky forward and above his aircraft's position. After referring to his navigation logs, he estimated the flash to have occurred at 9:22 p.m. near the location where the last radar target of Flight 11 had been seen. Most of the fuselage was found near Unionville, but the engines and parts of the tail section, and left wing were found up to six miles (9.7 km) away from the main wreckage.

Of the 45 individuals on board, 44 were dead when rescuers reached the crash site. One passenger, a 27-year-old man, died of internal injuries at Saint Joseph Mercy Hospital in Centerville, Iowa, an hour and a half after being rescued.

== Investigation ==
FBI agents discovered that Doty, a married man with a five-year-old daughter, had purchased a life insurance policy from Mutual of Omaha for $150,000 (roughly equivalent to $1.19 million in 2022), the maximum available; his death would also bring in another $150,000 in additional insurance (some purchased at the airport) and death benefits. Doty was about to appear in court on an armed robbery charge. Doty had purchased six sticks of dynamite shortly before the flight, took them into the lavatory in his briefcase, and ignited them. His motive was that his wife and daughter would collect on the $300,000 of life insurance. His widow attempted to collect on the insurance, but the policy was voided when Doty's death was ruled a suicide.

In July 2010, a memorial was erected near the crash site in Unionville, Missouri on the anniversary of the crash.

In May 2012, a special 50th-anniversary memorial service was held in Unionville.

== In popular culture ==
- Flight 11 is dramatized in Aircrash Confidential.
- The event partially inspired Arthur Hailey's novel Airport.

== See also ==
- 1962 in aviation
- Aviation safety
- National Airlines Flight 967, U.S. on November 16, 1959, killing 42 (Suspected bombing for insurance fraud)
- National Airlines Flight 2511, US – 1960 in-flight suicide bombing for insurance fraud
- Canadian Pacific Air Lines Flight 108, Canada – 1949 in-flight bombing for murder and insurance fraud
- China Northern Airlines Flight 6136, China – 2002 in-flight arson caused by insurance fraud
- Federal Express Flight 705, US – 1994 attempted in-flight hijacking for insurance fraud that was foiled by the aircraft's crew
- United Air Lines Flight 629, US – 1955 in-flight bombing for murder and insurance fraud
- Comair Flight 206, South Africa – 1988 in-flight suicide bombing for insurance fraud
