= Swissair Flight 330 =

Airline bombing incident in 1970

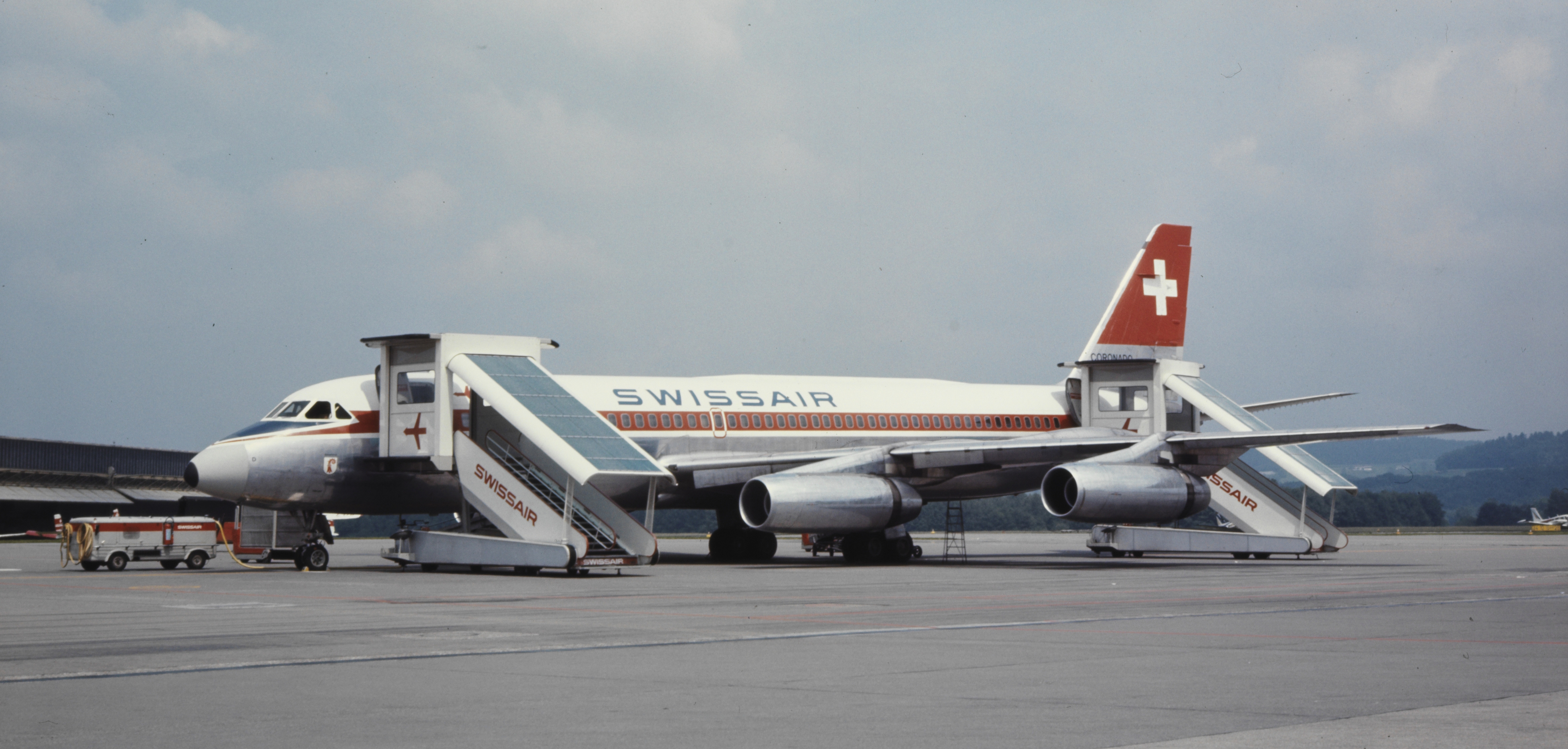
- HB-ICD, the aircraft involved, seen in 1969

Bombing
- Date: 21 February 1970
- Summary: Terrorist bombing causing loss of control
- Site: 2 km (1.3 mls) west off Würenlingen, Switzerland; 47°32′11″N 8°14′23″E

Aircraft
- Aircraft type: Convair CV-990-30A-6 Coronado
- Aircraft name: Baselland
- Operator: Swissair
- IATA flight No.: SR330
- ICAO flight No.: SWR330
- Call sign: SWISSAIR 330
- Registration: HB-ICD
- Flight origin: Zurich Airport, Switzerland
- Stopover: Tel Aviv-Lod International Airport, Israel
- Destination: Kai Tak Airport, British Hong Kong
- Occupants: 47
- Passengers: 38
- Crew: 9
- Fatalities: 47
- Survivors: 0

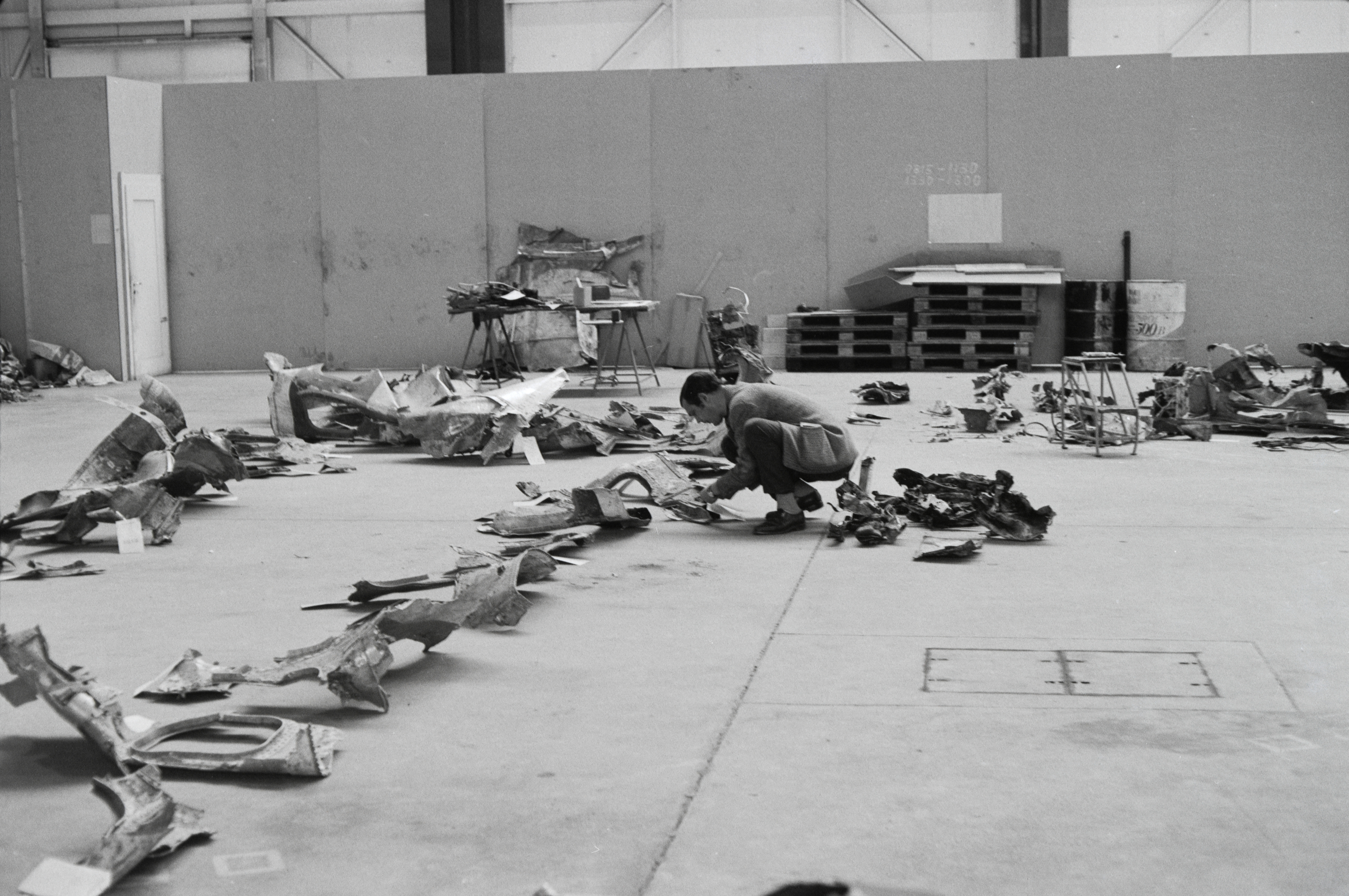
Investigation of the crash debris

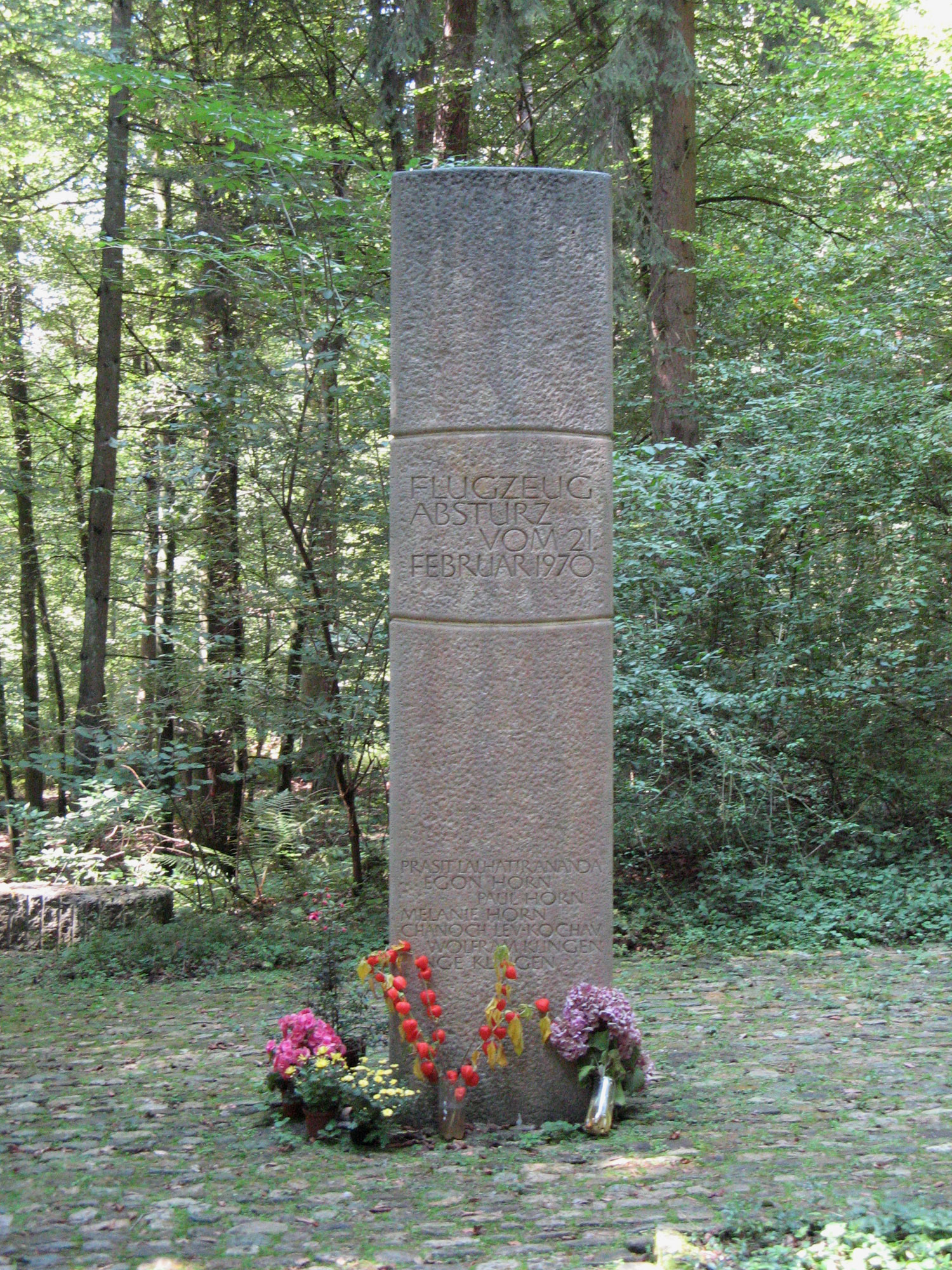
Memorial near the crash site

Swissair Flight 330 (SR330/SWR330) was a regularly scheduled passenger flight from Kloten, Switzerland, to Hong Kong (then a British colony) with an intermediate stopover in Tel Aviv, Israel. On 21 February 1970, a bomb exploded soon after takeoff, causing the plane to crash, killing all 47 passengers and crew. No one was ever charged over the attack, but some sources attribute it to the Popular Front for the Liberation of Palestine – General Command (PFLP–GC).

== History ==
Shortly after takeoff, during the ascent on a southerly course, at approximately 12:15 UTC while flying over the town of Lucerne north of the St. Gotthard Pass, a bomb detonated in the cargo hold. The crew tried to turn the plane around and attempt an emergency landing at Zurich, but had difficulty seeing the instruments due to smoke in the cockpit. The aircraft deviated more and more to the west, and crashed a short time later in a wooded area at Würenlingen near Zurich, Switzerland, due to loss of electrical power. All aboard the aircraft were killed.

A government air inspector was flown to the scene in a helicopter. He was followed shortly afterward by a team of 50 investigators. The police said that a woman handed in a 9-mm pistol found at the scene of the crash immediately after the disaster. Some of the wreckage, including pieces of cloth, was strung out on the tops and branches of trees.

Sabotage was immediately suspected. A possible motive was revenge against Switzerland for three Palestinians who had been sentenced to 12 years imprisonment by a Swiss court. According to a 2020 press report, Swiss news agencies at the time said a "splinter group" of the Palestinian Liberation Organization (PLO) had claimed responsibility, but other media reports said the group denied involvement. The PFLP-GC, which according to some sources claimed responsibility for the attack, was not a splinter of the PLO. Rather, it split from the Popular Front for the Liberation of Palestine and subsequently affiliated to the PLO.

The Swiss investigating judge, Robert Akeret, personally handed his 165-page report to the federal attorney-general, Hans Walder. According to press coverage of this report, the bombing was committed by "two members" of the PLO. The PLO is a federation of affiliate bodies, and does not have individual members.

A barometric-triggered bomb had been used. On the same day, another bomb exploded aboard an Austrian Airlines Vienna-bound Caravelle after takeoff from Frankfurt. The Caravelle landed safely.

The Swiss Federal Criminal Police (German: Bundeskriminalpolizei, French: Police judiciaire fédérale, Italian: Polizia giudiziaria federale) suspected Sufian Radi Kaddoumi and Badawi Mousa Jawher as the responsible terrorists, but it was impossible to arrest them. The investigations were closed in November 2000. Official investigations and proceedings against two other Palestinians, Yaser Qasem and Issa Abu Toboul, were in the Federal Republic of Germany already halted in 1970 despite their alleged complicity. Both were deported.

== Air traffic control transcript ==
(Start of conversation with Zurich ATC. Note: conversation of the recording begins following the initial explosion.)

Swissair 330: Ah, 330 we have trouble with the cabin compression, we have to return to Zurich.

Zurich ATC: Roger, what is your actual level?

Swissair 330: 140, request reverse course.

Zurich ATC: Roger then make a, right turn Swissair 330.

Swissair 330: Zurich from Swissair 330, we suspect an explosion in the aft compartment of the aircraft, everything is ok at the moment, but we request descent clearance immediately and firefighting equipment on the ground...for landing.

Zurich ATC: Swissair 330 say again please?

Swissair 330: We also request the police, err.....to investigate the incident.

Swissair 330: Zurich Swissair 330 we have fire on board....request an immediate landing.

Swissair 330: This is an emergency Zurich from 330.

Swissair 330: 338(0), we have an electric problem ur...(Unintelligible)

Zurich ATC: (unintelligible)

(Both ATC and pilot keyed microphones at the same time creating a small heterodyne.)

(Muffled voice from Swissair crew indicates either issues with the radio or the pilots speaking through their oxygen masks.)

Zurich ATC: Swissair 330, Swissair 330. I cannot read you anymore, I cannot read you anymore, Please continue your heading uh 330.(sound of microphone squeal).

Zurich ATC: Swissair 330 you're... fully off track now.

Swissair 330: Uh 330, can you give me my position now?

Zurich ATC: You are passing Baden (loud squeal) and stop your turn now.

Swissair 330: Impossible.

Zurich ATC: Roger 330, what is your heading you’re going through now?

Swissair 330: Declaring an emergency! We have fire and smoke on board, I can't see anything!

Swissair 330: 330 is crashing, (pause) goodbye everybody, goodbye everybody! (last transmission from aircraft)

Zurich ATC: Swissair 330, heading 080 please.

Zurich ATC: Swissair 330, please open your window please, Swissair 330 open your window please.

Zurich ATC: 330, I cannot read you anymore.

(End of recording).

A segment of the recording is publicly available on sites such as YouTube.

== Postal history ==
As noted in Kibble (The Arab Israeli Conflict: No Service, Returned & Captured Mail, 2014), on 21 February 1970 Swissair Flight 330 left Zurich, Switzerland, bound for Tel Aviv, Israel. A bomb exploded in the rear cargo compartment nine minutes after take-off. The crew attempted to turn the plane around and undertake an emergency landing at Zurich, but it crashed a short time later in a wooded area at Würenlingen, near Zurich. A bomb with an altimeter trigger was placed in a package mailed to an Israeli address by Palestinian extremists. All 47 persons on board (38 passengers and 9 crew) were killed. A small amount of mail was recovered from the crash due to the plane being loaded with mail prior to departure and allowed for the bomb to be easily hidden without ground personnel noticing.

A black instructional marking in French was applied to any mail that survived the crash, which translated reads:

Correspondence is from "Coronado" that fell at Würenlingen. Zurich 58 Post Office

The Coronado bombing saw a change in mailing practices across the globe. In particular, mail sent or routed to Israel through the UK, Italy, and the USA was required to be sent by surface mail in the immediate future. Airmail to Israel was no longer permitted.

A report from the Jewish Telegraphic Agency titled Airmail from Europe Fails to Arrive in Israel Despite Assurances It Would from 25 February 1970 states the following:

No airmail from Europe arrived in Israel today despite assurances from several airlines that deliveries would continue. At least a dozen international carriers suspended mail and cargo services to Israel following last Saturday's fatal crash of a Swissair jet. The airlines said the measure was temporary, and several announced yesterday that they were rescinding the ban. But planes of the West German Lufthansa, the British BEA, and Swissair landed at Lydda Airport today minus their mail bags. The captain of the Swissair flight refused to take outgoing mail but agreed when informed by postal authorities that he was acting contrary to his company's instructions. Israel made strong representations to the International Postal Union yesterday against any delays in foreign mail deliveries.

== Post-crash allegations ==
In a book titled Schweizer Terrorjahre: Das geheime Abkommen mit der PLO, NZZ journalist Marcel Gyr explored possible reasons why none of the suspected terrorists were convicted. Gyr's thesis is that in 1970 Switzerland and the PLO entered into a secret deal, arranged by the then Social Democratic Federal Councillor Pierre Graber, which ensured, among other things, that the two main suspects in the attack were not arrested, but above all that the Palestinians guaranteed that they would not carry out any more attacks on Swiss targets in the future. In return, Gyr posited, Switzerland granted the then-internationally isolated PLO permission to set up an office at the UN headquarters in Geneva.

In a 2016 inquiry, the Swiss parliament found no evidence of such a deal ever being agreed upon. Fritz Blankart, who served as Swiss State Secretary in 1970, also rejected the existence of the deal. In a 2020 interview, Ruedi Berlinger, son of Swissair 330 captain Karl Berlinger, stated that he does not accept the parliament's findings and called on Switzerland, the United States, Israel and Germany to open their archives fully as it relates to the crash.

== See also ==
- Timeline of airliner bombing attacks
