= Adnan Awad =

Former PLO operative

- Born: 1942 (age 83–84); Palestine
- Parent: Widad

Adnan Awad (born 1942 in Palestine) was a captain in the Palestinian Liberation Army who joined the 15 May Organization and prepared to bomb the Noga Hilton hotel in Geneva, Switzerland on August 31, 1982, but instead fled the scene and later turned himself into the American embassy in Saudi Arabia and claimed he had been pressured to join the group and wanted to renounce any terrorist connections.

== Early life ==
Born to a shopkeeper and his wife Widad in Ijzim, Adnan had an older sister. The family moved to Kiswe, Syria and Awad attended Alliance High School in Damascus.

== Aftermath ==
He was turned over to the Swiss, but later returned to the United States to help secure indictment against the 15 May leadership. With his aid, American intelligence agencies determined that it was the 15 May Organization that had constructed the bomb aboard Pan Am Flight 830.

In 1991 he co-operated with author Steven Emerson, who wrote about Awad's life in the book "Terrorist".
