= Robert Spear =

Robert Spear or Bob Spear may refer to:

- Robert Spear Hudson (1812–1884), English businessman
- Bob Spear (basketball) (1918–1995), American Air Force basketball coach
- Bob Spear (naturalist) (1920–2014), American naturalist
- Robert J. Spear, American luthier

== See also ==
- Robert Spears (disambiguation)
