= Comair Flight 206 =

1988 aviation accident

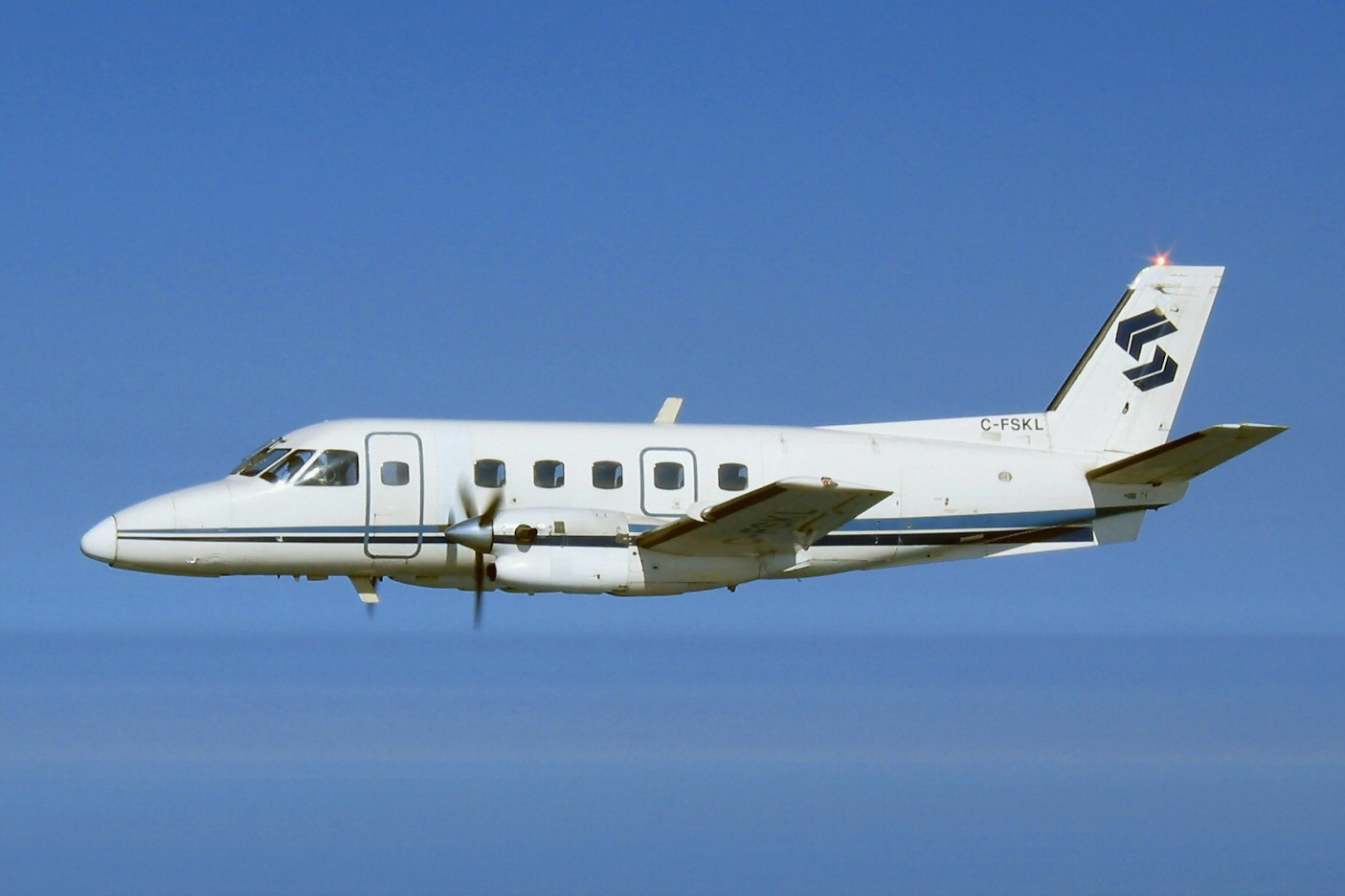
- An Embraer 110, similar to the incident aircraft

Bombing
- Date: 1 March 1988
- Summary: In-flight breakup due to suicide bombing
- Site: Germiston, near Johannesburg International Airport; 26°13′S 28°10′E

Aircraft
- Aircraft type: Embraer EMB 110 Bandeirante
- Operator: Comair
- Registration: ZS-LGP
- Flight origin: Phalaborwa Airport, South Africa
- Destination: Johannesburg International Airport, South Africa
- Occupants: 17
- Passengers: 15
- Crew: 2
- Fatalities: 17
- Survivors: 0

On Tuesday 1 March 1988, Comair Flight 206, an Embraer EMB-110P1 Bandeirante flying from Phalaborwa to Johannesburg was approaching Johannesburg International Airport to land when it broke up in flight over Germiston.

== Aircraft ==
The aircraft involved was a 1982-built Embraer EMB-110P1 Bandeirante, with serial number 110402 and registration ZS-LGP. It was powered by two Pratt & Whitney Canada PT6A-34 turboprop engines and was designed to carry for 18 passengers. The aircraft was initially registered as PT-SFT when manufactured by Embraer. The aircraft was delivered to British CSE Aviation in December 1983 and registered as G-BKZX. On 20 January 1984 the aircraft was transferred to South Africa's Bop Air (Bophuthatswana Air) and was re-registered as ZS-LGP. The aircraft was one of three Embraer EMB 110s operated by Bop Air.

== Passengers ==
15 passengers were on board the flight from Phalaborwa to Johannesburg. Phalaborwa is an economic and tourist hub for mineral and ore extraction at the Phalaborwa Igneous Complex and the town's proximity to the Kruger National Park, respectively. Eleven passengers and both crew members were from South Africa. There were also two couples, one Austrian, and another West German, both of whom were returning from a safari at Kruger National Park.

== Crew ==
The crew consisted of captain Geoff Neil, aged 38, first officer Stan Wainer, aged 28.

== Accident ==
Takeoff and the cruise were uneventful. During approach to Johannesburg at dusk at 5:25 PM local time, the pilots reported to air traffic control that they were preparing to land. No problems on board were reported during this final radio call. At 5:28 PM, witnesses reported hearing an explosion and saw the aircraft break apart in mid-air over an industrial park in Germiston, just 13 kilometers south O.R Tambo International Airport. One section of the fuselage crashed into a Coca-Cola factory. There were no survivors. The cockpit was found a quarter of a kilometer away from the rest of the fuselage, despite the flight having been relatively low at the time of the accident.

== Victims ==
Most of the debris and bodies were recovered from the roofs of the factory. Of those killed, 13 were locals, four were tourists.

Nationality	Passengers	Crew	Total
South Africa	11	2	13
Austria	2	-	2
West Germany	2	-	2
Total	15	2	17

== Investigation ==
Reports indicated an explosive device on board; investigators determined that a bomb containing nitroglycerin and ammonium nitrate had been detonated on board the aircraft. The bomber was 33-year-old Emil Schultz, a South African miner who was heavily in debt and experiencing marital problems. He had previously worked on a farm, and then as a mine supervisor. In both jobs, Schultz had access to explosives and materials to build a bomb. He had taken out a large life insurance policy shortly before the flight.

The investigation identified deficiencies in Phalaborwa Airport's security. Only passengers' checked bags were examined while their carry-on bags were not, and no body scans were performed. Investigators assumed that Schultz had likely brought the bomb on board in his hand luggage, but could not prove his involvement beyond a reasonable doubt.

== Aftermath ==
Comair continued to use the flight code on a different route between Durban and Johannesburg up until their financial collapse in 2022.

== Similar incidents ==
- Federal Express Flight 705, unsuccessful hijacking attempt for insurance fraud.
- Continental Airlines Flight 11, in-flight suicide bombing for insurance fraud.
- National Airlines Flight 2511, suffered an explosion in midair, suspected suicide bombing.
- United Air Lines Flight 629, bombing as part of a revenge murder and life insurance fraud.
- Avianca Flight 203, in-flight bombing ordered by the Medellín Cartel.

== See also ==
- Suicide bombing
