= 15 May Organization =

Former Palestinian Arab nationalist militant organization

Founded in 1979, the 15 May Organization or Abu Ibrahim Faction was a minor breakout faction from Wadie Haddad's Popular Front for the Liberation of Palestine – External Operations (PFLP-EO).

== History ==
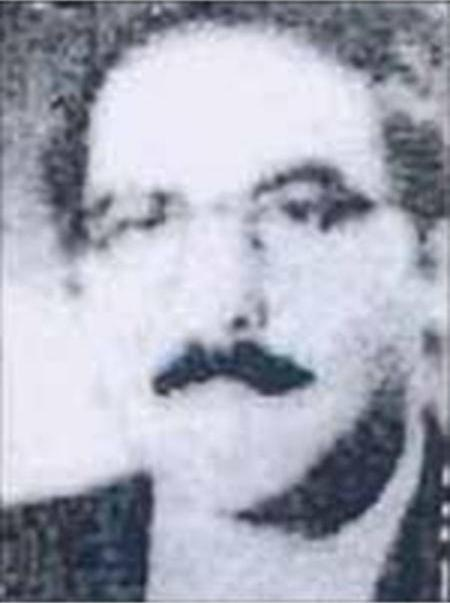
Black-and-white mugshot of Husayn Muhammad Al-Umari, the founder of the 15 May Organization

The name is drawn from 15 May 1948, the day that the British Mandate over Palestine ended and the 1948 Arab–Israeli War began.

The group was led by Muhammad al-Umari (kunya: Abu Ibrahim), and took credit for several bombings of international targets in the early 1980s, including hotels and airliners, but is believed to have disbanded after members joined Fatah radical Col. Hawari's Fatah Special Operations Group.

== Operations ==
In 1980, in the group's first attack was against the Royal Hotel in London, England, ostensibly because of its high number of Jewish patrons. The 21-year-old Palestinian-Iraqi Mohammed Zuhair travelled from Baghdad into an unnamed European country, and finally arrived in London, with several kilograms of plastic explosives hidden inside his suitcase. He rented a room in the centre of the fifth floor, where Ibrahim had hoped an explosion might cause enough structural damage to cause the building to collapse. The bomb detonated prematurely on 17 January however, and killed only Zuhair himself; injuring several hotel guests. After his death, his photograph was hung in one of Ibrahim's safe houses, and Capt. Mohammed Rashid named his son after Zuhair.

In 1981, the group organised the bombing of Israeli airline El Al offices in Rome and Istanbul, as well as the Israeli embassies in Athens and Vienna.

The following year, the group unsuccessfully attempted to bomb a Pan Am flight in Rio de Janeiro, and then successfully detonated a bomb, killing only one passenger, aboard Pan Am Flight 830 on 11 August. The latter attack was orchestrated by Rashid, who was imprisoned for his actions.

In 1985, the group recruited a Tunisian to carry out a bombing attack against a department store in Paris in February.

== Downfall ==
The 15 May Organization is believed to have been sponsored by Iraq, and founder Abu Ibrahim was believed by US authorities to have relocated there after the group disbanded.

Twenty days after the unsuccessful bombing by Rashid, construction contractor Adnan Awad turned himself over to the American Embassy in Saudi Arabia and claimed that he had been pressured into joining the group. He was turned over to the Swiss, but later returned to the United States to help secure indictment against the 15 May leadership. With his aid, American intelligence agencies determined that it was the 15 May Organization that had constructed the bomb aboard Pan Am Flight 830.

Abu Ibrahim was placed on the FBI's most wanted in June 2009.

== See also ==
- Abu Nidal Organization
- Black September Organization
