= Adnan Erkan =

Turkish footballer

Personal information
- Date of birth: 15 January 1968 (age 58)
- Place of birth: Denizli, Turkey
- Position: Goalkeeper

Senior career*
Years	Team	Apps	(Gls)
–1993	Konyaspor		
1993–2000	Ankaragücü		
2000–2002	Denizlispor		
2002–2003	Mersin Idman Yurdu		

International career
1996	Turkey	1	(0)
- * Club domestic league appearances and goals

Adnan Erkan (born 15 January 1968 in Denizli) is a Turkish retired footballer who played as a goalkeeper.

He played mostly for Ankaragücü and Denizlispor.

Erkan made one appearance for the senior Turkey national football team and was a participant at the 1996 UEFA European Championship.
