= Adnan Sadık Erzi =

Turkish scholar

Adnan Sadık Erzi (2 February 1923 – 5 June 1990) was a Turkish Professor of History. He specialized in the research of Persian manuscripts and historical texts, and was considered an expert in this field.

He was born in the village of Hasan Halik near Fatih in Istanbul to Sadık Bey and Ulviye Hanım.

Erzi attended Kabataş Erkek Lisesi High School, and following it, got enrolled in the Department of History of the Faculty of Literature at Istanbul University.

After graduating in 1947, he started to work for the Society of Turkish History as a librarian and publications specialist. In April of the same year, Erzi became library manager of the Faculty of Language and History/Geography at Ankara University. In 1950 he was a research assistant for the Chair of Ottoman History at the same institution, where he worked with Bekir Sıtkı Baykal. In March 1950, Erzi defended his Ph.D. thesis, titled "Selçuklu Tarihinin Kaynakları" (The Sources of Saljuq History) at the Faculty of Literature of Istanbul University. From 1952 to 1957, Erzi was visiting researcher to Italy, Austria, England, The Netherlands and Germany. In 1957 he was appointed an associate professor at the Faculty of Theology of Ankara University.

He visited the United States on a research trip from 1957 to 1958. After his return to Turkey, he taught from 1959 to 1960 at Atatürk University in Erzurum as the chair of Medieval History. In late 1960 he returned to Ankara University as the chair of Modern History at the Faculty of Language and History/Geography. That same year he became deputy director of the Turkish Religions Society (Diyanet İşleri Başkanlıǧı). After 1962 he traveled extensively for research, attending conferences and giving lectures in countries such as Iran, Iraq and Syria from September to December 1962, as well as Dakar and Lahore in July 1963 to do research on Islamic manuscripts. From 15 September to 15 November 1964 he did research at the National Library of Vienna. In 1965 he went to England and France, in 1968–69 to Tabriz in Iran, in 1970 to Baghdad and Moscow, in 1971 to India, in 1972 to Cyprus, in 1973 to Islamabad, in 1974–75 to Iran and Germany. In 1975–76 he was sent to teach at Fırat University in Elazıǧ. In 1977 and 1979 he worked and did research at Bonyād-e Farhang-e Irān in Tehran. He returned to Tehran in 1981 and also traveled to Madrid, Tunis and Vienna in the next couple of years. On 4 March 1986 he was made professor emeritus. He died on 5 June 1990 in Istanbul.

== Sources ==
- Özgüdenlı, Osman G.; Uyar, Mustafa. "ERZİ, ADNAN SADIK". Encyclopaedia Iranica.
