= Adnan Yıldız =

Turkish footballer

Personal information
- Full name: Adnan Yıldız
- Date of birth: 19 August 1966 (age 60)
- Place of birth: Etimesgut, Turkey
- Height: 1.90 m (6 ft 3 in)
- Position: Central defender

Senior career*
Years	Team	Apps	(Gls)
1990–1992	Bursaspor	22	(0)
1992–1993	Boluspor		
1993–1994	Dardanelspor		
1994–1995	Zeytinburnuspor		
1995–1996	Kütahyaspor		
1996–1997	Üsküdar Anadolu SK		
- * Club domestic league appearances and goals

Adnan Yıldız (born 19 September 1966), is a former Turkish footballer who played as a defender.

== Career ==
Born in Etimesgut, Yıldız played professional football for Bursaspor in the Süper Lig.
