= Robert Spears (naturopath) =

American naturopath and possible mass murderer

Robert Vernon Spears (June 26, 1894 – May 2, 1969) was a naturopath who is alleged to have placed a bomb aboard National Airlines Flight 967, an aircraft that went missing over the Gulf of Mexico on November 16, 1959, killing 42 people.

== History ==
Spears had a long history of crime, having been arrested 17 times under 14 different aliases. He had become financially successful in Texas as a naturopath, even becoming president of the Texas Naturopath Association in 1954. But in 1957 he was expelled from the organization in a bribery scandal. He moved to California and took up hypnotism, his business was with a doctor performing abortions (which were then illegal in the U.S.). He was charged with three felony accounts and was set to stand trial in Los Angeles on December 3, 1959.

Investigators learned that William Taylor, a fellow felon and longtime criminal accomplice of Spears, had boarded Flight 967 using a ticket made out to "Dr. Spears." The theory arose that Spears, desperate to avoid trial and wanting a fresh start, had tricked Taylor (perhaps through hypnosis) into boarding the aircraft with a piece of luggage containing a bomb; when the aircraft crashed, it would be assumed that Spears was on board. His wife would then cash in an insurance policy for $100,000 on Spears' life. However, Taylor himself purchased $37,500.00 worth of life insurance at the airport; when his ex-wife attempted to collect on that policy, authorities were notified. It was determined that Taylor had boarded the flight using a ticket issued for Spears.

Spears was eventually arrested in Phoenix after being turned in by the ex-wife of a fellow naturopath in Arizona. In February 1960, Spears was convicted of interstate transportation of a stolen car (Taylor's Plymouth). He was sentenced to the maximum term of 5 years. Spears also received a 2-to-5 year sentence in California after pleading guilty to performing illegal abortions. While in prison, Spears confessed to having knowledge of the "probability of a bomb aboard the airplane." Due to a lack of evidence, however, he was never charged with any offense in relation to the Flight 967 crash.

Spears died in Dallas, Texas on May 2, 1969, of coronary thrombosis.

== External links and references ==
- "Accident description for Douglas DC-7B N4891C, Monday 16 November 1959". Aviation Safety Network.
- Civil Aeronautics Board Aircraft Accident Report on Flight 967 from the Department of Transport's Special Collections
- List of passenger airline bombings from Aerospace.org (scroll down for information on Flight 967)
