= Pan Am Flight 830 =

1982 airliner bombing

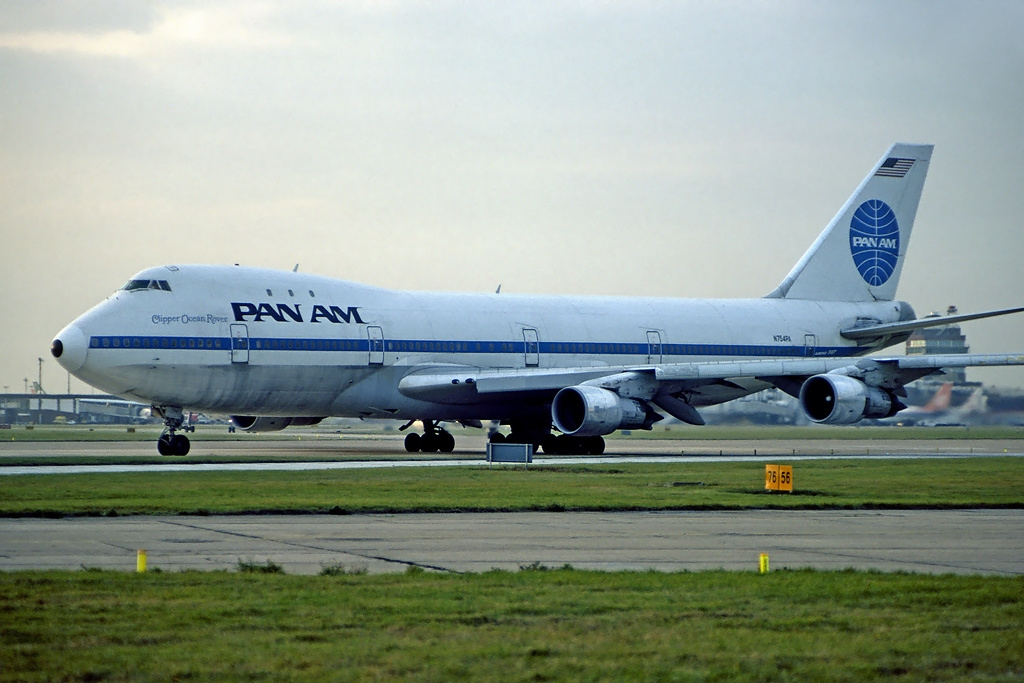
- The aircraft involved in 1983, one year after the bombing

Bombing
- Date: August 11, 1982
- Summary: Terrorist bombing
- Site: Pacific Ocean, NW of Hawaii; 23.5095°N 160.5728°W

Aircraft
- Aircraft type: Boeing 747-121
- Aircraft name: Clipper Ocean Rover
- Operator: Pan American World Airways
- Call sign: CLIPPER 830
- Registration: N754PA
- Flight origin: New Tokyo International Airport (now Narita International Airport)
- Stopover: Honolulu International Airport
- Destination: Los Angeles International Airport
- Occupants: 285
- Passengers: 270
- Crew: 15
- Fatalities: 1
- Injuries: 16
- Survivors: 284

Pan Am Flight 830 was a scheduled international flight from New Tokyo International Airport (now known as Narita International Airport) in Tokyo, Japan, to Los Angeles International Airport in Los Angeles, California via Honolulu International Airport in Hawaii. On August 11, 1982, the Boeing 747-121 serving the flight, nicknamed Clipper Ocean Rover, was en route to Hawaii when the airplane was damaged by a bomb that had been placed on board. Despite the damage to the aircraft, Captain James E. "Skipper" O'Halloran III, of Spokane, Washington, First Officer Ray Schuller, and Engineer Neil H. Nordquist, of Novato, California were able to land in Honolulu safely. One person was killed while 284 survived; 16 of them were wounded.

== Flight ==
At the time of the explosion, the aircraft was approximately 225 kilometers (140 mi; 121 nmi) northwest of Hawaii, cruising at 36,000 feet (11,000 m) with 270 passengers and 15 crew on board. The bomb, which had been placed under a seat cushion, killed 16 year-old Toru Ozawa, a Japanese national. The blast also injured 16 other people (including Ozawa's parents) and caused damage to the floor and ceiling. The aircraft remained airborne and made an emergency landing in Honolulu with no further loss of life.

== Aftermath ==
The bomb was placed by Mohammed Rashed, a Jordanian linked to the 15 May Organization. After 6 years, in 1988, he was arrested in Greece, tried, convicted of murder and sentenced to 15 years in prison. He was paroled in 1996 after serving eight years. He was later extradited to the US from Egypt in 1998 to stand trial. In 2006, as part of a plea bargain agreement he was sentenced to a further seven years in federal prison. As per his agreement with US prosecutors in providing information about other terrorist plots, he was released from prison in March 2013 but as of March 2014 still remained in a federal immigration detention facility in upstate New York awaiting deportation. Rashed was relocated to Mauritania in November 2016.

Husayn Muhammad al-Umari (also known as Abu Ibrahim) was also indicted in the bombing of Pan Am Flight 830 and in 2009 was placed on the FBI Most Wanted Terrorists list. On November 24, 2009, the Department of State announced a reward of up to $5 million for the capture of Abu Ibrahim, then about 73 years old. The previous reward of $200,000 had produced no results. As of May 2026, he is still at large.

== See also ==
- Philippine Airlines Flight 434 - a similar incident perpetrated by Ramzi Yousef
