= National Airlines Flight 967 =

1959 aviation accident

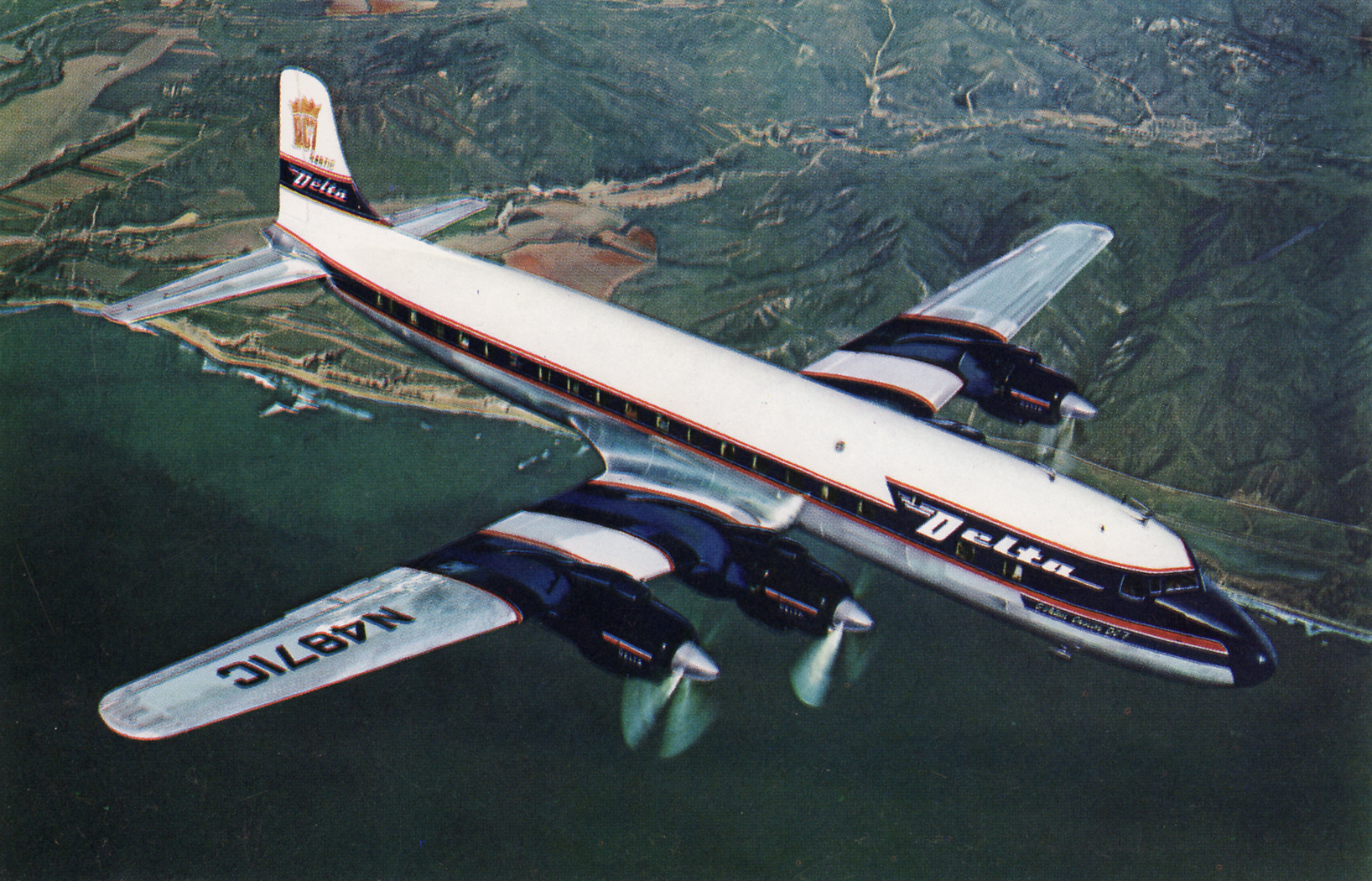
- A Delta Air Lines DC-7, similar to the accident aircraft

Accident
- Date: November 16, 1959
- Summary: In-flight explosion (Bombing suspected, but not proven)
- Site: Gulf of Mexico; 28.57°N 86.33°W

Aircraft
- Aircraft type: Douglas DC-7B
- Operator: National Airlines (on an interchange flight with Delta Air Lines and American Airlines)
- Registration: N4891C
- Passengers: 36
- Crew: 6
- Fatalities: 42
- Survivors: 0

National Airlines Flight 967, registration N4891C, was a Douglas DC-7B aircraft that disappeared over the Gulf of Mexico en route from Tampa, Florida, to New Orleans, Louisiana, on November 16, 1959. All 42 on board were presumed killed in the incident.

== Details of accident ==
The flight originated in Miami at 10:22 PM the previous evening, landed at Tampa at 11:00 PM, and departed for New Orleans at 11:22 PM. The last radio contact with the flight was at 12:44 AM, when the flight contacted company radio in New Orleans. Radar operators at a military station at Houma, Louisiana, picked up the flight at 12:46 AM. Flight 967 was an interchange flight between three carriers; through plane service from Miami to Los Angeles. National Airlines operated the first two legs between Miami and Tampa, and Tampa and New Orleans. Delta Air Lines was scheduled to operate the flight between New Orleans, and its next stop, Dallas, TX, where American Airlines was to take over and operate the same aircraft from Dallas nonstop to Los Angeles. Interchange flights like this were fairly common before the CAB awarded more direct routes beginning with the Southeast to West Coast case in 1961. The aircraft being used this particular day was a Delta Air Lines DC-7B.

Capt. Frank E. Todd of Miami, the pilot, radioed his last message at 12:44 a.m. He reported a "smooth flight" and unlimited visibility, but said he could see a solid overcast of fog ahead. He was cleared by the New Orleans Air Route Traffic Control Center (ARTCC - ZNO) located in the terminal building at New Orleans Lakefront Airport to descend to and maintain 5,000 feet and to report leaving 8,000 feet. This air traffic control instruction/clearance was issued through National Airlines' radio station/office at Pensacola, Florida, a normal procedure before making the approach to Moisant International Airport (KMSY) in New Orleans. At that time, the control tower at Moisant reported a ceiling of 1,200 feet with three-fourths of a mile visibility, light fog and rain.

It continued on a track of 296 degrees magnetic for a few minutes, then turned right to a heading of approximately 010 degrees and disappeared from the scope at 12:51 AM. At 1:16 AM, company radio attempted to contact Flight 967 to no avail; attempts by FAA en route facilities, New Orleans Approach Control, and air traffic control were unable to raise the flight. Search and rescue aircraft spotted scattered debris and a number of bodies in the vicinity of the last radar return, about 35 miles east of Pilottown, Louisiana; the remains of 10 individuals were eventually located. The main section of the wreckage has never been found despite the efforts of Navy and Coast Guard divers.

According to the Nov. 17, 1959, edition of the New York Times, I. W. Dymond, vice president of operations for the airline, said the weather "was anticipated, but it was not a factor" in the crash. He added that New Orleans had instrument meteorological conditions, and indicated that the crew had planned to use this method on the approach until the plane was below the low ceiling. Lieut. James L. Sigman, executive officer of the Coast Guard station at New Orleans, said the plane might have exploded when it struck the water. The bodies were stripped of clothing and revealed severe burns, he said. He added that the passengers apparently had no warning to don lifebelts, as only one life preserver was found among the debris.

However, the Clearfield, Pennsylvania, Progress speculated in its Nov. 17, 1959, edition that the aircraft may have been brought down by a bomb: "Was there an explosion aboard the National Airlines DC-7B liner that crashed in the Gulf of Mexico Monday with 42 persons aboard? If there was, did it come before or after the crash? Members of the party hunting in the shark-infested waters for bodies believe there was an explosion. But they don't agree on when it occurred. Lt. James L. Sigman, executive officer of the Coast Guard air detachment at New Orleans, said the wreckage was spread over a comparatively small area of two to three miles. This indicated to him that the explosion took place after the plane hit the water. But two Air Force fliers who spent four hours over the scene said because the wreckage was so scattered, it seemed to them the plane exploded in the air."

One passenger, William Taylor, had boarded the flight using a ticket issued to Robert Vernon Spears, a convicted criminal working at the time as a naturopath. A hypothesis arose that Spears, who had befriended Taylor in prison, tricked Taylor into boarding the flight with a piece of luggage containing a bomb. When the aircraft was destroyed, authorities would assume that Spears had himself been a victim and his wife would be able to collect on his life insurance. However, Taylor purchased life insurance in his own name at the airport before departure; when his ex-wife applied to collect, the substitution was discovered. Spears disappeared after the accident but was arrested in Phoenix, Arizona, with Taylor's car in January, 1960. He was charged with unlawful possession of an automobile, for which he was convicted and received the maximum sentence of five years. Due to a lack of evidence, he was never charged in the alleged bombing of Flight 967. Spears died in Baylor Medical Center, Dallas on May 2, 1969, of coronary thrombosis. There was no evidence of any connection between Spears and the accident.

The Civil Aeronautics Board (predecessor of the NTSB) did not find a probable cause for the accident due to the lack of evidence.

== See also ==
- Aviation safety
- List of accidents and incidents involving commercial aircraft
