= Edward Orrick McDonnell =

United States Navy Medal of Honor recipient and vice admiral

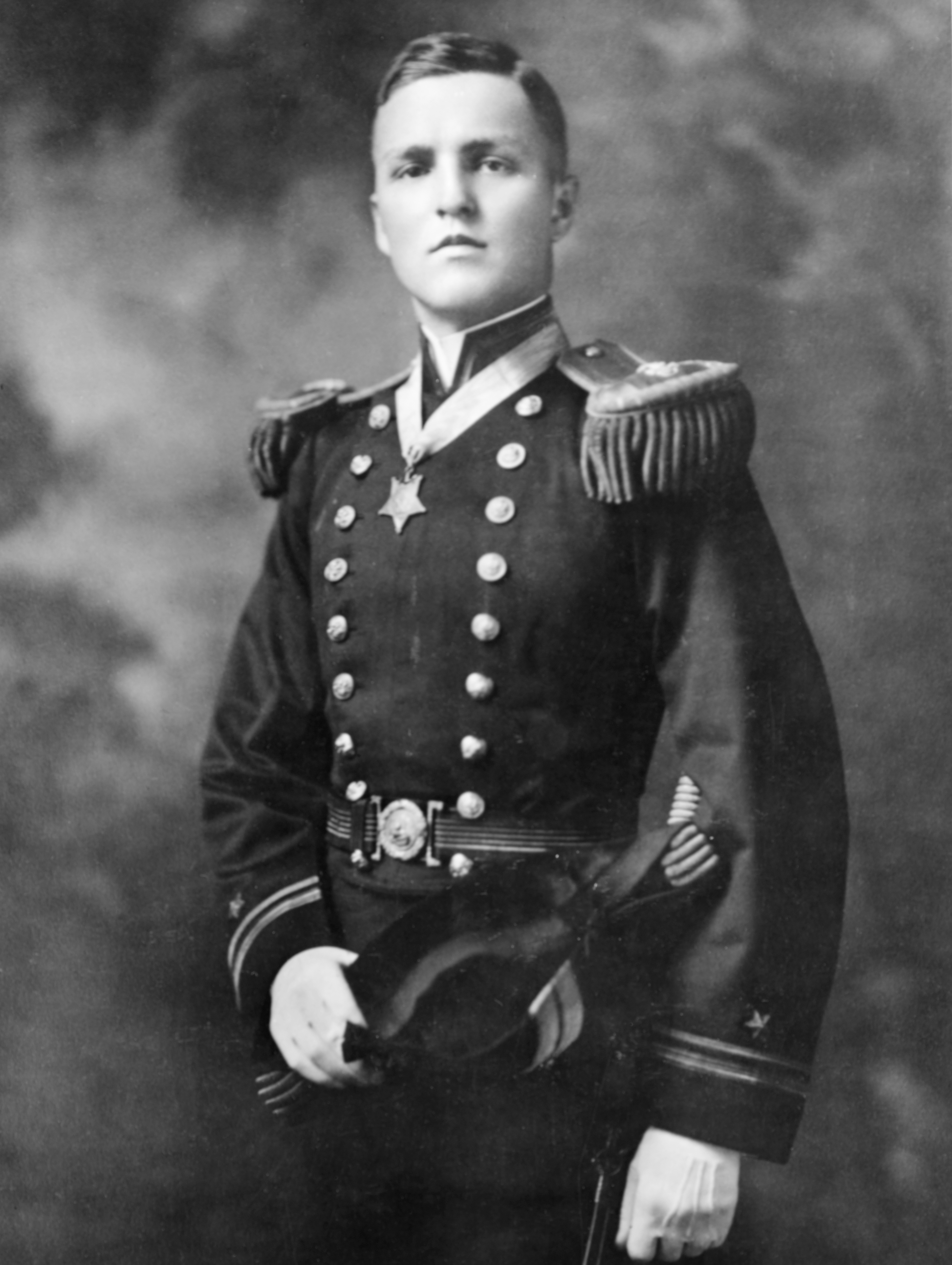
- United States Navy Medal of Honor recipient
- Born: November 13, 1891; Baltimore, Maryland, U.S.
- Died: January 6, 1960 (aged 68); Bolivia, North Carolina, U.S.
- Burial place: Arlington National Cemetery, Virginia, U.S.
- Military career
- Allegiance: United States
- Branch: United States Navy
- Service years: 1912–1951
- Rank: Vice Admiral
- Commands: USS Nehenta Bay; USS Long Island; NAS New York City
- Conflicts: Battle of Veracruz; World War I World War II
- Awards: Medal of Honor; Navy Cross; Bronze Star Medal; Air Medal

Edward Orrick McDonnell (November 13, 1891 – January 6, 1960) was an American vice admiral and Medal of Honor recipient.

== Biography ==
McDonnell was born on November 13, 1891 in Baltimore, Maryland. He graduated from the United States Naval Academy in 1912. He received the Medal of Honor for actions at the United States occupation of Veracruz, 1914.

Sent for aeronautical instruction at the Wright Company in Dayton, Ohio and flight training at Naval Air Station Pensacola, McDonnell was designated a naval aviator in March 1915. He then served as an aviation instructor at NAS Pensacola and at NAS Huntington Bay, Long Island, New York. On August 14, 1917, McDonnell took off from NAS Huntington Bay in a seaplane and conducted a test launch of an aerial torpedo. The torpedo hit the water at a bad angle and bounced, nearly hitting his aircraft. During World War I, he served as an aviator in France and Italy from late 1917 to September 1918.

On March 10, 1919, Lieutenant Commander McDonnell flew a British-built Sopwith Camel off an overhauled gun turret on the USS Texas and thus became the first man to fly an airplane off a battleship.

In January 1920, McDonnell transferred to the active reserves. He worked as an executive for several New York City investment houses, eventually becoming a partner at Hornblower & Weeks. As a reserve naval aviator, McDonnell had active-duty assignments at NAS Pensacola and aboard the seaplane tender Wright.

Promoted to commander in July 1940, McDonnell traveled as a naval observer on the first Pan American Airways flight to the southwest Pacific. In October 1940, he was recalled to active duty. In early 1941, McDonnell served as air attaché in London before being transferred to the U.S. embassy in Peiping. In July 1941, he was given command of Naval Air Station New York City and also made District Aviation Officer for the Third Naval District.

After United States entry into World War II, McDonnell was promoted to captain in December 1941 and then to rear admiral in 1942. In June 1943, he transferred to a staff position at the Naval Air Training Center in Corpus Christi, Texas. In May 1944, his rank reverted to captain so that he could command the escort carriers Long Island from July to December 1944 and Nehenta Bay from December 1944 to September 1945.

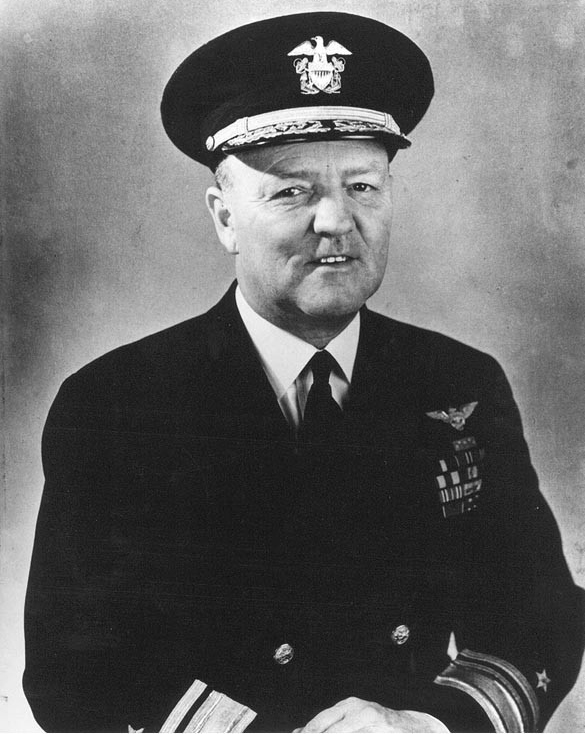
McDonnell c. 1948

Released from active duty in December 1945, McDonnell became a rear admiral in the naval reserves. When he retired permanently in December 1951, he was advanced to vice admiral on the reserve retired list.

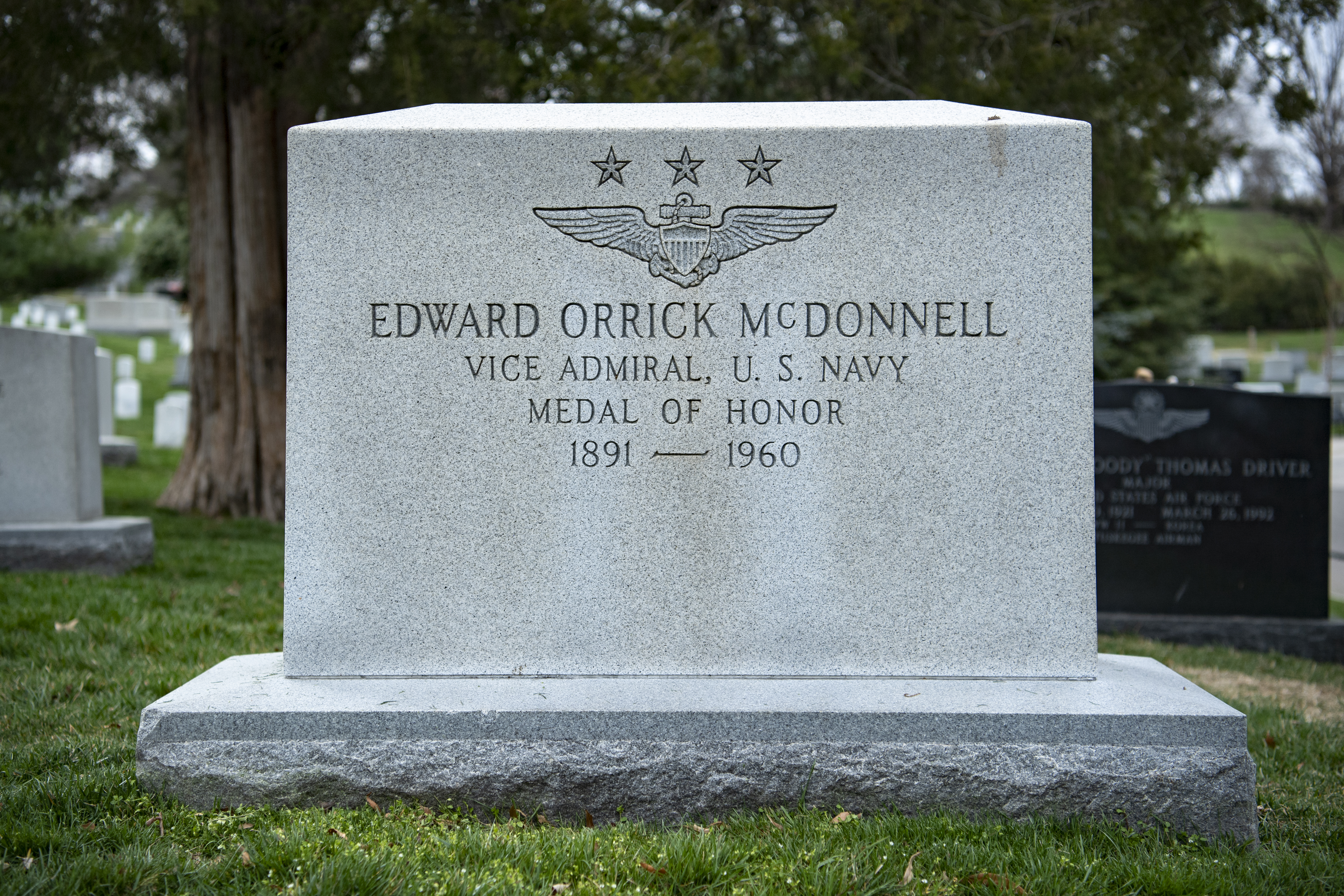
Grave at Arlington National Cemetery

Vice Admiral McDonnell died in the 1960 bombing of National Airlines Flight 2511 in Bolivia, North Carolina. At the time of his death, he was living in Mill Neck, Long Island and traveling from New York to Miami, where he had a vacation home in Hobe Sound, Florida. McDonnell was serving as a director on the boards of Pan Am and Hertz. He was buried at Arlington National Cemetery.

== Medal of Honor citation ==
Rank: Ensign, Organization: U.S. Navy, Born:13 November 1891, Baltimore, Md., Accredited to: Maryland, Date of issue: 12/04/1915

Citation:

For extraordinary heroism in battle, engagements of Vera Cruz, 21 and 22 April 1914. Posted on the roof of the Terminal Hotel and landing, Ens. McDonnell established a signal station there day and night, maintaining communication between troops and ships. At this exposed post he was continually under fire. One man was killed and 3 wounded at his side during the 2 days' fighting. He showed extraordinary heroism and striking courage and maintained his station in the highest degree of efficiency. All signals got through, largely due to his heroic devotion to duty.

== Navy Cross citation ==
Rank: Lieutenant Commander, Organization: U.S. Navy, Date of issue: 10/18/1919

Citation:

For distinguished and heroic service as a pilot attached to U.S. naval aviation forces abroad. Lieutenant Commander McDonnell took an important and valuable part in organizing U. S. northern bombing group. He made several extremely hazardous flights over the Alps in machines which were known to be structurally imperfect.

== Namesake ==
The frigate USS Edward McDonnell was named in his memory.

== See also ==
- List of Medal of Honor recipients (Veracruz)
- List of United States Naval Academy alumni (Medal of Honor)
- List of unsolved murders (1900–1979)
