= USS Prairie (AD-5) =

Tender of the United States Navy

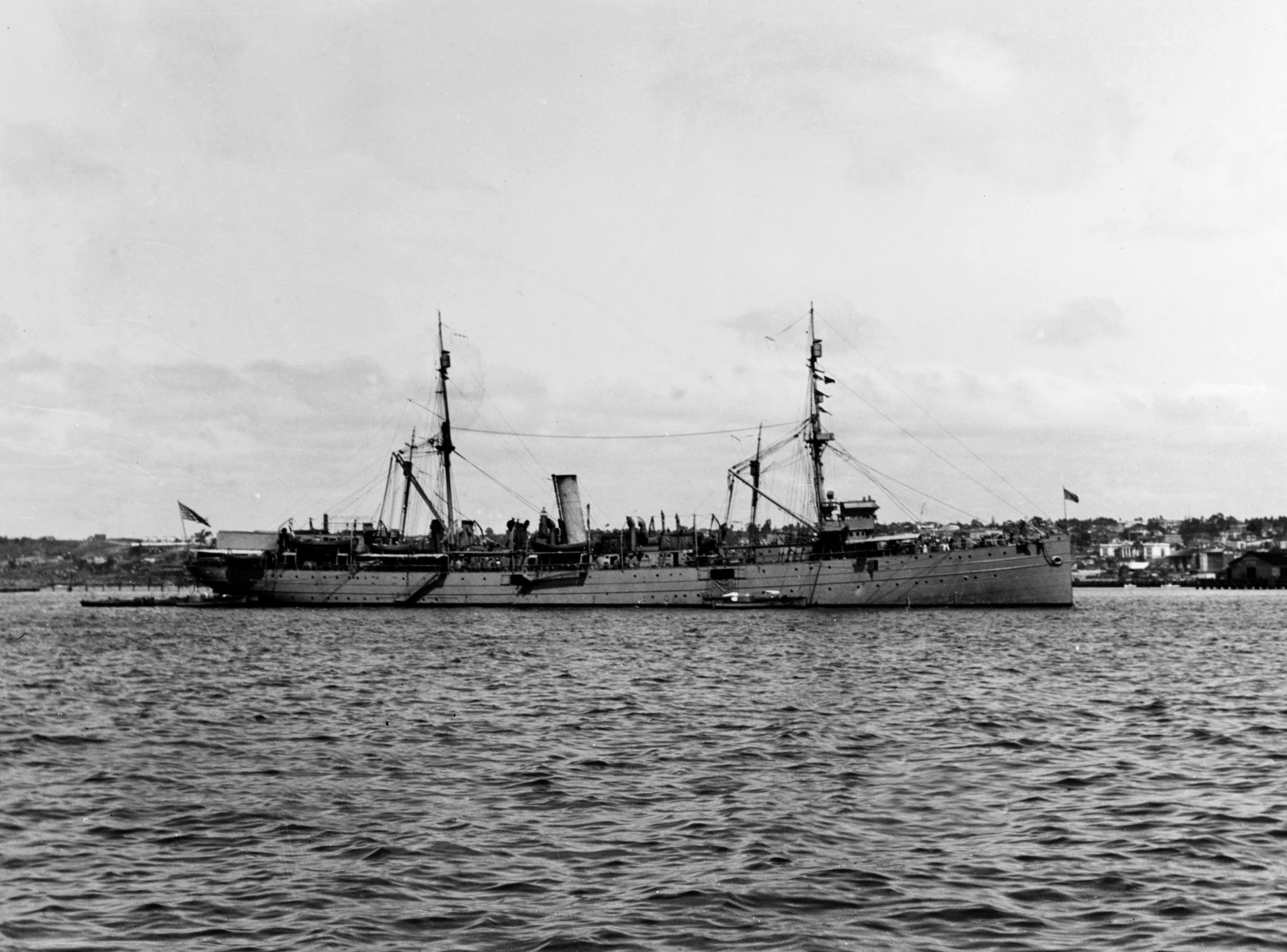
- USS Prairie (AD-5) at anchor off San Diego, circa in 1920

History

United States
- Name: Prairie
- Builder: William Cramp & Sons, Philadelphia
- Yard number: 267
- Launched: 27 September 1890
- Completed: 1890
- Acquired: 6 April 1898
- Commissioned: 8 April 1898 – 15 March 1899; 23 March 1899 – 18 February 1901; 9 November 1901 – 14 June 1905; 26 September 1906 – 22 November 1922
- Stricken: 22 November 1922
- Identification: AD-5
- Fate: Sold and scrapped 1923

General characteristics
- Displacement: 6,620 light tons
- Length: 404 ft 9 in (123.37 m)
- Beam: 48 ft 3 in (14.71 m)
- Draft: 20 ft 9 in (6.32 m)
- Speed: 15 knots (28 km/h; 17 mph)
- Armament: 10 × 6"/30 caliber guns; 6 × 6-pounder Hotchkiss guns

USS Prairie (AD-5), formerly Morgan Liner SS El Sol, was built in 1890 by William Cramp & Sons, Philadelphia. She was purchased by the United States Navy on 6 April 1898 from the Southern Pacific Company, and commissioned two days later at New York, Commander Charles J. Train in command.

== History ==
Prairie was converted into an auxiliary cruiser and assigned at first to the Northern Patrol Squadron and later to the North Atlantic Fleet. During the Spanish–American War, she served in Cuban waters July and August 1898. On 25 August she stranded in dense fog 3 miles east of the Amagansett, New York Life saving Station. The United States Life Saving Service ferried 216 troops to shore. She was pulled off the next day by the tug Brittania. She returned to Fore River, Massachusetts, on 28 August. She decommissioned on 15 March 1899 at Philadelphia.

Prairie was placed in reserve commission on 23 March 1899 and cruised with the naval militia off the Atlantic coast until she was decommissioned at New York on 18 February 1901. She carried government exhibits to France at the turn of the 20th century for the Paris Exposition. She was recommissioned at Boston on 9 November 1901 as a training ship, and remained with this mission until she was decommissioned at Boston on 14 June 1905.

She was recommissioned 26 September 1906 at Boston as a transport and was attached to the Atlantic Fleet. She protected American interests in Cuba, March to April 1907. Later, she resumed her training duties with the naval militia from May to September 1907, July to August 1908 and July to August 1909.

She transported 750 Marines to Santo Domingo in 1912 during the civil war there. She took part on the U.S. occupation of Veracruz in 1914, firing her 3-inch guns at the Naval Academy and other tactical targets, on 21 April 1914.

Converted to a destroyer tender in late 1917, Prairie served during World War I.

Prairie was decommissioned for the final time on 22 November 1922 at San Diego, California, and was struck from the Navy List. She was sold on 22 June 1923 to Louis Rothenberg, Oakland, California.
