= List of University of Colorado Law School alumni =

Following is a list of notable alumni of the University of Colorado Law School.

== Academia ==
- Frances Olsen (J.D. 1971), professor of law at UCLA
- Manuel Ramos (J.D. 1973), novelist who also has taught Chicano literature courses at Metropolitan State University of Denver

== Business ==
- Maggie L. Fox, CEO of the Alliance for Climate Protection
- Louis O. Kelso (LL.B. 1938), founder of private equity firm Kelso & Company, inventor of the Employee Stock Ownership Plan
- Floyd Odlum (LL.B. 1914), founder of Atlas Corporation, owner of RKO

== Government ==
- Anne Gorsuch Burford (J.D. 1964), former administrator of the Environmental Protection Agency
- Michael L. Connor, former commissioner U.S. Bureau of Reclamation and former deputy secretary of the U.S. Department of Interior

== Judiciary ==
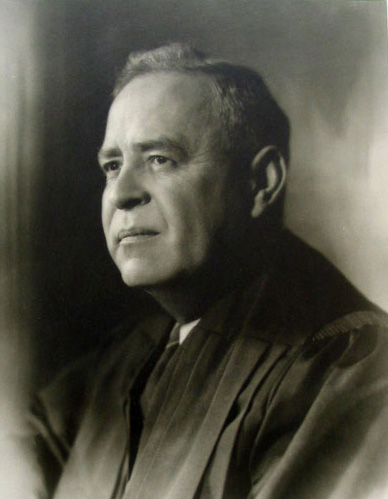
Wiley Rutledge '22 served on the Supreme Court of the United States from 1943 to 1949.

=== U.S. Supreme Court justices and federal appeals court judges ===
- Jean Sala Breitenstein (LL.B. 1924), former judge of the U.S. Court of Appeals for the Tenth Circuit
- William Edward Doyle (LL.B. 1940), former judge of the U.S. Court of Appeals for the Tenth Circuit
- Wiley Blount Rutledge (LL.B. 1922), former associate justice of the Supreme Court of the United States
- Timothy Tymkovich (J.D. 1982), judge of the U.S. Court of Appeals for the Tenth Circuit, former solicitor general of Colorado

=== U.S. district court judges ===
- Alfred A. Arraj (LL.B. 1928), former judge of the United States District Court for the District of Colorado
- Robert E. Blackburn (J.D. 1974), judge of the United States District Court for the District of Colorado
- Olin Hatfield Chilson (LL.B. 1927), former judge of the United States District Court for the District of Colorado
- Larry R. Hicks (J.D. 1968), judge of United States District Court for the District of Nevada
- Marcia S. Krieger (J.D. 1979), judge of the United States District Court for the District of Colorado
- Walker David Miller (LL.B. 1963), former judge for the United States District Court for the District of Colorado
- Edward Nottingham (J.D. 1972), former judge of the United States District Court for the District of Colorado
- William J. Rea (LL.B. 1949), former judge of the United States District Court for the Central District of California
- Regina M. Rodriguez (J.D. 1988), judge of the United States District Court for the District of Colorado
- Waldo Henry Rogers (LL.B. 1931), former judge of the United States District Court for the District of New Mexico
- Jacob Weinberger (LL.B. 1904), former judge of the United States District Court for the Southern District of California
- Robert Wherry, former judge of the United States Tax Court
- Fred M. Winner (LL.B. 1936), former judge of the United States District Court for the District of Colorado

=== State supreme court justices ===
- Michael L. Bender (J.D. 1967), former chief justice of the Colorado Supreme Court
- Nathan B. Coats (J.D. 1977), former chief justice of the Colorado Supreme Court
- Carol Ronning Kapsner (J.D. 1977), justice of the North Dakota Supreme Court
- Alex J. Martinez (J.D. 1976), former justice of the Colorado Supreme Court
- Luis Rovira (LL.B. 1950), former chief justice of the Colorado Supreme Court
- Felix L. Sparks (LL.B. 1947), former justice of the Colorado Supreme Court, U.S. Army brigadier general

== Law ==
=== Attorneys general ===
- Jason R. Dunn (J.D. 2001), former U.S. attorney for the District of Colorado
- Clara Ruth Mozzor (LL.B. 1915), first woman to serve as a U.S. assistant attorney general
- John Suthers (J.D. 1977), former attorney general of Colorado and mayor of Colorado Springs

== Literature and journalism ==
- Stephen Coonts (J.D. 1979), thriller and suspense novelist
- Vine Deloria, Jr. (J.D. 1970), Native American author, theologian, historian, and activist
- Manuel Ramos (J.D. 1973), novelist who also has taught Chicano literature courses at Metropolitan State University of Denver

== Politics ==
=== United States senators ===
- Gordon L. Allott (LL.B. 1929), former U.S. senator from Colorado
- Hank Brown (J.D. 1969), former U.S. senator from Colorado and former president of the University of Colorado and the University of Northern Colorado
- Cory Gardner (J.D. 2001), former U.S. senator from Colorado, former U.S. representative from Colorado
- Eugene Millikin (LL.B. 1913), former U.S. senator from Colorado

=== United States representatives ===
- Donald G. Brotzman (LL.B. 1949), former U.S. representative from Colorado
- John Chenoweth (LL.B. 1916), former U.S. representative from Colorado
- James Paul Johnson (LL.B. 1959), former U.S. representative from Colorado
- John H. Marsalis (LL.B. 1934), former U.S. representative from Colorado
- John J. McIntyre (LL.B. 1928), former U.S. representative from Wyoming, former justice of the Wyoming Supreme Court
- Joe Neguse (J.D. 2009), U.S. representative from Colorado
- Ed Perlmutter (J.D. 1978), U.S. representative from Colorado

=== Governors ===
- George Alfred Carlson (LL.B. 1904), former governor of Colorado
- Ralph Lawrence Carr (LL.B. 1912), former governor of Colorado
- William Lee Knous (LL.B. 1911), former governor of Colorado
- Bill Ritter (J.D. 1981), former governor of Colorado, former district attorney of Denver County
- Roy Romer (LL.B. 1952), former governor of Colorado

=== State officials ===
- Bernie Buescher (J.D. 1974), former secretary of state of Colorado
- Morgan Carroll (J.D. 2000), Colorado Democratic Party chair; former member of the Colorado Senate
- Crisanta Duran (J.D. 2005), former speaker of the Colorado House of Representatives
- Larry Jent (J.D. 1983), member of the Montana Senate
- Robert Lee Knous (J.D. 1970), former lieutenant governor of Colorado
- Jeanne Labuda (J.D. 1989), former member, Colorado House of Representatives
- Alice Madden (J.D. 1989), former member, majority leader Colorado House of Representatives
- Dan Pabon (J.D. 2005), member, Colorado House of Representatives
- Ellen Roberts (J.D. 1986), former member, Colorado Senate
- Brandon Shaffer (J.D. 2001), former president of the Colorado State Senate
- Pat Steadman (J.D. 1991), former member, Colorado Senate
- Sam T. Taylor, former member, Colorado Senate
- Albert J. Tomsic (J.D. 1951), former speaker of the Colorado House of Representatives
- Tom Van Norman (J.D. 1993), former member, South Dakota House of Representatives

=== Local officials ===
- Penfield Tate II (J.D. 1968), first African-American mayor of Boulder, Colorado

== Sports ==
- Elizabeth Bird (J.D. 2024), Olympic steeplechase runner and lawyer
- Fred Folsom (LL.B. 1899), former NCAA football coach
- Ellen Hart Peña (J.D. 1988), former world-class runner and lawyer
- Chris Rowley (J.D. 2024), former MLB pitcher and lawyer, first player to attend the United States Military Academy to make MLB
