= List of United States federal courthouses in Colorado =

Following is a list of current and former courthouses of the United States federal court system located in Colorado. Each entry indicates the name of the building along with an image, if available, its location and the jurisdiction it covers, the dates during which it was used for each such jurisdiction, and, if applicable the person for whom it was named, and the date of renaming. Dates of use will not necessarily correspond with the dates of construction or demolition of a building, as pre-existing structures may be adapted for court use, and former court buildings may later be put to other uses. Also, the official name of the building may be changed at some point after its use as a federal court building has been initiated.

== Courthouses ==
Courthouse	City	Image	Street address	Jurisdiction	First used	Last used	Notes
U.S. Post Office and Federal Courthouse†	Colorado Springs		201 East Pikes Peak Avenue	D. Col.	?	?	
U.S. Court House and Post Office	Denver		?	D. Col.	1892	1916	Razed in the early 1960s.
Alfred A. Arraj U.S. Courthouse	Denver		901 19th Street	D. Col.	?	present	Named after District Court judge Alfred A. Arraj.
U.S. Customhouse†	Denver		721 19th Street	D. Col.	1931	present	
Byron Rogers Federal Building and U.S. Courthouse†	Denver		1961 Stout Street	D. Col.	1965	present	Named after U.S. Rep. Byron G. Rogers in 1984.
Byron White U.S. Courthouse†	Denver		1823 Stout Street	10th Cir.	?	present	Named after Supreme Court Justice Byron White in 1994.
U.S. Post Office	Durango		1060 Main Avenue	D. Col.	1929	?	
Wayne N. Aspinall Federal Building†	Grand Junction		400 Rood Avenue	D. Col.	1918	present	Named after U.S. Rep. Wayne N. Aspinall in 1972.
Pueblo Federal Building†	Pueblo		421 North Main Street	D. Col.	1898	2002	
U.S. Post Office and Land Office†	Sterling		306 Poplar Street	D. Col.	1931	?	

== Key ==
^{†}	Listed on the National Register of Historic Places (NRHP)
^{††}	NRHP-listed and also designated as a National Historic Landmark
