= John Carbone Porfilio =

American judge (born 1934)

John Porfilio

Senior Judge of the United States Court of Appeals for the Tenth Circuit
- Incumbent
- Assumed office October 15, 1999

Judge of the United States Court of Appeals for the Tenth Circuit
- In office May 10, 1985 – October 15, 1999
- Appointed by: Ronald Reagan
- Preceded by: Robert Hugh McWilliams Jr.
- Succeeded by: Timothy Tymkovich

Judge of the United States District Court for the District of Colorado
- In office June 25, 1982 – May 13, 1985
- Appointed by: Ronald Reagan
- Preceded by: Fred M. Winner
- Succeeded by: Daniel B. Sparr

Personal details
- Born: John Carbone Porfilio; October 14, 1934 (age 90); Denver, Colorado, U.S.
- Education: University of Denver (BA, LLB)

John Carbone Porfilio (born October 14, 1934) is an inactive Senior United States circuit judge of the United States Court of Appeals for the Tenth Circuit and a former United States District Judge of the United States District Court for the District of Colorado.

== Education and career ==
Born John Carbone Porfilio in Denver, Colorado, his name was changed to John Porfilio Moore when his mother remarried and his step father adopted him. Porfilio received a Bachelor of Arts degree from the University of Denver in 1956 and a Bachelor of Laws from the University of Denver College of Law in 1959. He was in private practice in Denver from 1959 to 1962. He was an assistant state attorney general of Colorado from 1962 to 1968. He was the Deputy Attorney General of Colorado from 1968 to 1972 under Attorney General Duke Dunbar. In 1972, Dunbar died in office. Governor John Love appointed Moore to the position of Colorado Attorney General. He served as Colorado Attorney General from 1972 until 1975. In the 1974 general election, Democratic candidate and former state legislator J.D. MacFarlane defeated Moore for a full-term.

== Federal judicial service ==
On January 15, 1975, Chief Judge Alfred A. Arraj swore Moore into office as a United States Bankruptcy Judge of the District of Colorado, filling a long vacant position due to a rise in bankruptcy filings. He served in this position from 1975 to 1982. On May 18, 1982, Porfilio was nominated by President Ronald Reagan to a seat on the United States District Court for the District of Colorado vacated by Judge Fred M. Winner. Porfilio was confirmed by the United States Senate on June 24, 1982, and received his commission on June 25, 1982. Porfilio served in that capacity until May 13, 1985, due to elevation to the court of appeals.

On April 5, 1985, Reagan nominated Porfilio to a seat on the United States Court of Appeals for the Tenth Circuit vacated by Judge Robert Hugh McWilliams Jr. Porfilio was confirmed by the Senate on May 3, 1985, and received his commission on May 10, 1985. He assumed senior status on October 15, 1999. On January 8, 1996, Porfillio legally changed his name back to his birth name.

== Sources ==
Legal offices
Preceded by Fred M. Winner	Judge of the United States District Court for the District of Colorado; 1982–1985	Succeeded by Daniel B. Sparr
Preceded by Robert Hugh McWilliams Jr.	Judge of the United States Court of Appeals for the Tenth Circuit; 1985–1999	Succeeded by Timothy Tymkovich
