= Frances Olsen =

American legal scholar

Frances Elisabeth Olsen (born February 4, 1945) is an American legal scholar who is a professor of law at University of California, Los Angeles and a member of the school of Feminist Legal Theory. She teaches Feminist Legal Theory, dissidence and law, family law, and torts. Her areas of research interest include legal theory, social change, and feminism.

== Life and career ==
She was born in Chicago, Illinois, received a Bachelor of Arts from Goddard College in 1968, a Juris Doctor from the University of Colorado Law School in 1971 (where she was the Notes and Comments Editor of the law review), and an Doctor of Juridical Science from Harvard University in 1984. While in law school, Olsen did legal aid work for migrant farm workers in Colorado. After law school, she was a law clerk for Alfred A. Arraj, the Chief Judge of the United States District Court for the District of Colorado. In 1973, she represented Native Americans at Wounded Knee. She also established a public interest law firm in Denver, Colorado that handled feminist issues. From 1981 to 1983, while a Doctor of Juridical Science student, she founded a legal academic women's group, the Fem-Crits, which spread across the country.

She has written more than 100 scholarly articles, co-authored Cases and Materials on Family Law: Legal Concepts and Changing Human Relationships, and edited two collections on feminist theory. Her article The Family and the Market, 96 Harv. L. Rev. 1497 (1983), is one of the most cited works in legal scholarship. She has taught courses in feminist legal theory at Harvard, Oxford, Cambridge, Berlin, Frankfurt, the University of Tokyo, the Hebrew University of Jerusalem, and at other universities in the United States, Chile, France, Italy, Japan, and Israel. She was a Fellow at Oxford University in 1987 and is a former Overseas Fellow at Churchill College, Cambridge University. She has lectured throughout the world.
