= Edward Nottingham =

American judge (born 1948)

Edward Willis Nottingham Jr.

Chief Judge of the United States District Court for the District of Colorado
- In office 2007–2008
- Preceded by: Lewis Babcock
- Succeeded by: Wiley Young Daniel

Judge of the United States District Court for the District of Colorado
- In office November 27, 1989 – October 29, 2008
- Appointed by: George H. W. Bush
- Preceded by: Seat established by 98 Stat. 333
- Succeeded by: William J. Martínez

Personal details
- Born: Edward Willis Nottingham Jr. January 9, 1948 (age 78) Denver, Colorado, U.S.
- Education: Cornell University (AB); University of Colorado Law School (JD)

Edward Willis Nottingham Jr. (born January 9, 1948) is a former United States district judge of the United States District Court for the District of Colorado, having served in that office from November 24, 1989, until his resignation on October 21, 2008, after a year of scandal.

== Early life, education, and career ==
Born in Denver, Colorado, Nottingham was raised in Eagle County, Colorado. He received an Artium Baccalaureus degree from Cornell University in 1969, and a Juris Doctor from the University of Colorado Law School in 1972. Prior to his appointment as a judge, Nottingham was a local coordinator for Bush's 1988 presidential campaign. From 1972 to 1973, he was a law clerk of the United States District Court for the District of Colorado for Chief United States District Judge Alfred A. Arraj. Before becoming a judge, he spent a decade and a half in private practice in Grand Junction, Colorado, interrupted by a two-year stint as an Assistant United States Attorney for the District of Colorado from 1976 to 1978.

== Federal judicial service ==
Nottingham was nominated to the United States District Court for the District of Colorado by President George H. W. Bush on October 20, 1989, to a new seat created by 98 Stat. 333. After a brief delay brought on by Senate efforts to block some Bush appointees, Nottingham was confirmed on by the United States Senate on November 21, 1989, and received his commission on November 27, 1989.

During his nineteen-year tenure, Nottingham oversaw a number of high-profile cases, such as a copyright infringement case involving Michael Jackson, a ruling barring the State of Colorado from withholding public funds for abortion, a ruling invalidating a law creating a federal "no-call list" for telemarketers which was ultimately overturned, and the prosecution of former Qwest CEO Joe Nacchio for insider trading.

Although Nottingham's talent as a jurist was never in serious dispute, the consistency of his work and his judicial temperament were matters of widespread concern. On the one hand, The Denver Post reported that Nottingham had a reputation for judicial efficiency, and as "one of the best legal minds on the bench". He received both notoriety and admiration for dressing down witnesses, demanding professionalism from attorneys, and punishing lawyers who brought what he judged to be frivolous cases by scheduling them for hearings at 6 AM.

In August 2007, a complaint of judicial misconduct was filed against him with the Tenth Circuit and an investigation started that included two hearings over the course of a year; the complaint concerned allegations that he had spent thousands of dollars at a strip club. Over the course of the year, he was also named as a figure in an investigation into a prostitution ring, in which a prostitute said that he had asked her to mislead investigators. He resigned from the bench on October 21, 2008, and the misconduct charges were dismissed, as he was no longer a judge.

== Private law practice ==
After leaving the bench, Nottingham opened a private law practice in Colorado.

== Sources ==
- FJC Bio

Legal offices
Preceded by Seat established by 98 Stat. 333	Judge of the United States District Court for the District of Colorado; 1989–2008	Succeeded by William J. Martínez
Preceded by Lewis Babcock	Chief Judge of the United States District Court for the District of Colorado; 2007–2008	Succeeded by Wiley Young Daniel
