= Gordon Gallagher =

American judge (born 1970)

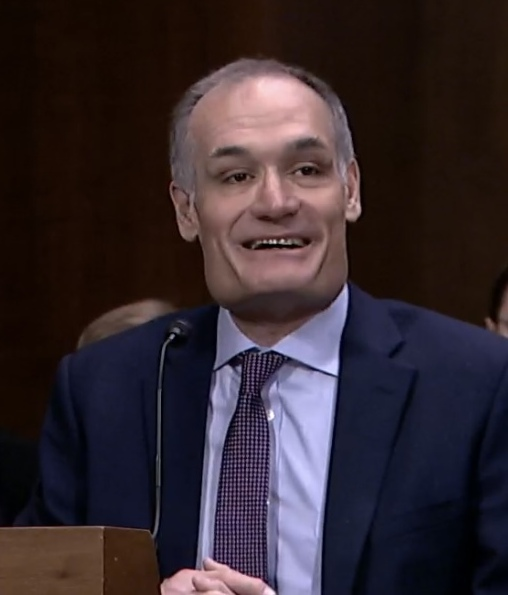

Judge of the United States District Court for the District of Colorado
- Incumbent
- Assumed office March 24, 2023
- Appointed by: Joe Biden
- Preceded by: William J. Martínez

Magistrate Judge of the United States District Court for the District of Colorado
- In office October 12, 2012 – March 24, 2023
- Succeeded by: Richard T. Gurley

Personal details
- Born: Gordon Paul Gallagher; 1970 (age 55–56) Louisville, Kentucky, U.S.
- Education: Macalester College (BA); University of Denver (JD)

Gordon Paul Gallagher (born 1970) is an American lawyer and jurist serving as a United States district judge of the United States District Court for the District of Colorado. He previously served as a United States magistrate judge of the same court.

== Education ==
Gallagher earned a Bachelor of Arts from Macalester College in 1991 and a Juris Doctor from the Sturm College of Law at the University of Denver in 1996.

== Career ==
Gallagher spent most of his career in the Colorado Western Slope region. From 1996 to 1997, Gallagher worked as an associate at Underhill and Underhill P.C., representing small businesses. From 1997 to 2000, he served as a deputy district attorney in the Mesa County District Attorney's Office. He operated his own solo practice from 2000 to 2023, focusing on criminal defense, and worked as a federal magistrate judge of the District of Colorado from October 12, 2012, to March 24, 2023, sitting in Grand Junction, Colorado. As a magistrate judge, he oversaw petty offense and misdemeanor cases on federal lands in the western part of the state.

From 2002 until his appointment as a magistrate judge in 2012, Gallagher was a contracted attorney with the Colorado's Office of the Alternate Defense Counsel, representing indigent defendants who could not be represented by the Office of the Colorado State Public Defender due to a conflict. Gallagher has also represented the Southern Ute Indian Tribe and Ute Mountain Ute Tribe. He has been a member of the District Court's Pro Se Working Group and the Grand Valley Task Force's Criminal Justice Working Group.

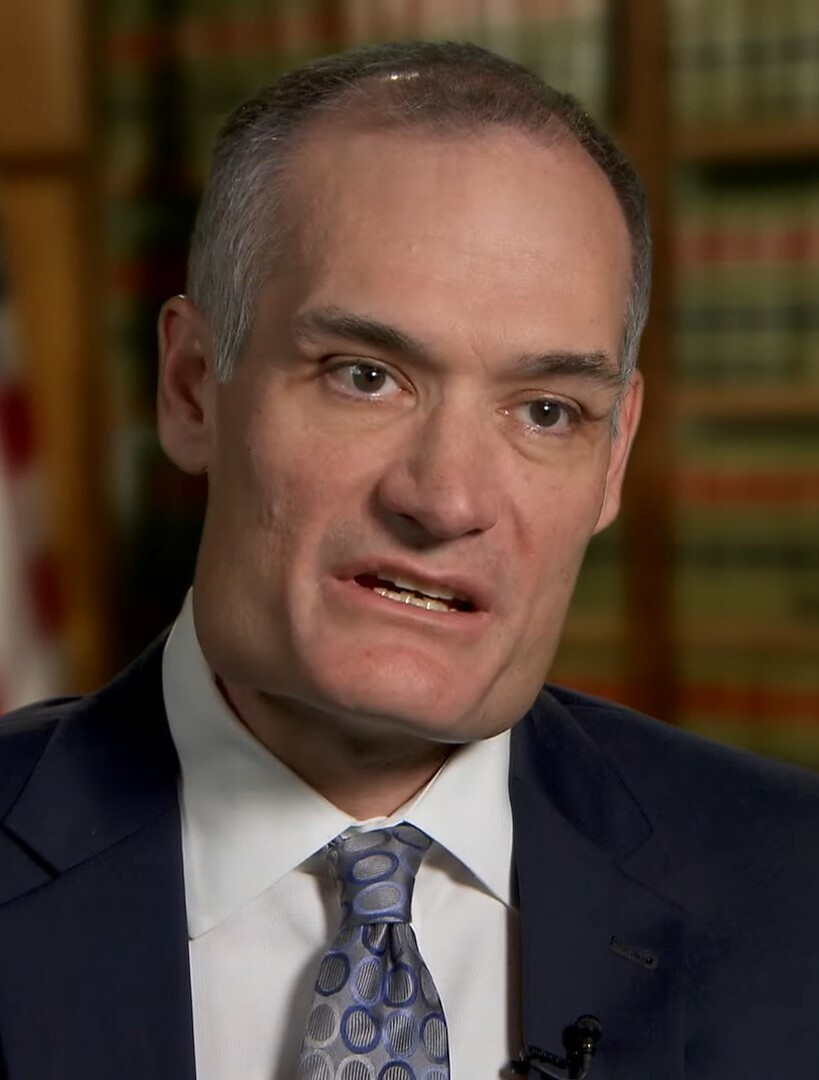
Gallagher in 2019

=== Federal judicial service ===
On August 2, 2022, U.S. senators Michael Bennet and John Hickenlooper recommended Gallagher, Sundeep Addy and Kato Crews for two vacancies on the U.S. District Court for the District of Colorado. On September 2, 2022, President Joe Biden announced his intent to nominate Gallagher to serve as a United States district judge of the United States District Court for the District of Colorado. On September 6, 2022, his nomination was sent to the Senate. President Biden nominated Gallagher to the seat vacated by Judge William J. Martínez, who subsequently assumed senior status on February 10, 2023. He was the first Colorado Western Slope resident to be appointed to a federal Article III judgeship since 1989. Gallagher was unanimously rated "well qualified" for the judgeship by the American Bar Association's Standing Committee on the Federal Judiciary.

On December 13, 2022, a hearing on his nomination was held before the Senate Judiciary Committee. On January 3, 2023, his nomination was returned to the President under Rule XXXI, Paragraph 6 of the United States Senate. He was renominated on January 23, 2023. On February 9, 2023, his nomination was reported out of committee by a 14–7 vote. On March 2, 2023, the Senate invoked cloture on his nomination by a 50–41 vote. On March 22, 2023, his nomination was confirmed by a 53–43 vote. He received his judicial commission on March 24, 2023.

Legal offices
Preceded by William J. Martínez	Judge of the United States District Court for the District of Colorado; 2023–present	Incumbent
