= Robert Hugh McWilliams Jr. =

American judge (1916–2013)

Senior Judge of the United States Court of Appeals for the Tenth Circuit
- In office August 31, 1984 – April 10, 2013

Judge of the United States Court of Appeals for the Tenth Circuit
- In office October 14, 1970 – August 31, 1984
- Appointed by: Richard Nixon
- Preceded by: Jean Sala Breitenstein
- Succeeded by: John Carbone Porfilio

Personal details
- Born: April 27, 1916 Salina, Kansas
- Died: April 10, 2013 (aged 96) Denver, Colorado
- Education: University of Denver (AB, LLB)

Robert Hugh McWilliams Jr. (April 27, 1916 – April 10, 2013) was a United States circuit judge of the United States Court of Appeals for the Tenth Circuit and a justice of the Colorado Supreme Court.

== Education and career ==
Born in Salina, Kansas, McWilliams graduated from South High School in Denver, then received an Artium Baccalaureus degree from the University of Denver in 1938 and a Bachelor of Laws from the Sturm College of Law at the University of Denver in 1941. From 1941 to 1942, he was deputy district attorney of Denver. In addition, McWilliams was a special agent of the Office of Naval Intelligence from 1942 to 1945. He was in the United States Army as a Sergeant in the Office of Strategic Services from 1945 to 1946. He was district attorney of Denver from 1946 to 1949. From 1949 to 1952, McWilliams was in private practice in Denver. He served as a judge of the Municipal Court in Denver from 1949 to 1952. From 1952 to 1961, he was a judge of the Second Judicial District in the City of Denver and Denver County. He served as a justice of the Supreme Court of Colorado from 1961 to 1970.

=== Federal judicial service ===
McWilliams was nominated by President Richard Nixon on September 22, 1970, to a seat on the United States Court of Appeals for the Tenth Circuit vacated by Judge Jean Sala Breitenstein. He was confirmed by the United States Senate on October 8, 1970, and received his commission on October 14, 1970. He assumed senior status on August 31, 1984, and took inactive senior status in 2011. His service terminated on April 10, 2013, due to his death in Denver, seventeen days shy of his 97th birthday.

== See also ==
- List of United States federal judges by longevity of service

== Sources ==
- Political Graveyard

Legal offices
Preceded by Jean Sala Breitenstein	Judge of the United States Court of Appeals for the Tenth Circuit; 1970–1984	Succeeded by John Carbone Porfilio
