= Daniel B. Sparr =

American judge (1931–2006)

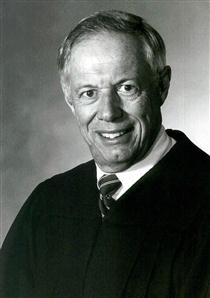

Senior Judge of the United States District Court for the District of Colorado
- In office May 1, 2001 – November 9, 2006

Judge of the United States District Court for the District of Colorado
- In office April 6, 1990 – May 1, 2001
- Appointed by: George H. W. Bush
- Preceded by: John Carbone Porfilio
- Succeeded by: Marcia S. Krieger

Personal details
- Born: Daniel B. Sparr; June 8, 1931 Denver, Colorado
- Died: November 9, 2006 (aged 75)
- Education: University of Denver (BS); University of Denver College of Law (JD)

Daniel B. Sparr (June 8, 1931 – November 9, 2006) was a United States district judge of the United States District Court for the District of Colorado.

== Education and career ==
Born in Denver, Colorado, Sparr received a Bachelor of Science degree in business administration from the University of Denver in 1952. He was a captain in the United States Air Force from 1950 to 1955 and was stationed at Edwards Air Force Base in California and Hill Air Force Base in Utah. He received a Juris Doctor from the University of Denver College of Law in 1966. He was in private practice in Denver from 1966 to 1970, and working in the Office of General Counsel for Mountain States Telephone & Telegraph Co., in Denver, from 1970 to 1971. He returned to private practice in Denver from 1971 to 1974, then in Lakewood, Colorado from 1974 to 1975, and again in Denver from 1975 to 1977. He was a judge on the Second Judicial District Court of Colorado from 1977 to 1990.

== Federal judicial service ==
On January 24, 1990, Sparr was nominated by President George H. W. Bush to a seat on the United States District Court for the District of Colorado vacated by Judge John Carbone Porfilio. Sparr was confirmed by the United States Senate on April 5, 1990, and received his commission on April 6, 1990. He assumed senior status on May 1, 2001. Sparr served in that capacity until his death, on November 9, 2006.

== Sources ==
- FJC Bio

Legal offices
Preceded by John Carbone Porfilio	Judge of the United States District Court for the District of Colorado; 1990–2001	Succeeded by Marcia S. Krieger
