= Sherman Glenn Finesilver =

American judge (1927–2006)

Senior Judge of the United States District Court for the District of Colorado
- In office May 31, 1994 – December 31, 1994

Chief Judge of the United States District Court for the District of Colorado
- In office 1982–1994
- Preceded by: Fred M. Winner
- Succeeded by: Richard Paul Matsch

Judge of the United States District Court for the District of Colorado
- In office September 22, 1971 – May 31, 1994
- Appointed by: Richard Nixon
- Preceded by: William Edward Doyle
- Succeeded by: Wiley Young Daniel

Personal details
- Born: Sherman Glenn Finesilver; October 1, 1927 Denver, Colorado, U.S.
- Died: October 12, 2006 (aged 79) Denver, Colorado, U.S.
- Education: University of Colorado Boulder (B.A.); Sturm College of Law (J.D.)

Sherman Glenn Finesilver (October 1, 1927 – October 12, 2006) was a United States district judge of the United States District Court for the District of Colorado.

== Education and career ==
Born in Denver, Colorado, Finesilver received a Bachelor of Arts degree from the University of Colorado Boulder in 1949 and a Juris Doctor from the Sturm College of Law at the University of Denver in 1952. He was in private practice in Denver from 1952 to 1955, and was also an assistant city attorney during that time. He was a judge of the County Court for the City and County of Denver from 1955 to 1962, and of the Colorado Second Judicial District from 1962 to 1971.

== Federal judicial service ==
On September 8, 1971, Finesilver was nominated by President Richard Nixon to a seat on the United States District Court for the District of Colorado vacated by Judge William Edward Doyle. Finesilver was confirmed by the United States Senate on September 21, 1971, and received his commission on September 22, 1971. He served as Chief Judge from 1982 to 1994, assuming senior status on May 31, 1994, and then retiring from the bench entirely on December 31, 1994.

== Notable Cases ==
Rocky Flats criminal investigation - As Chief Judge of the United States District Court for the District of Colorado, Finesilver presided over proceedings arising from the federal criminal investigation of environmental violations at the Rocky Flats Plant. In 1992, he accepted Rockwell International's plea agreement under which the company pleaded guilty to five felony and five misdemeanor environmental offenses and paid an $18.5 million fine. He also declined to release the special grand jury's report, finding that many of its factual allegations were unsupported by the evidence and that publication would be inappropriate.

== Post-judicial service ==
Following his retirement, Finesilver resumed private practice in Denver until his death on October 12, 2006, in Denver.

== See also ==
- List of Jewish American jurists

== Sources ==
Legal offices
Preceded by William Edward Doyle	Judge of the United States District Court for the District of Colorado; 1971–1994	Succeeded by Wiley Young Daniel
Preceded by Fred M. Winner	Chief Judge of the United States District Court for the District of Colorado; 1982–1994	Succeeded by Richard Paul Matsch
