= Daniel D. Domenico =

American judge (born 1972)

Daniel Domenico

Judge of the United States Court of Appeals for the Tenth Circuit
- Designate
- Assuming office TBD
- Appointed by: Donald Trump
- Succeeding: Timothy Tymkovich

Chief Judge of the United States District Court for the District of Colorado
- In office March 4, 2026 – October 1, 2026
- Preceded by: Philip A. Brimmer
- Succeeded by: Regina M. Rodriguez

Judge of the United States District Court for the District of Colorado
- Incumbent
- Assumed office May 7, 2019
- Appointed by: Donald Trump
- Preceded by: Robert E. Blackburn

Solicitor General of Colorado
- In office 2006–2015
- Governor: Bill Owens; Bill Ritter; John Hickenlooper
- Preceded by: Allison H. Eid
- Succeeded by: Frederick Yarger

Personal details
- Born: Daniel Desmond Domenico; 1972 (age 53–54) Boulder, Colorado, U.S.
- Education: Georgetown University (BA); University of Virginia (JD)

Daniel Desmond Domenico (born 1972) is a United States district judge of the United States District Court for the District of Colorado and a United States circuit judge - designate of the United States Court of Appeals for the Tenth Circuit.

== Biography ==
Domenico earned his Bachelor of Arts, magna cum laude, from Georgetown University, and his Juris Doctor from the University of Virginia School of Law, where he was inducted into the Order of the Coif and served as an editor of the Virginia Law Review.

After graduating from law school, he was an associate at Hogan & Hartson from 2000 to 2003 and then served as a law clerk for Judge Timothy Tymkovich of the United States Court of Appeals for the Tenth Circuit from 2003 to 2004.

In 2004, Domenico was counsel to John Thune's ultimately successful campaign for U.S. Senate.

From 2006 to 2015, he served as the Solicitor General of Colorado, where he oversaw major litigation for the state and represented governors from both the Democratic Party and Republican Party. During his tenure as Solicitor General, he argued in state and federal courts, including the Supreme Court of the United States, and received the Supreme Court Best Brief Award from the National Association of Attorneys General. At the time of his appointment, he was the youngest state solicitor general in the country, and his nine years of service made him the longest serving solicitor general in Colorado history. He has also served as an adjunct professor of natural resources and advanced constitutional law at the Sturm College of Law. From 2015 to 2019, Domenico served as principal of Kittredge, LLC.

In early 2017, President Donald Trump appointed Neil Gorsuch to the Supreme Court of the United States. Trump considered nominating Domenico to succeed Gorsuch on the United States Court of Appeals for the Tenth Circuit, but ultimately chose Colorado Supreme Court Justice Allison H. Eid, who was successfully confirmed.

== Federal judicial service ==
=== District Court service ===
On September 28, 2017, President Donald Trump announced his intent to nominate Domenico to an undetermined seat on the United States District Court for the District of Colorado. On October 2, 2017, he was officially nominated to the seat vacated by Judge Robert E. Blackburn, who assumed senior status on April 12, 2016.

On January 3, 2018, his nomination was returned to the President under Rule XXXI, Paragraph 6 of the United States Senate. On January 5, 2018, President Donald Trump announced his intent to renominate Domenico to a federal judgeship. On January 8, 2018, his renomination was sent to the Senate. On January 24, 2018, a hearing on his nomination was held before the Senate Judiciary Committee. On February 15, Domenico's nomination was reported out of committee by an 11–10 vote.

On January 3, 2019, his nomination was returned to the President under Rule XXXI, Paragraph 6 of the United States Senate. On January 23, 2019, President Trump announced his intent to renominate him for a federal judgeship. His nomination was sent to the Senate later that day. On February 7, 2019, his nomination was reported out of committee by a 12–10 vote. On April 9, 2019, the Senate invoked cloture on his nomination by a 55–42 vote. Later that day, his nomination was confirmed by a 57–42 vote. He received his judicial commission on May 7, 2019. He became chief judge on March 4, 2026.

=== Court of Appeals nomination ===
On May 11, 2026, President Trump announced his intention to nominate Domenico to the United States Court of Appeals for the Tenth Circuit, to an undesignated seat. On May 12, 2026, Trump nominated Domenico to the Tenth Circuit, to the seat being vacated by Judge Timothy Tymkovich. On June 24, 2026, he had his confirmation hearing before the Senate Judiciary Committee. On July 23, 2026, his nomination was reported to the full Senate by a 12-10 vote. The full Senate confirmed him by a party-line 51-46 vote on November 16, 2026.

=== Notable rulings ===
In April 2023, Domenico temporarily exempted a Catholic anti-abortion clinic from Colorado's Senate Bill 190. On April 14, 2023, Colorado Governor Jared Polis signed three bills further protecting access to abortion and gender-affirming care into law. Bella Health and Wellness, a nonprofit religious liberty law firm, filed a lawsuit asking that enforcement of the measure be temporarily halted because the legislation violated their constitutional free speech and equal protection rights.

== Memberships ==
He has been an intermittent member of the Federalist Society since 2000.

Legal offices
Preceded by Allison H. Eid	Solicitor General of Colorado; 2006–2015	Succeeded by Frederick Yarger
Preceded by Robert E. Blackburn	Judge of the United States District Court for the District of Colorado; 2019–present	Incumbent
Preceded by Philip A. Brimmer	Chief Judge of the United States District Court for the District of Colorado; 2026	Succeeded by Regina M. Rodriguez
