= Regina M. Rodriguez =

American judge (born 1963)

Regina Rodriguez
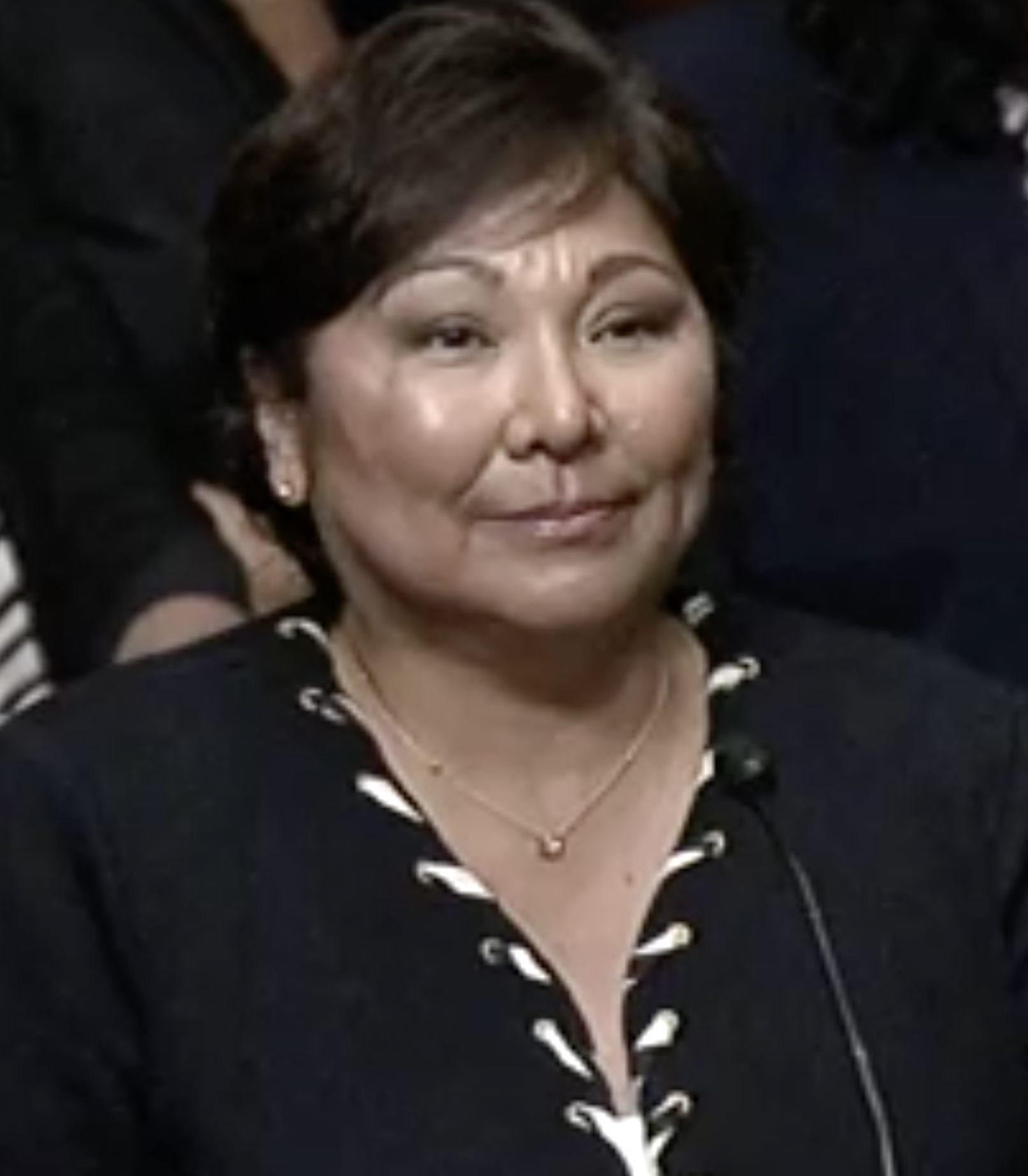

Chief Judge of the United States District Court for the District of Colorado
- Incumbent
- Assumed office October 1, 2026
- Preceded by: Daniel D. Domenico

Judge of the United States District Court for the District of Colorado
- Incumbent
- Assumed office July 1, 2021
- Appointed by: Joe Biden
- Preceded by: Marcia S. Krieger

Personal details
- Born: 1963 (age 62–63) Gunnison, Colorado, U.S.
- Education: University of Iowa (BS); University of Colorado, Boulder (JD)

Regina Marie Rodriguez (born 1963) is the chief United States district judge of the United States District Court for the District of Colorado.

== Early life and education ==
Rodriguez was born in 1963 in Gunnison, Colorado, to a Mexican-American father and Japanese-American mother. Her late father, Pete Rodriguez, played football for Western State Colorado University and went on to serve as an assistant coach in the National Football League, which made him one of the league's first Hispanic coaches.

Rodriguez received a Bachelor of Science from the University of Iowa in 1985 and a Juris Doctor from the University of Colorado School of Law in 1988.

== Career ==
Rodriguez began her legal career as an associate in the law firm of Cooper & Kelly, P.C. (now defunct) from 1988 to 1995. She served as an assistant United States attorney for the United States Attorney's Office for the District of Colorado from 1995 to 2002, during which time she served as the deputy chief of the Civil Division from 1998 to 1999 and as chief of the civil division from 1999 to 2002. In addition, from 1997 to 1998, she served a four-month detail as deputy senior counsel for alternative dispute resolution in the United States Department of Justice. Previously, from 2002 to 2016, she worked in the Denver office of Faegre & Benson LLP (now Faegre Baker Daniels LLP) as a special counsel until she was elevated to partner in 2005. She was a partner in the Denver office of Hogan Lovells from 2016 to 2019, where she specialized in mass tort and product liability defense. She was a partner at WilmerHale from 2019 until she was commissioned as a federal judge.

== Federal judicial service ==
=== Expired nomination to district court under Obama ===
On April 28, 2016, President Barack Obama nominated Rodriguez to serve as a United States district judge of the United States District Court of the District of Colorado, to the seat vacated by Judge Robert E. Blackburn, who assumed senior status on April 12, 2016. Her nomination expired on January 3, 2017, with the end of the 114th Congress.

=== Renomination to district court under Biden ===
On March 30, 2021, President Joe Biden announced his intent to nominate Rodriguez to serve as a United States district judge of the United States District Court for the District of Colorado. On April 19, 2021, her nomination was sent to the Senate. President Biden nominated Rodriguez to the seat vacated by Judge Marcia S. Krieger, who assumed senior status on March 3, 2019. On April 28, 2021, a hearing was held on her nomination before the Senate Judiciary Committee. On May 20, 2021, her nomination was reported out of committee by a 17–5 vote. On June 8, 2021, the United States Senate invoked cloture on her nomination by a 72–28 vote. She was confirmed later that day by a 72–28 vote. She received her judicial commission on July 1, 2021. She became the chief judge on October 1, 2026

== See also ==
- List of Asian American jurists
- List of Hispanic and Latino American jurists

Legal offices
Preceded by Marcia S. Krieger	Judge of the United States District Court for the District of Colorado; 2021–present	Incumbent
Preceded by Daniel D. Domenico	Chief Judge of the United States District Court for the District of Colorado; 2026–present	Incumbent
