= David M. Ebel =

American judge (born 1940)

David Ebel

Senior Judge of the United States Court of Appeals for the Tenth Circuit
- Incumbent
- Assumed office January 16, 2006

Judge of the United States Court of Appeals for the Tenth Circuit
- In office April 20, 1988 – January 16, 2006
- Appointed by: Ronald Reagan
- Preceded by: William Edward Doyle
- Succeeded by: Neil Gorsuch

Personal details
- Born: David Milton Ebel; June 3, 1940 (age 86) Wichita, Kansas, U.S.
- Education: Northwestern University (BA); University of Michigan (JD)

David Milton Ebel (born June 3, 1940) is a senior United States circuit judge of the United States Court of Appeals for the Tenth Circuit.

== Education and career ==
Born in Wichita, Kansas, Ebel received a Bachelor of Arts degree from Northwestern University in 1962 and a Juris Doctor from the University of Michigan Law School in 1965, where he graduated first in his class and served as editor-in-chief of the Michigan Law Review. After law school he clerked for Justice Byron White of the United States Supreme Court from 1965 to 1966. He was in private practice in Denver, Colorado, from 1966 to 1988 at the firm of Davis Graham & Stubbs. He was an adjunct professor of law at the University of Denver Law School from 1987 to 1989 and a senior lecturing fellow at Duke University Law School from 1992 to 1994.

== Federal judicial service ==
Ebel was nominated by President Ronald Reagan on December 18, 1987, to a seat on the United States Court of Appeals for the Tenth Circuit vacated by Judge William Edward Doyle. Ebel was confirmed by the United States Senate on April 19, 1988, and received his commission on April 20, 1988. He assumed senior status on January 16, 2006. His seat was subsequently filled by Neil Gorsuch, nominated by President George W. Bush on May 10, 2006, who had also clerked for Justice Byron White.

During his tenure Ebel served seven years on the Judicial Conference Code of Conduct Committee, presiding over the consolidation of several separate employee codes into the unified Code of Conduct for Judicial Employees, applicable to nearly all federal judicial employees. He served as the presiding judge on the panel that heard the appeal of Timothy McVeigh, the Oklahoma City bombing perpetrator, in 1998.

== International judicial work ==
Ebel contributed to judicial reform efforts in Rwanda following that country's 1994 genocide, working through the American Bar Association's Africa program. He subsequently returned to Rwanda at the invitation of Tharcisse Karugarama, then vice-Chief Justice of the Rwandan Supreme Court, to assist in redesigning the country's judicial system, including converting its legal framework from a civil law to a common law system and establishing new court structures and appellate processes.

== See also ==
- List of law clerks for the sixth seat of the Supreme Court of the United States

Legal offices
Preceded by William Edward Doyle	Judge of the United States Court of Appeals for the Tenth Circuit; 1988–2006	Succeeded by Neil Gorsuch
