= Kato Crews =

American judge (born 1975)

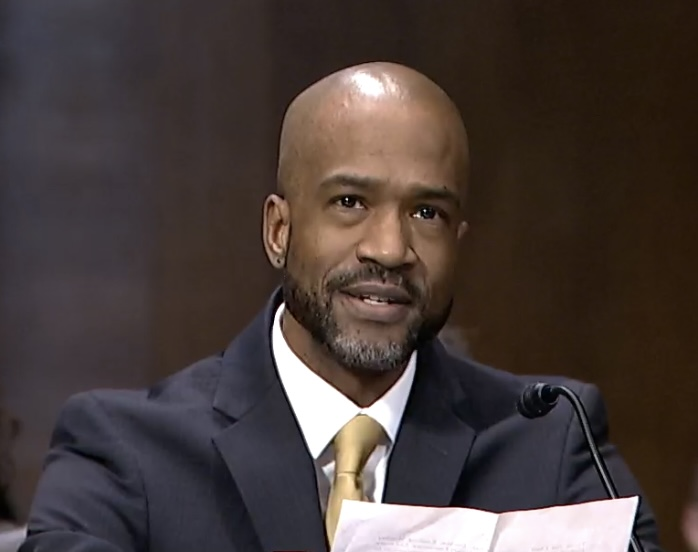

Judge of the United States District Court for the District of Colorado
- Incumbent
- Assumed office January 12, 2024
- Appointed by: Joe Biden
- Preceded by: Raymond P. Moore

Magistrate Judge of the United States District Court for the District of Colorado
- In office August 3, 2018 – January 12, 2024
- Succeeded by: Timothy P. O'Hara

Personal details
- Born: Shane Kato Crews; 1975 (age 49–50); Pueblo, Colorado, U.S.
- Education: University of Northern Colorado (BA); University of Arizona (JD)

Shane Kato Crews (born 1975) is an American lawyer and jurist who has served as a United States district judge of the United States District Court for the District of Colorado since 2024. He previously served as a United States magistrate judge of the same court from 2018 to 2024.

== Early life and education ==
Crews is a native of Pueblo, Colorado. He attended Rye High School in Rye, Colorado. He earned a Bachelor of Arts degree from the University of Northern Colorado in 1997 and a Juris Doctor from the University of Arizona in 2000, where he served on the Arizona Law Review.

== Career ==
In 2000 and 2001, Crews served as a staff attorney for the National Labor Relations Board in Denver. He later worked as a lawyer at Rothgerber Johnson & Lyons LLP in Denver from 2001 to 2008, becoming partner from 2008 to 2010. He worked at Mastin Hoffman & Crews LLC from 2011 to 2013, and Hoffman Crews Nies Waggener & Foster LLP from 2013 to 2018. In private practice, Crews focused on labor, business, and real estate law. He served as a magistrate judge of the United States District Court for the District of Colorado from August 3, 2018 to January 2024. He was the court's first African-American magistrate judge.

=== Federal judicial service ===
On April 29, 2022, U.S. Senators Michael Bennet and John Hickenlooper recommended Sundeep Addy, Gordon Gallagher and Crews for two vacancies on the United States District Court for the District of Colorado. On February 22, 2023, President Joe Biden announced his intent to nominate Crews to serve as a United States district judge of the United States District Court for the District of Colorado.

On February 27, 2023, his nomination was sent to the Senate. President Biden nominated Crews to a seat being vacated by Judge Raymond P. Moore, who subsequently assumed senior status on June 20, 2023. Crews was the third magistrate judge to be nominated for a district court vacancy in Colorado.

On March 22, 2023, a hearing on his nomination was held before the Senate Judiciary Committee. During his confirmation hearing, he was unable to answer a question by Senator John Kennedy, in which the senator asked him to define a Brady motion, which is a tenet of criminal law.

On May 11, 2023, his nomination was reported out of committee by a party line 11–10 vote. On January 10, 2024, the United States Senate invoked cloture on his nomination by a 51–47 vote, with Senator Kyrsten Sinema voting against the motion to invoke cloture on his nomination. Later that day, his nomination was confirmed by a 51–48 vote, with Senator Sinema voting against his confirmation. He received his judicial commission on January 12, 2024.

== See also ==
- Joe Biden judicial appointment controversies
- List of African American federal judges
- List of African American jurists

Legal offices
Preceded by Raymond P. Moore	Judge of the United States District Court for the District of Colorado; 2024–present	Incumbent
