= United States Customhouse (Denver) =

- U.S. Customhouse
- U.S. National Register of Historic Places
- Colorado State Register of Historic Properties
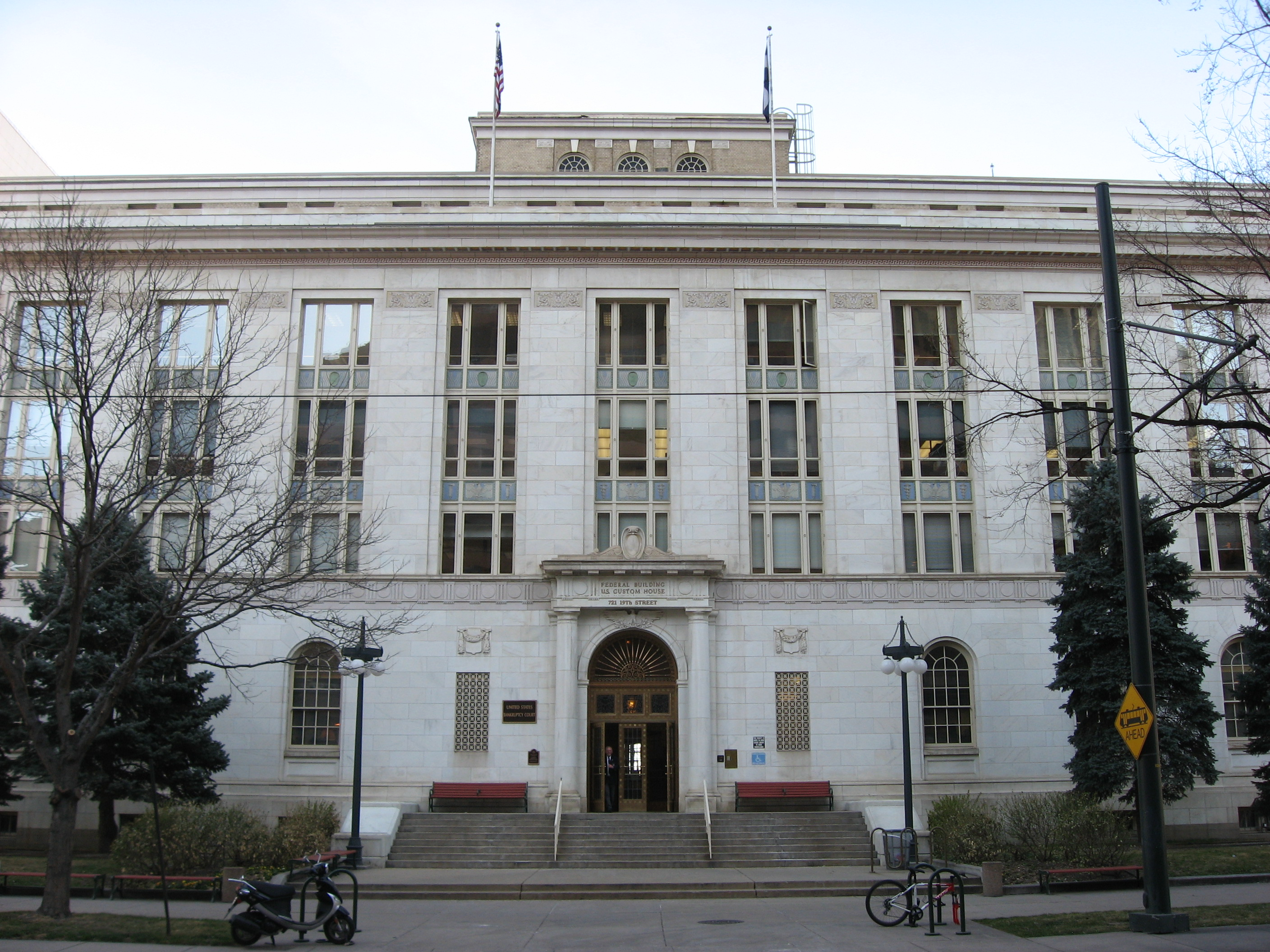
- U.S. Customhouse, March 2009

- Location within Colorado Location within the United States
- Location: 721 19th St., Denver, Colorado
- Coordinates: 39°44′55″N 104°59′18″W
- Area: 2.4 acres (0.97 ha)
- Built: 1931
- Architect: Wetmore, James; Buell, Temple H.
- Architectural style: Renaissance, Italian Renaissance Revival
- NRHP reference No.: 79000594
- CSRHP No.: 5DV.153
- Added to NRHP: October 16, 1979

The Federal Building and United States Custom House, Denver, Colorado is a historic courthouse and federal office building located at Denver, Colorado. It is a courthouse for the United States District Court for the District of Colorado.

== History ==
The Federal Building and U.S. Custom House is part of a complex of four federal buildings located in close proximity to each other in downtown Denver, the others being the Byron G. Rogers Federal Building and U.S. Courthouse, the Byron White U.S. Courthouse, and the Alfred A. Arraj U.S. Courthouse.

The federal government acquired the site, which was previously home to the East Denver High School, in three parcels between 1928 and 1930 for just under $300,000. The building replaced Denver's overcrowded 1892 custom house, located at another location in the city.

Designs for the original portion of the building, completed in 1931, came from the Office of the Supervising Architect of the U.S. Treasury, which at that time was led by James A. Wetmore. Both this building and the nearby Byron White U.S. Courthouse are clad in the same Colorado Yule marble used in the Lincoln Memorial and the Tomb of the Unknown Soldier in Washington, D.C. Indiana limestone was originally planned for cladding the building, and would have been less expensive. However, members of Congress from Colorado successfully argued for use of local materials. The building was completed in May 1931 at a total cost of $1,260,000.

A 1937 addition nearly doubled the size of the building. Denver architects Temple Hoyne Buell and G. Meredith Musick designed the addition. The cladding material was once again controversial. In this case, Colorado Yule marble was substituted for Georgia marble after local officials successfully argued that the materials of the original building and addition should match, and that the revenue from the marble purchase should benefit Colorado.

Though it housed various federal agencies, the building's primary occupant was the U.S. Customs Service. Its revenues averaged $500,000 per year, and eventually climbed to $1,400,000 in 1957. In need of more space, the Customs Service moved to the former Stapleton Airport in 1957. The major building tenant is now the bankruptcy court. The building has been listed in the National Register of Historic Places since 1979.

During the 1960s and 1970s, protesters often used the U.S. Courthouse plaza across the street. In 1975, a bomb exploded in a first floor men's room of the building, but there was no significant structural damage. A group calling themselves the Continental Revolutionary Army took credit for the bombing.

== Architecture ==
The five-story Federal Building and U.S. Custom House is a skillfully executed example of Second Renaissance Revival architecture. The arched first floor window and door openings, detailed cornices, emphasis on the horizontal elements, and stately overall appearance of the building are all characteristic of this architectural style. It has a steel frame on poured concrete footings and a flat composite roof. The base is clad in granite, as are the stairs leading to the entry doors. The remainder of the Nineteenth, Stout, and California street elevations of the building are clad in smooth-rubbed, coarse cut Colorado Yule marble with terra-cotta ornamentation. The fifth floor, which is recessed eight feet, is clad in brick, as are the courtyard-facing elevations of the building.

Marble quoins (cornerstones) highlight the transition from marble to brick facade. Terracotta is used for a belt course above the first floor, cornices, and spandrels between the windows of the second and third, and third and fourth stories. Decorative terra cotta swags are located above the ornamental grillwork that flanks the main entry door. The symmetrical plan is E-shaped with a semi-enclosed courtyard at the north end. The windows are spaced evenly and are designed to create a balanced overall look for the building. The tops of the first floor windows and the main entry doorway are arched. Spandrels that separate the second, third, and fourth story windows feature eagles and shields, emphasizing the federal use of the building. The primary entrance is on Nineteenth Street at the midpoint of the south elevation, and a penthouse is located above this central point that rises twenty feet above the parapet coping (decorative capping at the top of the wall).

The centered main entry is the focal point of the exterior. In 1972, the original bronze entry doors were removed and replaced with aluminum doors. A terracotta eagle tops a semicircular fanlight above the doorway. Tuscan order columns flanking the entrance support an entablature inscribed with the name of the building and capped by a decorative cartouche.

In the lobby, polished Colorado Yule marble surrounds the doors leading from the vestibule and clads the lower portion of the walls on either side of those doors. It also surrounds the elevators and extends for several feet on either side of the elevators, covering the lower portion of the walls. Only one of the light fixtures, which have oval etched-glass domes suspended within brass frameworks and hanging from the ceiling via brass chains, is original; the others were replicated. The bronze and leaded glass doors between the vestibule and the lobby were recently restored. Glass panes allow light to flood the lobby and the bronze surrounds and details reinforce the stately appearance of the building. There are staircases with marble treads at each end of the corridors leading off of the lobby. The layout of each floor of the building is identical, with offices lining each corridor. The wainscoting and baseboards are all marble, as are the bathroom partitions in the 1931 portion of the building.

The 1937 addition resulted in extensions to each side of the building that nearly doubled the area and made the central courtyard less visible from the street. Additional penthouses were added at the California and Stout Street ends of the building to house the upper portions of the elevator shafts. The corridors and lobby areas are largely intact, though the offices were modified.

== Building facts ==
- Location: 721 Nineteenth Street
- Architects: James A. Wetmore; Temple H. Buell with G. Meredith Musick
- Construction Dates: 1930–1931; 1937
- Architectural Style: Second Renaissance Revival
- Landmark Status: Listed in the National Register of Historic Places
- Primary Materials: Granite, marble, and brick
- Prominent Features: Classical marble and terracotta facade; Bronze-framed double entry doors; Marble wainscoting, oak doors and trim

== See also ==
- Yule marble
- National Register of Historic Places listings in Denver
