= Raymond P. Moore =

American judge (born 1953)

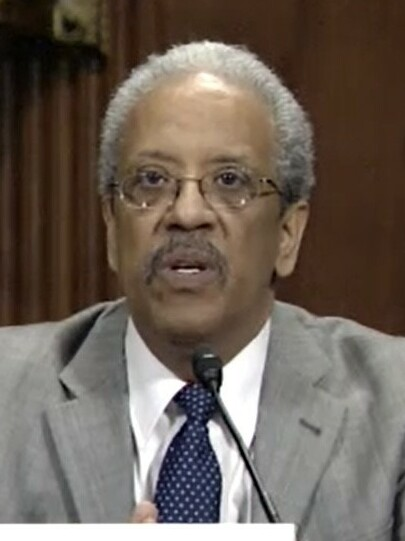
- Moore in 2013

Senior Judge of the United States District Court for the District of Colorado
- Incumbent
- Assumed office June 20, 2023

Judge of the United States District Court for the District of Colorado
- In office March 26, 2013 – June 20, 2023
- Appointed by: Barack Obama
- Preceded by: Wiley Young Daniel
- Succeeded by: Kato Crews

Personal details
- Born: June 19, 1953 (age 72) Boston, Massachusetts, U.S.
- Education: Yale University (BA, JD)

Raymond Paul Moore (born June 19, 1953) is a Senior United States district judge of the United States District Court for the District of Colorado.

== Biography ==
Moore was born in 1953 in Boston. He received his Bachelor of Arts, cum laude, in 1975 from Yale College. He received his Juris Doctor in 1978 from Yale Law School. He served as an associate at Davis, Graham & Stubbs from 1978 to 1982. From 1982 to 1986, he served as an assistant United States attorney in the District of Colorado. He returned to Davis, Graham & Stubbs in 1986 and became a partner in 1987. He served as an Assistant Federal Public Defender in Colorado from 1993 to 2003. In January 2004, he became the Federal Public Defender for the Districts of Colorado and Wyoming, serving until 2013.

=== Federal judicial service ===
On November 14, 2012, President Barack Obama nominated Moore to serve as a United States district judge of the United States District Court for the District of Colorado, to the seat being vacated by Judge Wiley Young Daniel, who took senior status, effective January 1, 2013. On January 3, 2013, his nomination was returned to the President, due to the sine die adjournment of the Senate. On January 3, 2013, he was renominated to the same office. His nomination was reported by the Senate Judiciary Committee on February 14, 2013, by voice vote. He was confirmed by voice vote on the legislative day of March 22, 2013. He received his commission on March 26, 2013. He assumed senior status on June 20, 2023.

== See also ==
- List of African-American federal judges
- List of African-American jurists

Legal offices
Preceded by Wiley Young Daniel	Judge of the United States District Court for the District of Colorado; 2013–2023	Succeeded by Kato Crews
