= List of federal judges appointed by Richard Nixon =

Following is a list of all Article III United States federal judges appointed by President Richard Nixon during his presidency. In total Nixon appointed 235 Article III federal judges, surpassing the previous record of 193 set by Franklin D. Roosevelt. Among these were 4 Justices to the Supreme Court of the United States (including 1 Chief Justice), 45 judges to the United States Courts of Appeals, 179 judges to the United States district courts, 3 judges to the United States Court of Customs and Patent Appeals, 3 judges to the United States Court of Claims and 1 judge to the United States Customs Court.

None of Nixon's appointees remain in active service, however 2 appellate judges remain on senior status. Two additional district judges appointed by Nixon are in senior status as appellate judges by the appointment of later presidents.

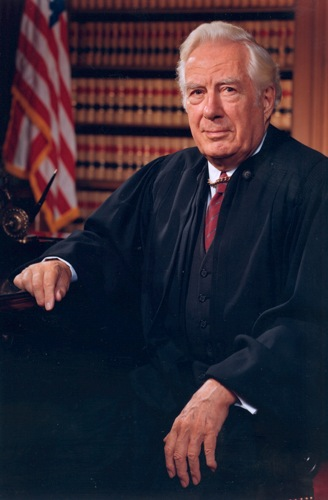
Warren E. Burger was Nixon's pick for Chief Justice.

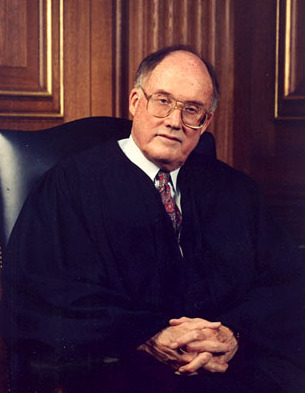
Nixon named William Rehnquist to the Supreme Court, enabling his later elevation to Chief Justice.

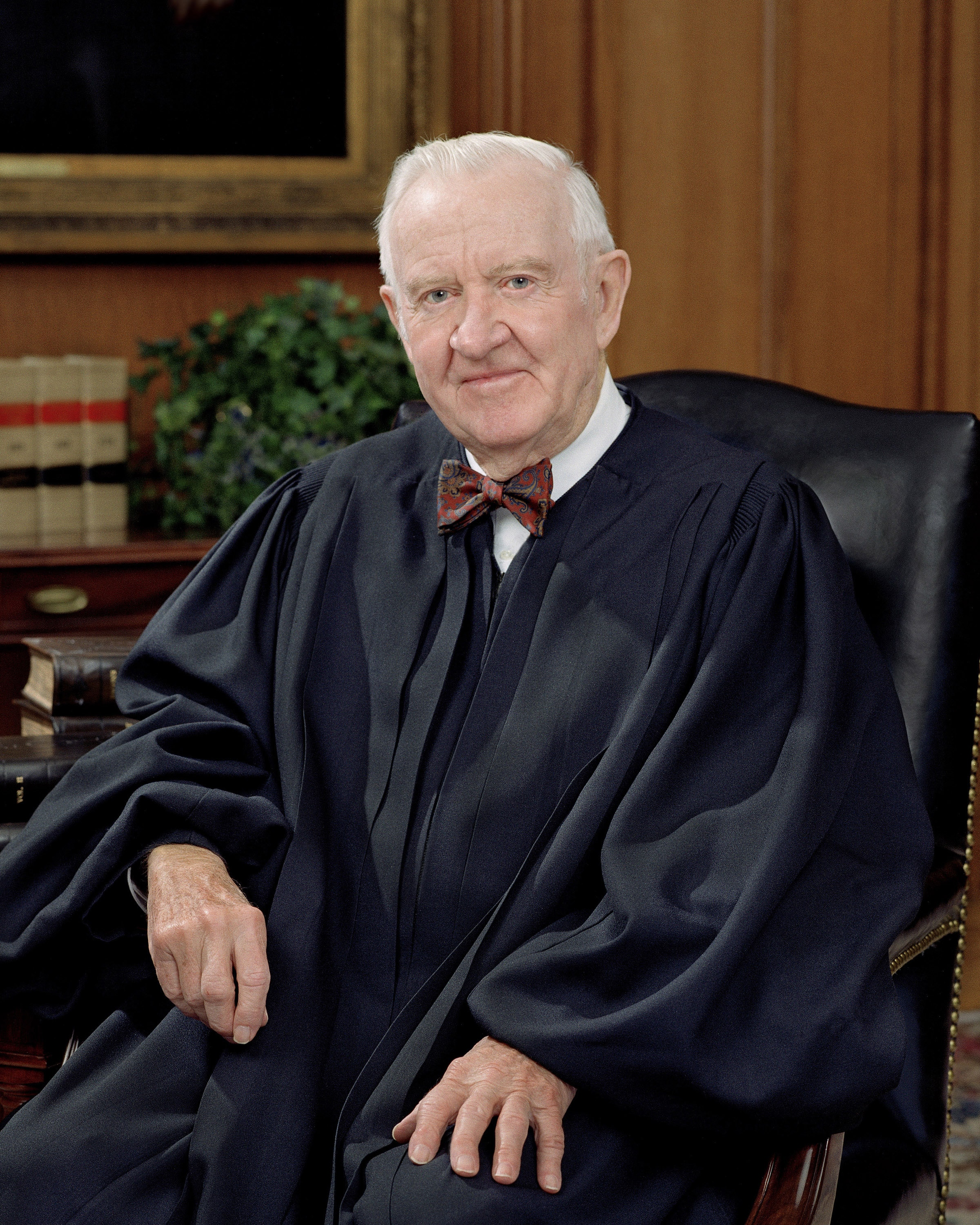
John Paul Stevens, appointed by Nixon to the United States Court of Appeals for the Seventh Circuit, would later serve on the Supreme Court.

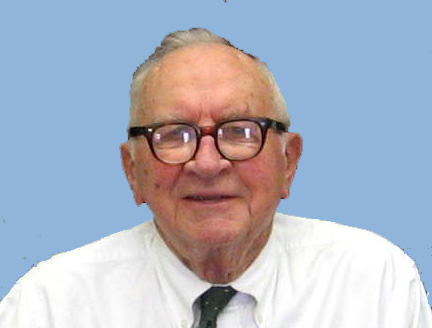
Hiram Emory Widener, Jr. of the United States Court of Appeals for the Fourth Circuit was Nixon's longest-serving active Court of Appeals appointee.

== United States Supreme Court justices ==
#	Justice	Seat	State	Former justice	Nomination date	Confirmation date	Confirmation vote	Began active service	Ended active service	Ended retired service
1	Warren E. Burger	Chief	Virginia	Earl Warren	May 22, 1969	June 9, 1969	74–3	June 23, 1969	September 26, 1986	June 25, 1995
2	Harry Blackmun	2	Minnesota	Abe Fortas	April 15, 1970	May 12, 1970	94–0	May 14, 1970	August 3, 1994	March 4, 1999
3	Lewis F. Powell Jr.	1	Virginia	Hugo Black	October 22, 1971	December 6, 1971	89–1	January 7, 1972	June 26, 1987	August 25, 1998
4	William Rehnquist	9	Arizona (Note: Rehnquist was born and raised in Wisconsin, and lived and worked for various periods of years in Ohio, California, and Washington D.C., before settling in Arizona.)	John Marshall Harlan II	October 22, 1971	December 10, 1971	68–26	January 7, 1972	September 26, 1986	Elevated

== Courts of appeals ==
#	Judge	Circuit	Nomination date	Confirmation date	Began active service	Ended active service	Ended senior status
1	George MacKinnon	D.C.	April 23, 1969	May 5, 1969	May 6, 1969	May 20, 1983	May 1, 1995
2	Roger Robb	D.C.	April 23, 1969	May 5, 1969	May 6, 1969	May 31, 1982	December 19, 1985
3	G. Harrold Carswell	Fifth	May 12, 1969	June 19, 1969	June 20, 1969	April 20, 1970	–
4	Eugene Allen Wright	Ninth	June 23, 1969	September 12, 1969	September 15, 1969	September 15, 1983	September 3, 2002
5	John Kilkenny	Ninth	May 12, 1969	September 12, 1969	September 16, 1969	November 1, 1971	February 17, 1995
6	Ozell Miller Trask	Ninth	June 26, 1969	September 12, 1969	September 16, 1969	October 31, 1979	May 5, 1984
7	Arlin Adams	Third	September 22, 1969	October 1, 1969	October 2, 1969	January 2, 1987	–
8	Charles Clark	Fifth	October 7, 1969	October 15, 1969	October 17, 1969	January 15, 1992	–
9	Henry Luesing Brooks	Sixth	August 13, 1969	December 10, 1969	December 11, 1969	December 30, 1971	–
10	John Joseph Gibbons	Third	December 5, 1969	December 17, 1969	December 18, 1969	January 15, 1990	–
11	Joe McDonald Ingraham	Fifth	December 2, 1969	December 17, 1969	December 18, 1969	July 31, 1973	May 27, 1990
12	Malcolm Richard Wilkey	D.C.	February 16, 1970	February 24, 1970	February 25, 1970	December 6, 1984	November 8, 1985
13	Wilbur Frank Pell Jr.	Seventh	December 15, 1969 (Note: Renominated on January 23, 1970.)	April 23, 1970	April 24, 1970	July 31, 1984	September 25, 2000
14	William Ernest Miller	Sixth	March 3, 1970	June 26, 1970	July 8, 1970	April 12, 1976	–
15	Max Rosenn	Third	September 3, 1970	October 6, 1970	October 7, 1970	January 21, 1981	February 7, 2006
16	Robert Hugh McWilliams Jr.	Tenth	September 22, 1970	October 8, 1970	October 14, 1970	August 31, 1984	April 10, 2013
17	John Paul Stevens	Seventh	September 22, 1970	October 8, 1970	October 14, 1970	December 18, 1975	Elevated
18	Paul Hitch Roney	Fifth / Eleventh	October 7, 1970	October 13, 1970	October 16, 1970	October 1, 1989	September 16, 2006
19	Donald Roe Ross	Eighth	November 30, 1970	December 11, 1970	December 12, 1970	June 13, 1987	December 18, 2013
20	W. Wallace Kent	Sixth	December 8, 1970	December 16, 1970	December 18, 1970	May 28, 1973	–
21	James E. Barrett	Tenth	March 25, 1971	April 21, 1971	April 23, 1971	April 8, 1987	November 7, 2011
22	Herbert Choy	Ninth	April 7, 1971	April 21, 1971	April 23, 1971	October 3, 1984	March 10, 2004
23	Donald S. Russell	Fourth	April 7, 1971	April 21, 1971	April 23, 1971	February 22, 1998	–
24	Robert Arthur Sprecher	Seventh	March 29, 1971	April 21, 1971	April 23, 1971	May 15, 1982	–
25	William Edward Doyle	Tenth	March 25, 1971	April 21, 1971	April 26, 1971	December 28, 1984	May 2, 1986
26	Walter R. Mansfield	Second	April 26, 1971	May 20, 1971	May 20, 1971	July 2, 1981	January 8, 1987
27	William Hughes Mulligan	Second	April 26, 1971	May 20, 1971	May 27, 1971	March 31, 1981	–
28	James L. Oakes	Second	May 3, 1971	May 20, 1971	May 27, 1971	June 30, 1992	October 13, 2007
29	Roy Laverne Stephenson	Eighth	June 1, 1971	June 18, 1971	June 22, 1971	April 1, 1982	November 5, 1982
30	William H. Timbers	Second	May 13, 1971	July 29, 1971	July 29, 1971	July 10, 1981	November 26, 1994
31	John A. Field Jr.	Fourth	September 8, 1971	September 21, 1971	September 22, 1971	April 1, 1976	December 16, 1995
32	James Rosen	Third	July 19, 1971	September 21, 1971	September 22, 1971	November 18, 1972	–
33	James Hunter III	Third	July 19, 1971	September 21, 1971	September 23, 1971	June 30, 1986	February 10, 1989
34	Alfred Goodwin	Ninth	November 3, 1971	November 23, 1971	November 30, 1971	January 31, 1991	December 27, 2022
35	J. Clifford Wallace	Ninth	May 22, 1972	June 28, 1972	June 28, 1972	April 8, 1996	Incumbent
36	Levin H. Campbell	First	June 15, 1972	June 28, 1972	June 30, 1972	January 3, 1992	Incumbent
37	Pierce Lively	Sixth	September 12, 1972	October 3, 1972	October 5, 1972	January 1, 1989	March 12, 2016
38	Hiram Emory Widener Jr.	Fourth	September 25, 1972	October 12, 1972	October 17, 1972	July 17, 2007	September 19, 2007
39	Joseph F. Weis Jr.	Third	February 13, 1973	March 14, 1973	March 15, 1973	April 1, 1988	March 19, 2014
40	Thomas Gibbs Gee	Fifth	June 11, 1973	July 13, 1973	July 18, 1973	February 1, 1991	–
41	William H. Webster	Eighth	June 13, 1973	July 13, 1973	July 18, 1973	February 22, 1978	–
42	Leonard I. Garth	Third	July 19, 1973	August 3, 1973	August 6, 1973	June 30, 1986	September 22, 2016
43	Joseph Tyree Sneed III	Ninth	July 25, 1973	August 3, 1973	August 24, 1973	July 21, 1987	February 9, 2008
44	Albert J. Engel Jr.	Sixth	December 5, 1973	December 13, 1973	December 19, 1973	October 1, 1989	April 5, 2013
45	Philip Willis Tone	Seventh	April 22, 1974	May 6, 1974	May 14, 1974	April 30, 1980	–

== District courts ==
#	Judge	Court (Note: See List of United States district and territorial courts)	Nomination date	Confirmation date	Began active service	Ended active service	Ended senior status
1	James F. Battin	D. Mont.	February 20, 1969	February 25, 1969	February 27, 1969	February 13, 1990	September 27, 1996
2	John Berne Hannum	E.D. Pa.	March 24, 1969	May 5, 1969	May 6, 1969	May 29, 1984	April 23, 2007
3	David W. Williams	C.D. Cal.	May 8, 1969	June 19, 1969	June 20, 1969	January 17, 1981	May 6, 2000
4	Gerald Sanford Levin	N.D. Cal.	June 13, 1969	July 11, 1969	July 14, 1969	June 5, 1971	–
5	Hiram Emory Widener Jr.	W.D. Va.	June 19, 1969	July 11, 1969	July 14, 1969	October 27, 1972	Elevated
6	Frank Hampton McFadden	N.D. Ala.	July 22, 1969	August 8, 1969	August 9, 1969	January 1, 1982	–
7	Alfred Goodwin	D. Ore.	September 22, 1969	December 10, 1969	December 11, 1969	December 17, 1971	Elevated
8	Robert Dixon Herman	M.D. Pa.	October 2, 1969	December 10, 1969	December 11, 1969	September 25, 1981	April 5, 1990
9	David Lycurgus Middlebrooks Jr.	N.D. Fla.	October 6, 1969	December 10, 1969	December 11, 1969	August 1, 1974	–
10	George H. Barlow	D.N.J.	July 22, 1969	December 17, 1969	December 18, 1969	March 4, 1979	–
11	Leonard I. Garth	D.N.J.	July 22, 1969	December 17, 1969	December 18, 1969	August 29, 1973	Elevated
12	Philip Charles Wilkins	E.D. Cal.	October 23, 1969	December 17, 1969	December 18, 1969	January 27, 1983	July 8, 1998
13	Barrington D. Parker	D.D.C.	September 15, 1969	December 18, 1969	December 19, 1969	December 19, 1985	June 2, 1993
14	Andrew Wendell Bogue	D.S.D.	March 19, 1970	April 23, 1970	April 24, 1970	July 1, 1985	June 10, 2009
15	James L. Oakes	D. Vt.	March 31, 1970	April 23, 1970	April 24, 1970	June 5, 1971	Elevated
16	Howard Boyd Turrentine	S.D. Cal.	February 19, 1970	April 23, 1970	April 24, 1970	January 22, 1984	August 20, 2010
17	Warren Keith Urbom	D. Neb.	March 11, 1970	April 23, 1970	April 24, 1970	December 31, 1990	July 28, 2017
18	Joseph F. Weis Jr.	W.D. Pa.	March 11, 1970	April 23, 1970	April 24, 1970	March 27, 1973	Elevated
19	Garnett Thomas Eisele	E.D. Ark.	January 23, 1970	August 5, 1970	August 6, 1970	August 1, 1991	November 26, 2017
20	Cornelia Groefsema Kennedy	E.D. Mich.	September 3, 1970	October 6, 1970	October 7, 1970	October 3, 1979	Elevated
21	Edward R. Becker	E.D. Pa.	September 24, 1970	October 8, 1970	October 14, 1970	January 22, 1982	Elevated
22	William W. Knox	W.D. Pa.	September 28, 1970	October 8, 1970	October 14, 1970	August 30, 1981	–
23	Frank James McGarr	N.D. Ill.	September 22, 1970	October 8, 1970	October 14, 1970	June 30, 1986	January 15, 1988
24	Edwin L. Mechem	D.N.M.	September 3, 1970	October 8, 1970	October 14, 1970	July 3, 1982	November 27, 2002
25	Leland Clure Morton	M.D. Tenn.	September 21, 1970	October 8, 1970	October 14, 1970	July 31, 1984	April 11, 1998
26	Malcolm Muir	M.D. Pa.	September 28, 1970	October 8, 1970	October 14, 1970	August 31, 1984	July 22, 2011
27	Sam C. Pointer Jr.	N.D. Ala.	September 22, 1970	October 8, 1970	October 14, 1970	November 19, 1999	April 3, 2000
28	Walter King Stapleton	D. Del.	September 22, 1970	October 8, 1970	October 14, 1970	May 8, 1985	Elevated
29	Carl Olaf Bue Jr.	S.D. Tex.	August 11, 1970	October 13, 1970	October 15, 1970	September 2, 1987	December 24, 2020
30	John William Ditter Jr.	E.D. Pa.	September 28, 1970	October 8, 1970	October 15, 1970	October 19, 1986	April 7, 2019
31	Daniel Henry Huyett III	E.D. Pa.	September 25, 1970	October 8, 1970	October 15, 1970	May 1, 1988	May 1, 1998
32	James Rogers Miller Jr.	D. Md.	September 28, 1970	October 13, 1970	October 15, 1970	December 1, 1986	–
33	Robert Howard Schnacke	N.D. Cal.	September 10, 1970	October 13, 1970	October 15, 1970	December 31, 1983	June 5, 1994
34	Nauman Scott	W.D. La.	September 14, 1970	October 13, 1970	October 15, 1970	December 4, 1984	September 19, 2001
35	Donald West VanArtsdalen	E.D. Pa.	September 10, 1970	October 8, 1970	October 15, 1970	October 21, 1985	May 21, 2019
36	Clifton Rhodes Bratcher	W.D. Ky.	October 7, 1970	October 13, 1970	October 16, 1970	July 25, 1977	–
37	Samuel Conti	N.D. Cal.	October 7, 1970	October 13, 1970	October 16, 1970	November 1, 1987	August 29, 2018
38	Peter T. Fay	S.D. Fla.	October 7, 1970	October 13, 1970	October 16, 1970	October 8, 1976	Elevated
39	Clarkson Sherman Fisher	D.N.J.	October 7, 1970	October 13, 1970	October 16, 1970	October 1, 1987	July 27, 1997
40	John Joseph Kitchen	D.N.J.	October 7, 1970	October 13, 1970	October 16, 1970	September 21, 1973	–
41	Robert B. Krupansky	N.D. Ohio	October 7, 1970	October 13, 1970	October 16, 1970	March 19, 1982	Elevated
42	Charles Allen Moye Jr.	N.D. Ga.	October 7, 1970	October 13, 1970	October 16, 1970	January 1, 1988	July 26, 2010
43	William Clark O'Kelley	N.D. Ga.	October 7, 1970	October 13, 1970	October 16, 1970	October 1, 1996	July 5, 2017
44	Gordon Thompson Jr.	S.D. Cal.	October 7, 1970	October 13, 1970	October 16, 1970	December 28, 1994	July 5, 2015
45	Gerald Bard Tjoflat	M.D. Fla.	October 7, 1970	October 13, 1970	October 16, 1970	December 12, 1975	Elevated
46	J. Clifford Wallace	S.D. Cal.	October 7, 1970	October 13, 1970	October 16, 1970	July 14, 1972	Elevated
47	James Lawrence King	S.D. Fla.	October 7, 1970	October 13, 1970	October 19, 1970	December 20, 1992	May 2, 2026
48	Nicholas Joseph Walinski Jr.	N.D. Ohio	October 7, 1970	October 13, 1970	October 21, 1970	December 1, 1985	December 24, 1992
49	Owen DeVol Cox	S.D. Tex.	October 7, 1970	November 25, 1970	December 1, 1970	March 20, 1981	July 21, 1990
50	John Feikens	E.D. Mich.	October 7, 1970 (Note: Originally nominated to a different seat on the same court by President Eisenhower on June 10, 1960. Renominated January 10, 1961. Given a recess appointment on October 13, 1960. Service ended on September 27, 1961, after the nomination wasn't confirmed.)	November 25, 1970	December 1, 1970	March 1, 1986	May 15, 2011
51	William C. Frey	D. Ariz.	October 7, 1970	November 25, 1970	December 1, 1970	February 16, 1979	–
52	Robert Madden Hill	N.D. Tex.	October 7, 1970	November 25, 1970	December 1, 1970	July 20, 1984	Elevated
53	Philip Pratt	E.D. Mich.	October 7, 1970	November 25, 1970	December 1, 1970	February 7, 1989	–
54	William Steger	E.D. Tex.	October 7, 1970	November 25, 1970	December 1, 1970	December 31, 1987	June 4, 2006
55	José Victor Toledo	D.P.R.	November 16, 1970	November 25, 1970	December 1, 1970	February 3, 1980	–
56	John H. Wood Jr.	W.D. Tex.	October 7, 1970	November 25, 1970	December 1, 1970	May 29, 1979	–
57	Franklin Taylor Dupree Jr.	E.D.N.C.	November 30, 1970	December 11, 1970	December 12, 1970	December 31, 1983	December 17, 1995
58	Hubert Teitelbaum	W.D. Pa.	November 24, 1970	December 11, 1970	December 12, 1970	July 2, 1985	January 5, 1995
59	Harry W. Wellford	W.D. Tenn.	November 24, 1970	December 11, 1970	December 12, 1970	September 10, 1982	Elevated
60	Albert J. Engel Jr.	W.D. Mich.	December 15, 1970	December 17, 1970	December 18, 1970	January 4, 1974	Elevated
61	Dennis Raymond Knapp	S.D. W. Va.	December 8, 1970	December 16, 1970	December 18, 1970	February 25, 1983	December 25, 1998
62	Barron Patterson McCune	W.D. Pa.	December 8, 1970	December 16, 1970	December 18, 1970	April 1, 1985	September 10, 2008
63	Fred M. Winner	D. Colo.	December 8, 1970	December 16, 1970	December 18, 1970	April 8, 1982	August 1, 1984
64	James Henry Gorbey	E.D. Pa.	November 30, 1970	December 19, 1970	December 21, 1970	October 24, 1977	–
65	Robert J. Kelleher	C.D. Cal.	December 15, 1970	December 17, 1970	December 21, 1970	March 5, 1983	June 20, 2012
66	William H. Webster	E.D. Mo.	December 8, 1970	December 17, 1970	December 21, 1970	August 10, 1973	Elevated
67	Harris Kenneth Wangelin	E.D. Mo. W.D. Mo.	December 8, 1970	December 17, 1970	December 22, 1970	May 10, 1983	June 10, 1987
68	Frederick Bernard Lacey	D.N.J.	October 7, 1970	October 13, 1970	January 26, 1971	February 3, 1986	–
69	Robert V. Denney	D. Neb.	January 28, 1971	March 4, 1971	March 5, 1971	April 16, 1981	June 26, 1981
70	Raymond J. Broderick	E.D. Pa.	March 23, 1971	April 21, 1971	April 23, 1971	July 1, 1984	August 6, 2000
71	Richard Cameron Freeman	N.D. Ga.	March 3, 1971	April 21, 1971	April 23, 1971	December 31, 1991	August 22, 1999
72	Walter T. McGovern	W.D. Wash.	March 29, 1971	April 21, 1971	April 23, 1971	September 30, 1987	July 8, 2021
73	Thomas Roberts McMillen	N.D. Ill.	March 29, 1971	April 21, 1971	April 23, 1971	December 31, 1984	September 8, 1985
74	Robert Edward Varner	M.D. Ala.	December 4, 1970 (Note: Renominated on February 10, 1971.)	April 21, 1971	April 23, 1971	June 12, 1986	May 17, 2006
75	Charles Robert Richey	D.D.C.	April 14, 1971	April 29, 1971	May 5, 1971	January 23, 1997	March 19, 1997
76	William Matthew Byrne Jr.	C.D. Cal.	April 21, 1971 (Note: Was previously nominated by President Johnson on October 1, 1968, to a different seat on the same court. That nomination expired at the end of the term. Renominated by President Johnson on January 9, 1969. That nomination was withdrawn by President Nixon on January 23, 1969. Renominated on April 21, 1971, by President Nixon to a different seat on the same court.)	May 20, 1971	May 20, 1971	February 28, 1998	January 12, 2006
77	Mark Americus Costantino	E.D.N.Y.	April 26, 1971	May 20, 1971	May 20, 1971	December 1, 1987	June 17, 1990
78	Murray Gurfein	S.D.N.Y.	April 14, 1971	May 20, 1971	May 20, 1971	September 11, 1974	Elevated
79	Leland Chris Nielsen	S.D. Cal.	April 21, 1971	May 20, 1971	May 20, 1971	June 14, 1985	September 23, 1999
80	Lawrence W. Pierce	S.D.N.Y.	April 26, 1971	May 20, 1971	May 20, 1971	November 30, 1981	Elevated
81	Carl Bernard Rubin	S.D. Ohio	April 29, 1971	May 20, 1971	May 20, 1971	August 2, 1995	–
82	Robert F. Chapman	D.S.C.	May 18, 1971	May 26, 1971	May 27, 1971	October 2, 1981	Elevated
83	Solomon Blatt Jr.	D.S.C.	May 18, 1971	May 26, 1971	May 28, 1971	May 7, 1990	April 20, 2016
84	Jack Murphy Gordon	E.D. La.	April 14, 1971	June 18, 1971	June 22, 1971	March 4, 1982	–
85	Roger Blake West	E.D. La.	April 14, 1971	June 18, 1971	June 22, 1971	January 24, 1978	–
86	Aldon J. Anderson	D. Utah	June 17, 1971	July 22, 1971	July 22, 1971	December 20, 1984	March 24, 1996
87	Robert Edward DeMascio	E.D. Mich.	June 14, 1971	July 22, 1971	July 22, 1971	January 16, 1988	March 23, 1999
88	Edward Raymond Neaher	E.D.N.Y.	June 14, 1971	July 22, 1971	July 22, 1971	May 28, 1982	April 19, 1994
89	Paul Benson	D.N.D.	July 12, 1971	July 29, 1971	July 29, 1971	December 31, 1985	April 22, 2004
90	Charles Stanley Blair	D. Md.	July 14, 1971	July 29, 1971	July 29, 1971	April 20, 1980	–
91	Charles L. Brieant	S.D.N.Y.	June 24, 1971	July 29, 1971	July 29, 1971	May 31, 2007	July 20, 2008
92	Albert Vickers Bryan Jr.	E.D. Va.	July 19, 1971	July 29, 1971	July 29, 1971	December 1, 1991	August 27, 2019
93	Malcolm Lucas	C.D. Cal.	July 8, 1971	July 29, 1971	July 29, 1971	April 6, 1984	–
94	Lawrence Tupper Lydick	C.D. Cal.	July 8, 1971	July 29, 1971	July 29, 1971	March 1, 1984	December 17, 1995
95	Herbert Frazier Murray	D. Md.	July 19, 1971	July 29, 1971	July 29, 1971	December 31, 1988	July 12, 1999
96	Spencer Mortimer Williams	N.D. Cal.	July 12, 1971	July 29, 1971	July 29, 1971	February 24, 1987	January 3, 2008
97	Joseph H. Young	D. Md.	July 19, 1971	July 29, 1971	July 29, 1971	August 1, 1987	March 14, 2015
98	Sherman Glenn Finesilver	D. Colo.	September 8, 1971	September 21, 1971	September 22, 1971	May 31, 1994	December 31, 1994
99	William Brevard Hand	S.D. Ala.	July 26, 1971	September 21, 1971	September 22, 1971	January 19, 1989	September 6, 2008
100	Earl Eugene O'Connor	D. Kan.	October 19, 1971	October 28, 1971	November 1, 1971	March 1, 1992	November 29, 1998
101	William Corwin Stuart	S.D. Iowa	October 13, 1971	October 28, 1971	November 1, 1971	April 30, 1986	August 12, 2010
102	William J. Bauer	N.D. Ill.	September 14, 1971	November 8, 1971	November 10, 1971	January 3, 1975	Elevated
103	Charles M. Allen	W.D. Ky.	November 17, 1971	November 23, 1971	November 30, 1971	October 1, 1985	January 4, 2000
104	Levin H. Campbell	D. Mass.	November 12, 1971	November 23, 1971	November 30, 1971	August 31, 1972	Elevated
105	James Stuart Holden	D. Vt.	November 11, 1971	November 23, 1971	November 30, 1971	January 29, 1984	November 18, 1996
106	Clarence Charles Newcomer	E.D. Pa.	November 17, 1971	November 23, 1971	November 30, 1971	January 19, 1988	August 22, 2005
107	Ralph Francis Scalera	W.D. Pa.	November 12, 1971	November 23, 1971	November 30, 1971	May 1, 1976	–
108	Leroy John Contie Jr.	N.D. Ohio	November 19, 1971	December 1, 1971	December 6, 1971	March 23, 1982	Elevated
109	Thomas Aquinas Flannery	D.D.C.	November 18, 1971	December 1, 1971	December 6, 1971	May 10, 1985	September 20, 2007
110	Kenneth Keller Hall	S.D. W. Va.	November 22, 1971	December 1, 1971	December 6, 1971	September 26, 1976	Elevated
111	Anthony Alaimo	S.D. Ga.	November 29, 1971	December 2, 1971	December 9, 1971	July 1, 1991	December 30, 2009
112	J. Blaine Anderson	D. Idaho	December 1, 1971	December 4, 1971	December 9, 1971	July 23, 1976	Elevated
113	Richard A. Dier	D. Neb.	December 2, 1971	December 6, 1971	December 9, 1971	December 7, 1972	–
114	Clifford Scott Green	E.D. Pa.	December 1, 1971	December 4, 1971	December 9, 1971	April 2, 1988	May 31, 2007
115	Charles Byron Renfrew	N.D. Cal.	November 29, 1971	December 2, 1971	December 9, 1971	February 27, 1980	–
116	Morell Edward Sharp	W.D. Wash.	November 24, 1971	December 2, 1971	December 9, 1971	October 19, 1980	–
117	Arnold Bauman	S.D.N.Y.	December 2, 1971	December 11, 1971	December 15, 1971	August 15, 1974	–
118	Lee Parsons Gagliardi	S.D.N.Y.	December 2, 1971	December 11, 1971	December 15, 1971	July 17, 1985	October 30, 1998
119	William Terrell Hodges	M.D. Fla.	December 8, 1971	December 11, 1971	December 15, 1971	May 2, 1999	January 4, 2022
120	Jon O. Newman	D. Conn.	December 2, 1971	December 11, 1971	December 15, 1971	June 25, 1979	Elevated
121	Bruce Van Sickle	D.N.D.	December 10, 1971	December 11, 1971	December 15, 1971	February 28, 1985	April 21, 2007
122	Richard Wellington McLaren	N.D. Ill.	December 2, 1971	December 2, 1971	January 26, 1972	February 25, 1976	–
123	Philip Willis Tone	N.D. Ill.	November 29, 1971	December 2, 1971	January 26, 1972	May 17, 1974	Elevated
124	Wilbur Dawson Owens Jr.	M.D. Ga.	January 21, 1972	February 17, 1972	March 1, 1972	February 1, 1995	April 28, 2010
125	Louis Bechtle	E.D. Pa.	February 14, 1972	March 2, 1972	March 7, 1972	April 30, 1993	June 30, 2001
126	James L. Foreman	E.D. Ill./S.D. Ill.	February 16, 1972	March 2, 1972	March 7, 1972	June 1, 1992	June 3, 2012
127	Howard David Hermansdorfer	E.D. Ky.	February 16, 1972	March 2, 1972	March 7, 1972	January 31, 1981	–
128	James M. Burns	D. Ore.	March 22, 1972	May 25, 1972	June 2, 1972	November 24, 1989	December 21, 2001
129	Norman Charles Roettger Jr.	S.D. Fla.	April 13, 1972	May 31, 1972	June 2, 1972	June 17, 1997	July 26, 2003
130	Otto Richard Skopil Jr.	D. Ore.	March 22, 1972	March 25, 1972	June 2, 1972	October 20, 1979	Elevated
131	Albert Wheeler Coffrin	D. Vt.	May 3, 1972	June 8, 1972	June 9, 1972	January 31, 1989	January 13, 1993
132	Charles Wycliffe Joiner	E.D. Mich.	April 25, 1972	June 8, 1972	June 9, 1972	August 15, 1984	March 10, 2017
133	Samuel Pailthorpe King	D. Haw.	May 22, 1972	June 28, 1972	June 28, 1972	November 30, 1984	December 7, 2010
134	Hiram Hamilton Ward	M.D.N.C.	May 18, 1972	June 28, 1972	June 28, 1972	August 20, 1988	April 4, 2002
135	William Benner Enright	S.D. Cal.	June 13, 1972	June 28, 1972	June 30, 1972	July 12, 1990	March 7, 2020
136	Thomas P. Griesa	S.D.N.Y.	June 15, 1972	June 28, 1972	June 30, 1972	March 13, 2000	December 24, 2017
137	Whitman Knapp	S.D.N.Y.	June 15, 1972	June 28, 1972	June 30, 1972	November 23, 1987	June 14, 2004
138	Charles E. Stewart Jr.	S.D.N.Y.	June 15, 1972	June 28, 1972	June 30, 1972	January 2, 1985	October 28, 1994
139	Eldon Brooks Mahon	N.D. Tex.	June 23, 1972	June 28, 1972	July 3, 1972	October 1, 1989	December 3, 2005
140	Robert L. Carter	S.D.N.Y.	June 15, 1972	July 21, 1972	July 25, 1972	December 31, 1986	January 3, 2012
141	Marshall Allen Neill	E.D. Wash.	June 13, 1972	August 2, 1972	August 9, 1972	October 6, 1979	–
142	Kevin Duffy	S.D.N.Y.	September 25, 1972	October 12, 1972	October 17, 1972	January 10, 1998	September 30, 2016
143	Frank Harlan Freedman	D. Mass.	August 14, 1972	October 12, 1972	October 17, 1972	January 1, 1992	August 21, 2003
144	Hernan Gregorio Pesquera	D.P.R.	September 5, 1972	October 12, 1972	October 17, 1972	September 8, 1982	–
145	Joseph L. Tauro	D. Mass.	September 12, 1972	October 12, 1972	October 17, 1972	September 26, 2013	November 30, 2018
146	James Clinton Turk	W.D. Va.	September 25, 1972	October 12, 1972	October 17, 1972	November 1, 2002	July 6, 2014
147	Robert Joseph Ward	S.D.N.Y.	September 25, 1972	October 12, 1972	October 17, 1972	February 1, 1991	August 5, 2003
148	Vincent P. Biunno	D.N.J.	February 21, 1973	April 10, 1973	April 17, 1973	March 23, 1982	July 30, 1991
149	James Hughes Hancock	N.D. Ala.	March 20, 1973	April 10, 1973	April 17, 1973	May 1, 1996	July 24, 2020
150	Daniel John Snyder Jr.	W.D. Pa.	March 6, 1973	April 10, 1973	April 17, 1973	May 11, 1980	–
151	Junius Foy Guin Jr.	N.D. Ala.	March 20, 1973	April 10, 1973	April 18, 1973	February 3, 1989	November 8, 2016
152	Albert Gerard Schatz	D. Neb.	April 12, 1973	May 10, 1973	May 11, 1973	April 30, 1985	–
153	Herbert Allan Fogel	E.D. Pa.	February 13, 1973	May 14, 1973	May 15, 1973	May 1, 1978	–
154	Prentice Marshall	N.D. Ill.	June 27, 1973	July 13, 1973	July 18, 1973	October 19, 1988	April 15, 1996
155	John Francis Nangle	E.D. Mo.	June 13, 1973	July 13, 1973	July 18, 1973	May 10, 1990	August 24, 2008
156	Harlington Wood Jr.	S.D. Ill.	May 11, 1973	July 13, 1973	July 18, 1973	May 28, 1976	Elevated
157	John A. Reed Jr.	M.D. Fla.	July 6, 1973	August 3, 1973	August 6, 1973	December 31, 1984	–
158	Allen Sharp	N.D. Ind.	September 13, 1973	October 4, 1973	October 11, 1973	November 1, 2007	July 10, 2009
159	William C. Conner	S.D.N.Y.	November 9, 1973	December 13, 1973	December 19, 1973	March 31, 1987	July 9, 2009
160	R. James Harvey	E.D. Mich.	December 5, 1973	December 13, 1973	December 19, 1973	March 31, 1984	July 20, 2019
161	Richard Owen	S.D.N.Y.	November 15, 1973	December 13, 1973	December 19, 1973	September 30, 1989	November 20, 2015
162	Walter Jay Skinner	D. Mass.	October 10, 1973	December 14, 1973	December 19, 1973	September 14, 1992	May 8, 2005
163	Herbert Jay Stern	D.N.J.	December 7, 1973	December 19, 1973	December 28, 1973	January 4, 1987	–
164	Robert Firth	C.D. Cal.	February 6, 1974	March 1, 1974	March 8, 1974	October 31, 1979	January 4, 1984
165	Richard Paul Matsch	D. Colo.	January 31, 1974	March 1, 1974	March 8, 1974	July 1, 2003	May 26, 2019
166	Joseph Leo McGlynn Jr.	E.D. Pa.	January 31, 1974	March 1, 1974	March 8, 1974	February 14, 1990	February 23, 1999
167	Thomas Collier Platt Jr.	E.D.N.Y.	January 31, 1974	March 1, 1974	March 8, 1974	February 1, 2001	March 4, 2017
168	Tom Stagg	W.D. La.	February 18, 1974	March 7, 1974	March 8, 1974	February 29, 1992	June 23, 2015
169	Joseph Wilson Morris	E.D. Okla.	March 19, 1974	April 5, 1974	April 12, 1974	July 31, 1978	–
170	Wendell Alverson Miles	W.D. Mich.	March 29, 1974	April 10, 1974	April 17, 1974	May 6, 1986	July 30, 2013
171	Murray Merle Schwartz	D. Del.	March 21, 1974	April 5, 1974	April 17, 1974	July 24, 1989	January 11, 2013
172	David Dortch Warriner	E.D. Va.	May 6, 1974	May 16, 1974	May 21, 1974	March 17, 1986	–
173	Robert Morton Duncan	S.D. Ohio	May 1, 1974	June 13, 1974	June 20, 1974	April 15, 1985	–
174	Robert William Porter	N.D. Tex.	April 22, 1974	June 13, 1974	June 20, 1974	January 17, 1990	November 6, 1991
175	Donald S. Voorhees	W.D. Wash.	May 28, 1974	June 13, 1974	June 20, 1974	November 30, 1986	July 7, 1989
176	Henry Curtis Meanor	D.N.J.	May 8, 1974	June 13, 1974	June 25, 1974	February 7, 1983	–
177	William H. Orrick Jr.	N.D. Cal.	May 31, 1974	June 21, 1974	July 8, 1974	October 31, 1985	August 14, 2003
178	Henry Frederick Werker	S.D.N.Y.	May 31, 1974	June 21, 1974	July 9, 1974	May 10, 1984	–
179	James Clinkscales Hill	N.D. Ga.	July 9, 1974	August 8, 1974	August 9, 1974	May 26, 1976	Elevated

== Specialty courts (Article III) ==
=== United States Court of Customs and Patent Appeals ===
#	Judge	Nomination date	Confirmation date	Began active service	Ended active service	Ended senior status
1	Donald Edward Lane	May 14, 1969	June 19, 1969	June 20, 1969	May 30, 1979	–
2	Howard Thomas Markey	May 3, 1972	June 21, 1972	June 22, 1972	April 30, 1991	–
3	Jack Miller	June 28, 1973	June 28, 1973	July 6, 1973	June 6, 1985	August 29, 1994

=== United States Court of Claims ===
#	Judge	Nomination date	Confirmation date	Began active service	Ended active service	Ended senior status
1	Shiro Kashiwa	November 30, 1971	December 2, 1971	January 3, 1972	January 7, 1986	–
2	Robert Lowe Kunzig	November 18, 1971	December 2, 1971	January 3, 1972	February 21, 1982	–
3	Marion T. Bennett	May 22, 1972	June 28, 1972	June 28, 1972	March 1, 1986	September 2, 2000

=== United States Customs Court ===
#	Judge	Nomination date	Confirmation date	Began active service	Ended active service	Ended senior status
1	Nils Boe	July 28, 1971	August 6, 1971	August 10, 1971	April 30, 1984	July 30, 1992

== Notes ==
Renominations

== Sources ==
- Federal Judicial Center
