= John L. Kane Jr. =

American judge (born 1937)

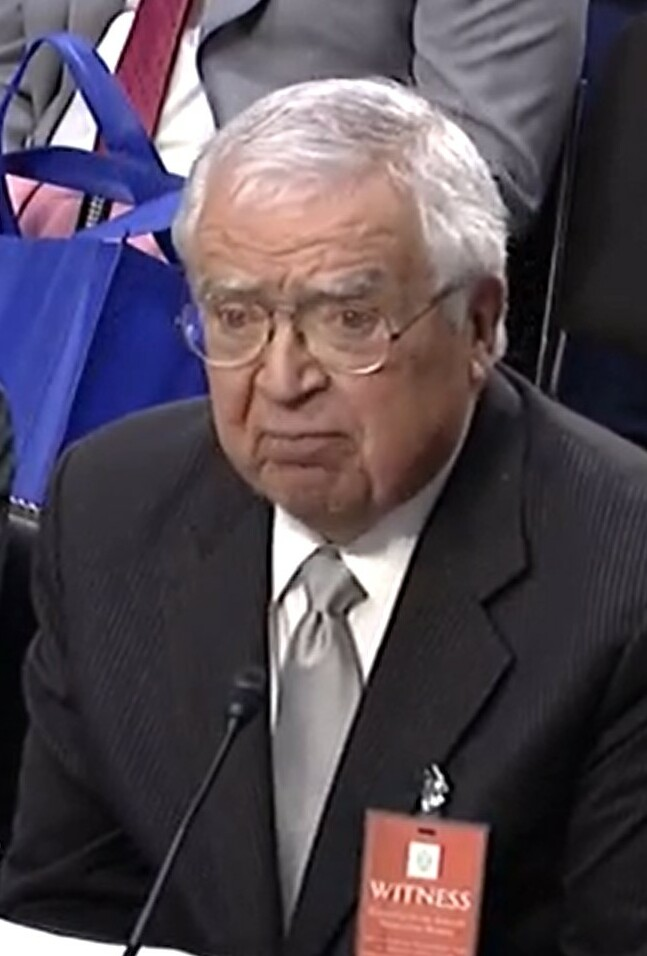
- Kane in 2017

Senior Judge of the United States District Court for the District of Colorado
- Incumbent
- Assumed office April 8, 1988

Judge of the United States District Court for the District of Colorado
- In office December 16, 1977 – April 8, 1988
- Appointed by: Jimmy Carter
- Preceded by: Alfred A. Arraj
- Succeeded by: Lewis Babcock

Personal details
- Born: John Lawrence Kane Jr. February 14, 1937 (age 89) Tucumcari, New Mexico, U.S.
- Education: University of Colorado Boulder (BA); University of Denver (JD)

John Lawrence Kane Jr. (born February 14, 1937) is an American attorney serving as a senior United States district judge of the United States District Court for the District of Colorado.

== Education and career ==
Kane was born in Tucumcari, New Mexico, but his family relocated to Denver during his childhood. He earned a Bachelor of Arts in English literature and philosophy from the University of Colorado Boulder in 1958 and a Juris Doctor from the University of Denver College of Law in 1960, serving as editor of the school’s periodical Dicta.

== Career ==
Kane worked as a law clerk for the Seventeenth Judicial District of Colorado from 1960 to 1961, and worked in private practice in Brighton, Colorado from 1961 to 1963. He served as deputy district attorney of the Seventeenth Judicial District of Colorado from 1961 to 1963, returning to private practice in Denver in 1964. He was the public defender of Adams County in Brighton, Colorado from 1965 to 1967. He was the deputy director of the Peace Corps in the Eastern Region of India in Calcutta (now Kolkata), India from 1967 to 1968, and a Peace Corps Country Representative in Turkey from 1968 to 1969. He was an instructor at Metropolitan State University of Denver from 1973 to 1974, again in private practice in Denver from 1970 to 1977, and an adjunct professor at Sturm College of Law from 1978 to 1988. He was a visiting lecturer in law at Trinity College in Dublin, Ireland in 1989. He was the Miller Distinguished Visiting Professor of Law at Sturm College of Law from 1990 to 1996, and an adjunct professor at the University of Colorado Law School from 1996 to present.

=== Federal judicial service ===
Kane was nominated by President Jimmy Carter on November 2, 1977, to a seat on the United States District Court for the District of Colorado vacated by Judge Alfred A. Arraj. He was confirmed by the United States Senate on December 15, 1977, and received his commission on December 16, 1977.

He assumed senior status due to a certified disability on April 8, 1988. His disability was sleep apnea, brought about by work-related stress. Despite being granted early senior status, he has continued to work a reduced, but substantial caseload to the present.

In 2023, Kane declined to enjoin Colorado’s three-day firearm-purchase waiting-period law. Subsequent year, he fined Colorado for discrimination against Catholic schools.

== See also ==
- List of United States federal judges by longevity of service

== Sources ==
- Hon. John L. Kane District of Colorado

Legal offices
Preceded by Alfred A. Arraj	Judge of the United States District Court for the District of Colorado; 1977–1988	Succeeded by Lewis Babcock
