= Lee Parsons Gagliardi =

American judge

Senior Judge of the United States District Court for the Southern District of New York
- In office July 17, 1985 – October 30, 1998

Judge of the United States District Court for the Southern District of New York
- In office December 15, 1971 – July 17, 1985
- Appointed by: Richard Nixon
- Preceded by: Seat established by 84 Stat. 294
- Succeeded by: Richard J. Daronco

Personal details
- Born: Lee Parsons Gagliardi; July 17, 1918 Larchmont, New York
- Died: October 30, 1998 (aged 80) Manchester, Vermont
- Education: Williams College (A.B.); Columbia Law School (LL.B.)

Lee Parsons Gagliardi (July 17, 1918 – October 30, 1998) was a United States district judge of the United States District Court for the Southern District of New York.

== Education and career ==
Born in Larchmont, New York, Gagliardi received an Artium Baccalaureus degree from Williams College in 1941. He received a Bachelor of Laws from Columbia Law School in 1947. He was a United States Naval Reserve Lieutenant from 1942 to 1945. He was an assistant to the general attorney of the New York Central Railroad Company from 1948 to 1955. He was in private practice of law in New York City from 1955 to 1972. He was Chairman of the Board of Police Commissioners in Mamaroneck, New York from 1970 to 1972.

== Federal judicial service ==
Gagliardi was nominated by President Richard Nixon on December 2, 1971, to the United States District Court for the Southern District of New York, to a new seat created by 84 Stat. 294. He was confirmed by the United States Senate on December 11, 1971, and received his commission on December 15, 1971. He assumed senior status on July 17, 1985. His service was terminated on October 30, 1998, due to his death in Manchester, Vermont.

=== Watergate - Mitchell-Stans Trial ===
On September 11, 1973, Judge Lee P. Gagliardi of U.S. District Court in New York City agreed to postpone for at least a month the trial of former Attorney General John N. Mitchell and former Commerce Secretary Maurice H. Stans on charges arising from the Vesco case. An appeals court had urged the postponement in order to give the defense more time to prepare its case. The trial had been scheduled to begin Sept. 11.

== Sources ==
Legal offices
Preceded by Seat established by 84 Stat. 294	Judge of the United States District Court for the Southern District of New York; 1971–1985	Succeeded by Richard J. Daronco
