= Jean Sala Breitenstein =

American judge (1900–1986)

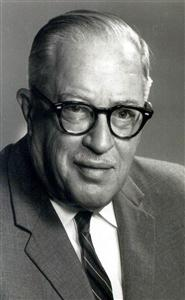

Senior Judge of the United States Court of Appeals for the Tenth Circuit
- In office July 31, 1970 – January 30, 1986

Judge of the United States Court of Appeals for the Tenth Circuit
- In office June 27, 1957 – July 31, 1970
- Appointed by: Dwight D. Eisenhower
- Preceded by: Walter A. Huxman
- Succeeded by: Robert Hugh McWilliams Jr.

Judge of the United States District Court for the District of Colorado
- In office April 27, 1954 – July 9, 1957
- Appointed by: Dwight D. Eisenhower
- Preceded by: Seat established by 68 Stat. 8
- Succeeded by: Alfred A. Arraj

Personal details
- Born: Jean Sala Breitenstein; July 18, 1900 Keokuk, Iowa
- Died: January 30, 1986 (aged 85)
- Education: University of Colorado Boulder (AB); University of Colorado School of Law (LLB)

Jean Sala Breitenstein (July 18, 1900 – January 30, 1986) was a United States circuit judge of the United States Court of Appeals for the Tenth Circuit and previously was a United States district judge of the United States District Court for the District of Colorado.

== Education and career ==
Born in Keokuk, Iowa and moved to Boulder, Colorado in 1907 where he attended public schools. He served in the United States Army towards the end of World War I, in 1918 and was a private. He thereafter received an Artium Baccalaureus degree from the University of Colorado Boulder in 1922 and a Bachelor of Laws from the University of Colorado School of Law in 1924. He was an assistant state attorney general of Colorado from 1925 to 1929. and an Assistant United States Attorney for the District of the Colorado from 1930 to 1933. He was in private practice in Denver, Colorado from 1933 to 1954.

=== Federal judicial service ===
Breitenstein was nominated by President Dwight D. Eisenhower on April 6, 1954, to the United States District Court for the District of Colorado, to a new seat authorized by 68 Stat. 8. He was confirmed by the United States Senate on April 23, 1954, and received his commission on April 27, 1954. His service terminated on July 9, 1957, due to his elevation to the Tenth Circuit.

Breitenstein was nominated by President Eisenhower on June 5, 1957, to a seat on the United States Court of Appeals for the Tenth Circuit vacated by Judge Walter A. Huxman. He was confirmed by the Senate on June 26, 1957, and received his commission the next day. He assumed senior status on July 31, 1970. His service terminated on January 30, 1986, due to his death.

== Sources ==
Legal offices
Preceded by Seat established by 68 Stat. 8	Judge of the United States District Court for the District of Colorado; 1954–1957	Succeeded by Alfred A. Arraj
Preceded by Walter A. Huxman	Judge of the United States Court of Appeals for the Tenth Circuit; 1957–1970	Succeeded by Robert Hugh McWilliams Jr.
