= William Edward Doyle =

American judge (1911–1986)

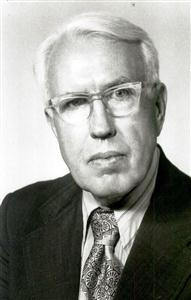

Senior Judge of the United States Court of Appeals for the Tenth Circuit
- In office December 28, 1984 – May 2, 1986

Judge of the United States Court of Appeals for the Tenth Circuit
- In office April 26, 1971 – December 28, 1984
- Nominated by: Richard Nixon
- Preceded by: Alfred P. Murrah
- Succeeded by: David M. Ebel

Judge of the United States District Court for the District of Colorado
- In office September 22, 1961 – May 17, 1971
- Nominated by: John F. Kennedy
- Preceded by: Seat established by 75 Stat. 80
- Succeeded by: Sherman Glenn Finesilver

Personal details
- Born: February 5, 1911 Denver, Colorado, U.S.
- Died: May 2, 1986 (aged 75) Denver, Colorado, U.S.
- Relations: John A. Carroll
- Education: University of Colorado Boulder (AB); George Washington University Law School (LLB)

William Edward Doyle (February 5, 1911 – May 2, 1986) was a United States circuit judge of the United States Court of Appeals for the Tenth Circuit and previously was a United States district judge of the United States District Court for the District of Colorado and a justice of the Colorado Supreme Court.

== Education and career ==
He was born in Denver, Colorado, and attended West High School, where he was an All City football player. He received a Bachelor of Laws from George Washington University Law School in 1937 and an Artium Baccalaureus degree from the University of Colorado Boulder in 1940. He served as deputy district attorney of Denver from 1938 to 1941, before entering private practice in Denver from 1941 to 1943. He was in the United States Army from 1943 to 1945. In World War II, he was a non-commissioned officer serving in the North African and European campaigns and was commissioned as a lieutenant after the war.

He returned to private practice in Denver from 1946 to 1958, and also served as chief deputy district attorney of Denver from 1948 to 1952. He was a judge of the Colorado District Court from 1948 to 1949. He was a justice of the Colorado Supreme Court from 1959 to 1961.

== Federal judicial service ==
Doyle was nominated by President John F. Kennedy on September 14, 1961, to the United States District Court for the District of Colorado, to a new seat authorized by 75 Stat. 80. He was confirmed by the United States Senate on September 21, 1961, and received his commission on September 22, 1961. His service terminated on May 17, 1971, due to elevation to the Tenth Circuit.

Doyle was nominated by President Richard Nixon on March 25, 1971, to a seat on the United States Court of Appeals for the Tenth Circuit vacated by Judge Alfred P. Murrah. He was confirmed by the Senate on April 21, 1971, and received his commission on April 26, 1971. He assumed senior status on December 28, 1984. His service terminated on May 2, 1986, due to his death in Denver.

== Sources ==
Legal offices
Preceded by Seat established by 75 Stat. 80	Judge of the United States District Court for the District of Colorado; 1961–1971	Succeeded by Sherman Glenn Finesilver
Preceded by Alfred P. Murrah	Judge of the United States Court of Appeals for the Tenth Circuit; 1971–1984	Succeeded by David M. Ebel
