= Fred M. Winner =

American judge

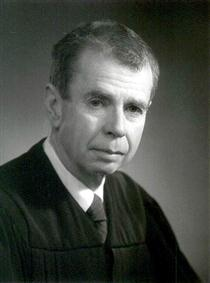

Senior Judge of the United States District Court for the District of Colorado
- In office April 8, 1982 – August 1, 1984

Chief Judge of the United States District Court for the District of Colorado
- In office 1976–1982
- Preceded by: Alfred A. Arraj
- Succeeded by: Sherman Glenn Finesilver

Judge of the United States District Court for the District of Colorado
- In office December 18, 1970 – April 8, 1982
- Appointed by: Richard Nixon
- Preceded by: Seat established by 84 Stat. 294
- Succeeded by: John Carbone Porfilio

Personal details
- Born: Fred M. Winner; April 8, 1912 Denver, Colorado
- Died: January 22, 2003 (aged 90) Grand Junction, Colorado
- Education: University of Colorado Boulder (B.A., B.S.); University of Colorado Law School (LL.B.)

Fred M. Winner (April 8, 1912 – January 22, 2003) was a United States district judge of the United States District Court for the District of Colorado.

== Education and career ==
Born in Denver, Colorado, Winner received a Bachelor of Arts degree and a Bachelor of Science degree from the University of Colorado Boulder in 1933, and a Bachelor of Laws from the University of Colorado Law School in 1936. He was in private practice in Denver from 1936 to 1970, interrupted by service in the United States Navy during World War II, from 1942 to 1945.

=== Federal judicial service ===
On December 8, 1970, Winner was nominated by President Richard Nixon to a new seat on the United States District Court for the District of Colorado created by 84 Stat. 294. He was confirmed by the United States Senate on December 16, 1970, and received his commission on December 18, 1970. He served as Chief Judge from 1976 to 1982, assuming senior status on April 8, 1982. Winner served in that capacity until his retirement from the bench, on August 1, 1984.

== Death ==
Winner died on January 22, 2003, in Grand Junction, Colorado.

== Sources ==
Legal offices
| Preceded by Seat established by 84 Stat. 294 | Judge of the United States District Court for the District of Colorado; 1970–1982 | Succeeded by John Carbone Porfilio |
| Preceded by Alfred A. Arraj | Chief Judge of the United States District Court for the District of Colorado; 1976–1982 | Succeeded by Sherman Glenn Finesilver |
