= Manuel Ramos (writer) =

American lawyer and writer

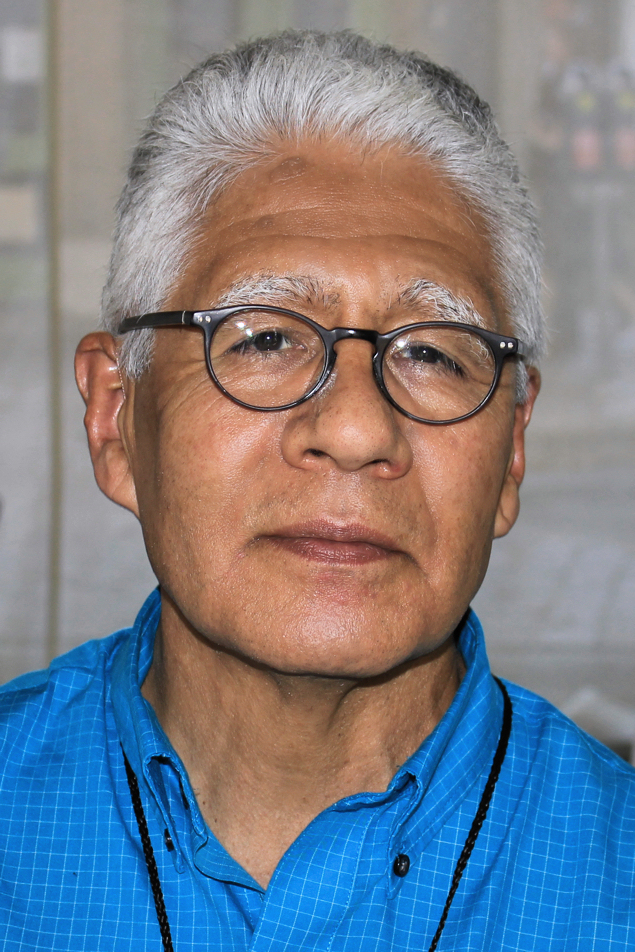
- Ramos at the 2015 Texas Book Festival
- Born: Florence, Colorado
- Occupation: Writer

Manuel Ramos, an attorney who also has taught Chicano literature courses at Metropolitan State University of Denver, is the author of several crime fiction novels.

== Biography ==
Manuel Ramos, a retired attorney and Colorado native, is the author of eleven novels and a short story collection. His fiction is often categorized as Chicano Noir, and his last four crime fiction novels are part of his Mile High Noir series. Manuel has received the Colorado Book Award (twice), the Chicano/Latino Literary Award, the Top Hand Award from the Colorado Authors League, and Honorable Mentions from the Latino International Book Awards. His first novel, The Ballad of Rocky Ruiz, was a finalist for the Edgar® award, and "My Bad: A Mile High Noir" was a Shamus Award finalist. He is a co-founder of and regular contributor to the award-winning Internet magazine La Bloga (www.labloga.blogspot.com), which deals with Latinx literature, culture, news and opinion.

=== Bibliography ===
- The Ballad of Rocky Ruiz (1993)
- The Ballad of Gato Guerrero (1994)
- The Last Client of Luis Montez (1996)
- Blues for the Buffalo (1997)
- Moony's Road to Hell (2002)
- Brown-On-Brown (2003)
- King of the Chicanos (2010)
- Desperado: A Mile High Noir (2013)
- The Skull of Pancho Villa and Other Stores (2015)
- My Bad: A Mile High Noir (2016)
- "The Golden Havana Night" (2018)
- "Angels in the Wind: A Mile High Noir" (2021)
