= Wiley Young Daniel =

American judge (1946–2019)

Senior Judge of the United States District Court for the District of Colorado
- In office January 1, 2013 – May 10, 2019

Chief Judge of the United States District Court for the District of Colorado
- In office 2008–2013
- Preceded by: Lewis Babcock
- Succeeded by: Marcia S. Krieger

Judge of the United States District Court for the District of Colorado
- In office June 30, 1995 – January 1, 2013
- Appointed by: Bill Clinton
- Preceded by: Sherman Glenn Finesilver
- Succeeded by: Raymond P. Moore

Personal details
- Born: September 10, 1946 Louisville, Kentucky
- Died: May 10, 2019 (aged 72) Denver, Colorado
- Education: Howard University (BA, JD)

Wiley Young Daniel (September 10, 1946 – May 10, 2019) was a United States district judge of the United States District Court for the District of Colorado.

== Early education and career ==
Born in Louisville, Kentucky, Daniel received a Bachelor of Arts degree from Howard University in 1968 and a Juris Doctor from Howard University School of Law in 1971. He was in private practice in Detroit, Michigan from 1971 to 1977, and was also a director of Wayne County Neighborhood Legal Services from 1974 to 1976, and an adjunct professor at the Detroit College of Law from 1974 to 1977. In 1977, he moved his private practice to Denver, Colorado, and became an adjunct professor at the University of Colorado School of Law, where he continued teaching until 1980. He was also a director of Colorado's Personnel Services Board from 1979 to 1983, and was a director and vice-chair of the Iliff School of Theology in 1983.

== Federal judicial service ==
On March 31, 1995, Daniel was nominated by President Bill Clinton to a seat on the United States District Court for the District of Colorado vacated by Sherman Glenn Finesilver. Daniel was confirmed by the United States Senate on June 30, 1995, and received his commission the same day. He served as chief judge from 2008 to 2013. He took senior status on January 1, 2013, and died on May 10, 2019.

== See also ==
- List of African-American federal judges
- List of African-American jurists
- List of first minority male lawyers and judges in Colorado

Legal offices
Preceded by Sherman Glenn Finesilver	Judge of the United States District Court for the District of Colorado; 1995–2013	Succeeded by Raymond P. Moore
Preceded by Lewis Babcock	Chief Judge of the United States District Court for the District of Colorado; 2008–2013	Succeeded by Marcia S. Krieger
