= Robert E. Blackburn =

American judge (born 1950)

Senior Judge of the United States District Court for the District of Colorado
- Incumbent
- Assumed office April 12, 2016

Judge of the United States District Court for the District of Colorado
- In office March 6, 2002 – April 12, 2016
- Appointed by: George W. Bush
- Preceded by: Zita Leeson Weinshienk
- Succeeded by: Daniel D. Domenico

Personal details
- Born: April 12, 1950 (age 76) Lakewood, Colorado, U.S.
- Education: Western State College of Colorado (BA); University of Colorado Law School (JD)

Robert Edward Blackburn (born April 12, 1950) is a senior United States district judge of the United States District Court for the District of Colorado.

== Early life and education ==
Blackburn was born in Lakewood, Colorado. He received a Bachelor of Arts degree from Western State College of Colorado in 1972. He received a Juris Doctor from the University of Colorado Law School in 1974.

== Career ==
Blackburn was in private practice in Las Animas, Colorado, from 1975 to 1980. He was a deputy district attorney of Sixteenth Judicial District Attorney's Office, Colorado from 1980 to 1986. He was a county attorney of Bent County, Colorado, from 1980 to 1988. He was a Municipal judge, Town of Kim, Colorado, from 1985 to 1988. He was a judge on the Sixteenth Judicial District of Colorado from 1988 to 2002.

=== Federal judicial service ===
Blackburn was nominated to be a United States district judge of the United States District Court for the District of Colorado by President George W. Bush on September 10, 2001, to a seat vacated by Zita Leeson Weinshienk. He was confirmed by the United States Senate on February 26, 2002, and received his commission on March 6, 2002. He assumed senior status on April 12, 2016.

== Jurisprudence in practice ==
=== Individual rights ===
Blackburn has argued that the Fifth Amendment protection from individuals being compelled to testifying against themselves does not apply to testimony which is required to decrypt a protected data source in order to provide prosecutors with evidence. He suggests that the convenience of prosecutors in acquiring evidence in this manner overrules the otherwise inalienable right to avoid being "compelled in any criminal case to be a witness against himself". Critics have argued that since the password to an encrypted data source is a part of the defendant's mind, compelled testimony to reveal it is a direct violation of the Fifth Amendment.

Legal offices
Preceded by Zita Leeson Weinshienk	Judge of the United States District Court for the District of Colorado; 2002–2016	Succeeded by Daniel D. Domenico
