= United States District Court for the District of Colorado =

U.S. federal district court in Colorado

- (D. Colo.)
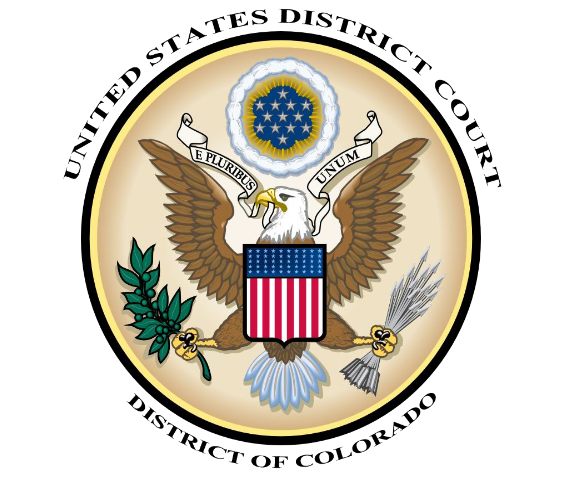
- Location: Denver More locations: Byron G. Rogers Federal Building and U.S. Courthouse (Denver); Colorado Springs; Grand Junction; Durango; Boulder; Montrose; Pueblo; Sterling
- Appeals to: Tenth Circuit
- Established: June 26, 1876
- Judges: 7
- Chief Judge: Regina M. Rodriguez

Officers of the court
- U.S. Attorney: Peter McNeilly
- U.S. Marshal: Kirk M. Taylor
- www.cod.uscourts.gov

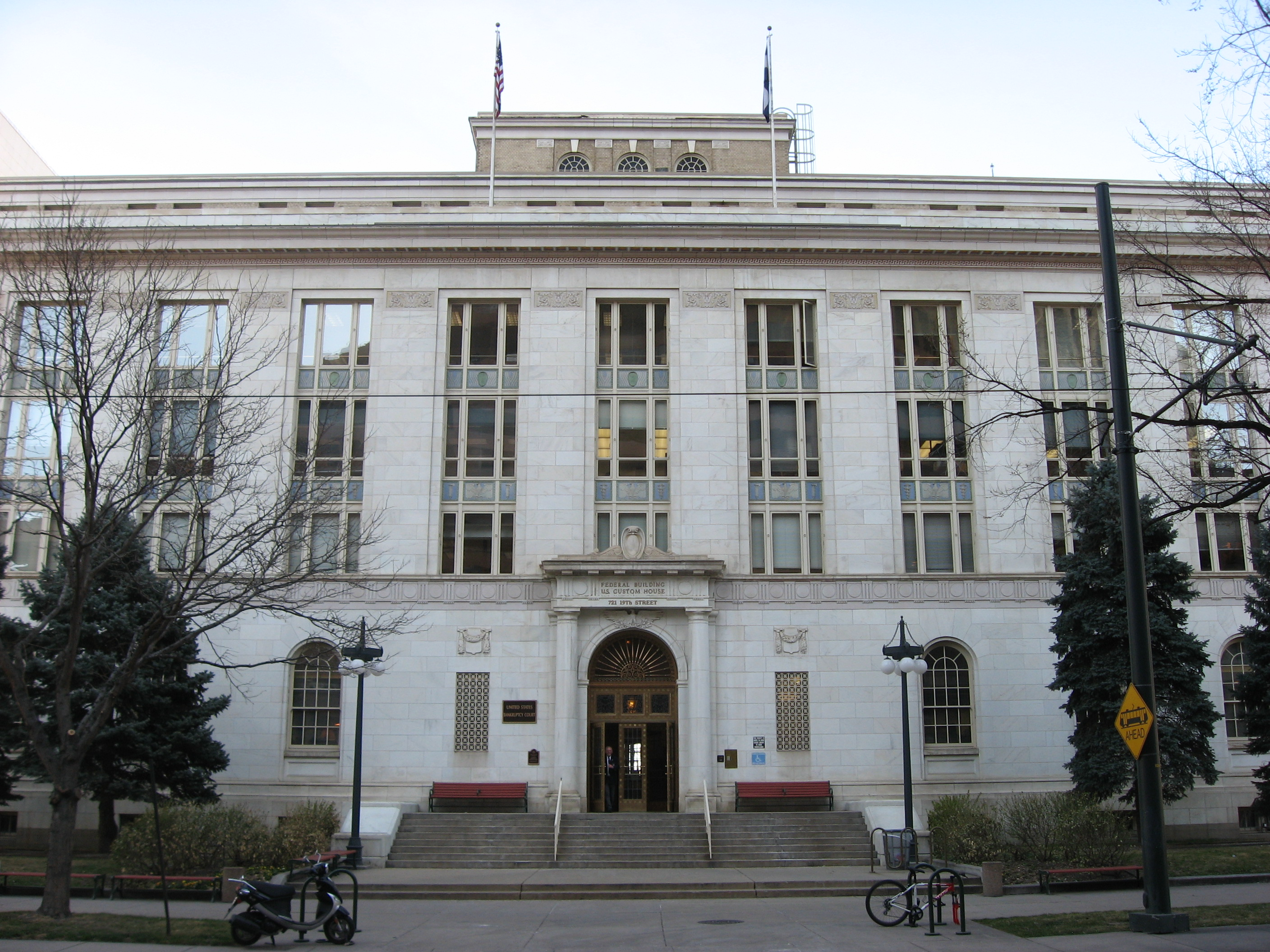
U.S. Customhouse

The United States District Court for the District of Colorado (in case citations, D. Colo. or D. Col.) is a federal court in the Tenth Circuit (except for patent claims and claims against the U.S. government under the Tucker Act, which are appealed to the Federal Circuit).

The District was established on June 26, 1876, pending Colorado statehood on August 1, 1876.

As of June 15, 2025, the United States attorney for the District is Peter McNeilly.

== Organization of the court ==
The United States District Court for the District of Colorado is the sole federal judicial district in Colorado. Court for the District is held at Colorado Springs, Denver, Durango, and Grand Junction.

== Current judges ==
As of October 8, 2026:

#	Title	Judge	Duty station	Born	Term of service			Appointed by
#	Title	Judge	Duty station	Born	Active	Chief	Senior	Appointed by
30	Chief Judge	Regina M. Rodriguez	Denver	1963	2021–present	2026–present	—	Biden
24	District Judge	Philip A. Brimmer	Denver	1959	2008–present	2019–2026	—	G.W. Bush
29	District Judge	Daniel D. Domenico	Denver	1972	2019–present	2026	—	Trump
31	District Judge	Charlotte Sweeney	Denver	1969	2022–present	—	—	Biden
32	District Judge	Nina Y. Wang	Denver	1972	2022–present	—	—	Biden
33	District Judge	Gordon Gallagher	Grand Junction	1970	2023–present	—	—	Biden
34	District Judge	Kato Crews	Denver	1975	2024–present	—	—	Biden
12	Senior Judge	John L. Kane Jr.	Denver	1937	1977–1988	—	1988–present	Carter
16	Senior Judge	Lewis Babcock	Denver	1943	1988–2008	2000–2007	2008–present	Reagan
21	Senior Judge	Marcia S. Krieger	Denver	1954	2002–2019	2013–2019	2019–present	G.W. Bush
22	Senior Judge	Robert E. Blackburn	Denver	1950	2002–2016	—	2016–present	G.W. Bush
25	Senior Judge	Christine Arguello	Denver	1955	2008–2022	—	2022–present	G.W. Bush
26	Senior Judge	William J. Martínez	Denver	1954	2010–2023	—	2023–present	Obama
27	Senior Judge	R. Brooke Jackson	Denver	1947	2011–2021	—	2021–present	Obama
28	Senior Judge	Raymond P. Moore	Denver	1953	2013–2023	—	2023–present	Obama

== Vacancies and pending nominations ==
Seat	Prior judge's duty station	Seat last held by	Vacancy reason	Date of vacancy	Nominee	Date of nomination
6	Denver	Daniel D. Domenico	Elevation	TBD	–	–

== Former judges ==
#	Judge	Born–died	Active service	Chief Judge	Senior status	Appointed by	Reason for termination
1	Moses Hallett	1834–1913	1877–1906	—	—	Grant	retirement
2	Robert E. Lewis	1857–1941	1906–1921	—	—	T. Roosevelt	elevation
3	John Foster Symes	1878–1951	1922–1950	—	1950–1951	Harding	death
4	William Lee Knous	1889–1959	1950–1959	1954–1959	—	Truman	death
5	Jean Sala Breitenstein	1900–1986	1954–1957	—	—	Eisenhower	elevation
6	Alfred A. Arraj	1906–1992	1957–1976	1959–1976	1976–1992	Eisenhower	death
7	Olin Hatfield Chilson	1903–1991	1960–1973	—	1973–1991	Eisenhower	death
8	William Edward Doyle	1911–1986	1961–1971	—	—	Kennedy	elevation
9	Fred M. Winner	1912–2003	1970–1982	1976–1982	1982–1984	Nixon	retirement
10	Sherman Glenn Finesilver	1927–2006	1971–1994	1982–1994	1994	Nixon	retirement
11	Richard Paul Matsch	1930–2019	1974–2003	1994–2000	2003–2019	Nixon	death
13	Jim Carrigan	1929–2014	1979–1994	—	1994–1995	Carter	retirement
14	Zita Leeson Weinshienk	1933–2022	1979–1998	—	1998–2011	Carter	retirement
15	John Carbone Porfilio	1934–present	1982–1985	—	—	Reagan	elevation
17	Edward Nottingham	1948–present	1989–2008	2007–2008	—	G.H.W. Bush	resignation
18	Daniel B. Sparr	1931–2006	1990–2001	—	2001–2006	G.H.W. Bush	death
19	Wiley Young Daniel	1946–2019	1995–2013	2008–2013	2013–2019	Clinton	death
20	Walker David Miller	1939–2013	1996–2008	—	2008–2013	Clinton	death
23	Phillip S. Figa	1951–2008	2003–2008	—	—	G.W. Bush	death

== Chief judges ==
Chief judges have administrative responsibilities with respect to their district court. Unlike the Supreme Court, where one justice is specifically nominated to be chief, the office of chief judge rotates among the district court judges. To be chief, a judge must have been in active service on the court for at least one year, be under the age of 65, and have not previously served as chief judge.

A vacancy is filled by the judge highest in seniority among the group of qualified judges. The chief judge serves for a term of seven years, or until age 70, whichever occurs first. The age restrictions are waived if no members of the court would otherwise be qualified for the position.

When the office was created in 1948, the chief judge was the longest-serving judge who had not elected to retire, on what has since 1958 been known as senior status, or declined to serve as chief judge. After August 6, 1959, judges could not become or remain chief after turning 70 years old. The current rules have been in operation since October 1, 1982.

== Succession of seats ==
Seat 1
Seat established on August 1, 1876 by 19 Stat. 61
Hallett	1877–1906
Lewis	1906–1921
Symes	1922–1950
Knous	1950–1959
Chilson	1960–1973
Matsch	1974–2003
Figa	2003–2008
Jackson	2011–2021
Sweeney	2022–present

Seat 2
Seat established on February 10, 1954 by 68 Stat. 8
Breitenstein	1954–1957
Arraj	1957–1976
Kane, Jr.	1977–1988
Babcock	1988–2008
Brimmer	2008–present

Seat 3
Seat established on May 19, 1961 by 75 Stat. 80
Doyle	1961–1971
Finesilver	1971–1994
Daniel	1995–2013
Moore	2013–2023
Crews	2024–present

Seat 4
Seat established on June 2, 1970 by 84 Stat. 294
Winner	1970–1982
Porfilio	1982–1985
Sparr	1990–2001
Krieger	2002–2019
Rodriguez	2021–present

Seat 5
Seat established on October 20, 1978 by 92 Stat. 1629
Carrigan	1979–1994
Miller	1996–2008
Arguello	2008–2022
Wang	2022–present

Seat 6
Seat established on October 20, 1978 by 92 Stat. 1629
Weinshienk	1979–1998
Blackburn	2002–2016
Domenico	2019–present

Seat 7
Seat established on July 10, 1984 by 98 Stat. 333
Nottingham, Jr.	1989–2008
Martínez	2010–2023
Gallagher	2023–present

== U.S. Attorney ==
- Theodore D. Edwards 1861
- James E. Dalliba 1861
- Samuel E. Brown 1862
- Lewis C. Rockwell 1870-73
- H. C. Alleman 1873-75
- Charles D. Bradley 1875-77
- W. S. Decker 1877-80
- Edward S. Johnson 1880-82
- Andrew W. Brazee 1882-85
- Henry W. Hobson 1885-89
- John D. Fleming 1889-93
- Henry V. Johnson 1893-97
- Greeley W. Whitford 1897-1901
- Earl M. Cranston 1901-08
- Thomas Ward, Jr. 1908-12
- Harry E. Kelly 1912-14
- Harry B. Tedrow 1914-21
- John Foster Symes 1921-22
- Granby Hillyer 1922-24
- George Stephan 1924-29
- Ralph L. Carr 1929-33
- Thomas J. Morrissey 1933-47
- Ivor Wingren 1947
- Max M. Bulkeley 1947-51
- Charles S. Vigil 1951-53
- Donald E. Kelley 1953-58
- Robert S. Wham 1958-59
- Donald G. Brotzman 1959-61
- Lawrence M. Henry 1961-69
- James L. Treece 1969-77
- Cathlin Donnell 1977
- Joseph F. Dolan 1977-81
- Robert N. Miller 1981-88
- Michael J. Norton 1988-93
- James R. Allison 1993
- Henry Lawrence Solano 1993-98
- Linda A. McMahan 1998-1999?
- Tom Strickland 1999-2001
- John Suthers 2001-2005
- Troy A. Eid 2006-2009
- David Gaouette (acting) 2009-2010
- John F. Walsh 2010-2016
- Robert Troyer 2016-2018
- Jason R. Dunn 2018-2021
- Matthew T. Kirsch (acting) 2021
- Cole Finegan 2021–2024
- Matthew T. Kirsch (acting) 2024–2025
- Peter McNeilly 2025-Present

== See also ==
- Courts of Colorado
- List of current United States district judges
- List of United States federal courthouses in Colorado
