= Byron G. Rogers Federal Building and United States Courthouse =

Historic courthouse in Denver, Colorado

Coordinates: 39°44′59″N 104°59′20″W

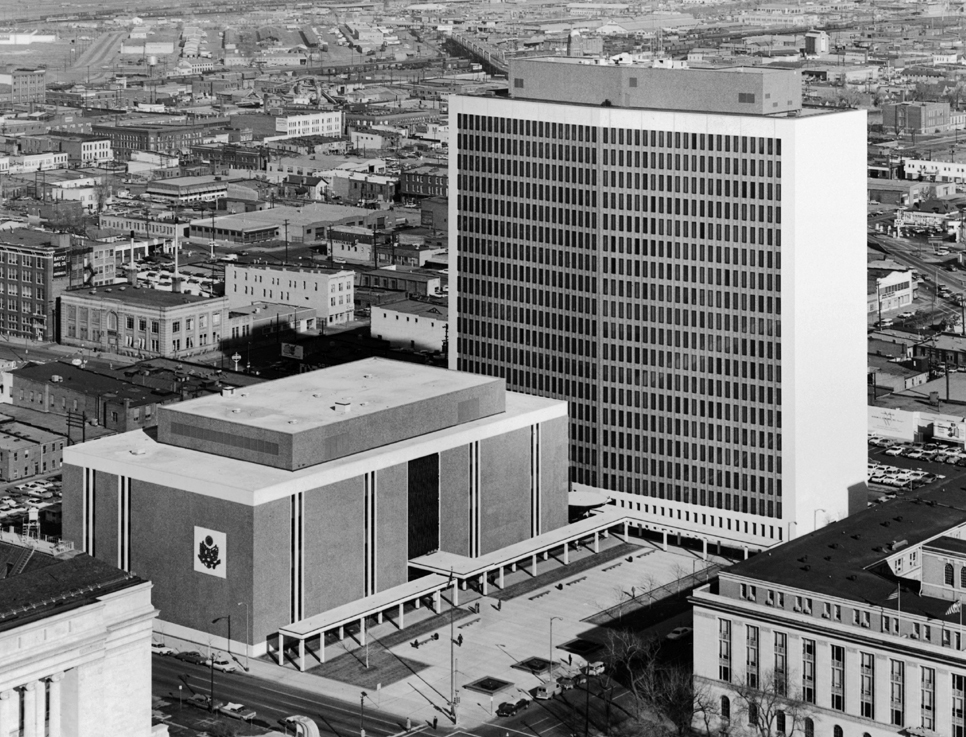
The Byron G. Rogers Federal Building and United States Courthouse

The Byron G. Rogers Federal Building and U.S. Courthouse is a historic building on Stout Street in downtown Denver, Colorado, which serves as a courthouse of the United States District Court for the District of Colorado. Completed in 1965, the building was renamed for Colorado Congressman Byron G. Rogers in 1984. In 1996 and 1997, the criminal case against bomber Timothy McVeigh was conducted there. Additionally, the federal building is home to 11 federal agencies, including the United States Patent and Trademark Office's new Rocky Mountain Regional location that opened on June 30, 2014. The building was listed on the National Register of Historic Places in 2016.

== Building history ==
In the years following World War II, the population of Denver, Colorado, grew rapidly as numerous federal agencies located to the city. The existing federal building could no longer accommodate growing space needs, and the government began planning for a new complex to house the United States District Court and the United States Court of Appeals for the Tenth Circuit. In 1959, the U.S. General Services Administration (GSA) selected the accomplished Denver architectural firm James Sudler Associates as the lead designer, with another skilled Denver firm, Fisher & Davis, assisting. James Sudler designed numerous Modern buildings in the Denver area, including the exuberant Church of the Risen Christ and the Denver Art Museum (with Gio Ponti).

In 1961, the federal government allotted $687,000 to purchase the downtown Denver site, bound by Champa, Stout, Nineteenth, and Twentieth streets, adjacent to the existing post office and custom house. Officials appropriated an additional $20 million in 1962 for the construction of the complex, with groundbreaking occurring the same year. The first occupants moved into the building in 1965. In 1984, the complex was named to honor Byron G. Rogers (1900–1983), who represented Colorado in the U.S. House of Representatives from 1951 to 1971. Rogers was instrumental in securing the original funds for the courthouse.

The trial of Timothy McVeigh, the bomber responsible for the 1995 attack on the Alfred P. Murrah Federal Building in Oklahoma City, was held at the courthouse in 1996 and 1997. To find an impartial jury, the court moved the case to Denver, where McVeigh was tried and convicted.

In 1999, GSA initiated alterations to the entrance to accommodate security needs. Local preservationists asked GSA to consider the potential significance of the complex before commencing work that would alter character-defining features. As a result, GSA developed a sensitive design that retained these important elements. The unexpected public interest led GSA to commission a study to better understand the architecture and context of buildings from this era. In 2003, GSA published Growth, Efficiency, and Modernism: GSA Buildings of the 1950s, 60s, and 70s. The publication has received several awards and strengthened GSA's reputation as a leader in the preservation field.

== Architecture ==
The courthouse consists of three distinct components: an 18-story office tower, a low courthouse, and a landscaped plaza. This three-part design combination was typical of Modern architecture and is perhaps best exemplified by the United Nations Headquarters complex in New York. Sudler's design for the Byron G. Rogers Federal Building and U.S. Courthouse is an excellent example of Formalism, a style of Modern architecture that incorporates flat rooflines, columnar supports, symmetry, high-quality materials, and works of art.

The tall office building has an unusual, angular footprint. While the center sections measure 103 feet in width, the ends are only 80 feet wide. The street level is clad in white marble panels, as are the narrow unfenestrated elevations of the building. Upper stories of the primary elevations exhibit an alternating rhythm of beige pre-cast concrete panels and projecting windows. Public spaces on the interior have marble wainscoting and terrazzo floors with bronze dividers. The low, rectangular courthouse derives its form from two nearby federal buildings that inspired Sudler: the 1931 U.S. Custom House and the 1916 Byron R. White United States Courthouse (the former main post office). Sudler's design alludes to earlier classical architecture in scale, form, and color of materials. The building is clad primarily in pre-cast aggregate stone panels with a light tan color. On the Champa Street elevation, the panels have profiles that evoke the footprint and windows of the office tower. White marble is visible in bands at the top and bottom of the courthouse. Windows are oriented vertically and in pairs, running in tall bands divided by thin strips of marble. The Stout Street elevation features a metal art screen, a common element of Formalism, over large windows; the screen also serves to control direct sunlight on the interior. Like the office tower, interior public spaces of the courthouse have marble wainscoting and terrazzo floors. The courtroom walls are finished in panels of alternating polished light and dark woods with prominent grain patterns.

Public art is a critical component of the complex. GSA allotted $50,000 of the original construction budget for works of art. Pieces include the large bronze Great Seal of the United States and a stylized mahogany carving called Justice, Freedom, and the Release from Bondage, both by Denver sculptor William Joseph. A bronze bas-relief art column entitled Federal Services by Edgar Britton is located within the landscaped plaza. The column resembles a totem pole and contains carvings inspired by Native American art. The cylinder originally acted as a canopy support, but was moved when the entrance was reconfigured. In 2006, Jim Campbell created a dynamic light installation along the Champa Street elevation, with a companion piece in the main lobby.

In 1999, GSA initiated a $1.65 million project as part of its First Impressions program. The plaza and entrance configuration were modified to improve security screening and make the facility more efficient and welcoming to employees and visitors. The inviting new plaza skillfully and unobtrusively incorporates security features as well as elements of the architects' design that were never constructed. The existing covered walkway, or canopy, was retained and a new glass pavilion was added at the convergence of the office tower and the courthouse to facilitate security screening. New lighting and a restored water feature were also included in the design. The project received a Standing Ovation Award from Historic Denver, Inc., in 2001 and a 2006 Honor Award from the Denver Chapter of the American Institute of Architects.

The low courthouse building underwent a full modernization between 2002 and 2006. The project included upgrades to mechanical systems, reconfiguration of interior spaces, and asbestos abatement.

== Significant events ==
- 1959: Architects James Sudler Associates and Fisher & Davis retained
- 1962: Construction begins
- 1965: Construction completed
- 1966: Building dedicated
- 1984: Building named to honor Byron G. Rogers
- 1996-1997: Oklahoma City bomber Timothy McVeigh tried and convicted
- 1999-2001: GSA initiates First Impressions project
- 2002-2006: Courthouse renovated

== Building facts ==
- 1961 Stout Street
- Architects: James Sudler Associates; Fisher & Davis
- Construction Dates: 1962–1965
- Architectural Style: Formalism
- Primary Materials: Marble and pre-cast concrete panels
- Prominent Features: 18-story tower; Low courthouse; Public art; Landscaped plaza

== See also ==
- National Register of Historic Places listings in Downtown Denver, Colorado
