= Alfred A. Arraj =

American judge (1906–1992)

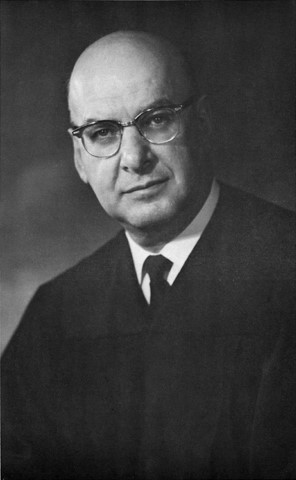

Senior Judge of the United States District Court for the District of Colorado
- In office August 31, 1976 – October 23, 1992

Chief Judge of the United States District Court for the District of Colorado
- In office 1959–1976
- Preceded by: William Lee Knous
- Succeeded by: Fred M. Winner

Judge of the United States District Court for the District of Colorado
- In office August 6, 1957 – August 31, 1976
- Appointed by: Dwight D. Eisenhower
- Preceded by: Jean Sala Breitenstein
- Succeeded by: John L. Kane Jr.

Personal details
- Born: Alfred Albert Arraj; September 1, 1906 Kansas City, Missouri, U.S.
- Died: October 23, 1992 (aged 86) Denver, Colorado, U.S.
- Education: University of Colorado Law School (LLB)

Alfred Albert Arraj (September 1, 1906 – October 23, 1992) was a United States district judge of the United States District Court for the District of Colorado.

== Early life ==
Arra was born on September 1, 1906 in Kansas City, Missouri. He received a Bachelor of Laws from the University of Colorado Law School in 1928.

== Career ==
He was in private practice in Denver, Colorado, from 1928 to 1929, in Springfield, Colorado, from 1929 to 1933, back in Denver from 1934 to 1936, and again in Springfield from 1936 to 1942. He was a major in the United States Army during World War II, from 1942 to 1946, thereafter returning to his Springfield practice until 1949.

He was a District Judge of the 15th Judicial District of Colorado from 1949 to 1957. On July 2, 1957, Arraj was nominated by President Dwight D. Eisenhower to a seat on the United States District Court for the District of Colorado vacated by Judge Jean Sala Breitenstein. Arraj was confirmed by the United States Senate on August 5, 1957, and received his commission on August 6, 1957. He served as chief judge from 1959 to 1976.

He was a member of the Judicial Conference of the United States from 1964 to 1967, and a board member of the Federal Judicial Center from 1974 to 1976. He assumed senior status on August 31, 1976, and served in that capacity until his death.

== Honors ==
The federal courthouse in Denver is named after Arraj.

== Personal life ==
Arra died on October 23, 1992, in Denver, Colorado.

Legal offices
Preceded by Jean Sala Breitenstein	Judge of the United States District Court for the District of Colorado; 1957–1976	Succeeded by John L. Kane Jr.
Preceded by William Lee Knous	Chief Judge of the United States District Court for the District of Colorado; 1959–1976	Succeeded by Fred M. Winner
