= Homer Bedford =

American politician (1880–1968)

Treasurer of Colorado
- In office January 8, 1963 – January 10, 1967
- Governor: John Arthur Love
- Preceded by: Timothy H. Armstrong
- Succeeded by: Virginia Neal Blue
- In office January 8, 1957 – January 13, 1959
- Governor: Stephen McNichols
- Preceded by: Earl E. Ewing
- Succeeded by: Timothy H. Armstrong
- In office January 13, 1953 – January 11, 1955
- Governor: Daniel I. J. Thornton
- Preceded by: Earl E. Ewing
- Succeeded by: Earl E. Ewing
- In office January 11, 1949 – January 9, 1951
- Governor: William Lee Knous; Walter Walford Johnson
- Preceded by: H. Rodney Anderson
- Succeeded by: Earl E. Ewing
- In office January 9, 1945 – January 14, 1947
- Governor: John Charles Vivian
- Preceded by: Leon Lavington
- Succeeded by: H. Rodney Anderson
- In office January 14, 1941 – January 12, 1943
- Governor: Ralph Lawrence Carr
- Preceded by: Charles M. Armstrong
- Succeeded by: Leon Lavington
- In office January 12, 1937 – January 10, 1939
- Governor: Teller Ammons
- Preceded by: Charles M. Armstrong
- Succeeded by: Charles M. Armstrong
- In office January 10, 1933 – January 8, 1935
- Governor: Edwin C. Johnson
- Preceded by: John M. Jackson
- Succeeded by: Charles M. Armstrong

Auditor of Colorado
- In office January 13, 1959 – January 8, 1963
- Governor: Stephen McNichols
- Preceded by: Earl E. Ewing
- Succeeded by: John P. Proctor
- In office January 11, 1955 – January 8, 1957
- Governor: Edwin C. Johnson
- Preceded by: Earl E. Ewing
- Succeeded by: Earl E. Ewing
- In office January 9, 1951 – January 13, 1953
- Governor: Daniel I. J. Thornton
- Preceded by: Myron C. McGinley
- Succeeded by: Earl E. Ewing
- In office January 14, 1947 – January 11, 1949
- Governor: William Lee Knous
- Preceded by: Leon Lavington
- Succeeded by: Myron C. McGinley
- In office January 10, 1939 – January 14, 1941
- Governor: Ralph Lawrence Carr
- Preceded by: Thomas W. Annear
- Succeeded by: Charles M. Armstrong
- In office January 8, 1935 – January 12, 1937
- Governor: Edwin C. Johnson; Ray Herbert Talbot
- Preceded by: Benjamin F. Stapleton
- Succeeded by: Thomas W. Annear

Personal details
- Born: March 16, 1880 Balltown, Missouri
- Died: March 26, 1968 (aged 88) Englewood, Colorado
- Party: Democratic

Homer Bedford (March 16, 1880 – March 26, 1968) was an American politician who served as the Treasurer of Colorado from 1933 to 1935, 1937 to 1939, 1941 to 1943, 1945 to 1947, 1949 to 1951, 1953 to 1955, 1957 to 1959 and from 1963 to 1967. He served as the Auditor of Colorado from 1935 to 1937, 1939 to 1941, 1947 to 1949, 1951 to 1953, 1955 to 1957 and from 1959 to 1963.

Party political offices
Preceded by George E. Saunders	Democratic nominee for Governor of Colorado; 1942	Succeeded by Roy Best
