= 1942 Colorado gubernatorial election =

- November 3, 1942
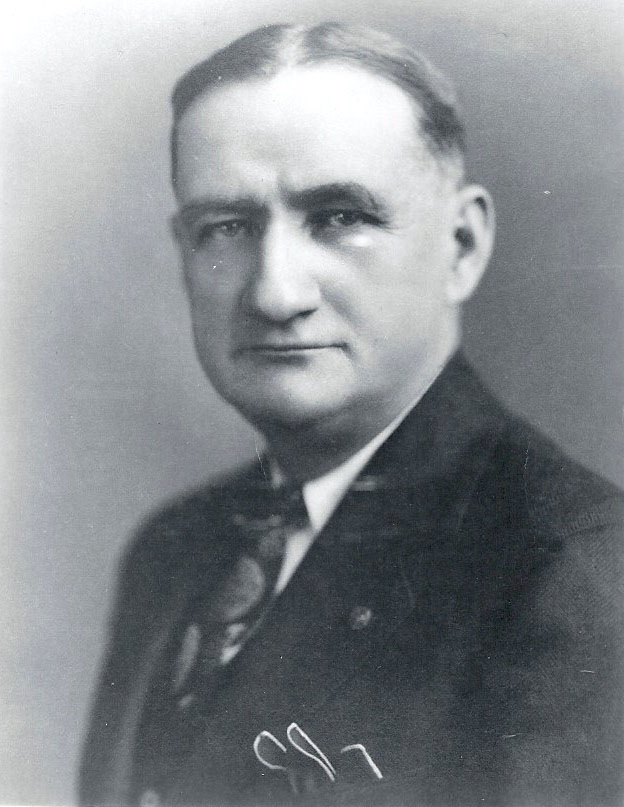

Nominee	John Charles Vivian	Homer Bedford
Party	Republican	Democratic
Popular vote	193,501	149,402
Percentage	56.23%	43.41%
- County results Vivian: 50–60% 60–70% 70–80% Bedford: 50–60% 60–70%
Governor before election
Ralph Lawrence Carr
Republican
Elected Governor
John Charles Vivian
Republican

The 1942 Colorado gubernatorial election was held on November 3, 1942. Republican nominee John Charles Vivian defeated Democratic nominee Homer Bedford with 56.23% of the vote.

== Primary elections ==
Primary elections were held on September 8, 1942.

=== Democratic primary ===
==== Candidates ====
- Homer Bedford, Colorado State Treasurer
- Moses E. Smith, State Representative
- William Lee Knous, Justice of the Colorado Supreme Court

==== Results ====
Democratic primary results
Party	Candidate	Votes	%
Democratic	Homer Bedford	25,828	40.2%
Democratic	Moses E. Smith	21,530	33.5%
Democratic	William Lee Knous	16,936	26.3%
Total votes		64,294	

=== Republican primary ===
==== Candidates ====
- John Charles Vivian, incumbent Lieutenant Governor
- Charles M. Armstrong, former Secretary of State of Colorado

==== Results ====
Republican primary results
Party	Candidate	Votes	%
Republican	John Charles Vivian	27,021	55.8%
Republican	Charles M. Armstrong	21,371	44.2%
Total votes		48,392	

== General election ==
=== Candidates ===
Major party candidates

- John Charles Vivian, Republican
- Homer Bedford, Democratic

Other candidates

- William R. Dietrich, Communist

=== Results ===
1942 Colorado gubernatorial election
Party	Candidate	Votes	%	±%
Republican	John Charles Vivian	193,501	56.23%	+1.86%
Democratic	Homer Bedford	149,402	43.41%	−1.55%
Communist	William R. Dietrich	1,232	0.36%	
Majority		44,099	12.82%	
Turnout		344,135		
Republican hold		Swing		
