= Brooke Jackson =

Brooke Jackson may refer to:

- R. Brooke Jackson (born 1947), senior United States district judge
- Brooke Jackson-Glidden (born 1990s), American food writer
