= Roy Best (prison warden) =

American prison warden and actor

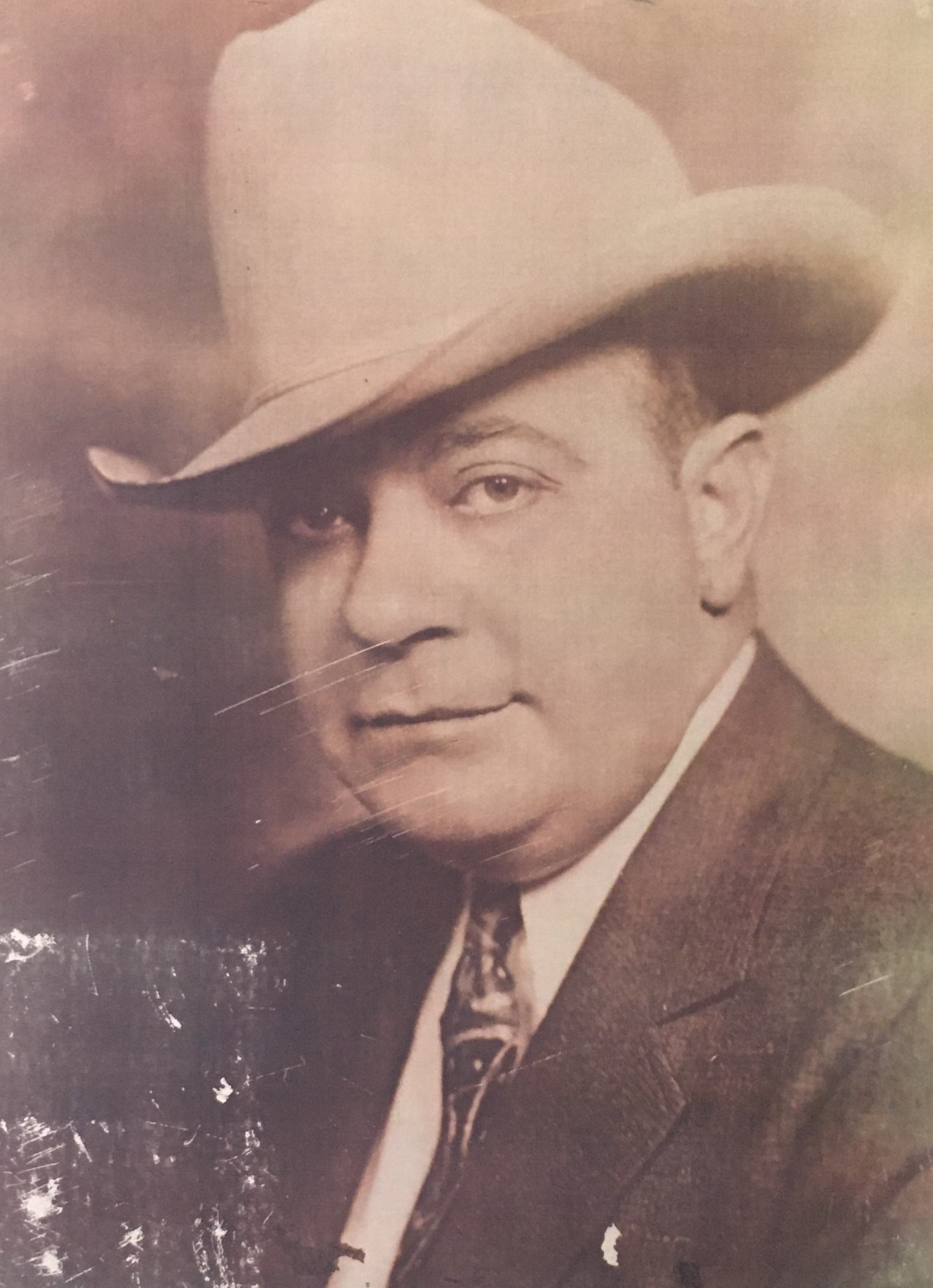
- Born: March 2, 1900; Rocky Ford, Colorado, U.S.
- Died: May 27, 1954 (aged 54); Cañon City, Colorado, U.S.
- Occupation: Prison warden
- Known for: Self-portrayal in Canon City; 1944 Colorado gubernatorial election

Roy Phelix Best (March 2, 1900 – May 27, 1954) was an American prison warden, film actor, and political candidate for Governor of Colorado. He is known for his wardenship of the Colorado Territorial Correctional Facility, an infamous prison in Cañon City, Colorado, (Note: Canon City in Colorado has been officially named Cañon City since 1994.) and for playing himself in Canon City, a 1948 film noir crime film.

== Early life ==
Roy Phelix Best was born on March 2, 1900, in Rocky Ford, Colorado, to parents Boon and Carrie Blakely Best. Colorado Governor William H. Adams appointed Roy's father Boon as warden of the Colorado Territorial Correctional Facility (CTCF) in Canon City. Adams later appointed Roy as warden of the same facility, making them the first father and son appointed warden by the same governor.

== Wardenship ==
Governor Adams appointed Best as warden at CTCF in 1932, when Best was 32 years old. This made Best the youngest warden in the history of the state and federal prison systems at that time.

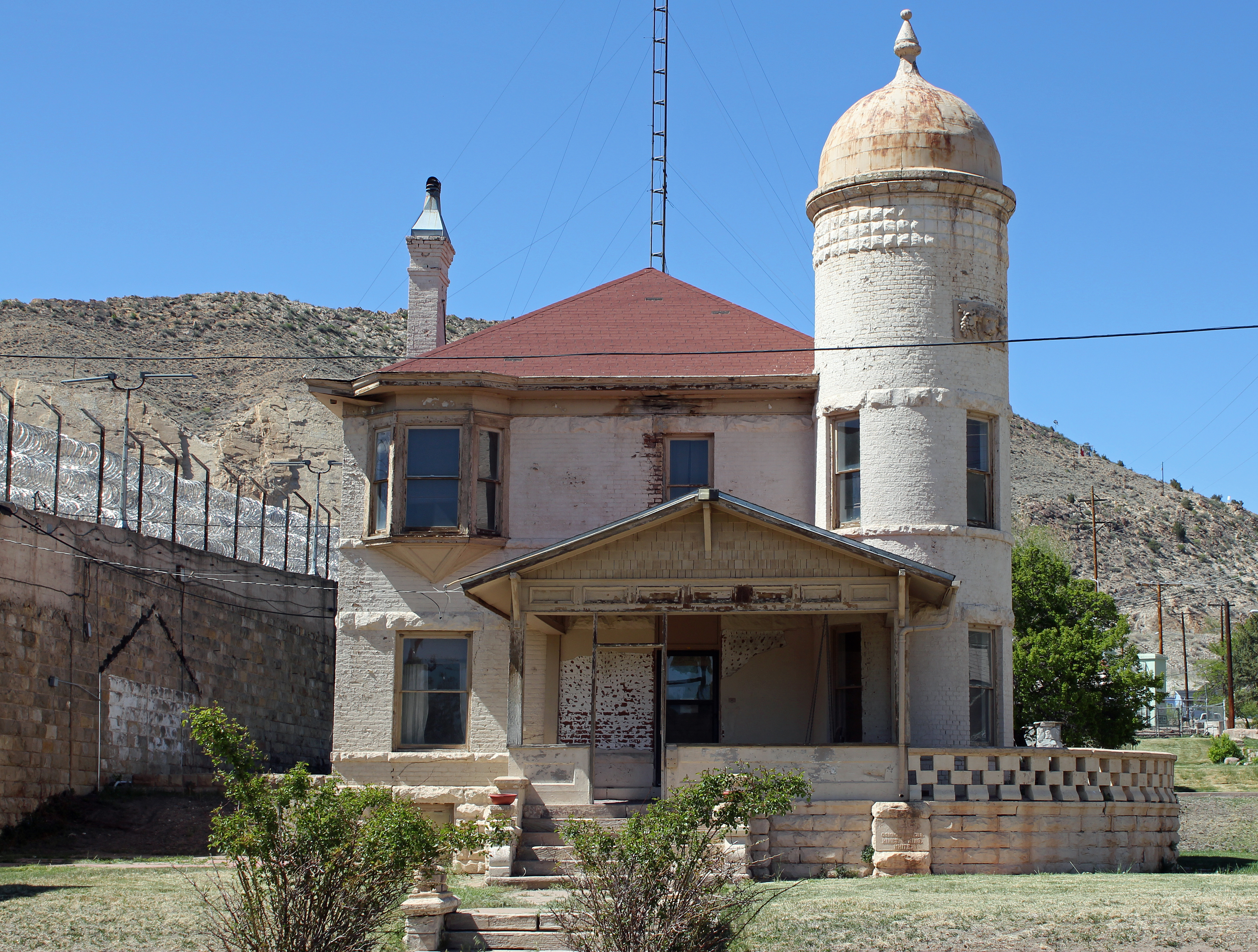
Portions of the Colorado Territorial Correctional Facility, with the Deputy Warden's House in the foreground and the prison walls in the background.

Best quickly earned a reputation as "the most notorious" warden in Colorado history. A strict disciplinarian, Best used painful and degrading punishments inside and outside prison walls. Among these was the "Old Gray Mare", a wooden saw-horse on which inmates were bent-over, tied-down, and "flogged with a leather strap". Although Best used the mare as a means of punishment and deterrence, the device would later play a central role in the controversy that led to his removal.

Homosexual prisoners were specifically punished. Early in Best's tenure, male prisoners caught engaging in homosexual activity "were forced to wear dresses and push a wheelbarrow filled with rocks as their punishment." A 1935 photograph documents the practice.

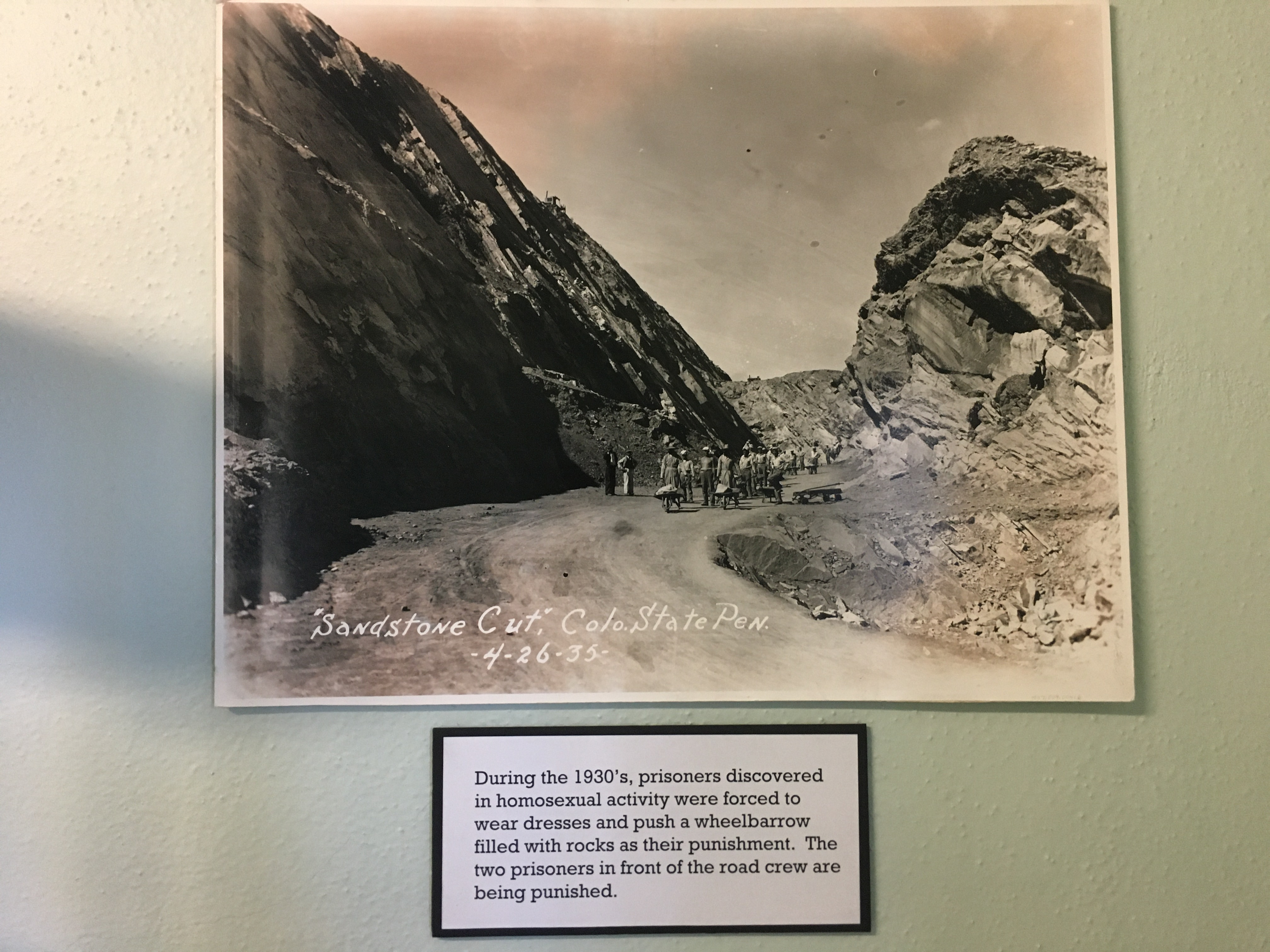
In 1935, prisoners caught engaging in homosexual activity were forced to wear dresses and push rocks.

However, Best also pioneered modern rehabilitative phenological practices. He opened ranches, workshops, gardens, and other facilities to keep inmates busy, provide them with skills to earn a living upon release, and reduce the prison's operating costs. Best also separated female and male prisoners, implemented a dental care program, and took young and developmentally-disabled inmates, such as Joe Arridy, under his wing.

Best's defenders preferred to focus on these rehabilitative efforts. "Many were led to believe that [Best] was unduly harsh and inhumane," wrote The Steamboat Pilot upon his death, "[b]ut for those who knew him...he was an efficient operator of an institution that was difficult to handle."

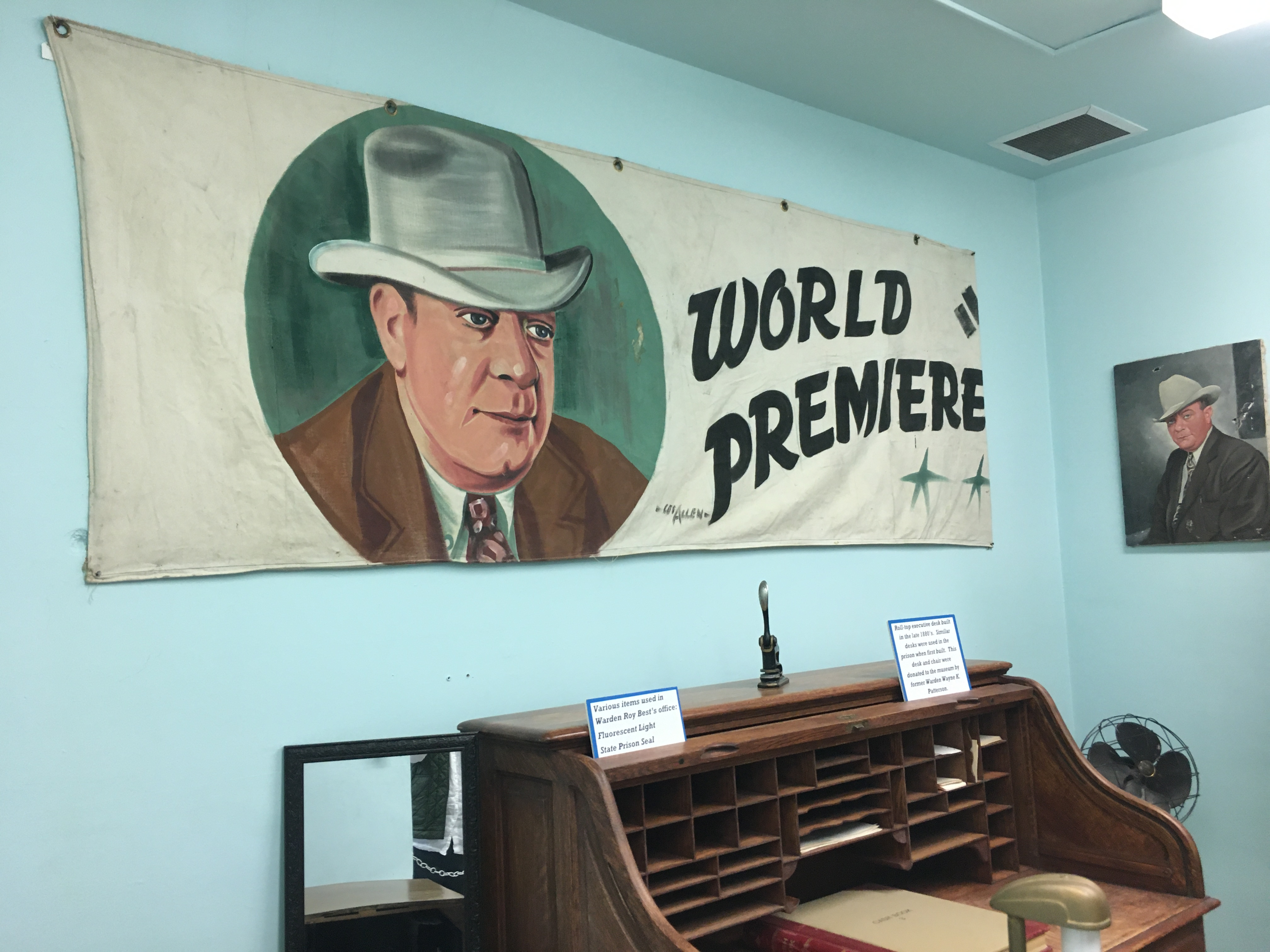
Roy Best's office memorabilia, including a banner from the Canon City premiere, on display at the Colorado Prison Museum.

== Film career ==
On December 30, 1947, twelve inmates escaped Best's prison in the middle of a snowstorm just before New Year's Eve. Best organized a search party, and successfully captured or killed all the escapees, "with most of the survivors suffering some degree of frostbite."

Hollywood wasted no time capitalizing on the dramatic events. Just months later, director Crane Wilbur, actors Scott Brady, Jeff Corey, and Whit Bissell, and a film crew arrived at Best's prison gates to recreate the escape for the silver screen. The result was Canon City, a film noir crime film shot almost entirely on location and in the Royal Gorge area.

Best played himself in the film. Throughout the film, Best can be seen inspecting the prison, explaining his duties, and coordinating the search efforts—all while wearing his Stetson, with his two Dobermans, Chris and Ike, by his side. The New York Times effusively praised Best's acting skills, writing that his performance evoked "a naturalness few actors could stimulate."

== Political career ==
Even before the release of Canon City, Best was quick to capitalize on his new-found notoriety as warden of Colorado's state penitentiary. Best ran unopposed in the 1944 Democratic primary for Governor of Colorado, earning over 34,000 votes. He proceeded to narrowly lose to Republican John Charles Vivian in the general election.

== Controversy and death ==
By the early 1950s, word of Best's floggings had reached the public and spurred significant backlash. In response, Governor Daniel I. J. Thornton launched an investigation and called for Best's removal. A federal indictment followed, and Best faced a trial for violating his prisoners’ constitutional rights, among other charges.

Although the jury ultimately acquitted Best, the attention spurred a separate civil service inquest, which found that Best mixed his personal financial affairs with those of the prison. He received a two-year suspension from his duties as a warden of two decades.

Best died from a heart attack on May 27, 1954, just three days short of the lifting of his suspension, and was buried at Lakeside Cemetery in Cañon City, just two miles from the prison.

== Legacy ==
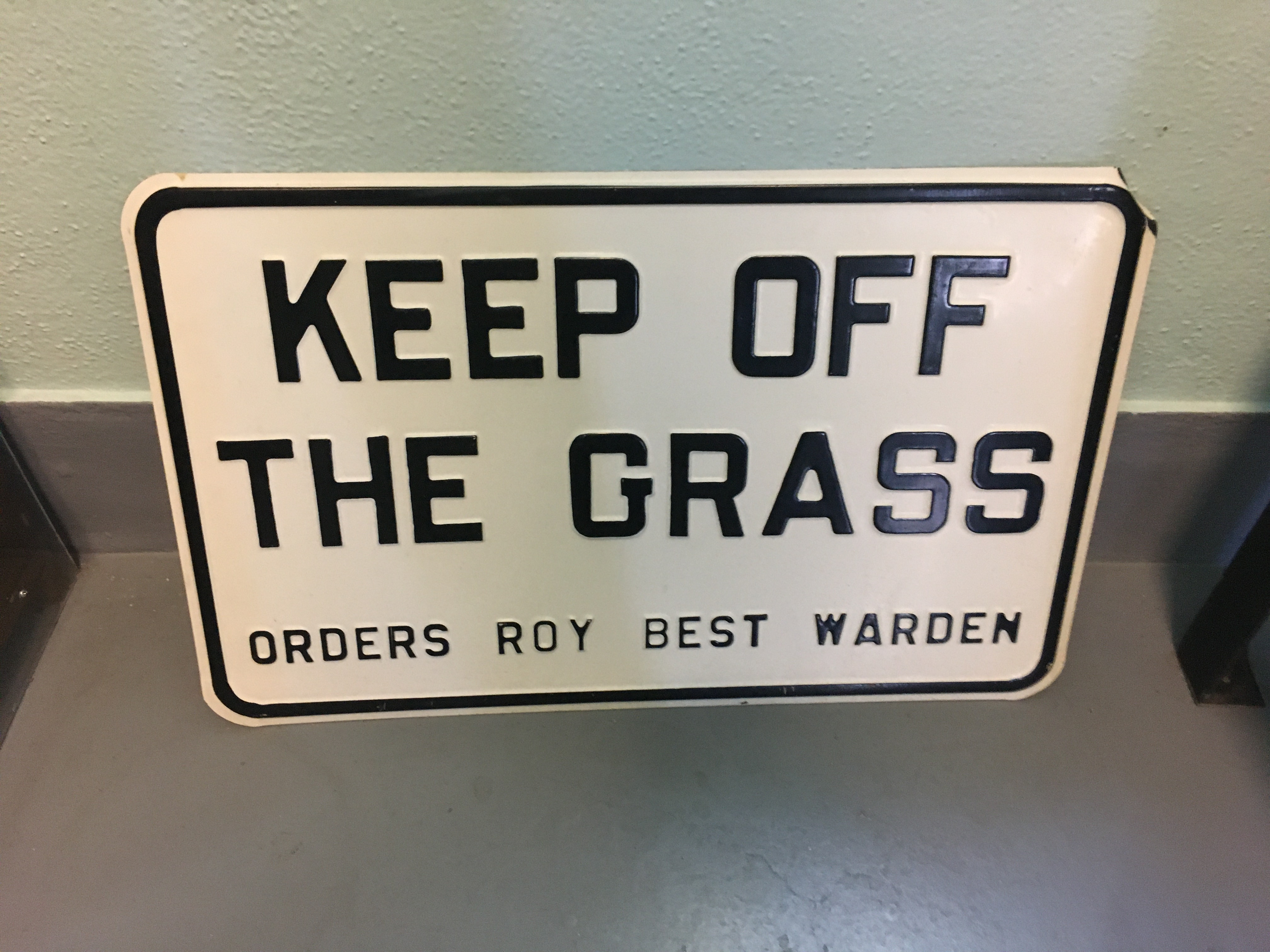
A sign, made in the Colorado Territorial Correctional Facility's sign shop, lists Roy Best as Warden.

Best's legacy remains controversial. Supporters remembered him as a "kindly man" who "took charge of the penitentiary when it was in a state of chaos." "When prisoners were whipped," they wrote, "he did not ask someone else to do it. He did the job himself."

Others criticize his brutal floggings of prisoners, humiliation of gay prisoners, financial misdeeds, and relentless self-promotion.

Despite controversy, Best's influences remain in the culture of prisons and jails in the United States. Gardens and employment training, for example, remain in place in many places of detention.

== Notes ==
Party political offices
| Preceded by Homer Bedford | Democratic nominee for Governor of Colorado; 1944 | Succeeded by William Lee Knous |
