= 1946 Colorado gubernatorial election =

- November 5, 1946
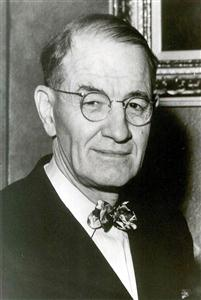

Nominee	William Lee Knous	Leon Lavington
Party	Democratic	Republican
Popular vote	174,604	160,483
Percentage	52.11%	47.89%
- County results Knous: 50–60% 60–70% Lavington: 50–60% 60–70% 70–80%
Governor before election
John Charles Vivian
Republican
Elected Governor
William Lee Knous
Democratic

The 1946 Colorado gubernatorial election was held on November 5, 1946. Democratic nominee William Lee Knous defeated Republican nominee Leon Lavington with 52.11% of the vote, becoming the first Democrat to win the governorship since 1936.

== Primary elections ==
Primary elections were held on September 10, 1946.

=== Democratic primary ===
==== Candidates ====
- William Lee Knous, Chief Justice of the Colorado Supreme Court

==== Results ====
Democratic primary results
Party	Candidate	Votes	%
Democratic	William Lee Knous	45,104	100.00

=== Republican primary ===
==== Candidates ====
- Leon Lavington, Auditor of Colorado

==== Results ====
Republican primary results
Party	Candidate	Votes	%
Republican	Leon Lavington	39,646	100.00

== General election ==
=== Candidates ===
- William Lee Knous, Democratic
- Leon Lavington, Republican

=== Results ===
1946 Colorado gubernatorial election
Party	Candidate	Votes	%	±%
Democratic	William Lee Knous	174,604	52.11%	+4.51%
Republican	Leon Lavington	160,483	47.89%	−4.51%
Majority		14,121	4.22%	
Turnout		335,087		
Democratic gain from Republican		Swing		
