= Lewis Babcock =

American judge (born 1943)

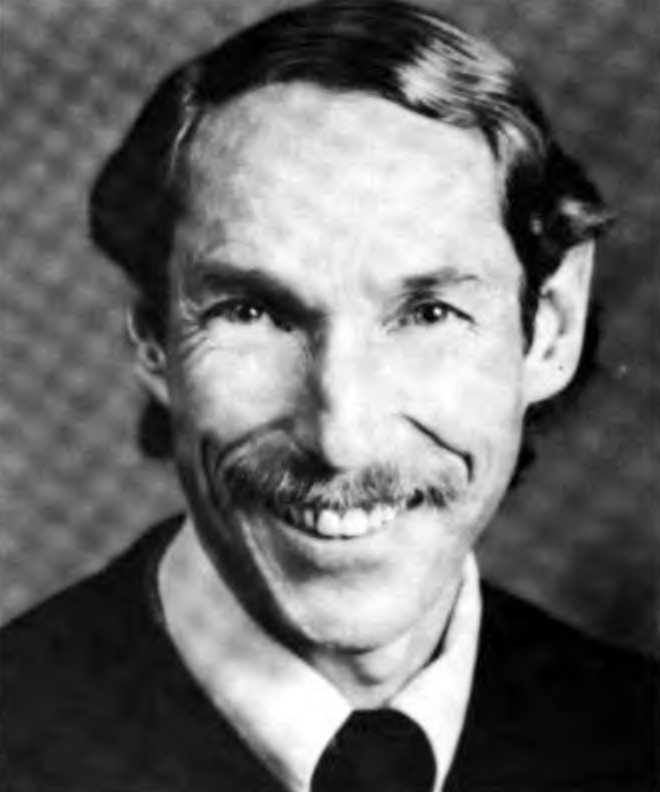

Senior Judge of the United States District Court for the District of Colorado
- Incumbent
- Assumed office April 4, 2008

Chief Judge of the United States District Court for the District of Colorado
- In office 2000–2007
- Preceded by: Richard Paul Matsch
- Succeeded by: Edward Nottingham

Judge of the United States District Court for the District of Colorado
- In office October 17, 1988 – April 4, 2008
- Appointed by: Ronald Reagan
- Preceded by: John L. Kane Jr.
- Succeeded by: Philip A. Brimmer

Personal details
- Born: Lewis Thornton Babcock; April 4, 1943 (age 83) Rocky Ford, Colorado, U.S.
- Education: University of Denver (BA, JD)

Lewis Thornton Babcock (born April 4, 1943) is a senior United States district judge of the United States District Court for the District of Colorado and former judge of the Colorado Court of Appeals.

== Education and career ==
Born in Rocky Ford, Colorado, Babcock received a Bachelor of Arts degree from the University of Denver in 1965 and a Juris Doctor from University of Denver Law School in 1968, and was in private practice in Rocky Ford from then until 1976. While in private practice, he was city attorney for Las Animas, Colorado from 1969 to 1974 and Rocky Ford from 1970 to 1976; he was also an assistant district attorney in La Junta, Colorado. In 1976, he became a district judge in Colorado's 16th Judicial District in La Junta, and chief judge of the district in 1978. He became a judge in the Colorado Court of Appeals in 1983. He received a Master of Laws from the University of Virginia School of Law in 1988.

=== Federal judicial service ===
Babcock was nominated by President Ronald Reagan on June 23, 1988, to a seat on the United States District Court for the District of Colorado vacated by Judge John L. Kane Jr. He was confirmed by the United States Senate on October 14, 1988, and received his commission on October 17, 1988. He served as Chief Judge from 2000 to 2007. He assumed senior status on his 65th birthday on April 4, 2008.

=== Notable cases ===
Among Babcock's notable cases were civil lawsuits over the Columbine High School massacre, including those against Jefferson County Sheriff Office and Sheriff John Stone. and Lane v. Owens, a 2003 decision to enjoin enforcement of a Colorado law requiring students and teachers to recite the Pledge of Allegiance. Judge Babcock also upheld the constitutionality of Colorado's ban on smoking in bars and restaurants.

Other cases include Golan v. Gonzales, in which he held that the copyright provisions of the Uruguay Round Agreements Act did not violate the United States Constitution.

== Sources ==
- Hon. Lewis T. Babcock District of Colorado

Legal offices
Preceded by John L. Kane Jr.	Judge of the United States District Court for the District of Colorado; 1988–2008	Succeeded by Philip A. Brimmer
Preceded by Richard Paul Matsch	Chief Judge of the United States District Court for the District of Colorado; 2000–2007	Succeeded by Edward Nottingham
