= Olin Hatfield Chilson =

American judge (1903–1991)

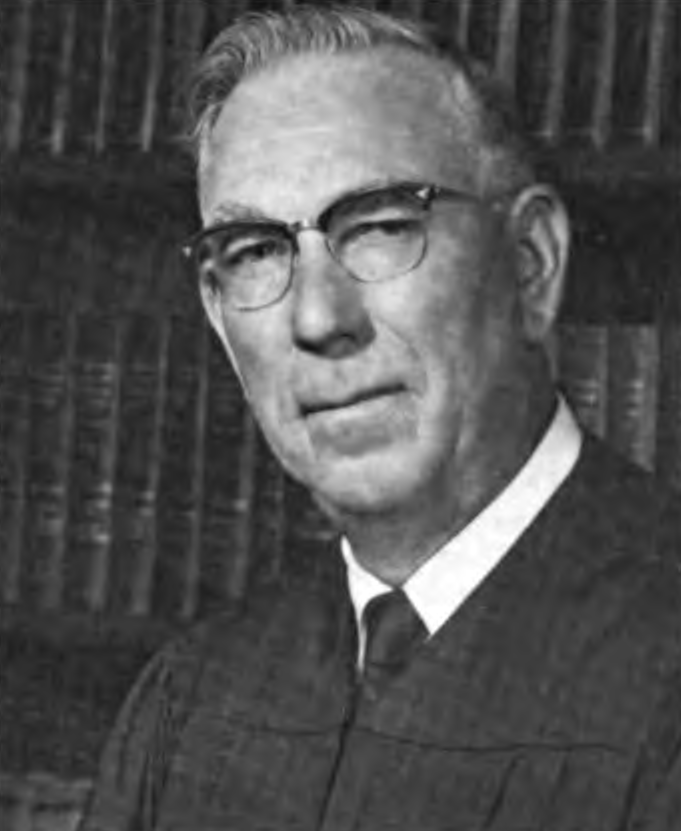

Senior Judge of the United States District Court for the District of Colorado
- In office December 31, 1973 – September 28, 1991

Judge of the United States District Court for the District of Colorado
- In office March 5, 1960 – December 31, 1973
- Appointed by: Dwight D. Eisenhower
- Preceded by: William Lee Knous
- Succeeded by: Richard Paul Matsch

Personal details
- Born: Olin Hatfield Chilson; November 22, 1903 Pueblo, Colorado, U.S.
- Died: September 28, 1991 (aged 87)
- Education: University of Colorado Law School (LL.B.)

Olin Hatfield "Chilly" Chilson (November 22, 1903 – September 28, 1991) was a United States district judge of the United States District Court for the District of Colorado.

== Education and career ==
Born on November 22, 1903, in Pueblo, Colorado, Chilson received a Bachelor of Laws in 1927 from the University of Colorado Law School. At Colorado, he played college football as a quarterback and was captain of the 1925 Colorado Silver and Gold football team. He was also captain of the basketball and baseball teams at Colorado.

Chilson entered private practice in La Jara, Colorado in 1927, practicing in Greeley, from 1927 to 1928, and in Loveland, from 1928 to 1954. He was a district attorney for the Eighth Judicial District of Colorado from 1940 to 1948. He was an Assistant Secretary of the United States Department of the Interior from 1956 to 1957. He was Undersecretary of the United States Department of the Interior from 1957 to 1958. He returned to private practice in Denver, Colorado from 1958 to 1960.

== Federal judicial service ==
Chilson was nominated by President Dwight D. Eisenhower on February 19, 1960, to a seat on the United States District Court for the District of Colorado vacated by Judge William Lee Knous. He was confirmed by the United States Senate on March 1, 1960, and received his commission on March 5, 1960. He was a member of the Judicial Conference of the United States from 1970 to 1973. He assumed senior status on December 31, 1973. His service terminated on September 28, 1991, due to his death.

Legal offices
Preceded by William Lee Knous	Judge of the United States District Court for the District of Colorado; 1960–1973	Succeeded by Richard Paul Matsch
