= Phillip S. Figa =

American judge (1951–2008)

Phillip Figa

Judge of the United States District Court for the District of Colorado
- In office October 6, 2003 – January 5, 2008
- Appointed by: George W. Bush
- Preceded by: Richard Paul Matsch
- Succeeded by: R. Brooke Jackson

Personal details
- Born: Phillip Sam Figa; July 27, 1951 Chicago, Illinois, U.S.
- Died: January 5, 2008 (aged 56) Greenwood Village, Colorado, U.S.
- Education: Northwestern University (BA); Cornell University (JD)

Phillip Sam Figa (July 27, 1951 – January 5, 2008) was an American attorney and jurist who served as a United States district judge of the United States District Court for the District of Colorado.

== Early life and education ==
Born in Chicago, Illinois to Polish Jewish immigrants, Figa attended Northwestern University "through a scholarship caddie program at a nearby country club". He received a Bachelor of Arts degree in economics from Northwestern in 1973, and a Juris Doctor from Cornell Law School in 1976.

== Career ==
Figa was in private practice in Denver, Colorado, from 1976 to 2003.

Figa was one of five people recommended by Senators Ben Nighthorse Campbell and Wayne Allard for a seat on the United States District Court for the District of Colorado after Richard Paul Matsch entered senior status. On June 9, 2003, he was nominated by President George W. Bush for the role. Figa was confirmed by the United States Senate on October 2, 2003, and received his judicial commission on October 6, 2003.

== Illness and death ==
In March 2007, Figa was diagnosed with an aggressive brain tumor. He continued to serve until his death. He died on January 5, 2008, in his home in Greenwood Village, Colorado.

Legal offices
Preceded by Richard Paul Matsch	Judge of the United States District Court for the District of Colorado; 2003–2008	Succeeded by R. Brooke Jackson
