= Leon Lavington =

American politician

Leon Edward Lavington, Sr.

Auditor of Colorado
- In office January 9, 1945 – January 14, 1947
- Governor: John Charles Vivian
- Preceded by: James L. Bradley
- Succeeded by: Homer Bedford

35th Treasurer of Colorado
- In office January 12, 1943 – January 9, 1945
- Governor: John Charles Vivian
- Preceded by: Homer Bedford
- Succeeded by: Homer Bedford

Personal details
- Born: October 8, 1889; Flagler, Colorado
- Died: December 13, 1961 (aged 72); Denver, Colorado
- Political party: Republican

Leon Edward Lavington, Sr. (October 8, 1889 – December 13, 1961) was an American politician who served as the Treasurer of Colorado from 1943 to 1945, as the Auditor of Colorado from 1945 to 1947, and was the Republican candidate in the 1946 United States gubernatorial elections.

== Early life ==
Hon. Leon Edward Lavington, Sr. was the first child born to the pioneering homesteaders of Flagler, Colorado. His parents were William Henry “W.H.” and Louella Isabel “Ella” (Van Heusen) Lavington.

W.H. came to Kit Carson County, Colorado in 1888 by Chicago, Rock Island and Pacific Railroad and developed Flagler along with his partner and brother-in-law, W.L. Price. Prior to the settlement of the town, the location had been named Bowser in memory of the W.H.'s favorite dog who had died. Notable projects include the first general store and combined post office, Flagler State Bank, and the Hotel Flagler built in 1909. The hotel has been placed on the National Register of Historic Places by the United States Department of the Interior; it later became the Flagler Hospital, under by W.L. McBride, and now serves as the Town Hall and library.

W.H. was President of the Flagler State Bank, held the office of County Commissioner for Kit Carson County from 1893 to 1895, and served as Postmaster of Flagler from 1889 to 1894. Ella worked alongside W.H. and served on the School Board of Education for Flagler County Public Schools.

Leon, Sr. graduated from the University of Colorado in 1915 before entering the United States WWI Draft Registration of 1917.

== Marriage ==
His wife, Marjorie (Dixon) Lavington, graduated from the University of Colorado at Boulder, class 1914 and Pi Beta Phi member. She also served as a Former Chairman of the American Red Cross Gray Ladies of Denver.

== Political career ==
When the town of Flagler was incorporated, Leon, Sr. was the first Mayor of Flagler, and served as President of the First National Bank of Flagler, previously the Flagler State Bank.

Initially appointed by Governor Ralph Lawrence Carr to a civil service commission, State Purchasing Agent, Leon, Sr. was elected Auditor of State and Colorado State Treasurer before running for Governor (R 1946). The third largest blizzard in recorded state history preceded the gubernatorial election, shutting down street cars, which resulted in a less than 30 percent voter turn-out (Historical Blizzard, November 2–4, 1946, 30.4 inches). The election was lost by a small margin having won nearly 48 percent of the vote.

== Death and legacy ==
Leon, Sr. died on December 13, 1961, in Denver, Colorado at age 72. He and his wife are buried in the Fairmount Cemetery (Denver, Colorado). Lavington Park is named in his honor.

== Family ==
His son, Leon Edward Lavington, Jr., was a former City Councilman and Mayor of Flagler. Leon Jr. was a track star and lettered in football at Denver's East High School. Later, he lettered in football at the University of Colorado at Boulder in 1935, 1936, and 1937 (#17, Defensive End). He played in the university's first “bowl” game appearance, during the 1938 Cotton Bowl Classic against Rice University.

In 1938, Leon Jr. and teammates, United States Supreme Court Justice “Whizzer” Byron White (succeeded by Ruth Bader Ginsburg), and Gene Moore, were drafted by the National Football League (NFL). They were the first players in the history of the University of Colorado to have been drafted. Leon Jr. was the first End position selected from CU Boulder; he was chosen by the Chicago Cardinals (Draft: Round 8, #65 Overall, End Position).

Leon Jr. worked alongside his friend, Joe "Awful" Coffee, Colorado Sports Hall of Fame inductee Joseph Rutkofsky Coffee, before his death in 1959 at the age of 42. He is buried alongside his wife, Louise (Brourink) Lavington, at the Olinger Crown Hill Cemetery in Wheat Ridge, Colorado. Their son, Leon Lavington III, graduate CU Boulder in 1974.

The Lavington family continue the multi-generational tradition as CU Boulder alumni, and engage in public service throughout Colorado, including the Colorado Department of Education and civil servant positions within Colorado's 4th congressional district.

Party political offices
Preceded by John Charles Vivian	Republican nominee for Governor of Colorado; 1946	Succeeded by David A. Hamil
