= Robert Perske =

American author and disability rights activist

Robert Perske (1927 – August 14, 2016) was an American author, theologian, and disability rights activist.

He advocated in particular for intellectually disabled people wrongly convicted for crimes they did not commit. He formulated the dignity of risk concept. As an ordained Methodist minister some of his writing was influential in changing the way people with intellectual disabilities are treated in religious communities. His most widely known work, Deadly Innocence?, follows the story of Joe Arridy, known as the Happiest Man on Death Row.
