= William Eugene Higby =

American politician

William Eugene Higby (January 26, 1884, in Garden Grove – 1967, in Monument) was the 29th Lieutenant Governor of Colorado, serving from 1943 to 1947 under John Charles Vivian.

Higby strongly opposed the proposed creation of a Missouri Valley Authority.

Political offices
| Preceded by John C. Vivian | Lieutenant Governor of Colorado; 1943–1947 | Succeeded by Homer Pearson |
