= Ben Bezoff =

American politician

Member of the Colorado Senate from the 1st district
- In office January 10, 1951 – January 12, 1955
- Preceded by: Multi-member district
- Succeeded by: Multi-member district

Speaker of the Colorado House of Representatives
- In office August 21, 1950 – January 10, 1951
- Preceded by: Patrick Magill Jr.
- Succeeded by: David A. Hamil

Member of the Colorado House of Representatives from the Denver district
- In office January 8, 1947 – January 10, 1951
- Preceded by: Multi-member district
- Succeeded by: Multi-member district

Personal details
- Born: April 18, 1914 Denver, Colorado, U.S.
- Died: December 30, 1979 (aged 65) Denver, Colorado, U.S.
- Party: Democratic

Ben Bezoff (April 18, 1914 – December 30, 1979) was an American politician who served in the Colorado House of Representatives from the Denver district from 1947 to 1951 and in the Colorado Senate from the 1st district from 1951 to 1955. He served as Speaker of the Colorado House of Representatives from 1950 to 1951.

He died of pancreatic cancer on December 30, 1979, in Denver, Colorado at age 65.
