= Richard Paul Matsch =

American judge (1930–2019)

Senior Judge of the United States District Court for the District of Colorado
- In office July 1, 2003 – May 26, 2019

Chief Judge of the United States District Court for the District of Colorado
- In office 1994–2000
- Preceded by: Sherman Glenn Finesilver
- Succeeded by: Lewis Babcock

Judge of the United States District Court for the District of Colorado
- In office March 8, 1974 – July 1, 2003
- Appointed by: Richard Nixon
- Preceded by: Olin Hatfield Chilson
- Succeeded by: Phillip S. Figa

Personal details
- Born: June 8, 1930 Burlington, Iowa, U.S.
- Died: May 26, 2019 (aged 88) Louisville, Colorado, U.S.
- Spouse: Elizabeth Murdock (m. 1958; died 2017)
- Children: 5
- Education: University of Michigan (A.B.); University of Michigan Law School (J.D.)

Military service
- Branch/service: United States Army
- Years of service: 1953–1955
- Rank: Private first class

Richard Paul Matsch (/meɪʃ/; June 8, 1930 – May 26, 2019) was an American judge who served as United States district judge of the United States District Court for the District of Colorado. Confirmed to the bench in 1974, and serving as chief judge from 1994 to 2000 before taking senior status in 2003, he was best known for presiding over the trials of Timothy McVeigh and Terry Nichols, who perpetrated the Oklahoma City bombing.

== Background ==
Matsch was born in Burlington, Iowa, on June 8, 1930. He graduated from Burlington High School. He earned his Artium Baccalaureus degree from the University of Michigan in 1951, and his Juris Doctor from the University of Michigan Law School in 1953. He was admitted to the Iowa bar in July 1953.

He served in the United States Army from 1953 to 1955, where he performed counterintelligence duties in Korea after hostilities ended. In June 1955, he was a private first class.

== Career ==
He was an attorney in private practice in Denver, Colorado from 1956 to 1959. He was an Assistant United States Attorney of the District of Colorado from 1959 to 1961. He was a deputy city attorney of City and County of Denver, Colorado from 1961 to 1963. He was in private practice in Denver from 1963 to 1965. He was a Referee in Bankruptcy for the District of Colorado from 1965 to 1973, and thereafter served as a United States Bankruptcy Judge for the District of Colorado from 1973 to 1974.

=== Federal judicial service ===
Matsch was nominated by President Richard Nixon on January 31, 1974, to a seat on the United States District Court for the District of Colorado vacated by Judge Olin Hatfield Chilson. He was confirmed by the United States Senate on March 1, 1974, and received his commission on March 8, 1974. He served as Chief Judge from 1994 to 2000. He assumed senior status on July 1, 2003.

==== Notable cases ====
In 1987, Matsch presided over the trials of two members of The Order, neo-Nazi terrorists who assassinated radio host Alan Berg in 1984. He handed down 150-year sentences to both defendants.

Matsch presided over the trials of Oklahoma City bombing defendants Timothy McVeigh and Terry Nichols. The case was moved to Colorado from Oklahoma after a change of venue.

Matsch was also the judge in a lawsuit (Phillips et al. vs. Lucky Gunner) in Denver where Sandy and Lonnie Phillips, whose daughter, Jessica Ghawi, was one of 12 people killed in the 2012 Aurora, Colorado, shooting. Matsch dismissed the case and ordered that Sandy and Lonnie Phillips pay $220,000 in legal costs.

Matsch also presided over the Cook v. Rockwell International Corp., the long-running federal class-action litigation arising from contamination at the Rocky Flats Plant. The lawsuit, filed by thousands of nearby property owners, alleged that plutonium and other hazardous substances released during weapons production had contaminated surrounding properties. Following a lengthy trial, a jury returned a verdict in favor of the plaintiffs, making the case one of the most significant environmental contamination lawsuits associated with Rocky Flats.

In 1996, Matsch declined a petition by members of the Rocky Flats special grand jury seeking release from their secrecy obligations so they could publicly discuss the investigation.

== Personal life ==
In 1958, Matsch married Elizabeth Murdock (1930–2017), an educator; the couple had four daughters and a son. In 1992, one of their daughters died after falling into a fumarole at Hawaiʻi Volcanoes National Park.

In 1989, Matsch and his wife moved from the Denver area to a ranch in Boulder County, Colorado. He was known for wearing cowboy boots with his robes.

Richard Matsch died in Louisville, Colorado, on May 26, 2019, at the age of 88.

== See also ==
- List of United States federal judges by longevity of service

== Sources ==
- Honorable Richard P. Matsch District of Colorado
- Romano, Lois (May 12, 1997). "Richard Matsch Has a Firm Grip on His Gavel in the Oklahoma City Bombing Trial". National Special Report: Oklahoma Bombing Trial. Washington Post.
- "Program Celebrating the Life and Career of US District Judge Richard P. Matsch (1930-2019)"

Legal offices
Preceded by Olin Hatfield Chilson	Judge of the United States District Court for the District of Colorado; 1974–2003	Succeeded by Phillip S. Figa
Preceded by Sherman Glenn Finesilver	Chief Judge of the United States District Court for the District of Colorado; 1994–2000	Succeeded by Lewis Babcock
