= 1948 Colorado gubernatorial election =

- November 2, 1948
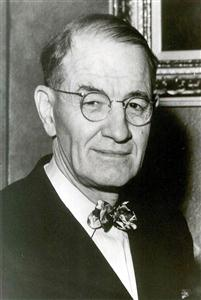

Nominee	William Lee Knous	David A. Hamil
Party	Democratic	Republican
Popular vote	332,752	168,928
Percentage	66.33%	33.67%
- County results Knous: 50–60% 60–70% 70–80% Hamil: 50–60%
Governor before election
William Lee Knous
Democratic
Elected Governor
William Lee Knous
Democratic

The 1948 Colorado gubernatorial election was held on November 2, 1948. Incumbent Democrat William Lee Knous defeated Republican nominee David A. Hamil with 66.33% of the vote.

== Primary elections ==
Primary elections were held on September 14, 1948.

=== Democratic primary ===
==== Candidates ====
- William Lee Knous, incumbent Governor

==== Results ====
Democratic primary results
Party	Candidate	Votes	%
Democratic	William Lee Knous (incumbent)	106,156	100.00

=== Republican primary ===
==== Candidates ====
- David A. Hamil, State Representative

==== Results ====
Republican primary results
Party	Candidate	Votes	%
Republican	David A. Hamil	81,267	100.00

== General election ==
=== Candidates ===
- William Lee Knous, Democratic
- David A. Hamil, Republican

=== Results ===
1948 Colorado gubernatorial election
Party	Candidate	Votes	%	±%
Democratic	William Lee Knous (incumbent)	332,752	66.33%	+14.22%
Republican	David A. Hamil	168,928	33.67%	−14.22%
Majority		163,824	32.66%	+28.44%
Turnout		501,680		
Democratic hold		Swing		
