= 1950 Colorado gubernatorial election =

- November 7, 1950
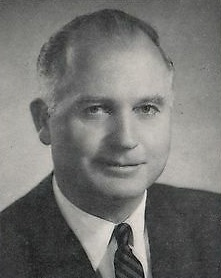

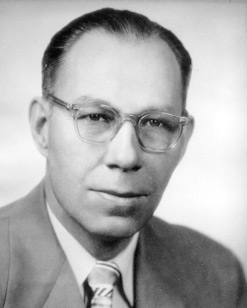
Nominee	Daniel I. J. Thornton	Walter Walford Johnson
Party	Republican	Democratic
Popular vote	236,472	212,976
Percentage	52.43%	47.22%
- County results Thornton: 50–60% 60–70% Johnson: 50–60% 60–70%
Governor before election
Walter Walford Johnson
Democratic
Elected Governor
Daniel I. J. Thornton
Republican

The 1950 Colorado gubernatorial election was held on November 7, 1950. Republican nominee Daniel I. J. Thornton defeated Democratic incumbent Walter Walford Johnson with 52.43% of the vote.

== Primary elections ==
Primary elections were held on September 12, 1950.

=== Democratic primary ===
==== Candidates ====
- Walter Walford Johnson, incumbent Governor

==== Results ====
Democratic primary results
Party	Candidate	Votes	%
Democratic	Walter Walford Johnson (incumbent)	66,685	100.00

=== Republican primary ===
==== Candidates ====
- Daniel I. J. Thornton
- Ray H. Brannaman

==== Results ====
Republican primary results
Party	Candidate	Votes	%
Republican	Daniel I. J. Thornton	54,643	68.2%
Republican	Ray H. Brannaman	25,522	31.8%
Total votes		80,165	100.00%

== General election ==
=== Candidates ===
Major party candidates

- Daniel I. J. Thornton, Republican
- Walter Walford Johnson, Democratic

Other candidates

- Louis K. Stephens, Socialist Labor

=== Results ===
1950 Colorado gubernatorial election
Party	Candidate	Votes	%	±%
Republican	Daniel I. J. Thornton	236,472	52.43%	+18.76%
Democratic	Walter Walford Johnson (incumbent)	212,976	47.22%	−19.11%
Socialist Labor	Louis K. Stephens	1,546	0.34%	
Majority		23,496	5.21%	
Turnout		450,994		
Republican gain from Democratic		Swing		
