= Dignity of risk =

Sociological concept

Dignity of risk is the idea that self-determination and the right to take reasonable risks are essential for dignity and self esteem and so should not be impeded by excessively-cautious caregivers, concerned about their duty of care.

The concept is applicable to adults who are under care such as elderly people, people living with disability, and people with mental health problems. It has also been applied to children, including those living with disabilities.

== History ==
Ideas that would later develop into the concept of dignity of risk arose during the late 1960s in Sweden. Dr. Bengt Nirje formed a group for people both with and without intellectual disabilities. The group would meet to plan an outing, go on the outing, and meet afterwards to discuss how the meeting went. This allowed people with intellectual disabilities to have some 'normal experiences' in the community, and members without intellectual disabilities were told that the participants with disabilities should make their own decisions without interference, even if mistakes were made. Nirje once said, "to be allowed to be human means to be allowed to fail." This group would go on to inspire self advocacy groups around the world.

The concept was first articulated in a 1972 article The dignity of risk and the mentally retarded by Robert Perske:

Overprotection may appear on the surface to be kind, but it can be really evil. An oversupply can smother people emotionally, squeeze the life out of their hopes and expectations, and strip them of their dignity. Overprotection can keep people from becoming all they could become. Many of our best achievements came the hard way: We took risks, fell flat, suffered, picked ourselves up, and tried again. Sometimes we made it and sometimes we did not. Even so, we were given the chance to try. Persons with special needs need these chances, too. Of course, we are talking about prudent risks. People should not be expected to blindly face challenges that, without a doubt, will explode in their faces. Knowing which chances are prudent and which are not – this is a new skill that needs to be acquired. On the other hand, a risk is really only when it is not known beforehand whether a person can succeed. The real world is not always safe, secure, and predictable, it does not always say "please," "excuse me", or "I'm sorry". Every day we face the possibility of being thrown into situations where we will have to risk everything ... In the past, we found clever ways to build avoidance of risk into the lives of persons living with disabilities. Now we must work equally hard to help find the proper amount of risk these people have the right to take. We have learned that there can be healthy development in risk taking and there can be crippling indignity in safety!

In 1980, the concept was relied upon by Julian Wolpert, Professor of Geography, Public Affairs, and Urban Planning at Princeton University, to support his argument in a paper, "The Dignity of Risk", which has since been described as "seminal". Wolpert's argument was that a paternalistic approach to people living with disability, prioritizing safeguarding over the rights of individuals to independent decision-making, is a limitation on personal freedom.

== Conflict with duty of care ==
Allowing people under care to take risks is often perceived to be in conflict with the caregivers' duty of care. Finding a balance between these competing considerations can be difficult when formulating policies and guidelines for caregiving. The concept of the Least Restrictive Alternative emphasizes minimizing intrusion into the lives of those we support. In this framework, autonomy and independence are upheld, and information is offered to facilitate informed decision-making as much as possible.

== Problems of overprotection ==
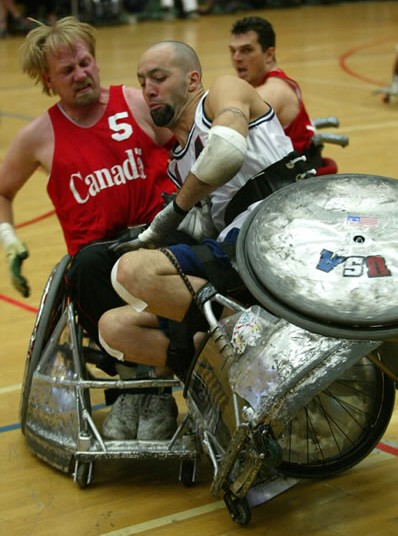
Wheelchair rugby is a full-contact sport played by wheelchair users. In spite of the protective features of the wheelchairs, the risk of injury is significant.

Protection is often used to justify violating the rights of people with disabilities. To deny someone the opportunity to make mistakes is to violate the right to make decisions about their own lives. Many self-advocates see the dignity of risk as a human right. Max Barrows, a self-advocate from Vermont, says "Life is about learning from the mistakes that you make. I appreciate and we appreciate protection from people, but please don't protect us too much or at all from living our lives." Protection has been used to justify institutionalization, sheltered workshops and other segregated settings. Many institutions were and are sites of abuse, neglect and sexual assault. Many people with disabilities are also placed under guardianship, which is when someone else makes decisions about their life, including where they live, how they spend their money, and the health care they receive. This is done to stop people from making "bad choices." Many disability advocates argue for the replacement of guardianship with supported decision making, where people with disabilities make their own decisions with support and accommodations.

Overprotection of people with disabilities causes low self-esteem and underachievement because of lowered expectations that come with overprotection. Internalisation of low expectations causes the person with a disability to believe that they are less capable than others in similar situations.

In elderly people, overprotection can result in learned dependency and a decreased ability for self-care:

"It is possible to deliver physical care that has positive outcomes and returns a person to full function, yet, if during that care they have not been involved, allowed to make choices and respectfully assisted with activities of daily living, it may be possible to cause psychological damage through undermining that person's dignity."

== Disability rights movement ==
The right to fail and the dignity of risk are basic tenets of multiple movements, including the independent living movement and the self advocacy movement.

== Convention on the Rights of Persons with Disabilities ==
The first of eight "guiding principles" of the United Nations' Convention on the Rights of Persons with Disabilities states: "Respect for inherent dignity, individual autonomy including the freedom to make one's own choices, and independence of persons."

Article 12 of the Convention states that states "shall recognize that persons with disabilities enjoy legal capacity on an equal basis with others in all aspects of life" and that "shall take all appropriate and effective measures to ensure the equal right of persons with disabilities to own or inherit property, to control their own financial affairs and to have equal access to bank loans, mortgages and other forms of financial credit, and shall ensure that persons with disabilities are not arbitrarily deprived of their property."

== See also ==
- Agency (sociology)
- Gillick competence
- Infantilization
- Normalization
- Institutional syndrome
- Olmstead v. L.C.
- Ableism
- Benevolent sexism
