= Philip A. Brimmer =

American judge (born 1959)

Philip Brimmer
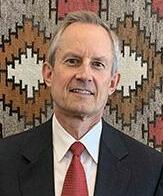

Chief Judge of the United States District Court for the District of Colorado
- In office March 3, 2019 – March 3, 2026
- Preceded by: Marcia S. Krieger
- Succeeded by: Daniel D. Domenico

Judge of the United States District Court for the District of Colorado
- Incumbent
- Assumed office October 14, 2008
- Appointed by: George W. Bush
- Preceded by: Lewis Babcock

Personal details
- Born: Philip Andrew Brimmer; March 15, 1959 (age 67) Rawlins, Wyoming, U.S.
- Party: Republican
- Spouse: Dana Brimmer
- Relatives: Clarence Addison Brimmer Jr. (father)
- Education: Harvard University (BA); Yale University (JD)

Philip Andrew Brimmer (born March 15, 1959) is a United States district judge of the United States District Court for the District of Colorado. He is the son of Clarence Addison Brimmer Jr., a former federal judge in Wyoming.

== Education and career ==
Born in Rawlins, Wyoming, Brimmer received a Bachelor of Arts degree from Harvard College in 1981 and a Juris Doctor from Yale Law School in 1985. He was a law clerk for Judge Zita Leeson Weinshienk of the United States District Court for the District of Colorado from 1985 to 1987. He was in private practice in Colorado from 1987 to 1994, and then served as a deputy district attorney in the Denver District Attorney's Office from 1994 to 2001, briefly serving as its chief deputy district attorney in 2001. He became an Assistant United States Attorney for the District of Colorado in 2001, becoming chief of the major crimes section in 2006, and served as chief of the special prosecutions section from 2006 to 2008. Brimmer is a Republican. He is married to Dana Brimmer.

=== Federal judicial service ===
On July 10, 2008, Brimmer was nominated by President George W. Bush to a seat on the United States District Court for the District of Colorado vacated by Lewis Babcock. Brimmer was confirmed by the United States Senate on September 26, 2008, and received his commission on October 14, 2008. He served as chief judge from March 3, 2019 to March 3, 2026.

Legal offices
Preceded by Lewis Babcock	Judge of the United States District Court for the District of Colorado; 2008–present	Incumbent
Preceded by Marcia S. Krieger	Chief Judge of the United States District Court for the District of Colorado; 2019–2026	Succeeded by Daniel D. Domenico
