= Charlotte Sweeney =

American judge (born 1969)

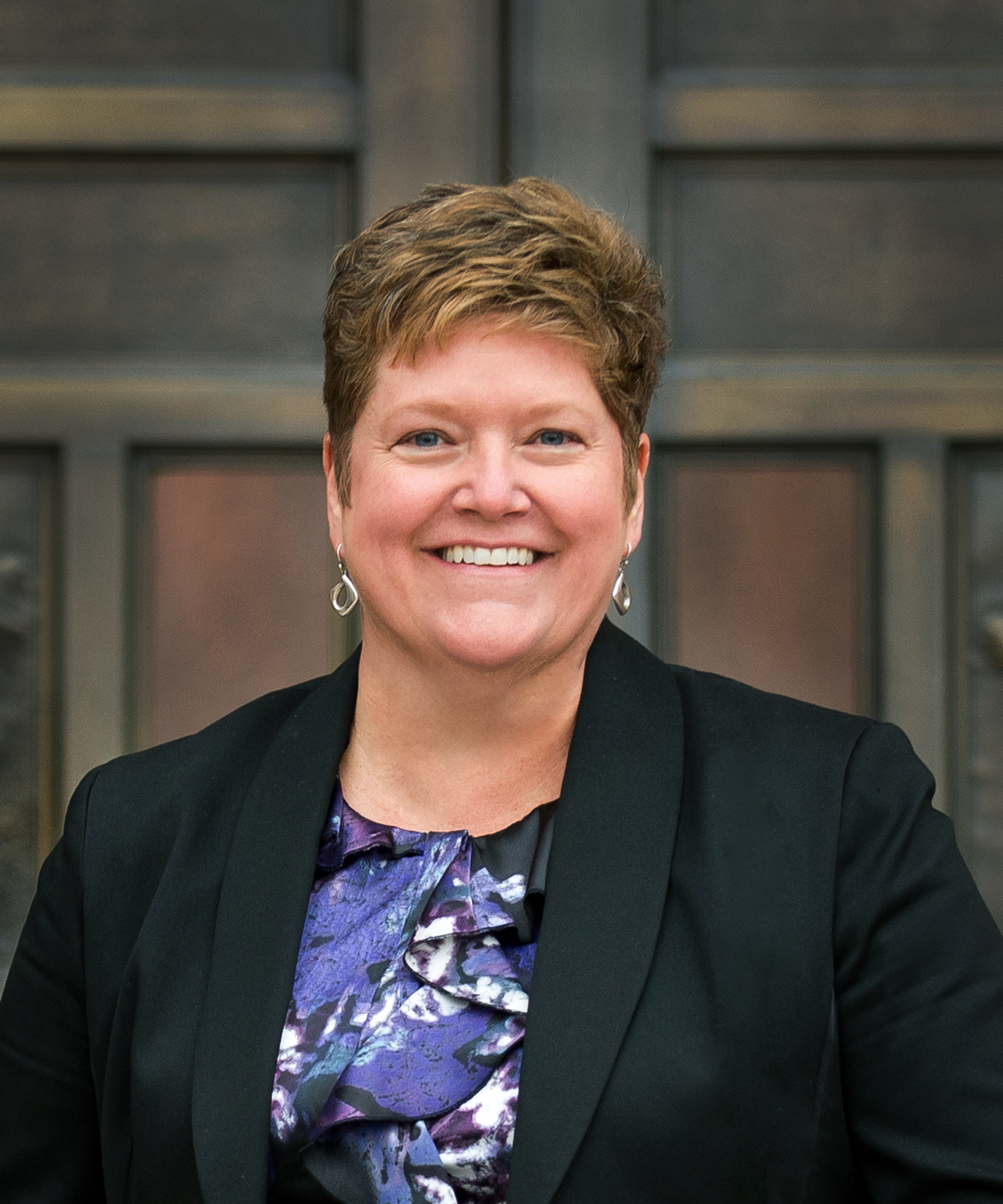

Judge of the United States District Court for the District of Colorado
- Incumbent
- Assumed office July 18, 2022
- Appointed by: Joe Biden
- Preceded by: R. Brooke Jackson

Personal details
- Born: Charlotte Noelle Sweeney; 1969 (age 56–57) Englewood, Colorado, U.S.
- Education: California Lutheran University (BS); University of Denver (JD)

Charlotte Noelle Sweeney (born 1969) is an American lawyer from Colorado who serves as a United States district judge of the United States District Court for the District of Colorado.

== Early life and education ==
Sweeney was born in 1969 in Englewood, Colorado, the youngest daughter of Shepard “Shep” and Gregg Ann Sweeney (née Tucker). She received a Bachelor of Science from California Lutheran University in 1991 and a Juris Doctor from the Sturm College of Law in 1995.

== Career ==
Sweeney began her career as an associate with LaFond & Clausen, LLC in 1995 and was named a partner at the firm in 1998. From 1999 to 2008, she was a partner with LaFond & Sweeney, LLC. From 2008 to 2022, she was a partner at Sweeney & Bechtold, LLC., where she focused on civil rights and employment discrimination law. In 2019, she helped draft the Equal Pay for Equal Work Act in Colorado.

=== Federal judicial service ===
In May 2021, Sweeney was one of three candidates recommended to the White House by Senators John Hickenlooper and Michael Bennet. On August 5, 2021, President Joe Biden nominated Sweeney to serve as a United States district judge of the United States District Court for the District of Colorado. President Biden nominated Sweeney to the seat vacated by Judge R. Brooke Jackson, who would assume senior status on September 30, 2021. On October 20, 2021, a hearing on her nomination was held before the Senate Judiciary Committee. On December 2, 2021, the committee failed to report her nomination by an 11–11 vote. On January 3, 2022, her nomination was returned to the President under Rule XXXI, Paragraph 6 of the United States Senate; she was renominated the same day. On January 20, 2022, the committee again failed to report her nomination by an 11–11 vote. On May 11, 2022, the Senate discharged the committee from further consideration of her nomination by a 51–49 vote. On May 24, 2022, the Senate invoked cloture on her nomination by a 48–42 vote. On May 25, 2022, her nomination was confirmed by a 48–46 vote. She received her judicial commission on July 18, 2022. She is the first openly LGBT federal judge in Colorado and the first openly LGBT woman to serve as a federal district court judge west of the Mississippi.

=== Notable cases ===
In May 2025, Sweeney blocked the Trump administration from using the Alien Enemies Act to deport migrants.

== Associations and memberships ==
Sweeney previously led the labor and employment section of the Colorado Bar Association as well as the Plaintiff Employment Lawyers Association. She is a member of the Colorado LGBT Bar Association. From 2016 to 2022, she served on the board of directors of the Matthew Shepard Foundation, and as interim treasurer from 2021 to 2022.

== See also ==
- List of LGBT jurists in the United States

Legal offices
Preceded by R. Brooke Jackson	Judge of the United States District Court for the District of Colorado; 2022–present	Incumbent
