= Marcia S. Krieger =

American judge (born 1954)

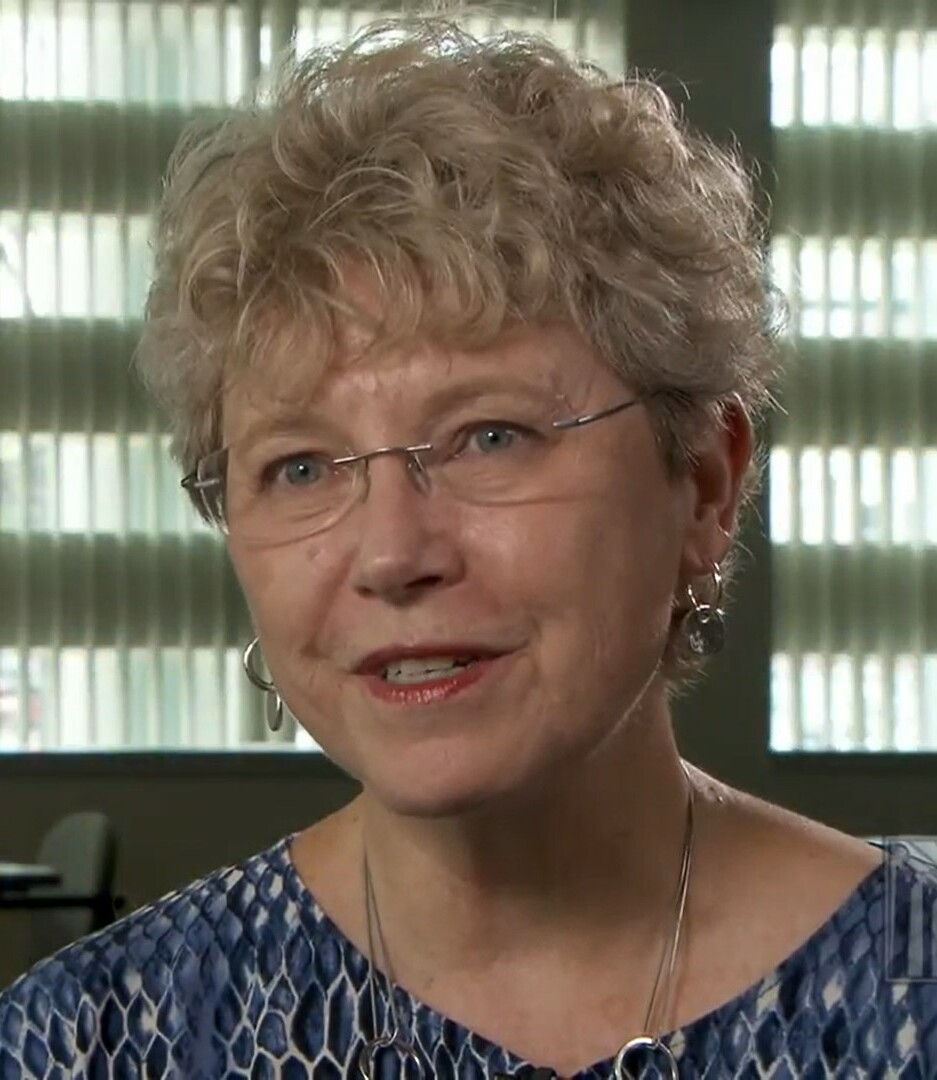
- Krieger in 2017

Senior Judge of the United States District Court for the District of Colorado
- Incumbent
- Assumed office March 3, 2019

Chief Judge of the United States District Court for the District of Colorado
- In office January 1, 2013 – March 3, 2019
- Preceded by: Wiley Young Daniel
- Succeeded by: Philip A. Brimmer

Judge of the United States District Court for the District of Colorado
- In office January 30, 2002 – March 3, 2019
- Appointed by: George W. Bush
- Preceded by: Daniel B. Sparr
- Succeeded by: Regina M. Rodriguez

Personal details
- Born: March 3, 1954 (age 72); Denver, Colorado, U.S
- Education: Lewis and Clark College (BA); University of Colorado Law School (JD)

Marcia Smith Krieger (born March 3, 1954) is a senior United States district judge of the United States District Court for the District of Colorado.

== Early life and education ==
Born in Denver, Colorado, Krieger graduated from Lewis and Clark College with her Bachelor of Arts degree in 1975 and later from University of Colorado Law School with a Juris Doctor in 1979.

== Career ==
Following law school graduation, Krieger worked in private practice in Colorado from 1979 to 1994. In 1994 she became a United States Bankruptcy Judge for the District of Colorado where she worked until her nomination to the federal bench in 2002. Krieger was also an Adjunct lecturer for the University of Colorado at Boulder from 1999 to 2001.

=== Federal judicial career ===
Krieger was nominated to the United States District Court for the District of Colorado by President George W. Bush on September 10, 2001, to a seat vacated by Judge Daniel B. Sparr, who assumed senior status. Krieger was confirmed by the Senate on January 25, 2002, and received her commission on January 30, 2002. She served as the chief judge from January 1, 2013, to March 3, 2019. She assumed senior status on March 3, 2019.

=== Notable cases ===
In 2003, Krieger sentenced Scott Lee Kimball to time served and three years' supervised release for passing bad checks in Alaska, as well as full restitution and a $5,000 fine, per a plea agreement between him and the government that took into account Kimball's service up to that point as an FBI informant. Unbeknownst to her, the FBI or anyone else involved in his case, Kimball had already committed three of the four serial murders he would later plead guilty to; he is currently serving a 70-year sentence. At the sentencing, Krieger expressed some reservations about Kimball's reticence about his own financial situation in the face of his willingness to inform on others, but since she could not find any legal precedent for refusing the downward departure from the Federal Sentencing Guidelines the prosecution asked for in exchange for his demonstrated cooperation, she granted it.

In 2010, Krieger denied a new trial for former Qwest Chief Executive Officer Joseph Nacchio's 2007 conviction of insider trading charges. Nacchio's legal team claimed that testimony former Qwest Chief Financial Officer Robin Szeliga gave in a civil lawsuit related to the case differed from testimony given in the criminal trial. Krieger disallowed the request on the basis that the testimony in the civil trial was not substantially different from the criminal trial and that minor differences were unlikely to result in an acquittal.

In 2018, Krieger declined a request to return an imprisoned transgender woman, Lindsay Saunders-Velez, to her cell after her lawyers argued that the "punishment pod" she had been assigned to after a minor infraction housed several male inmates who had tormented her previously. Krieger said that the attorneys had not proved a risk of “imminent and irreparable injury”. Hours after the judge issued her ruling, Saunders-Velez was allegedly raped. She was taken to a hospital with rectal and other injuries. A nurse there noted that the alleged rapist might be HIV positive.

Legal offices
Preceded by Daniel B. Sparr	Judge of the United States District Court for the District of Colorado; 2002–2019	Succeeded by Regina M. Rodriguez
Preceded by Wiley Young Daniel	Chief Judge of the United States District Court for the District of Colorado; 2013–2019	Succeeded by Philip A. Brimmer
