= 1944 Colorado gubernatorial election =

- November 7, 1944
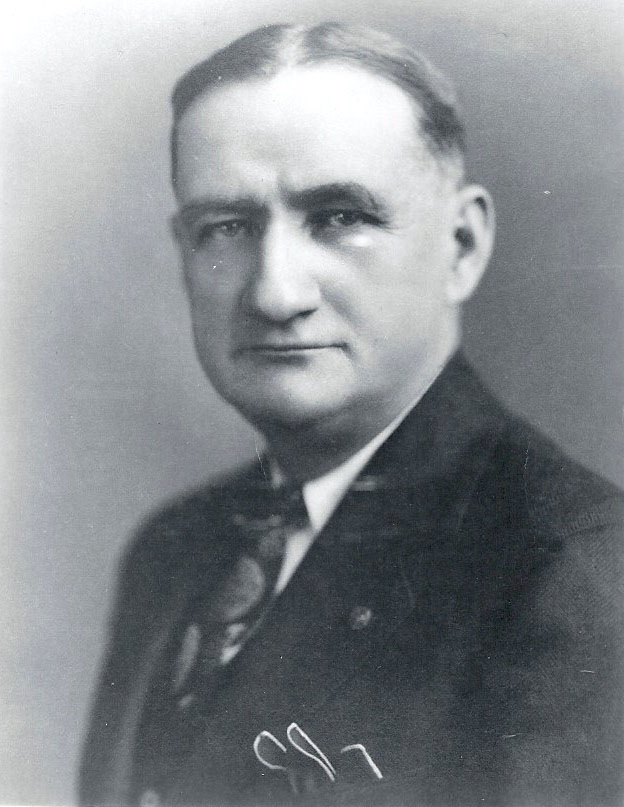

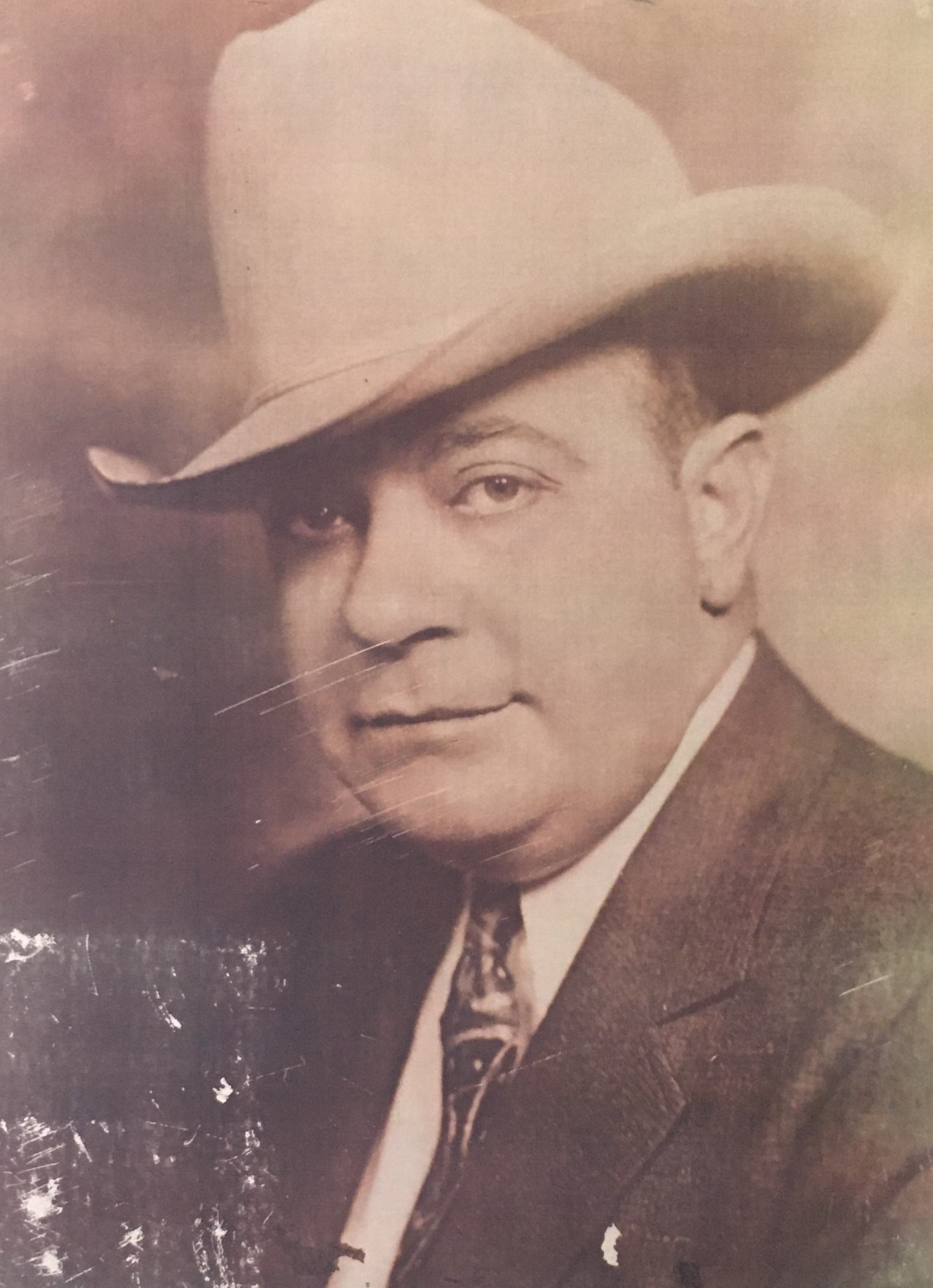
Nominee	John Charles Vivian	Roy Phelix Best
Party	Republican	Democratic
Popular vote	259,862	236,086
Percentage	52.40%	47.60%
- County results Vivian: 50–60% 60–70% Best: 50–60%
Governor before election
John Charles Vivian
Republican
Elected Governor
John Charles Vivian
Republican

The 1944 Colorado gubernatorial election was held on November 7, 1944. Incumbent Republican John Charles Vivian defeated Democratic nominee Roy Phelix Best with 52.40% of the vote.

== Primary elections ==
Primary elections were held on September 12, 1944.

=== Democratic primary ===
==== Candidates ====
- Roy Phelix Best, Colorado State Penitentiary Warden

==== Results ====
Democratic primary results
Party	Candidate	Votes	%
Democratic	Roy Phelix Best	34,081	100.00
Total votes		34,081	100.00

=== Republican primary ===
==== Candidates ====
- John Charles Vivian, incumbent Governor

==== Results ====
Republican primary results
Party	Candidate	Votes	%
Republican	John Charles Vivian (incumbent)	43,227	100.00
Total votes		43,227	100.00

== General election ==
=== Candidates ===
- John Charles Vivian, Republican
- Roy Phelix Best, Democratic

=== Results ===
1944 Colorado gubernatorial election
Party	Candidate	Votes	%	±%
Republican	John Charles Vivian (incumbent)	259,862	52.40%	−3.83%
Democratic	Roy Phelix Best	236,086	47.60%	+4.19%
Majority		23,777	4.80%	−8.02%
Turnout		495,947		
Republican hold		Swing		
