= Homer Pearson =

American politician (1900–1985)

Homer L. Pearson

30th Lieutenant Governor of Colorado
- In office January 14, 1947 – January 11, 1949
- Governor: William Lee Knous
- Preceded by: William Eugene Higby
- Succeeded by: Walter Walford Johnson

Speaker of the Colorado House of Representatives
- In office 1941–1946
- Preceded by: William E. Higby
- Succeeded by: William A. Carlson

Member of the Colorado House of Representatives from the Jefferson County district
- In office 1937–1946

Personal details
- Born: December 31, 1900 Wheat Ridge, Colorado, U.S.
- Died: June 9, 1985 (aged 84) Wheat Ridge, Colorado, U.S.
- Party: Republican
- Education: Colorado State University
- Occupation: Politician; florist

Homer L. Pearson (December 31, 1900 – June 9, 1985) was an American politician who served as the 30th Lieutenant Governor of Colorado from 1947 to 1949 under Governor William Lee Knous. He was speaker of the Colorado House of Representatives from 1941 to 1946.

== Early life ==
Homer L. Pearson was born on December 31, 1900, in Wheat Ridge, Colorado. He graduated from Wheat Ridge High School. He then attended the Colorado State University College of Agricultural Sciences.

== Career ==
Pearson worked as a truck gardener and construction worker. He then worked as a nurseryman at Wilmore Nurseries in 1924. In 1928, he started operating his own greenhouse and specialized in carnations. He was president of the American Carnation Society. He was the first florist from Colorado to become the director of the Society of American Florists. He served as the judge at national flower shows.

Pearson was a Republican. In 1936, he was elected to the Colorado House of Representatives. He served five consecutive terms until 1946. He served as speaker of the House from 1941 to 1946. He was the first legislator to serve three terms as speaker. He sponsored legislation for the first rural fire protection districts, the first planning and zoning act, and the Water and Sanitation Act of 1939.

In 1946, Pearson was elected as Lieutenant Governor of Colorado under Governor William Lee Knous. In June 1949, Governor Knous appointed Pearson as commissioner of the newly formed state department of agriculture. He resigned shortly after on June 18th, following a clash with Fred Ley, the civil service head of the marketing division of the department. He was appointed to the state board of agriculture that governed the Colorado State University on June 9, 1961, and remained with the board until 1969. He served as vice president of the board from 1965 to 1967.

== Personal life ==
Pearson lived on 38th Street in Wheat Ridge. He died on June 9, 1985, in Wheat Ridge.

Political offices
Preceded by William E. Higby	Lieutenant Governor of Colorado; 1947–1949	Succeeded by Walter W. Johnson
