= David A. Hamil =

American politician from Colorado

Speaker of the Colorado House of Representatives
- In office January 3, 1951 – June 1956
- Preceded by: Ben Bezoff
- Succeeded by: Charles Conklin

Member of the Colorado House of Representatives from the Logan district
- In office January 3, 1951 – June 1956
- Preceded by: Harley N. Beery
- Succeeded by: Howard B. Propst
- In office January 4, 1939 – January 5, 1949
- Preceded by: Percy L. Conklin
- Succeeded by: Harley N. Beery

Personal details
- Born: December 3, 1908 Proctor, Colorado, U.S.
- Died: July 27, 2002 (aged 93) Sterling, Colorado, U.S.
- Party: Republican

David A. Hamil (December 3, 1908 – July 27, 2002) was an American politician who served in the Colorado House of Representatives from the Logan district from 1939 to 1949 and from 1951 to 1956. He served as Speaker of the Colorado House of Representatives from 1951 to 1956.

Party political offices
Preceded by Leon Lavington	Republican nominee for Governor of Colorado; 1948	Succeeded by Daniel I. J. Thornton
