= Walter Walford Johnson =

American politician (1904–1987)

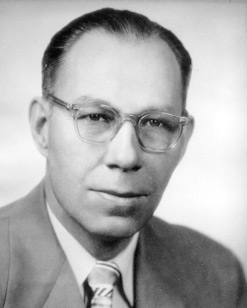

32nd Governor of Colorado
- In office April 15, 1950 – January 9, 1951
- Lieutenant: Charles P. Murphy
- Preceded by: William L. Knous
- Succeeded by: Daniel I. J. Thornton

31st Lieutenant Governor of Colorado
- In office January 11, 1949 – April 15, 1950
- Governor: William L. Knous
- Preceded by: Homer Pearson
- Succeeded by: Charles P. Murphy

Personal details
- Born: April 16, 1904 Pueblo, Colorado, U.S.
- Died: March 23, 1987 (aged 82) Tempe, Arizona, U.S.
- Party: Democratic

Walter Walford Johnson (April 16, 1904 – March 23, 1987) was an American businessman and Democratic politician who served as the 32nd governor of the state of Colorado from 1950 to 1951. He was the first governor of Colorado to have been born in the 20th century.

Walter Walfred Johnson was born in Pueblo, Colorado on April 16, 1904. He married Neva Morrow in 1922. The couple had two children, Winnifred and Walfred. Johnson developed real estate and insurance businesses in Pueblo.

In 1940, Johnson was elected to the Colorado State Senate. In 1948, he was elected Lieutenant Governor of Colorado. In April 1950, Colorado Governor William Lee Knous resigned to become a federal district judge in Denver. Johnson succeeded Knous as governor and completed the remaining nine months of Knous' term. Johnson ran unsuccessfully against Republican Dan Thornton for a full gubernatorial term in 1950.

In 1970, Johnson retired to Tempe, Arizona. He died there after a brief illness on March 23, 1987, 24 days short of his 83rd birthday, and is buried at Pueblo.

== See also ==
- History of Colorado
- Law and government of Colorado
- List of governors of Colorado
- State of Colorado

Party political offices
Preceded by William Lee Knous	Democratic nominee for Governor of Colorado; 1950	Succeeded by John W. Metzger
Political offices
Preceded by Homer Pearson	Lieutenant Governor of Colorado; 1949–1950	Succeeded by Charles P. Murphy
Preceded by William Lee Knous	Governor of Colorado; 1950–1951	Succeeded by Daniel I.J. Thornton
