= R. Brooke Jackson =

American judge (born 1947)

Senior Judge of the United States District Court for the District of Colorado
- Incumbent
- Assumed office September 30, 2021

Judge of the United States District Court for the District of Colorado
- In office September 1, 2011 – September 30, 2021
- Appointed by: Barack Obama
- Preceded by: Phillip S. Figa
- Succeeded by: Charlotte Sweeney

Personal details
- Born: Richard Brooke Jackson; March 5, 1947 (age 79) Bozeman, Montana, U.S.
- Education: Dartmouth College (AB); Harvard University (JD)

Richard Brooke Jackson (born March 5, 1947) is a senior United States district judge serving on the United States District Court for the District of Colorado. Jackson formerly served as a Colorado state judge.

== Early life and education ==
In March 1947, Jackson was born in Bozeman, Montana. In 1969, Jackson earned an Artium Baccalaureus from Dartmouth College. He then earned a Juris Doctor in 1972 from Harvard Law School.

== Career ==
Jackson spent 26 years with the law firm Holland & Hart, including as an associate from 1972 until 1978, and as a partner from 1978 until 1998. Jackson was appointed to the state bench in 1998, and in 2003 was named Chief Judge for Colorado's First Judicial District, which covers Jefferson County, Colorado and Gilpin County, Colorado.

=== Federal judicial service ===
On September 29, 2010, President Barack Obama nominated Jackson to a judicial seat on the United States District Court for the District of Colorado, to fill the vacancy created by the death of Judge Phillip S. Figa. Jackson's nomination lapsed at the end of 2010. President Obama renominated him on January 5, 2011. The United States Senate confirmed him by unanimous consent on August 2, 2011. He received his judicial commission on September 1, 2011. He assumed senior status on September 30, 2021.

=== Notable rulings ===
On June 5, 2020, Jackson issued a temporary restraining order against the City and County of Denver, Colorado, and the Denver Police Department in particular, forbidding assaults against peaceful protesters who participate in demonstrations against George Floyd's murder by the Minneapolis Police Department. The order included other police officers working with the City and County of Denver. Specifically, the order forbid using tear gas, pepper spray, pepper balls and rubber bullets against protesters unless a Captain is on scene, witnesses an act of violence, and gives an order to use them; and forbids the use of projectiles shot at protestors aimed at the head, back or pelvis. The protestors suffered injuries such as broken bones (including facial bones), ruptured scrotums (due to aiming at the groin), and included attacks on medics trying to render aid to injured protestors.

On November 22, 2016, Jackson ruled in favor of Dana Zzyym, a Navy veteran who was born intersex and uses they/them pronouns, after Zzyym sued the U.S. State Department for a passport that would reflect a gender other than “male” or “female.” Zzyym had applied for a U.S. passport to attend the International Intersex Forum in Mexico City but was denied because they did not select “male” or “female” on their application. Jackson ruled that the State Department cannot deny a passport to a person who declines to select either “male” or “female” as their gender in their passport application.

Legal offices
Preceded by Phillip S. Figa	Judge of the United States District Court for the District of Colorado; 2011–2021	Succeeded by Charlotte Sweeney
