= Canon City (film) =

1948 film by Crane Wilbur

- Theatrical release poster
- Directed by: Crane Wilbur
- Written by: Crane Wilbur
- Produced by: Bryan Foy; Robert Kane
- Starring: Scott Brady; Jeff Corey; Whit Bissell; Roy Best
- Narrated by: Reed Hadley
- Cinematography: John Alton
- Edited by: Louis Sackin
- Color process: Black and white
- Production company: Bryan Foy Productions
- Distributed by: Eagle-Lion Films
- Release date: June 30, 1948
- Running time: 82 minutes
- Country: United States
- Language: English
- Budget: $424,000 or $387,000
- Box office: $1.2 million or $2 million

Canon City is a 1948 American film noir crime film written and directed by Crane Wilbur. The drama features Scott Brady, Jeff Corey, and Whit Bissell, along with prison warden Roy Best playing himself. The film takes its name from Canon City, Colorado. (Note: Since 1994, Canon City in Colorado has been officially named Cañon City.)

== Plot ==
This account of a violent prison break is a semi-documentary that opens with a newsreel-type tour of the prison. Led by Carl Schwartzmiller (Jeff Corey), 12 convicts plan their escape but prisoner Jim Sherbondy (Scott Brady) is reluctant to go along with the group.

== Cast ==
- Scott Brady as Sherbondy
- Jeff Corey as Schwartzmiller
- Whit Bissell as Heilman
- Stanley Clements as New
- Charles Russell as Tolley
- DeForest Kelley as Smalley
- Ralph Byrd as Officer Gray
- Mabel Paige as Mrs. Oliver
- Roy Best as himself (as Warden Roy Best)
- Virginia Mullen as Mrs. Smith
- Brick Sullivan as Guard

== Background ==
The film is based on a prison break that occurred at the Colorado Territorial Correctional Facility at Canon City, Colorado, on 30 December 1947. Within a week, all escapees were killed or captured.

== Production ==
The film was shot almost entirely on location at the site of the Canon City state penitentiary in March 1948. It was originally budgeted at $350,000.

== Reception ==
=== Critical response ===
The New York Times film critic Bosley Crowther wrote, "Another convincing demonstration that crime, while it may not 'pay,' can be turned to profitable uses by the makers of action films is given by Canon City, a tough semi-documentary job about a prison break in Colorado ... Crane Wilbur has held to a realistic line for much of the prison action and in some of the outside episodes. His actors—especially Jeff Corey, who plays the leader of the 'break'—are generally tough, convincing fellows with nothing to recommend in charm. And the movement is swift and dynamic, not unlikely in such affairs."

Critic Dennis Schwartz said of the film, "An unspectacular true story (it's dated) about a prison break that is told in a semi-documentary style. Its saving grace is that it is well presented ...This minor work has some resemblance to film noir through the characterization of Sherbondy as someone who is not a hardened criminal, but got into trouble both on the outside and then inside of prison because he made the wrong friends."
