= Necktie social =

Euphemism for execution by hanging

"Necktie social", or "Necktie parties", is a euphemism for execution by hanging commonly used in the American Old West. Additionally, the term is also used literally, for a social event that involved selling donated neckties for charity.

The term "necktie party" was used by one of the justices during oral argument of Hamdan v. Rumsfeld (05-184) in the United States Supreme Court on March 28, 2006.
