= William Lee Knous =

American judge (1889–1959)

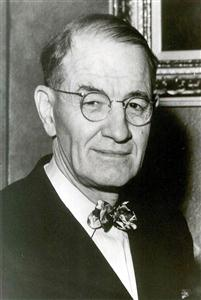

Chief Judge of the United States District Court for the District of Colorado
- In office 1954–1959
- Preceded by: Office established
- Succeeded by: Alfred A. Arraj

Judge of the United States District Court for the District of Colorado
- In office April 7, 1950 – December 12, 1959
- Appointed by: Harry S. Truman
- Preceded by: John Foster Symes
- Succeeded by: Olin Hatfield Chilson

31st Governor of Colorado
- In office January 14, 1947 – April 15, 1950
- Lieutenant: Homer Pearson; Walter Walford Johnson
- Preceded by: John Charles Vivian
- Succeeded by: Walter Walford Johnson

Member of the Colorado House of Representatives
- In office 1928-1930

Member of the Colorado Senate
- In office 1930-1936

Personal details
- Born: William Lee Knous; February 2, 1889 Ouray, Colorado, U.S.
- Died: December 12, 1959 (aged 70) Denver, Colorado, U.S.
- Party: Democratic
- Spouse: Maude Charlotte Kleyn Vivian (m.1925)
- Children: 3
- Education: University of Colorado Law School (LL.B.)

William Lee Knous (February 2, 1889 – December 12, 1959) was an American attorney who served as the chief justice of the Colorado Supreme Court, the 31st governor of Colorado and a United States district judge of the United States District Court for the District of Colorado.

The National Governors Association states that he is the only person "to have occupied the highest seat in the legislative, judicial, and executive branches of government" in Colorado.

== Early life and education ==
Born on February 2, 1889, in Ouray, Colorado, he was the son of John F. Knous of Pennsylvania Dutch descent. His mother, Julia Bain, was of Irish and Scottish ancestry. Both parents descended from men who fought in the Revolutionary War. In the early 1870s, John Knous moved from Iowa to Colorado, where he worked as a wagon boss and freighter that hauled supplies for the mining industry in Leadville. In Ouray, he drove a stagecoach between Ouray and Silverton. He also mined and prospected before becoming the town marshal and undersheriff.

As a boy, William Knous began a lifelong interest in fishing and hunting. He graduated from Ouray High School, where he was the class valedictorian. He began working in the mines because it paid well. He played semi-pro baseball and entered local boxing matches, from which he earned money for college. Knous received a Bachelor of Law degree with honors in 1911 from the University of Colorado Law School. He was admitted to the bar in Colorado in 1911.

== Career ==
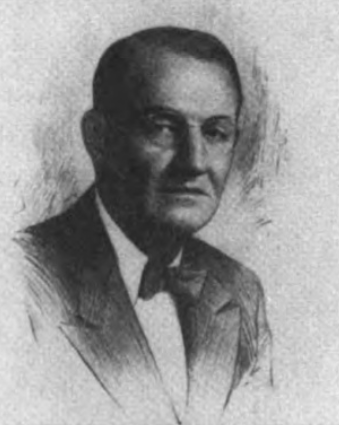
Knous as governor.

Knous entered private practice first in Ouray from 1911 to 1916, when he had fewer clients due to an economic downturn in the mining industry. He was a deputy district attorney for Ouray County, Colorado from 1913 to 1918, except a portion of one year from 1916 to 1917 when he wrote for legal publications in Rochester, New York. Realizing his preference to live in the Rocky Mountains, he returned to Colorado. He then worked with the Moynihan-Hughes-Knous law firm in Montrose, where he became a mining and irrigation legal expert. He was the Mayor of Montrose, Colorado from 1926 to 1930. He was a member of the Colorado House of Representatives from 1928 to 1930. A western conservative, he was interested in issues faced by cattle ranchers and water rights. While in Montrose, he was the Chamber of Commerce president and city attorney.

He was in private practice in Denver, Colorado to 1937. He was a member of the Colorado Senate from 1930 to 1936, serving as president pro Tem from 1935 to 1936. He was a justice of the Colorado Supreme Court from 1937 to 1947, serving as chief justice from 1946 to 1947. He helped solve a major oil workers' strike and other national issues when he served on the national War Labor Board during World War II.

He was the 31st Governor of Colorado from 1947 to 1950. Under his administration, a bill was enacted to combat specific diseases and public health units were established. Support was increased for workmen's compensation and schools. The state system of accounts and controls was improved, and the general fund for the state increased to a significant surplus.

Knous was nominated by President Harry S. Truman on March 1, 1950, to a seat on the United States District Court for the District of Colorado vacated by Judge John Foster Symes. He was confirmed by the United States Senate on April 4, 1950, and received his commission on April 7, 1950. He served as Chief Judge from 1954 to 1959. His service terminated on December 12, 1959, due to his death.

== Personal life ==
He eloped with Elsie Marie Grabow, a friend of his sister and a teacher, in 1916. They had three sons, all of whom fought in World War II.

- Robert Knous was a state senator and lieutenant governor of Colorado
- Merle Knous was a state district judge
- William Knous was a district attorney in Montrose

He died of a heart attack on December 12, 1959, and was buried at Fairmount Cemetery.

Party political offices
Preceded by Roy Best	Democratic nominee for Governor of Colorado; 1946, 1948	Succeeded by Walter Walford Johnson
Political offices
Preceded by John Charles Vivian	31st Governor of Colorado; 1947–1950	Succeeded by Walter Walford Johnson
Legal offices
Preceded by John Foster Symes	Judge of the United States District Court for the District of Colorado; 1950–1959	Succeeded by Olin Hatfield Chilson
Preceded by Office established	Chief Judge of the United States District Court for the District of Colorado; 1954–1959	Succeeded by Alfred A. Arraj
