= John Charles Vivian =

American politician (1887–1964)

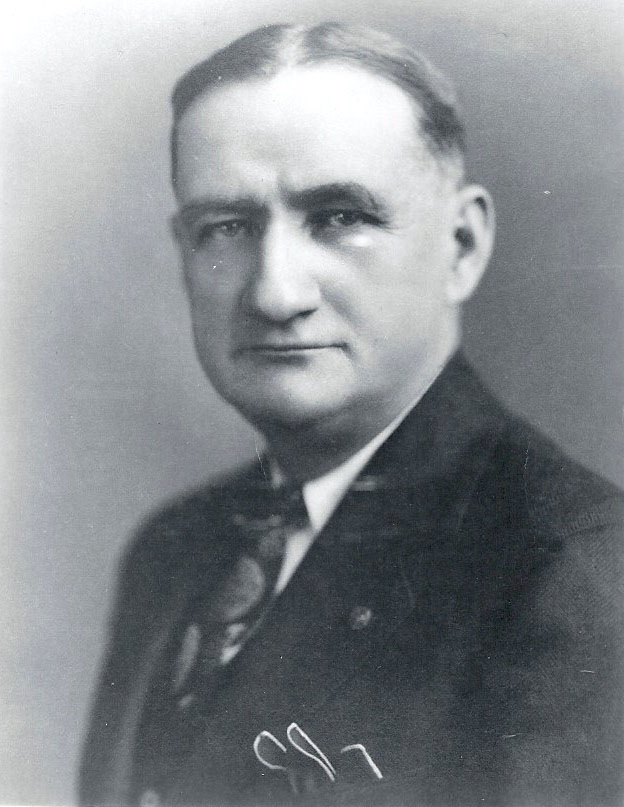

30th Governor of Colorado
- In office January 12, 1943 – January 14, 1947
- Lieutenant: William E. Higby
- Preceded by: Ralph L. Carr
- Succeeded by: William L. Knous

28th Lieutenant Governor of Colorado
- In office January 10, 1939 – January 12, 1943
- Governor: Ralph L. Carr
- Preceded by: Frank J. Hayes
- Succeeded by: William E. Higby

Personal details
- Born: June 30, 1887 Golden, Colorado, U.S.
- Died: February 10, 1964 (aged 76) Golden, Colorado, U.S.
- Party: Republican
- Spouse: Maude Charlotte Kleyn Vivian (m.1925)
- Education: University of Colorado

John Charles Vivian (June 30, 1887 – February 10, 1964) was an American attorney, journalist, and Republican politician who served as the 30th governor of the state of Colorado from 1943 to 1947. He was the first lieutenant governor of Colorado to be elected governor.

John Charles Vivian was born in Golden, Colorado, on June 30, 1887. The Vivian family was very prominent in Republican politics, of Cornish origin. Vivian received a Bachelor of Arts degree from the University of Colorado in 1909 and a Bachelor of Laws degree from the University of Denver School of Law in 1913. Vivian married Maude Charlotte Kleyn, a professor from the University of Michigan School of Music. Vivian served in the United States Marines during World War I and became the Jefferson County Attorney in 1922.

John Vivian was elected Lieutenant Governor of Colorado in 1938. In 1942, Republican Party officials decided to nominate Vivian for governor instead of incumbent Colorado Governor Ralph Lawrence Carr, who had angered many with his opposition to the internment of Japanese-American citizens. Vivian was elected governor in 1942 and was reelected in 1944. Governor Vivian was a staunch fiscal conservative in both public policy and his personal life. He was labeled "our spend nothing governor" by both opponents and supporters.

Vivian died in Golden, Colorado, on February 10, 1964, at the age of seventy-six.

== See also ==
- History of Colorado
- Law and government of Colorado
- List of governors of Colorado
- State of Colorado

Party political offices
Preceded by Ralph Lawrence Carr	Republican nominee for Governor of Colorado; 1942, 1944	Succeeded by Leon Lavington
Political offices
Preceded by Frank J. Hayes	Lieutenant Governor of Colorado; 1939–1943	Succeeded by William E. Higby
Preceded by Ralph Lawrence Carr	Governor of Colorado; 1943–1947	Succeeded by William Lee Knous
