= All You Had to Do Was Stay =

2014 song by Taylor Swift

Song by Taylor Swift

from the album 1989
- Written: January 2013
- Released: October 27, 2014
- Studio: Conway Recording (Los Angeles)
- Genre: Synth-pop
- Length: 3:13
- Songwriters: Taylor Swift; Max Martin
- Producers: Max Martin; Shellback; Mattman & Robin

Audio video
- "All You Had to Do Was Stay" on YouTube

"All You Had to Do Was Stay (Taylor's Version)"

Song by Taylor Swift

from the album 1989 (Taylor's Version)
- Released: October 23, 2023
- Studio: Prime Recording (Nashville)
- Length: 3:13
- Songwriters: Taylor Swift; Max Martin
- Producers: Taylor Swift; Christopher Rowe

Lyric video
- "All You Had to Do Was Stay (Taylor's Version)" on YouTube

"All You Had to Do Was Stay" is a song by the American singer-songwriter Taylor Swift from her fifth studio album, 1989 (2014). Swift wrote the song with Max Martin, who produced it with Shellback and Mattman & Robin. The lyrics were inspired by a dream where Swift asked an ex-lover to stay when he was leaving, and the track's refrain incorporates her high-pitched voice shouting "stay". Musically, the synth-pop song incorporates an electronic groove consisting of dense synths, drum pads, and processed backing vocals.

In reviews of 1989, some critics praised the production of "All You Had to Do Was Stay" as catchy, but some others found the track weak and generic. Billboard included the song in their 2017 list of the "100 Best Deep Cuts by 21st Century Pop Stars". Commercially, the track charted in Australia and Canada, receiving certifications in both countries along with New Zealand and the United States. Following a 2019 dispute over the ownership of her master recordings, Swift re-recorded the song as "All You Had to Do Was Stay (Taylor's Version)" for the re-recorded album 1989 (Taylor's Version) (2023).

== Background and development ==
Taylor Swift had identified as a country musician until her fourth studio album, Red (2012). It incorporates eclectic pop and rock styles beyond the country stylings of Swift's previous albums, which led to critics questioning her country-music identity. Swift began writing songs for her fifth studio album in mid-2013 while touring on the Red Tour. Inspired by 1980s synth-pop, she named the album 1989 after her birth year to signify an artistic reinvention: she described it as her first "official pop album".

On 1989, Swift worked with Max Martin as executive producers. Martin and Shellback produced seven of the 13 tracks for 1989's standard edition. The track "All You Had to Do Was Stay" was additionally produced by Mattman & Robin. Speaking about the song's inspiration, Swift told GQ that it originated from a dream where she asked an ex-lover not to leave when he "showed up at [her] door, [and] knocked on the door". She said how the idea translated into the song's refrain: "I opened it up and I was about ready to launch into the perfect thing to say. [...] Instead, all that would come out of my mouth was that high-pitch chorus of people singing 'Stay!'" She recalled that the multiple "Stay! Stay! Stay!" was "mortifying" but "kind of a cool vocal part". The track was written in January 2013.

== Production and composition ==
Swift wrote "All You Had to Do Was Stay" with Martin, who additionally programmed it. The song's producers played keyboards, Shellback and Mattman & Robin played guitars, and the latter played bass and drums. The track was recorded by Sam Holland, assisted by Cory Bice, at Conway Recording Studios in Los Angeles. John Hanes engineered the song, and Serban Ghenea mixed it at MixStar Studios in Virginia Beach, Virginia.

"All You Had to Do Was Stay" is a synth-pop track. It begins with what the musicologist James E. Perone described as a "1967-era backward tape manipulation" that recalls psychedelic music. The song's production is aligned with 1980s musical stylings, such as an electronic groove consisting of dense synths, drum pads, and processed backing vocals. Lyrically, "All You Had to Do Was Stay" is a breakup song that samples Swift singing the word, "stay", in a high pitch throughout, which is blended into the instrumental. Swift's character tells an ex-lover that she will not let him back into her life. Her vocals on the track are heavily processed; The New York Times' Jon Caramanica thought that the "bratty background chorus chants" exemplified this.

== Release ==
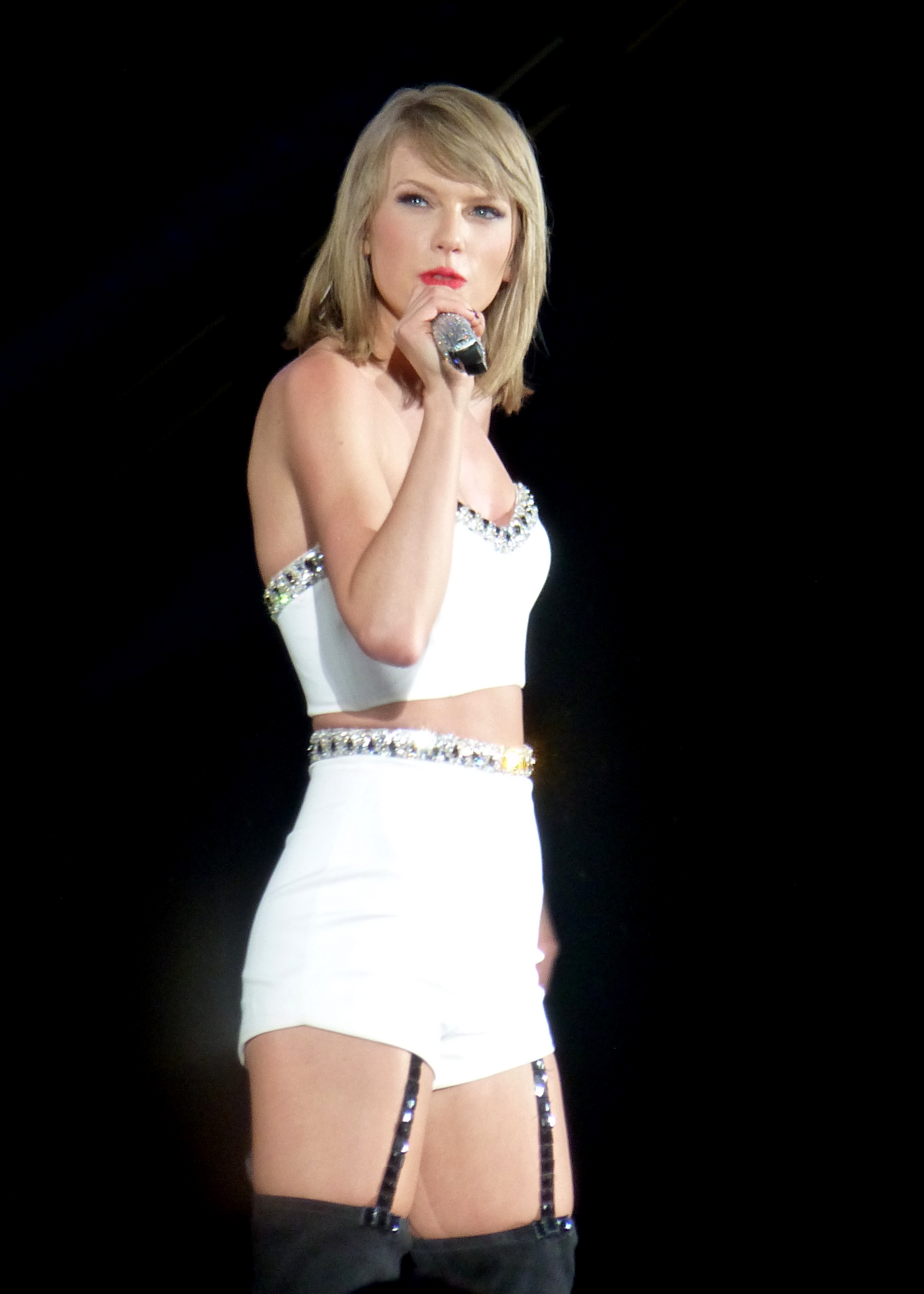
Swift performed "All You Had to Do Was Stay" on the 1989 World Tour in 2015.

"All You Had to Do Was Stay" was released as the fifth track on 1989 on October 27, 2014, by Big Machine Records. It charted at number 99 in Australia, number 92 in Canada, and number 14 on the United States Bubbling Under Hot 100. The song received a platinum certification in Australia, a silver certification in the United Kingdom, and gold certifications in New Zealand and the United States. A fan-made remix of "All You Had to Do Was Stay" containing sounds of a screaming goat became viral on the internet. Swift performed the song on most dates of the 1989 World Tour in 2015 but left it out of the set list of a few dates. Swift left "All You Had to Do Was Stay" out of the setlist of the Eras Tour (2023-2024) but performed it as a surprise song during the second Detroit show. Swift later performs the song in a mashup with "Right Where You Left Me" (2020) during the first Zurich show and "Out of the Woods" (2016) during the third Miami show.

After signing a new contract with Republic Records, Swift began re-recording her first six studio albums in November 2020. The decision followed a public 2019 dispute between Swift and the talent manager Scooter Braun, who acquired Big Machine Records, including the masters of Swift's albums released under the label. By re-recording the albums, Swift would have full ownership of the new masters, enabling her to control the licensing of her songs for commercial use in hopes of substituting the Big Machine–owned masters.

The re-recording of "All You Had to Do Was Stay", subtitled "Taylor's Version", was released as part of 1989's re-recording, 1989 (Taylor's Version), on October 27, 2023. Swift produced "All You Had to Do Was Stay (Taylor's Version)" with Christopher Rowe, who engineered her vocals. The re-recorded track reached the Billboard Global 200 (20) and individual charts for the countries of Canada (23) and New Zealand (30). In the United States, "All You Had to Do Was Stay (Taylor's Version)" debuted and peaked at number 20 on the Billboard Hot 100, where it extended Swift's record for the most top-40 chart entries by a female artist. The re-recording was certified gold in Australia.

== Critical reception ==
Rachel Sonis, writing for Time, called "All You Had to Do Was Stay" a "criminally underrated" song, applauding the story behind the song for being "vulnerable, relatable, and cutting", further elaborating that the song is "unmistakably Swiftian". Rob Sheffield of Rolling Stone called the song a "1989 banger that could have made an excellent single". He said that the track sounded quite like "Out of the Woods" but had a "livelier chorus and a stormier range of electro-Tay sound effects". Erin Browne of Vulture ranked the song as eight out of ten among Taylor's "track fives", saying that it is "definitely the most upbeat of all the track fives", and it "shows Taylor's growth from her first album to her fifth". Leanne Bayley of Glamour UK listed the song as one of 1989's highlights.

Alex Hopper of American Songwriter ranked "All You Had to Do Was Stay" sixth out of the album's 15 tracks, calling it "as fun and blithe as one could make a breakup song" and complimenting the contrast between emotional lyrics and "dance-inducing" sounds. Billboard placed the track at number 77 on its list of the 100 best songs by Swift published in 2023, saying that it had the most potentials of becoming a single out of the deep cuts on 1989. The magazine ranked it third on its 2017 list of the "100 Best Deep Cuts by 21st Century Pop Stars"; its editor Chris Payne highlighted the high-pitched "Stay!" that "captures the manic desperation of a sudden split" and "the way the chorus sprawls out and lets its hook run wild". Reviewing the re-recorded version, The Line of Best Fit's Kelsey Barnes praised Swift's vocals as having improved and said that it was one of the best tracks on 1989 (Taylor's Version).

Mixed reviews were from Slant Magazine's Annie Galvin, who described it as one of the "repetitive diary entries that have been churned through the Swedish pop-hit-making factory"; and PopMatters's Corey Baesley, who considered its sound "saccharine". Mikael Wood of the Los Angeles Times deemed "All You Had to Do Was Stay" a generic song that could have been mistaken for one sung by "Kelly Clarkson or Pink or Demi Lovato". The New Zealand Herald described the song as a "tiresome" depiction of early-20s "innocence, and sweet-natured wholesome fun" that left the impression of Swift being a "sweet 16 year old".

== Personnel ==
"All You Had to Do Was Stay" (2014)

- Taylor Swift – lead vocals, background vocals, songwriting
- Max Martin – production, songwriting, programming, keyboard
- Cory Bice – assistant recording engineer
- Sam Holland – recording
- Shellback – production, programming, guitar, keyboard
- Mattman & Robin – production, programming, bass, drums, percussion, guitar, keyboard
- John Hanes – engineering
- Serban Ghenea – mixing

"All You Had to Do Was Stay (Taylor's Version)" (2023)

- Taylor Swift – lead vocals, background vocals, songwriting, production
- Christopher Rowe – vocals engineering, production
- Dan Burns – synth bass programming, synth programming, additional engineering, drums programming
- Matt Billingslea – drums programming
- Brian Pruitt – drums programming
- Bryce Bordone – engineering
- Derek Garten – engineering, additional production, editing
- Serban Ghenea – mixing
- Max Martin – songwriting
- Mike Meadows – acoustic guitar, synth keyboards
- Amos Heller – bass
- Max Bernstein – electric guitar

== Charts ==
=== "All You Had to Do Was Stay" ===
Chart performance for "All You Had to Do Was Stay"
Chart (2014)	Peak position
Australia (ARIA)	99
Canada Hot 100 (Billboard)	92
US Bubbling Under Hot 100 (Billboard)	14

=== "All You Had to Do Was Stay (Taylor's Version)" ===
Chart performance for "All You Had to Do Was Stay (Taylor's Version)"
Chart (2023)	Peak position
Canada (Canadian Hot 100)	23
Global 200 (Billboard)	20
Greece International (IFPI)	38
New Zealand (Recorded Music NZ)	22
Philippines Songs (Billboard)	20
Sweden Heatseeker (Sverigetopplistan)	5
UK Streaming (OCC)	24
US Billboard Hot 100	20

== Certifications ==
Certifications for "All You Had to Do Was Stay"
Region	Certification	Certified units/sales
Australia (ARIA)	Platinum	70,000^{‡}
New Zealand (RMNZ)	Gold	15,000^{‡}
United Kingdom (BPI)	Silver	200,000^{‡}
United States (RIAA)	Gold	500,000^{‡}
^{‡} Sales+streaming figures based on certification alone.

Certifications for "All You Had to Do Was Stay (Taylor's Version)"
Region	Certification	Certified units/sales
Australia (ARIA)	Gold	35,000^{‡}
^{‡} Sales+streaming figures based on certification alone.
