= Taylor Swift sexual assault trial =

2017 defamation and assault trial in Colorado, United States

Mueller v. Swift
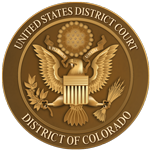
- Court: United States District Court for the District of Colorado
- Full case name: David Mueller v. Taylor Swift
- Decided: August 14, 2017

Court membership
- Judge sitting: William J. Martínez

Mueller v. Swift, commonly referred to as the Taylor Swift sexual assault trial, was a legal case held in the United States District Court for the District of Colorado. The trial involved David Mueller, a former radio DJ, filing for defamation against Taylor Swift, alleging that she had him wrongfully terminated following an incident at a 2013 meet-and-greet. Swift then counter-sued Mueller for battery and sexual assault, seeking a symbolic $1 in damages. The trial lasted one week, beginning on August 7, 2017, with both Mueller and Swift appearing in court. It concluded on the evening of August 14, 2017, with the jury ruling in Swift's favor and ordering Mueller to pay her $1.

The trial was subject to significant media attention by virtue of Swift's status as a high-profile celebrity. News and media outlets reported on the details of the case and the public's reaction daily. In a statement released by Swift following the trial, she revealed her reasoning for counter-suing was to empower other victims of sexual assault. In the statement, she also pledged to donate to organizations that help fund legal costs of sexual assault victims who choose to defend themselves.

== Background ==
=== Assault ===
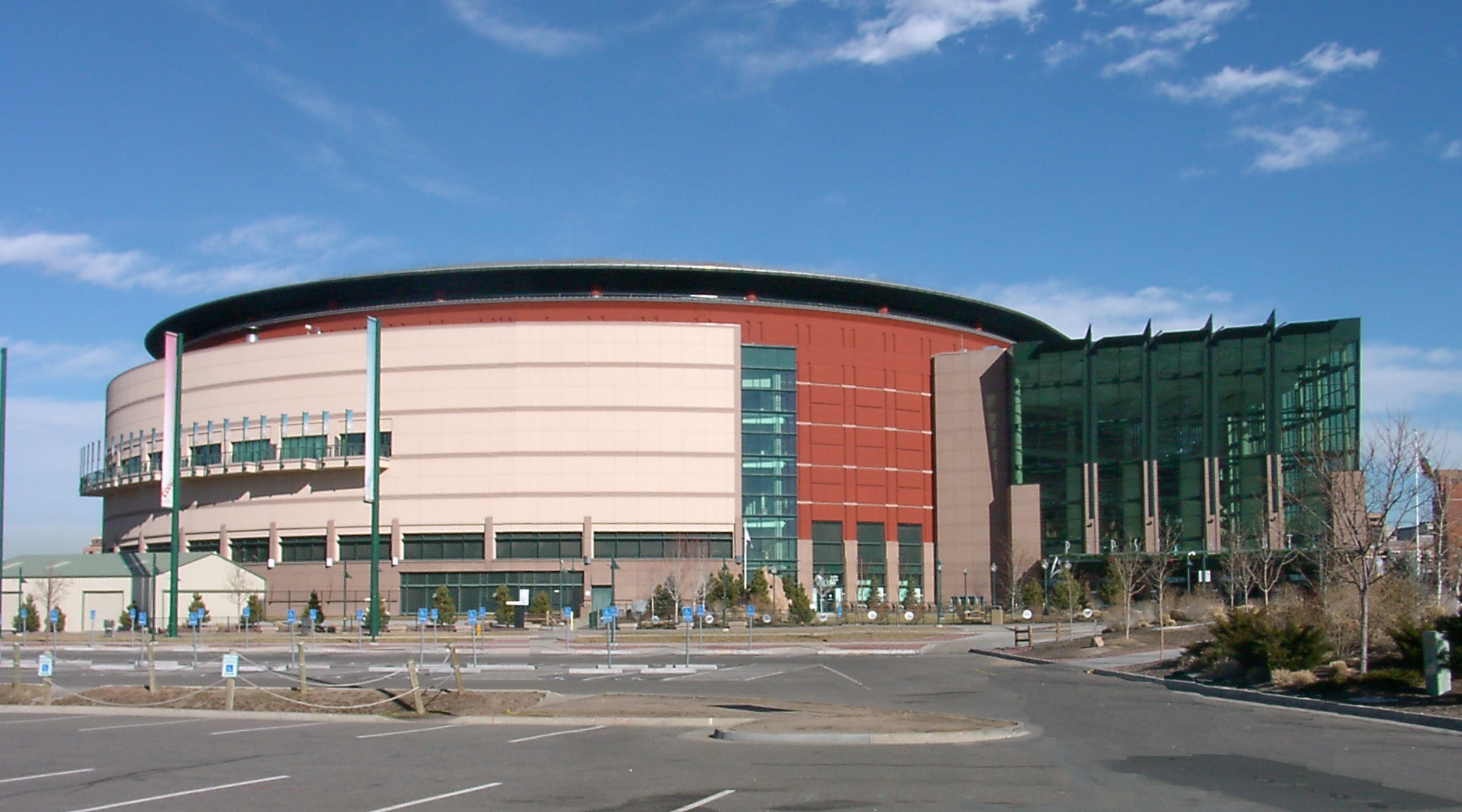
Pepsi Center, the location of the concert and meet-and-greet

On June 2, 2013, while on her third concert tour, Swift attended a pre-show meet-and-greet organized by KYGO radio before one of her concerts at the Pepsi Center in Denver, Colorado. Numerous fans and station employees were present at the event, where guests were invited to meet with Swift before taking photos with her. At the event, Swift posed for a photo with David Mueller, a radio employee at the time, and his then-girlfriend Shannon Melcher, also an employee of the station. Swift alleged that during the photograph, Mueller reached under her skirt and grabbed her buttocks. Immediately following the incident, once Mueller and Melcher had exited the room, Swift reported it to her mother, tour manager, the photographer and members of her security team.

Following the report, Swift's security team met with Mueller backstage and accused him of touching her inappropriately, which resulted in him being escorted from the concert. The incident was also reported to KYGO radio and Mueller was terminated shortly after they conducted their own investigation into the event.

=== Lawsuit ===
In September 2015, Mueller sued Swift for defamation, claiming that he had never touched Swift under her skirt. He alleged that as a result of the false claims he had wrongfully lost his job, his public image had been tarnished and he had been unjustifiably banned from any of Swift's future concerts. His lawsuit stated:

"The contention that Mr. Mueller lifted up Ms. Swift's skirt and grabbed her bottom, while standing with his girlfriend, in front of Ms. Swift's photographer and Ms. Swift's highly trained security personnel, during a company sponsored, VIP, backstage meet-and-greet, is nonsense, particularly given that Ms. Swift's skirt is in place and is not being lifted by Mr. Mueller's hand in the photograph".

Mueller sought approximately $3 million in lost income, stating he was earning approximately $150,000 per year at KYGO and radio careers "can span for over 20 years". In his lawsuit, he acknowledged that Swift had been assaulted but instead blamed KYGO employee Hershel Coomer, claiming it was a case of mistaken identity on the part of Swift and her team. His suit also named Frank Bell, Swift's radio promotions manager, and her mother Andrea.

The following month Swift filed a counter suit for battery and assault. In the suit she said that she was completely aware of who had assaulted her, naming Mueller as the individual who deliberately groped her buttock, inappropriately, and without her permission. The suit also stated that before starting at KYGO, Mueller had not worked on the radio since May 2006 and prior to this he had been dismissed twice from radio positions. In her suit, Swift demanded a jury trial and said that she would donate any money she won from the trial to charity organizations that protect women from sexual assault and other violent acts.

On July 26, 2016, Swift gave her deposition. She was granted her request that the meet-and-greet photo of her and Mueller from 2013 not be made publicly available, with the judge sealing the documents. The tabloid website TMZ later published the image. In her deposition Swift detailed her recount of the event claiming Mueller intentionally lifted his hand up her dress and groped her buttock. Swift described knowing it was no accident when she attempted to hustle away and his hand was still there, stating she had "never been so sure of anything" in her life.

On May 31, 2017, Judge William J. Martínez ruled that a jury would decide the outcome of the trial. Nearly two months later, on July 19, 2017, Mueller was sanctioned by Judge Martinez for destroying key evidence. In his deposition he revealed he only provided edited down audio files of his two-hour meeting with his former KYGO boss, Robert Call, which he had recorded on his phone. He claimed the full files had been damaged when he spilled coffee over his laptop keyboard and lost or thrown out other electronic devices.

== Trial ==
The trial began on August 7, 2017, with both Mueller and Swift and their respective legal teams present. On this day potential jurors were questioned regarding their objectivity towards the case. Candidates were asked about whether they were fans of either Swift or Mueller's music. Queries regarding Swift asked candidates whether they listened to her music, had attended her concerts, watched her videos and purchased an album of hers. Questions also examined whether or not jurors had ever been groped inappropriately or had ever been accused of touching someone else without their permission. Out of 60 a total of eight jurors were chosen, six women and two men.

The following day, both Swift and Mueller's lawyers gave their opening statements. Douglas Baldridge, Swift's attorney, led by stating Swift was "taking a stand for all women" and described the incident as assault in the workplace. Babe McFarland, Mueller's attorney, followed by claiming Mueller had not touched Swift inappropriately and that the incident had cost Mueller "[his] dream job". Following the opening statements Mueller gave his testimony, stating his hand came into contact with a part of her body that seemed to be her ribs.

On August 9, 2017, Swift's mother, Andrea, took the stand to detail her recollection of the incident. She described how she was sickened after being told of what had happened and when she saw the photo she could immediately tell her daughter was uncomfortable.

The following day Swift herself took the stand; her mother was unable to be present in court during her testimony. She testified for almost an hour describing how it was a "definite" and "very long" grab and spoke of her response to Mueller and his girlfriend following the photo. During her testimony, Swift was questioned by Mueller's attorney about her feelings regarding Mueller losing his job; she reminded the attorney that his client's job loss was his own fault:

"I didn't have a reaction to a strange person I didn't know losing his job... I'm not going to let you or your client make me feel in any way that this is my fault. Here we are years later, and I'm being blamed for the unfortunate events of his life that are the product of his decisions—not mine."

In the following days, numerous witnesses testified. On August 11, Stephanie Simbeck, Swift's photographer, took the stand to recount what she had seen when taking the photo. The next day, Greg Dent, Swift's former bodyguard, also testified. This was followed by Mueller's ex-girlfriend Shannon, who said she had not been watching the placement of Mueller's hands and described the photo as fast-paced. Ryan Kliesch, Mueller's KYGO 98.5 co-host, testified that he initially thought the allegations were a joke because he had not known of Mueller to be disrespectful towards women. On August 12, Martinez dismissed Mueller's $3 million case against Swift due to insufficient evidence that Swift had gotten him fired.

The trial concluded on August 14, 2017. Both legal teams gave their closing statements before the jury deliberated for hours. Ultimately the jury ruled that Mueller had assaulted Swift at the 2013 meet-and-greet, awarding her $1, which was paid in the form of a Sacagawea dollar coin. The jury also decided that Andrea Swift and Frank Bell had no impact on Mueller's termination.

== Public response ==
In the two-year lead-up to the trial, numerous news agencies wrote articles about the incident, fueling public interest.

During the trial, employees of Craftsy, a Denver-based crafting and design website located directly opposite the courtrooms, began to place post-it notes in the windows of their offices. The notes spelled out lyrics and song names from Swift's discography, including "Fearless", "I Knew You Were Trouble" and "Shake It Off" as signs of encouragement and support for the singer during her court appearances.

During Swift's Tampa Bay show of her Reputation Stadium Tour on August 14, 2018, the one-year anniversary of the trial, fans in the audience held up $1 bills in her honor as a symbol of support for her. Swift gave a speech about the victims of sexual assault before continuing with the tour set list, playing a mash up of "New Year's Day" and "Long Live".

In Swift's speech, she stated, "A year ago I was not playing in a sold-out stadium in Tampa, I was in a courtroom in Denver, Colorado. This is the day the jury sided in my favor and said that they believed me". She continued to speak about believing victims, apologizing to anyone who had not been believed or was too frightened to speak up for fear of not being believed. She closed her speech by thanking those who had supported her in what was a "really horrible part of [her] life" and contemplating where her life would have been had people not believed her.

== Aftermath ==
In December 2017, Swift was named as a "Silence Breaker" in Time magazine's Person of the Year issue. In the magazine, Swift gave her first recount of the assault and trial, detailing how it felt to testify and advice she would offer to fans. She also revealed that as of that date she had still not been paid the symbolic dollar she had won.

It has also been widely speculated that Swift made a reference to her assault trial in her "Look What You Made Me Do" music video, but this was never confirmed by Swift herself.

In the April 2019 issue of Elle, Swift once again spoke of her trial. In the piece, titled "30 things I learned before I turned 30", Swift stated, as her 13th lesson, that "It’s my opinion that in cases of sexual assault, I believe the victim." She credited this lesson to her own trial experience, drawing on what she described as the stigma many women feel when speaking up about assault.

Following the outcome of the trial, Mueller struggled for months to find a job in radio. In 2018, he was hired by KIX-92.7 hosting a morning show in Mississippi, presenting under the pseudonym Stonewall Jackson. The case was mentioned in the 2023 ski crash lawsuit against American actress Gwyneth Paltrow, who had countersued the plaintiff for $1. Paltrow won the suit.

== See also ==
- Taylor Swift masters dispute
- 2009 MTV Video Music Awards § Kanye West–Taylor Swift incident
- Taylor Swift–Ticketmaster controversy
- Taylor Swift vs Scooter Braun: Bad Blood
- Death of Ana Clara Benevides – Occurred at a Swift concert in Rio
- Taylor Swift deepfake pornography controversy
