= Live from Clear Channel Stripped 2008 =

Live album by Taylor Swift
- Released: April 24, 2020
- Recorded: June 8, 2008
- Length: 27:55
- Labels: Big Machine; Apollo A-1 LLC
- Producers: Scott Borchetta; Evan Harrison; Taylor Swift

Taylor Swift chronology
Lover (2019)	Live from Clear Channel Stripped 2008 (2020)	Folklore (2020)

Live from Clear Channel Stripped 2008 is the second live album by the American singer-songwriter Taylor Swift. It was released on April 24, 2020, by Big Machine Records, without Swift's approval. The album was recorded in 2008 but was not released until after the masters to her older music had changed ownership in the 2019 acquisition of Big Machine by American media proprietor Scooter Braun. Swift denounced Live from Clear Channel on her social media accounts, calling it "shameless greed in the time of coronavirus," and asked fans not to buy or stream the album. Earning only 33 units in its first week in the United States, the live album was unsuccessful and did not enter any domestic charts.

== Background and release ==
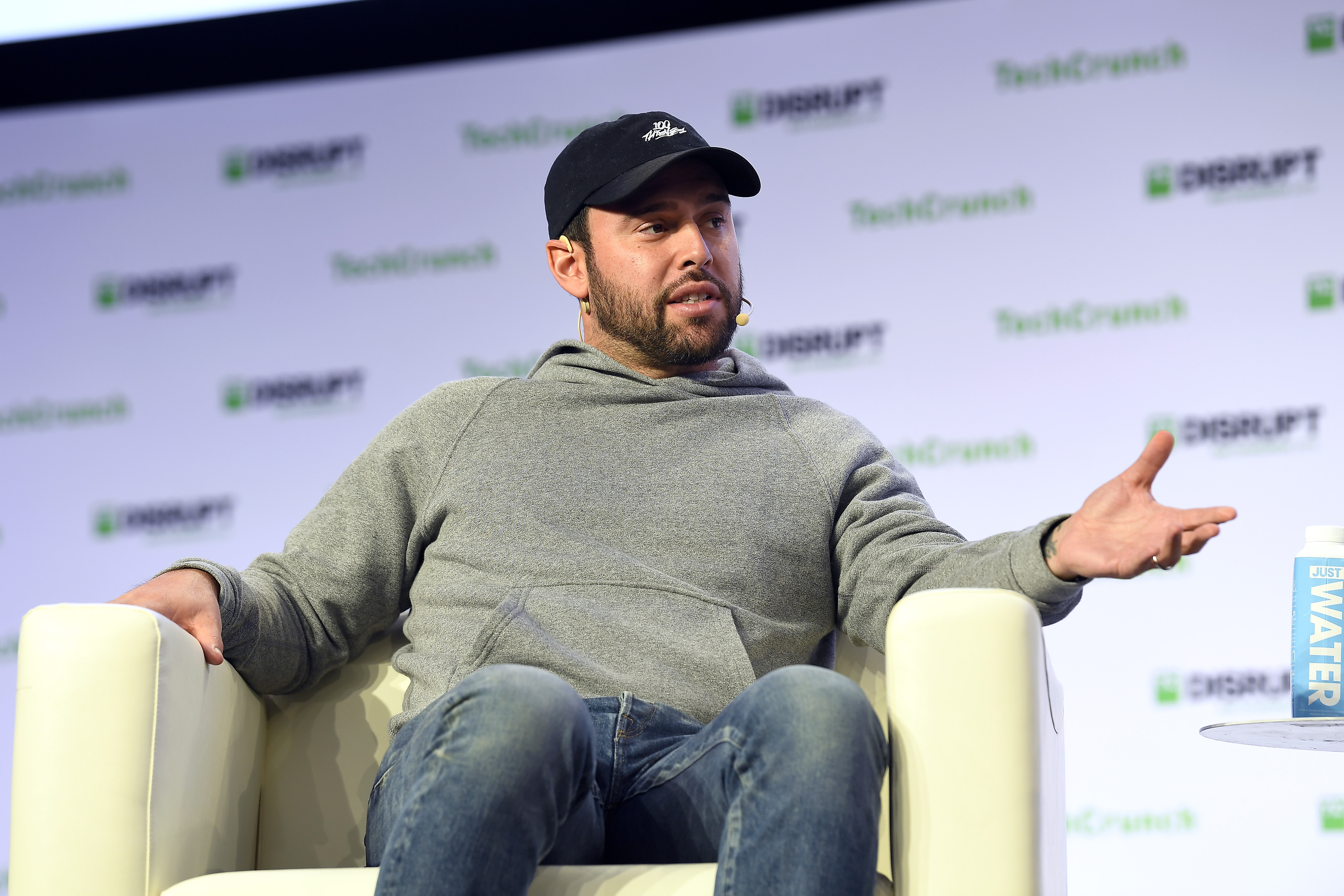
Scooter Braun purchased Big Machine in 2019 and became the owner of the masters of Swift's pre-2018 albums. Big Machine, under Braun, released Live from Clear Channel Stripped 2008.

This release is not approved by me. It looks to me like Scooter Braun and his financial backers, 23 Capital, Alex Soros and the Soros family and the Carlyle Group have seen the latest balance sheets and realized that paying $330 million wasn't exactly a wise choice and they need money. In my opinion … Just another case of shameless greed in the time of coronavirus. So tasteless, but very transparent.

— Swift on her Instagram story, "Taylor Swift disowns new live album, calling it 'shameless greed'", The Guardian

The album was recorded shortly after the beginning of Swift's professional career, while she was promoting her second studio album, Fearless (2008). The album consists of songs from her first two studio albums and her second EP, Beautiful Eyes (2008). It was released on streaming platforms without any prior announcement on April 24, 2020. According to Swift, the recording was made during a 2008 Clear Channel affiliates' Internet-only performance when she was 18 years old. In a social media post, Swift stated that she did not authorize the release, calling it "just another case of shameless greed in the time of coronavirus. So tasteless, but very transparent." Swift's statement also mentioned Braun's financial backers: 23 Capital, The Carlyle Group, and Alexander Soros and the Soros family. Big Machine Records initially listed the record with a 2017 release date, but it was later adjusted to 2008 to reflect the fact that the recordings were available on Clear Channel websites in 2008.

Music critic Quinn Moreland from Pitchfork wrote that Live from Clear Channel is predictable, failing to match the standards of Swift's past work, and dubbed it a "cheap bootleg" and "a shameless cash-grab". Moreland commented that the unapproved release resembled "eerily similar" instances when fake or leaked music appears on streaming services without the concerned artists' authorization—releases where "scammers hold the reins and the real creator never sees a dime".

== Commercial performance ==
Live from Clear Channel Stripped 2008 sold 33 copies in the United States, and the YouTube audio videos of its eight tracks accumulated 6,000 views in its first three days. The commercial failure was attributed to Swift's denouncement of the album on her social media; the album did not enter any Billboard charts.

== Track listing ==
Live from Clear Channel Stripped 2008 track listing
No.	Title	Writer(s)	Length
1.	"Love Story"	Taylor Swift	3:41
2.	"Fearless"	Hillary Lindsey; Liz Rose; Swift	3:18
3.	"Beautiful Eyes"	Swift	2:56
4.	"Untouchable"	Swift; Cary Barlowe; Nathan Barlowe; Tommy Lee James	3:42
5.	"Teardrops on My Guitar"	Swift; Rose	3:16
6.	"Picture to Burn"	Swift; Rose	2:53
7.	"Should've Said No"	Swift	3:48
8.	"Change"	Swift	4:18
Total length:			27:55

== Personnel ==
- Taylor Swift – vocals, production, acoustic guitar (tracks: 2, 4), electric guitar (track 7)
- Scott Borchetta – production, executive production
- Ben Clark – banjo (tracks: 3, 5, 7, 8)
- Chris Costello – recording supervision (tracks: 1, 2, 3, 4, 5, 7, 8)
- Caitlin Evanson – fiddle, backing vocals (tracks: 1, 3, 5, 6, 7, 8)
- Evan Harrison – production, executive production
- Amos Heller – bass guitar (tracks: 1, 3, 5, 6, 7, 8)
- Mike Meadows – banjo (tracks: 3, 5, 7, 8)
- Grant Mickelson – acoustic guitar (tracks: 3, 5, 7, 8), bass guitar (track 6)
- Jonathan Russell – mastering (tracks: 1, 2, 3, 4, 5, 7, 8)
- Paul Sidoti – acoustic guitar (tracks: 1, 3, 5, 7), electric guitar (track 8); backing vocals (tracks: 1, 3, 5, 6, 7, 8)
- Al Wilson – drums (tracks: 1, 3, 5, 6, 7, 8)

== See also ==
- List of 2020 albums
