= Yael Cohen =

Canadian activist (born 1986)

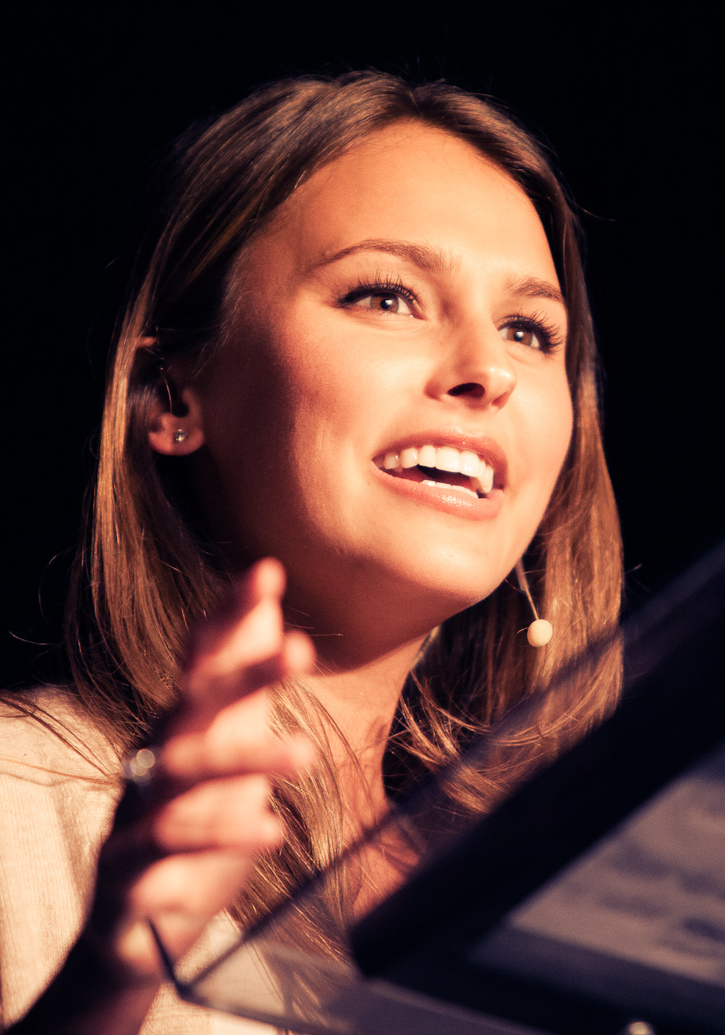
- Cohen Braun in 2012
- Born: Yael Cohen; 4 November 1986 (age 39); South Africa
- Education: University of British Columbia
- Occupation: Activist
- Years active: 2009–present
- Spouse: Scooter Braun (m. 2014; div. 2022)
- Children: 3

Yael Cohen (formerly Cohen Braun; born 4 November 1986) is a South African–born Canadian health activist. The former wife of Scooter Braun, she is the founder of the organization "Fuck Cancer", a nonprofit charity.

== Early life ==
Yael Cohen was born in South Africa to a Jewish family. In 1994, the family moved to Canada. She attended the University of British Columbia to study political science.

== Career ==
Cohen organized Fuck Cancer in 2009 after her mother was diagnosed with breast cancer. Fuck Cancer encourages millennials to have a conversation about early cancer detection. In 2016, Fuck Cancer collaborated with jewelry designer Jennifer Fisher to support cancer victims.

== Personal life ==
In 2013, Cohen began a relationship with music manager Scooter Braun. They married on July 6, 2014, and have three children. Cohen and Braun held a fundraiser for Kamala Harris during the 2020 Democratic primaries. In July 2021, it was reported that the couple had separated and that Braun had filed for divorce. The divorce was finalized in September 2022.
