= Taylor Swift vs Scooter Braun: Bad Blood =

2024 two-part documentary special

- Release poster
- Genre: Documentaries
- Starring: Taylor Swift; Scooter Braun; Justin Bieber; Kanye West
- Country of origin: United Kingdom
- Original language: English
- No. of episodes: 2

Production
- Production company: Optomen

Original release
- Network: Max
- Release: 21 June 2024

Taylor Swift vs Scooter Braun: Bad Blood is a two-part documentary about the feud between Taylor Swift and Scooter Braun which premiered on June 21, 2024. It was released on Max in the U.S., and Discovery+ in the United Kingdom. The two-part docuseries delves into the dispute between Swift and Braun, which began when Braun purchased the rights to Swift's first six studio albums for $300 million in 2019. The documentary provides an in-depth look at both sides of the controversy, highlighting issues of music ownership, gender dynamics in the industry, and the influence of fan communities.

== Episodes ==
=== "Taylor's Version" ===
The first episode explores Swift's perspective that the sale was conducted without her consultation and that she has since been blocked from buying back her masters. It starts by recounting her rise to fame through red carpet appearances and social media posts. Key events highlighted include Kanye West interrupting her at the 2009 VMAs, her feud with Justin Bieber, and her battles with sexism in the music industry. The episode also covers Swift's reaction to Braun purchasing her masters, the impact of Kim Kardashian's Snapchat video, and Swift's re-recording of her albums.

=== "Scooter's Version" ===
The second episode presents Braun's perspective. It highlights that while Braun legally purchased Swift's masters, Swift weaponized her fanbase against him, leading to significant online harassment. Legal experts suggest that Swift was aware of the deal, had opportunities to buy her masters and that her consent wasn't required for the sale of her masters. Additionally, Braun faced intense public scrutiny, which some participants believe contributed to his personal issues, including his divorce.

It is noted that Taylor Swift's father, Scott Swift, was a shareholder in Big Machine Records during the sale to Scooter Braun's company. However, he abstained from voting on the sale to avoid any conflict of interest. The episode also discusses how Taylor felt betrayed by the sale, despite her father's position, and underscores the personal and professional complexities involved in the dispute.

== See also ==
- 2009 MTV Video Music Awards
- Taylor Swift–Kanye West feud
- Taylor Swift sexual assault trial
- Taylor Swift–Ticketmaster controversy
- Death of Ana Clara Benevides
