= Taylor Swift masters dispute =

2019–2025 dispute over ownership of recordings

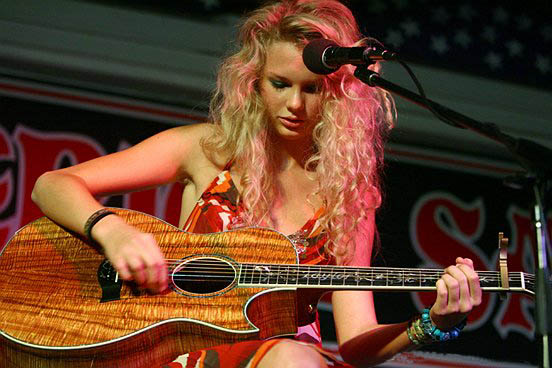
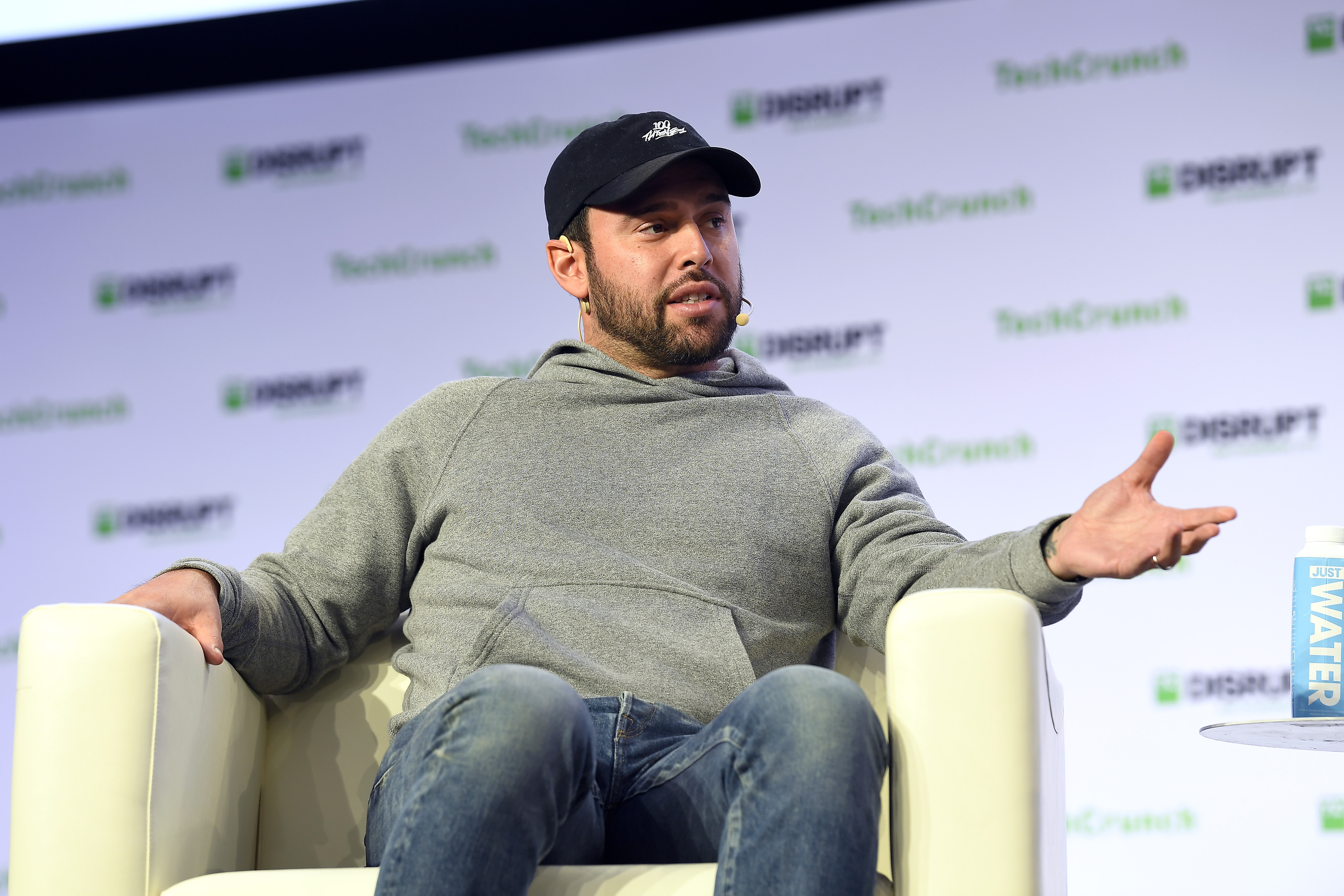
In 2005, 15-year-old Taylor Swift (left) signed a record deal with Big Machine Records that gave the label ownership of the masters of her first six studio albums. Scooter Braun's (right) 2019 purchase of Big Machine included those masters, which he sold to Shamrock Holdings the following year.

In June 2019, a dispute emerged between the American singer-songwriter Taylor Swift and her former record label, Big Machine Records, its founder Scott Borchetta, and its new owner Scooter Braun over the ownership of the masters of her first six studio albums. (Note: Namely, Taylor Swift (2006), Fearless (2008), Speak Now (2010), Red (2012), 1989 (2014) and Reputation (2017).) The private equity firm Shamrock Holdings acquired the masters in 2020, whereupon Swift re-recorded and released four of the albums from 2021 to 2023 to exert control over her music catalog. The dispute drew widespread media coverage and provoked discourse in the entertainment industry. Ultimately, Swift acquired the masters from Shamrock in 2025.

In November 2018, Swift signed a record deal with Republic Records after her Big Machine contract expired. (Note: The contract, signed in 2005, stated that Swift would henceforth release six studio albums under Big Machine. Therefore, following the cessation of the promotional activities for her sixth studio album, Reputation (2017), the contract officially expired in November 2018.) News media reported in June 2019 that Braun purchased Big Machine from Borchetta for $330 million, funded by various private equity firms. Braun had become the owner of all of the masters, music videos, and artworks copyrighted by Big Machine, including those of Swift's first six studio albums. In response, Swift stated she had tried to purchase the masters but Big Machine had offered unfavorable conditions, and she knew the label would sell them to someone else but did not expect Braun as the buyer, alleging him to be an "incessant, manipulative bully". Borchetta stated that Swift declined an opportunity to purchase the masters.

Consequently, Big Machine and Swift were embroiled in a series of disagreements leading to further friction; Swift alleged that the label blocked her from performing her songs at the 2019 American Music Awards and using them in her documentary Miss Americana (2020), while Big Machine released Live from Clear Channel Stripped 2008 (2020), an unreleased work by Swift, without her approval. Swift announced she would re-record the six albums and own the new masters herself. In October 2020, Braun sold the old masters to Shamrock, the Disney family's investment firm, (Note: Not to be confused with the Walt Disney Company. Shamrock is a private corporation founded by Roy E. Disney as the Disney family's investment firm. The family completely owns Shamrock and remains its sole investor.) for $405 million under the condition that he keep profiting from the masters. Swift expressed her disapproval again, rejected Shamrock's offer for an equity partnership, and released the re-recorded albums to commercial success and critical acclaim, supporting them with the Eras Tour, which became the highest-grossing concert tour of all time. The tracks "All Too Well (10 Minute Version)" (2021) and "Is It Over Now?" (2023) topped the Billboard Hot 100, breaking various records. In May 2025, Swift announced full ownership of her catalog after she purchased all the masters from Shamrock under terms she described as fair.

Various musicians, critics, politicians, and scholars supported Swift's stance in 2019, prompting a discourse on artists' rights, intellectual property, private equity, and industrial ethics. iHeartRadio, the largest radio network in the United States, replaced the older versions in its airplay with Swift's re-recorded tracks. Billboard named Swift the "Greatest Pop Star" of 2021 for the successful and unprecedented outcomes of her re-recording venture. A two-part documentary about the dispute, Taylor Swift vs Scooter Braun: Bad Blood, was released in 2024. When Swift reclaimed the masters in 2025, journalists considered it a watershed for musicians' rights and ownership of art.

== Background ==
=== Law ===
Under U.S. copyright law, a music release is subject to two separate copyrights: the copyright to the song or musical composition itself, and the copyright to the specific recording of that song, which is usually contained on a master. The master is the first recording of the music, from which copies are made for sales and distribution. The owner of the master, therefore, owns the copyright to all formats of the recording, such as digital versions for download or streaming, or physical versions such as CDs and vinyl LPs. A party who wishes to use or reproduce a recording must obtain a copyright license authorized by the master-owner. Before the emergence of digital platforms, musicians relied on record labels to promote their music through means such as airplay or physical distributions to retailers. Labels would typically require artists to give them the rights to the masters "in perpetuity". On the other hand, owning the musical work is referred to as the publishing rights, which covers the musical materials before it became a sound recording—the lyrics, melodies, sheet music, composition, and instrumental arrangements. Songwriters generally own the publishing rights, and are referred to as "publishers" of the music.

Under 17 U.S.C. § 114(b), the exclusive rights in a sound recording "do not extend to the making or duplication of another sound recording that consists entirely of an independent fixation of other sounds, even though such sounds imitate or simulate those in the copyrighted sound recording." This allows recording artists to "record exact replicas" of their original sound recordings even if they did not retain the rights to their masters, as long as they own the rights to the underlying compositions. Many recording contracts close this loophole through restrictive covenants that prohibit artists from re-recording music for a period of time after the contract is terminated.

=== Context ===
Taylor Swift is a singer-songwriter from West Reading, Pennsylvania, United States. In 2003, at age 13, she visited major record labels in Nashville, Tennessee, for record deals but was rejected. In 2004, Swift performed original songs at an RCA Records showcase, and received an artist development deal, following which she moved to Nashville and worked with experienced Music Row songwriters such as Troy Verges, Brett Beavers, Brett James, Mac McAnally, and the Warren Brothers. In 2005, she became the youngest artist (age 15) signed by the Sony/ATV Tree publishing house, but left the Sony-owned RCA Records due to her concerns that "development deals may shelve artists". In November 2004, Swift participated in an industry showcase at Nashville's Bluebird Café, where she was noticed by a DreamWorks Records executive, Scott Borchetta, who had an idea of establishing his own independent record label. Eventually, Swift signed a 13-year recording deal with Borchetta's new Nashville-based label, Big Machine Records, as its first recording artist. The deal gave Big Machine the ownership of the masters to Swift's first six albums in exchange for a cash advance.

From 2006 to 2017, Swift released six studio albums with Big Machine: Taylor Swift (2006), Fearless (2008), Speak Now (2010), Red (2012), 1989 (2014), and Reputation (2017), all of which were commercially lucrative and established Swift as one of the most successful music artists in history. Although Big Machine owned the masters, Swift retained the publishing rights to the albums due to her role as the main songwriter of all of the songs she had released under the label. This would allow her to re-record the songs in the future if she desired, as per the artist-label agreement that limits the artist from re-recording a song for a fixed period of time; Swift would not have been able to re-record her musical work had she not been a songwriter.

In August 2018, as per Billboard, Swift's attorney Donald Passman and her management team proposed to Big Machine Label Group (Note: The Big Machine Label Group encompasses Big Machine Records, The Valory Music Co., Nashville Harbor Records & Entertainment, Big Machine/John Varvatos Records, publishing company Big Machine Music, and digital radio station Big Machine Radio.) that the masters be sold back to Swift as their contract was nearing expiration; the label group responded that it would happen only if she renewed her recording contract with Big Machine, agreeing to create more albums under the label for the next decade. The two parties never arrived at an agreement.

Ultimately, Swift's contract with Big Machine Records expired in November 2018, following which she signed a new global contract with Republic Records, a New York-based label owned by Universal Music Group. Variety reported that Swift's catalog constituted around 80 percent of Big Machine's revenue. Swift revealed a negotiation as part of her Republic contract—any sale of Universal's shares in Spotify, the largest on-demand music streaming platform in the world, resulted in equity shares for all of Universal's artists on a non-recoupable basis. The contract also allowed Swift to fully own the albums distributed by the label—both the masters and the publishing rights—starting with her seventh studio album, Lover (2019), and as reported by Forbes, offered a royalty payment of 50 percent or more compared to the 10 to 15 percent Swift "likely" had been receiving from Big Machine.

== Dispute ==
=== Acquisition by Braun ===
Scooter and I have been aligned with 'big vision brings big results' from the very first time we met in 2010. Since then I have watched him build an incredible and diverse company that is a perfect complement to the Big Machine Label Group. Our artist-first spirit and combined roster of talent, executives, and assets is now a global force to be reckoned with. This is a very special day and the beginning of what is sure to be a fantastic partnership and historic run.

— Scott Borchetta on selling Big Machine to Scooter Braun

Scooter Braun is an American media proprietor, talent manager, and businessman known for managing the careers of music artists Justin Bieber, Ariana Grande, Demi Lovato, and Kanye West through his media company, SB Projects. In June 2019, The Wall Street Journal, followed by other mainstream media, reported that Braun's holding company, Ithaca Holdings LLC., had fully acquired Big Machine Label Group by purchasing it for an estimated $330 million. The purchase encompassed all aspects of Big Machine's business, including its client roster, distribution deals, publishing rights, and music masters, and was financed by American private equity companies such as the Carlyle Group, 23 Capital, and Soros Fund Management, all of which owned a stake in Ithaca. (Note: According to The New York Times, the Carlyle Group owned about one-third of Ithaca Holdings and contributed "a significant sum" for the purchase.) In a joint announcement, the companies stated that the buyout "creates one of the most powerful label, management, streaming, publishing and media companies by combining complimentary services, artists, executives and expertise". As part of the acquisition, the ownership of all of the masters and copyrights owned by Big Machine, including those of Swift's first six studio albums, transferred to Braun. Borchetta joined the Ithaca board of directors, acquiring a minority interest in Ithaca, and remained as the president and CEO of Big Machine.

=== Swift's response ===
For years I asked, pleaded for a chance to own my work. Instead I was given an opportunity to sign back up to Big Machine Records and 'earn' one album back at a time, one for every new one I turned in. ... I learned about Scooter Braun's purchase of my masters as it was announced to the world. All I could think about was the incessant, manipulative bullying I've received at his hands for years.

— Taylor Swift, Tumblr, June 30, 2019

On June 30, 2019, Big Machine announced via social media that the label group had been acquired by Braun, following which Swift denounced the acquisition on Tumblr the same day. She stated that she had tried to buy her masters for years, but was not given a chance unless she signed another contract that would require her to create six more albums under the label in exchange for the masters of the first six, which she felt was "unacceptable". While she knew that Big Machine was for sale, she said she was unaware that Braun—whom she described as an "incessant, manipulative bully"—would be the buyer: "Essentially, my musical legacy is about to lie in the hands of someone who tried to dismantle it". Swift highlighted Braun's involvement in the creation of Kanye West's music video for his 2016 single "Famous". Swift described the "Famous" video as "a revenge porn music video which strips my body naked". Swift also stated that Braun influenced Kim Kardashian, then married to West, to orchestrate an "illegally recorded" snippet of Swift's phone call with West, and had "two of [Braun's] clients" collude to bully Swift online, referring to a FaceTime screenshot of Bieber, West and Braun, posted to Bieber's Instagram after Kardashian released the snippet. Swift accused Borchetta of betraying her loyalty for selling the masters to Braun despite being aware of Braun's role in antagonizing Swift. Passman argued that Borchetta never gave Swift "an opportunity to purchase her masters, or the label, outright with a check in the way [Borchetta] is now apparently doing for others".

=== Borchetta's reply ===
In response, Borchetta published a blog post titled "It's Time for Some Truth" on the Big Machine website. On June 25, 2019, Big Machine shareholders and Braun's Ithaca Holdings held a phone call regarding the transaction. While Swift's father, Scott, was one of the label's minority shareholders (4 percent), he did not join the call due to a "very strict" non-disclosure agreement. A final call was held on June 28, when Scott Swift was represented by a lawyer from Swift's management company, 13 Management. Borchetta said he texted Swift on June 29, claiming that she was aware of Braun's transaction beforehand. He denied that Braun had been hostile toward Swift, and posted a text message he alleged Swift had sent before signing with Republic Records; in the message, Swift said while owning her masters was important to her, there were things that meant more in the long run, referring to a stipulation in her deal that would affect how artists under UMG recoup shares from Spotify. The authenticity of the message has not been verified. Borchetta also included a screenshot of a memo detailing contract negotiations between Swift and Big Machine Label Group. Swift said she would accept a seven year contract with Big Machine Records, on the condition that she was granted ownership of all Swift related materials. BMLG agreed, but asked for a ten year contract.

== Further strife ==
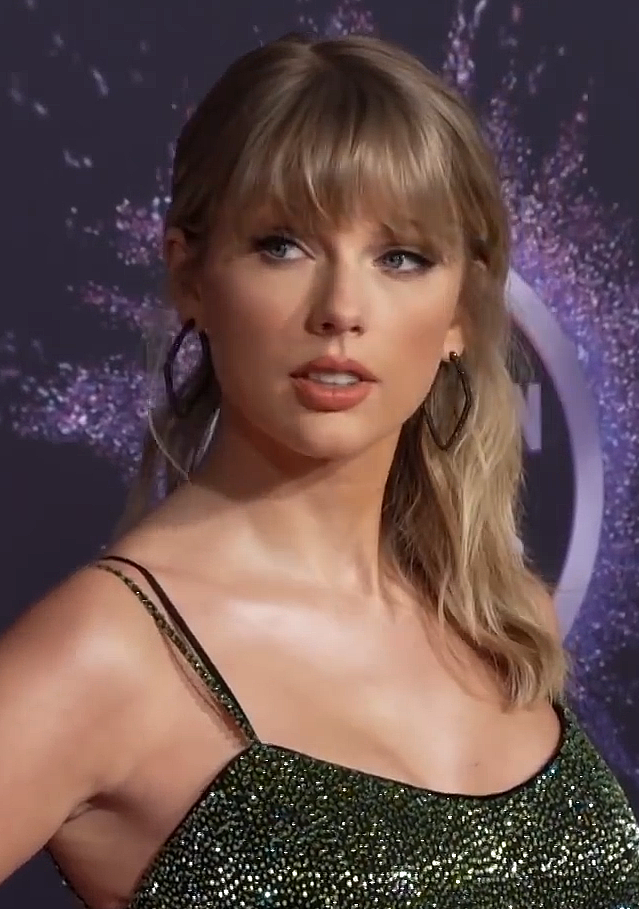
Swift at the American Music Awards of 2019

On November 14, 2019, Swift accused Braun and Borchetta of preventing her from performing her older songs at the American Music Awards of 2019 and using older material for her 2020 documentary Miss Americana. She said they were "exercising tyrannical control" over her music, and stated that Borchetta told her team that she would be allowed to use the music only if she agreed to not re-record "copycat versions" of her songs; Swift commented: "The message being sent to me is very clear. Basically, be a good little girl and shut up. Or you'll be punished."

In response, Big Machine rejected Swift's claim: "We have worked diligently to have a conversation about these matters with Taylor and her team to productively move forward. However, despite our persistent efforts to find a private and mutually satisfactory solution, Taylor made a unilateral decision last night to enlist her fanbase." On November 18, it issued a statement agreeing to grant all licenses of its artists' performances for streaming and rebroadcast on platforms approved by the American Music Awards (AMAs), without naming Swift. It also stated that Big Machine negotiated with the AMAs producer, Dick Clark Productions (DCP). DCP denied agreeing to issue any statement with Big Machine.

Swift's publicist Tree Paine released a statement the next day. Paine said Swift avoided performing her older songs at the Tmall Double Eleven Gala 2020, a Singles Day event in Shanghai, China, and sang only three songs from Lover, because "it was clear that Big Machine Label Group felt any televised performance of catalog songs violated her agreement", attaching a screenshot of a portion of an alleged email from Big Machine that reads: "Please be advised that [Big Machine] will not agree to issue licenses for existing recordings or waivers of its re-recording restrictions in connection with these two projects: The Netflix documentary and The Alibaba 'Double Eleven' event." Paine also denied Big Machine's statement that said Swift "has admitted to contractually owing millions of dollars and multiple assets" to the label, and stated that the label is attempting to deflect from "the $7.9 million of unpaid royalties" that the label owes to Swift "over several years", as assessed by "an independent, professional auditor". Swift performed six songs at the 2019 AMAs on November 24, 2019, four of which were from her first six albums, (Note: Swift performed a medley of "The Man" (2020), "Love Story" (2008), "I Knew You Were Trouble" (2012), "Blank Space" (2014), "Shake It Off" (2014) with singers Camila Cabello and Halsey, and "Lover" (2019) featuring American ballet dancer Misty Copeland. The shirt Swift wore for "The Man" and the piano she played for "Lover" displayed the titles of the six albums.) and received the Artist of the Decade award.

In April 2020, Big Machine released Live from Clear Channel Stripped 2008, a live album of Swift's performances at a 2008 radio show. Swift said she did not authorize the release, and dismissed it as "just another case of shameless greed in the time of Coronavirus". Live from Clear Channel Stripped 2008 earned only 33 units in the US and did not chart anywhere. From August 2019 to January 2020, Big Machine released 4,000 vinyl editions of the singles from Taylor Swift for the album's 13th anniversary, which was met with immediate backlash from Swift's supporters.

== Aftermath ==
Swift's solution to her situation was to create new recordings of all of the musical work in the six albums, using the publishing rights she retained, and to have the finished product sound as close to the original as possible. She announced in August 2019, on a special episode of CBS News Sunday Morning with American journalist Tracy Smith, that she would "re-record" and release the six albums to own the complete rights herself, as soon as her Big Machine contract allowed her to. (Note: Swift's recording contract with Big Machine stipulated that she would be able to re-record a song or an album only after five years since their respective release dates. For instance, Fearless was released on November 11, 2008, and thus it had been eligible for re-recording since November 11, 2013.) By re-recording, Swift is technically covering her own songs as new recordings, resulting in new masters she fully owns, enabling her to control the licensing of her songs for commercial use, known as synchronization, by evading the owners of the older masters and subsequently devaluing them.

=== Sale to Shamrock ===
In October 2020, Braun sold the masters, associated videos and artworks to Shamrock Holdings, an American private equity firm owned by Roy E. Disney's estate, for a reported $405 million. Swift stated that she attempted to negotiate with Braun, but that he offered her a chance to buy the masters back only if she signed an "ironclad" NDA that only allowed her to speak positively about Braun during the process; she refused to sign the NDA. She also stated that Braun mandated Shamrock not to notify her about the sale until it is complete, and that she further declined an offer by Shamrock to become an equity partner, on the grounds that Braun and Ithaca Holdings would continue to financially benefit from her work. Swift upheld her original decision and began the re-recording process in November 2020. In response, Shamrock released a statement: "We made this investment because we believe in the immense value and opportunity that comes with [Swift's] work. We fully respect and support her decision and, while we hoped to formally partner, we also knew [Swift's re-recording venture] was a possible outcome that we considered." According to a June 2023 Music Business Worldwide report, Braun and Ithaca earned a profit of $265 million from buying and selling the masters.

=== Re-recordings ===
Swift began releasing her re-recorded music in 2021. The re-recorded albums and songs are identified by the note "(Taylor's Version)" added to all of their titles, to distinguish them from the older recordings.

In February 2021, Swift announced that she had finished re-recording Fearless and released "Love Story (Taylor's Version)", a re-recording of the album's lead single "Love Story", on February 12. Fearless (Taylor's Version) was released on April 9 to rave reviews from music critics, who praised Swift's move to re-record her music, viewing it as an act of preservation of artists' rights. On September 15, following a viral TikTok trend involving "Wildest Dreams" (2015) that was gaining traction, the older recording of the song accumulated 735,000 plays on Spotify, marking the highest single-day streams ever for the song on the streaming platform. On September 17, Swift teased the re-recorded song's bridge as part of the said trend with a snippet on TikTok, captioning "if you guys want to use my version of wildest dreams for the slow zoom trend, here she is!". "Wildest Dreams (Taylor's Version)" was subsequently released to streaming platforms. Swift stated that she saw "Wildest Dreams" trending on TikTok and thought fans should have "[her] version" of the song. In its first four hours of availability, "Wildest Dreams (Taylor's Version)" amassed 2,003,391 Spotify streams, breaking the record the older "Wildest Dreams" had set a few days prior.

On November 12, 2021, Swift released Red (Taylor's Version), the re-recorded issue of Red, consisting of all 30 songs that were originally meant for the 2012 version. The album broke several sales, streaming, and chart records, and was met with widespread acclaim, becoming her highest-rated album by critics on Metacritic. Its closing track, "All Too Well (10 Minute Version) (Taylor's Version) (From the Vault)", scored Swift the eighth Billboard Hot 100 number-one song of her career and garnered the Guinness World Record for the longest song ever to top the chart. The song's producer Jack Antonoff told Rolling Stone that a 10-minute-long song topping the Hot 100 teaches artists to "not listen" to what the industry has to say. "This Love (Taylor's Version)", a track from 1989 (Taylor's Version), was released on May 6, 2022. In September 2022, Swift reportedly turned down an offer to headline the Super Bowl LVII halftime show in 2023, refusing to play the show until her re-recording process is finished.

In March 2023, ahead of the Eras Tour, Swift released a re-recording of the Speak Now deluxe edition track "If This Was a Movie", along with re-recordings of "Safe & Sound" and "Eyes Open" from The Hunger Games: Songs from District 12 and Beyond. At the tour's first Nashville show on May 5, Swift announced Speak Now (Taylor's Version), which was released on July 7. It broke the Spotify record for the most-single days streams for an album in 2023, made Swift the first woman to score 12 Billboard 200 number-one albums, and the fastest woman to collect 10 number-one albums in the UK, surpassing Madonna.

1989 (Taylor's Version) was released on October 27, 2023. Globally, it garnered the highest single-day streams for an album in 2023 on Spotify, and its tracks occupied the top six of the Billboard Global 200 concurrently, making Swift the first artist to do so. In the US, 1989 (Taylor's Version) became Swift's record-extending sixth album to sell one million copies in a single week, and surpassed Midnights, her tenth studio album, for the highest first-week vinyl sales of the 21st century. 1989 (Taylor's Version) debuted atop the Billboard 200 with over 1.6 million units, surpassing the original 1989's first-week figures by 400,000 units, and marked the largest album sales week of Swift's career and the 2020s decade. The vault tracks "Is It Over Now?", "Now That We Don't Talk", and "'Slut!'" occupied the top three spots of the Hot 100 in that order.

=== Press investigation ===
On November 16, 2020, Variety journalist Shirley Halperin reported, "some insiders speculate the value [of Swift's masters] could be as high as $450 million once certain earn-backs are factored in". According to a November 2021 report by Financial Times, Braun believed that Swift was "just bluffing" about re-recording. The newspaper stated that, after purchasing Big Machine, Braun began searching for buyers for the masters of Swift's back catalog, and that he and co-investors told potential buyers that Swift would not actually re-record the albums, calling her announcement an "empty threat"; Braun also told the buyers that Swift's posts about the dispute would only generate more publicity, boosting streams and downloads of the albums. Financial Times also alleged that the deal between Braun and Shamrock included "a post-purchase earnout to Braun and Carlyle Group, if sales and streams hit specific targets". On December 10, 2021, The New York Times published that the Carlyle Group contacted Braun and encouraged him to reach a cease-fire with Swift, such as a joint-venture partnership, to prevent her from re-recording, according to an undisclosed group of "four people close to the situation", three of whom said the firm was "unhappy to be dragged into the dispute in such a public way".

Business Insider reporter Anna Silman released an investigation exclusive in March 2022. Silman wrote that one of Swift's many reasons to detest Braun's procurement of the masters is his poor handling of the relationship between Justin Bieber and Selena Gomez, the latter being one of Swift's closest friends and vice versa. (Note: Swift and Gomez regard each other as one of their greatest friends and have expressed their admiration for each other numerous times in the media since 2008. Their friendship has been covered by media outlets and mainstream publications.) Silman also stated that Braun controlled news stories of several media outlets and blogs. American rapper Lil Twist told Silman that Braun used tabloid websites such as TMZ and Page Six to plant negative stories about the rapper. Silman stated that Braun refused to speak on the record, and that many others were afraid to go on record due to Braun's "rep for litigiousness". Additionally, she stated that Braun's lawyer, Marty Singer, threatened Business Insider several times over the investigation, claiming Silman is biased and has "deep ties to the Taylor Swift camp".

=== Sale of Ithaca ===
In April 2021, Braun merged Ithaca with South Korean entertainment company Hybe Corporation, which purchased Ithaca for a 100 percent stake through its wholly owned subsidiary, Hybe America. The deal, valued at $1 billion, brought the SB Projects and Big Machine rosters, including Bieber, Grande, Lovato, J Balvin, Thomas Rhett, Florida Georgia Line, and Lady A, together with K-pop acts like BTS, Tomorrow X Together, and Seventeen. Braun joined the board of Hybe. In a September 2022 interview with NPR's Jay Williams, Braun stated he regrets the way the Big Machine acquisition was handled, admitted he came from a "place of arrogance" when he assumed that he and Swift "could work things out", and that he learned "an important lesson". Braun also stated that he was forced to make the purchase under a "very strict NDA" and hence was not allowed to talk to anybody about it.

=== Reclamation by Swift ===
On May 30, 2025, Swift announced on her website that she had purchased the masters of her first six albums, as well as videos, concert films, art, photography, unreleased content and other related materials, after Shamrock offered her fairer terms. She attributed the success of the sale to the positive reception of her re-recordings and the Eras Tour. Swift clarified that she had already finished re-recording her debut album Taylor Swift but she had not "even re-recorded a quarter" of her sixth studio album Reputation; both the re-recording of Taylor Swift and the vault tracks of Reputation currently remain up for a possible release, but Swift was uncertain about when and how to carry them out. Swift thanked Shamrock for giving her the opportunity to purchase every aspect of her career work, "with no strings attached, no partnership, with full autonomy." The figures of the sale have not been disclosed.

== Reactions ==
The dispute was highly publicized, drawing numerous reactions and critiques. Swift's re-recordings were one of the most widely discussed and covered news topics of 2020–2021, and were described by media outlets as one of 2021's most prominent pop-culture events. Evening Standard called it "music's biggest feud", because "back catalogues regularly change hands behind the scenes, but almost never make headlines". Hashtags "#IStandWithTaylor" and "#WeStandWithTaylor" trended worldwide on Twitter following Swift's post. Billboard wrote, since the controversy, acts "lined up for Team Swift or Team Braun, creating the most public battle about an artists' [sic] masters in recent memory".

=== Entertainment industry ===
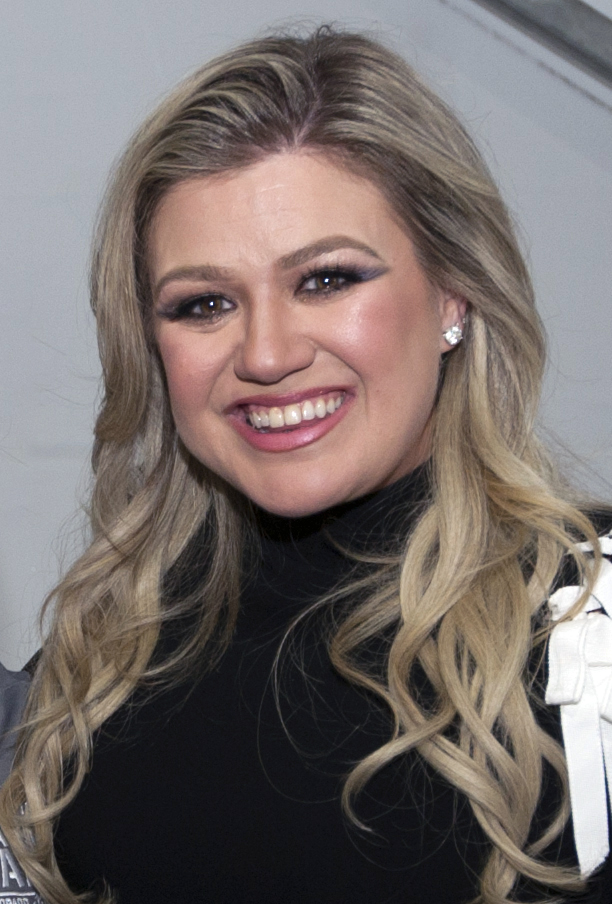
Kelly Clarkson urged Swift to re-record the albums.

Swift's response and social media posts sparked support from many of her contemporaries. Musicians who openly supported her include Dionne Warwick, Anne Murray, Cher, Selena Gomez, Halsey, Iggy Azalea, Sara Bareilles, Lily Allen, Tinashe, Ella Eyre, Hayley Kiyoko, Camila Cabello, Jordan Pruitt, Brendon Urie, Kelsea Ballerini, JoJo, Azealia Banks, The Regrettes, Echosmith, Jack Antonoff, Haim, Alessia Cara, Allie X, Hrvy, Gretchen Peters, Iza, Katy Perry, and Anita Baker, who agreed with Swift that artists should rightfully own their music. American musician Sky Ferreira supported Swift and told about her own battle over her masters: "the entertainment industry is filled with under qualified bullies & morons with way too much power for their own good". When questioned about his stance, English singer-songwriter Ed Sheeran said: "I have been speaking directly to [Swift], like I always do." American singer Kelly Clarkson, in a tweet, urged Swift to re-record the albums: "You should go in & re-record all the songs that you don't own the masters on exactly how you did them ... I'd buy all of the new versions just to prove a point." Various other singers unfollowed Braun on their social media accounts. Beside musicians, celebrities like Cara Delevingne, Heidi Montag, Sara Sampaio, Martha Hunt, Gigi Hadid, Antoni Porowski, Bobby Berk, Ruby Rose, Jameela Jamil, Joseph Kahn, Mike Birbiglia, and Mamrie Hart also supported Swift via social media posts.

A few musicians supported Braun, including Australian singer-songwriter Sia, American singer Ty Dolla Sign, and Braun's clients Bieber and Lovato. Lovato and Sia said they believe Braun is a "good man" and that his actions were not personal. American entertainer Todrick Hall, who was formerly a client of Braun, supported Swift and accused Braun of homophobia; Hall engaged in a back-and-forth argument with Lovato on Twitter. In an Instagram post, Bieber apologized to Swift for the FaceTime screenshot (with Braun and West) he posted in 2016 with a caption targeting her; however, Bieber defended Braun, saying Braun has supported Swift since she let Bieber be the opening act of her Fearless Tour and added "years have passed, we haven't crossed paths and gotten to communicate our differences, hurts or frustrations. So for you to take it to social media and get people to hate on Scooter isn't fair." Bieber's wife Hailey called him a "gentleman" under the post, which prompted Cara Delevingne to criticize the Biebers for what she considered as insincere amity. Grande, also a client of Braun, posted an Instagram story congratulating Braun on the purchase but deleted it after Swift posted her statement. David Geffen, a music executive whom Braun has often described as a mentor, supported Braun but said "only time will tell who made the wise decision".

=== Politicians ===
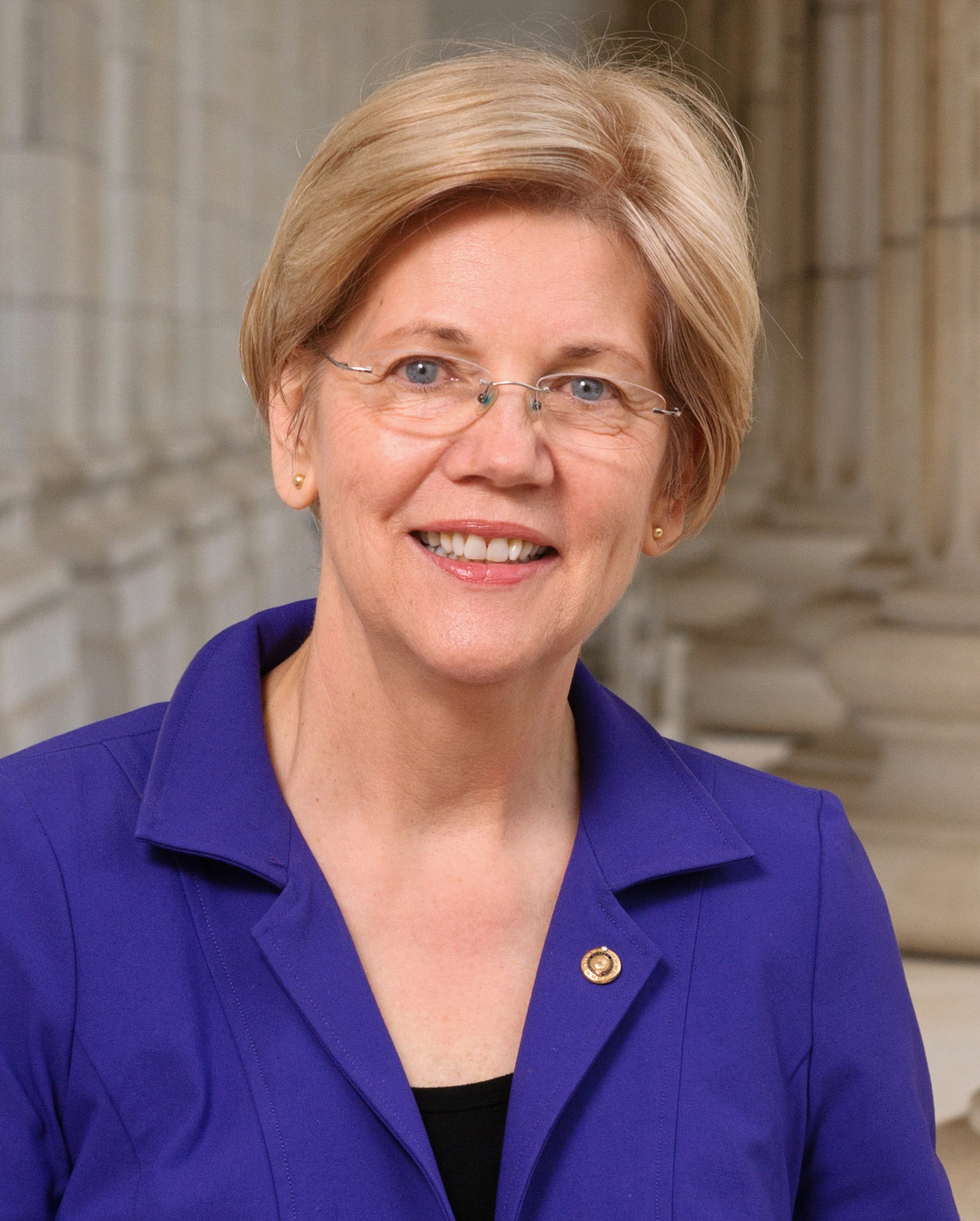
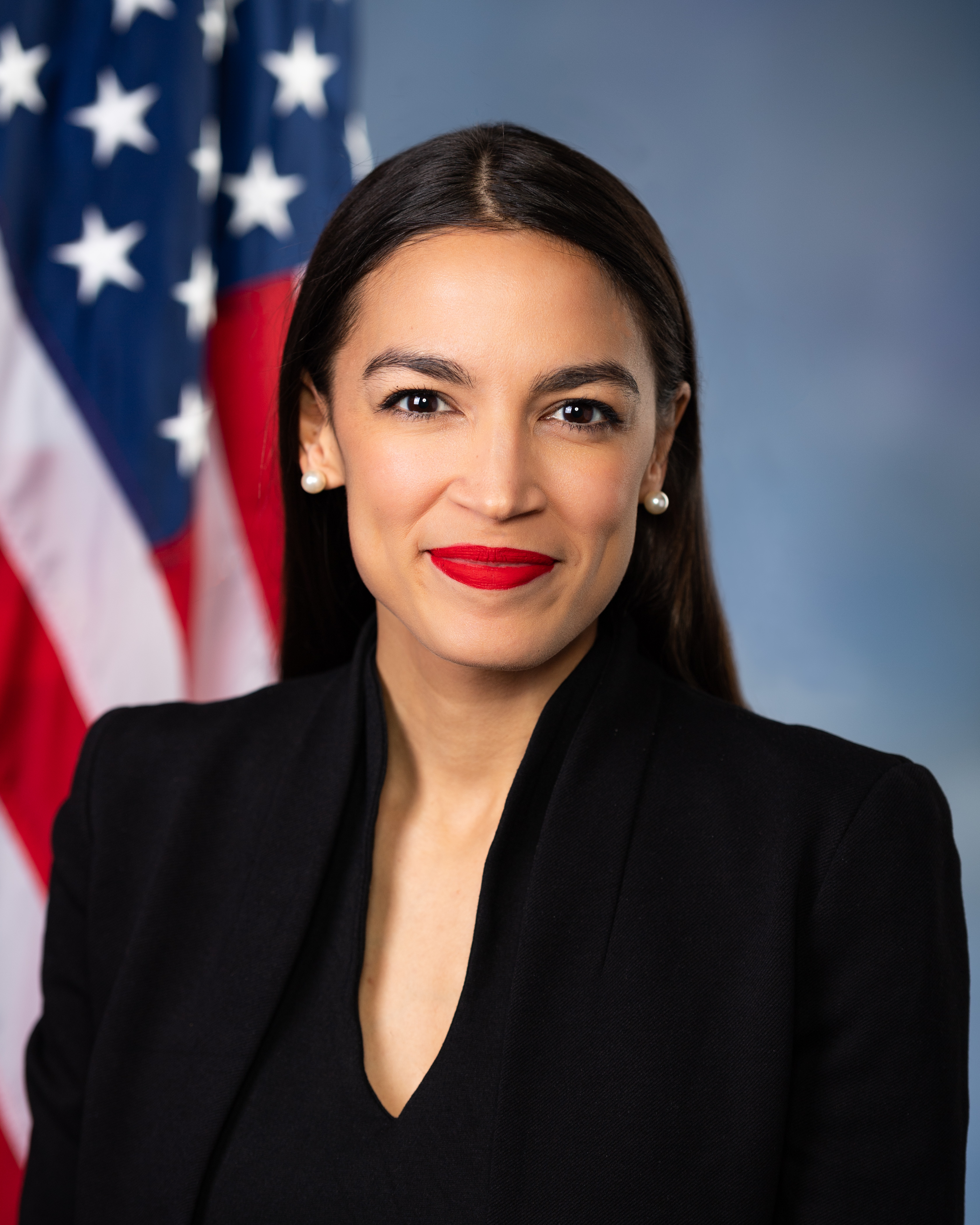
US Democratic politicians Elizabeth Warren (pictured left) and Alexandria Ocasio-Cortez (right) criticized the "predatory" purchases of creative businesses by private equity groups.

On November 19, 2019, US senator Elizabeth Warren, who was one of the Democratic candidates in the 2020 United States presidential election, stated on Twitter that Swift is "one of many" whose work has been threatened by private equity firms, who keep "gobbling up more and more of our economy, costing jobs and crushing entire industries". US representative Alexandria Ocasio-Cortez also sided with Swift. She tweeted: "Private equity groups' predatory practices actively hurt millions of Americans. Their leveraged buyouts have destroyed the lives of retail workers across the country, scrapping 1+ million jobs. Now they're holding [Swift's] own music hostage. They need to be reined in."

American businessman Glenn Youngkin was the former co-CEO of the Carlyle Group, the major sponsor in Braun's purchase of Big Machine and Swift's masters. Youngkin contested in the 2021 Virginia gubernatorial election as the Republican candidate for the office of the Governor of Virginia. On October 6, 2021, ahead of the election, former governor and Democratic candidate Terry McAuliffe launched a series of negative advertisements on Facebook, Instagram, and Google Search, tying Youngkin to the purchase. The ad included the slogan "#WeStandWithTaylor", a hashtag used by Swifties during the fallout of the dispute, and asked her supporters to vote for McAuliffe. Youngkin's spokesperson, Christian Martinez, stated "McAuliffe has reached the stage of desperation in his campaign where he's rolling out the most baseless attacks to see what sticks". Additionally, NPR highlighted a July 2021 report by the Associated Press that stated that McAuliffe himself had invested a minimum of $690,000 in Carlyle between 2007 and 2016. McAuliffe's spokesperson, Renzo Olivari, confirmed that McAuliffe was a "passive" Carlyle investor who by 2019, at the time of the sale of the masters, owned less than $5,000 in Carlyle stock.

Jared Polis, the 43rd governor of Colorado, mentioned Swift's re-recording venture as a highlight of 2021 in his annual gubernatorial address on January 14, 2022, and sang the chorus of "22 (Taylor's Version)" in reference to the new year of 2022.

=== Music critics ===
Publications highlighted Swift's public opposition to the acquisition as trailblazing: while the issue of master ownership and the conflicts between record labels and artists such as George Michael, Prince, the Beatles, Janet Jackson, and Def Leppard have been prevalent, Swift was one of the few to make it public. Rolling Stone journalists described the dispute as one of the 50 "most important moments" of the 2010s. Dominic Rushe of The Guardian said Swift's situation hinted at a change in the digital music era, where artists are more informed of their ownership and would not rely on record labels for marketing as heavily as in the past. Recognizing the visibility she brought to "one of the music industry's longest standing issues", Pitchfork critic Sam Sodomsky said Swift "is also so huge—not just an artist but a brand—that she can enact change by wielding the leverage of the reliability of her success", and that when she makes a statement, it is "financially lucrative for the industry to listen". The Evening Standard's Katie Rosseinsky wrote: "It is not just another celebrity feud, this could have wide-reaching repercussions for the music industry."

The New York Times, The A.V. Club and MarketWatch felt Swift's criticism targeted private equity firms, highlighting her mention of the Carlyle Group in her social media posts. The New York Times said: "At a time of public outrage over corporate greed and a heightened awareness of gender-based power dynamics, the 29-year-old Ms. Swift was able to turn a commercial dispute into a cause célèbre." Meera Jagannathan of MarketWatch described the Carlyle Group as a "powerful and politically connected" firm based in Washington, D.C., whose investments constitute a global portfolio of 272 companies, including Supreme, Dunkin' Brands, and many aerospace and defense companies.

Critical commentary on Swift's decision to re-record remained favorable as well. Variety's Chris Willman wrote that Swift's highly publicized move to re-record her back catalog would inspire other artists to "further deputize or weaponize fans in their own business disputes", unlike comparatively less successful attempts by her contemporaries to own their music. The Atlantic's Spencer Kornhaber opined that the re-recordings have been "a dazzling victory lap", disproving industry observers who had doubted Swift. Elle's Fawzia Khan and The New Yorker's Carrie Battan hailed the "(Taylor's Version)" tag attached to the re-recorded music as genius re-branding of Swift's back catalog. Charlotte Richards, writing for Money Marketing, said the situation helps understand "dangerous investing", such as Braun's. The New Zealand Herald reporter Lydia Burgham dubbed the move "ultimate middle finger to the bureaucracy of the music industry", while revealing how "even someone of Swift's star power cannot hold on to the rights to her recorded work." With the success of Red (Taylor's Version), Hannah Towey of Business Insider said "the Taylor's Version era is already sending shockwaves throughout the industry."

Unlike most artists when faced with this kind of injustice, Swift actually had the ability to stand up for herself, and in doing so, invoke meaningful dialogue and inspire change within the notoriously slow-moving music industry ... Re-recording a back catalogue of six full albums and respective secret bonus tracks, then developing a hugely successful campaign to drive loyal fans towards the new versions of their beloved albums—and away from the original master recordings, prompting a dip in streams that will be mimicked in the rights holders' income statement—is something only very, very few artists can do. Taylor Swift is, indeed, amongst that handful.

— Eilish Gilligan, Taylor Swift's Re-Recordings Expose The Music Industry's Chokehold On Intellectual Property, Refinery29

The Wall Street Journal journalist Neil Shah wrote, for using her back catalog in mass media, such as for commercials and movies, Swift can shut out Shamrock and Braun by directly lending the concerned song to the third party, approving the copyright license herself. Kate Dwyer of Marie Claire said the re-recorded albums free Swift from the sexist tabloid scrutiny of her private life that overshadowed her past works, by re-introducing listeners and critics to the same songs but without "as much gender bias", and that the audiences who "didn't believe she was a feminist before (for whatever, sexist reason) can't deny the feminist undertones of becoming the industry spokesperson for artists' rights."

"What Taylor Swift buying her masters means for her — and the music industry"

At a time when many artists are selling their catalogs for major money — from Bruce Springsteen and Bob Dylan to Katy Perry and Justin Bieber — ownership meant everything to [Swift]. This was personal.

And while it's not something that every act can afford or demand, it certainly makes a strong statement about the fundamental right of being in charge of the music that you create. For Swift, you can't really put a price on it — and she couldn't just shake it off.

As a woman especially, Swift felt bullied by the men in the industry who didn't take her seriously enough and sought to control her. She took a stand against them that, with her enormous influence, greatly impacted and emboldened her largely female fan base.

— Church Arnold, The New York Post

Following Swift's 2025 purchase of the masters, various publications emphasized what it meant for the industry. Collider described the news as a "shockwave" throughout the industry. Music journalist Rob Sheffield commented in Rolling Stone, "Swift owning her life's work is a historic victory with enormous ramifications for other artists, and the entire music world." The Indian Express stated, "The industry remains forever changed, with artists seeking to reclaim ownership of their body of work or agency over its exhibition." Bloomberg News writer Lucas Shaw highlighted that most music industry executives dismissed Swift's re-recording strategy, assuming most fans "wouldn't care", whereas Swift "channeled her frustration into the most productive stretch of her career, buttressed by the best marketing campaign in the history of the music business", leading her to regain control of the masters.

=== Legal scholars ===
Various lawyers and law firms have published their analyses of the controversy. The majority highlighted the lack of legal grounds and that a lawsuit is not viable. Susan H. Hilderley, music attorney at the UCLA School of Law, told The Washington Post that Swift not owning her masters is "nothing out of the ordinary". Hilderley noted Swift was an unknown artist when she signed her record deal and that signing off the masters to the record label is the "kind of terms" usually followed in artist-label agreements. In a similar vein, Erin M. Jacobson, a music attorney specializing in artist-label negotiations, said on CBC News that "the structure of a label owning the master has been in place for such a long time that a lot of people are just used to that". She affirmed that Swift has no legal recourse on the contract but can effect change in the music industry and benefit all artists.

The Hollywood Reporter consulted music lawyers Howard King and Derek Crownover regarding the controversy; King said Swift would not sue Braun or the label because of the "personal" nature of the dispute—her predicament being not the sale itself but that Braun is the buyer—having no legal recourse. In agreement, Crownover said: "from the satellite view, I don't see any legal ramifications that could come of this, unless there were restrictions on the sale of the masters to third parties." James Jeffries-Chung of Norton Rose Fulbright asserted Shamrock cannot prevent Swift from re-recording her music by any legal measure since she is the publisher of her songs and that all they can hope is "listeners may be less interested in hearing modern takes of songs they enjoyed a decade ago and stick with the originals."

Any time Taylor brings attention to an issue, it gets magnified ... She has a very loud megaphone and she's not afraid to use it. She's had great success in effectuating change.

— James Sammataro, music attorney, The Hollywood Reporter

Many suggested that Swift's moves will bring about systemic changes in the music industry and artist-label relationships. Meredith Rose, senior policy counsel at Public Knowledge, wrote in her American Bar Association post that "if Swift—who is, without exaggeration, one of the biggest powerhouse pop stars of an entire generation—can't get her own masters back, who could? Turns out, almost nobody." According to Tonya Butler, professor and chair of the Music Business Management Department at Berklee College of Music, "regardless of the reasons why [Swift is] re-recording, whether it's spite or good business, the fact she is bringing to attention the re-recording restriction agreement alone makes the whole controversy valuable." McBrayer's Peter J. Rosene stated that each "Taylor's Version" album lowers the value of the master of its respective original held by Shamrock and predicted that the sales of the re-recordings "might, in fact, outperform the original albums." Justin Tilghman of the University of Georgia School of Law opined that the clause that prohibits an artist from re-recording their own songs for a designated period of time can "go too far and, in effect, violate the public policy the Framers had in mind when drafting the Useful Art Clauses."

American author Steve Stoute said "you build it; we make you think that you own it; you act like you own it; but at the end of the day, we own it." He remarked that Swift's dilemma is a "painful" illustration of the fundamental issue with the music business that has been following a "sharecropping" model. According to professor R. Polk Wagner of the University of Pennsylvania Law School, Swift associating her lyrics with a range of goods and services through trademark applications represents her understanding that "she is bigger than the music". He added "it's more of a branding right, thinking of Taylor Swift as a conglomerate." Doug McMahon of Irish firm McCann Fitzgerald LLP posited that the controversy shows how "the bundle of related copyrights that exist in a piece of music can give rise to complex disputes" and upheld Swift's move to re-record as a "relatively novel solution", in regards to the copyright legislations in Ireland.

== Legacy ==
=== Recognition ===
At the 2019 Billboard Women in Music event, Swift was conferred the inaugural Woman of the Decade award for the 2010s. In her acceptance speech, Swift addressed Braun for the first time publicly, criticizing his "toxic male privilege" and the "unregulated world of private equity coming in and buying [artists'] music as if it's real estate—as if it's an app or a shoe line." She stated that none of the investors "bothered to contact me or my team directly—to perform their due diligence on their investment; on their investment in me. To ask how I might feel about the new owner of my art, the music I wrote, the videos I created, photos of me, my handwriting, my album designs."

In December 2021, Billboard recognized Swift as "The Greatest Pop Star of 2021", saying she "rewrote industry rules and had one of the most impactful years of her storied pop career without even releasing an entirely new album." The magazine stated that the "unequivocal success" of Fearless (Taylor's Version) and Red (Taylor's Version) prove the widespread acceptance of the recordings, which replaced the older versions as "the ones listeners will be digesting and caring about moving forward." The Recording Academy said the "Taylor's Versions" are a music trend that defined 2021. Swift and her re-recording venture were featured in a video montage by Vox summarizing major world events of the year. Rolling Stone listed Braun's purchase of Swift's masters as one of the 50 worst decisions made in music industry history, and noted Swift's role in shifting the public perception of the concept of re-recording or re-mastering.

The term "(Taylor's Version)" and its variants have since achieved cultural prominence as taglines. Organizations such as the Federal Bureau of Investigation (FBI) and National Football League (NFL) have since used or parodied the term in their promotional digital content.

=== Financial impact ===
The re-recordings were widely successful. The original Fearless was charting at number 157 on the US Billboard 200 chart before the impact of Fearless (Taylor's Version), after which the original dropped 19 percent in sales and fell off the chart completely, while the re-recording debuted at number one. Ben Sisario of The New York Times opined that Fearless (Taylor's Version) "accomplished what appeared to be one of Swift's goals: burying the original Fearless." This became a pattern: Each announcement of a Taylor's Version album caused a spike in interest in the original album, but upon release of the new recording, the original plummeted in consumption and exited the chart; the original Red dropped by 45 percent, Speak Now by 59 percent and 1989 by 44 percent, following the release of their respective re-recordings. In October 2023, Bloomberg News estimated the value of the four re-recordings to be $400 million.

The International Federation of the Phonographic Industry reported that Swift was the world's best-selling soloist and female artist of 2021. Forbes estimated her 2021 earnings to be US$52,000,000, and opined that Swift "recreating her catalog also sets [her] up for a potentially massive payday". Her publication rights over her first six albums were valued at $200 million in 2022. Rolling Stone reported in January 2022 that Swift was the highest-paid female musician of 2021, owing to Fearless (Taylor's Version) and Red (Taylor's Version), ahead of artists who released brand new albums that year. In December 2022, Billboard reiterated that Swift was the top earning musician overall in 2021, taking home an estimated $65.8 million, followed by English band the Rolling Stones ($55.5 million).

Following news of Swift's purchase of the masters, her entire discography experienced a surge in consumption, with a drastic increase in the streams of Swift's first six studio albums—the albums she purchased the masters for. Spotify shared the figures with The Hollywood Reporter, who reported that the streams of all the original versions of the six albums at least doubled on May 30, 2025, compared to their average daily streams from April 1 through May 29.

=== Synchronization ===
Every week, we get a dozen synch requests to use "Shake It Off" in some advertisement or "Blank Space" in some movie trailer, and we say no to every single one of them. And the reason I'm rerecording my music next year is because I do want my music to live on. I do want it to be in movies, I do want it to be in commercials. But I only want that if I own it.

— Swift to Billboard in 2019, Forbes

Swift had pointedly refused to authorize synchronization requests for the original versions of her songs from her first six albums, advising use of her re-recorded versions instead. American actor and Swift's brother, Austin, manages the licensing of her songs. A cover version of "Look What You Made Me Do" (2017), the lead single of Reputation, was featured in the opening credits of an episode (aired May 24, 2020) of spy thriller series Killing Eve. The artist credited as the performer of the cover, Jack Leopards & the Dolphin Club, had no documented existence before the song's release. It was fronted by an unnamed male vocalist, speculated by some media outlets to be Austin, and was produced by Jack Antonoff and Nils Sjöberg, the latter being a pseudonym of Swift. Because Swift could not re-record Reputation at the time the episode aired, some believed that the cover version was Swift's way of bypassing the potential issues that would arise with Big Machine over licensing the copyright to Killing Eve. A copyright license is mandatory for using a song in a visual work; otherwise, the owner of the copyright is allowed to fine or press charges against the party who used the song unlicensed.

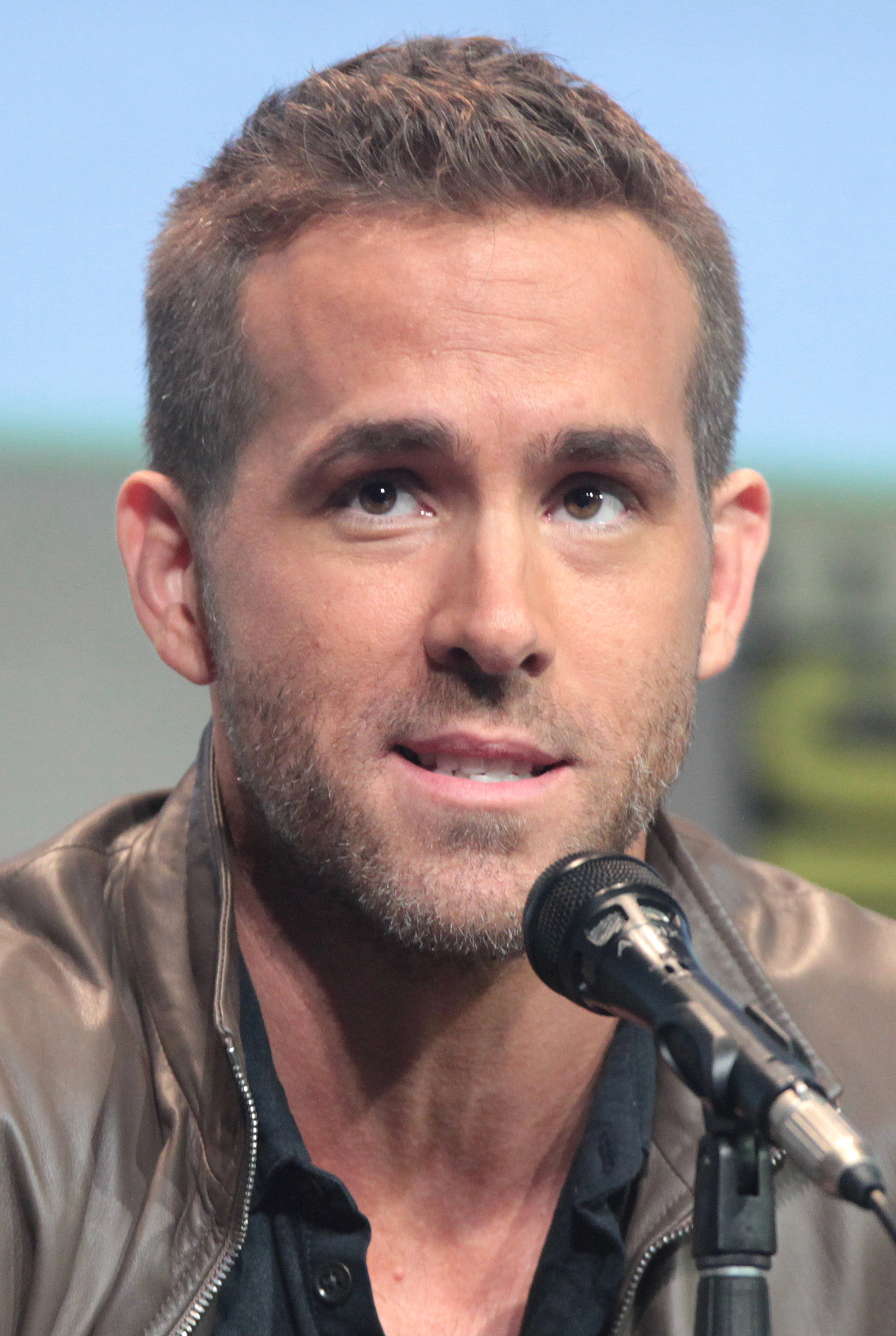
A Match.com commercial produced by Ryan Reynolds (pictured) was the first production to make use of a re-recorded Swift song.

The re-recorded tracks have been featured in various visual media: "Love Story (Taylor's Version)" appeared in an advertisement produced by Canadian actor Ryan Reynolds for the dating app Match.com. "Wildest Dreams (Taylor's Version)" was extensively used in the trailers for the animated adventure film Spirit Untamed (2021) and in an episode of Netflix fantasy series Fate: The Winx Saga (2022). The trailers of Amazon Prime Video romantic drama series The Summer I Turned Pretty made use of parts of "This Love (Taylor's Version)" and "Back to December (Taylor's Version)". "Message in a Bottle" (2021) and "Bad Blood (Taylor's Version)" (2023) are featured in animated superhero film DC League of Super-Pets (2022). A snippet of "Look What You Made Me Do (Taylor's Version)" appeared in the opening credits of the Amazon Prime Video psychological thriller series Wilderness (2023), and later in an episode of the final season of the dystopian series The Handmaid's Tale.

According to Billboard, filmmakers are aware that "Swift songs in scenes or trailers instantly build streaming and ticket-buying audiences" and, in return, use of the songs generates interest in the re-recorded albums. Mike Knobloch, president of music and publishing in American mass media corporation NBCUniversal (which released Spirit Untamed) and who also worked with Swift's team for the Fifty Shades Darker track "I Don't Wanna Live Forever" (2016), stated that "Swift is exposing new music to the widest possible audience. For now, her strategy focuses on family films, but that approach is unlikely to last forever ... She's on a short list of artists that are impactful to the broadest audience. If that translates to family films as a target, then that makes sense. But I don't think she's doing that exclusively."

=== Fan action ===
Journalists and media outlets credited Swift's fans, known commonly as "Swifties", with aiding Swift in magnifying the publicity surrounding the controversy and the success of her re-recording efforts. Braun stated that Swift "weaponized" her fanbase by making the dispute public. He said his family had been excessively bullied by Swift's fans whom she had urged on her social media to "let Scott Borchetta and Scooter Braun know how you feel about this." Citing "numerous death threats" he received, Braun stated, "It's very dangerous. There's people in that fan base who have mental health issues. There's families involved, and I think that's very, very dangerous."

On June 30, 2019, following the news that Braun had acquired Big Machine—and along with it Swift's back catalog—many of Braun's friends congratulated him on their social media accounts; American entrepreneur David Grutman captioned a screenshot of the news headline with "WHEN YOUR FRIEND BUYS TAYLOR SWIFT" in his Instagram story, which Braun re-posted to his account. The story and its re-post were quickly deleted after Swift's fans stated it was reflecting Braun's true intent. On November 22, 2019, Braun posted on Instagram claiming he received death threats from Swift's fans, and wanted to have a conversation with Swift regarding the dispute. He wrote, "I am certain there is no situation ever worth jeopardising anyone's safety." Big Machine headquarters in Nashville was shut down early on November 14, 2019, due to "direct and hostile death threats" made to the company's employees. An online petition launched by a fan on Change.org, calling Braun, Borchetta and the Carlyle Group "to stop holding Swift's art hostage", garnered 35,000 signers in its first three hours. Michael Jones, managing director of campaigns in Change.org, described the petition as "one the fastest-growing petitions on the platform this month".

Fans also mined information about the Carlyle Group and stated that it has ties to the civil war in Yemen. Subsequently, publications such as The New York Times confirmed that Carlyle owns the aerospace manufacturer Wesco Aircraft Holdings, which supplies parts for building Saudi Arabian combat aircraft that are used to drop bombs in Yemen. Following the release of Fearless (Taylor's Version), fans blocked the tracks of Fearless (2008) on their digital music platforms, such as Spotify, to prevent accidentally streaming it—in order to make the older recordings "disappear". On the May 12, 2022, episode of The Tonight Show Starring Jimmy Fallon, in his opening monologue, host Jimmy Fallon summarized several fan speculations about the next re-recorded album from Swift, theorizing that it is either Speak Now (Taylor's Version), 1989 (Taylor's Version), or both at the same time.

=== Peer acknowledgment ===
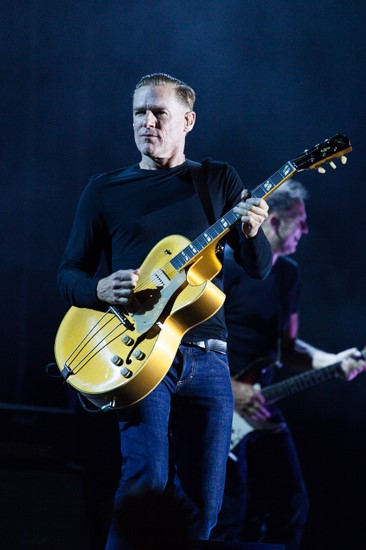
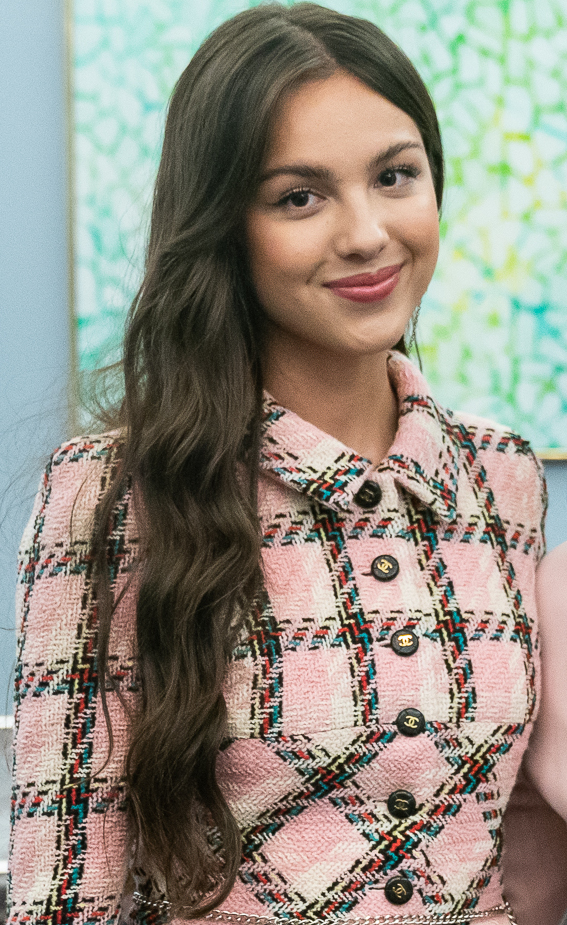
Musicians ranging from senior artists like Bryan Adams (pictured left) to 2021 newcomers like Olivia Rodrigo (right) were influenced by the controversy.

Numerous artists have cited Swift's dispute and re-recording venture as an inspiration. American singer-songwriter Olivia Rodrigo stated that she negotiated with her record label to own her music's masters herself, after observing Swift's battle, and British singer Rita Ora thanked Swift for providing an incentive to purchase her masters herself. American singer Joe Jonas said that he wishes to re-record the Jonas Brothers' back catalog just like Swift. Canadian musician Bryan Adams credited Swift's re-recording projects for inspiring him to begin his own re-recording project, Classic. American vocal group 98 Degrees and American rock band the Departed were also inspired by Swift to re-record. American musician Dave Grohl, frontman of the rock band Foo Fighters, said he was "deeply impressed" by Swift and supports her vision.

American rapper Snoop Dogg cited Swift's re-recordings and stated he wanted to re-record his debut album, Doggystyle (1993), but could not bring himself to do it because he was unable to replicate the "feeling". American singer-songwriter Ashanti announced her intention to re-record her self-titled debut album to gain its masters, and told Metro that she felt "empowered" by Swift; Ashanti further stated "I think Taylor is amazing for what she's done and to be able to be a female in this very male-dominated industry, to accomplish that is amazing. Owning your property and getting a chance to have ownership of your creativity is so so important. Male, female, singer, rapper, whatever, I hope this is a lesson for artists to get in there and own."

Indonesian singer-songwriter Niki stated Swift inspired her to re-record and "reimagine" her original songs that she had deleted from YouTube after signing to her record label, incorporating them into her second studio album, Nicole (2022). American socialite Paris Hilton released an "updated" version of her 2006 song, "Stars Are Blind", re-titled as "Stars Are Blind (Paris' Version)", on December 30, 2022. American singer SZA praised Swift in her 2023 Billboard Woman of the Year interview: "Taylor letting that whole situation go with her masters, then selling all of those fucking records. That's the biggest 'fuck you' to the establishment I've ever seen in my life, and I deeply applaud that shit." American rapper Offset, a former member of hip hop group Migos, described themselves as "rap's Taylor Swift" following a dispute with Quality Control Music, his former record label, over his solo career. He has said he is seeking "control over his master recordings". In 2025, the heavy metal band Five Finger Death Punch said it was inspired by Swift to re-recorded its earlier material after its former label sold their masters without the band's knowledge. Swedish singer Zara Larsson said that Swift's dispute prompted Larsson's record label, TEN Music Group, to offer her the rights to her own masters upon her departure from the label. American singer-songwriter Rachel Platten thanked Swift and announced her own set of re-recordings of a number of songs, including "Fight Song" (2015), subtitled "Rachel's Version", in order to own the masters recordings.

Irish actress Saoirse Ronan and American filmmaker Greta Gerwig said Swift's fight for ownership resonated with them while making the 2019 film adaptation of Little Women, whose author Louisa May Alcott also held onto her copyright. American musician Melissa Etheridge called the re-recording project "probably the most impressive musical business feat I've ever seen. Ever." British musician Imogen Heap called the project "a badass card to stay in control of [Swift's] work in a commercial music industry that largely works against musicians." American singer-songwriter Maren Morris said she found "deep inspiration" in Swift's "courage" "turning the tables on exploitative businessmen and taking back ownership". In 2023, The Guardian suggested that "a revolution is brewing in the music business", witnessing a new generation of female artists, such as Larsson, Dua Lipa, and Rina Sawayama, following Swift's precedence to acquire ownership of their music rights and maintaining a defiant attitude towards forfeiting all rights to the music label.

=== Systemic changes ===
Swift is one of few artists with the power and profile to create change in the music world—when she acts, the industry listens. In reclaiming her masters, and drawing attention to the saga surrounding it, she has made a dramatic statement about the importance of artists owning their work and refusing to let others capitalise on their creativity. Sure, she's a multi-millionaire but in using her platform in this way, she's galvanising other, less established artists to fight for a better deal.

— Katie Rosseinsky, "How Taylor Swift is changing the music industry one re-record at a time", Evening Standard

On November 12, 2021, The Wall Street Journal reported that Universal Music Group, the parent company of Swift's current label, has doubled the amount of time that restricts artists from re-recording their works in their recording deals hereafter. The newspaper said the change represents "shifting power dynamics in the music business", as artists have started to demand better revenue shares and ownership of the masters to their music, incentivized by Swift's situation. Weverse said "the recording industry had been watching [Swift's] rerecording project closely to see where it might go and has recently begun to react" and pointed out that musicians have started to demand the rights to their masters "more and more often" following the controversy. On November 17, 2021, iHeartRadio announced that its radio stations will only play "Taylor's Version" songs henceforth, with plans to replace the rest of the older recordings with the re-recorded tracks as they are officially released.

Following the success of Swift's re-recordings, record labels and companies began to contractually prohibit music artists from ever re-recording their songs or increasing the waiting period to 10–30 years. In October 2023, Billboard reported that the major labels—Universal, Sony Music Entertainment and Warner Music Group—overhauled clauses on re-recording in the contracts for new signees, with several music attorneys opposing this change. Additionally, more artists have moved toward a licensing deal where they retain control of the masters, though traditional contracts where the label owns the masters remain more common. In January 2024, The Guardian reported that the retention periods for music publishing is down from 25 years three decades ago to between 12 and 15 years. According to music industry journalist Eamonn Forde, the publishing part of the music business was "ahead of the curve." On the other hand, label re-recording restrictions are getting longer after Swift's dispute, and that labels do not want re-records, they need to protect their assets. "They don't want their product replaced by something else", stated music industry attorney Erin M. Jacobson. However, in order "to stay competitive, the traditional labels have to consider some alternate structures or terms that are a little more artist-friendly", she said.

=== Academic attention ===
The controversy has also been a topic of study in higher educational institutions. On October 4, 2021, Rafael Landívar University in Guatemala hosted a conference on the topic "International Copyright Protection: Analyzing Taylor Swift's Case". The University of Virginia Darden School of Business released a new case study on the masters controversy in September 2023. Cecilia Giles from University of Cincinnati Law School released a research paper in March 2024 about the impact of Swift's re-recordings on record labels and to the whole music industry landscape.

In January 2022, a spring semester course focusing on Swift's career and its cultural impact was launched at New York University's Tisch School of the Arts, with "copyright and ownership" as one of the topics covered by the syllabus. Queen's University at Kingston offers a fall semester course, titled "Taylor Swift's Literary Legacy (Taylor's Version)", focusing on her sociopolitical impact on contemporary culture; its syllabus includes studying select songs from Swift's studio albums, with the use of re-recorded versions wherever possible. In November 2023, the University of South Dakota announced a law course centered around Swift's interactions with the law, which will examine her re-recordings and related copyright issues.

=== Inspiration ===
Songs from each of Swift's 2020 albums, "My Tears Ricochet" and "Mad Woman" from Folklore, and "It's Time to Go" from Evermore, were underscored by critics for their references to the dispute, Borchetta, and Braun. "My Tears Ricochet" is about how Swift felt betrayed by Borchetta and uses a funeral metaphor, while "Mad Woman" is about the "gaslighting" Swift experienced at the hands of Braun. Widespread interpretation had that the tracks "Vigilante Shit" and "Karma" from Midnights (2022) also diss Braun, while the track "Father Figure" from The Life of a Showgirl (2025), diss Borchetta.

Vulture critic Jason P. Frank opined that American singer Demi Lovato's decision to release her 2023 remix album, Revamped, was inspired by Swift's re-recordings. A docuseries commissioned by Warner Bros. Discovery, titled Taylor Swift vs Scooter Braun: Bad Blood, was released in June 2024.
