= William J. Martínez =

Mexican-American judge (born 1954)

Senior Judge of the United States District Court for the District of Colorado
- Incumbent
- Assumed office February 10, 2023

Judge of the United States District Court for the District of Colorado
- In office December 21, 2010 – February 10, 2023
- Appointed by: Barack Obama
- Preceded by: Edward Nottingham
- Succeeded by: Gordon Gallagher

Personal details
- Born: José Guillermo Martínez Escalante; 1954 (age 71–72) Mexico City, Mexico
- Education: University of Illinois at Urbana–Champaign (BA, BS); University of Chicago (JD)

William Joseph Martínez (born José Guillermo Martínez Escalante, 1954) is a Mexican-American attorney serving as a senior United States district judge of the United States District Court for the District of Colorado.

== Early life and education ==
Born José Guillermo Martínez Escalante in Mexico City, Martínez moved to the United States with his family as a child and changed his name to William Joseph Martínez in 1974. He grew up in the South Shore community of Chicago and graduated from Lyons Township High School in La Grange, Illinois. Martínez earned a Bachelor of Arts and Bachelor of Science degree from the University of Illinois at Urbana-Champaign in 1977, followed by a J.D. degree from the University of Chicago Law School in 1980.

== Career ==
From 1980 until 1984, Martínez served as a staff attorney for the Legal Assistance Foundation of Metropolitan Chicago, and from 1984 until 1987, he served as a staff attorney for the foundation's Employment Law Project. From 1988 until 1992, Martínez served as a senior litigation associate for a Denver law firm. From 1992 until 1996, he served as a Denver-based regional attorney for the United States Equal Employment Opportunity Commission. From 1997 until 2001, Martínez worked as a sole law practitioner in Denver, and from 2001 until 2010 he was a partner at the Denver firm of McNamara & Martínez (later known as McNamara, Roseman, Martínez & Kazmierski), where he specialized in employment and civil rights law.

=== Federal judicial service ===
On February 24, 2010, President Barack Obama nominated Martínez to serve as a United States district judge of the United States District Court for the District of Colorado, to fill the seat that Judge Edward Nottingham vacated in 2008 when he resigned. Martínez was confirmed by the United States Senate on December 21, 2010 by a 58–37 vote. He received his commission the same day. He assumed senior status on February 10, 2023.

== See also ==
- List of Hispanic and Latino American jurists

Legal offices
Preceded by Edward Nottingham	Judge of the United States District Court for the District of Colorado; 2010–2023	Succeeded by Gordon Gallagher
