= Synchronization rights =

Term that allows the use of musical recording in visual media

A music synchronization license, or "sync" for short, is a music license granted by the holder of the copyright of a particular composition, allowing the licensee to synchronize ("sync") their music with various forms of media output (film, television shows, advertisements, video games, accompanying website music, movie trailers, etc.).

== Copyright ownership ==
The rights to a composition or the "song", which is different from the studio sound recording, are most often administered by the publishing company that represents the writer/producer. A sound recording has two separated copyrights:

1. the sound recording itself, also called the "master" sound recording; this is most often owned or administered by the record label;
2. the composition of the musical work, which consists of the underlying lyrics and melody written by the songwriter; this is most often owned or administered by the music publisher.

== Sync negotiations and fees ==
When an audio/visual project producer wants to use a recording in their work, they must contact both the owner of the sound recording (record label of the performer), and the owner of the composition (publishing company of the songwriter). In many cases, producers with tight budgets will elect to use a cover version of a particular song or work with independent artists in order to save money on the master side. In doing so, they can ask the artist to write original music or submit music that would be considered "work-for-hire" where they would buy artist out of their master side.

Once the producer has made an inquiry with the copyright administrator (and additionally the record label if they choose to use a famous recording), the rights holder or administrator issues a quote, usually for a "one-time fee" (often called the "sync fee" or the "front end"). Negotiations for the licensing fee typically address how the work is being used, the length of the segment, the prominence of the cue (whether used as background music, the title track during the credits, or other uses), and the overall popularity and importance of the song or recording. Another point of negotiation is whether the sync license constitutes a "buyout" (i.e. whether or not the entity that will ultimately broadcast the production will be required to pay "backend" (performance royalty) fees).

Sync licensing fees can range anywhere from free, to a few hundred dollars, to millions of dollars for popular recordings of songs (when the producer must pay for both the use of the sound recording "master" as well as the composition). Sync rights have been considered a lucrative and major field of the music industry; music industry attorney Erin M. Jacobson stated that they had "really helped to keep things afloat and keep revenues flowing into the industry, especially in a business climate of some uncertain times."

Some musicians have been known for being more selective over the works they license their music for. In some cases, they may also help to draw new or renewed interest in a song (especially with the current prominence of music streaming services). Kate Bush licensed her song "Running Up That Hill" for the fourth season of the Netflix series Stranger Things, as she was a fan of the series; after its release, the song experienced a major resurgence in popularity afterward, and became her first number-one single in the UK since 1978.
