= Scooter Braun =

American businessman (born 1981)

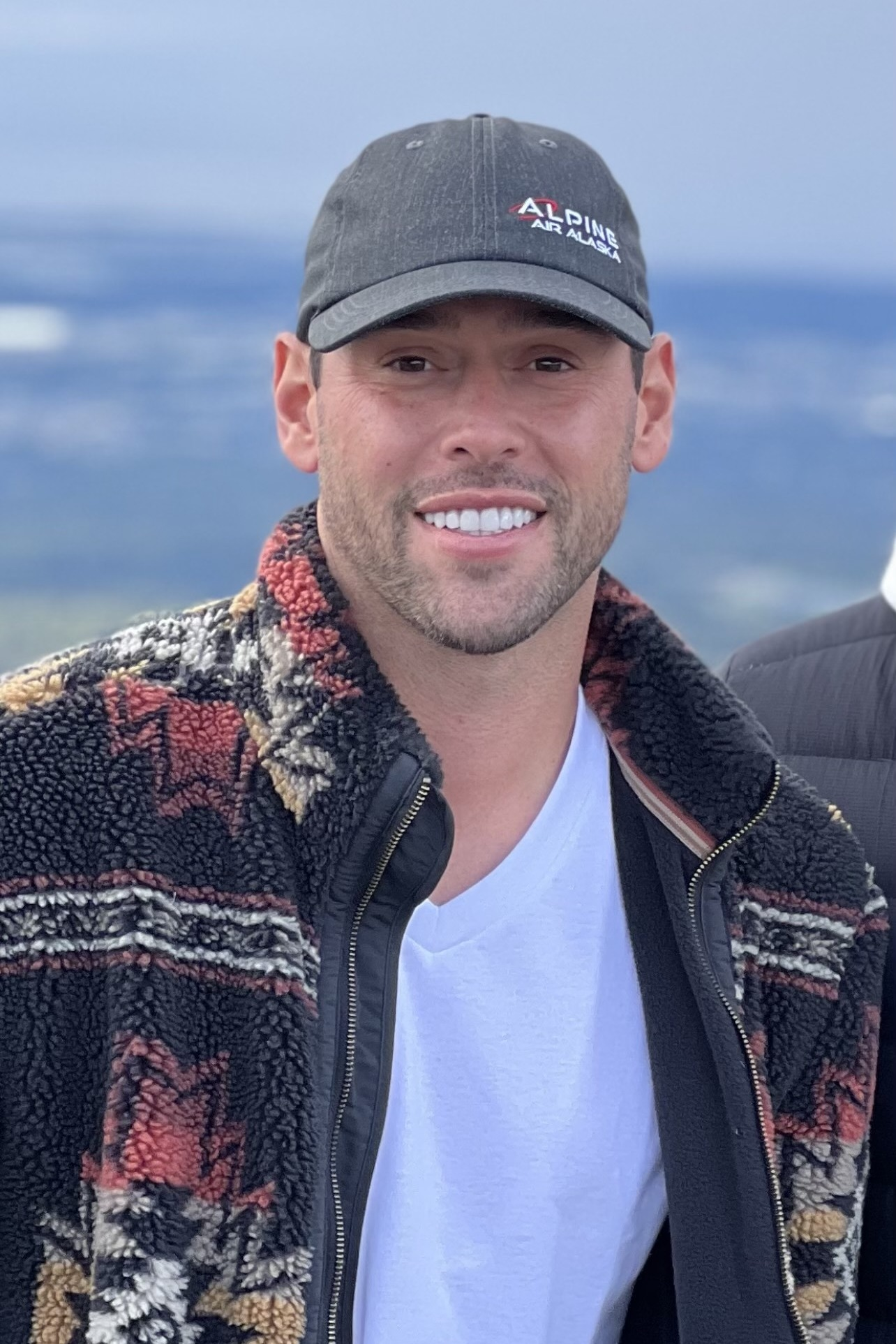
- Braun in 2022
- Born: Scott Samuel Braun; June 18, 1981 (age 45); New York City, U.S.
- Occupations: Record executive; businessman; investor
- Years active: 2003–present
- Organization(s): Hybe, SB Projects, TQ Ventures
- Labels: Big Machine; RBMG; SB Projects; School Boy
- Title: Founder of School Boy Records and co-founder of Raymond-Braun Media Group (RBMG)
- Board member of: Hybe America
- Spouse: Yael Cohen (m. 2014; div. 2022)
- Children: 3
- Website: scooterbraun.com

Signature
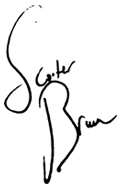

Scott Samuel "Scooter" Braun (born June 18, 1981) is an American businessman, investor, former talent manager, and record executive. He is credited with having discovered and managed Canadian singer Justin Bieber in 2008 and signed American singer Ariana Grande to his management agency in 2012, whose success led to the establishment of Braun's RBMG Records and later, SB Projects, which were both acquired by Hybe Corporation. Braun has also worked in career management for artists including Kanye West, Demi Lovato, J Balvin, Ozuna, Dan + Shay, and the Kid Laroi, among others. He retired from artist management in 2024.

A Grammy Award nominee, Braun is also the founder of Schoolboy Records, co-founder of investment firm TQ Ventures and Mythos Studios, and founder of Ithaca Holdings, whose 2019 acquisition of Big Machine Records led to a dispute with Taylor Swift until 2025. He was also the executive producer for the FX channel comedy series Dave (2020–2023).

== Early life ==
Braun was born in New York City to Conservative Jewish parents, Ervin and Susan (née Schlussel) Braun. Ervin's parents emigrated to the US from Hungary in 1956. Ervin was raised in Queens, New York City and became a dentist and high school basketball coach. Susan Braun was an orthodontist. After the couple married, they settled in Cos Cob, Connecticut.

Scooter Braun has four siblings. He attended Greenwich High School, where he was on the school basketball team and was elected class president. Braun attended Emory University in Atlanta where he played basketball and began using the first name Scooter but he left school to pursue his music career.

== Career ==
Braun began organizing parties while studying at Emory. In 2002, Braun was hired to plan after-parties in each of the five cities on the Anger Management Tour, which featured Ludacris and Eminem. He subsequently met Jermaine Dupri, the founder of So So Def Records, who offered him a job as So So Def's executive director of marketing. Events organized by Braun in this era included parties for the 2003 NBA All-Star Game and after-parties for Britney Spears' 2004 Onyx Hotel Tour. Braun left So So Def in 2005, and a few weeks later brokered a $12 million campaign deal between Ludacris and Pontiac. After the Pontiac deal, Braun was hired as an entertainment consultant for the Atlanta Hawks.

In 2008, Braun scouted Bieber, then 13, after accidentally clicking on a YouTube video of Bieber singing. Braun urged Bieber's mother, Pattie Mallette, to bring her son to Atlanta to record demos and meet R&B singer Usher. He eventually convinced them to move permanently from Canada to the US. Both Usher and Justin Timberlake expressed interest in signing Bieber, who ultimately signed with Island Def Jam in partnership with Raymond-Braun Media Group (RBMG), a joint venture between Braun and Usher. Braun signed Ariana Grande to his management label in 2013.

Braun also managed Psy, Tori Kelly, Carly Rae Jepsen, Martin Garrix, Kanye West, Black Eyed Peas, David Guetta, Lil Dicky, and others. He acquired half of the management companies of Jason Owens’ Sandbox Entertainment, Morris Higham, Brandon Creed, Troy Carter, and a partnership with Future and Drake. In 2024, he retired from artist management to focus on the HYBE-America CEO role. Starting in 2021, Braun was chief executive officer (CEO) of Hybe America, the North American subsidiary of South Korean entertainment company Hybe Corporation until he moved to a board member and senior advisor role in 2025.

=== Film and television ===
Braun produced Never Say Never, a documentary about Bieber that MTV reported in 2011 as "one of the highest grossing music documentaries in domestic box-office history". The film's budget was $13 million and earned over $100 million worldwide. Braun was the executive producer of Burden, Demi Lovato: Dancing with the Devil, The Giver, The Boy from Medellin, and Project Runway among others. Braun was also an executive producer for the CBS drama Scorpion, which aired from 2014 until 2018. In 2018, Variety reported that FX had ordered a pilot of Dave, a comedy executive-produced by Braun that included actor Kevin Hart and rapper Lil Dicky. In its first season, Dave was the most-watched show in FX history. In July 2019, SB Projects signed a first-look deal with Amazon Studios that included television and film scripts. Braun's SB Projects has also had film and television projects at Netflix, Hulu, and Fox.

=== SB Projects ===
In 2007, Braun established SB Projects, an entertainment and marketing company that encompassed ventures including Schoolboy Records, SB Management, and Sheba Publishing, a music publishing firm. The group also included RBMG, a joint venture between Braun and Usher. School Boy Records was founded as a joint venture with Universal Music Publishing Group. In early 2013, Braun signed Ariana Grande.

SB Projects has handled television campaigns, branding, music-licensing deals, and tour sponsorships, including Bieber's Calvin Klein endorsement for the 2016-2017 Purpose World Tour. The company also brokered a partnership between Kanye West and sneaker brand Adidas.

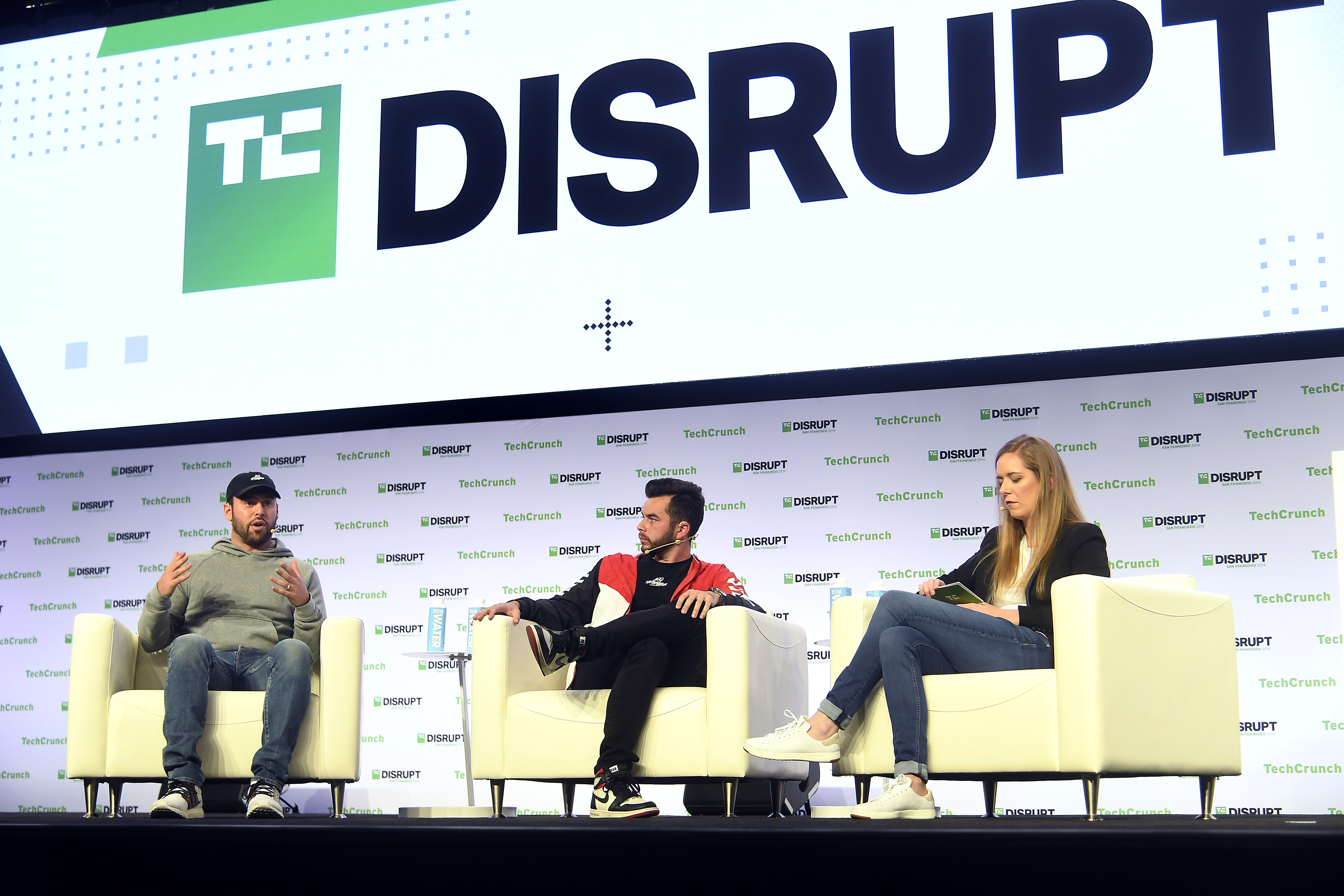
Braun (left) onstage at TechCrunch Disrupt SF 2019 with Matthew "Nadeshot" Haag and TechCrunch Editor Jordon Crook

=== Ithaca Holdings, Hybe ===
Ithaca Holdings, Braun's holding company that includes SB Projects, raised $120 million in venture capital in 2010.

In 2019, Ithaca acquired Big Machine Label Group in a purchase that included the masters of the first six albums of singer-songwriter Taylor Swift. The label's founder and president, Scott Borchetta, retained his position as CEO and gained a minority interest in Ithaca Holdings as well as a board seat. Taylor Swift has publicly denounced the transfer of ownership of her Big Machine album masters to Braun. She has also lambasted Borchetta for his role in the sale.

In 2020, Ithaca Holdings sold the Taylor Swift master recordings to Shamrock Holdings for a reported $405 million, earning Ithaca $265 million. In response, Taylor Swift announced her plans to re-record her old albums to diminish the value of the original recordings.

In April 2021, South Korean company Hybe announced that it would acquire Ithaca Holdings via the subsidiary Hybe America in a deal estimated at around $1.05 billion. As part of the sale, Braun became Hybe America's CEO and joined Hybe's board of directors. Longtime staffers were given $50 million in stock from Braun's personal allotment, with Bieber and Grande receiving $10 million each. On May 31, 2022, Braun met with BTS and US President Joe Biden at the White House to discuss the recent rise in anti-Asian hate crimes. Braun and Clive Davis presented Hybe chairman Bang Si-Hyuk with the Visionary award at Billboard's Power 100 Party in 2023.

In 2023, Hybe acquired Quality Control Music for $300 million, with Kevin "Coach K" Lee and Pierre "P" Thomas maintaining control of the label under Braun. In 2025, Braun partnered Hybe America with Jermaine Dupri's So So Def to launch new music and cooperate on distribution and marketing. Later that year Braun stepped down as the CEO of Hybe America, continuing as board director and senior advisor.

=== Mythos Studios ===
In 2018, The New York Times reported that Braun had joined David Maisel, founding chairman of Marvel Studios, to form Mythos Studios to produce comic book movie franchises in live-action and animated formats.

=== Investments ===
Braun is a partner in the investment firm TQ Ventures. He was an early investor in Uber, Spotify, Waze, DropBox, Pinterest, Lyft, Ro, Noom, Liquid I.V., among others. The acquisition of his holdings company, Ithaca, brought Braun's net worth beyond $1 billion in 2021.

== Awards ==
In 2012, Braun was awarded an ACLU Bill of Rights award. In 2013, Braun was included in the annual Time 100 list of the most influential people in the world. He also appeared a second time on the cover of Billboard in its April 20, 2013, issue, alongside Guy Oseary and Troy Carter.

Braun was nominated for Grammy awards for his work as a producer and songwriter on Bieber's albums Purpose in 2017 and Justice in 2022. In 2017, he appeared on the cover of Variety magazine's Hitmakers. With Grande, Simon Moran, and Melvin Benn, he organized One Love Manchester, a June 14 benefit concert and British television special in response to the Manchester Arena bombing after Grande's concert two weeks earlier.

In 2018, Braun received the Harry Chapin Memorial Humanitarian Award for his philanthropic efforts in 2017. He also received the Save the Children's Humanitarian Award that year.

ln 2019 he was inducted into the Midem Hall of Fame. In 2020, Fortune named him to its "40 Under 40" list in media and entertainment. In 2021, Braun was named Variety magazine's "Music Mogul of the Year." In 2024, Braun was honored by the Anti-Defamation League for his role in the Nova Festival Exhibit in New York City.

== Politics ==
Braun hosted a fundraiser for Hillary Clinton at his home in 2015. In 2019, he hosted a fundraiser for the Kamala Harris 2020 presidential campaign. He supported developer Rick Caruso in the 2022 Los Angeles mayoral election.

During the Gaza war, Braun expressed support for both the release of Israeli hostages and relief for Palestinians. In December 2023, he spoke at a rally in Tel Aviv's Hostages Square and featured the mother of an Israeli hostage in a video posted to his Instagram calling for the music industry to spread awareness on the issue.

== Philanthropy ==
Braun is involved in various charities, including the Braun Family Foundation. He also assists with his brother Adam's charity, Pencils of Promise. Billboard reported that as of 2017, Braun—along with his then-clients and companies—had granted more wishes for the Make-A-Wish Foundation than any other organization in the history of the foundation. He received the Humanitarian Award at the 2016 Billboard Touring Awards for his philanthropic support of Pencils of Promise, the Make-A-Wish Foundation, and Fuck Cancer. Braun and actor George Clooney held significant roles in March for Our Lives and aided in fundraising efforts behind the scenes. In 2017, Braun was an organizer of Hand in Hand, a telethon which raised $55 million for relief efforts related to Hurricane Harvey and Hurricane Irma.

Braun coordinated the charity single "Stuck with U" by Justin Bieber and Ariana Grande, which benefited the First Responders Children's Foundation to fund grants and scholarships for children of first responders and healthcare workers who worked on the front lines during the pandemic. In 2023, Braun joined the board of directors of the Make-A-Wish Foundation.

In March 2024, Braun launched a fundraising project with Care.org and the Hostages and Missing Families Forum in Israel.

== Personal life ==
In 2013, Braun began dating Yael Cohen. The couple wed on July 6, 2014, in Whistler, British Columbia, Canada, at Cohen's parents' house. They had a son in 2015, another son in 2016, and a daughter in 2018. Braun filed for divorce in July 2021, which was finalized in September 2022. By June 2025 Braun was in a relationship with actress Sydney Sweeney.

Braun is a lifelong fan of the New York Knicks, New York Jets, and New York Mets.

In 2026, Braun laid tefillin with Chabad activist Yossi Farro during the week of the Milken Institute Global Conference in Los Angeles.

== Filmography ==
Year(s)	Title	Notes	Credited as	Ref.
2011	Never Say Never	Documentary	Producer	
2014–2018	Scorpion	TV series	Executive producer	
2015	Jem and the Holograms	Film	Musical producer	
2016	Radio Disney Music Awards	TV show	Creative executive producer	
2020	Karma	TV series	Co-creator	
2020–2022	Dave	TV series	Executive producer	

== See also ==
- Taylor Swift vs Scooter Braun: Bad Blood – 2024 two-part documentary special
