= Erin M. Jacobson =

American music industry attorney

- Education: University of Southern California (BA); Southwestern Law School (JD)
- Occupation: Attorney
- Website: themusicindustrylawyer.com

Erin M. Jacobson is an American attorney and writer. She specializes in intellectual property law in the music industry.

== Early life and education ==
Jacobson attended the University of Southern California School of Music. She earned her Juris Doctor degree at Southwestern Law School, where she served as the president of Southwestern's Entertainment and Sports Law Society, the national student liaison to the ABA Forum Committee on Entertainment and Sports Industries Law, and the student liaison to Southwestern for the Beverly Hills Bar Association. After passing the California Bar Exam, she opened her own law practice in Beverly Hills, California, acting as CEO.

== Career ==
Jacobson worked in the publicity department of Capitol Records. She also worked for Rick Dees, helping him produce Rick Dees Weekly Top 40 Countdown, the longest continuously running countdown (featuring pop music) in the world. She worked at Bug Music and other music publishing companies, as well as several music law firms.

She has handled music legal matters involving Elvis Presley, The Ronettes, Sam Cooke, Andy Williams, Frank Sinatra, Prince, and others.

In 2020, Jacobson published a book, Don't Get Screwed! How to Protect Yourself as an Independent Musician. She discusses copyright, royalties, and contracts. She founded Indie Artist Resource (IAR), website providing contract templates and educational resources for independent musicians, stating her goal was to educate independent artists through the legal barriers that exist.

Billboard recognized her work on theme songs, holiday classics, amongst other music, as Jacobson voiced her concern for AI an its legal implications in her field.

She was featured in Music Business Worldwide's Inspiring Women interview series. In an article on the Women's International Music Network, Jacobson expressed her belief that some refuse to take advice from women and the need for women to work together in a predominantly male field.

Jacobson was named to Billboard magazine's Top Music Lawyers list for seven consecutive years, from 2020 to 2026.
