= Booth baronets of Allerton Beeches (1916) =

Booth baronets coat of arms

Escutcheon granted to Sir Alfred Booth, Bt

The Booth baronetcy, of Allerton Beeches in the City of Liverpool, was created in the baronetage of the United Kingdom on 24 January 1916 for Sir Alfred Allen Booth, a director of Alfred Booth and Company and chairman of the Cunard Steamship Company. The 1st baronet received a new grant of arms upon being created a baronet during the First World War, later establishing his family's descent from the Booths of Twemlow, Cheshire, cadets of the Booths of Dunham Massey.

As of 2026 the title is held by his grandson, Sir Douglas Booth, who succeeded his father in 1960 as 3rd baronet. A television and film writer, Doug Booth lives in the United States with his wife and two daughters.

== Booth baronets, of Allerton Beeches (1916) ==
- Sir Alfred Allen Booth, 1st Baronet (1872–1948)
- Sir Philip Booth, 2nd Baronet (1907–1960)
- Sir Douglas Allen Booth, 3rd Baronet (born 1949)

The heir presumptive is the present baronet's younger brother Dr Derek Blake Booth (born 1953).

== See also ==
- Booth baronets
