= Douglas Allen Booth =

British-American producer and writer (born 1949)

Sir Douglas Booth Bt
- Born: 2 December 1949 (age 76); Los Angeles, California, U.S.
- Education: Harvard University
- Occupations: TV producer and writer
- Spouse: Marcela Scantlebury (m. 1991)
- Children: 2
- Relatives: Derek Booth (brother)
- Honours: Baronet

Booth coat of arms

Sir Douglas Allen Booth, 3rd Baronet (born 2 December 1949), is an Anglo-American screen writer and television producer.

== Early life ==
He is the elder son of Sir Philip Booth (1907–1960), and Ethel (née Greenfield; 1914–2018), a pioneering broadcaster.

Booth was educated at Beverly Hills High School, California, before going up to read American History and Literature at Harvard, graduating Bachelor of Arts magna cum laude.

Upon his father's death in 1960, Sir Douglas succeeded to the baronetcy.

== Career ==
=== As a television producer ===
In 1985, Booth worked as an associate producer for fifty-five episodes of the television series G. I. Joe: A Real American Hero and Robotix. In 1986, he was co-producer for Potato Head Kids and The Glo Friends. From 1992 to 1994, he was producer for 65 episodes of Conan the Adventurer.

=== As a television writer ===
In 1978, Booth was a television writer for Yogi's Space Race and Dinky Dog, and from 1978 to 1981, he wrote for The All-New Popeye Hour. In 1979, he wrote for The New Fred and Barney Show, Godzilla, Buford and the Galloping Ghost, and The New Shmoo. In 1980, he wrote for The Flintstone Comedy Show and Drak Pack. The following year, in 1981, he wrote for Spider-Man and His Amazing Friends and Super Friends. In 1981–1982, he wrote for Spider-Man, and in 1982, for The Little Rascals and The Smurfs. In 1983, he wrote for the American TV series Monchhichi. In 1983–1984, he wrote for He-Man and the Masters of the Universe. In 1984, he wrote for The New Scooby Mysteries, Super Friends: The Legendary Super Powers Show, Mighty Orbots and Heathcliff and the Catillac Cats. In 1984–1985, he wrote for The Transformers, and in 1985, for Challenge of the GoBots. In 1986, he wrote for G. I. Joe: A Real American Hero, Potato Head Kids and The Glo Friends. In 1987, he wrote for Garbage Pail Kids and Visionaries: Knights of the Magical Light, in 1988 for Teenage Mutant Ninja Turtles and in 1989 for G.I. Joe: Operation Dragonfire.

In 1990, he wrote for Captain N: The Game Master and The Adventures of Super Mario Bros. 3 as well as Barnyard Commandos. In 1991, he wrote for Peter Pan and the Pirates, G.I. Joe: A Real American Hero and ProStars, in 1992 for My Little Pony Tales, and in 1993 for Mighty Max and Adventures of Sonic the Hedgehog. In 1995, he wrote for X-Men, Skeleton Warriors, Street Fighter and Hurricanes. From 1994 to 1996, he wrote for Iron Man. In 1995–1996, he wrote for Spider-Man, and in 1996, for The Magic School Bus.

Since 1999, Booth has been a writer for the Spanish TV series Yolanda: Daughter of the Black Corsair, and in 2002 for Gladiator Academy and Fix & Foxi and Friends, both also on Spanish television. He wrote for Shadow of the Elves for German television in 2004, for Adventurers: Masters of Time in 2005 and School for Vampires in 2006, all on German television.

== Personal life ==
Married to Yolanda Marcela Scantlebury on 17 November 1991, Sir Douglas and Lady Booth have two daughters.

The heir presumptive to the family baronetcy is his younger brother, the geologist Derek Booth.

== Filmography ==
Series head writer denoted in bold:

- Dinky Dog (1978)
- Buford and the Galloping Ghost (1978)
- The All-New Popeye Hour (1978)
- Yogi's Space Race (1978)
- The New Fred and Barney Show (1979)
- The New Shmoo (1979)
- Godzilla (1979)
- Drak Pack (1980)
- The Flintstone Comedy Show (1980)
- Spider-Man and His Amazing Friends (1981)
- Spider-Man (1981-1982)
- The Little Rascals (1982)
- The Smurfs (1982)
- Monchichis (1983)
- He-Man and the Masters of the Universe (1983-1984)
- **The New Scooby-Doo Mysteries** (1984)
- Super Friends (1984)
- Mighty Orbots (1984)
- The Transformers (1984-1985)
- Heathcliff (1984, 1986)
- Challenge of the GoBots (1985)
- The Glo Friends (1986)
- G.I. Joe: A Real American Hero (1986)
- Potato Head Kids (1986)
- Visionaries: Knights of the Magical Light (1987)
- Garbage Pail Kids (1988)
- Teenage Mutant Ninja Turtles (1988)
- **G.I. Joe: A Real American Hero** (1989-1991): season 1-2 head writer
- Barnyard Commandos (1990)
- The Adventures of Super Mario Bros. 3 (1990)
- Fox's Peter Pan & the Pirates (1991)
- ProStars (1991)
- My Little Pony Tales (1992)
- Conan the Adventurer (1992-1993)
- Tarzán (1993)
- Hurricanes (1993)
- Adventures of Sonic the Hedgehog (1993)
- Transformers: Generation 2 (1993)
- Mighty Max (1994)
- **Street Sharks** (1994): season 2 head writer
- Iron Man (1994-1996)
- Ultraforce (1995)
- Tenko and the Guardians of the Magic (1995)
- Darkstalkers (1995)
- Creepy Crawlers (1995)
- X-Men: The Animated Series (1995)
- Captain Planet and the Planeteers (1995)
- Skeleton Warriors (1995)
- Street Fighter (1995)
- Spider-Man: The Animated Series (1995-1996)
- Dragon Flyz (1996)
- The Magic School Bus (1996)
- 101 Dalmatians: The Series (1997)
- Extreme Dinosaurs (1997)
- Where on Earth Is Carmen Sandiego? (1998)
- Pocket Dragon Adventures (1998)
- Roswell Conspiracies: Aliens, Myths and Legends (1999)
- Sonic Underground (1999)
- Yolanda, the Black Corsair's Daughter (1999)
- Gladiator Academy (2002)
- Fix & Foxi and Friends (2002)
- Shadow of the Elves (2004)
- Adventurers: Masters of Time (2005)
- Winx Club (2005)
- Growing Up Creepie (2006)
- School for Vampires (2006)

== See also ==
- Booth baronets
- Alfred Booth & Co.

Baronetage of the United Kingdom
Preceded by Sir Philip Booth	Baronet (of Allerton Beeches); 1960–present	Incumbent
