= HMS Hilary (1940) =

Amphibious warfare ship of the Royal Navy

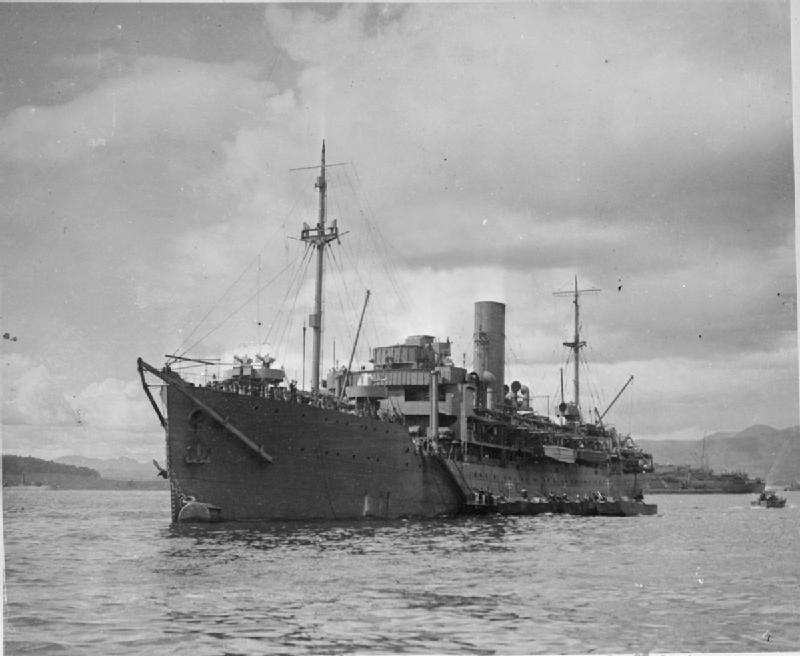
- HMS Hilary at Greenock in the 1940s

History

United Kingdom
- Name: Hilary
- Namesake: Hilary of Poitiers
- Owner: Booth Steamship Co
- Operator: Booth Steamship Co; 1931–40, 42–43, 45–56; (United Kingdom) Royal Navy 1940–42, 43–45; Elder, Dempster Line
- Port of registry: (United Kingdom) Liverpool
- Route: Liverpool – Manaus 1931–40, 1946–56, 1957–59; Liverpool – Lagos 1956
- Builder: Cammell, Laird & Co
- Cost: £219,000
- Yard number: 975
- Launched: 17 April 1931
- Completed: August 1931
- Refit: 1940, 1942, 1946, 1956
- Identification: UK official number 162350; code letters LHFD (until 1933); call sign GQVM (1934 onward); Pennant number F22 (1941–42)
- Fate: Scrapped 1959

General characteristics
- Type: Ocean liner
- Tonnage: 7,403 GRT, 4,350 NRT
- Length: 424.2 ft (129.3 m)
- Beam: 56.2 ft (17.1 m)
- Draught: 24 ft 7 3/4 in (7.51 m)
- Depth: 34.2 ft (10.4 m)
- Decks: 3
- Installed power: 1,033 NHP
- Propulsion: triple-expansion steam engine; low-pressure steam turbine; single screw
- Speed: 14 knots (26 km/h)
- Capacity: passengers: 1931: 80 first class, 250 third class; 1943: 378 troops; 1946: 93 first class, 138 third class; 1956: 86 first class, 122 tourist class
- Crew: 313 (as landing ship, infantry)
- Sensors & processing systems: as built: wireless direction finding; by 1935: echo sounding device
- Armament: 2 × 6-inch guns; 1 × 12-pounder gun; 4 × anti-aircraft machine guns

SS Hilary was a British steam passenger liner that was built in 1931 and scrapped in 1959. She spent much of her career on a scheduled service between Liverpool in England and Manaus in Brazil.

In the Second World War the ship spent two periods in the Royal Navy as HMS Hilary. The first was in 1941–42 as an ocean boarding vessel. The second was in 1943–45 as a landing ship, infantry and headquarters ship.

Hilary belonged to the Booth Steamship Company throughout her career. She was the largest ship Booth ever owned, both in length and in tonnage. She also had the most powerful engines of any Booth ship.

This was the third Booth ship to be called Hilary. The first was a cargo ship that was built in 1889 as Red Sea, bought by Booth and renamed Hilary in 1892, sold in 1911 to Japanese buyers and renamed Misumi Maru. The second was a passenger and cargo ship that was built in 1908, requisitioned in 1914 as the armed merchant cruiser HMS Hilary, and sunk in 1917 by a u-boat.

== Building ==
Cammell, Laird and Company built Hilary for £219,000. She was launched on 17 April 1931 and completed that August.

Hilary was 424.2 ft (129.3 m) long and her tonnages were 7,403 GRT and 4,350 NRT, which made her the largest ship in Booth's fleet. As built, she had berths for 80 first class and 250 third class passengers.

Hilary had five single-ended boilers, each heated by three furnaces. The boilers raised steam at 230 lb_{f}/in^{2} for her main engine, which was a three-cylinder triple-expansion steam engine that drove her single screw.

Hilary also had a Bauer-Wach turbine to increase her power and fuel efficiency. Exhaust steam from the low-pressure cylinder of her main engine powered a low-pressure turbine. Via double-reduction gearing and a Föttinger fluid coupling the turbine drove the same propeller shaft as her main engine.

The combined power of her main engine plus the turbine was rated at 1,033 NHP, and gave her a speed of 14 knots (26 km/h).

Hilary's UK official number was 162350. Until 1933 her code letters were LHFD. From 1934 they were superseded by the call sign GQVM.

From the start of her career Hilary was equipped with wireless direction finding. By 1935 she had been fitted with an echo sounding device.

== Pre-War Service ==
Hilary served as a liner running between Liverpool and Brazil. Adverts for her pleasure cruises in 1934 claimed she carried passengers 1000 miles up the Amazon. In 1936 during one of these Amazon cruises she came fast on a mudbank, but Capt. R.H. Buck managed to get her off without assistance. A grounding of a more serious nature occurred on 9 April 1939, when in dense fog the vessel ran aground on rocks at Carmel Head, Anglesey. Captain L. Evans had anchored off the Skerries because of the dense fog, and then it was decided to make for Holyhead to pick up a pilot and she grounded shortly afterwards. She was listing 30 degrees, and the lifeboat and a trawler took off 90 passengers. However, after plugging some holes where rivets had been lost, she managed to get herself off the rocks using her own engines on the next tide, control the leak in No 1 hold, and proceed to Liverpool.

== Second World War service ==
For the first year of the Second World War Hilary continued in civilian service, using convoys to make at least three trips from Liverpool to Lisbon. In September 1940 she was a member of Convoy HX 70 from Halifax, Nova Scotia to Liverpool.

=== Ocean boarding vessel ===
On 16 October 1940 the British Admiralty requisitioned Hilary and sent her to South Shields for conversion into an ocean boarding vessel. She was armed with two 6-inch guns, one 12-pounder gun and four anti-aircraft machine guns. On 21 January 1941 she was commissioned as HMS Hilary, with the pennant number F 22.

In April 1941 Hilary was one of the escorts of Convoy OB 313.

On 3 May 1941 Hilary intercepted the Italian 5,595 GRT tanker Recco 350 nautical miles (650 km) south of the Azores. The Italian crew scuttled Recco to prevent Hilary from capturing her.

On 10 May Hilary captured the Italian 5,719 GRT tanker Gianna M off Las Palmas and put a prize crew aboard her. Hilary and her prize joined Convoy HG 61, which had left Gibraltar and was bound for Liverpool. The prize crew took Gianna M to Belfast, where she was taken over by the Ministry of War Transport and renamed Empire Control.

Hilary continued as a convoy escort between Liverpool, Gibraltar and Freetown from May until October 1941. She again escorted convoys between Liverpool and Freetown in February 1942. In March 1942 she escorted Convoy WN 261 from Oban in the west of Scotland around the north coast to Methil on the Firth of Forth.

=== Civilian service ===
In 1942 the Admiralty returned Hilary to civilian service with Booth Line. Sources disagree as to whether she was decommissioned on 15 April or 26 July. She had resumed merchant service by August 1942, and then sailed in transatlantic convoys. In two convoys in October and November 1942 Hilary was the commodore ship.

On one occasion in 1942 two U-boats pursued Hilary. One hit Hilary with a torpedo amidships, but it failed to detonate.

In November 1942 Hilary took part in Convoy UGF 2 from Hampton Roads to Casablanca in support of the Allied invasion of French North Africa. In December she sailed from Liverpool to Freetown, and in January and February 1943 she sailed from New York City via Guantanamo and Trinidad to Bahia in Brazil.

=== Infantry landing ship (headquarters) ===
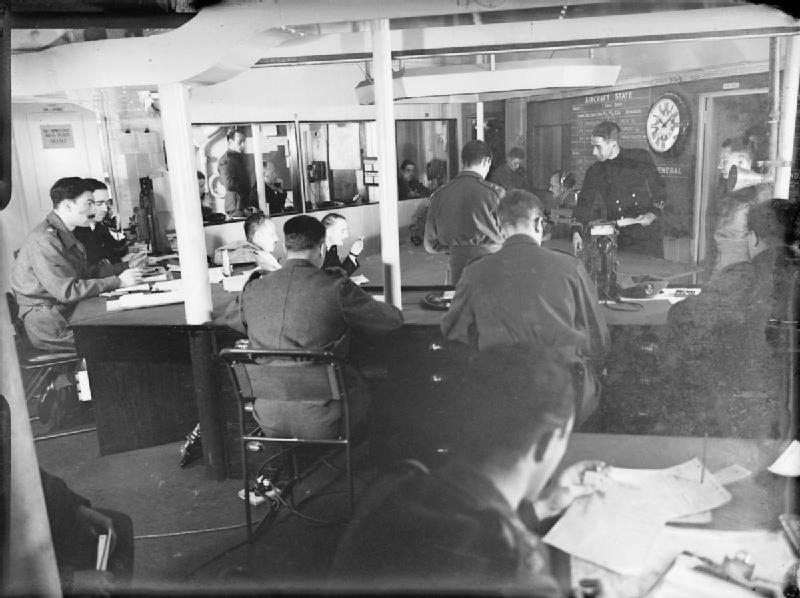
Hilary's operations room at dawn on 10 July, the first day of Operation Husky

The Admiralty then requisitioned Hilary a second time. She was converted at Birkenhead into an infantry landing ship (headquarters), equipped with six landing craft and berths for 313 crew and 378 troops.

In July 1943 Hilary was Rear Admiral Philip Vian's headquarters ship in Operation Husky, the Allied invasion of Sicily. At the same time she carried elements of the 1st Canadian Division and Royal Marine Commandos.

In September 1943 Hilary was Flag Commodore Geoffrey Oliver's headquarters ship for Operation Avalanche, the Allied landing near Salerno. That December she returned to Britain and was based at Portsmouth.

In June 1944 Hilary was Commodore Oliver's headquarters ship for Force "J", and on the night of 5–6 June led Convoy J11 from Spithead to Juno Beach for the Normandy landings. On 13 June she was slightly damaged by a near miss by a bomb. On 23 June she became Admiral Vian's flagship for the Eastern Task Force, replacing HMS Scylla which had been damaged by a mine.

In 1945 the Admiralty decommissioned Hilary again.

== Post-war service ==
Booth sent Hilary to Birkenhead to be refitted for civilian service. Her third class accommodation was reduced to 138 berths but her first class was slightly increased to 93 berths. In March 1946 she returned to service between Liverpool and Brazil.

In 1956 Hilary was refitted in Antwerp. Her total capacity was reduced again, to 86 first class and 122 tourist class berths. Also in 1956, Elder, Dempster and Company chartered Hilary for its service between Liverpool and Lagos. For this her hull was painted white, making her the first Booth ship to have a white hull. In 1957 Hilary returned to her Booth Line service between Liverpool and the Amazon River.

On 15 September 1959 Hilary arrived at Inverkeithing on the Firth of Forth at the yard of Thos. W. Ward, where she was broken up for scrap.

== See also ==
HMS Crispin

== Bibliography ==
- John, AH (1959). A Liverpool Merchant House. London: George Allen & Unwin Ltd.
- Osborne, Richard; Spong, Harry & Grover, Tom (2007). Armed Merchant Cruisers 1878–1945. Windsor: World Warship Society. ISBN 978-0-9543310-8-5.
