= Benjamin Franklin Butler (lawyer) =

American politician (1795–1858)

Benjamin Butler
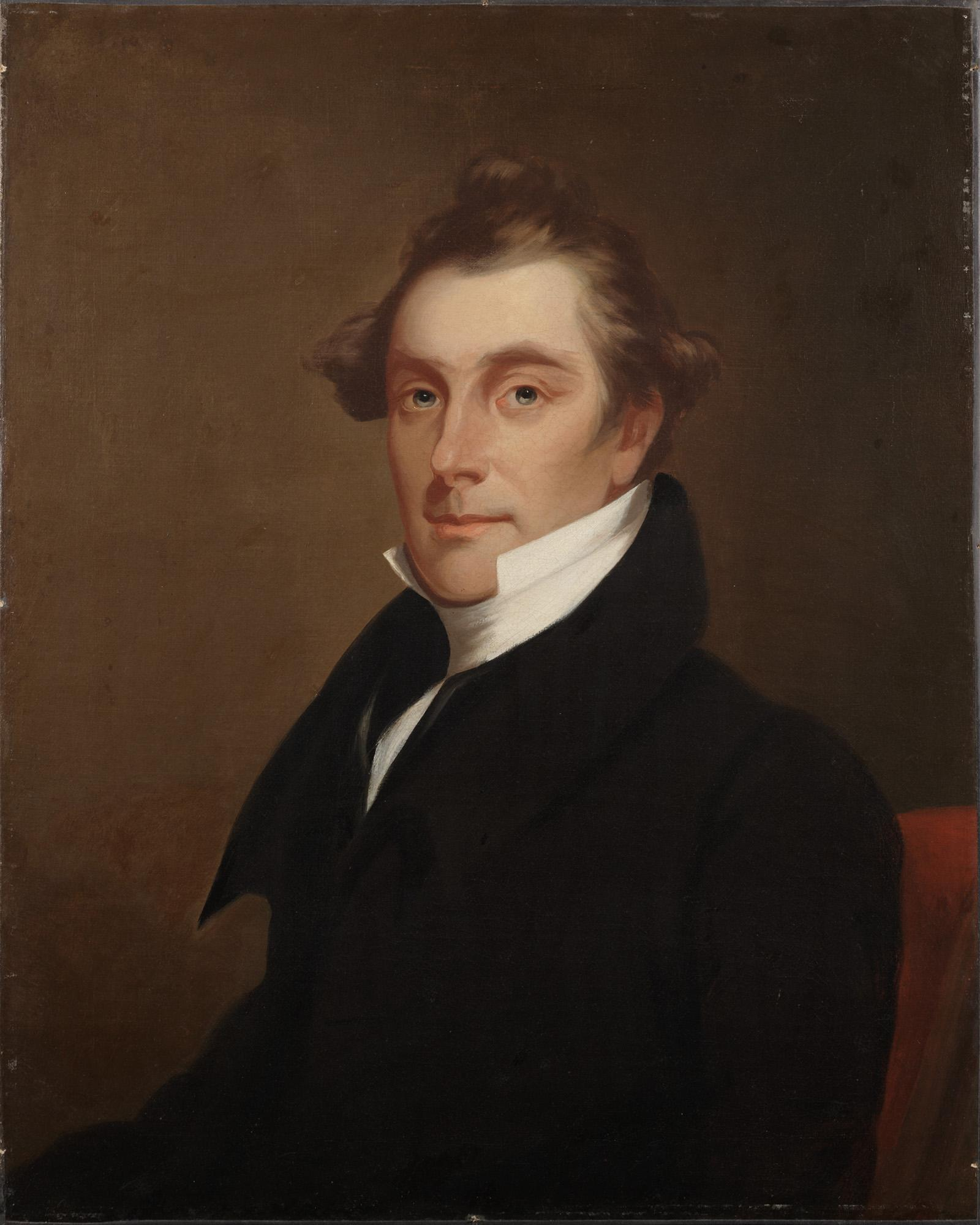

United States Attorney for the Southern District of New York
- In office March 14, 1845 – September 1, 1848
- President: James K. Polk
- Preceded by: Ogden Hoffman
- Succeeded by: Charles McVean
- In office December 10, 1838 – March 12, 1841
- President: Martin Van Buren
- Preceded by: William Price
- Succeeded by: Ogden Hoffman

12th United States Attorney General
- In office November 15, 1833 – July 4, 1838
- President: Andrew Jackson; Martin Van Buren
- Preceded by: Roger B. Taney
- Succeeded by: Felix Grundy

Member of the New York State Assembly from Albany County
- In office January 1, 1828 – December 31, 1828 Serving with William N. Sill, David I. D. Verplanck
- Preceded by: Isaac Hamilton, John Haswell, Henry Stone
- Succeeded by: James D. Gardner, Moses Stanton, Chandler Starr

District Attorney of Albany County
- In office February 19, 1821 – June 14, 1825
- Preceded by: Samuel Foot
- Succeeded by: Edward Livingston

Personal details
- Born: Benjamin Franklin Butler; December 17, 1795 Kinderhook Landing, New York, U.S.
- Died: November 8, 1858 (aged 62) Paris, France
- Resting place: Woodlawn Cemetery, The Bronx, New York
- Party: Democratic
- Spouse: Harriet Allen (m. 1818-1853, her death)
- Children: 9, including William Allen Butler
- Relatives: Alfred Booth (Grandson)

Benjamin Franklin Butler (December 17, 1795 – November 8, 1858) was a lawyer from the state of New York. A professional and political ally of Martin Van Buren, among the many elective and appointive positions he held were Attorney General of the United States and United States Attorney for the Southern District of New York. He was also a founder of New York University and one of the founders of the Children's Village school in New York City.

== Early life ==
He was the son of Medad Butler and Hannah Butler (née Tylee) of Kinderhook Landing, in Columbia County, New York. He studied at Hudson Academy in Hudson, New York, and read law with Martin Van Buren, whose son John Van Buren later read law with Butler.

Butler was admitted to the bar in 1817, and became Martin Van Buren's partner. In his 1903 book The Art of Cross-Examination, author Francis L. Wellman indicated that Butler was regarded during his life as a highly effective trial lawyer, and one of the most successful cross-examiners of his day.

== Political career ==
Butler was one of the earliest members of the Albany Regency. When fellow Regency member and Van Buren ally Roger Skinner was appointed Judge of the United States District Court for the Northern District of New York in 1819, he sold his law office to Butler, who took over Skinner's clients and pending cases.

Butler began his political career as district attorney of Albany County, serving from 1821 to 1825. He was appointed one of the three commissioners to revise the State statutes in 1825. Butler was a member from Albany County of the New York State Assembly in 1828. In 1833, he served as commissioner for New York to adjust the New Jersey boundary line.

On November 15, 1833, President Andrew Jackson appointed Butler Attorney General, an office he held until 1838. From that year until 1841, and from 1845 to 1848, he was United States Attorney for the Southern District of New York.

He was a prominent participant in the 1844 Democratic National Convention. As one of the leaders of the New York delegation, he supported the candidacy of Martin Van Buren and opposed the 2/3 rule for nominating, but failed in both cases. In the end, he was the one to announce that the New York delegation would switch to eventual winner James K. Polk. Van Buren recommended Butler to Polk for a cabinet position but told Polk that he was loath to leave his lucrative law practice and so would not agree unless offered the office of Secretary of State. Polk ended up offering him Secretary of War, but Butler declined, stating that he would only accept State or Treasury.

He was also at the 1848 Free Soil Convention, where he helped write the party platform.

=== Legacy ===
Butler was a regent of the University of the State of New York from 1829 to 1832. He was instrumental in founding New York University in 1831 and served in various capacities with the university from its inception. He received the honorary degree of LL.D. from Rutgers University in 1834. He was appointed principal professor of New York University in 1837.

== Personal life ==
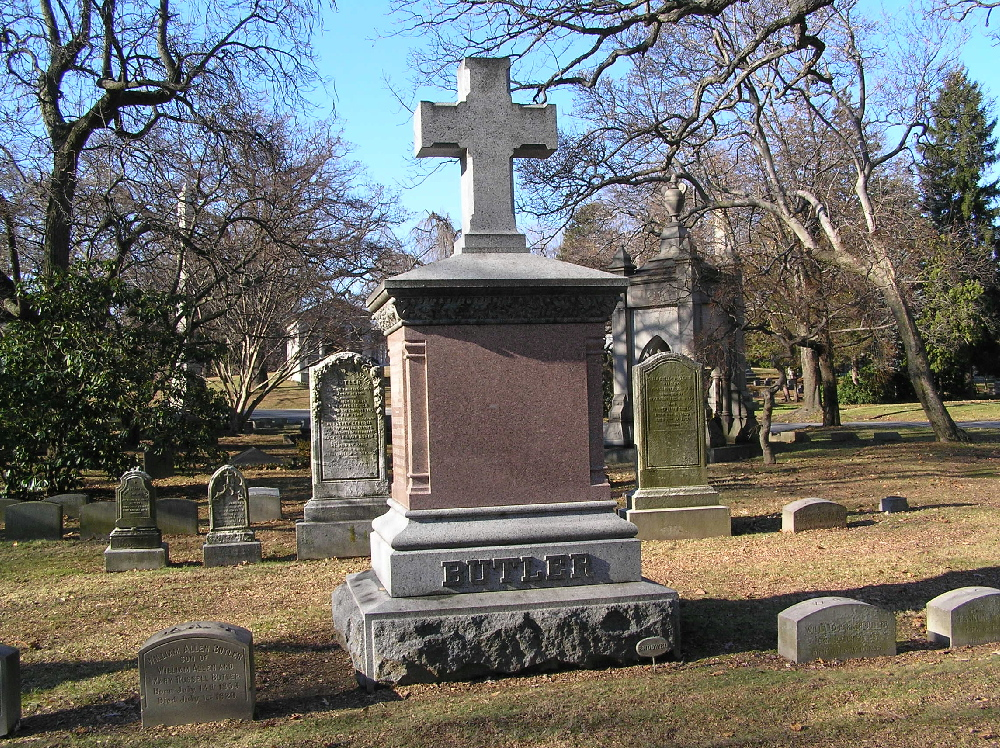
The monument of Benjamin Butler in Woodlawn Cemetery

In 1818, he married Harriet Allen; their children included attorney William Allen Butler, and Lydia Allen Butler, who married Alfred Booth and was the mother of Sir Alfred Allen Booth, 1st Baronet, a director of Alfred Booth and Company and chairman of Cunard.

While visiting Europe in 1858, he died in Paris, France. He was buried at Woodlawn Cemetery in The Bronx. Fort Butler, one of the main forts built for the forced removal of the Cherokee Indians on the Trail of Tears, was named for him.

== Published works ==
- Levy, Uriah Phillips; Butler, Benjamin F. (1858). Defence of Uriah P. Levy: Before the court of inquiry held at Washington City, November and December, 1857 (ebook). Washington D.C.: W. C. Gardner.

Legal offices
Preceded by Roger B. Taney	U.S. Attorney General; Served under: Andrew Jackson, Martin Van Buren; 1833–1838	Succeeded by Felix Grundy
