= Leonard E. Davies =

American lawyer and civil rights activist (born 1939)

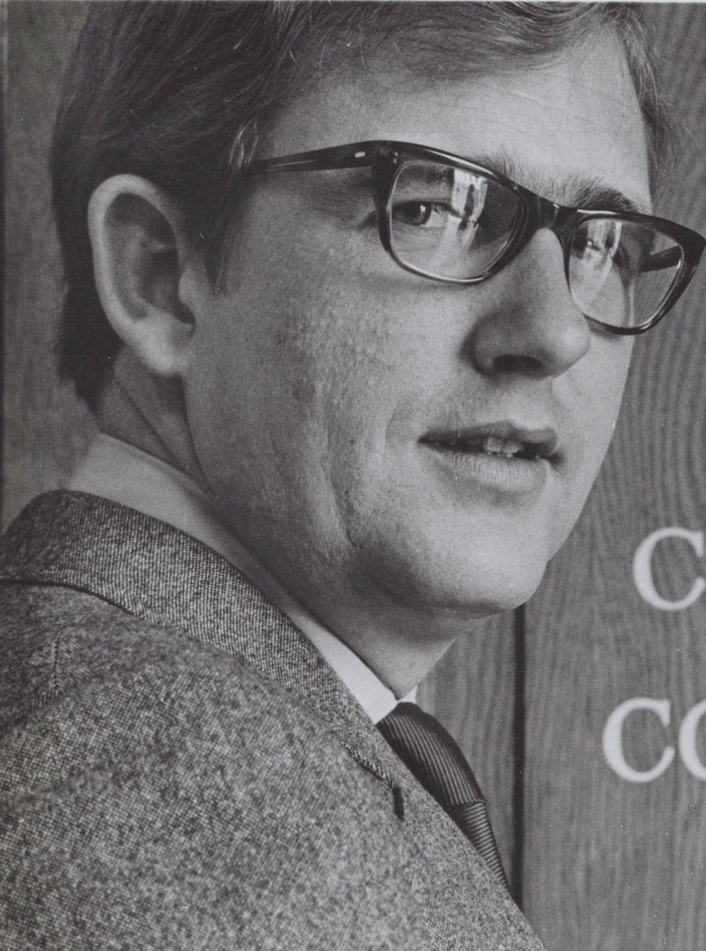
- Davies in 1970
- Born: Leonard Emlyn Davies; 7 November 1939 (age 86); Weymouth, England
- Citizenship: United States
- Education: San Francisco State University; University of Denver School of Law
- Occupations: Lawyer; civil rights activist; writer; painter
- Spouse: Susan Ayres Davies
- Children: 2
- Website: leonardedavies.com

Leonard Emlyn Davies (born November 7, 1939) is an American lawyer, civil rights activist, writer, and painter whose early work defending migrant farm workers and the Black Panther Party resulted in his participation in "The Trial: The City and County of Denver vs. Lauren R. Watson," the first criminal trial to be filmed in its entirety in the United States.

== Early life ==
Davies was born in Weymouth, England during a German bombing raid. His Welsh father, Emlyn Davies and American mother, Neva (Snedeker), met in New Mexico in 1934, and traveled to the U.K. in 1937. They were caught in the U.K. by the outbreak of World War II and remained the duration, Davies's father serving as an officer in a bomb disposal squad.

In 1946, Davies returned with his parents to the United States. Davies attended public schools in the Rio Grande Valley of New Mexico near Albuquerque and then Denver. He enlisted in the U.S. Army after graduation from Durango High School and served exclusively in the United States. He attended the University of New Mexico and then San Francisco State University, where he studied international relations.

In 1960, Davies married Susan Ayres, a descendant of two of the founding families of Durango, Colorado.

Davies and his wife moved to Denver, Colorado, where in 1963 he enrolled in the University of Denver School of Law.

== Civil rights career ==
While studying law at the University of Denver, Davies became acquainted with the criminologist Gresham Sykes, who enlisted him to work on a grant providing storefront legal services in Denver. The experience of working with clients in the extensive Denver Black and Latino communities would shape the unfolding of Davies's subsequent legal career.

=== San Francisco Mime Troupe ===
Davies was appointed to the Colorado Bar in April 1966.

In September of that year, the Denver Young Democrats sponsored two performances at the Phipps Auditorium by the San Francisco Mime Troupe. The program was entitled "The Minstrel Show or Civil Rights in a Cracker Barrel."

On the evening of the second performance, two plain clothed Denver Police vice squad detectives attended, directed to ascertain whether the performance was "obscene." The detectives found grounds for offense and called in support.

Twelve uniformed patrolmen and two attack dogs responded. When the cast, three of the men wearing exaggerated blackface, exited at the end of the show along with the audience, they were arrested in front of the auditorium. They were charged with lewd acts and use of indecent language. The Mime Troupe selected Davies with Walter Garash as co-counsel to represent the accused troupe members. Among the three men charged was a "Beatle-haired" young creative writing student at San Francisco State University named Peter Cohon.

At trial, a witness for the prosecution stated that he had taken his wife to the program, wanting to show her the sort of minstrel show he remembered seeing as a youth in Tennessee. "I'd seen minstrel shows before, but never one like that," the witness testified. His wife described the show as "vulgar, lewd, and quite profane," and that it gave her "a feeling of deep nausea."

Witnesses for the defense included two Colorado state representatives and a Lutheran minister who had been in the audience.

After a week-long trial the jury returned acquitted the three Mime Troupe members on the sole remaining charge of lewdness on the stage. The decision was considered a signal First Amendment ruling that would pave the way for future Mime Troupe defenses.

"We will return to Denver," said Cohon, one of the acquitted defendants. Cohon would soon thereafter change his name to Peter Coyote.

=== Neighborhood Law Center ===
With a paper written for a law school course taken with the criminologist Gresham Sykes, the two began collaborating on the notion of a storefront legal clinic. As Sykes later wrote, "the location of the law office in the neighborhood where the poor lived would help overcome the social distance and the physical distance which were apt to alienate the poor from the very service they needed." Likewise, most legal available indigent legal services operated only during standard business hours, further distancing the services from the access of the working poor. Next, legal aid societies, which at the time were a dominant vehicle of legal representation to the poor, were typically both overwhelmed and limited in the types of legal aid they might offer. It was in those limitations that Davies and Sykes found the signal problem. As Sykes wrote: "The legal rights of the poor...were all too often regarded not as rights but as privileges, even by legal aid societies."

In their conclusion, the most pressing legal rights of the poor were too often seen as a threat to the status quo. Constitutional challenges, conflicts with local businesses, and confrontations with governments, both local, state, and federal, were avoided by establishment legal aid societies that had "grown too staid and were financially dependent on the very elements in the community that would feel threatened by such activities."

The Office of Economic Opportunity responded with a legal services grant, which led to the creation of the Neighborhood Law Center, located in the Five Points/Curtis Park district of Denver, then a center of African-American and Latino poverty. The offices were established in a disused retail storefront retrofitted with three office cubicles, a reception desk, and a waiting area. The NLC differed from existing indigent legal aid in the cases it would entertain. Rather than the standard practice, the NLC would enjoin both divorces and bankruptcies. This met with strong opposition. These areas were considered the purview of the bar, not to be encroached on by free legal aid. However, a tenet of the founding of the NLC was that, as Sykes wrote, "The existing system of laws and regulations can and should be challenged at numerous points, for in a very fundamental sense the problems of the poor are often rooted in situations which are now held to be lawful or legitimate."

In over ten months of operation, the NLC handled over 1,700 cases. Its approach, to treat clients with an aim toward canvassing their entire legal circumstances, as compared to the then common practice of addressing only the issues for which the clients presented themselves for assistance. As Sykes wrote, "the exercise of one's legal rights is a fundamental part of what is meant by full participation in a democratic society."

The following year another and larger grant was awarded. In time, Howard Rosenberg, a professor at the University of Denver School of Law, would take over the roll of director. What began as the NLC in 1966 would become the foundation for a large clinical legal program today at the University of Denver Sturm College of Law.

=== University of Denver Sit-in ===
Over the next two years, Davies built on his experiences and connections made at the storefront legal clinic to represent a number of important civil rights causes along the Eastern Slope of Colorado. Among them were the Crusade for Justice, founded by Corky Gonzales and the cause of migrant beet harvesters working around Greeley and Ft. Lupton, Colorado.

He won the dismissal of charges against 23 students of the University of Denver who had staged a sit-in at the DU registrar's office: the judge found, on the motion by the defense, that the ordinance the students were charged with violating, prohibiting loitering, annoying, disturbing the orderly conduct of classes at academic institutions, had been written with only convicted sex offenders in mind.

=== The Trial: The City and County of Denver vs. Lauren R. Watson ===
On November 6, 1968 four Denver policemen subdued and arrested Lauren R. Watson leader of the Denver Black Panther Party and arrested him on charges of resisting arrest and resisting a police officer.

The arresting officer, Robert C. Cantwell, who would go on to become director of the Colorado Bureau of Investigation, claimed that Watson had been speeding and, after pulling over, had driven away, only to be further pursued by the patrolman and finally taken into custody with the assistance of other officers.

Watson presented a different version. Earlier in the day, Cantwell had driven slowly in his patrol car past Watson's house, yelling to Watson, who was on his porch, about Nixon's presidential victory the day before and ending with a shout of "White power!"

Colorado was the first state in the U.S. that allowed cameras into the courtroom. With funding from National Education Television, the Academy Award-winning documentary filmmakers Robert Fresco and Denis Sanders approached all parties involved with the controversial proposal of filming the entirety of the trial. The result, Trial: The City and County of Denver vs. Lauren R. Watson was broadcast nationally over four nights in March 1970.

Future Federal Judge Zita Weinshienk presided. Watson was acquitted on all counts and in an interview following the verdict, made an impassioned speech. The simple verdict of not guilty, he argued, did nothing to alleviate the pain black Americans continued to suffer every day.

=== Reies Tijerina and the Tierra Amarilla Courthouse Raid ===
By way of his work with the Crusade for Justice, Davies was asked to represent Reies Tijerina on Federal trespassing and vandalism at Echo Amphitheater in New Mexico. These charges sprang from New Mexico state charges related to the Tierra Amarilla Courthouse Raid. When county officials moved to break up a meeting of the Alianza Federal de Mercedes being led by Tijerina. Resistance ensued. Two Alianza members were arrested. "

On the assumption that the prisoners were still being held in the Tierra Amarilla courthouse, Tijerina and his backers moved to make a citizen's arrest of the local district attorney on charges of false imprisonment and unlawful police action. The D.A., Alfonso Sánchez, was not at the courthouse when Tijerina and his supporters arrived. Versions of events differed, but all agreed that chaos ensued. Over the course of two hours, multiple shots were fired and both a prison guard and a deputy sheriff were injured."

While Tijerina defended himself on state charges, Davies represented him on the Federal charges at trial in the 10th Circuit, New Mexico District in Albuquerque. By that point, the Tierra Amarilla Courthouse Raid had attracted international attention to Tijerina and his Land Grant Movement cause.

== World Agricultural Systems and The Fight to Reverse Post-Harvest Losses ==
In the late 1970s, Davies turned his attention to a problem he had been awoken to through his defense of a Kansas wheat farmer. While the U.S. donated huge volumes of grain aid to countries in need around the world, substandard or, often more likely, nonexistent grain storage facilities would lead to loss and spoilage often amounting to 40 percent of the donated grain. The loss often equalled the shortfall from need experienced annually by the recipient countries, because suitable grain storage was too expensive to build. .

Davies set about the problem as one of civil rights. As in his legal practice, where he found that the law was regularly not being fairly applied, particularly to the poor, minorities, and women, the fact was that the U.S. was donating sufficient grain to starving countries. The countries themselves had no way of storing the aid.

In 1979 TK Davies founded InterAg, a precursor to a subsequent concern, World Agricultural Systems. Beginning with coffee harvests in Colombia and sorghum harvests in Mexico, he began experimenting with various extremely low-cost ways of storing harvested grains. In the Mexican state of Tamaulipas, blowers piled sorghum silage to be covered by a specially fabricated type of tarpaulin and condensed with metal cords strung through locally obtained waste tires.

In his research Davies came across an Idahoan engineer named David South who had converted his childhood fascination with domes to found Monolithic Dome, a company he began by building a 35-foot-high dome potato storage structure near his home. While he was expanding principally into economic cold storage, South immediately saw how his patented structure with its low cost and low technological entry point would be ideally suited for use as a grain storage facility in a developing country. With a grant from U.S. A.I.D., Davies and South and their teams settled on Souma, Algeria for their test project.

In a short period of time and on a shoestring budget, the huge volume of cement need for the structure, for example, was produced in a portable mixer, the project, a 60 foot tall solid clad cement dome, was completed. As negotiations were underway for the next Algerian facility, the political situation in the country deteriorated. At one point, in meeting with the newly installed Secretary of the Interior for Algeria, Davies was accused of being an agent for the CIA and stealing documents. Davies left the country shortly thereafter on the advice of the ambassador; by December of that year the country had slipped into civil war.

== Return to the Law ==
Back in Colorado, Davies was again drawn into high-profile cases that emanated from the penny stock scandals. Joseph Pignatiello had been swept up in an FBI sting operation related to the fraudulent promotion of penny stocks.

In 2001, Davies represented Meyer Blinder, the self-proclaimed "King of the Penny Stocks" a penny stock trader.

Davies last major case was the much-publicized "Black Widow" trial in Steamboat Springs, Colorado, where he represented multiple murder suspect Jill Coit's accused co-conspirator, Michael Backus. Coit, who had been married by one count ten times, allegedly beat, stun-gunned, and shot her penultimate husband in a dispute over a lien the victim, Gerry Boggs, had on Coit's bed and breakfast, which he had invested in when the coupled were married. Notably, the bed and breakfast was run principally by Coit's son, Seth. Seth Coit became a principal witness for the prosecution, though doubts lingered over the blanket immunity he was granted. Despite suspicions, Seth Coit testified that his mother had asked him to murder Boggs. On cross-examination, he denied directly having played any role in Boggs's murder.

Michael Backus claimed that he and Jill Coit were camping in Kelly Flats, two and a half hours away, 6,600 feet in altitude, and in late October. Davies made several motions to separate the cases but all were denied. Backus was submitted to a trial that mainly regarded the extraordinary career of his co-defendant. Genuine questions existed as to whether Backus participated in the murder. Nevertheless, Backus refused to testify against Coit. The two were found guilty. Backus is currently serving a sentence of life without parole at the Limon Correctional Facility in Limon, Colorado.

== Books ==
At the instigation of Prentice Hall publishers, Davies wrote a history and hornbook of cross-examination, taking his cue from the famous The Art of Cross-Examination by Francis L. Wellman. Davies's book, Anatomy of Cross-Examination, was published in 1996. He also published a novel in 2000 based, in part, on his experiences with Reies Tijerina and the Alianza Federal de Mercedes, Sangre de Cristo, in 2000.

== Painting ==
After retirement from legal practice Davies returned to a lifelong interest in painting and began studying plein air and Western landscape work. His work has been featured in group shows at the Durango Arts Center and two solo shows at the Galeries of the Abiquiu Inn.
