= SMSA =

SMSA may refer to:

- Sydney Mechanics' School of Arts, in Sydney, NSW, Australia
- St. Mary's Springs Academy, in Milwaukee, Wisconsin, USA
- Standard Metropolitan Statistical Area
- Satrio airport (ICAO airport code: SMSA) in Suriname, see List of airports in Suriname
- Singapore Motor Sports Association, see List of FIA member organisations
- SMS-1 weather satellite, formerly SMS-A
- MV Wotan, formerly SMS-A
