= Alfred Allen Booth =

British businessman and shipbuilder (1872–1948)

Sir Alfred Allen Booth Bt
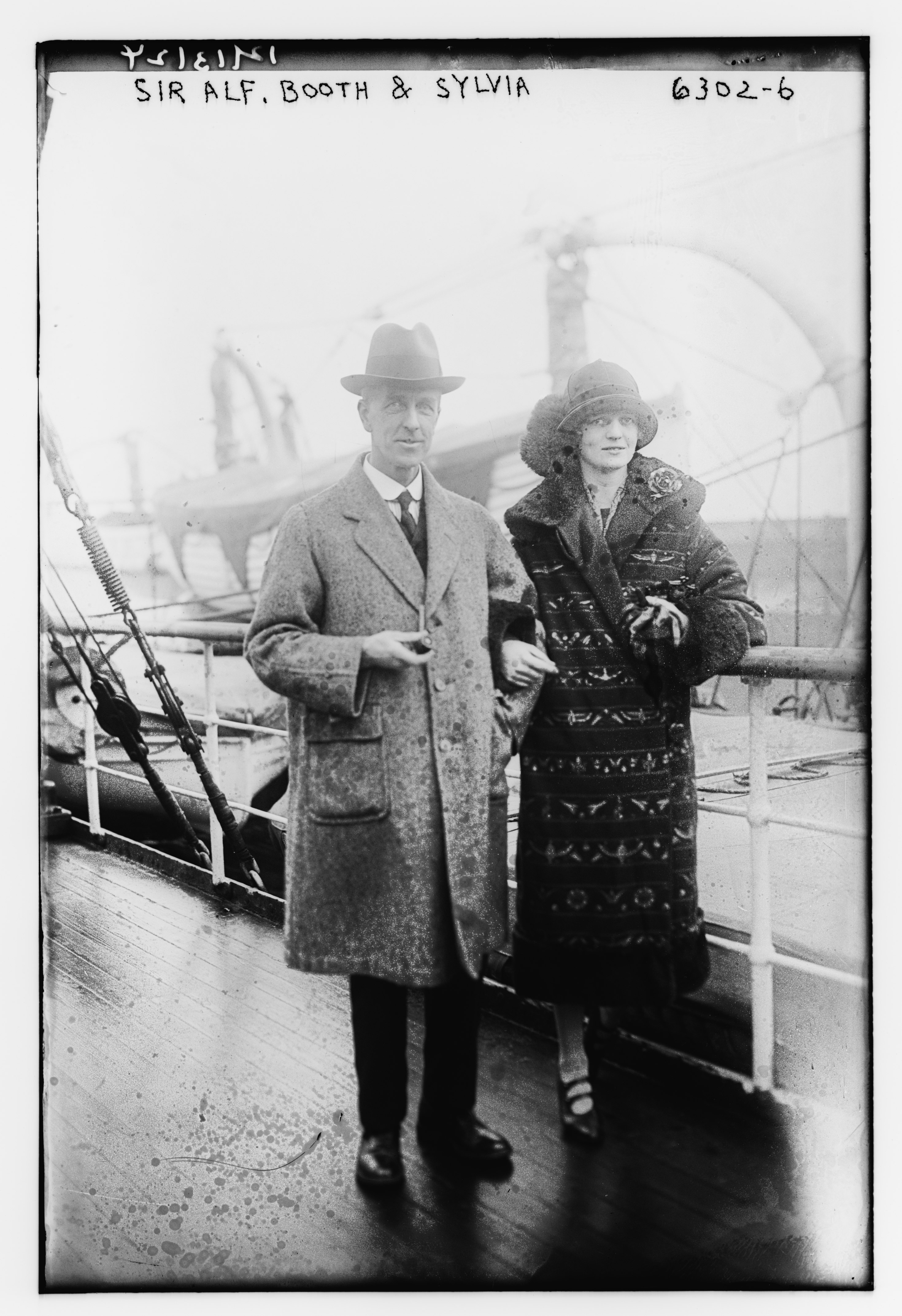
- Booth with his daughter Sylvia in 1900
- Born: 17 September 1872
- Died: 13 March 1948
- Education: King's College, Cambridge
- Occupation: Shipowner
- Spouses: Mary Blake Dwight (m. 1903); Margaret Lucy Brightwen (m. 1925)
- Parent(s): Alfred Booth; Lydia Allen Butler

Sir Alfred Allen Booth, 1st Baronet (17 September 1872 – 13 March 1948) was a British businessman and shipowner. A scion of the Booths of Dunham Massey, Cheshire, his great-grandfather moved to Liverpool in the mid-18th century.

Booth was created a baronet in 1916 by Prime Minister H. H. Asquith for supporting Britain's war effort and services to industry.

Booth family coat of arms

== Biography ==
=== Early life ===
Born on 17 September 1872, the son of Alfred Booth and Lydia Allen Butler. His maternal grandfather was Benjamin Franklin Butler (1795 – 8 November 1858), who served as the 12th Attorney General of the United States from 1833 to 1838.

Booth was educated at Harrow School, before going up to King's College, Cambridge, where he graduated as Master of Arts.

=== Career ===
Booth served on the board of directors of the Cunard Steamship Company (now a subsidiary of Carnival Corporation & plc) and the Alfred Booth and Company. On 24 January 1916 he was honoured with a baronetcy, under the territorial designation of Allerton Beeches, City of Liverpool.

Sir Alfred received the honorary degree of Doctor of Laws (LL.D.) from Liverpool University.

=== Personal life ===
On 15 December 1903 Booth married firstly Mary Blake Dwight. On 9 November 1925 he married secondly Margaret Lucy Brightwen. They had two sons, Sir Philip Booth, 2nd Baronet, (1907–1960) and Major Edmund Booth (1908–1985) and one daughter, Sylvia Emily Booth (1905–1968). Sir Alfred died on 13 March 1948.

He was a cousin of fellow shipping magnate Paul Crompton, who, along with his wife and children, died in the sinking of the RMS Lusitania in 1915.

== See also ==
- Booth baronets

Baronetage of the United Kingdom
New creation	Baronet (of Allerton Beeches); 1916–1948	Succeeded by Sir Philip Booth
