= HMS Crispin (1940) =

Coordinates: 66°38′N 20°05′W

History

United Kingdom
- Name: Crispin
- Namesake: Crispin
- Owner: Booth Steamship Co
- Operator: 1935: Booth Steamship Co; 1940: Royal Navy
- Port of registry: (United Kingdom) Liverpool
- Route: 1935–40: Liverpool – Brazil
- Ordered: 1934
- Builder: Cammell, Laird, Birkenhead
- Yard number: 1001
- Launched: 7 December 1934
- Completed: March 1935
- Reclassified: 1940: ocean boarding vessel
- Identification: UK official number 164256; call sign GYDZ
- Fate: Sunk by torpedo, 3–4 February 1941

General characteristics
- Type: Cargo ship
- Tonnage: 5,051 GRT, 3,082 NRT
- Length: 412.2 ft (125.6 m)
- Beam: 55.7 ft (17.0 m)
- Draught: 25 ft 7 1/2 in (7.81 m)
- Depth: 26.0 ft (7.9 m)
- Decks: 1
- Installed power: 603 NHP
- Propulsion: triple-expansion engine; low-pressure steam turbine; single screw
- Speed: 13 knots (24 km/h)
- Crew: as ocean boarding vessel: 141
- Sensors & processing systems: wireless direction finding
- Armament: 2 × 6-inch guns; "light anti-aircraft guns"
- Notes: sister ship: Clement

HMS Crispin was a British cargo steamship that was launched in England in 1934 and operated by Alfred Booth and Company between Liverpool and the east coast of South America. In 1940 the British Admiralty requisitioned her and had her converted into an ocean boarding vessel. In 1941 a U-boat sank her in the Battle of the Atlantic, killing 20 of her crew.

This was the second of five Booth Line ships called Crispin. The first was a steamship that was built in 1907 and sunk by enemy action in 1917. The others were post-war cargo ships.

She was the first of two Royal Navy ships to have been called Crispin. The second HMS Crispin was a C-class destroyer that was launched in 1945 and sold in 1956.

== Building ==
The Great Depression that began in 1929 caused a global slump in merchant shipping. Booth Line responded by renewing its fleet, selling 11 older ships and replacing them with a smaller number of new ones. Early in 1934 it ordered two cargo ships from Cammell, Laird of Birkenhead. Clement was launched on 11 October 1934 and completed that December. Her sister ship Crispin was launched on 7 December 1934 and completed in March 1935.

Crispin had a single propeller. Her main engine was a three-cylinder triple-expansion steam engine. Exhaust steam from its low-pressure cylinder powered a Bauer-Wach steam turbine, which drove the same propeller shaft via double-reduction gearing and a Föttinger fluid coupling. The combined power of her piston engine and turbine was rated at 603 NHP, and gave her a speed of 13 knots (24 km/h).

Crispin was registered in Liverpool. Her UK official number was 164256 and her call sign was GYDZ.

== Second World War civilian service ==
For the first 12 months of the Second World War Crispin continued her usual trade between Liverpool and various ports in Brazil. She began her outward voyages from Liverpool by sailing in OB (Outward Bound) convoys, each of which would disperse in the North Atlantic after a few days sailing.

For her homeward voyages to Liverpool Crispin usually went via the east coast of the US and Halifax, Nova Scotia, calling at New York and sometimes other ports, and then joining an HX convoy for her eastbound transatlantic crossing. In May 1940 Crispin instead returned from Brazil to Liverpool via Freetown in Sierra Leone, where she joined Convoy SL 31 to Liverpool.

== Ocean boarding vessel ==
In August 1940 the Admiralty requisitioned Crispin, and she sailed from Liverpool around the north of Scotland to Middlesbrough to be converted into an ocean boarding vessel. Her DEMS armament was replaced with two 6-inch guns and an unspecified number of "light anti-aircraft guns". She was commissioned into the Royal Navy as HMS Crispin.

On 31 January 1941 Crispin left Liverpool as one of the escorts of Convoy OB 280. On 3 February the convoy dispersed in the North Atlantic. Crispin headed for home along with the corvette HMS Arbutus, armed yacht Philante and rescue ship Copeland.

At 2333 hours that evening Crispin was north-northwest of Rockall when U-107 hit her with one torpedo in her engine room. Crispin did not immediately sink, but 20 members of her crew were killed. Copeland rescued eight of the survivors. Another of OB 280's escorts, the destroyer HMS Harvester, rescued the remainder. On 4 February Crispin sank. All 121 survivors were landed at Liverpool.

The Republic of Ireland's National Monuments Service records Crispin as wreck number W09568, 450 nautical miles (830 km) west-northwest of Tory Island, County Donegal.

== See also ==
HMS Hilary

== Bibliography ==
- John, AH (1959). A Liverpool Merchant House. London: George Allen & Unwin Ltd.
