= SS Kleinella =

A number of steamships have been named Kleinella, including:

- SS Kleinella (1913), a British tanker in service 1948–53
- SS Kleinella (1942), a British tanker in service 1946–48
