= Quaternary Research =

- Discipline: Quaternary science
- Language: English
- Edited by: Derek B. Booth, Nicholas Lancaster, Lewis A. Owen

Publication details
- History: 1970-present
- Publisher: Cambridge University Press
- Frequency: Bimonthly
- Impact factor: 2.198 (2015)

Standard abbreviations
- ISO 4: Quat. Res.

Indexing
- ISSN: 0033-5894

Links
- Journal homepage; Online access

Quaternary Research is a peer-reviewed scientific journal of Quaternary science. The journal was established in 1970, is now published by Cambridge University Press, and is edited by Derek B. Booth, Nicholas Lancaster and Lewis A. Owen. Previous editors included A. Lincoln Washburn, Estella B. Leopold, Stephen C. Porter, Eric Steig, and Alan R. Gillespie.

== Abstracting and indexing ==
The journal is abstracted and Indexed by: CABI, British and Irish Archaeological Bibliography, EBSCO, GEOBASE, Scopus, Gale, International Atomic Energy Agency, PubMed, Ovid, ProQuest, Web of Science, GeoRefIts.

The latest impact factor (2020) was 2.31.
