= HMHS Lanfranc =

Coordinates: 50°06′36″N 0°07′12″E

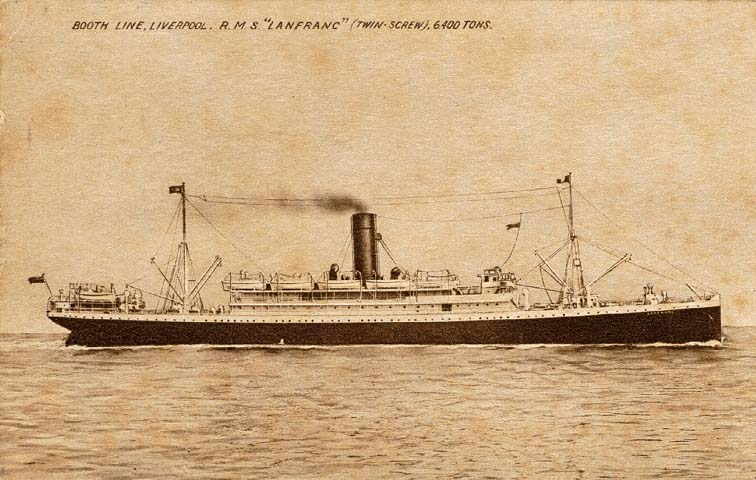
- Lanfranc under way

History

United Kingdom
- Name: Lanfranc
- Namesake: Lanfranc
- Owner: Booth Steamship Co
- Operator: Booth Steamship Co 1907–14; (United Kingdom) Royal Navy 1914–17
- Port of registry: (United Kingdom) Liverpool
- Route: Liverpool – Brazil
- Builder: Caledon Shipbldg & Eng Co, Dundee
- Cost: £122,000
- Yard number: 189
- Launched: 18 October 1906
- Completed: February 1907
- Identification: UK official number 124034; Code letters HKDM; Call sign MDS
- Fate: Torpedoed and sunk on 17 April 1917

General characteristics
- Type: 1907: Ocean liner; 1914: Hospital ship
- Tonnage: 6,275 GRT, 3,655 NRT
- Length: 418.5 ft (127.6 m)
- Beam: 52.2 ft (15.9 m)
- Installed power: 850 NHP
- Propulsion: 2 × triple-expansion engines; 2 × screws
- Speed: 12 knots (22 km/h; 14 mph)
- Capacity: as hospital ship: 403 wounded
- Crew: 123, plus 52 RAMC personnel as hospital ship

HMHS Lanfranc was a Booth Line passenger steamship that was built in Scotland in 1907 and operated scheduled services between Liverpool and Brazil until 1914. In the First World War she was a hospital ship until a U-boat sank her in the English Channel in 1917.

This was the second Lanfranc in Booth's fleet. The first was an iron-hulled steamship that was built in 1884, sold in 1898 and renamed Olympia.

== Building ==
Booth's operated scheduled cargo liner and passenger services between Europe and Brazil. In the first decade of the 20th century these services included regular sailings between Liverpool and Manaus, 1,000 miles (1,600 km) up the Amazon River. A Booth passenger ship would leave Liverpool for Manaus on or about the 10th, 20th and 30th day of each month.

Lanfranc was the first Booth ship with twin screws. Each screw was driven by a three-cylinder triple-expansion engine. Between them the two engines were rated at 850 NHP and gave her a speed of 12 knots (22 km/h; 14 mph).

The Caledon Shipbuilding & Engineering Company of Dundee built Lanfranc for £122,000. She was launched on 18 October 1906 and completed in February 1907. She was registered in Liverpool. Her UK official number was 124034 and her code letters were HKDM.

Lanfranc was joined by two sister ships. R&W Hawthorn, Leslie and Company launched Antony on 11 November 1906 and completed her in February 1907. Caledon Shipbuilding and Engineering launched Hilary on 31 March 1908 and completed her that August.

Lanfranc's tonnages were 6,275 gross register tons (GRT) and 3,655 net register tons (NRT). She and her sisters were the largest ships in Booth's fleet until Scotts Shipbuilding and Engineering Company launched Hildebrand in 1911.

By 1911 Lanfranc had a wireless telegraphy installation aboard, operated by the Marconi Company. Her call sign was MDS.

== First World War service and loss ==
By September 1914 the British Admiralty had requisitioned several Booth ships, including Lanfranc and her sisters. Lanfranc was converted into a hospital ship with capacity for 403 wounded.

The Hague Conventions protected hospital ships in wartime. They were painted white, with a broad green waistband and large red crosses. At night they were fully lit, unlike all other ships of the belligerent powers, which were blacked out. However, in the First World War the Central Powers attacked a number of hospital ships, so by 1917 Allied hospital ships were sailing blacked out and with naval escorts.

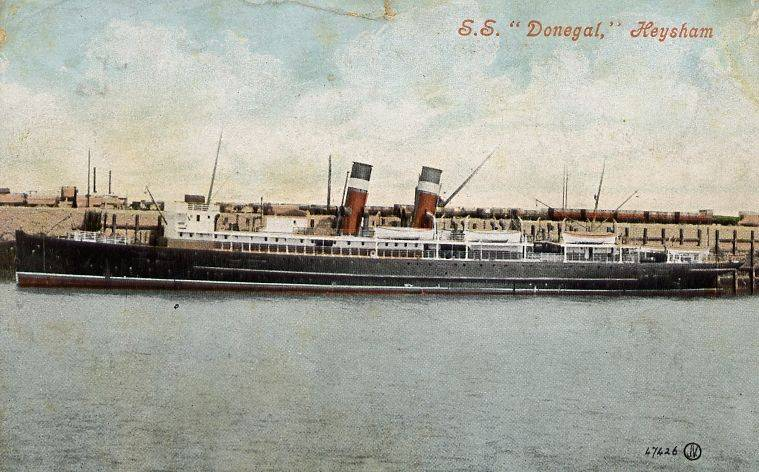
The ambulance ship Donegal was sunk on the same night as Lanfranc

On 17 April 1917 Lanfranc and an "ambulance ship", Donegal, embarked wounded personnel at Le Havre to take to England. Lanfranc embarked 234 British and 167 German wounded and departed for Southampton. 326 of the wounded were bed-ridden, many of them with serious wounds including fractured femurs and amputations.

At about 1930 hrs SM UB-40 torpedoed Lanfranc about 42 nautical miles (78 km; 48 mi) north of Le Havre. 34 people were killed: 13 British wounded, 15 German wounded, five crew and one member of her RAMC personnel. Royal Navy patrol vessels rescued survivors, including 152 of the German wounded.

On the same night SM UC-21 sank Donegal, killing 40 of the people aboard.

== See also ==
- List of hospital ships sunk in World War I

== Bibliography ==
- Anonymous (1917). The War on hospital ships, from the narratives of eye-witnesses (1917). London: T Fisher Unwin. pp. 8–9.
- John, AH (1959). A Liverpool Merchant House. London: George Allen & Unwin Ltd.
- The Marconi Press Agency Ltd (1913). The Year Book of Wireless Telegraphy and Telephony. London: The St Katherine Press.
