= Drak Pack =

1980 animated television series

- Promotional art for The Drak Pack, from left to right: Toad, Dr. Dred, Vampira, Frankie, Drak Jr., Howler and "Big D" a.k.a. Dracula
- Genre: Adventure
- Written by: Doug Booth; Larz Bourne; Glenn Leopold; Cliff Roberts
- Directed by: Chris Cuddington
- Voices of: William Callaway; Hans Conried; Jerry Dexter; Chuck McCann; Julie McWhirter; Don Messick; Alan Oppenheimer
- Narrated by: John Stephenson (opening narration)
- Countries of origin: United States; Australia
- Original language: English
- No. of episodes: 16

Production
- Executive producers: William Hanna; Joseph Barbera
- Producers: Doug Paterson; Art Scott
- Running time: 30 minutes
- Production company: Hanna-Barbera Pty. Ltd.

Original release
- Network: CBS
- Release: September 6 – December 20, 1980

Drak Pack is a 1980 animated television series about the classic Universal Monsters villains fighting for good. It aired in the United States on CBS Saturday Morning from September 6 to December 20, 1980. It was produced by the Australian division of Hanna-Barbera.

== Premise ==
"From the monsters of the past, comes a new generation. Dedicated to reversing the evil image of their forefathers. Under the leadership of none other than Count Dracula, known as Big D. Three teenagers form the do-gooder group named The Drak Pack. With special powers, they can transform into super mighty monsters and use their skills against all evil-doers. Especially the diabolical Dr. Dred and his renegade rowdies: Toad, Fly, Mummy Man and Vampira. A group known as O.G.R.E. The Organization of Generally Rotten Enterprises. It's right versus wrong, good over greed, niceness against naughtiness. That's the dedication of the terrific trio: Frankie, Howler and Drak Jr., The Drak Pack!"

— Opening narration by John Stephenson.

The series centers on three young men: Drak Jr., Frankie and Howler, descendants of Count Dracula, the Frankenstein monster, and the Wolf Man. To atone for their ancestors' wrongdoings, the three, united as the Drak Pack, became superheroes.

They appear initially as normal humans, but whenever trouble arises, they strike their right hands together and shout "Wacko!" This is called the Drak Whack. They then transform into a vampire, a Frankenstein monster, and a werewolf, respectively.

Their principal mode of transport is an amphibious flying car which they called "the Drakster".

The Drak Pack's principal opponent is Dr. Dred, a blue-skinned evil genius. His evil organization O.G.R.E. ("The Organization of Generally Rotten Enterprises" or "Endeavours") includes Toad, Fly, Mummyman, and Vampira.

When the Drak Pack needs counsel, they go to Drak's great-great-uncle Count Dracula himself, known to the team as "Big D".

== Characters ==
- Drak Jr. (voiced by Jerry Dexter) is the great-great-grandnephew of Count Dracula and leader of the Drak Pack. Drak's powers include flight, telekinesis, changing shape, and walking on walls. Unlike most cartoon vampires, Drak may assume a variety of forms, although he favors a bat.
- Frankie (voiced by William Callaway) is the descendant of the Frankenstein Monster. Frankie has superhuman strength and can emit electrical charges from the bolts in his neck whenever he gets angry.
- Howler (voiced by William Callaway) is the descendant of the Wolf Man, and has an ultrasonic howl and super-breath.
- Count Dracula (voiced by Alan Oppenheimer) is Drak's great-great-granduncle, who the Drak Pack turn to when they need his counsel. The Drak Pack refers to him as "Big D". Count Dracula is the president of the Transylvania Retired Spooks, Spectres, and Spirits Society. He also has a pet spider in the series that often gets injured when Count Dracula is giving the Drak Pack orders.
- OGRE, short for "The Organization of Generally Rotten Enterprises" or "Endeavours", is the principal antagonist of the series. OGRE's headquarters is an artificial island called "the Dredquarters", but occasionally called "the Drednought" and "OGRE Island". They travel in an airship that Dr. Dred calls the "Dredgible".
  - Dr. Dred (voiced by Hans Conried) is a blue-skinned evil genius and the leader of OGRE.
  - Toad (voiced by Don Messick) is Dr. Dred's toad-like right-hand minion and a member of OGRE. Very often, he unwittingly assists the Drak Pack.
  - Fly (voiced by Don Messick) is a humanoid fly and a member of OGRE who buzzes, flies, and walks on ceilings.
  - Mummyman (voiced by Chuck McCann) is a large mumbling mummy and a member of OGRE. He has super-strength and can stretch his wrappings indefinitely, often using them to tie up the Drak Pack.
  - Vampira (voiced by Julie McWhirter) is a female vampire with shapeshifting powers similar to Drak's and a member of OGRE. She has something of an unrequited crush on Drak.

== Episodes ==
No.	Title	Original release date
1	"Color Me Dredful"	September 6, 1980
Dr. Dred is feeling like a failure because the Drak Pack has defeated him so often, so he builds a color collector that steals the color from anything the ray hits. His first victims are the Drak Pack.
2	"Mind Your Manners, Dr. Dred"	September 13, 1980
Dr. Dred plots to steal the golden artifacts of the Egyptian King Tut-Tut and put the blame on the Drak Pack.
3	"Happy Birthday, Dr. Dred"	September 20, 1980
It is Dr. Dred's birthday and he is upset. It seems that the "birthday cake" that Toad baked was a bit too small: a cupcake. Dr. Dred is determined to celebrate his day in high style, letting everyone know that it is his birthday.
4	"Dreadful Weather We're Having"	September 27, 1980
Drak, Frankie, and Howler are on vacation, but Dr. Dred follows them. Dred uses a weather machine — a little gold teapot with a lightning bolt on the side (the "tempest in a teapot") hooked up to a computer to amplify its power: to create a snowstorm in summer.
5	"Perilous Plunder of Pirate's Park"	October 4, 1980
There is a new park in town called Pirate's Park. Dr. Dred and OGRE are there to steal the lost treasure.
6	"Night of the Terbites"	October 11, 1980
Dr. Dred has a new invention called the Terbites. They are little pink eggs with little legs and feet, big teeth and bigger appetites. Upon command, the Terbites will eat anything. Meanwhile, Drak, Frankie, and Howler are going to a monster disco party.
7	"Time Out for Dr. Dred"	October 18, 1980
Dr. Dred creates a Time Stopper, which he tests out on an ocean liner. Mummyman and Fly rob the passengers. They must finish quickly, however, because the ray's effects only last for five minutes.
8	"Hideout Hotel"	October 25, 1980
This adventure begins with a beach scene in Florida. Suddenly, a sea monster appears and scares everyone off. The sea monster is Vampira in disguise, as OGRE takes over a local hotel where Dr. Dred has invited every criminal in hopes of joining forces with them. Meanwhile, it is winter in the Drak Pack's home city and Big D is in Florida for the Transylvania Retired Spooks, Spectres, and Spirits Society's convention that would serve as a reunion for the Class of 1702 at the hotel.
9	"Dred Goes Hollywood"	November 1, 1980
Drak, Frankie and Howler arrive at the movies for a big sneak preview of a new film. Dr. Dred comes on the screen, roaring like the MGM lion. The movie is of the Drak Pack, who have never made movies, doing mean things that the team never did.
10	"Dred's Photo Finish"	November 8, 1980
Dred calls a meeting of OGRE to show them a new invention called the Photo Grabber, which turns anything it photographs into photographs.
11	"Dr. Dred is a Shrinker"	November 15, 1980
Dr. Dred creates a shrinking ray. He uses it to shrink a train and sneaks into Fork Knox with it.
12	"A Dire Day at Dredfulland"	November 22, 1980
Dr. Dred builds an amusement park. All of the rides are rather disturbing (because they are real) and all of the souvenirs are made not to last so that people will have to keep buying them.
13	"Package Deal"	November 29, 1980
Big D sends the Drak Pack on a mission to Transylvania for a mysterious package that he has buried near his castle.
14	"The Grimmest Book of Records"	December 6, 1980
Dr. Dred's objective is to set the world's record for criminal activity. After capturing the Drak Pack, he uses Frankie in a plot to steal a racehorse and returns the jockey to the race, replacing the horse with Frankie.
15	"International Graffiti"	December 13, 1980
Dr. Dred sets out to put his face everywhere, even on the statues of Easter Island.
16	"It's In the Bag, Dr. Dred"	December 20, 1980
Dr. Dred plans to find the lost city of Burbankium, where everything is made out of silver and currently buried under a desert. Toad unknowingly activates the powerful vacuum cleaner that Dr. Dred invented while cleaning his laboratory. When OGRE begins its plot, they find the Drak Pack testing their new Sand Buggy as Professor Diggs works to find Burbankium.

== Home media ==
Visual Entertainment released Drak Pack: The Complete Series on DVD in Region 1 (Canada only) on February 5, 2008. VEI (distributed by Millennium Entertainment) released the complete series on DVD in the U.S. on September 6, 2011.

DVD name	Ep #	Region 1 (Can.)	Region 1 (U.S.)
Drak Pack: The Complete Series	16	February 5, 2008	September 6, 2011
