= Zita Leeson Weinshienk =

American judge (1933–2022)

Senior Judge of the United States District Court for the District of Colorado
- In office April 3, 1998 – March 31, 2011

Judge of the United States District Court for the District of Colorado
- In office September 26, 1979 – April 3, 1998
- Appointed by: Jimmy Carter
- Preceded by: Seat established by 92 Stat. 1629
- Succeeded by: Robert E. Blackburn

Personal details
- Born: April 3, 1933 St. Paul, Minnesota, U.S.
- Died: October 7, 2022 (aged 89) Nevada City, California, U.S.
- Education: University of Arizona (BA); Harvard Law School (JD)

Zita Leeson Weinshienk (April 3, 1933 – October 7, 2022) was an American lawyer who served as a United States district judge of the United States District Court for the District of Colorado from 1979 to 2011. She was inducted into the Colorado Women's Hall of Fame in 2000.

== Education and career ==
Born on April 3, 1933, in St. Paul, Minnesota, Weinshienk received a Bachelor of Arts degree from the University of Arizona in 1955 and a Juris Doctor from Harvard Law School in 1958. She was a probation counselor, legal advisor and referee of the Denver Juvenile Court from 1959 to 1964; a judge of the Denver Municipal Court from 1964 to 1965; and a judge of the Denver County Court from 1965 to 1971. In 1969 she presided over the first trial to be filmed in the United States in its entirety. The result was aired nationally on public television in March 1970. She was a judge of the Colorado District Court for the Second Judicial District from 1972 to 1979.

== Federal judicial service ==
On June 1, 1979, President Jimmy Carter nominated Weinshienk to a new seat on the United States District Court for the District of Colorado created by 92 Stat. 1629. She was confirmed by the United States Senate on September 25, 1979, and received her commission the following day. She assumed senior status on April 3, 1998, and retired from service on March 31, 2011.

== Personal life and death ==
Weinshienk died in Nevada City, California, on October 7, 2022, at the age of 89.

== Sources ==
Legal offices
Preceded by Seat established by 92 Stat. 1629	Judge of the United States District Court for the District of Colorado; 1979–1998	Succeeded by Robert E. Blackburn
