= Sir Philip Booth, 2nd Baronet =

British TV director and producer

Sir Philip Booth Bt
- Born: 8 February 1907
- Died: 5 January 1960
- Spouses: Stella Fenton Wood Gerr; Ethel Greenfield
- Parent(s): Sir Alfred Allen Booth, 1st Bt; Mary Blake Dwight

Sir Philip Booth, 2nd Baronet (8 February 1907 – 5 January 1960) was a British television director and producer who emigrated to California.

== Biography ==
=== Early life ===
Born on 8 February 1907, the son of Sir Alfred Allen Booth, 1st Baronet, by his wife, Mary Blake Dwight, he attended Malvern College before going up to King's College, Cambridge where he graduated with a Bachelor of Arts degree. He pursued postgraduate studies at Yale University in New Haven, Connecticut, before serving as a captain in the British Army during World War II. Upon his father's death in 1948, he succeeded to the family baronetcy.

=== Career ===
Booth worked in television as a director and producer. He served as Senior Director and Program Director of KTLA, a television station in Los Angeles, California, and also directed animated film series for television.

=== Personal life ===
On 22 August 1935 Booth married Stella Fenton Wood Gerr, whom he divorced in 1946. He married secondly, on 20 November 1948, Ethel Greenfield (March 21, 1914 - February 9, 2018) by whom he had two sons, Sir Doug Booth (born 2 December 1949) and Dr Derek Booth (born 7 April 1953). Sir Philip died on 5 January 1960, being survived by his 2nd wife.

Baronetage of the United Kingdom
| Preceded by Sir Alfred Booth | Baronet (of Allerton Beeches); 1948–1960 | Succeeded by Sir Douglas Booth |
