= SS Clement =

British turbine steamship

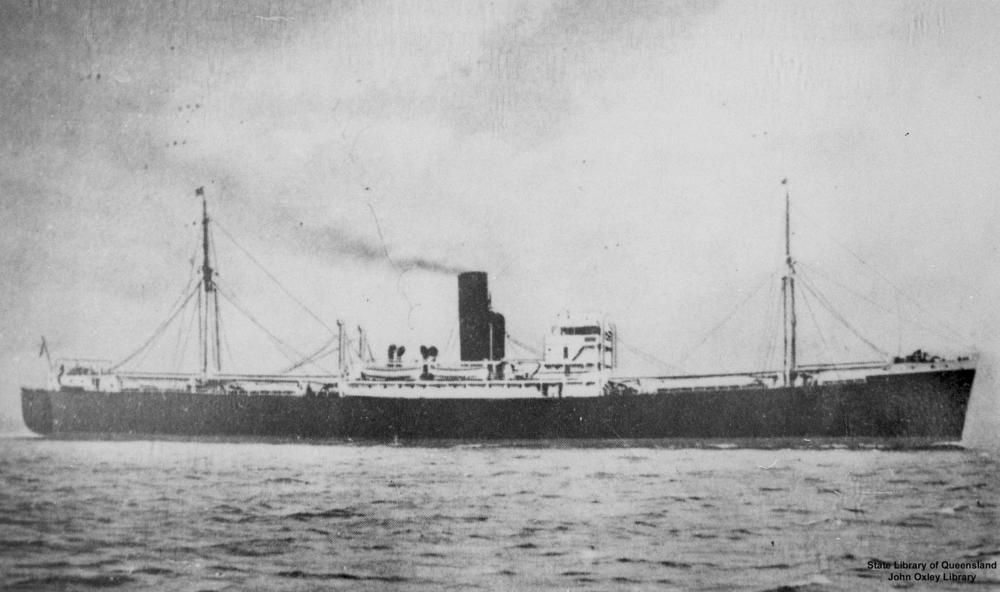
- SS Clement

History

United Kingdom
- Name: Clement
- Namesake: Clement of Alexandria
- Owner: Booth Steamship Co
- Operator: Booth Steamship Co
- Port of registry: Liverpool
- Route: Liverpool – Brazil
- Ordered: 1934
- Builder: Cammell, Laird, Birkenhead
- Yard number: 1000
- Launched: 11 October 1934
- Completed: December 1934
- Identification: UK official number 162414; call sign MBBL
- Fate: Sunk by shellfire: 30 September 1939

General characteristics
- Type: cargo liner
- Tonnage: 5,051 GRT, 3,082 NRT
- Length: 412.2 ft (125.6 m)
- Beam: 55.7 ft (17.0 m)
- Draught: 25 ft 7 1/2 in (7.81 m)
- Depth: 26.0 ft (7.9 m)
- Installed power: 653 NHP
- Propulsion: One triple-expansion engine; low-pressure steam turbine; driving a single screw
- Speed: 13 knots (24 km/h)
- Crew: 50
- Sensors & processing systems: wireless direction finding
- Notes: sister ship: Crispin

SS Clement was a British turbine steamship operated by the Alfred Booth and Company from 1934 to 1939 until she was intercepted and sunk by the German pocket battleship Admiral Graf Spee off the east coast of Brazil becoming the first victim of Graf Spee's commerce raiding sortie.

== Construction ==
A significant consequence of the Great Depression was a global slump in merchant shipping. Booth Line responded by renewing its fleet, selling 11 older ships and replacing them with a smaller number of new ones. Part of this strategy resulted in the Line ordering two cargo ships from the Birkenhead yards of Cammell Laird in 1934. Clement was launched on 11 October 1934 and completed that December. Her sister ship Crispin was launched on 7 December 1934 and completed in March 1935.

The Clement was the 1,000th vessel launched by Cammel Laird's at Birkenhead.

Clement's main engine was a three-cylinder triple-expansion steam engine which drove a single propeller. Exhaust steam from its low-pressure cylinder powered a Bauer-Wach steam turbine, that powered the same propeller shaft via double-reduction gearing and a Föttinger fluid coupling. The combined power of her piston engine and turbine was rated at 653 NHP, and gave her a speed of 13 knots (24 km/h).Clement's crew complement was approximately 50 and she provided accommodation for 12 passengers.

Registered in the Port of Liverpool, Clement's UK official number was 162414 and her call sign was MBBL.

== Interception ==
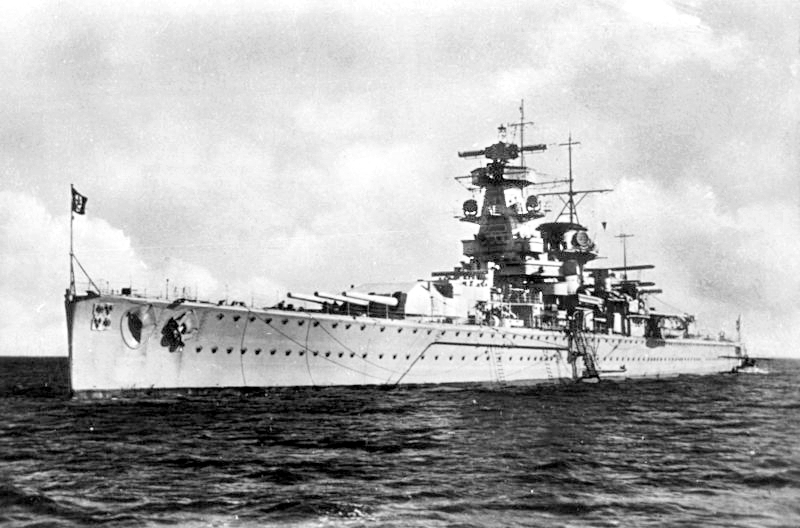
Admiral Graf Spee

At approximately 12:00 hrs on Saturday 30 September 1939, Admiral Graf Spee intercepted Clement 50 nautical miles southeast of Pernambuco. (Note: It was common practice in the 19th and 20th centuries for the names of the some relevant Brazilian states to be used in English and other foreign sources as the names of the principle port or city in those states. Thus Pernambuco=Recife, Bahia=Salvador.)

The Graf Spee transmitted to the Clement that under no circumstances should they operate the ship's radio. However the wireless operator ignored the instruction and proceeded to transmit an "RRR" signal ("I am under attack by a raider") as well as giving the position of the Clement in addition to which her Master, Captain Frederick Harris, ensured that important documentation was jettisoned over the side in accordance with British Admiralty orders.

As part of the interception Graf Spee had launched her Arado Ar 196 floatplane which proceeded to make several passes of the Clement, shooting at her upper works with its MG 15 machine gun during the course of which the Chief Officer of the Clement received a slight wound to one of his hands.

Admiral Graf Spee was under strict orders to comply with prize law. This required her to search any intercepted a ship for contraband and to ensure the safety of the captured ship's crew. If her commander decided to sink a captured ship, he would also have to ensure its crew was safely evacuated prior to any action.

Captain Langsdorff sent a boarding party to Clement. The party took Captain Harris and his Chief Engineer, Walter Bryant, prisoner and transferred them to Admiral Graf Spee. The remaining 47 members of Clement's crew abandoned ship in her four lifeboats, and the officer commanding the German boarding party gave them a course to steer to the Brazilian port of Maceió.

Graf Spee then sent a general wireless broadcast: "Please save lifeboats of Clement at 09° 04' South 34° 04' West." In an attempt to sow a ruse for the Allies, Admiral Graf Spee used the call sign of her sister ship Admiral Scheer.

One lifeboat containing sixteen crew members of the Clement was picked up by the Brazilian steamer Itatinga at a position between Pernambuco and Alagoas. The crew members were initially landed at Maceió. However they later re-embarked and were taken to Bahia. A second lifeboat successfully reached Maceió whilst other crew members were picked up by a cargo ship of the Lloyd Brasileiro company.

== Sinking ==
Approximate location of Clement's sinking

Following the evacuation of the Clement, Graf Spee proceeded to sink the vessel. However this proved to be a more difficult task than was initially envisaged. The boarding party set scuttling charges aboard Clement and opened her seacocks, but this failed to achieve the desired result. Two torpedoes were launched, but failed to find their target. Following this Graf Spee opened fire on the Clement from a distance of approximately 300 yards using some of her secondary armament of 15 cm (5.9 in) SK C/28 guns during the course of which she fired 25 rounds. Finally Graf Spee resorted to using some of her main armament of 28 cm (11.0 in) SK C/28 guns and after having expended 11 rounds from her primary guns the Clement finally sank at 16:40hrs. Clement was the first Allied merchant vessel to be sunk by a German surface ship in World War II.

== Aftermath ==
Having despatched the majority of the crew of the Clement to Maceió, on the evening of 30 September Graf Spee subsequently stopped the Greek tramp steamer Papalemos. At the request of Capt. Langsdorff the Captain of the Papalemos agreed not to send any Wireless signals concerning the Clement until they were some 600 nautical miles east from where they were stopped, following which Capt. Harris and Chief Officer Jones were transferred to the merchantman which continued on its passage allowing Graf Spee to resume its sortie.

The Master of the Papalemos kept his promise until they reached Cape Verde on 9 October, and following their arrival in São Vicente Captain Harris and his Chief Officer were released.

== Official number and code letters ==
Official numbers are issued by individual flag states. They should not be confused with IMO ship identification numbers. Clement had the UK Official Number 125122 and used the Code Letters M B B L.

== See also ==
- Battle of the Atlantic

== Bibliography ==
- John, AH (1959). A Liverpool Merchant House. London: George Allen & Unwin Ltd.
- Miller, David (2013). Command Decisions: Langsdorff and the Battle of the River Plate. Barnsley: Pen and Sword Books. ISBN 978-1473821385.
