= William Allen Butler =

American lawyer and writer (1825–1902)

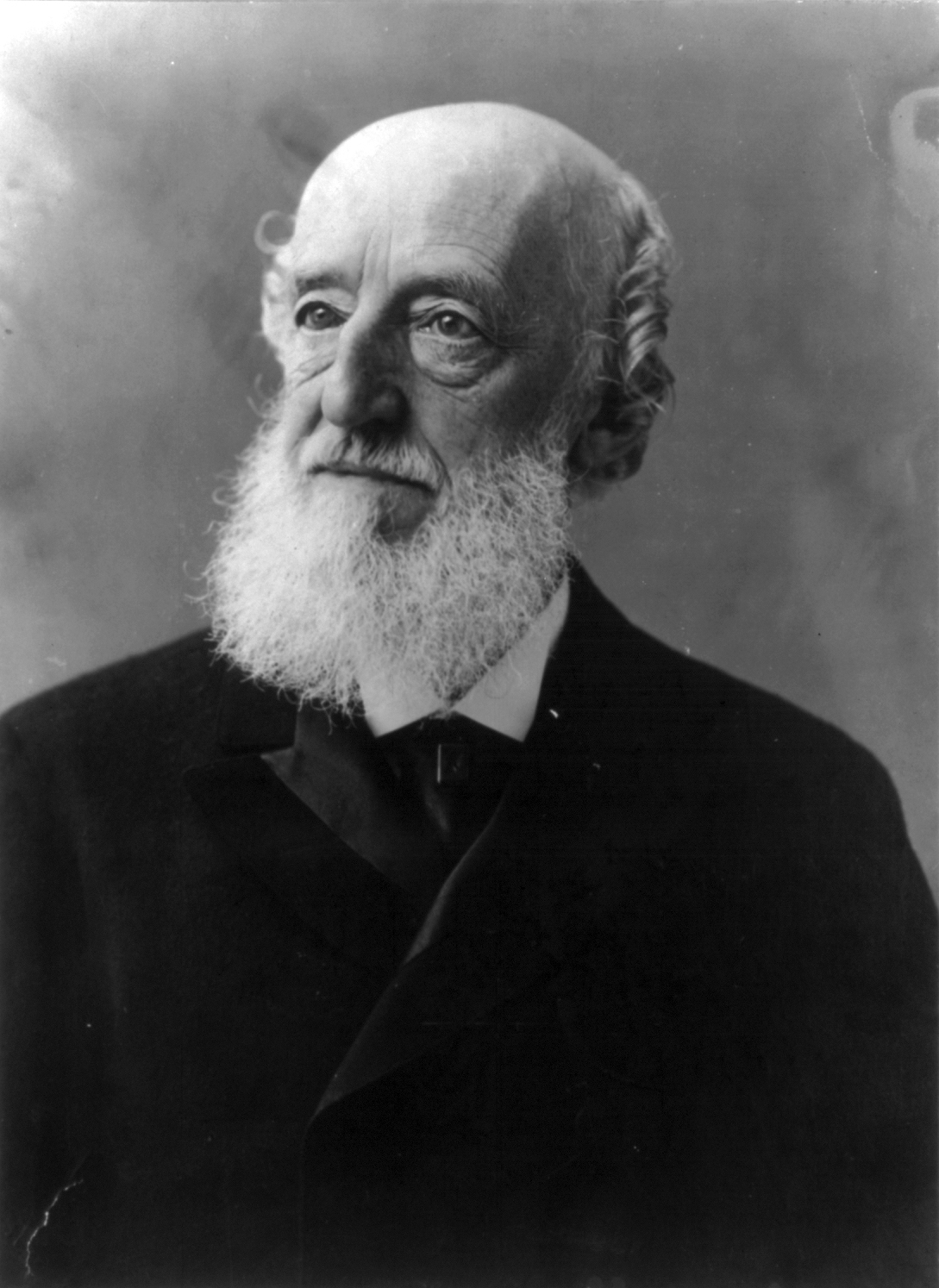
- Butler in 1902
- Born: February 20, 1825; Albany, New York, U.S.
- Died: September 9, 1902 (aged 77); Yonkers, New York, U.S.
- Education: University of the City of New York
- Occupations: Lawyer, poet
- Spouse: Mary R. Marshall (after 1850)
- Children: Howard Russell Butler, Harriet Allen Butler 10
- Parent(s): Benjamin Franklin Butler; Harriet Allen

William Allen Butler (February 20, 1825 – September 9, 1902) was an American lawyer and writer of poetical satires.

== Early life ==
Butler was born on February 20, 1825, in Albany, New York. He was the son of the poet and lawyer Benjamin Franklin Butler and his wife Harriet Allen and, via his mother, the nephew of naval hero William Howard Allen. Butler graduated from the University of the City of New York in 1843 and became a New York lawyer.

Benjamin Franklin Butler was a prominent figure in Butler's life, but also American history as he served as the Attorney General under President Martin Van Buren. His father had great prominence in his life and ultimately influenced him to pursue a career in law. Additionally his mother was a humanitarian and engaged in public service often. In combination, this created the attitude that formed William Allen Butler into the lawyer and scholar that he became.

Butler grew up around politics and literature that later developed into his career in government, justice and literature. This early start to his passions would later set him up to be successful, methodical and a complex legal scholar that impacted the legal system forever. His family was the biggest pivotal force that contributed to his career and passions later on in life, and he carried that with respect. Butler carried those values so deeply that he was dedicated to passing down those values to his own family lineage once he got married later on in life. William Allen Butler contributed those values in social commentaries later in his career that ultimately left a mark on materialistic society.

== Career ==
William Allen Butler attended the University of the City of New York, which today is known as NYU. Later on, Butler chose to pursue his strong passion for the legislative process. Butler's work was centered around making very complex legal systems more understandable and accessible to a wider audience and different social classes. In his work, Butler sought clarity and conveying his insight, which was conveyed through his various publications. His analytical insight contributed to shaping a modern and accessible approach to legal writing.

After being admitted to the bar, Butler practiced law and eventually headed the firm of Butler, Stillman & Hubbard. He served as president of the American Bar Association and the Association of the Bar of the City of New York.

He contributed travel writing and comic writing to The Literary World, a series on 'The Cities of Art and the Early Artists' to the Art Union Bulletin and also wrote for the Democratic Review. His most famous satirical poem, Nothing to Wear, was first published anonymously in Harper's Weekly in 1857 (see 1857 in poetry), though Butler was forced to reveal his name after someone else claimed authorship. In the work, Butler famously comments on the materialistic nature of society and how it is obsessed with outward status. It took over urban society as a witty commentary and spoke to the superficial needs of American society.

== Personal life ==
Family life played a true pivotal force in developing William Allen Butler's identity and professional life. Butler's priority in his home was developing his appreciation for learning and education. His intellectual curiosity was reflected in his family values. In the Virginia Libraries Archives his family records are stored along with the Kingsbridge Historical Society.

On March 21, 1850, he married Mary R. Marshall. Together, they were the parents of Howard Russell Butler, a painter and founder of the American Fine Arts Society, who was born in 1856. One of his daughters married John P. Crosby, another married Daniel B. Lord. His other children included Benjamin Franklin Butler Jr., Mrs. Edmund Dwight, Mrs. Thomas S. Kirkbride, and Mrs. Alfred Booth. Butler also wrote various poems, including “Nothing to Wear; an Episode of City Life,” which became an American classic.

Butler died at his residence, Round Oak, in Palisade Avenue in Yonkers, on September 9, 1902, due to sudden gastritis. Following a simple ceremony at his estate in Yonkers, a service was held at the First Presbyterian Church of Yonkers, and he was buried at Woodlawn Cemetery, Bronx.

== Legacy ==
William Allen Butler's legacy lies in both his literary and legal contributions to 19th-century American society. Best known for his satirical poems, Butler carved a unique landscape in America as a humorist who used poetry to critique social conventions, materialism, and moral shortcomings of the upper class. In addition to his literary works, Butler was a respected lawyer and served as President of the American Bar Association in 1887, and was instrumental in codifying and interpreting New York State statutes. His work in this area was very influential, as many of the texts and commentaries he helped produce are still referenced in New York legal practice today.

Though his literary works have lost popularity, Butler's contributions to American literature and law continue to be recognized by scholars. Butler remains a notable figure for his ability to combine sharp social observation with a deep commitment to public service and legal integrity.

== Selected works ==
Butler, in addition to being a lawyer, was also a poet and satirist, best known for his witty and socially critical writing style. A defining characteristic of Butler's work is his use of satire to critique social norms, particularly those concerning wealth, class, and gender. His writing is marked by clever wordplay, rhythmic precision, and a moral undertone, highlighting the hypocrisy of 19th-century American life. The following are some of Butler's most notable works:

- “Nothing to Wear” (1857)
  - This piece is widely known as Butler's most famous satirical poem, originally published in Harper’s Weekly. The poem follows the story of a wealthy, young woman claiming she has “nothing to wear,” despite her overflowing wardrobe. This poem criticizes consumerism, vanity, and the concerns of upper-class society.
- “Two Millions” (1858)
  - This piece serves as Butler's response to widespread financial scandals and speculation of the 1850s. This poem jokes about the obsession with wealth and asserts that capitalist ventures are unstable. This piece reflects Butler's interest in economic justice while highlighting his legal career.
- “A Retrospect of 40 Years” (1911)
  - This piece, written by Butler and later published by his daughter, Harriet Butler, after his death, is a memoir, social commentary, and satirical piece in which Butler looks back on the transformation of American society, culture, and law over forty years. As a lawyer, poet, and public intellectual, Butler draws on his personal experiences and professional insights to explore how the world around him has changed. In this memoir, Butler acknowledges progress in industry, transportation, and communication while also critiquing the loss of several values, customs, and personal dignity in the rush toward modernization.
