= HMS Hilary (1914) =

Cruiser of the Royal Navy

Coordinates: 60°33′N 4°00′W

History

United Kingdom
- Name: Hilary
- Namesake: Hilary of Poitiers
- Owner: Booth Steamship Co
- Operator: Booth Steamship Co 1908–1914; (United Kingdom) Royal Navy 1914–1917
- Port of registry: (United Kingdom) Liverpool
- Route: Liverpool – Brazil
- Builder: Caledon Shipbldg & Eng Co, Dundee
- Cost: £124,000
- Yard number: 200
- Launched: 31 March 1908
- Completed: August 1908
- Maiden voyage: 8 August 1908
- Identification: UK official number 127917; code letters HMTB; call sign MDP; Pennant number M 90 (1914–17)
- Fate: Torpedoed and sunk on 25 May 1917

General characteristics
- Type: 1907: ocean liner; 1914: armed merchant cruiser
- Tonnage: 6,326 GRT, 3,626 NRT
- Length: 418.5 ft (127.6 m)
- Beam: 52.2 ft (15.9 m)
- Depth: 35.3 ft (10.8 m)
- Installed power: 848 NHP
- Propulsion: 2 × triple-expansion engines; 2 × screws
- Speed: 14.5 knots (26.9 km/h; 16.7 mph)
- Capacity: passengers: 200 first class; 300 third class
- Armament: as armed merchant cruiser: 6 × 6-inch guns; 2 × 6-pounder guns
- Notes: sister ships: Lanfranc, Antony

HMS Hilary was a Booth Line passenger steamship that was built in Scotland in 1908 and operated scheduled services between Liverpool and Brazil until 1914. In the First World War she was an armed merchant cruiser (AMC) until a U-boat sank her in the Atlantic Ocean in 1917.

This was the second Booth ship to be called Hilary. The first was a cargo ship that was built in 1889 as Red Sea, bought by Booth and renamed Hilary in 1892, sold in 1911 to Japanese buyers and renamed Misumi Maru. The third was a passenger and cargo liner that was built in 1931, served as an ocean boarding vessel, landing ship, infantry and headquarters ship in the Second World War, returned to civilian service in 1946 and was scrapped in 1959.

== Building ==
Booth's operated scheduled cargo liner and passenger services between Europe and Brazil. In the first decade of the 20th century these services included regular sailings between Liverpool and Manaus, 1,000 miles (1,600 km) up the Amazon River. A Booth passenger ship would leave Liverpool for Manaus on or about the 10th, 20th and 30th day of each month.

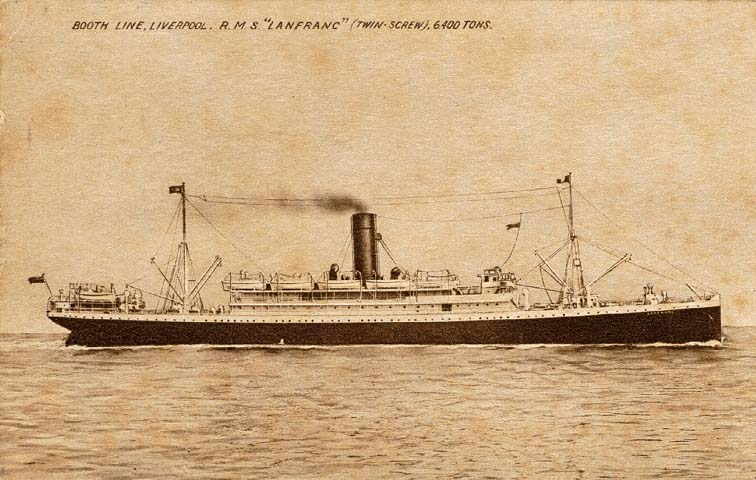
Hilary's sister ship Lanfranc

In 1907 and 1908 Booth took delivery of three new sister ships. Caledon Shipbuilding & Engineering Company of Dundee launched Lanfranc on 18 October 1906 and completed her in February 1907. R&W Hawthorn, Leslie and Company launched Antony on 11 November 1906 and completed her in February 1907.

Hilary the last of the three ships to be built. Caledon Shipbuilding and Engineering built her for £124,000. She was launched on 31 March 1908 and completed that August.

Hilary had twin screws. Each screw was driven by a three-cylinder triple-expansion engine. Between them the two engines were rated at 848 NHP and gave her a top speed of 14.5 knots (26.9 km/h; 16.7 mph).

Hilary had berths for 100 first class and 300 third class passengers. Her tonnages were 6,326 gross register tons (GRT) and 3,626 net register tons (NRT). She and her sisters were the largest ships in Booth's fleet until Scotts Shipbuilding and Engineering Company launched Hildebrand in 1911.

Hilary was registered in Liverpool. Her UK official number was 127917 and her code letters were HMTB.

By 1913 Hilary was equipped for wireless telegraphy, operated by the Marconi Company. Her call sign was MDP.

== First World War service and loss ==
By September 1914 the British Admiralty had requisitioned several Booth ships, including Hilary and her sisters. Hilary was converted into an AMC, armed with six 6-inch guns and two 6-pounder guns. She was commissioned into the Royal Navy at Liverpool on 6 December 1914 with the pennant number M 90.

Hilary served in the 10th Cruiser Squadron as part of the Allied Blockade of Germany. She patrolled between the British Isles and the Denmark Strait, often in the area between the Outer Hebrides and Faroe Islands and also to the Shetland Islands.

In the first half of 1917 Hilary patrolled west of the Outer Hebrides. That May she was making for Swarbacks Minn on Shetland for bunkering. On the morning of 25 May she was steaming at 12.5 knots (23.2 km/h; 14.4 mph) and making a zig-zag course. At 0710 hrs she reduced speed to 10 knots (19 km/h; 12 mph), to stream her paravanes, and then resumed to 12.5 knots.

At 0725 hrs Hilary was 40 nautical miles (74 km; 46 mi) west of Lerwick when SM U-88 torpedoed her, hitting her port side just forward of her boiler room. Within a minute water had risen enough to start extinguishing the fires in her furnaces. Hilary's commander, Captain FW Dean, gave the order to abandon ship.

The torpedo impact damaged Hilary's main aerial and knocked the crystal of her main wireless transmitter out of adjustment. Her wireless telegraph (W/T) operator tried to send a distress signal from her auxiliary radio, but its accumulators lacked enough charge to transmit. Part of her main aerial was still operable, and at 0745 hrs the W/T operator managed to send a distress message from the main transmitter.

At 0800 hrs Hilary started to launch her lifeboats. At 0805 hrs, as the number 3 Port lifeboat was alongside, U-88 hit Hilary with a second torpedo. The explosion threw the lifeboat in the air, killing four of her occupants and wounding another three. Other nearby lifeboats rescued survivors. The impact of the second torpedo completely disabled both of Hilary's wireless transmitters.

Hilary's aft guns fired at U-88's periscope, but failed to hit her. After 0830 hrs only three men remained aboard: Captain Dean, Lieutenant Commander Wray and an Assistant Steward called Edwards. Wray fired several rounds from a 6-pounder gun at U-88 but failed to hit her. Dean, Wray and Edwards then manned a 6-inch gun and tried to train it on U-88, but the torpedo impacts had damaged the gunsight and prevented them from getting a good aim at the submarine.

At 0840 hrs U-88 hit Hilary with a third torpedo, this time on her starboard side of her boiler room. At 0912 hrs Dean, Wray and Edwards swam to one of the lifeboats, and at 0915 Hilary sank.

Hilary had launched a number of Carley floats as well as her lifeboats. After the ship sank, men were redistributed between the boats to prevent overloading and the Carley floats were abandoned. The lifeboats headed for Shetland, using sails and oars.

Between 1500 and 1700 hrs the naval drifter Maggie Bruce rescued the occupants of six of the boats. Early the next morning the destroyer HMS Sarpedon rescued the occupants of the seventh and last boat.

== Sea serpent ==
In 1930 Nature published an article that claimed Captain Dean and several of his officers sighted a sea serpent about 70 nautical miles (130 km) southeast of Iceland on 22 May 1917, three days before U-88 torpedoed Hilary. The creature was described as black and smooth, with a snake-like neck and no protrusions except a dorsal fin about 4 ft (1.2 m) high. Different members of Hilary's crew estimated the creature's length to be 15 ft (4.6 m), 20 ft (6.1 m) or 28 ft (8.5 m).

Hilary got within about 1,200 yd (1,100 m) range of the creature and then opened fire with her 6-pounder guns. One round appeared to hit the creature, which then disappeared.

When Hilary was sunk her logbook for April and May 1917 was lost, and with it the only original record of the encounter with the sea creature.

== Bibliography ==
- Gray, Randal, ed. (1985). Conway's All the World's Fighting Ships 1906–1921. London: Conway Maritime Press. ISBN 0-85177-245-5.
- John, AH (1959). A Liverpool Merchant House. London: George Allen & Unwin Ltd.
- The Marconi Press Agency Ltd (1913). The Year Book of Wireless Telegraphy and Telephony. London: The St Katherine Press.
- Osborne, Richard; Spong, Harry & Grover, Tom (2007). Armed Merchant Cruisers 1878–1945. Windsor: World Warship Society. ISBN 978-0-9543310-8-5.
