= School for Vampires =

- Also known as: School for Little Vampires
- Genre: Horror comedy Dark fantasy Black comedy
- Created by: Gerhard Hahn; Antony Power
- Based on: Die Schule der kleinen Vampire by Jackie Niebisch
- Opening theme: Die Schule Der Kleinen
- Composers: Angelo Poggi; Giovanni Cera
- Countries of origin: Italy; Germany
- Original languages: Italian; German; English
- No. of seasons: 4
- No. of episodes: 104

Production
- Executive producers: Gerhard Hahn; Gioluca Bellomo
- Running time: 12 minutes
- Production companies: Rai Fiction; Cartoon-One; Hahn Film

Original release
- Network: KI.KA; ARD
- Release: August 26, 2006 – November 3, 2010

School for Vampires (German: Die Schule der kleinen Vampire, Italian: Scuola di vampiri) is a 2006 horror-comedy animated television series, based on the children's book Die Schule der kleinen Vampire by Jackie Niebisch in 1983.

The show originally ran from 2006 to 2010. An English-dubbed version was available on Netflix as School for Little Vampires from April 2016 until 2018. The series received praise for its art style and characters and has since then achieved cult status. In 2010, a feature film based on the series was planned, however as of 2021 no updates have been released.

== Premise ==
The series follows Oskar von Horrificus, a young vampire who faints at the sight of blood and is in love with a human girl named Sunshine who is the granddaughter of a local vampire hunter. He attends the School for Vampires which is run by his uncle, Count von Horifficus and goes on many nighttime adventures in a nearby city alongside other young vampires who attend the school.

== Characters ==
- Oskar von Horrificus: Oskar is the main protagonist of the series, He is often seen as the hero and is one of the students at the school. Count von Horrificus is Oskar's uncle. Oskar tries to be a great student, but unfortunately he has a fear of blood and is therefore a vegetarian. He is still able to change into a vampire bat like his friends and often visits a human girl named Sunshine because he has a crush on her and she feels the same. However, Sunshine doesn't know he's a vampire, as she is a sceptic. Some fans of the series have compared Oskar's appearance to 2-D from the virtual band Gorillaz, Victor Van Dort from Tim Burton's Corpse Bride and the lead singer of My Chemical Romance, Gerard Way. Oskar's name is a reference to the character, Oskar Eriksson from the 2004 vampire novel Let the Right One In.
- Gothetta Gothetticus: (originally named Gruftine) Gothetta is the only girl vampire in the school and the most level-headed out of all the kids. She is a skilled botanist. Gothetta gets into trouble herself at times, but isn't as bad as Stoker. She seems to have feelings for Oskar and doesn't particularly like Sunshine. Gothetta is also as smart as Leechy (only not as nerdy) and is often seen as a big sister figure to Klot. She has long curly red hair in a ponytail with the sides of her head shaved (also known as a wolftail). One episode shows her as a human. In the English dub, she speaks with somewhat of a "Valley Girl" accent. Fans often pair her with Creepy Suzie from The Oblongs and Phantasma from Scooby-Doo and the Ghoul School.
- Sunshine Polidori: A human girl whom Oskar is best friends with and has a crush on. Sunshine is a skeptic and is unaware that Oskar is a vampire. When she was turned into a vampire, she had black hair and was called Moonbeam. Her last name comes from John William Polidori, who is said to have created the vampire fiction genre. Sunshine also has feelings for Oskar but she keeps it a secret from him.
- Stoker Grimtale Cryptcrawler II: Stoker is rather an anti-hero and a troublemaker at the school. He is often getting himself or his friends into trouble and suffers from the most bad luck of anyone else in the series. His name is obviously a reference to Bram Stoker, the author of the popular novel Dracula. Stoker is the most stereotypical-looking vampire of his friends, since he resembles Count Dracula and loves blood. He has a one-sided crush on Gothetta. In the English dub, he speaks with a Cockney accent.
- Leechy von Lebanlos: (originally named Tinto) Leechy is a child prodigy who is very intelligent and often makes inventions for his friends. He is seen to be very close with Oskar, and had a crush on Professor Oxford's young niece, Ravena. He dresses and acts like a stereotypical nerd and has sharper fangs than the other students.
- Klot Tratzum: Klot is the youngest vampire of the group. He is best friends with Ashley and is often seen carrying him around in a bassinet for his dolls. Klot also believes in the Fang Fairy. A sailor suit that Klot wears is the reference from HBO animated special A Child's Garden of Verses (1992), prout and hat was used from Madeline.
- Ashley von Goulfangs: He was once a young vampire like the others, but was exposed to the sun, resulting in him being turned into a talking, sentient pile of dust. His name is a pun, since he is an ash pile. Ashley often speaks about his vampire life and that he was the best one in all the land where he comes from. Ashley also often tells everyone things they should know about others, like why Lenny was upset for a while. He is often a source of comic relief. As a vampire, he had red hair and wore dark navy blue clothes.
- Paulus Polidori: Sunshine's grandfather who is a vampire hunter. Even though he is not a skeptic like Sunshine, he is also unaware of the fact that Oskar is a vampire. He has a brother who is a skeptic, but even though Sunshine is also a skeptic, she demands that her grandfather be treated with respect. His brother eventually becomes a believer when Gothetta and Stoker change into bats and scare him. Paulus Polidori is often thought of as a "crackpot".
- Count Alarich von Horrificus: Oskar's uncle who works as the headmaster of the vampire school, He is always striving to make Oskar the best vampire he can be. His appearance resembles Gary Oldman in the 1992 film Dracula.
- Professor Oxblood: A vampire teacher and the uncle of Ravena. He looks similar to Count Orlok from the 1922 silent film Nosferatu.
- Lenny: (originally named: Nestor) The school's custodian. He is very protective of the students, especially when Sunshine's grandfather tries to kill them. Unlike the others, he was bitten by a vampire, not born as one. He speaks with a British accent and resembles Riff Raff from The Rocky Horror Picture Show.

== Minor characters ==
- Buck: a mischievous vampire boy who attempts to kill Sunshine and Polidori but is later foiled by Oskar. Buck has been considered a fan favourite amongst fans of the series despite only appearing in one episode.
- Lady Kryptina: a female vampire teacher at the school. She resembles Lucy Westenra as seen in the 1992 Dracula.
- Princess Nerfativi: An Egyptian vampire princess who resembles Cleopatra. She only appeared in one episode and is a spoiled brat.
- Count Fracula: An elderly and delusional vampire who is a parody of Count Dracula.
- Ravena Oxblood: A female vampire whom Leechy has a crush on. She is related to Professor Oxford and is also interested in inventing things. She has black hair in a bun and somewhat resembles Mina Harker from the Dracula franchise by the way she dresses.
- Batoria: Gothetta's cousin who looks like a stereotypical goth or scene girl. She's friends with Stoker. Her name is a parody of Countess Bathory.
- Dr. Ironfang: An inspector who comes to the school to examine the students' vampire skills. He was once crushed by a tombstone resulting him into becoming a dwarf and no one has the courage to tell him about how he really looks. Ironfang's design resembles The Man in the Beaver Hat from the lost silent horror film London After Midnight.

== Cast ==
Clayton Nemrow as Oskar (Season 1 only), Count von Horrificus, Polidori, Lenny

Marianne Graffam as Gothetta, Klott

Harvey Friedman as ?

Shaun Lawton as ?

Christa Lewis as Kryptina

Marty Sander as ?

Jeff Burrell as ?

Manon Kahle as ?

Albert Calvert as ?

Heather De Lisle as ?

Jonathan Failla as ?

Tomas Spencer as ?

Saudia Young as Oskar (Seasons 2 and 3 only)

Priscilla Bergey as ?

== Potential animated feature film ==
The German Media (MDM) supported the project development of the movie SCHOOL FOR VAMPIRES by promoting a 3D produced by RABBIX VFX GmbH Weimar and Hahn Film AG, as Gerhard Hahn will be director and producer. The production should begin in 2010. However, as of June 2021, no updates have been released. As stated on the Hahn Film website, the film would have followed Oskar trying to pursue a career in singing by starring in a musical while also trying to pursue his love for Sunshine. The potential film adaptation of the series would have had a runtime of 80 minutes and it would have also been a fully computer animated feature.

The film adaptation of the already published in 5 countries book series by Jackie Niebisch is co-produced by the ARD, CARTOON ONE and the DZT and the first 78 episodes were broadcast by ARD and KIKA with high odds. An animated television series was developed, producing several seasons. The first 26 individual new episodes were completed under the direction of Tony Power and aired from March 2010. The international pre-sales of the series support the sale of the movie, which is planned for 2010.

The animated series had one significant difference, depending on the voice dubbing and location of its broadcast. The German dub had different names for four of the main characters.

== See also ==
- List of German television series
- List of Italian television series
- List of vampire television series
