= The Art of Cross-Examination =

1903 book by Francis L. Wellman

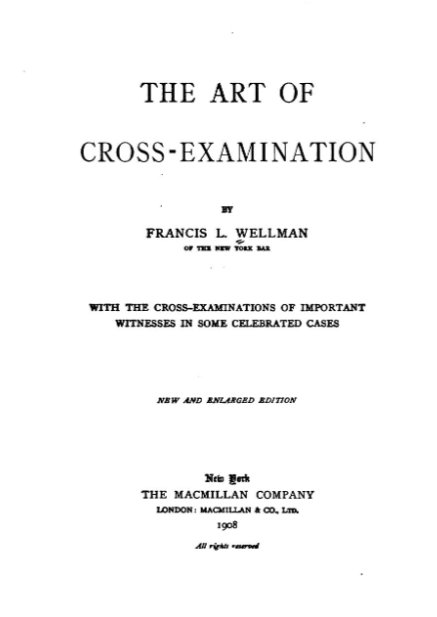
- Title page for The Art of Cross-Examination (1908)
- Author: Francis L. Wellman
- Language: English
- Genre: Non-fiction
- Publisher: The Macmillan Company
- Publication date: 1903
- Publication place: United States
- Text: The Art of Cross-Examination at Wikisource

The Art of Cross-Examination is a classic text for trial attorneys and law students on how to cross-examine witnesses. Written by American attorney Francis L. Wellman, the book was first published in 1903 by The Macmillan Company, and was still in print more than 100 years later.

== Author ==
Francis L. Wellman was a practicing attorney in New York State as well as an assistant district attorney in New York City. He dedicated the book to his two sons, hoping to encourage them to enter the legal profession.

Wellmann compiled many examples of cross-examination techniques from colleagues and notable attorneys on celebrated cases. Notable references include such legal giants as Abraham Lincoln "in his twenty-three years" of trial practice prior to his political career (chapter IV), then-Judge Benjamin Cardozo (later a ground-breaking U.S. Supreme Court justice), U.S. Attorney General Benjamin Butler, the Vanderbilt family, and others. Well-known trial attorneys and their cross examination techniques are highlighted and interwoven with the stories of the day along with the prominent members of the legal profession, from New York City and also England.

The book gives colorful, interesting facts on the trial participants; provides insights into various claims, disputes, marriage scandals; etc. The New York Times contrasted it with other, boring legal texts, and recommended it to both trial lawyers and non-lawyers for its entertainment value. It is filled with suspense regarding the outcomes of the compelling trials within the book. Equally suspenseful are the legal outcomes from the attempts of the attorneys to sway the juries with their erudition, wit, and charm.

== Cross-Examination Topics ==
Some of the key topics covered include the following:

- Cross-Examination of the Perjured Witness—chapter IV
- Cross-Examination of Experts—chapter V
- Silent Cross-Examination—chapter VII
- Methods of Famous Cross-Examiners—chapter XIII
- Dangers That Confront a Cross-Examiner—chapter XI
- Fallacies of Testimony—chapter VIII

In chapter VIII, Wellman reflects on the inconsistencies of statements during trials and also the basis for developing strong cross examination skills to uncover truths. He states:

- "No one can frequent our courts of justice for any length of time without finding himself aghast at the daily spectacle presented by seemingly honest and intelligent men and women who array themselves upon opposite sides of a case and testify under oath to what appear to be absolutely contradictory statements of fact. It will be my endeavor in what follows to deal with this subject from its psychological point of few and to trace some of the causes of these unconscious mistakes of witnesses, so far as it is possible. The inquiry is most germane to what has preceded, for unless the advocate comprehends something of the sources of the fallacies of testimony, it surely would become a hopeless task for him to try to illuminate them by his cross-examinations."
- "It has been aptly said that 'Knowledge is only the impression of one's mind and not the fact itself, which may present itself to many minds in many different aspects.'"
- "The unconscious sense impressions - sight, sound or touch - would be the same to every human mind; but once you awaken the mind to consciousness, then the original impression takes on all the color of motive, past experience, and character of the individual mind that receives it. The sensation by itself will always be the same. The variance arises when the sensation is interpreted by the individual and becomes a perception of his own mind."

The author thus indicates the challenging questions that should be put to a witness, questioning not merely their statement of facts, but motives, perceptions, misimpressions etc.

== Trials ==
Some of the trials with cross-examination highlights in the book include the following:

The cross-examination of Mrs. Reginald Vanderbilt by Herbert C. Smyth in the trial of Vanderbilt vs. Mrs. Harry Payne Whitney- to recover child custody.

Leonard Kip Rhinelander vs. Alice Jones Fhinelander - for annulment action against his wife spurred by racial prejudice.

Marie S. Livingston vs. Cecil Barret of Spencer Trask & Co. Cross examination by Lloyd Paul Stryker of the Barrets for nondisclosure that Ms. Livingston, a widow with five children, placed her stock in the hands of a broker she met at a social gathering. She was unwittingly allowing the firm to sell her stocks and then invest in a company owned by the firm. Though no damages were found, the plaintiff prevailed in having transactions reversed. There followed Wendt v. Fischer, 243 N. Y. 439, p. 443, where Judge Benjamin Cardozo is quoted as stating, "If dual interests are to be served, the disclosure to be effective must lay bare the truth, without any ambiguity or reservation, in all its stark significance."

The cross-examination of Ada and Phoebe Brush by George W. Whiteside - in their suit against two prominent Huntington, Long Island physicians, to recover damages for their ten-year incarceration in Kings Park State Hospital as insane patients.

The cross-examination of Miss Martinez by the Hon. Joseph H. Choate for the defense, in the breach of promise case Martinez v. Del Valle.

The cross-examination of Richard Pigott by Sir Charles Russell before the Parnell Commission.

The cross-examination by Henry W. Taft of Dr. Charles Dana, Dr. Frederick Peterson and Dr. Smith Ely Jelliffe, expert witnesses in the litigation over the will of Andrew F. Kennedy.

== Availability ==
Due to its age, the book's copyright is expired. It is currently published for free and still recommended reading for trial lawyers. Commercial sites and Google Books publish it in its entirety. It is also being sold online over a century later.
