= Derek Booth =

American geomorphologist and heir to the Booth baronetcy

Derek Blake Booth (born 7 April 1953), is an Anglo-American aristocratic academic and geologist. Booth is heir presumptive to the Booth baronetcy.

Booth coat of arms

== Education and career ==
Educated at Hampshire College, Amherst (B.A. in Literature, 1974), University of California, Berkeley (B.A. in Geology, 1978), Stanford University (M.S. in Geology, 1980) and the University of Washington (Ph.D. in Geological Sciences, 1984), Booth was Professor of Civil & Environmental Engineering and Earth & Space Sciences at the University of Washington, before joining Stillwater Sciences (Past President).

Booth, an affiliate professor of the University of Washington and an adjunct professor of the Bren School of Environmental Science & Management (UCSB), is senior editor of Quaternary Research.

== Family ==
Of Anglo-American aristocratic descent, Booth married Elizabeth Dreisbach on 28 June 1981, and has two children, including a son, Colin Booth (born 1982), heir-in-line to the baronetcy.

Dr Booth divorced in 2000, and married secondly, on 24 June 2006, Dr Stephanie Louise Moret with whom he lives in Santa Barbara, California.
