= MV Wotan =

1913 tanker

History
- Name: MV Wotan (1913–14); SMS A (1914–15); MV Wotan (1915–27); SS Gianna M (1927–41); SS Empire Control (1941–48); SS Kleinella (1948–53)
- Owner: Deutsche-Amerikanische Petroleum Gesellschaft (1913–14); Kaiserliche Marine (1914–15); Deutsche-Amerikanische Petroleum Gesellschaft (1915–19); The Reparation Commission (1919–27); Compagnia Italiana Trasporto Olii Minerali (1927–41); Ministry of War Transport (1941–48); Shell Company of Gibraltar Ltd (1948–53)
- Operator: Deutsche-Amerikanische Petroleum Gesellschaft (1913–14); Kaiserliche Marine (1914–15); Deutsche-Amerikanische Petroleum Gesellschaft (1915–19); Standard Oil Co (1919–20); Compagnia Italiana Trasporto Olii Minerali (1927–41); Eagle Oil & Shipping Co. Ltd. (1941); Davies & Newman Ltd (1941–45); Shell Company of Gibraltar Ltd (1948–53)
- Port of registry: (German Empire) Hamburg (1913–14); (German Empire) Kaiserliche Marine (1914–15); (German Empire) Hamburg (1915–18); United States (1918–27); (Italy) Genoa (1927–41); (United Kingdom) London (1941–53)
- Builder: Reiherstieg Schiffswerft & Maschinenfabrik
- Yard number: 447
- Launched: 1913
- Completed: August 1913
- Out of service: 1920-27; 1940-41; 1945-48
- Identification: Code Letters NRJL (1927–33); Code Letters IBAO (1933–41); Code Letters BPWC (1941–53); United Kingdom Official Number 149772 (1941–53)
- Fate: Scrapped

General characteristics
- Class & type: Tanker
- Tonnage: 5,703 GRT(1913–27); 5,719 GRT (1927–53); 3,449 NRT; 7,970 DWT
- Length: 406 ft 4 in (123.85 m)
- Beam: 52 ft 7 in (16.03 m)
- Depth: 26 ft 8 in (8.13 m)
- Installed power: Diesel engine (1913–27); Triple expansion steam engine (1927–53)
- Propulsion: Screw propeller

MV Wotan was a 5,703 GRT tanker that was built in 1913 by Reiherstieg Schiffswerft & Maschinenfabrik, Hamburg, Germany. Requisitioned by the Imperial German Navy in 1914, she served until 1915 as SMS A and was then returned to her owners. Ceded to the United States in 1919, she was operated until 1920 then laid up following an engine failure.

In 1927, she was sold to Italian owners. Her diesel engine was replaced by a triple expansion steam engine and she was renamed SS Gianna M. In 1941, she was captured by HMS Hilary, passed to the Ministry of War Transport (MoWT) and was renamed SS Empire Control. She was sold into merchant service in 1948 and renamed SS Kleinella, serving as a storage hulk at Gibraltar until 1953, when she was scrapped.

== Description ==
The ship was built in 1913 by Reiherstieg Schiffswerft und Maschinenfabrik, Hamburg, as yard number 447. Completion was in August 1913.

The ship was 405 feet 0 inches (123.44 m) long, with a beam of 52 feet 5 inches (15.98 m) and a depth of 26 feet 8 inches (8.13 m). As built, the ship was 5,703 GRT, 7,970 DWT.

Originally, the ship was propelled by diesel engine. In 1927, this was replaced by a triple expansion steam engine, which had cylinders of 26 9/16 inches (67.5 cm), 43 5/16 inches (110.0 cm) and 70 7/8 inches (180 cm) diameter by 47 1/4 inches (120 cm) stroke. This engine was built by Gutehoffnungshütte, Oberhausen, Germany.

== History ==
Wotan was built for the Deutsche-Amerikanische Petroleum Gesellschaft, Hamburg, one of the earliest motor vessels constructed. Selandia was the first, being completed in 1912. In August 1914, she was requisitioned by the Kaiserliche Marine for use as a depôt ship, named A. She was returned to her owners in June 1915. In June 1919, she was delivered to the United States as part of Germany's war reparitions. She was operated under the management of the Standard Oil Co. Wotan departed London on 22 December 1920 bound for New York, but suffered engine trouble on the voyage. She was then laid up at Baltimore, Maryland.

In 1927, Wotan was sold to the Compagnia Italiana Trasporto Olii Minerali, Genoa. She was fitted with a triple expansion steam engine and renamed Gianna M. The ship was now assessed at 5,719 GRT, 3,396 NRT. The code letters NRJL were allocated. In 1934, her code letters were changed to IBAO.

In June 1940, Gianna M was laid up at Las Palmas, Canary Islands. On 11 May 1941, Gianna M was captured by the Armed Merchant Cruiser HMS Hilary whilst attempting to reach Bordeaux, France. On 13 May, Hilary and Gianna M joined Convoy HG 61, which had departed Gibraltar on 6 May 1941 and arrived at Liverpool on 20 May. On 18 May, Gianna M was slightly damaged in an air raid on the convoy. Gianna M was escorted into Belfast. She was passed to the MoWT and renamed Empire Contract. Her port of registry was changed to London. The Code Letters BPWC and United Kingdom Official Number 149772 were allocated. Initially operated under the management of the Eagle Oil and Shipping Company Ltd, Belfast, management later passed to Davies & Newman Ltd.

In 1945, Empire Control was laid up at Falmouth, Cornwall. It was intended that she would be converted to a factory ship. In 1948, she was sold to the Shell Company of Gibraltar Ltd, London and renamed Kleinella. She was used as a storage hulk at Gibraltar. In 1953, she was sold for scrapping to Clayton & Davie Ltd, Dunston-on-Tyne, Northumberland, arriving on 14 July. Kleinella was scrapped in December 1953.
