= Booth baronets =

Set index for Booth baronets

There have been three baronetcies created for persons with the surname Booth: one in the Baronetage of England and two in the Baronetage of the United Kingdom.

The 1916 creation remains extant as of 2026, the 1835 creation became extinct in 1896, and the 1611 baronetcy has been dormant since 1797.

- Booth baronets of Dunham Massey (1611) – The senior line of this creation was elevated to the peerage as Baron Delamer and Earl of Warrington.
- Booth baronets of Portland Place (1835)
- Booth baronets of Allerton Beeches (1916)
