= Alfred Booth and Company =

British shipping line

- Industry: water transport
- Founded: Liverpool, United Kingdom, 1863
- Founder: Alfred Booth; Charles Booth
- Defunct: 1986
- Fate: divided and sold
- Headquarters: Liverpool, United Kingdom
- Area served: UK, USA, South America
- Key people: Alfred Allen Booth
- Services: leather, merchant shipping, tourism, civil engineering

Alfred Booth and Company was a British trading and shipping company, founded in 1866 and traded for more than a century. It was founded in Liverpool, England, by two brothers, Alfred and Charles Booth to export English light leather to the US. It grew into a significant merchant shipping company with its head office in Liverpool and interests in the United States and South America. The group was broken up in 1964 and the last Booth company from the group was sold in 1986.

== History ==
Alfred and Charles Booth were cousins of William James Lamport, co-founder of the Liverpool shipping company Lamport and Holt Line, and worked in the company's office. In 1851 Lamport transferred minority shareholdings in a cargo steamship, the Nile, to several associates including Charles Booth and George Holt. In 1854 Lamport, Holt, Booth and Holt's father, also called George Holt, all took minority shares in a new ship, the Orontes. At the time it was common for a merchant ship to be in 64 shares held by a number of owners. Charles Booth had two shares in the Nile and one in the Orontes.

In 1863 the Booth brothers founded a partnership, Alfred Booth and Company, to export English light leather to the US, which was in the midst of its civil war. The company had headquarters in Liverpool and a US office in New York City.

In February 1865 the Booth brothers ordered two new ships. Once again they were part-owners; relatives including Alfred Holt and his brother Philip held most of the remaining 64 shares in each ship. The ships were named Augustine and Jerome after St Augustine of Hippo and St Jerome, two of the great Doctors of the Church. It became a company tradition to name ships after notable bishops and other historic figures. The ships carried English leather, both tanned and untanned, to the USA. In 1866 Booths started a regular steamship service between Liverpool and ports in northern Brazil and on the Amazon River. In 1881 the shipping line became a limited company, Booth Steamship Co Ltd.

After John Boyd Dunlop patented the pneumatic tyre in 1888, the trade in natural rubber from Brazil increased, and by 1900 Booth's had 14 ships. Booths had competitors on the Brazilian route including the Red Cross Iquitos Steamship Co, which operated up the Amazon to Iquitos in Peru, and the Maranham Steamship Co. In 1901 Red Cross's founder, Robert Singlehurst, retired and his company merged with Booths to form the Booth Steamship Co (1901) Ltd.

Booths' fleet developed to include substantial passenger liners. In 1903 the company started carrying tourists to and from Lisbon and Madeira.

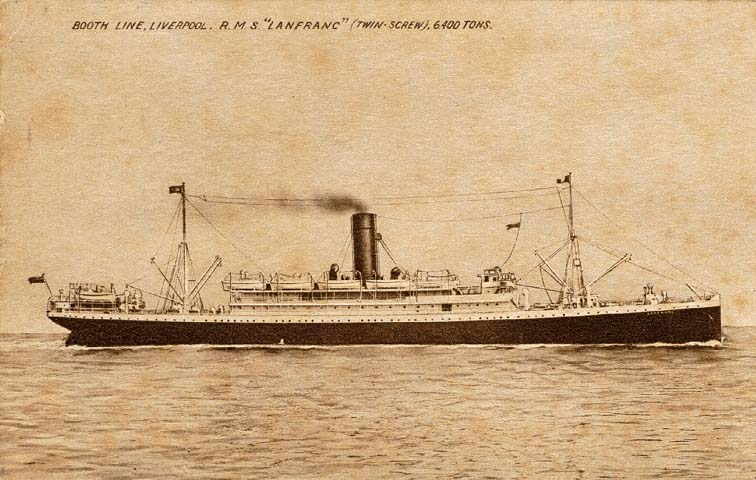
Lanfranc, launched in 1906, was a hospital ship from 1915 and sunk in 1917

In 1912 Charles Booth retired and passed the chairmanship to his nephew, Charles Booth (1868–1938). In 1915 Charles senior returned from retirement to help the company in the First World War, despite suffering from worsening heart disease. He died of a stroke on 23 November 1916. In 1914 the fleet had more than 30 ships. 11 were requisitioned for war service and enemy action sank nine including two ocean liners, the sister ships Antony and Lanfranc. By 1919 only 18 ships remained in the fleet.

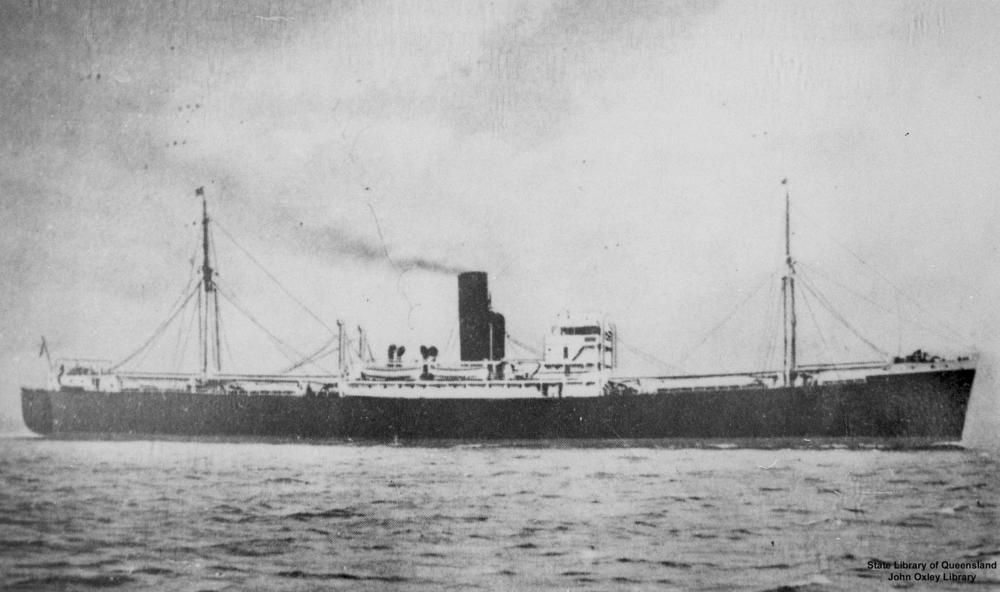
The cargo steamship Clement was launched in 1934 and sunk in 1939

Alfred Booth & Co diversified into civil engineering, and in 1919 it bought the Unit Construction Company from Crittall. Booths lost one ship in peacetime between the two World Wars, when the Gregory ran aground and was wrecked. The company introduced passenger cruises, advertising "1,000 miles up the Amazon"

Despite losing nine ships in the First World War, Booth did not buy any ships for the first nine years after the 1918 Armistice. In 1927 Booth bought a second-hand German ship that it renamed Dominic. Between 1928 and 1935 it renewed part of its fleet with seven new ships and one second-hand one, Dunstan.

Booth lost several ships in the Second World War. The cargo steamship Clement was launched in 1934 and sunk by the German cruiser Admiral Graf Spee in September 1939. The passenger liner Anselm, which was requisitioned as a troopship in 1940, was sunk by torpedo in July 1941 with the loss of 254 lives.

After the war the company again modernised with new ships, and from 1955 it diversified its naming policy with Spanish names as well as early church ones. In 1957 Booths again suffered a peacetime loss, when the liner Hildebrand ran aground.

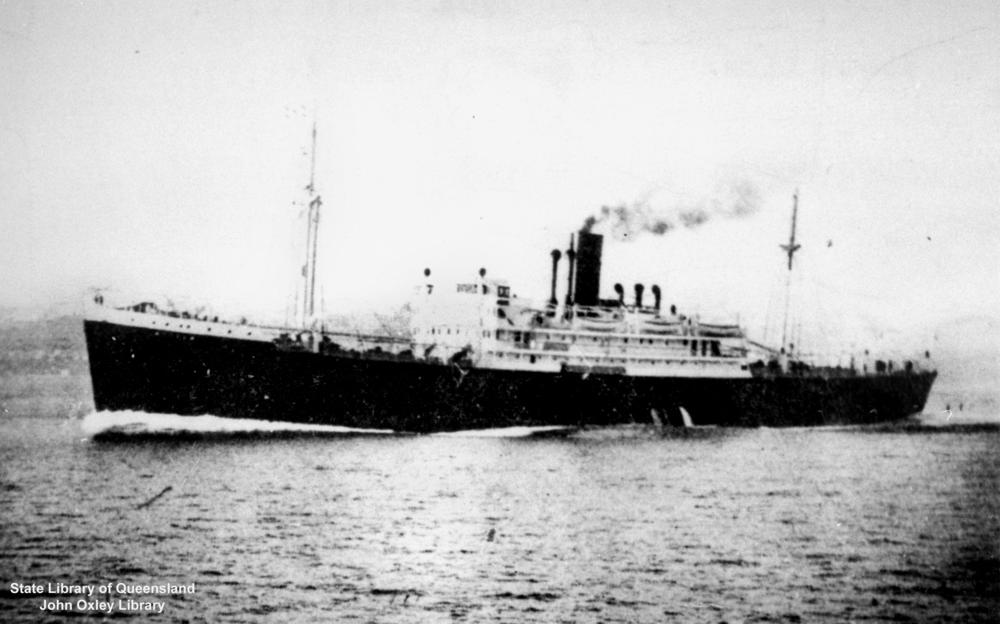
Anselm, launched in 1935, was a troopship from 1940 and sunk in 1941

In 1946 Alfred Booth & Co sold Booth Steamship Co business to the Vestey group of companies,. Vestey already had its own shipping subsidiary, Blue Star Line, founded in 1911. Under Vestey's in 1955 Booth Steamship Co started trading in the Caribbean with a service between Brazil and Canada via the West Indies. Through the 1940s, 50s and 60s Vestey's transferred numerous ships between Booth's, Lamport & Holt and Blue Star. Each company had a different naming tradition, so ship transfers generally involved a change of name to accord with the house style of each company. In 1975 Vestey's absorbed the two fleets into Blue Star Line.

In 1964 after a Booth family split the leather business was separated as Booth and Company (International) Ltd. It was made a public company in 1974 and bought by Garnar-Scotblair in 1981. In that period the managing director was John Sebastian Macaulay Booth, a grandson of co-founder Charles Booth.

Alfred Booth & Co was sold in 1986 to the construction company Mowlem.; the chairman at the time of its sale was Richard Amis CBE, a grandson of Alfred Allen Booth.

== Booth baronets ==
Alfred Allen Booth was a director of Cunard Steamship Co, was made a baronet in 1916 and died in 1948. The baronetcy passed to his eldest son, the television director and producer Sir Philip Booth, 2nd Baronet. He died in 1960 and was succeeded by his son Sir Douglas Allen Booth, 3rd Baronet, a television producer and writer living in New York City. His heir presumptive is Derek Booth, a hydrogeologist.

== Sources and further reading ==
- Heaton, P.M. (1977). "Lamport and Holt Line". Sea Breezes.
- Hyde, Francis E (1960). "(review of A Liverpool Merchant House)". The Economic History Review. New Series, 12 (3): 474–475. doi:10.2307/2590898. ISSN 0013-0117. JSTOR 2590898.
- John, A.H. (2005) [1959]. A Liverpool Merchant House: Being the History of Alfred Booth and Company 1863–1958. London: Routledge. ISBN 978-0415381598.
- Read, Gordon; Garner, Ken; Govier, David, eds. (2006). Booth Steamship Company. Liverpool: National Museums Liverpool.
- Slader, John (1988). The Red Duster at War. London: William Kimber & Co Ltd. ISBN 978-0-7183-0679-3.
