= Sturm College of Law =

Law school of University of Denver in Colorado, US

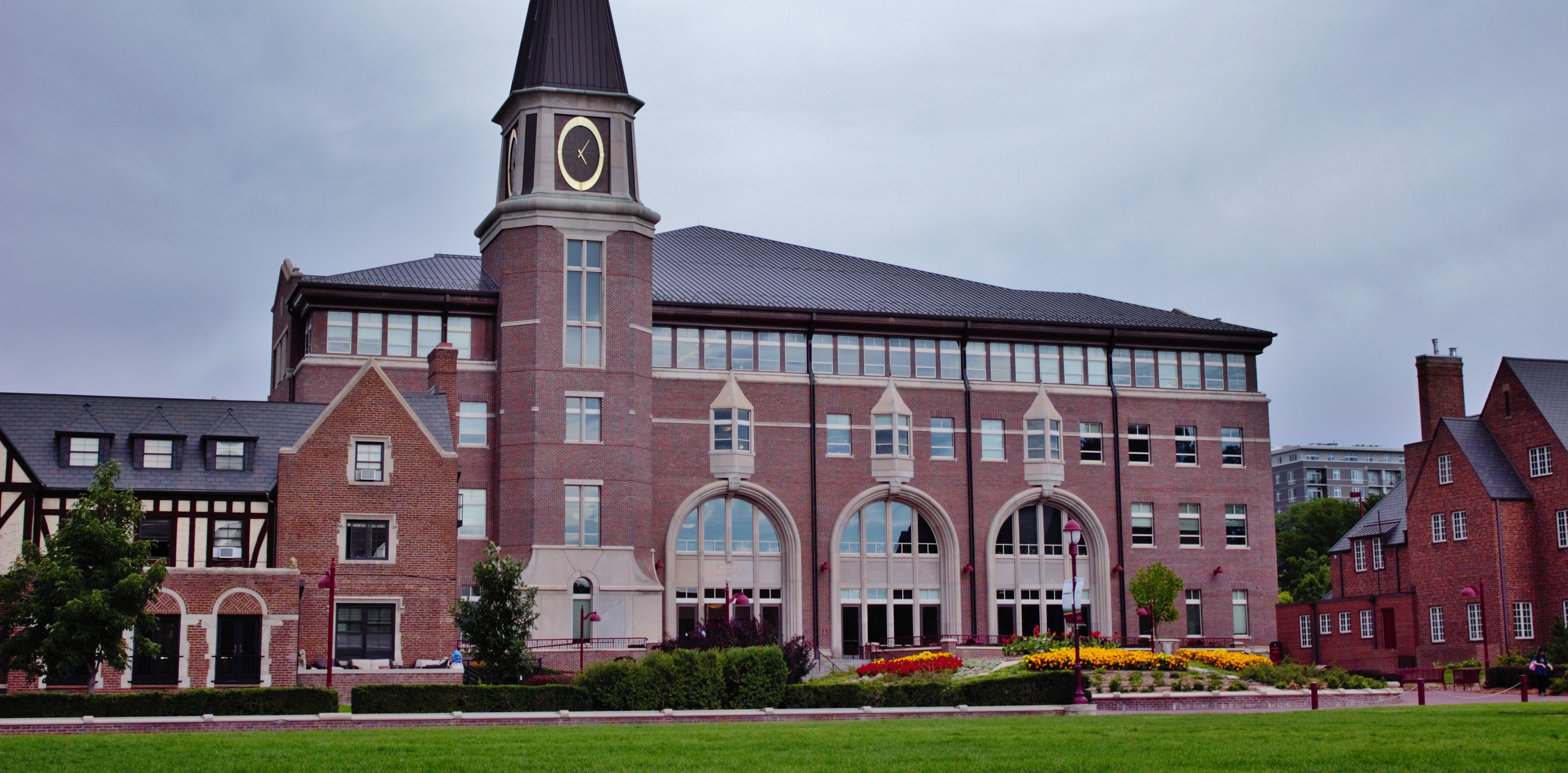
- Parent school: University of Denver
- Established: 1892
- School type: Private
- Parent endowment: $620.24 million
- Dean: Bruce Smith
- Location: Denver, Colorado, United States; 39°40′45″N 104°57′40″W
- Enrollment: 735 full-time 138 part-time
- Faculty: 155
- USNWR ranking: 88th (tie) (2025)
- Bar pass rate: 83.54%
- Website: www.law.du.edu

The Sturm College of Law ("Denver Law") is the professional graduate law school of the University of Denver. Along with the University of Colorado Law School, it is one of two law schools in the state of Colorado. Founded in 1892, the Sturm College of Law was one of the first in America's Mountain West. The college is located on the University of Denver's campus, about seven miles south of downtown Denver. According to Denver Law's 2017 ABA-required disclosures, 67.9% of the Class of 2017 obtained full-time, long-term, JD-required employment nine months after graduation, excluding solo practitioners.

== History ==
The University of Denver College of Law opened 1892. Westminster Law School, founded in 1912, merged with the University of Denver College of Law in 1957. It provided the only evening program west of Kansas City. One term of the merger required the development of an evening program at the College of Law. In addition, the law library was named the Westminster Law Library.

=== Sturm namesake ===
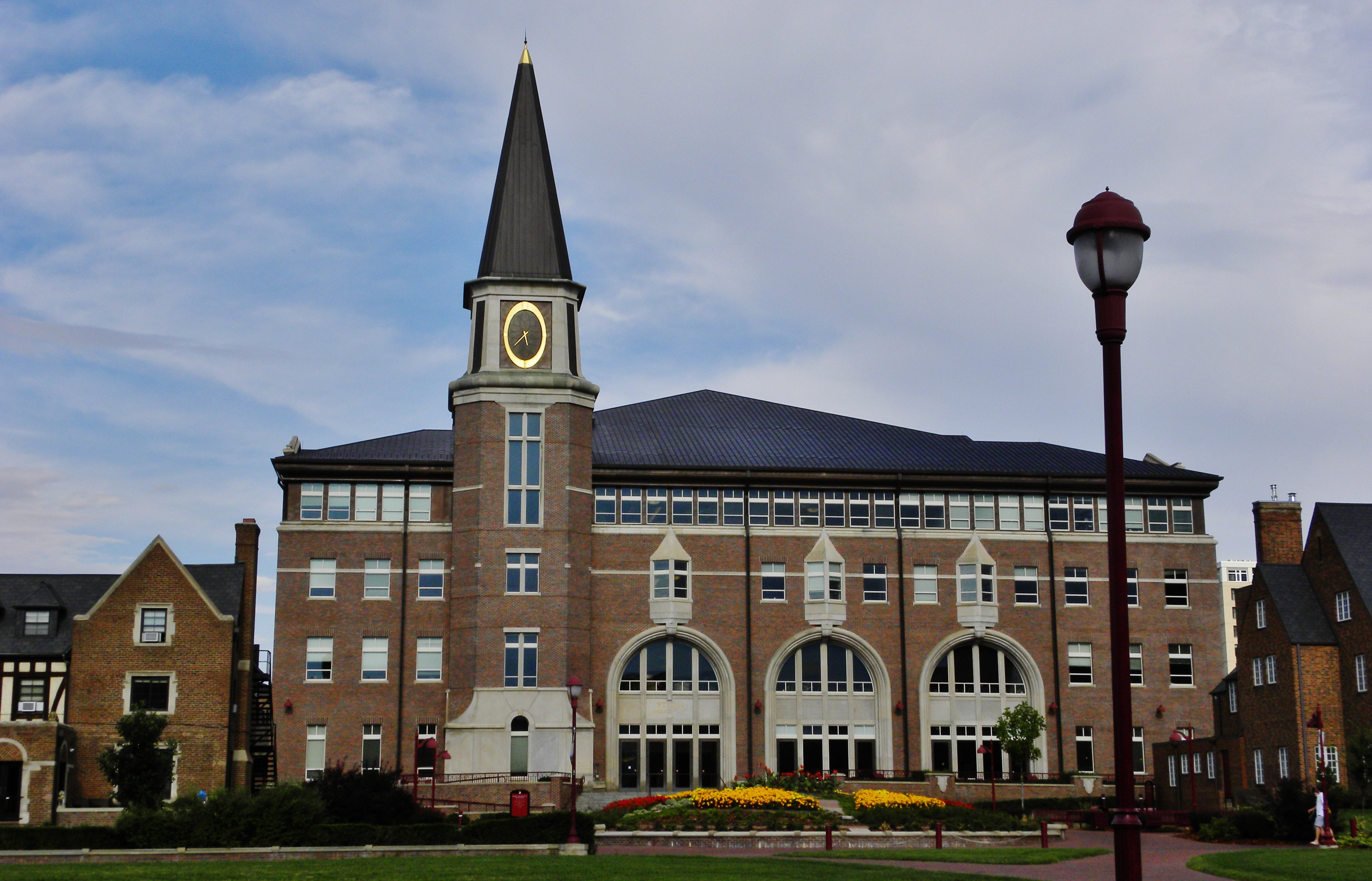
College of Law: The Second LEED Certified Green Law School in the Country

The Sturm College of Law is named for Donald L. Sturm, owner of Denver-based American National Bank, who graduated from the school in 1958 and gave the College of Law $20 million in 2003.

=== Campus ===
Since the fall of 2003, the Sturm College of Law has resided in the Frank H. Ricketson Jr. Law Building located on the University Park campus near the Ritchie Center. The new facility is distinguished as the nation's first certified "green" law building, having been awarded the Gold Leadership in Energy and Environmental Design (LEED) certification by the U.S. Green Building Council.

== Academics ==
=== Academic reputation ===
The University of Denver is currently ranked 78th in the nation by U.S. News & World Report. According to the 2014 U.S. News Peer Reputation Rankings the University of Denver Sturm College of Law ranked 55th in the nation out of 194 ranked law schools.

The school was ranked 40th for public interest law by the National Jurist. To support this initiative, the Sturm College of Law offers the Chancellor's Scholar Program with full tuition scholarships awarded to selected students. Every Juris Doctor student is required to perform a minimum of 50 hours of supervised, uncompensated, law-related public service work as a prerequisite for graduation.

=== Clinical programs ===
The University of Denver is the home of the first clinical programs in the nation, founded in 1904.

- Civil Litigation Clinic
- Civil Rights Clinic
- Criminal Defense Clinic
- Immigration Law & Policy Clinic
- Environmental Law Clinic
- Community Economic Development Clinic (transactional clinic)
- Low Income Taxpayer Clinic

The University of Denver is the home of the first clinical programs in the nation, founded in 1904.

=== Trial and appellate advocacy ===
The University of Denver's Center for Advocacy (CFA) was established in 2009 with a focus on providing Professional Education for its law students. It emphasizes synthesizing critical thinking, the law, and the professional knowledge required to succeed in the practice of law. The CFA focuses on the four areas of advocacy: Trial Advocacy; Pre-Trial Advocacy; Appellate Advocacy; and Client Advocacy.

The CFA's national prominence and reputation are evidenced by its annual prominent position in the rankings of advocacy programs in the U.S.

The majority of the law school's graduates ultimately practice in litigation or litigation-related careers. The CFA provides a professional approach, effectively employing both theoretical and simulated educational modalities, to prepare students for success in the “Profession That Takes the Oath.” The CFA's balanced approach to preparing students provides offerings that are seeded in three primary areas.

COURSES. The CFA offers a wide array of professionally-focused courses that provide students the opportunity to earn a Concentration in Trial & Litigation with a Focus in Criminal Litigation or Civil Litigation. The majority of the courses offered by the CFA are taught by professionals and practitioners in the given field in which they are teaching.

TEAMS. The CFA sponsors competitive “teams” that participate in educational tournaments across the U.S. The CFA's teams have a rich history of winning championships in both national “open” tournaments and national invitationals. The school's National Trial Team participates in the trial advocacy arena (mock trial), and the school's 14 appellate teams compete in the moot court arena. These teams are taught by practicing attorneys and presiding judges experienced in the specific field in which they are teaching.

EDUCATIONAL EVENTS. The CFA hosts numerous intra-school trial advocacy and appellate based educational tournaments throughout the academic year. Judges and attorneys are heavily involved in these educational exhibitions, providing students a wealth of professional insight and mentoring.

The CFA offerings provides a education platform by which a student can prepare themselves in their legal career.

== Employment statistics ==
54.1% of the Class of 2013 were found to be employed in long-term, full-time legal jobs (excepting solo practitioners) nine months after graduation. 31% of the Class of 2011 were employed in part-time or short-term jobs, unemployed and seeking employment or pursuing additional education. The employment status of 1.4% of the Class of 2011 was unknown. 0.7% of the Class of 2011 obtained a federal clerkship. 4.5% of the Class of 2011 were known to be employed in law firms of 101 attorneys or more. 18.1% of the Class of 2011 were known to be employed in full-time, long-term government or public interest jobs. 9.8% of the Class of 2011 were employed in school funded jobs. 37.3% of the Class of 2011 reported a full-time salary.

ABA Employment Summary for 2013 Graduates
Employment Status	Percentage
Employed - Bar Passage Required (Full-Time, Long-Term)	56.18%
Employed - Bar Passage Required (Part-Time and/or Short-Term)	8.61%
Employed - J.D. Advantage	19.48%
Employed - Professional Position	5.99%
Employed - Non-Professional Position	1.5%
Employed - Undeterminable	0.0%
Pursuing Graduate Degree Full Time	1.12%
Unemployed - Start Date Deferred	1.12%
Unemployed - Not Seeking	1.12%
Unemployed - Seeking	4.12%
Employment Status Unknown	0.75%
Total of 267 Graduates

== Costs ==
Tuition for the 2014–15 academic year is $42,120 for full-time students and $30,888 for part-time students. The total cost of attendance including tuition, fees and living expenses is $60,951 for full-time students and $49,687 for part-time students.

Law School Transparency calculates that the total debt-financed full cost of attendance for students in the Class of 2016, who do not receive tuition discounts (scholarships), to be $208,407. Law School Transparency projects that the monthly payment for the 10-year plan to be $2,477.

For full-time students in the class of 2016, Law School Transparency estimates that the total debt-financed cost of attendance for students who do not receive any scholarships is $208,407. This cost includes the cost of tuition, fees, and living expenses for 3 years, and the cost of student loan interest accrued over this time.

In the 2013–14 academic year, 46% of students received scholarships and the average scholarship award was $21,000. Average indebtedness for 2013 graduates who borrowed at least 1 loan was $130,981.

== Notable alumni ==
- Wilbur M. Alter, Justice on the Colorado Supreme Court
- Wayne N. Aspinall, former Congressman from Colorado
- Lewis Babcock, former federal judge for the United States District Court for the District of Colorado
- Charles F. Brannan, former Secretary of Agriculture
- Blake Brettschneider, former professional soccer player
- Ashlie Brillault, former Lizzie McGuire and The Lizzie McGuire Movie actress.
- Robyn Brody, associate justice of the Idaho Supreme Court
- Terrance Carroll, Speaker of the Colorado House of Representatives
- Jason Crow, Congressman from Colorado
- Pete Domenici, Senator from New Mexico
- Chase Iron Eyes, Lakota lawyer and founder of Last Real Indians, from Standing Rock Sioux Reservation
- Adrian Fontes, Arizona Secretary of State
- William D. Ford, former United States Congressman from Michigan
- John L. Kane Jr., former federal judge for the United States District Court for the District of Colorado
- Rebecca Ann King, former Miss America
- Paul Laxalt, Former Governor of Nevada and Senator from Nevada
- Valentino Mazzia (1922–1999), forensic anesthesiologist.
- Phil McGrane, Secretary of State of Idaho
- Mike McKevitt, former United States Congressman from Colorado
- Harry N. MacLean, 1967, true crime author and also an adjunct professor at the school
- Larry Mizel, philanthropist and founder of MDC Holdings
- Ostis Otto Moore, Justice on the Colorado Supreme Court
- Shahzada Jamal Nazir, former Federal Minister for the ministries of National Health Services, Religious Affairs, National Heritage & Integration and National Harmony, Government of Pakistan
- Jim Nicholson, former Secretary of Veteran Affairs
- Gale Norton, former Secretary of the Interior
- Brian Parker, former Denver Broncos tight end
- Byron G. Rogers, former United States Congressman from Colorado
- Andrew Romanoff, former Speaker of the Colorado House of Representatives
- Carlos Samour, Justice on the Colorado Supreme Court
- Karl C. Schuyler, former Senator from Colorado
- Alvin Wiederspahn (1949-2014), member of both houses of the Wyoming State Legislature; was an attorney in Cheyenne
- A. L. Zinn, 1924, Justice of the New Mexico Supreme Court

== Notable faculty ==
- Christine Arguello, judge of the U.S. District Court for the District of Colorado
- Melissa Hart, Associate Justice of the Colorado Supreme Court
- Troy A. Eid, United States Attorney for the District of Colorado

== Publications ==
- Denver Law Review
- Race to the Bottom Blog
- Denver Journal of International Law and Policy
- Sports and Entertainment Law Journal
- Transportation Law Journal
- University of Denver Criminal Law Review
- University of Denver Water Law Review
