= Larry Mizel =

American businessman

Larry A. Mizel
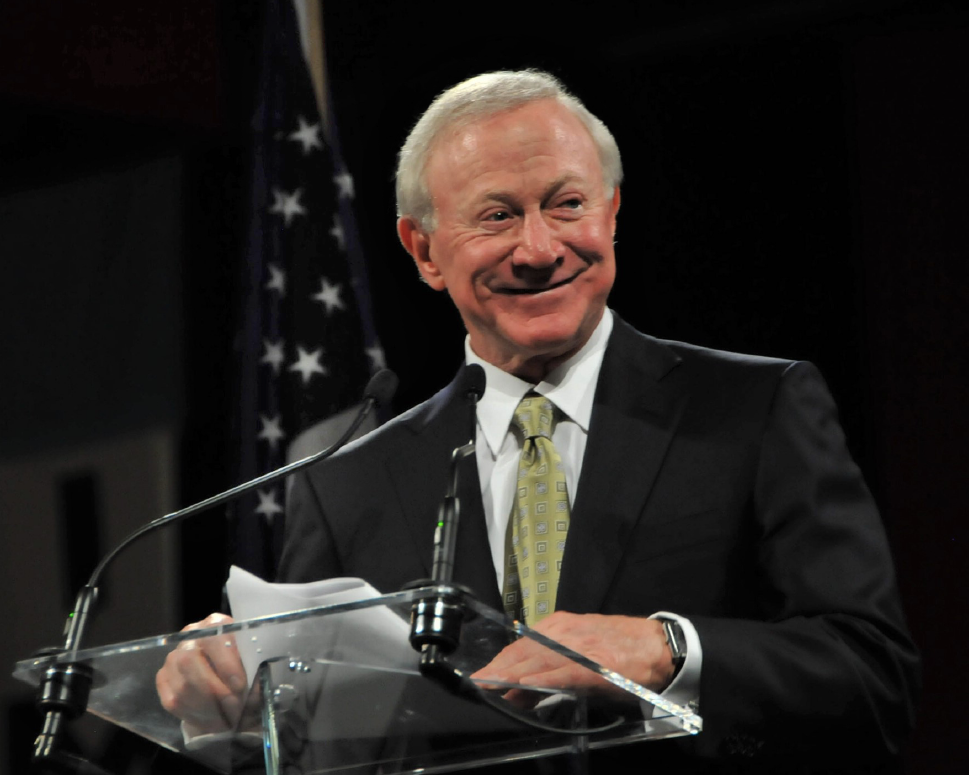
- Mizel in 2024
- Born: September 14, 1942 (age 83)
- Education: University of Oklahoma; University of Denver College of Law
- Occupations: Business executive, philanthropist
- Spouse: Carol Mizel
- Children: 2

Larry A. Mizel (born September 14, 1942) is an American business executive and philanthropist based in Denver, Colorado. He is the former President, CEO, and Executive Chairman of MDC Holdings.

== Early life ==
Larry A. Mizel was born to a Jewish family in 1942. He graduated with a bachelor's degree in business administration from the University of Oklahoma in 1964, and with a JD from the University of Denver College of Law in 1967.

== Career ==
In 1972, Mizel founded the Mizel Development Corporation, which became M.D.C. Holdings, Inc. (MDC), a New York Stock Exchange-listed homebuilding company. MDC is the parent company of Richmond American Homes, which has homebuilding operations in 15 U.S. states. It is one of the few homebuilding-based companies to receive an investment-grade rating from all three rating agencies and is recognized as one of the top home builders in the United States. MDC was ranked 12 on the annual Builder 100 list published by Builder Magazine in 2021. Other MDC subsidiaries include HomeAmerican Mortgage Corporation, American Home Title and Escrow Company and American Home Insurance Agency, Inc.

Mizel was elected Chief Executive Officer of the company in 1988, a position he held until he assumed the role of Executive Chairman of the Board in October 2020.

In a Business Den article in 2024, Mizel described the history of MDC:

"In our remarkable journey, marked by the construction of over 240,000 homes, we’ve emerged as a top 10 homebuilder in the United States. Our ability to navigate through varying housing market cycles while maintaining business resilience speaks to our strategic prowess, and has led not only to the creation of significant shareholder value, but also to an industry-leading dividend yield for our shareholders."

Mizel was also a founder of Asset Investors Corporation (AIC), a New York Stock Exchange-listed real estate investment trust, and was a chairman of its board until 1996. He also sat on the board of Commercial Assets Inc. (CAX), a real estate investment trust, that traded on the American Stock Exchange. Until 1995, he was chairman of the board of directors of Omnibank, a multibank holding company, until its sale to KeyCorp.

In April 2024, Japan-based homebuilder, Sekisui House, purchased MDC Holdings for $4.9 billion. With this acquisition, the Sekisui House US Holdings portfolio rose to number five among homebuilders by closing volume.

Mizel’s departure from the M.D.C. Holdings was December 31, 2024, after over 50 years with the company. Mr. Mizel, along with President and CEO of the company, David Mandarich, put forth a joint statement about the transition:

“We are grateful to the Sekisui House team, which has shown the utmost respect and professionalism to us and our valued employees throughout the acquisition process and during the initial months of our integration. This experience only reinforces our belief that our employees and our customers are in good hands as a part of the Sekisui House family.”

As of 2024, MDC had built over 250,000 homes with a footprint across 15 states nationwide. Mizel and Mandarich are quoted to give credit to their team saying “even more proud of the team we have built and what they will accomplish in the future as a part of the combined organization.”

== Philanthropic activities ==
Mizel has been actively involved in many charitable, religious and community causes.

=== Simon Wiesenthal Center ===
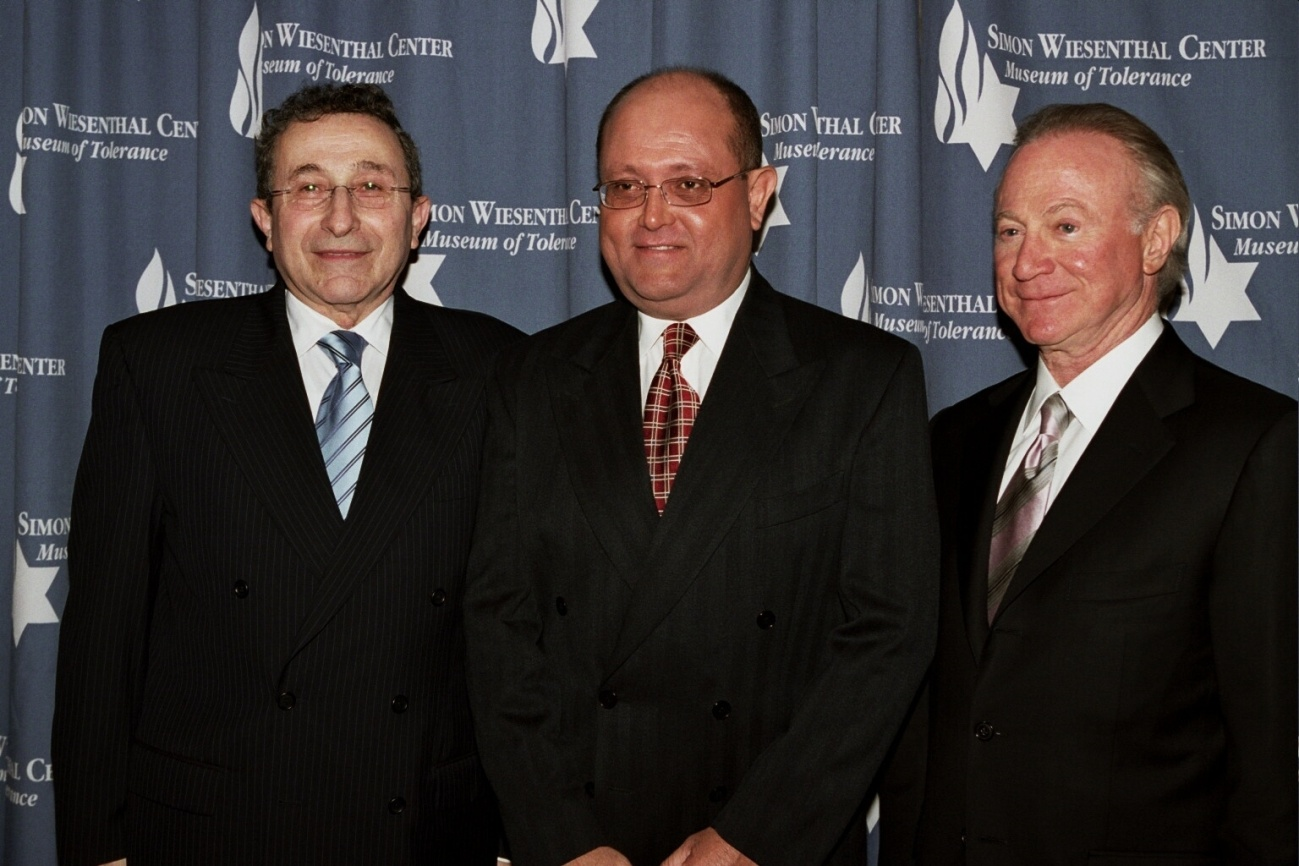
Rabbi Marvin Hier, Gilberto Bosques, Larry A. Mizel at the Simon Wiesenthal Center

Mizel played a key role in the Simon Wiesenthal Center, a Los Angeles based international human rights organization that promotes tolerance and combats racism and anti-Semitism around the world. He was the second to hold the position of International Chairman of the Board of Trustees for the Simon Wiesenthal Center, an appointment he held for 20 years. The Simon Wiesenthal Center is accredited as a non-governmental organization (NGO) at international agencies including the United Nations, UNESCO, the OAS, the Council of Europe and the Latin American Parliament. The center’s educational arm, the Museum of Tolerance in Los Angeles, received the 2004 Tolerance Award given at the United Nations.

=== Museum of Tolerance Jerusalem (MOTJ) ===
After being in development for more than 20 years, the new Museum of Tolerance Jerusalem (MOTJ), co-founded and chaired by Mizel, partially opened in May 2023. The two upper floors are open to visitors, including a large auditorium and a multi-use space for exhibitions, conferences and events.

Originally designed by Chyutin Architects (Barache and Michael Chutin), Yigal Levy & Canon Design finished the 17,500 square meter facility that is located on a three-acre, $300 million MOTJ campus straddling the West Jerusalem city center and the Old City. According to their website, the MOTJ celebrates "the vibrancy of Israel’s democracy by promoting universal respect and co-existence and will deal with the vital issues of the 21st century." It will include a museum, children's museum, outdoor amphitheater, international conference center, social lab and gardens.

The museum opened with a photographic exhibition marking 75 years of Israeli independence.

In a 2021 Jewish Insider article, the museum’s director of operations Jonathan Riss credited Mizel as “the driving force that has kept the project going through numerous hurdles.”

"[Larry Mizel] is the type of guy that never says never, and he sees this building as a game changer for Israeli society,” said Riss. “He has the tenacity to go through battles and because of that we will finish it and you will see the results."

In an article by The Jerusalem Post, Mizel was quoted on the many challenges the project faced, which were listed as bureaucratic, architectural and legal in nature:

"My mission to establish this museum is rooted in my steadfast commitment to Jewish values and combating antisemitism and other atrocities. This is what drove me, despite all the obstacles along the way, to fight for this dream and establish this hub of tolerance and solidarity. For me, tikkun olam [fixing the world] starts here. In this place, we will spread the values of coexistence and peace throughout the world and fight against hatred and racism of all kinds."

Mizel has funded grants for several other Jewish organizations, such as the American Israel Education Foundation, Yeshiva Toras Chaim in Denver, Hillel of Colorado, American Friends of Yeshiva High School, BBYO, Friends of the IDF, Jewish Colorado and the Jewish Community Center.

=== Mizel Museum and the Counterterrorism Education Learning Lab (the CELL) ===
In 1982, Mizel and his wife, Carol, founded the Mizel Museum in Denver, Colorado. The museum provides regular artistic and educational programs that promote community understanding and tolerance for residents of the Rocky Mountain region. The Mizel Center for Arts and Culture (The MACC) is also named for Mizel, but is a separate organization located in Denver at the Jewish Community Center. The MACC illuminates the human experience through creative and cultural programs in the performing, visual, and literary arts for the Jewish Community and the community at large.

Mizel also founded, as a part of the Mizel Museum and its larger umbrella organization, the Mizel Institute, the Counterterrorism Education Learning Lab (the CELL) in 2004. The CELL is a non-profit institution dedicated to preventing terrorism through education, empowerment and engagement. The CELL has been endorsed by former Secretaries of Homeland Security, Janet Napolitano, Tom Ridge and Michael Chertoff.

==== Exhibit ====
Located in Denver, the CELL opened its facility in 2008 with the purpose of educating citizens on global terrorism threats. The CELL’s exhibit is interactive and provides visitors with an understanding of the history of terrorism, the methods terrorists employ and the terrorism’s effect on society.

==== Speaker series ====
The CELL hosts a speaker series inviting experts, senior government officials and foreign dignitaries to address issues surrounding terrorism and global security. Past speakers have included Senator John McCain, former U.S. Secretary of Defense, Leon Panetta, Former National Security Advisor H.R. McMaster, Former Chief of Staff to the Secretary of Defense, Jeremy Bash, and the Director of the National Counterterrorism Center, Matthew G. Olsen.

==== Community Awareness Program (CAP) ====
The CELL runs the Community Awareness Program (CAP), an interactive awareness program designed to provide citizens with the basic tools to recognize and help prevent terrorism and criminal activity in support of the Department of Homeland Security’s “If You See Something, Say Something” campaign.

=== Denver Rustlers and the Annual Junior Livestock Sale ===
Mizel works with other Colorado business leaders as a founding member of the Denver Rustlers. The organization raises scholarship money for exhibitors at the Junior Livestock Sale at the annual Colorado State Fair. In the 40 years since inception, the organization has raised over $3 million in support of young Colorado ranchers and farmers as a way to earn money for college.

== In the News ==
As co-founder and chair of the Museum of Tolerance Jerusalem, Larry Mizel made introductory remarks at the “Celebrate the Faces of Israel” conference on April 27, 2023. The conference was intended to celebrate people who have built and strengthened Israel over the last 75 years, as well as its diversity and tolerance:

“The Museum of Tolerance Jerusalem constitutes by its very nature a center in which people will become familiar with the fundamental value of the Jewish people and one that will become a modern Abrahamic tent.”

Politicians participating in the event included President Isaac Herzog, US Ambassador to Israel, Thomas Nides, Jerusalem Mayor, Moshe Lion, and Florida Governor, Ron DeSantis.

In the October before the 2024 presidential election, Mr. Mizel and U.S. Senator, Cory Gardner, hosted a private fundraiser in Aspen, Colorado featuring Republican Vice Presidential Candidate, J.D. Vance.

== Foundation ==
Larry A. Mizel is the Chairman of the Mizel-Mandarich Foundation, formerly the MDC/Richmond American Foundation, which was established in 1999. Since inception, millions of dollars have been donated to organizations across the United States and abroad.

In 2005, the Richmond American Foundation donated $1 million to the National Homeland Defense Fund.

The Richmond American Foundation began supporting The Denver Posts' Season to Share program in 2005. Season to Share is an annual holiday fundraising campaign with a matching grant, the proceeds of which go to support local charitable organizations that support low-income children, families and adults moving out of poverty. By 2016, the Richmond American Foundation had contributed more $1.7 million for this cause.

The Foundation restructured in 2016 and is currently a supporting organization of Lion Global Foundation.

== Community activism ==
Mizel is Founder and Chair Emeritus of Colorado Concern, an organization committed to promoting sustainable business growth and advancing the economic well-being of Colorado. Consisting of over 140 CEOs and community leaders across Colorado, the organization commits financial resources to support legislative candidates and policies that share the goal of maximizing the state’s economic status.

At a Colorado Concern event in 2017, former Colorado senator Cory Gardner paid tribute to Mr. Mizel:

“Larry Mizel is somebody who has stood up for Colorado values to make Colorado a stronger place, a better business community. Somebody who understood the importance of bringing business leaders together with public policy leaders. He’s been a passionate advocate for Israel, a passionate advocate for tolerance in our communities. Whether it’s his work at the Mizel Museum or the CELL, he’s done a great job to educate our country, our public, our state, on the values of hard work, collaboration and finding solutions to bring about a better world.”

In 2002, Mizel became a member of the board of directors of the American Israel Public Affairs Committee (AIPAC), a group that advocates pro-Israel policies to the U.S. Congress and Executive Branch.

In 2016, Mizel served as the Colorado finance chairman for then-presidential candidate Donald Trump’s campaign.

In 2019, Mizel helped fund Colorado Governor Jared Polis’ (D) inauguration committee.

Every May, the Mizel Institute, holds a charitable event with more than 1,000 attendees, including Colorado A-listers, to celebrate philanthropic works, promote religious and racial tolerance, and preserve Jewish culture. Larry Mizel is responsible for gathering both Democrats and Republicans at these events.

"Mizel has also been a major force in shaping Colorado public policy for many decades, particularly through his founding of Colorado Concern which brings together dozens of the state’s top chief executives."

In 2024, the Mizel Institute honored football hall-of-famer, Peyton Manning, with the Mizel Community Enrichment Award. Past recipients include John Elway and Colorado Governor, Jared Polis.

== Awards and recognition ==
Over the years, Mizel has been the recipient of recognition by various organizations.

=== 80s and 90s ===
In 1987, Mizel received the National Humanitarian Award from National Jewish Health, a global leader in the research and treatment of respiratory, immune and related diseases.

He was also named Honorary Dean of the University of Denver's Burns School of Real Estate and Construction Management in 1996.

=== Early 2000s ===
In 2001, Mizel was the recipient of the distinguished Ellis Island Medal of Honor, which pays tribute to the immigrant experience and individual achievement. Honorees are listed in the Congressional Record.

The next year, he was awarded the title Honorary Irishman by the Ancient Order of Hiberians, a Catholic-Irish-American Fraternal Organization founded in 1836, for his work in supporting the heroes of the September 11 attacks in 2001.

Mizel was also made an Honorary Colonel of the 88th Regiment of the Army for his creation of the Victims of Terror Fund in 2003.

In 2005, Mizel received the Defenders of Freedom award from the National Homeland Defense Foundation, an organization that is dedicated to securing freedom in the fields of homeland defense and security.

The Kempe Foundation is a nonprofit that supports the prevention and treatment of child abuse and neglect. Mr. Mizel was named a Kempe community honoree in 2006, along with David Mandarich.

=== 2010s ===
In 2010, Mizel was awarded the Ben S. Wendelken Special Trustees Award by Colorado's El Pomar Foundation for embodying the spirit of service and giving through his life's work.

Mizel received the Steve Ross Lifetime Achievement Award from the Milken Institute in 2011 and was named a Colorado State Patrol honorary colonel. He was also named the "7th Most Powerful Person" in Denver by the magazine 5280 that same year.

United States Senator Mark Udall paid tribute to Larry from the Senate Floor in 2012. The tribute is available in the Congressional Record. Senator Udall is quoted as saying:

"There are very few leaders who have brought our community together since September 11, 2001, like Larry has. Larry has rallied Coloradans together literally to remember the heroes and victims of 9/11 and to rise up against the evils of terrorism. It is what he does best: He assembles diverse groups of people, finds their commonality, and marshals them toward a noble purpose. Larry cares greatly about the security of the United States, as well as our allies worldwide. And he will stop at nothing to try to create a world where people do not live under the constant threat of attack, whether by persecutors, terrorists, or other enemies."

In 2014, Mizel was named the "15th Most Powerful Person" in Denver by the magazine 5280.

The Colorado Branch of Volunteers of America (VOA) recognized Larry Mizel for his generosity to the VOA and other organizations by presenting him with the Humanitarian Award during the annual Western Fantasy gala at the National Western Event Center in 2016.

Mizel was then inducted into the Colorado Business Hall of Fame in 2016 by Junior Achievement-Rocky Mountain and the Denver Metro Chamber of Commerce. A video of the presentation can be viewed on the Junior Achievement YouTube channel.

=== 2020s ===
Mizel was awarded the 2024 Fire in the Gut Award by the Navy SEAL Foundation for his extensive contributions to military and veteran support. The award was presented during the Navy SEAL Foundation's Denver Evening of Tribute, where Senator Michael Bennet read a tribute for the Congressional Record and was named by The Denver Post as one of the "150 Most Influential and Notable People in Colorado History" in 2026.

== Personal life ==
Mizel and his wife, Carol, have an adult son, a daughter and six grandchildren.
