= Kansai Airports =

Japanese corporation established in 2015

- Native name: 関西エアポート株式会社
- Romanized name: Kansai Eapōto Kabushiki-gaisha
- Formerly: Orix-Vinci airport consortium
- Company type: Private KK
- Industry: Transport
- Founded: December 1, 2015; 10 years ago
- Headquarters: Kansai Airport, Osaka, Japan
- Area served: Worldwide
- Key people: Yoshiyuki Yamaya (Representative Director and CEO); Benoît Rulleau (Representative Director and Co-CEO)
- Products: Airport Management; Infrastructure Management
- Owner: Orix (40%); Vinci SA (40%)
- Website: www.kansai-airports.co.jp

Kansai Airports (関西エアポート株式会社, Kansai Eapōto Kabushiki-gaisha) is a Japanese corporation established in 2015. Kansai Airports is a member of the Kansai Airports Group, which includes eight companies.

Kansai Airports is currently operating three airports in Japan, Kansai International Airport, Osaka International Airport and Kobe Airport. The operation rights of Kansai International Airport and Osaka International Airport were transferred to Kansai Airports from New Kansai International Airport Co., Ltd. (NKIAC) on the 1st of April 2016. On the 1st of April 2018, Kansai Airports Kobe, a wholly owned subsidiary of Kansai Airports, took over the operation of Kobe Airport from Kobe City.

== Mission ==
The company's mission according to its official website is:

to be renowned as a pioneer in the aviation industry within the Asia Pacific region, and to become a world-class international airport operator by continuously raising performance standards for airports.

== Ownership ==
The shareholders' percentage ownership of Kansai Airports are Orix 40%, Vinci Airports 40% and the rest 20% is shared among Asics; Iwatani Corporation; Osaka Gas; Obayashi Corporation; Omron; Kansai Electric Power Company; Kintetsu Group Holdings; Keihan Holdings Co., Ltd.; Suntory; JTB; Sekisui House; Daikin Industries, Ltd.; Daiwa House Industry Co., Ltd.; Takenaka Corporation; Nankai Electric Railway Co., Ltd.; Nippon Telegraph and Telephone West Corporation; Panasonic; Hankyu Hanshin Holdings, Inc.; Rengo Co., Ltd.; The Senshu Ikeda Bank, Ltd.; Kiyo Holdings, Inc.; The Bank of Kyoto, Ltd.; The Shiga Bank，Ltd.; The Nanto Bank, Ltd.; Nippon Life Insurance Company; Mizuho Bank, Ltd.; Sumitomo Mitsui Trust Bank, Ltd.; MUFG Bank, Ltd.; Resona Bank, Ltd.; and the Private Finance Initiative Promotion Corporation of Japan.

== List of Kansai Airports Group companies ==
As of April 1, 2019, the Kansai Airports Group consists of the following companies:

- Kansai Airports
- Kansai Airports Retail & Services
- Kansai Airports Operation Services
- Kansai Airports Technical Services
- CKTS Co., Ltd.
- KIA Heating & Cooling Supply Co., Ltd.
- World Air Passenger Service Co., Ltd.
- Kansai Airports Kobe

== Gallery ==
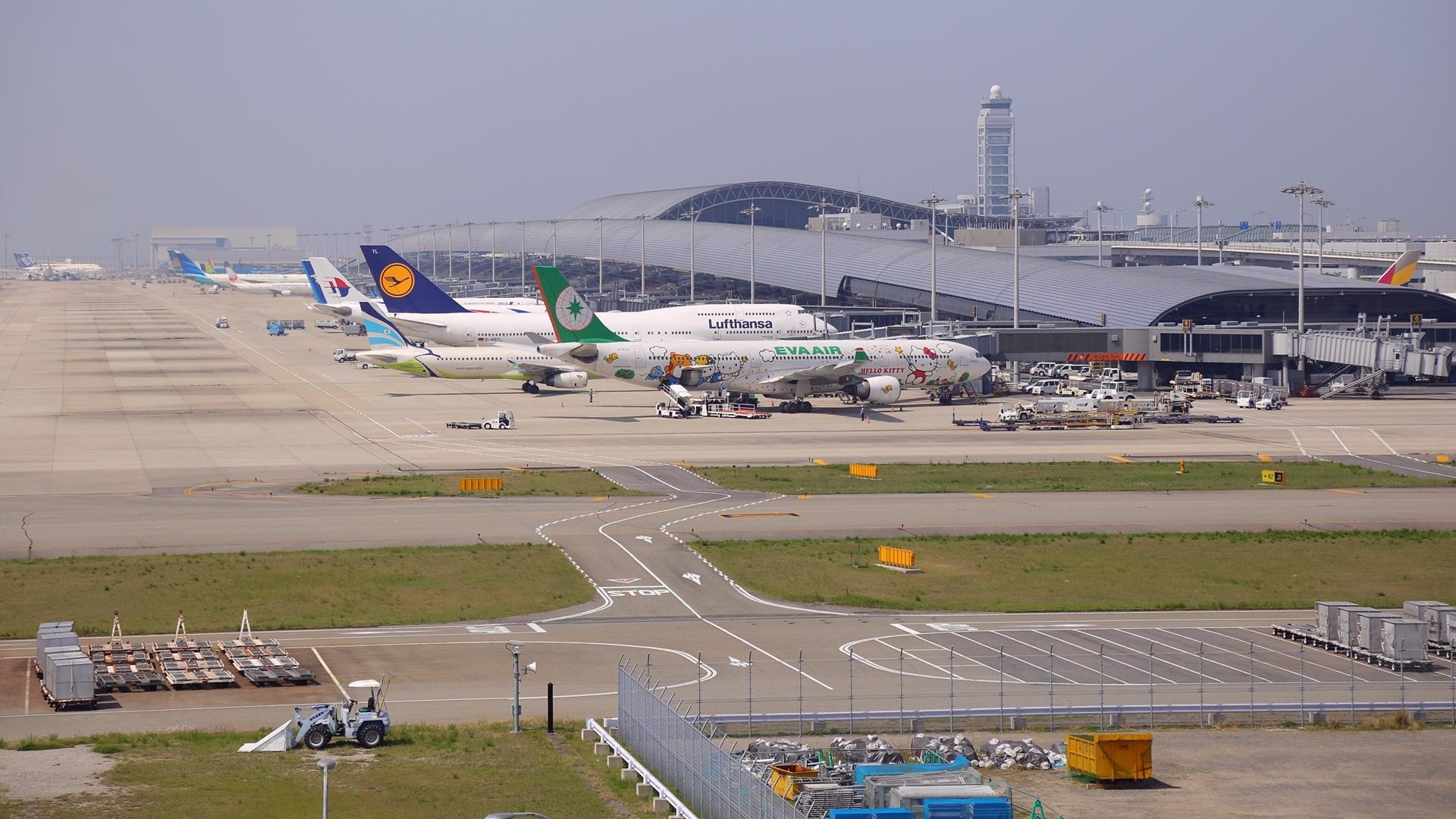
Kansai International Airport, headquarters of Kansai Airports.

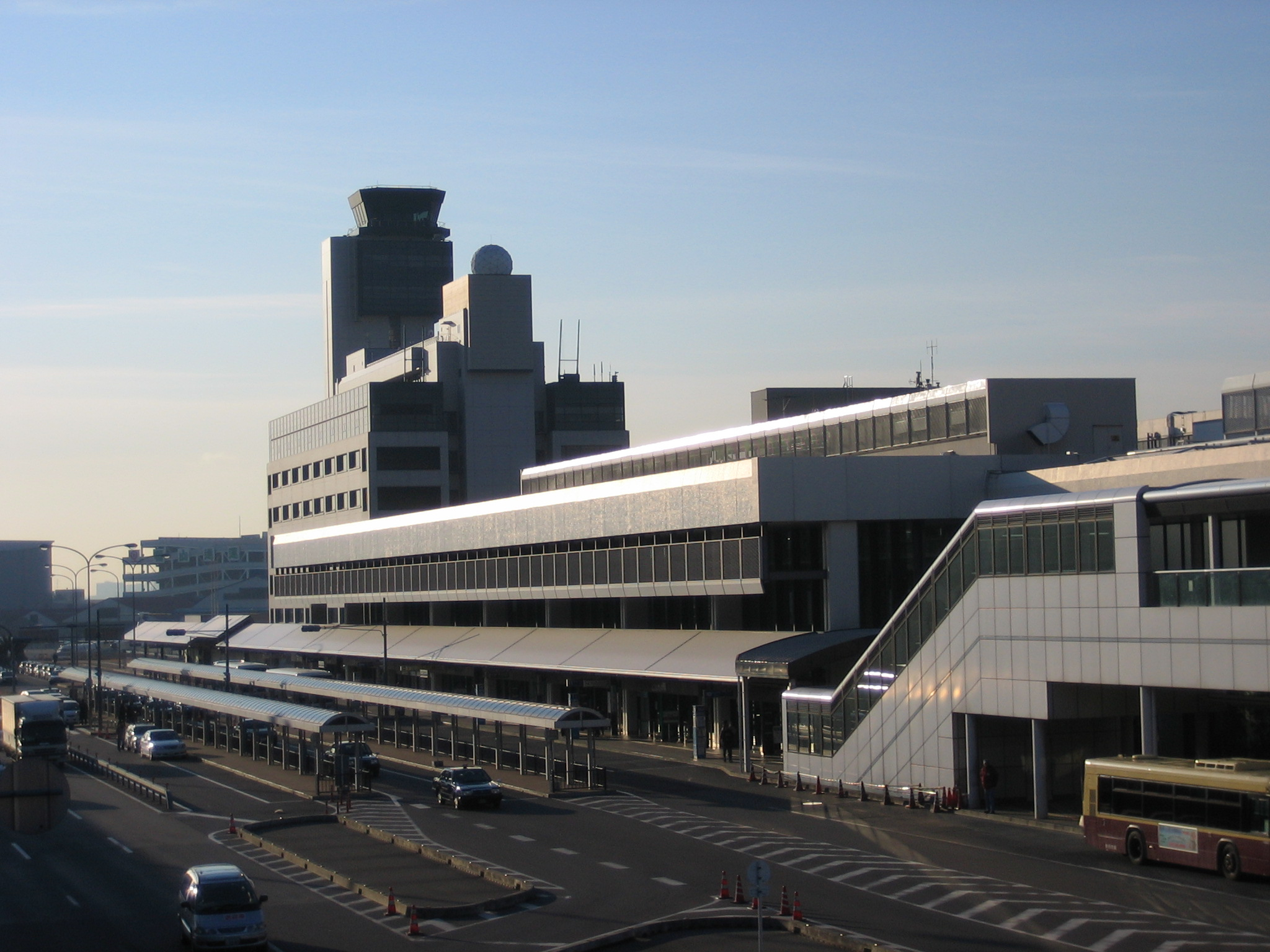
Osaka International Airport

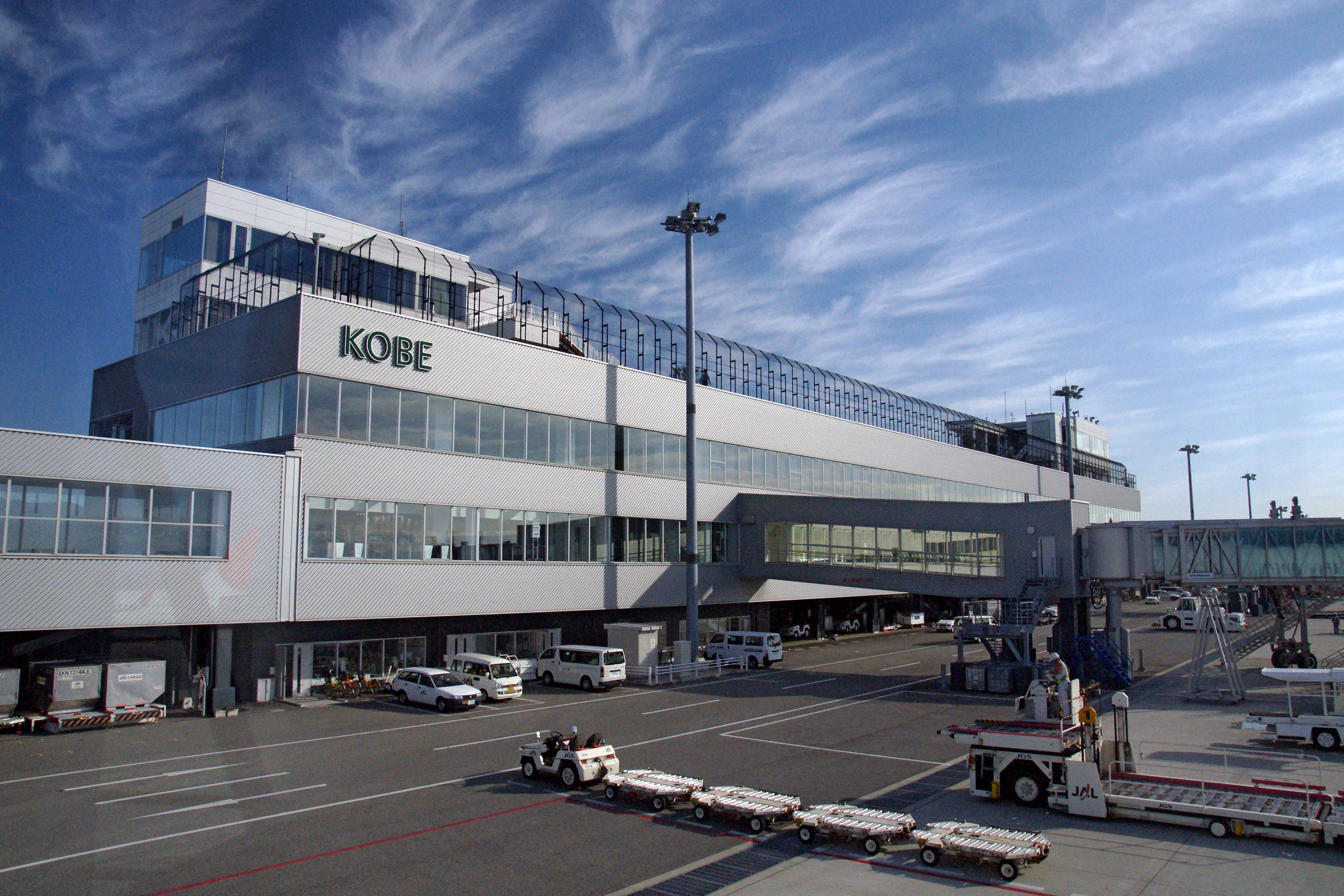
Kobe Airport
