= University of Denver Water Law Review =

- Discipline: Water law
- Language: English
- Edited by: Zack Alberts

Publication details
- History: 1997-present
- Publisher: Sturm College of Law, University of Denver (United States)
- Frequency: Biannually

Standard abbreviations
- Bluebook: U. Denv. Water L. Rev.
- ISO 4: Univ. Denver Water Law Rev.

Indexing
- ISSN: 1521-3455
- OCLC no.: 39000677

Links
- Journal homepage; Blog; Online archives

The University of Denver Water Law Review is a law journal focused on ideas, information, and legal and policy analyses concerning water law. Launched in 1997, it is published by students at the Sturm College of Law at the University of Denver in Colorado.

== Overview ==
The Water Law Review publishes two issues each year and contains articles, case notes, book reviews, case summaries and legislative updates written by lawyers, academics, and students. The review also provides an online supplement discussing the legal and policy implications of current events. It is the only student-run journal in the United States exclusively discussing water law and policy.

Colorado Supreme Court Justice Gregory J Hobbs Jr. was a frequent contributor to the review during his tenure on the bench and as a faculty member at the Sturm College of Law. The review is widely circulated among water lawyers and academics across the Rocky Mountain Region thanks to the student staff's involvement with the Colorado Bar Association, the various events the review hosts (including the annual symposia), and the inclusion of student papers winning the Professor Fred Cheever Environmental and Natural Resources Writing Award.

=== Symposia ===
Additionally, the review hosts an annual "Water Law Symposium" in the spring. The symposia bring together lawyers, students, politicians, policy-makers, practitioners, and other stakeholders from across the Rocky Mountain region to discuss developing issues in water law. At the 2023 symposium (entitled Water Fluency: Experience Leads to Innovation in the Rocky Mountain West,) Governor Jared Polis delivered remarks describing how addressing housing affordability and sustainability can mitigate Colorado's water crisis.
