= Kansai International Airport =

Civilian airport serving Osaka, Japan

Kansai International Airport 関西国際空港

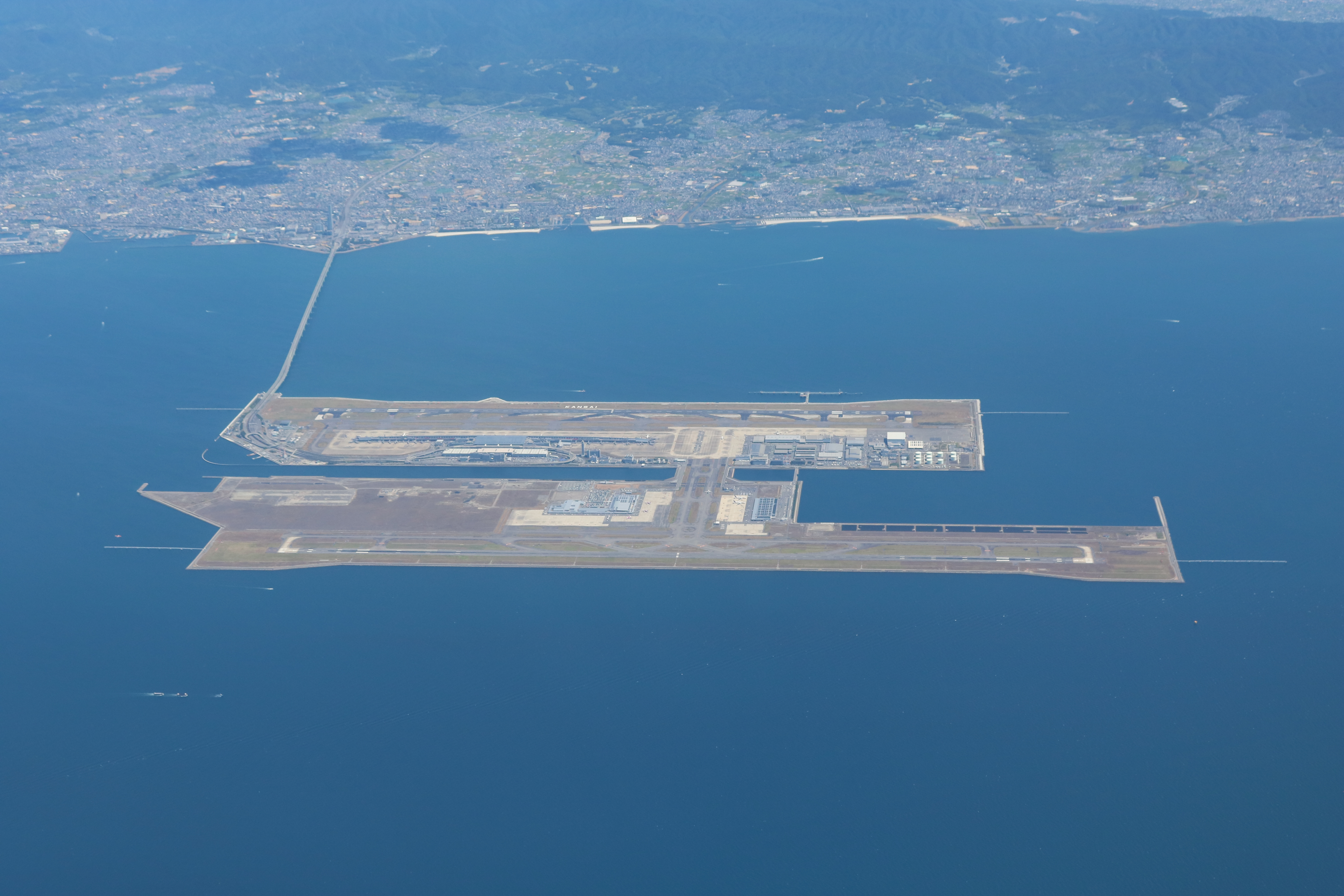
- Kansai International Airport (August 2022)
- IATA: KIX; ICAO: RJBB; WMO: 47774

Summary
- Airport type: Public
- Owner: New Kansai International Airport Company (NKIAC)
- Operator: Kansai Airports (Orix and Vinci Airports)
- Serves: Keihanshin
- Location: Izumisano, Sennan, & Tajiri; Osaka Prefecture
- Opened: 4 September 1994; 32 years ago
- Hub for: All Nippon Airways; FedEx Express; Japan Airlines; Nippon Cargo Airlines
- Operating base for: Jetstar Japan; Peach
- Elevation AMSL: 5 m (16 ft)
- Coordinates: 34°25′50″N 135°13′49″E
- Website: www.kansai-airport.or.jp/en/

Maps
- Location in Osaka Prefecture Location in Japan Location in Asia
- Interactive map of Kansai International Airport

Runways
| Direction | Length | | Surface |
| Direction | m | ft | Surface |
|---|---|---|---|
| 06R/24L | 3,500 | 11,483 | Asphalt |
| 06L/24R | 4,000 | 13,123 | Asphalt |

Statistics (2025)
- Passenger movements: 34,102,723 (▲11%)
- International passenger movements: 27,531,416 (▲15%)
- Aircraft movements: 212,224 (▲10%)
- Freight volume in tonnes: 786,814 (▲4%)
- International freight volume in tonnes: 777,780 (▲4%)

Kansai International Airport (Japanese: 関西国際空港, romanized: Kansai Kokusai Kūkō; IATA: KIX, ICAO: RJBB), commonly known as Kankū (Japanese: 関空) is the primary international airport in the Greater Osaka Area of Japan and the closest international airport to the cities of Osaka, Kyoto, and Kobe. It is located on the artificial island of Kankūjima (関空島), in the middle of Osaka Bay off the Honshu shore, 38 km (24 mi) southwest of Ōsaka Station, located within three municipalities, including Izumisano (north), Sennan (south), and Tajiri (central), in Osaka Prefecture. The airport's first airport island covers approximately 510 hectares (1,260 acres) and the second covers approximately 545 hectares (1,347 acres), for a total of 1,055 hectares (2,607 acres).

Kansai opened on 4 September 1994 to relieve overcrowding at Osaka International Airport, also called Itami Airport, which is closer to Osaka. It consists of two terminals: Terminal 1 and Terminal 2. Terminal 1, designed by Italian architect Renzo Piano, is the longest airport terminal in the world with a length of 1.7 km (1 1/16 mi). The airport serves as an international hub for All Nippon Airways, Japan Airlines, and Nippon Cargo Airlines and as a hub for Peach, the first international low-cost carrier in Japan. It is also the north Pacific hub for FedEx Express, which obtained fifth freedom rights under the 1998 U.S. and Japan air agreement and established the hub in 2014.

In calendar year 2025, 34.1 million passengers used the airport, including 27.5 million on international flights, and freight volume was 786,814 tonnes. In fiscal year 2025, international passenger numbers reached a record 27.08 million, and international passenger flight movements reached a record 142,753. The 4,000 m × 60 m (13,120 ft × 200 ft) second runway was opened on 2 August 2007. As of June 2014, Kansai Airport has become an Asian hub, with 780 weekly flights to Asia and Australasia (including 119 freight), 59 weekly flights to Europe and the Middle East (5 freight), and 80 weekly flights to North America (42 freight).

In 2020, Kansai was ranked the tenth-best airport in the world by Skytrax and received its awards for Best Airport Staff in Asia, World's Best Airport Staff, and World's Best Airport for Baggage Delivery.

== History ==
In the 1960s, when the Kansai region was rapidly losing trade to Tokyo, planners proposed a new airport near Kobe and Osaka. The city's original international airport, Itami Airport, located in the densely populated suburbs of Itami and Toyonaka, was surrounded by buildings; it could not be expanded, and many of its neighbours had filed complaints because of noise pollution problems. Expansion at Itami was also constrained by geography, because the airport was surrounded by mountainous terrain; offshore construction therefore became the practical alternative.

After the protests surrounding New Tokyo International Airport (now Narita International Airport), which was built with expropriated land in a rural part of Chiba Prefecture, planners decided to build the airport offshore. The new airport was part of a number of new developments to revitalize Osaka, which had been losing economic and cultural ground to Tokyo for most of the century.

Initially, the airport was planned to be built near Kobe, but the city of Kobe refused the plan, so the airport was moved to a more southerly location on Osaka Bay. The offshore location allowed 24-hour operation, unlike its predecessor in the city.

=== Construction ===
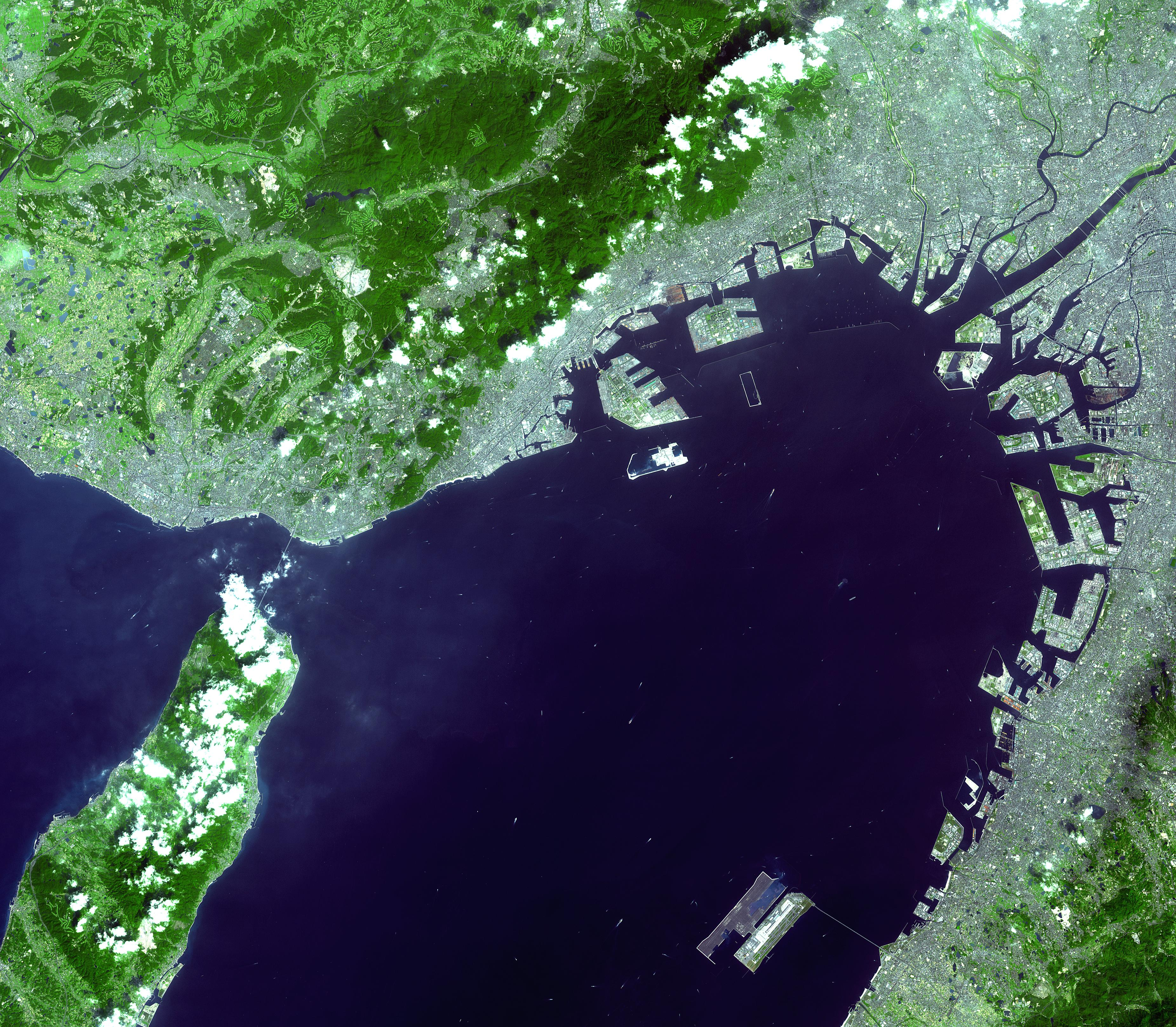
Satellite photo of Kansai Airport (lower-right island) in Osaka Bay. Kobe Airport is being built on the unfinished island near the middle of the photo. Central Osaka is in the upper-right corner, along with Osaka International

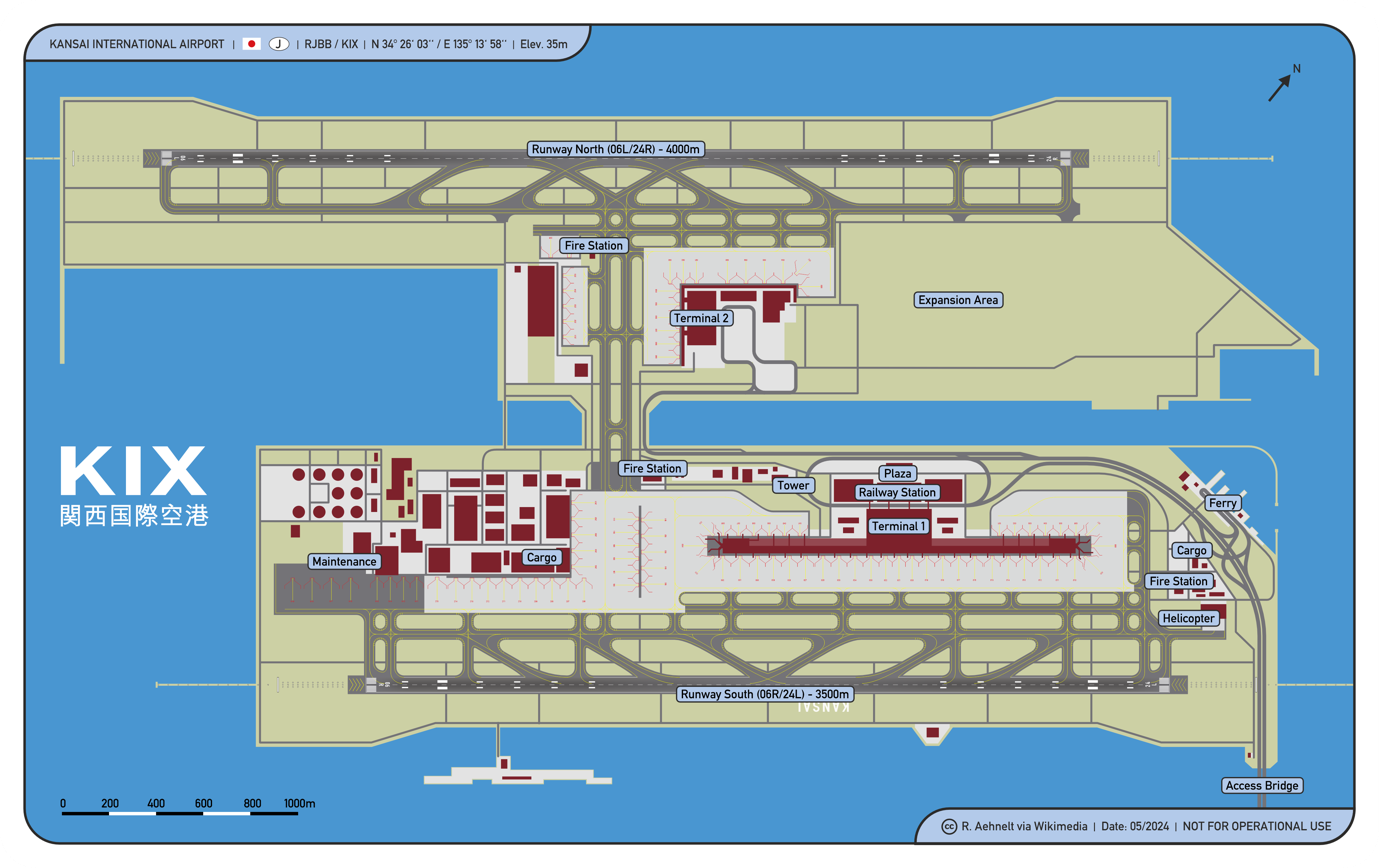
Airport map

An artificial island, 4 km (2 1/2 mi) long and 2.5 km (1 1/2 mi) wide, was proposed. Engineers needed to overcome the extremely high risks of earthquakes and typhoons (with storm surges of up to 3 m or 10 ft). The water depth is 18 metres (59 ft) on top of 20 metres (66 ft) of soft Holocene clay which holds 70% water. A million sand drains were built into the clay to remove water and solidify the clay.

Construction started in 1987. The sea wall was finished in 1989 (made of rock and 48,000 tetrapods). Three mountains were excavated for 21 million cubic metres (27 million cubic yards), and 180 million cubic metres (240 million cubic yards) was used to construct island 1. Over three years, 10,000 workers using 80 ships took 10 million man-hours to complete the 30-or-40-metre (100 or 130 ft) layer of earth over the sea floor and inside the sea wall. In 1990, a three-point-seven-five-kilometre (2.33 mi) bridge was completed to connect the island to the mainland at Rinku Town, at a cost of $1 billion. Completion of the artificial island increased the area of Osaka Prefecture just enough so that it is no longer the smallest prefecture in Japan (Kagawa Prefecture is now the smallest).

The bidding and construction of the airport was a source of international trade friction during the late 1980s and early 1990s. Prime Minister Yasuhiro Nakasone responded to American concerns, particularly from Senator Frank Murkowski, that bids would be rigged in Japanese companies' favour by providing special offices for prospective international contractors, which ultimately did little to ease the participation of foreign contractors in the bidding process. Later, foreign airlines complained that two-thirds of the departure hall counter space had been allocated to Japanese carriers, disproportionately to the actual carriage of passengers through the airport.

The island had been predicted to sink 5.7 m (18 ft 8 in) by the most optimistic estimate as the weight of the material used for construction compressed the seabed silts. However, by 1999, the island had sunk 8.2 m (26 ft 11 in) – almost 50% more than predicted. The project became the most expensive civil works project in modern history after twenty years of planning, three years of construction and US$15bn of investment. Much of what was learned went into the successful artificial islands in silt deposits for New Kitakyushu Airport, Kobe Airport, and Chubu Centrair International Airport. The lessons of Kansai Airport were also applied in the construction of Hong Kong International Airport.

In 1991, the terminal construction commenced. To compensate for the sinking of the island, adjustable columns were designed to support the terminal building. These are extended by inserting thick metal plates at their bases. Government officials proposed reducing the length of the terminal to cut costs, but architect Renzo Piano insisted on keeping the terminal at its full planned length.

The airport's opening date was decided by the Ministry of Transportation in 1993, mainly to avoid confusion among airlines, airports, and travelers during the peak July-August travel season.

The construction of Kansai International Airport received much attention from local newspapers, particularly Osaka editions of major national newspapers, than those of Tokyo.

Just before the airport was opened, the Ministry of Transportation approved the landing fee for its international flights at 2400 yen a tonne.

The airport was opened on 4 September 1994, being the first in Japan to operate 24 hours a day. Over 31 airlines from 26 countries operate at the new airport.

Within two weeks after its opening, the airport was reported to have had a "poor start": travel agencies in Tokyo were not interested in using the airport for their packages as the number of international flights was fewer than at Narita; one member of a travel agency said that the airport had no major advantage over the one in Narita and another said that the airport being "no better than a local airport". The airport also had problems with flight timetables.

On 17 January 1995, Japan was struck by the Great Hanshin earthquake, the epicenter of which was about 20 km (12 mi) away from KIX and killed 6,434 people on Japan's main island of Honshū. Its earthquake engineering, particularly the use of sliding joints, allowed the airport to emerge unscathed. Even the glass in the windows remained intact. On 22 September 1998, the airport survived a typhoon with wind speeds over 60 m/s (130 mph).

On 19 April 2001, the airport was one of ten structures given the "Civil Engineering Monument of the Millennium" award by the American Society of Civil Engineers.

As of 2008, the total cost of Kansai Airport was $20 billion including land reclamation, two runways, terminals, and facilities. Most additional costs were initially due to the island's sinking, caused by the soft soils of Osaka Bay, which was anticipated by designers. The sink rate fell from 50 cm (20 in) per year during 1994 to 7 cm (3 in) per year in 2008.

=== Operation ===
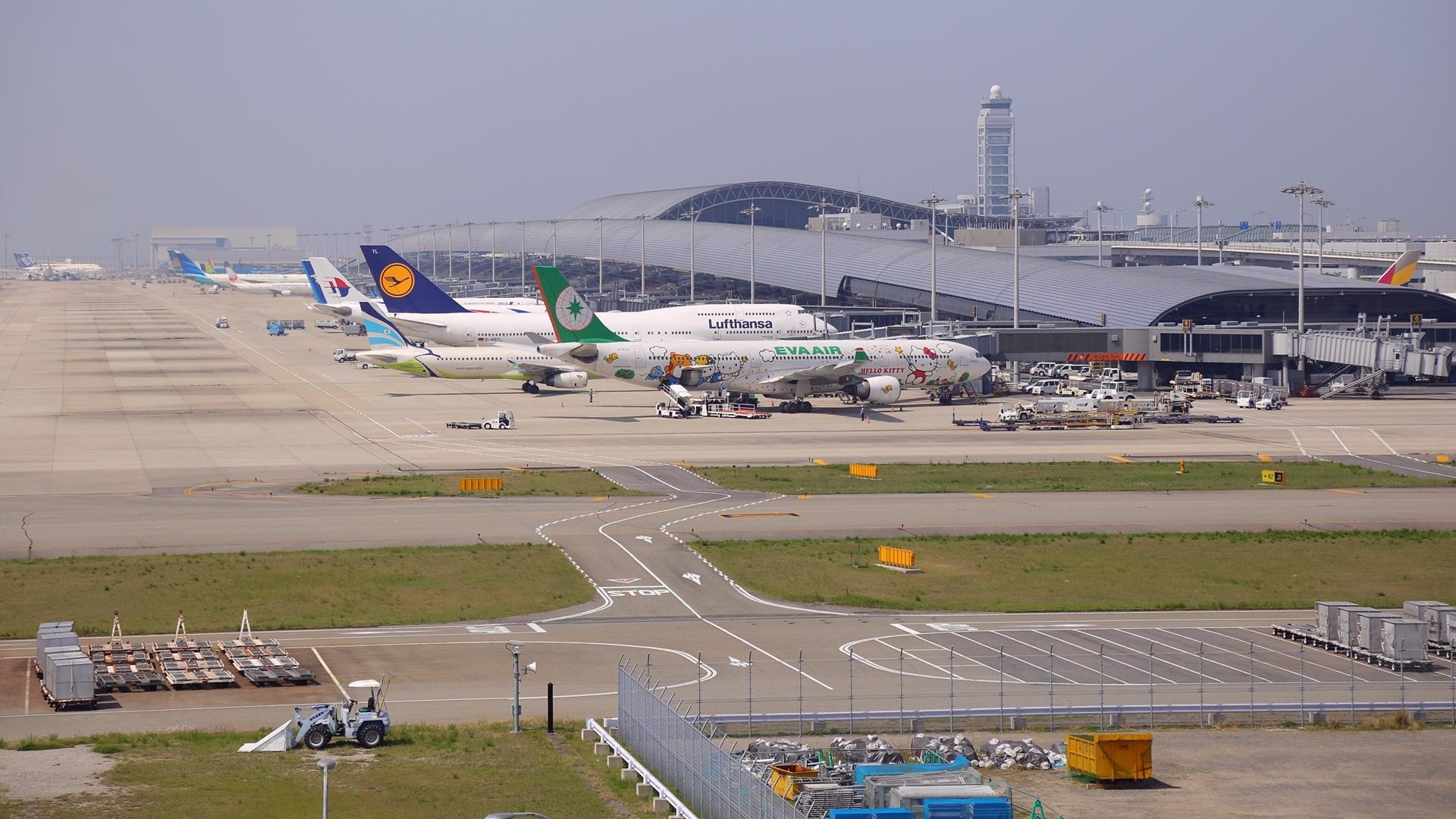
Kansai International Airport with the terminal building in the background

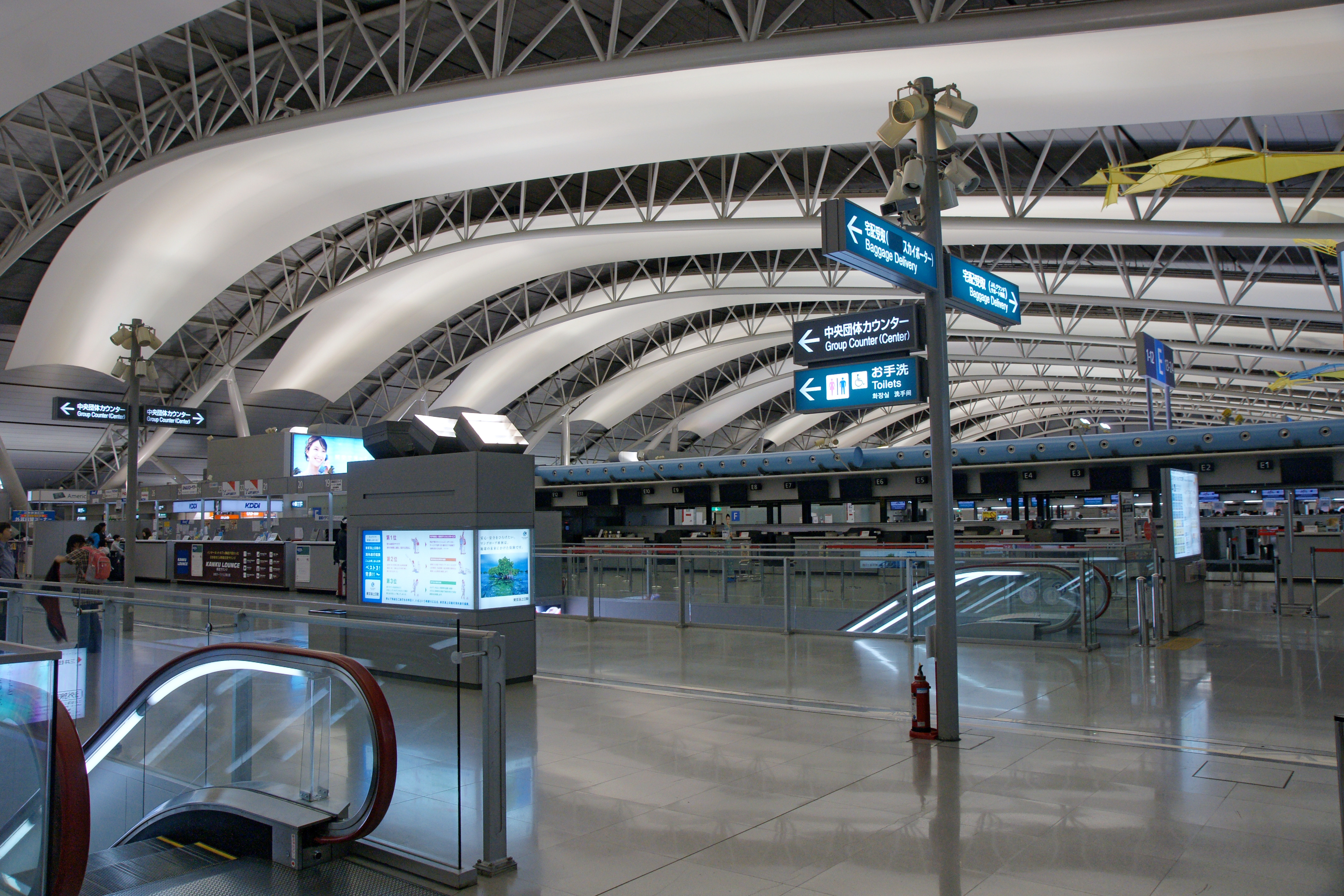
4th floor ticketing hall, illustrating the terminal's airfoil roof

Opened on 4 September 1994, the airport serves as a hub for several airlines such as All Nippon Airways, Japan Airlines, and Nippon Cargo Airlines. It is the international gateway for Japan's Kansai region, which contains the major cities of Kyoto, Kobe, and Osaka. Other Kansai domestic flights fly from the older but more conveniently located Osaka International Airport in Itami, or from the newer Kobe Airport.

The airport had been deeply in debt, losing $560 million in interest every year. Airlines had been kept away by high landing fees (about $7,500 for a Boeing 747), the second most expensive in the world after Narita's. In the early years of the airport's operation, excessive terminal rent and utility bills for on-site concessions also drove up operating costs: some estimates before opening held that a cup of coffee would have to cost US$10. Osaka business owners pressed the government to take a greater burden of the construction cost to keep the airport attractive to passengers and airlines.

On 17 February 2005, Chubu Centrair International Airport opened in Nagoya, east of Osaka. The opening of the airport was expected to increase competition between Japan's international airports. Despite this, passenger totals were up 11% in 2005 over 2004, and international passengers increased to 3.06 million in 2006, up 10% over 2005. Adding to the competition were the opening of Kobe Airport, less than 25 km (16 mi) away, in 2006 and the lengthening of the runway at Tokushima Airport in Shikoku in 2007. The main rationale behind the expansions was to compete with Incheon International Airport and Hong Kong International Airport as a gateway to Asia, as Tokyo area airports were severely congested. Kansai saw a 5% year-on-year increase in international traffic in summer 2013, largely supported by low-cost carrier traffic to Taiwan and Southeast Asia overcoming a decrease in traffic to China and South Korea.

The airport authority was allotted four billion yen in government support for fiscal year 2013, and the Ministry of Land, Infrastructure, and Transport and the Ministry of Finance agreed to reduce this amount in stages through fiscal year 2015, although local governments in the Kansai region have pressed for continued subsidies.

Kansai has been marketed as an alternative to Narita Airport for international travelers from the Greater Tokyo Area. By flying to Kansai from Haneda Airport and connecting to international flights there, travelers can save the additional time required to get to Narita: up to one and a half hours for many residents of Kanagawa Prefecture and southern Tokyo.

=== Expansion ===
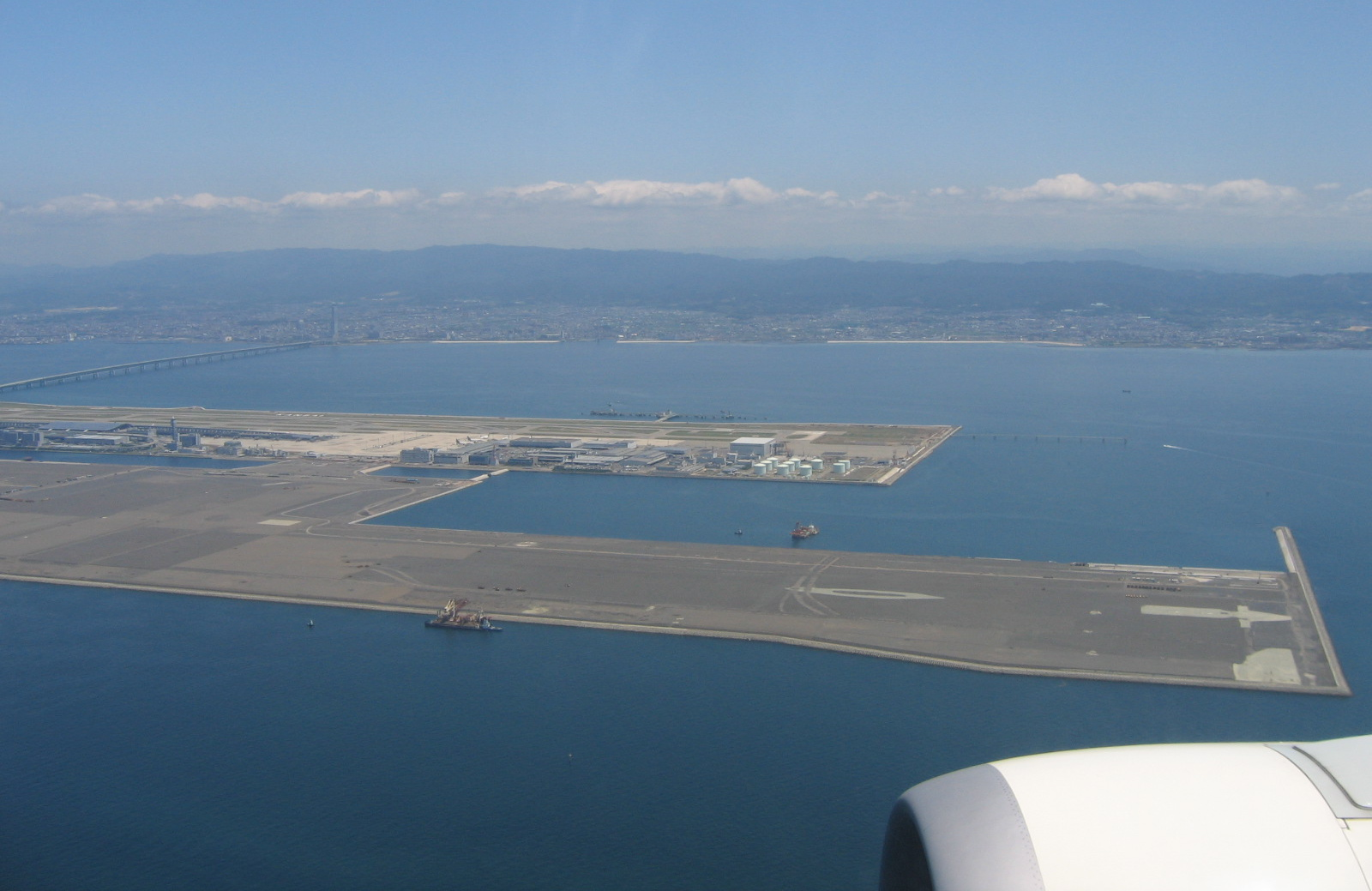
Second phase of Kansai International Airport under construction

The airport was at its limit during peak times, owing especially to freight flights, so a portion of Phase II expansion—the second runway—was made a priority. Thus, in 2002, believing that the sinking problem was almost over, the airport operators started to construct a 4 km (2.5 mi) second runway and terminal.

The second runway opened on 2 August 2007, but with the originally planned terminal portion postponed. This lowered the project cost to JPY¥910 billion (approx. US$8 billion), saving ¥650 billion from the first estimate. The additional runway development, which was opened in time for the IAAF World Athletics Championships in Osaka, has expanded the airport size to 10.5 square kilometres (2,600 acres). The second runway is used for landings and when there are incidents prohibiting takeoff from runway A. The new runway allowed the airport to start 24-hour operations in September 2007.

A new terminal building opened in late 2012. Additional proposals have included new aprons, a third runway (06C/24C) with a length of 3.5 km (2 mi), a new cargo terminal, and expansion of the airport site to 13 km^{2} (5 sq mi); these plans were postponed because of funding constraints.

=== Relationship with Itami Airport ===
Former Osaka Prefecture governor Toru Hashimoto has been a vocal critic of Itami Airport, arguing that the Chuo Shinkansen maglev line will make much of its domestic role irrelevant, and that its domestic functions should be transferred to Kansai Airport in conjunction with upgraded high-speed access to Kansai from central Osaka. In 2009, Hashimoto also publicly proposed moving the functions of Marine Corps Air Station Futenma to Kansai Airport as a possible solution for the political crisis surrounding the base.

In May 2011, the Diet of Japan passed legislation to form a new Kansai International Airport Corporation using the state's existing equity stake in Kansai Airport and its property holdings at Itami Airport. The move was aimed at offsetting Kansai Airport's debt burden.

The merger of the Itami and Kansai airport authorities was completed in July 2012. Shortly following the merger, Kansai Airport announced a 5% reduction in landing fees effective October 2012, with additional reductions during overnight hours when the airport is underutilized, and further discounts planned for the future, including subsidies for new airlines and routes. As of October 2012 these moves were intended to bring Kansai's fees closer to the level of Narita International Airport, where landing fees were around 20% lower than Kansai's, and to improve competitiveness with other Asian hubs such as Incheon International Airport in South Korea.

Since its formation, the new operating company has also made efforts toward international expansion, bidding for operating concessions at Yangon International Airport and Hanthawaddy International Airport in Myanmar.

KIAC conducted a public tender to sell the operating rights for Kansai and Itami Airport in May 2015. Orix and Vinci Airports were the sole bidders for the 45-year contract, at a price of around $18 billion. The new operating company, Kansai Airports, took over on 1 April 2016. It is 80% owned by Orix and Vinci, with the remaining 20% owned by Kansai-based enterprises such as Hankyu Hanshin Holdings and Panasonic.

=== Typhoon Jebi ===
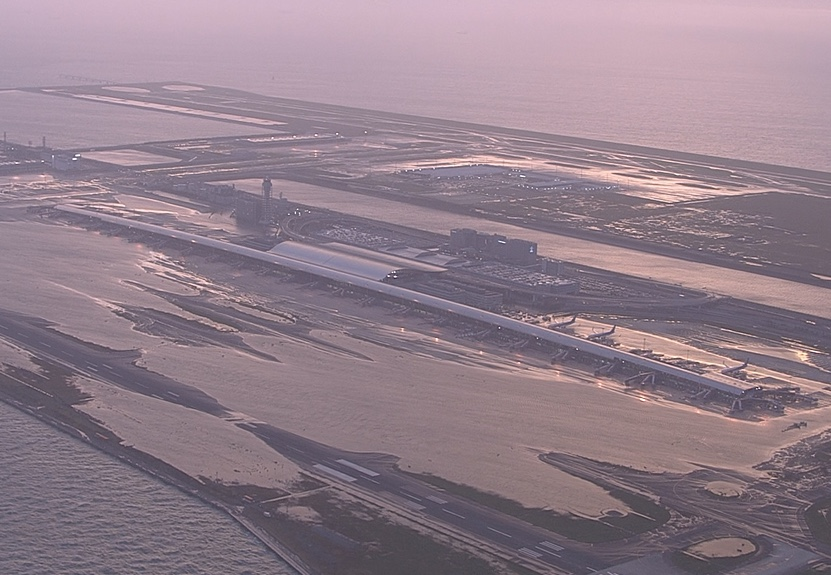
The airport, flooded by Typhoon Jebi

On 4 September 2018, the airport was hit by Typhoon Jebi. The airport had to pause operations after seawater surges inundated the island; runways were hit, and the water reached up to the engines of some aircraft. The situation was further exacerbated when a large tanker crashed into the bridge that links the airport to the mainland, effectively stranding the people remaining at the airport. All flights at the airport were canceled until 6 September, at which date Prime Minister Shinzō Abe announced the airport would partially resume domestic operations.

Train services to the airport resumed from 18 September 2018 after repair works to the Kansai Airport Line and Nankai Airport Line were completed, and the airport resumed regular operations on 1 October 2018. Repairs to the damaged section of the Sky Gate Bridge R were finally completed on 8 April 2019, restoring traffic both to and from the mainland completely.

== Terminals ==
=== Terminal 1 ===
The main KIX passenger terminal, Terminal 1, is a single four-storey building designed by Renzo Piano Building Workshop (Renzo Piano and Noriaki Okabe), and has a gross floor space of 296,043 square metres (3,186,580 sq ft). As of 2018, at a total length of 1.7 km (1.1 mi) from end to end, Terminal 1 is the longest airport terminal in the world. It has a people mover system called the Wing Shuttle, which moves passengers from one end of the pier to the other.

The terminal's roof is shaped like an airfoil. This shape is used to promote air circulation through the building: giant air conditioning ducts blow air upwards at one side of the terminal, circulate the air across the curvature of the ceiling, and collect the air through intakes at the other side. Mobiles are suspended in the ticketing hall to take advantage of the flowing air.

The ticketing hall overlooks the international departures concourse, and the two are separated by a glass partition. During Kansai's early days, visitors were known to throw objects over the partition to friends in the corridor below. The partition was eventually modified to halt this practice.

On 23 June 2017, at the terminal's promotion space, a game experience area known as "Nintendo Check In" opened. In this game experience area, guests arriving at Terminal 1 can play Nintendo Switch games free of charge. There is a statue of Mario at the experience area, along with Super Mario Cappy caps from Super Mario Odyssey for passengers to take photos with. Amiibo figurines are also displayed there. In the northern and southern arrival routes of Terminal 1, there are decorations of Nintendo characters like Mario, Luigi, Princess Peach, and others welcoming arriving passengers.

A large-scale renovation of Terminal 1's post-security international departure area was completed in winter 2023.

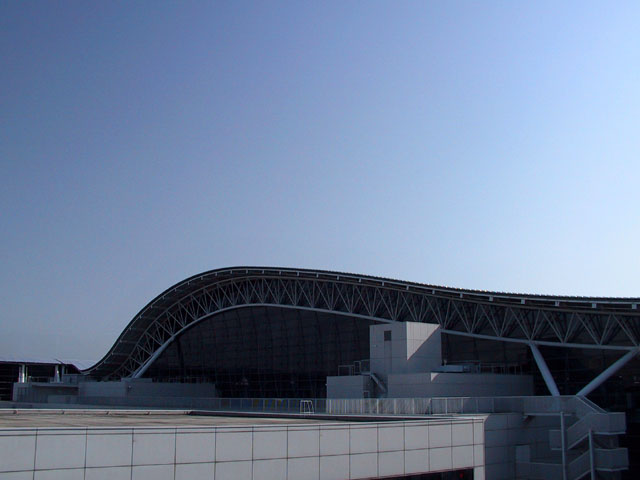
Kansai International Airport's roof

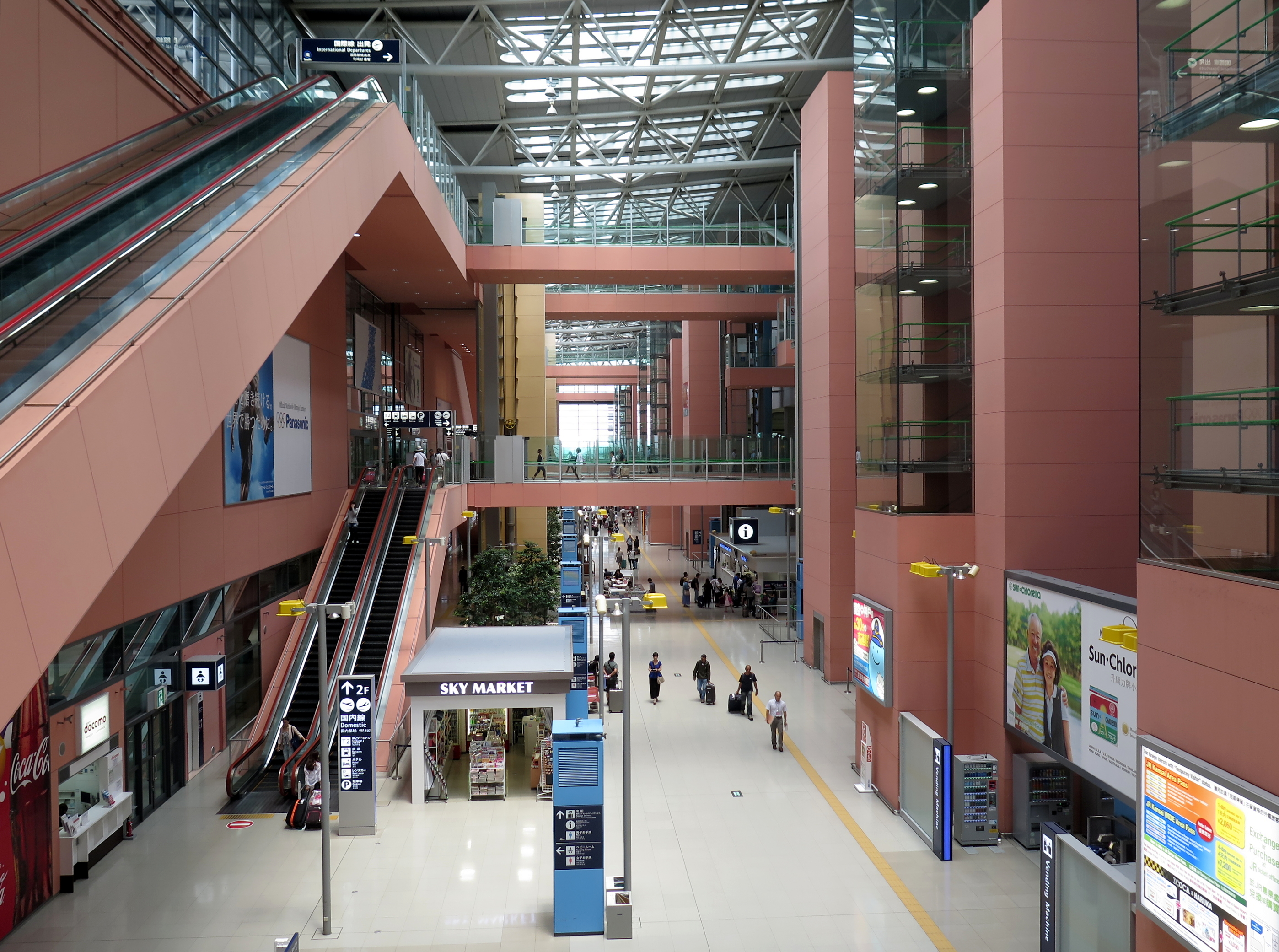
Terminal 1 interior escalator

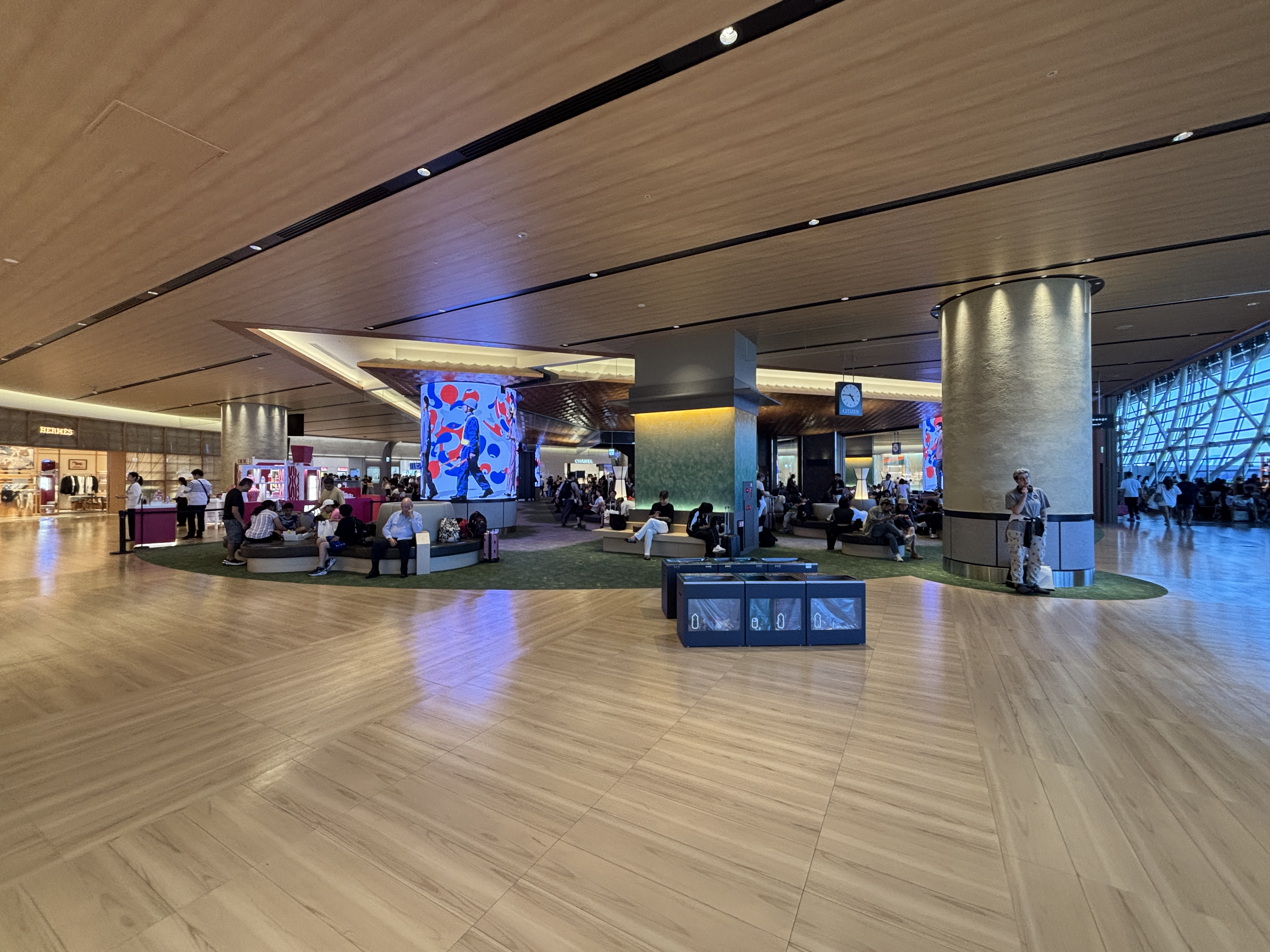
Rest area after Security Inspection (International Flights)

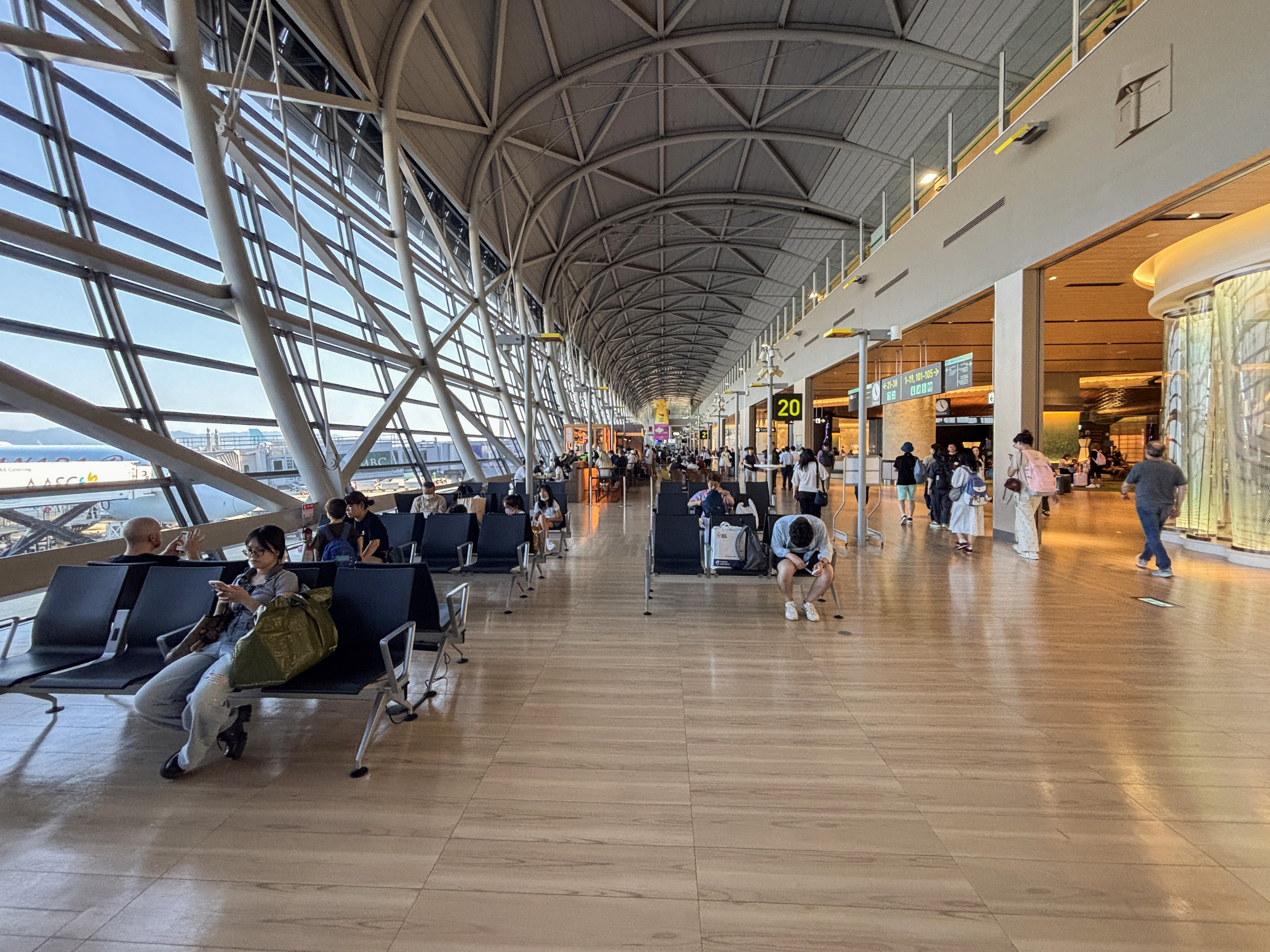
Second floor boarding lobby, within the longest airport terminal in the world

=== Terminal 2 ===
Terminal 2 is a low-cost carrier (LCC) terminal designed to attract more LCCs by providing lower landing fees than Terminal 1. It is exclusively occupied by Peach, Spring Airlines, and Jeju Air. Other LCCs serving Kansai, such as Jetstar, Jetstar Japan, and Cebu Pacific, use the main Terminal 1.

Peach requested that Terminal 2 have a simplified design in order to minimize operating costs. The terminal is a single-story building, thus eliminating the cost of elevators. Passageways to aircraft have no air conditioning. The terminal also has no jet bridges, having one boarding gate for domestic departures and one boarding gate for international departures. In case of rain, passengers are lent umbrellas to use as they walk to the aircraft.

Terminal 2 is not directly connected to Terminal 1 or to Kansai Airport Station. Free shuttle buses run between the two terminals, and between Terminal 2 and the railway and ferry stations. It is also possible to walk between the terminals through the KIX Sora Park, a four-hectare park located adjacent to Terminal 2.

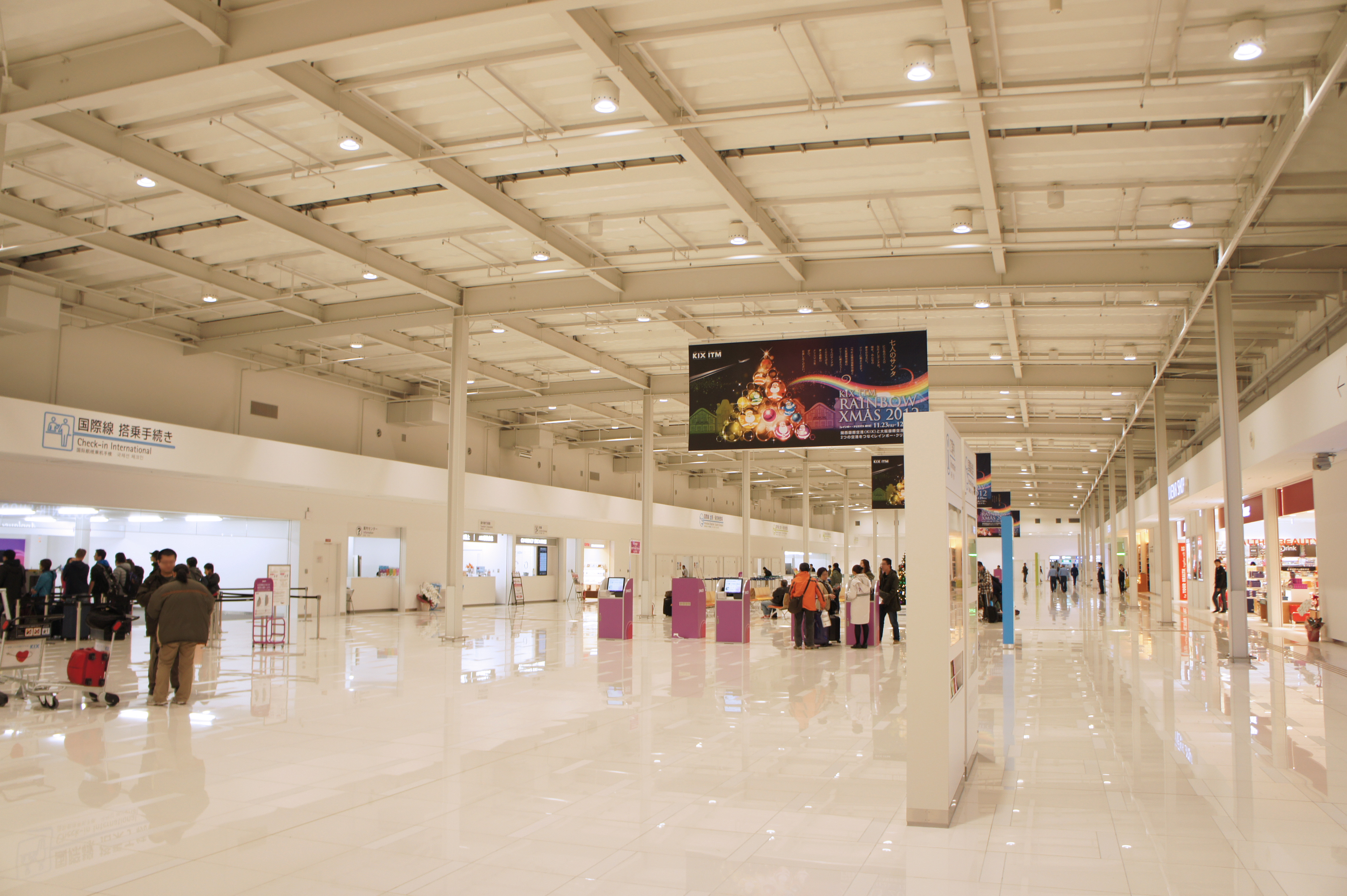
Terminal 2 departures lobby

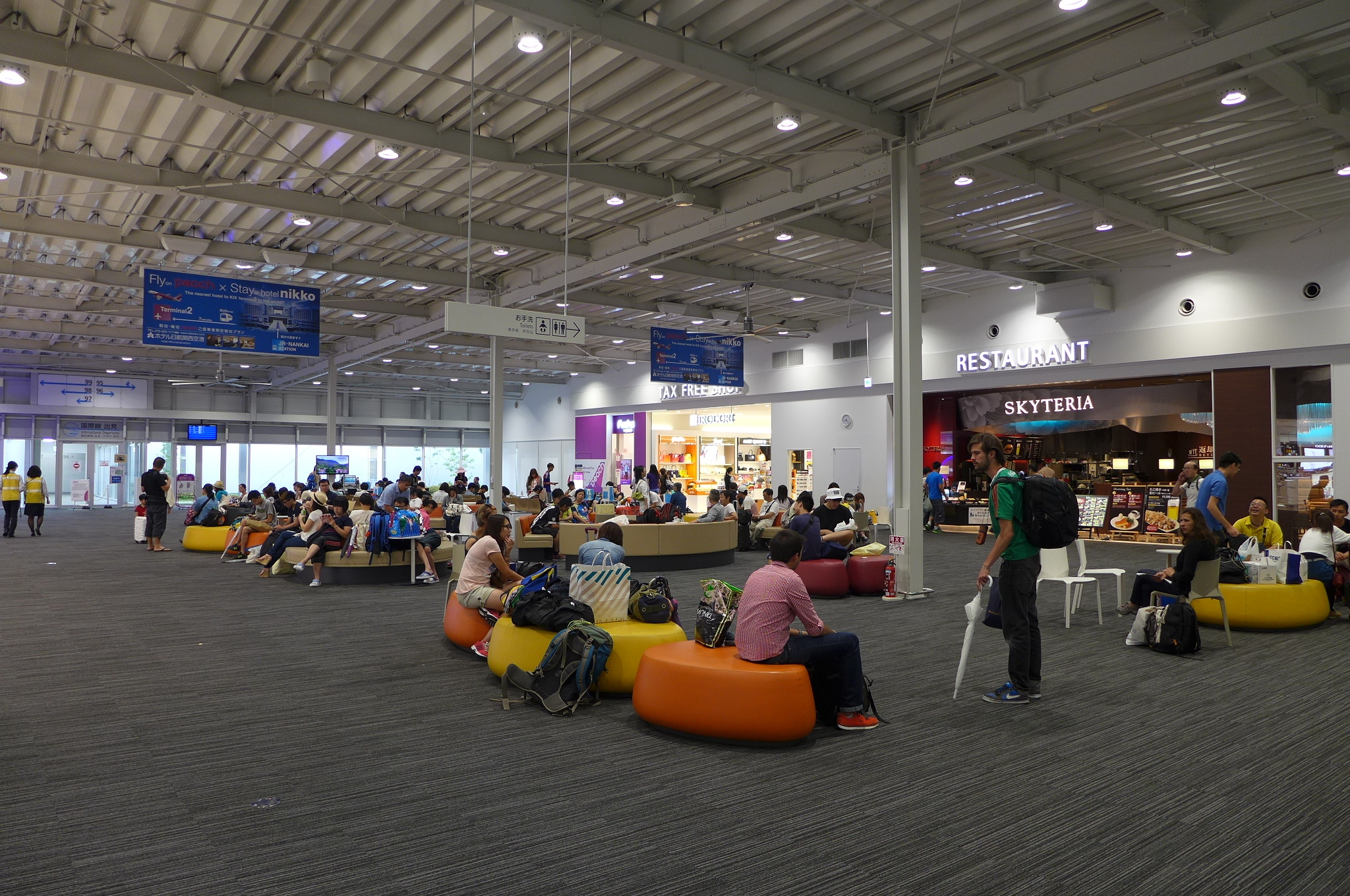
Terminal 2 restricted area shops

== Airlines and destinations ==
=== Passengers ===
| Airlines | Destinations |
|---|---|
| 9 Air | Guangzhou |
| Aero K | Cheongju |
| Air Busan | Busan, Seoul–Incheon |
| Air Canada | Seasonal: Toronto–Pearson, Vancouver |
| Air China | Beijing–Capital, Hangzhou, Shanghai–Pudong |
| Air France | Paris–Charles de Gaulle |
| Air India | Delhi–Indira Gandhi (begins 2 February 2027) |
| Air Macau | Macau |
| Air Seoul | Seoul–Incheon |
| AirAsia | Bangkok–Don Mueang, Kaohsiung, Kuala Lumpur–International |
| AirAsia X | Kuala Lumpur–International, Taipei–Taoyuan |
| All Nippon Airways | Beijing–Capital, Ishigaki, Miyako, Naha, Sapporo–Chitose, Shanghai–Pudong, Tokyo–Haneda |
| Asiana Airlines | Seoul–Gimpo, Seoul–Incheon (both end 17 December 2026) |
| Batik Air Malaysia | Kuala Lumpur–International; Seasonal charter: Kota Kinabalu |
| Beijing Capital Airlines | Hangzhou |
| Cathay Pacific | Hong Kong, Taipei–Taoyuan |
| Cebu Pacific | Cebu |
| China Airlines | Kaohsiung, Taipei–Taoyuan |
| China Eastern Airlines | Shanghai–Pudong |
| China Southern Airlines | Guangzhou |
| Eastar Jet | Busan, Seoul–Incheon |
| Emirates | Dubai–International |
| Etihad Airways | Seasonal: Abu Dhabi |
| EVA Air | Kaohsiung, Taipei–Taoyuan |
| Finnair | Helsinki |
| Greater Bay Airlines | Hong Kong |
| Hainan Airlines | Beijing–Capital |
| Hawaiian Airlines | Honolulu, Seattle/Tacoma (begins 15 May 2027) |
| HK Express | Hong Kong |
| Hong Kong Airlines | Hong Kong |
| Japan Airlines | Bangkok–Suvarnabhumi, Honolulu, Los Angeles, Sapporo–Chitose, Shanghai–Pudong, Taipei–Taoyuan, Tokyo–Haneda |
| Japan Transocean Air | Ishigaki, Miyako, Naha |
| Jeju Air | Busan, Seoul–Incheon |
| Jetstar | Brisbane, Cairns, Sydney–Kingsford Smith |
| Jetstar Japan | Manila, Naha, Sapporo–Chitose, Taipei–Taoyuan, Tokyo–Narita |
| Jin Air | Busan, Seoul–Incheon |
| Juneyao Air | Nanjing, Shanghai–Pudong |
| KLM | Amsterdam |
| Korean Air | Seoul–Gimpo, Seoul–Incheon |
| Loong Air | Hangzhou |
| Lufthansa | Munich |
| Malaysia Airlines | Kuala Lumpur–International |
| MIAT Mongolian Airlines | Ulaanbaatar |
| Parata Air | Seoul–Incheon |
| Peach | Amami Oshima, Bangkok–Suvarnabhumi, Fukuoka, Hong Kong, Ishigaki, Kagoshima, Kaohsiung, Kushiro, Memanbetsu, Miyazaki, Nagasaki, Naha, Sapporo–Chitose, Sendai, Seoul–Gimpo, Seoul–Incheon, Shanghai–Pudong, Singapore, Taipei–Taoyuan, Tokyo–Narita |
| Philippine Airlines | Cebu, Manila |
| Qatar Airways | Doha |
| Qingdao Airlines | Qingdao |
| Scoot | Singapore |
| Shandong Airlines | Jinan, Qingdao |
| Shanghai Airlines | Shanghai–Pudong |
| Shenzhen Airlines | Shenzhen, Wuxi |
| Singapore Airlines | Singapore |
| Spring Airlines | Shanghai–Pudong |
| StarFlyer | Tokyo–Haneda |
| Starlux Airlines | Taipei–Taoyuan |
| Thai AirAsia X | Bangkok–Don Mueang |
| Thai Airways International | Bangkok–Suvarnabhumi |
| Thai Lion Air | Taipei–Taoyuan |
| Thai VietJet Air | Bangkok–Suvarnabhumi, Chiang Mai, Taipei–Taoyuan |
| Tianjin Airlines | Tianjin |
| Tigerair Taiwan | Kaohsiung, Taipei–Taoyuan |
| Trinity Airways | Busan, Cheongju, Daegu, Guam, Jeju, Seoul–Incheon |
| Turkish Airlines | Istanbul |
| United Airlines | Guam, Los Angeles (resumes 28 March 2027), San Francisco |
| VietJet Air | Hanoi, Ho Chi Minh City |
| Vietnam Airlines | Da Nang, Hanoi, Ho Chi Minh City |

== Ground transportation ==
=== Rail ===
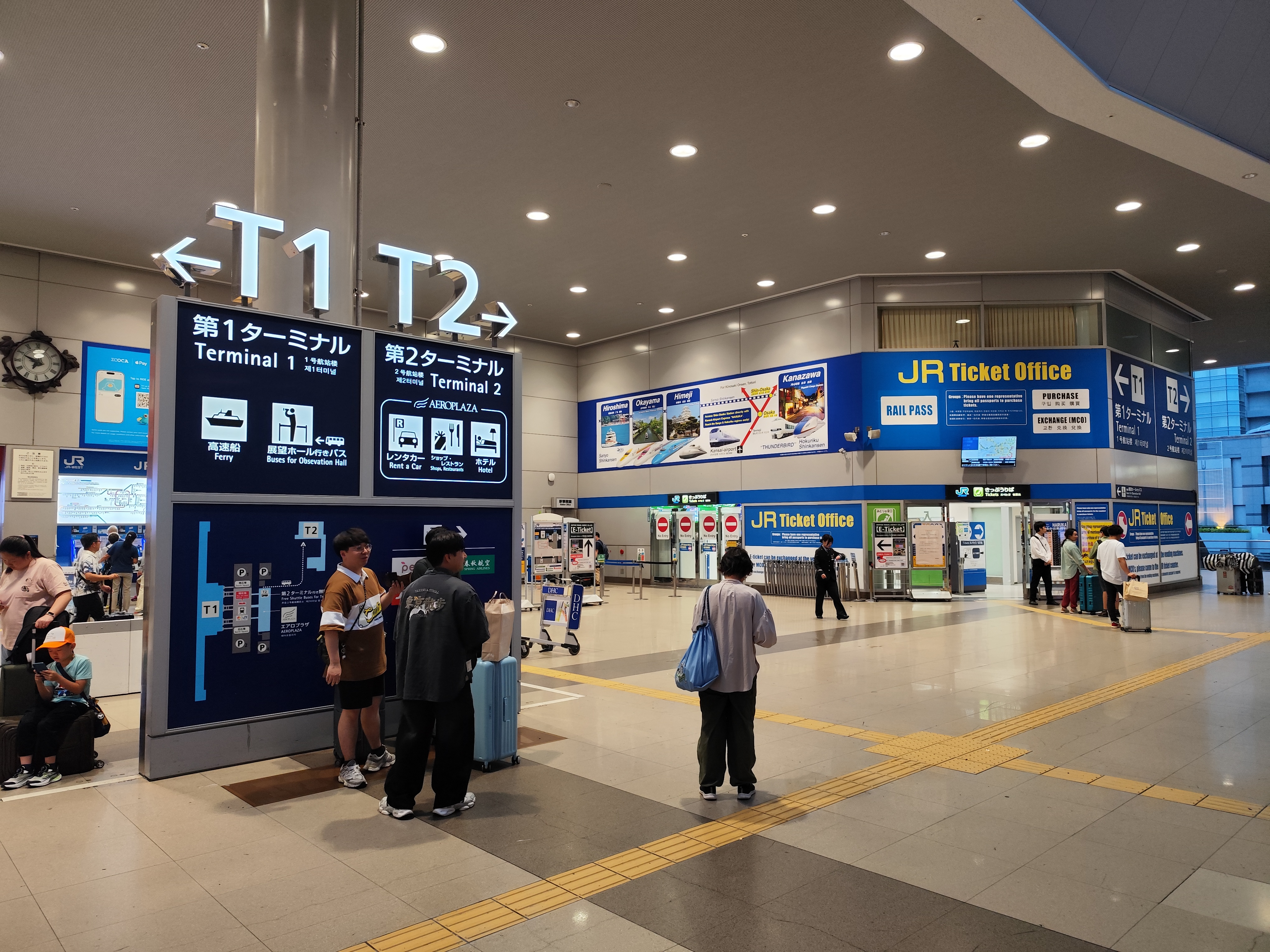
Kansai Airport Station

Kansai International Airport is served by Kansai Airport Station. Rail connections to and from Kansai Airport are expected to further improve access to and from Umeda with the opening of the Naniwasuji Line in 2031.

=== Bus ===
Kansai Airport Transportation Enterprise offers scheduled express bus services, called "Airport Limousines", for Kansai International Airport.

== See also ==
- Kansai Airports
- Itami Airport
