= Denver Law Review =

- Discipline: Legal studies
- Language: English
- Edited by: Kailey Houck

Publication details
- Former names: Denver Bar Association Record, Dicta, Denver Law Center Journal, Denver University Law Review
- History: 1923–present
- Publisher: University of Denver Sturm College of Law (United States)

Standard abbreviations
- Bluebook: Denv. L. Rev.
- ISO 4: Denver Law Rev.

Indexing
- ISSN: 0883-9409

Links
- Journal homepage

The Denver Law Review is a law journal published by the students of the University of Denver Sturm College of Law. It was established in 1923 as the Denver Bar Association Record. In 1928, the journal was renamed Dicta and in 1968 it was renamed Denver Law Center Journal. The journal changed its name to Denver University Law Review in 1985. It adopted its current name in 2015. The College of Law began co-publishing the law review in 1949 and became the sole publisher in 1966. The Denver Law Review has proudly featured distinguished authors such as U.S. Supreme Court Justices Sandra Day O'Connor, William O. Douglas, and Byron White, noted constitutional law scholar Erwin Chemerinsky, and consumer advocate Ralph Nader.

The Denver Law Review publishes four issues in its print version each year. The Denver Law Review Forum is the online supplement to the Denver Law Review, which publishes shorter, more timely pieces as well as podcasts.

== Candidacy ==
Like many law schools' law reviews and journals, first-year day and first and second-year night students may attempt to "write on" to the Denver University Law Review during its sole spring candidacy period. Traditional students must complete candidacy at the end of first year finals. Transfer students may attempt to write on immediately before the fall semester. Students who successfully join the law review have publication opportunities and take part in the law review's editing and publication process. Candidacy consists of a written case comment, a written leadership exercise, and a Bluebook editing exercise.

== Issues ==
The Denver Law Review publishes four issues annually. Two of the issues contain articles of general legal interest, while one of the issues focuses exclusively on the law of the Tenth Circuit. The Tenth Circuit issue has featured pieces from Judges Timothy Tymkovich, Michael W. McConnell, and Marcia Krieger, as well as prominent scholars such as Dave Kopel and Marc Falkoff. The fourth issue contains articles drawn from the Denver Law Review’s annual symposium. In 2008, the Denver Law Review also published a special fifth issue discussing the historic 2008 Presidential Campaign and the election of President Barack Obama.
