= Transportation Law Journal =

- Discipline: Transportation law
- Language: English

Publication details
- History: 1969-present
- Publisher: Sturm College of Law, University of Denver (United States)
- Frequency: Biannually

Standard abbreviations
- Bluebook: Transp. L.J.
- ISO 4: Transp. Law J.

Indexing
- ISSN: 0049-450X
- LCCN: 78026689
- OCLC no.: 53126493

Links
- Journal homepage; Online archives

The Transportation Law Journal is a biannual law review covering the field of transportation law. It covers domestic as well as international developments of legal, regulatory, economic, and political interest in all modes of transportation - pipelines, freight forwarders, brokers, and air, motor, rail, and water carriage. The journal is published by the University of Denver Sturm College of Law and was established in 1969.
