= Mizel Museum =

- Location: 400 S Kearney St, Denver, Colorado 80224
- Coordinates: 39°42′33″N 104°55′2″W
- Website: mizelmuseum.org

Mizel Museum is a Jewish history museum located in Denver, Colorado, The museum is a part of The Mizel Institute and Lion Global Foundation. It was founded by Rabbi Stanley Wagner with philanthropists Carol and Larry Mizel in 1982. According to Larry, "The museum is really designed to be an outreach to the broader community, and our focal point has been bridges of understanding, which is bringing people together of different races and different religions, to show mostly younger people in school what they have similar with each other."

The Mizel Museum is a Jewish history museum with cultural and artistic content, including digital presentations. Its main exhibits are "4,000 Year Road Trip: Gathering Sparks" and, beginning in 2014, "The Power of Place". It also has exhibits about The Holocaust (1941–1945).

Its subsidiary, Center for Empowered Learning and Living" (CELL), is a non-profit organization that promotes anti-terrorism efforts and educates the public about the risk of terrorism around the world.
