= MDC Holdings =

American home builder

- Type: Subsidiary
- Traded as: NYSE: MDC
- Headquarters: Denver, Colorado, U.S.
- Key people: Larry A. Mizel, Executive Chairman; David D. Mandarich, CEO / President
- Parent: Sekisui House
- Website: ir.richmondamerican.com

M.D.C. Holdings, Inc. is an American home construction company with headquarters in Denver, Colorado. The company has operations in Arizona, California, Colorado, Florida, Idaho, Maryland, Nevada, Oregon, Pennsylvania, Tennessee, Texas, Utah, Virginia and Washington. On January 18, 2024, Sekisui House agreed to acquire the company for approximately $5 billion.

== History ==
The company was founded by Larry A. Mizel as Mizel Development Corporation in 1972. The first homebuilding subsidiary began operation in 1977, primarily building single-family homes. The company was ranked 12 on the annual Builder 100 list published by Builder Magazine in 2021.

MDC debuted on the New York Stock Exchange in 1984.

== Affiliate companies ==
MDC's homebuilding subsidiaries construct single-family homes under the name "Richmond American Homes". MDC is also the parent company to mortgage financing through its wholly owned subsidiary HomeAmerican Mortgage Corporation. Other affiliate companies include American Home Insurance Agency, Inc. and American Home Title and Escrow Company.

== Charitable work ==
The MDC/Richmond American Homes Foundation was established in 1999 as a vehicle for charitable giving. Since inception, millions of dollars have been donated to organizations across the United States and abroad. The Foundation restructured in 2016 and is currently a supporting organization of Lion Global Foundation.

Following the September 11 attacks in 2001, MDC, its employees and subcontractors raised $1.1 million for victims. The company was then presented with the Extraordinary Service to Humanity Award in New York in 2003.
