= Sekisui House =

Japanese homebuilder and real estate developer

Sekisui House, Ltd.

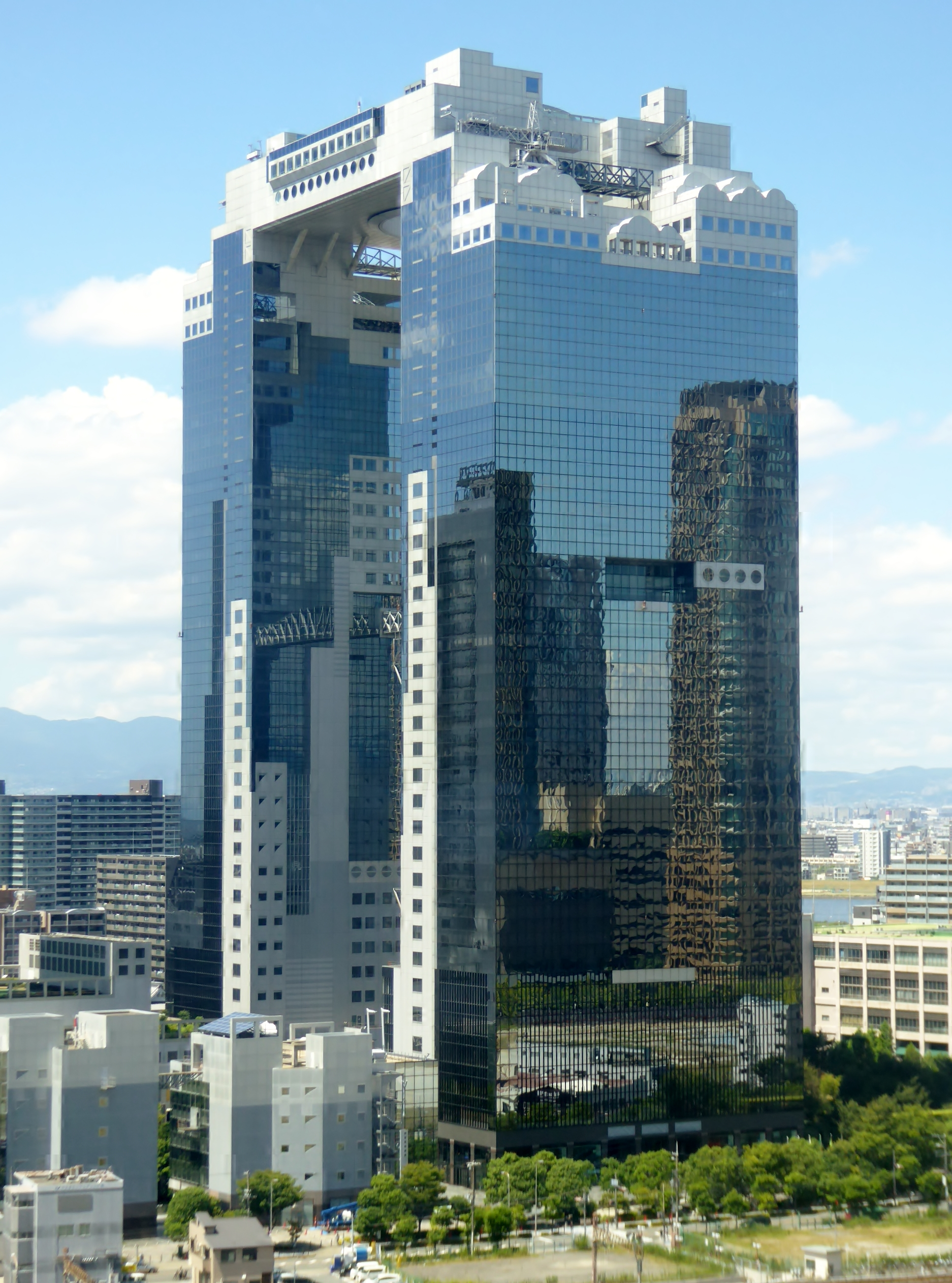
- The Umeda Sky Building, jointly owned by Sekisui House and home to its headquarters
- Native name: 積水ハウス株式会社
- Romanized name: Sekisui Hausu Kabushiki-gaisha
- Formerly: Sekisui House Sangyo Co., Ltd. (1960–1963)
- Type: Public Kabushiki gaisha
- Traded as: TYO: 1928; NSE: 1928; Nikkei 225 component TOPIX 100 component
- Industry: Construction; Real estate
- Founded: 1 August 1960; 66 years ago
- Headquarters: Umeda Sky Building Tower East, Kita-ku, Osaka, Japan
- Area served: Japan, the United States, Australia and Singapore
- Key people: Yoshihiro Nakai (president and CEO)
- Products: Custom-built detached houses; rental housing; condominiums; homes for sale
- Services: Remodeling; property management; real estate development; architectural and civil engineering
- Revenue: ¥4.198 trillion (FY2025)
- Operating income: ¥341.4 billion (FY2025)
- Net income: ¥232.1 billion (FY2025)
- Total assets: ¥5.007 trillion (FY2025)
- Total equity: ¥2.140 trillion (FY2025)
- Number of employees: 32,186 (31 January 2026)
- Website: www.sekisuihouse.co.jp/english/

Sekisui House, Ltd. (積水ハウス株式会社, Sekisui Hausu Kabushiki-gaisha) is a Japanese homebuilder and real estate developer headquartered in Osaka. It was established in 1960 from the housing division of Sekisui Chemical. The company constructs custom-built detached houses, rental housing and condominiums, and also undertakes remodeling, property management, urban development and civil-engineering work. Its custom-house business includes factory-engineered steel-frame systems and SHAWOOD laminated-timber post-and-beam houses.

Sekisui House is listed on the Tokyo Stock Exchange and the Nagoya Stock Exchange and is a constituent of the Nikkei 225 and TOPIX 100. For the fiscal year ended 31 January 2026, which the company designates FY2025, it reported net sales of ¥4.198 trillion. As of that date, the group employed 32,186 people. It had delivered a cumulative 2,749,520 homes.

The company entered the Australian housing market in 2009 and expanded in the United States through a series of acquisitions, including its US$4.9 billion purchase of M.D.C. Holdings in 2024. The combined American operation was named Builder magazine's 2026 Builder of the Year and ranked eighth on that year's Builder 100 list, based on 11,712 home closings in 2025. In Japan, a 2017 fraudulent land transaction caused a loss of approximately ¥5.5 billion (about US$51 million at the time) and led to a dispute over the company's governance.

== History ==
=== Establishment and domestic development ===
Sekisui Chemical entered the housing business in March 1960 and began selling its prefabricated Sekisui House A-type model the following month. On 1 August 1960, the business was spun off as Sekisui House Sangyo Co., Ltd., with capital of ¥100 million. An A-type house was exported to Australia in November of that year. The company adopted its present name in 1963.

Sekisui House was listed on the second sections of the Tokyo and Osaka stock exchanges in 1970, moving to their first sections in 1971, and was listed on the Nagoya Stock Exchange in 1972. It moved its headquarters to the Umeda Sky Building, which it jointly owns, in 1993; its cumulative number of homes built reached one million that year.

In August 1995, the company absorbed Sekisui House Mokuzo Co., Ltd. and concurrently began its SHAWOOD wooden-housing business. The absorbed company had formerly been Toyodo Construction, in which Sekisui House acquired a capital interest in 1984, and had been renamed Sekisui House Mokuzo in 1989. In 2000, it unified its low-rise rental-housing products under the Sha Maison brand.

Sekisui House entered a business alliance with Konoike Construction and a capital alliance with Konoike's parent, Otori Holdings, in 2015. Otori became an equity-method affiliate in 2016 after Sekisui House acquired a 33.3% voting interest. In October 2019, Sekisui House increased the interest to 51.8%, making Otori and Konoike consolidated subsidiaries.

In February 2024, the group reorganized eight domestic construction subsidiaries under the wholly owned intermediate holding company Sekisui House Construction Holdings, Ltd. The parent company transferred the operations of its Construction Business Headquarters to the holding company through an absorption-type company split.

=== International expansion ===
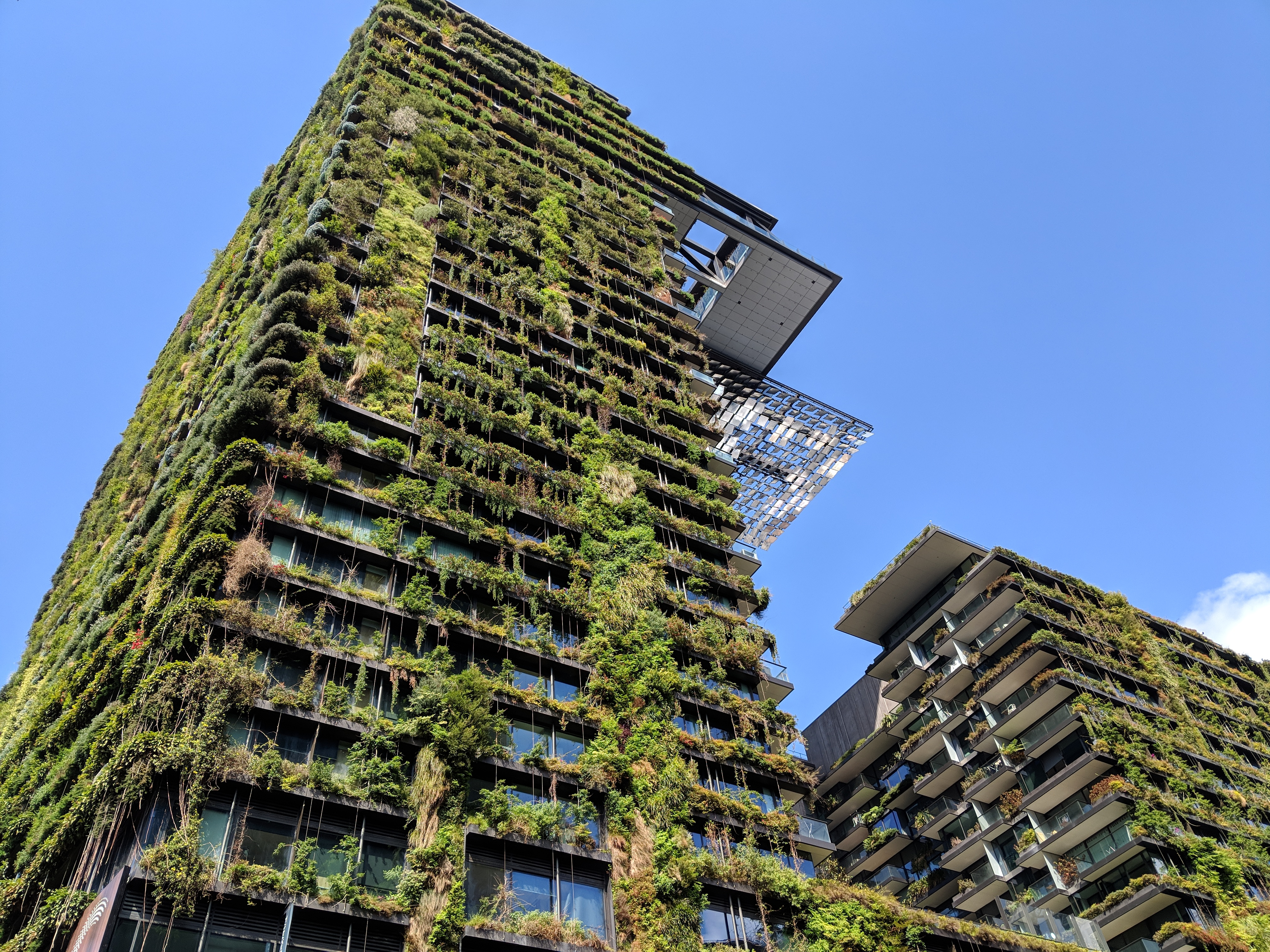
One Central Park in Sydney, part of the Central Park development undertaken by Sekisui House and Frasers Property

Sekisui House announced its entry into the Australian housing market in 2009. In 2010, it purchased the contract-building division of Australian homebuilder and developer AVJennings. In 2011, Sekisui House and Frasers Property formed an equal joint venture to develop the majority of the A$2 billion Central Park mixed-use project in Sydney.

The company reported that by 31 December 2025 it had delivered 14,326 homes in Australia and undertaken projects with an aggregate development value of more than A$18 billion. In 2026, SHINKA House II, a SHAWOOD spec home in southwestern Sydney, received the Housing Industry Association's Australian Spec Home award.

In the United States, Sekisui House began real-estate development projects in 2010 and later expanded into homebuilding. It acquired Woodside Homes in 2017 and made Holt Homes a wholly owned subsidiary in January 2022. It agreed in June 2022 to acquire Chesmar Homes, which became a wholly owned subsidiary the following month, and acquired the homebuilding business and assets of Hubble Homes in 2023.

In January 2024, Sekisui House agreed to acquire M.D.C. Holdings, the parent of Richmond American Homes, for approximately US$4.95 billion in cash. The acquisition was completed in April 2024, making M.D.C. a wholly owned subsidiary. In early 2026, M.D.C. Holdings was rebranded as Sekisui House U.S., while Woodside, Holt and Chesmar were absorbed into a unified organization; Hubble had previously been placed under Woodside. The group's homebuilding portfolio continued to include Richmond American Homes and SHAWOOD.

== Products and operations ==
Sekisui House's domestic operations include custom-built detached houses; rental housing and commercial buildings; architectural and civil engineering; rental-housing management; remodeling; and residential and urban development. Its overseas business consists principally of homebuilding and residential development in the United States and Australia, with additional development activity in Singapore. S&P Global Ratings described the company in 2026 as a leading Japan-based prefabricated homebuilder, estimating annual construction of about 8,000 detached houses and more than 20,000 rental units.

The company's fiscal year ends on 31 January. For FY2025, the year ended 31 January 2026, it reported net sales of ¥4.198 trillion, operating profit of ¥341.4 billion and profit attributable to owners of the parent of ¥232.1 billion.

=== Custom detached houses ===
In Japan, Sekisui House offers custom detached houses through three principal factory-engineered structural systems. Its light-gauge steel Dynamic Frame System, used for one- and two-storey houses, employs reinforced beams to reduce the need for internal columns. Its heavy-gauge steel Flexible β System is used principally for three- and four-storey houses and other buildings where larger openings and flexible layouts are required.

Wooden houses are sold under the SHAWOOD brand. SHAWOOD uses factory-cut laminated-timber posts and beams joined with proprietary metal connectors rather than conventional American light timber framing. Trade publications have noted that the post-and-beam system permits wide openings and open-plan interiors, while factory cutting and numbered components reduce on-site cutting and construction waste. Although the structural components are factory-engineered, the company markets the houses as individually designed rather than restricted to preset floor plans.

Representative domestic product families include the IS series of one- and two-storey steel-frame houses and BIENA three- and four-storey steel-frame houses; wooden houses are marketed under the SHAWOOD name. Proprietary exterior materials include Dyne Concrete panels, developed in 1984 for steel-frame houses, and Bellburn ceramic exterior tiles, developed in 2001 for SHAWOOD houses.

=== Rental housing and development ===
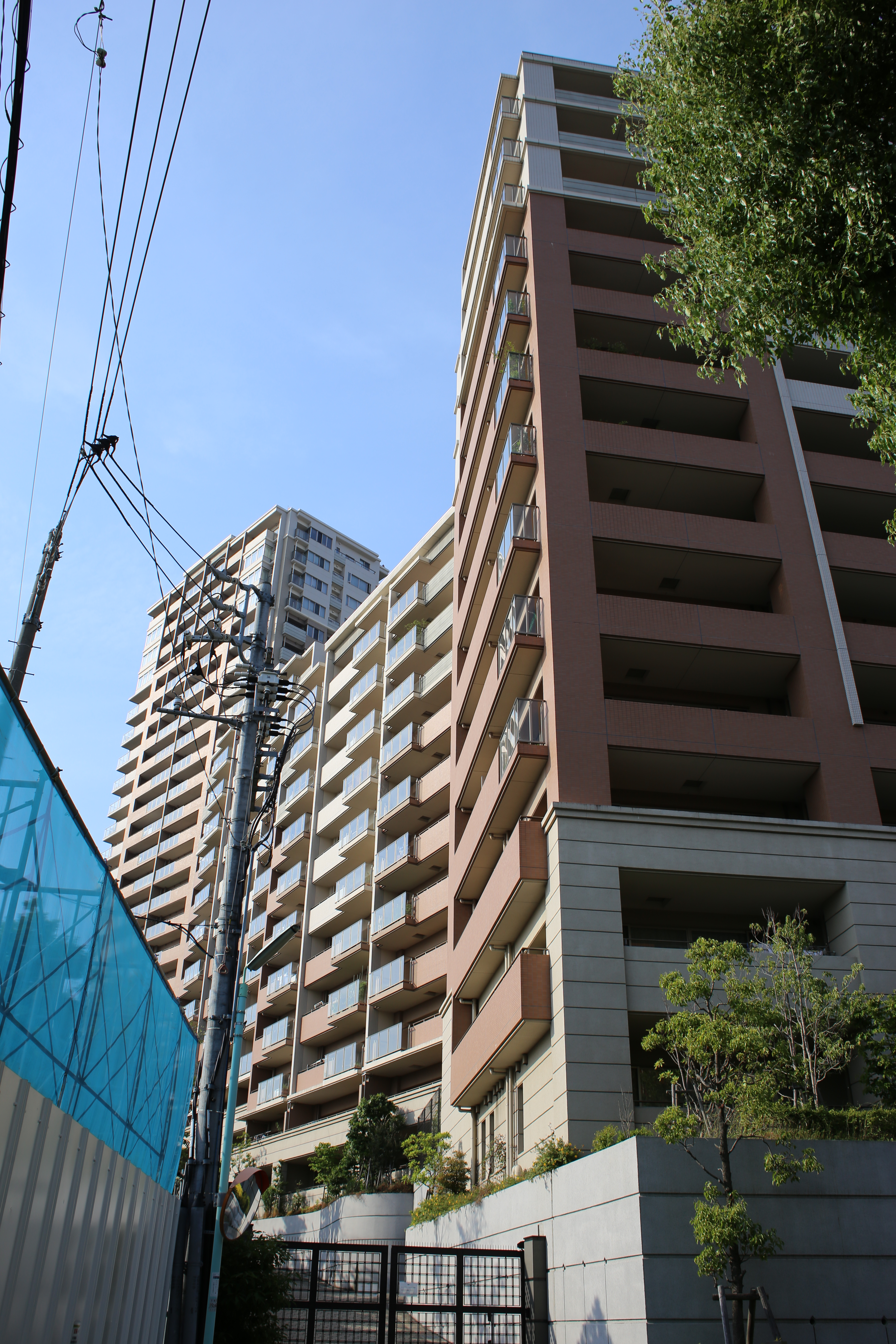
Grande Maison Hoshigaoka-Yamate, a condominium development in Nagoya

The company markets low-rise rental housing under the Sha Maison brand and condominiums under the Grande Maison brand. It is also the sponsor of Sekisui House Reit, a publicly listed Japanese real estate investment trust, through its wholly owned subsidiary Sekisui House Asset Management.

== Reception in the United States ==
The first U.S. demonstration of the SHAWOOD system was the BUILDER Chōwa Concept Home near Las Vegas. The roughly 5,400 sq ft (500 m^{2}) house was designed by KTGY Architecture + Planning and built by Woodside Homes for presentation at the 2020 International Builders' Show. The Journal of Light Construction reported that a six-person local crew, assisted by two Japanese supervisors, erected its factory-cut frame in eight and a half working days without cutting structural members on site. The publication quoted the project's structural engineer as finding that the system provided lateral-load capacity at least equal to U.S. building-code requirements.

American trade publications have subsequently focused on SHAWOOD's precision-manufactured timber connections and its ability to create open-plan interiors. Pro Builder described it in 2025 as a post-and-beam alternative to conventional American light timber framing and noted that its pre-cut components reduced on-site cutting and construction waste. The National Association of Home Builders named SHAWOOD at Sommers Bend its Detached Community of the Year in 2025 and gave the same award to SHAWOOD Folsom in 2026.

Builder named Sekisui House U.S. its 2026 Builder of the Year and ranked it eighth in the Builder 100, reporting 11,712 closings and US$6.44 billion in revenue for 2025. The magazine described SHAWOOD as the group's top-tier U.S. offering. HousingWire reported that, as of July 2026, SHAWOOD was offered in eight communities, while the group's acquired builders, including Richmond American Homes, largely continued to use conventional American construction methods. It attributed the limited adoption of the full SHAWOOD system partly to its higher cost.

== Environmental initiatives ==
Sekisui House introduced its Gohon no Ki ("five trees") landscaping concept in 2001, followed by its energy-efficient Green First homes in 2009 and Green First Zero net-zero-energy houses in 2013. The company reported that 96% of the detached houses it built in Japan during the year from April 2025 through March 2026 were net-zero-energy houses, and that it had built 95,776 such houses cumulatively as of 31 March 2026.

The company joined the RE100 initiative in October 2017. Climate Scorecard reported that it was the second Japanese company to join, after Ricoh; Sekisui House described itself as the first company from the housing industry to participate.

== Workplace policy ==
In 2018, Sekisui House began encouraging male employees with children under the age of three to take at least one month of childcare leave, with the first month fully paid; the program was fully implemented in February 2019. In 2023, the World Economic Forum reported a 100% uptake rate among eligible employees.

== 2017 land fraud and governance dispute ==
In 2017, Sekisui House lost approximately ¥5.5 billion (about US$51 million at the time) in an attempted purchase of a roughly 2,000 m^{2} (22,000 sq ft) site in Gotanda, Tokyo. A woman posing as the owner used a forged passport, and the company's application to register ownership was rejected. Ten people were subsequently prosecuted for offences including fraud and the use of forged documents, and all received guilty verdicts.

The fraud also prompted a governance dispute. At a January 2018 board meeting, then-chairman Isami Wada proposed removing president Toshinori Abe; the motion failed, and Wada subsequently stepped down as chairman. In 2020, Wada and then-director Fumiyasu Suguro proposed a slate of 11 directors, but shareholders rejected the proposal. A shareholder derivative lawsuit seeking damages from two former representative directors was dismissed by the Osaka District Court in May 2022; the Osaka High Court dismissed the shareholder's appeal that December. The case received renewed international attention after the 2024 release of the Netflix drama series Tokyo Swindlers, whose fictional story was widely associated with the fraud.
