= List of justices of the Colorado Supreme Court =

Coordinates: 38.9972°N 105.5478°W

The location of the State of Colorado in the United States of America.

The Colorado Supreme Court currently consists of a chief justice and six associate justices. From the court's formation until 1905, it had three members. Following is a list of justices of the Colorado Supreme Court.

== Justices ==
Judge	Began active service	Ended active service	Begin chief justice service	Ended chief justice service
Benjamin F. Hall	1861	1863	1861	1863
Charles Lee Armour	1861	1865		
S. Newton Pettis	1861	1862		
Allen Alexander Bradford	1862	1865		
Stephen S. Harding	1863	1865	1863	1865
Charles Frederick Holly	1865	1866		
William H. Gale	1865	1866		
William R. Gorsline	1866	1870		
Christian S. Eyster	1866	1871		
Moses Hallett	1866	1877		
James B. Belford	1870	1875		
Ebenezer T. Wells	1871	1875		
Andrew W. Brazee	1875	1876		
Amherst W. Stone	1875	1876		
Henry Calvin Thatcher	1876	1880	1876	1879
Samuel Hitt Elbert	1876	1883	1879	1883
Wilbur F. Stone	1877	1886		
William E. Beck	1878	1889	1883	1889
Joseph Helm	1879	1892	1889	1892
Melville B. Gerry	1888	1889		
Victor A. Elliott	1889	1895		
Luther Marcellus Goddard	1892	1901		
Charles Hayt	1889	1898	1892	1898
William H. Gabbert	1898	1917		
Robert Wilbur Steele	1901	1910		
John Campbell	1922	1927		
Luther Marcellus Goddard	1905	1909		
John M. Maxwell	1905	1909		
Julius Caldeen Gunter	1905	1907		
George Wicks Bailey	1905	1909		
Charles F. Caswell	1906	1907		
Morton Shelley Bailey	1909	1922		
George W. Musser	1909	1915		
William A. Hill	1909	1919	1918	1919
S. Harrison White	1908	1919		
James E. Garrigues	1910	1921		
Tully Scott	1913	1923		
George W. Allen	1917	1927		
Haslett P. Burke	1919	1949		
John H. Denison	1919	1929		
Greeley W. Whitford	1921	1931		
John W. Sheafor	1923	1928		
John Taylor Adams	1925	1935		
Charles C. Butler	1927	1937	1935	1936
R. Hickman Walker	1928	1928		
Wilbur M. Alter	1928	1933		
Julian H. Moore	1929	1933		
Benjamin Hilliard	1930	1951		
Francis Eugene Bouck	1933	1941		
E. V. Holland	1933	1939		
John C. Young	1935	1945	1941	1945
William Lee Knous	1936	1946	1947	1948
Norris Conroy Bakke	1937	1947		
Otto Bock	1939	1942		
William S. Jackson	1942	1953		
Frank B. Goudy	1942	1944		
Wilbur M. Alter	1944	1957	1955	1957
Mortimer Stone	1945	1955		
Frank L. Hays	1947	1951		
George A. Luxford	1947	1949		
Ostis Otto Moore	1949	1968	1957; 1967	1964; 1969
E. V. Holland	1949	1959		
John R. Clark	1951	1956		
Francis J. Knauss	1951	1961		
George H. Bradfield	1953	1957		
Henry S. Lindsley	1955	1956		
Leonard v. B. Sutton	1956	1968		
Felix L. Sparks	1956	1956		
Edward C. Day Jr.	1957	1976		
Albert T. Frantz	1957	1967		
Frank H. Hall	1957	1964		
William Edward Doyle	1959	1961		
Robert Hugh McWilliams Jr.	1961	1970	1969	1970
Edward E. Pringle	1961	1983	1970	1978
Hilbert Schauer	1965	1967		
Paul V. Hodges	1967	1983	1978	1983
Donald E. Kelley	1967	1977		
James K. Groves	1968	1981		
Robert B. Lee	1968	1983		
William H. Erickson	1970	1996	1983	1985
Jim Carrigan	1976	1979		
Luis D. Rovira	1979	1990	1990	1995
Jean Dubofsky	1979	1987		
George E. Lohr	1979	1997		
Joseph R. Quinn	1980	1993	1985	1990
Howard Kirshbaum	1983	1997		
William D. Neighbors	1983	1987		
Anthony Vollack	1986	1998	1995	1998
Mary Mullarkey	1987	2010	1998	2010
Gregory K. Scott	1993	2000		
Rebecca Love Kourlis	1995	2006		
Alex J. Martinez	1996	2011		
Michael L. Bender	1997	2014	2010	2014
Gregory J. Hobbs Jr.	1996	2015		
Nancy E. Rice	1998	2018	2014	2018
Nathan B. Coats	2000	2020	2018	2020
Allison H. Eid	2006	2017		
Melissa Hart	2017	2026		
Monica Márquez	2010	Incumbent	2024	Incumbent
Brian Boatright	2011	Incumbent	2021	2024
William W. Hood III	2014	Incumbent		
Richard L. Gabriel	2015	Incumbent		
Carlos Samour	2018	Incumbent		
Maria Berkenkotter	2021	Incumbent		
Susan Blanco	2026	Incumbent		

== See also ==
- Bibliography of Colorado
- Geography of Colorado
- History of Colorado
- Index of Colorado-related articles
- List of Colorado-related lists
- Outline of Colorado
