= Justice Stone =

Justice Stone may refer to:

- Amherst W. Stone (1824–1900), associate justice of the Colorado Territorial Supreme Court
- Clyde E. Stone (1876–1948), associate justice of the Supreme Court of Illinois
- Edward Albert Stone (1844-1920), chief justice of the Supreme Court of Western Australia
- Frederick Stone (1820–1899), associate judge of the Maryland Court of Appeals
- George W. Stone (1811–1894), chief justice of the Alabama Supreme Court
- Harlan F. Stone (1872–1946), associate justice and chief justice of the United States Supreme Court
- Jesse N. Stone (1924–2001), associate justice of the Louisiana Supreme Court
- John W. Stone (1838–1922), associate justice of the Michigan Supreme Court
- Leonard Stone (judge) (1896–unknown), last British chief justice of the High Court of Bombay
- Raymond Stone (fl. 1900s), associate justice of the Supreme Court of Guam
- Royal A. Stone (1875–1942), associate justice of the Minnesota Supreme Court
- Walter F. Stone (1822–1874), associate justice of the Ohio Supreme Court
- Wilbur F. Stone (1833–1920), associate justice of the Colorado Supreme Court
- William B. Stone (1797–1872), associate judge of the Maryland Court of Appeals
- The Justice Stone, fictional artifact in The Monarchy (comics)

== See also ==
- Judge Stone (disambiguation)
