= Justice Thatcher =

Justice Thatcher may refer to:

- George Thatcher (1754–1824), associate justice of the Massachusetts Supreme Judicial Court from 1801 to 1824
- Henry Calvin Thatcher (1842–1884), chief justice of the Colorado Supreme Court from 1876 to 1879
