= Christian S. Eyster =

American judge (1814–1886)

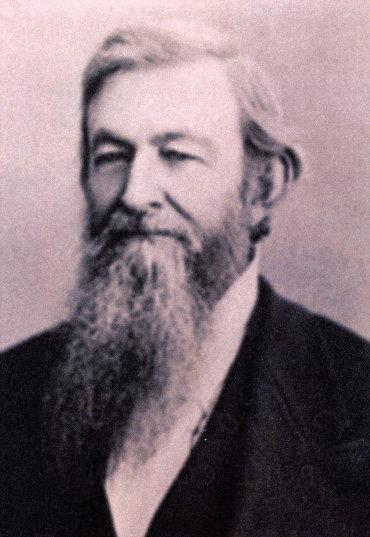

District Attorney of Denver
- In office 1875 – 1877

Justice of the Colorado Supreme Court
- In office 1866 – 1871
- Nominated by: Andrew Johnson
- Preceded by: William H. Gale
- Succeeded by: Ebenezer T. Wells

Member of the Pennsylvania House of Representatives
- In office 1857 – 1857
- In office 1855 – 1855
- In office 1853 – 1853

Personal details
- Born: May 19, 1814 Chambersburg, Pennsylvania
- Died: November 5, 1886 (aged 72) Fruita, Colorado
- Resting place: Cedar Grove Cemetery, Chambersburg
- Party: Republican (1857-1886)
- Other political affiliations: Whig (before 1853)

Christian Schlagle Eyster (May 19, 1814 – November 6, 1886) was an associate justice of the Colorado Territorial Supreme Court from August 11, 1866, to March 2, 1871. He was appointed by President Andrew Johnson in 1866, but because congress was not in session at the time of his appointment, the senate confirmed his appointment and he received his official commission on March 2, 1867.

Eyster was President Johnson's last Colorado judicial appointment. He was a former law partner of Secretary of State William H. Seward.

== Early life ==
Eyster was born in Chambersburg, Pennsylvania on May 19, 1814. He attended Wesleyan University in Connecticut, leaving in 1833. He practiced law in Pittsburgh from 1837 to 1840 and was a member of the Pennsylvania Legislature from 1853 to 1855.

== Career in Colorado ==
After he served on Colorado's Territorial Supreme Court, he practiced law in Colorado from 1871 to 1876. From 1875 to 1877, Eyster served as district attorney for a large part of northeastern Colorado, including Denver (then in Arapahoe County) and Weld County. He then practiced law and was involved in mining operations from 1878 until his death.

== Death ==
Eyster died November 6, 1886, in Fruita, Colorado.

Political offices
Preceded by William H. Gale	Justice of the Colorado Supreme Court; 1866–1871	Succeeded by Ebenezer T. Wells
