= Melissa Hart (judge) =

American judge (1969–2026)

Associate Justice of the Colorado Supreme Court
- In office December 14, 2017 – January 5, 2026
- Appointed by: John Hickenlooper
- Preceded by: Allison H. Eid
- Succeeded by: Susan Blanco

Personal details
- Born: 1969 Boise, Idaho, U.S.
- Died: October 1, 2026 (aged 57)
- Party: Democratic
- Spouse: Kevin Traskos (m. 2001)
- Education: Harvard University (BA, JD)

Melissa Hart (1969 – October 1, 2026) was an American lawyer who served as an associate justice of the Colorado Supreme Court from 2017 to 2026.

== Early life and career ==
Hart was born in Boise, Idaho, in 1969, to Phyllis Cox, a lawyer specializing in human rights, and Robert C. Hart, a business executive in the energy industry. Hart's grandfather through her mother Phyllis is Archibald Cox, a former U.S. Solicitor General and dean of Harvard Law School. In 1991, Hart received a Bachelor of Arts from Harvard University, where she wrote for The Harvard Crimson, and received her Juris Doctor magna cum laude from Harvard Law School in 1995, where she received the Sears Prize, was an articles editor of the Harvard Law Review, and was a member of the winning team in the 1994 Ames Moot Court Competition. After law school, she clerked for Judge Guido Calabresi of the United States Court of Appeals for the Second Circuit, and then for Justice John Paul Stevens of the Supreme Court of the United States from 1996 to 1997.

Following her clerkships, she worked as a litigation attorney for the U.S. Department of Justice in Washington, D.C. In 2001, she became an associate professor of law at the University of Colorado Law School in Boulder, Colorado, and was later named the Schaden Chair and Professor of Law and director of the Byron R. White Center for the Study of American Constitutional Law. An expert on employment discrimination law, Hart also taught at University of Denver Sturm College of Law.

In March 2015, Justice Gregory J. Hobbs Jr. announced that he would retire effective from September 1, 2015. The Colorado Judicial Nominating Commission nominated Hart along with state Court of Appeals judge Richard L. Gabriel and El Paso County District Court judge David Prince as possible candidates to replace Hobbs. Governor John Hickenlooper announced Gabriel as his choice to replace Hobbs on June 23, 2015.

On June 7, 2017, President Donald Trump nominated Justice Allison H. Eid to serve as a United States circuit judge of the US Court of Appeals for the Tenth Circuit, who was sworn in on November 4. On November 29 the Colorado Judicial Nominating Commission nominated Hart, 12th Judicial District Chief Judge Patti P. Swift, and attorney Marcy G. Glenn. On December 14, 2017, Gov. John Hickenlooper named Hart as an associate justice of the Colorado Supreme Court. After serving for the remainder of Eid's term, Hart stood for a retention election to a full ten-year term in 2020, which she won.

On December 19, 2025, citing health problems, Hart announced her resignation from the Supreme Court effective January 5, 2026.

== Personal life and death ==
On June 2, 2001, Hart married Kevin Thomas Traskos, who is also an attorney.

Hart died on October 1, 2026, at the age of 57. The American Bar Association noted her wisdom, intellectual rigor and "unwavering commitment to expanding access to justice." Colorado Governor Jared Polis also noted her wisdom and "judicial commitment to fairness and equality," and ordered government flags to fly at half staff for her memorial.

== See also ==
- List of law clerks for the fourth seat of the Supreme Court of the United States

== Selected publications ==
- Hart (with Maria Ontiveros, Roberto Corrada, and Michael Selmi), Employment Discrimination Law: Cases and Material on Equality in the Workplace (Thomson/West, 10th ed. 2016). ISBN 1634597478.

Legal offices
Preceded by Allison H. Eid	Associate Justice of the Colorado Supreme Court; 2017–2026	Succeeded by Susan Blanco
