= William S. Jackson (judge) =

American judge (1889–1981)

Director of First National Bank Of Colorado Springs
- In office 1932–1942

Justice of the Colorado Supreme Court
- In office 1942–1951

Chief Justice of the Colorado Supreme Court
- In office 1951–1953
- Preceded by: Otto Bock
- Succeeded by: George H. Bradfield

Personal details
- Born: William Sharpless Jackson; March 22, 1889 Colorado Springs, Colorado, U.S.
- Died: July 8, 1981 (aged 92) Denver, Colorado, U.S.
- Education: Colorado College (transferred out); Harvard University (BA); University of Denver (PhD)

William Sharpless Jackson (March 22, 1889 – July 8, 1981) was an associate justice of the Colorado Supreme Court from 1942 to 1953.

He was born in Colorado Springs, Colorado and he graduated in 1906 with the first class at Cutler Academy, where he was a member of the state championship baseball team in 1906. He attended Colorado College for one year before transferring to Harvard College He received his Bachelor of Arts degree from Harvard University in 1911. He then moved to the Sturm College of Law at the University of Denver, graduating in 1915.

He was a lawyer in Colorado Springs at Bierbauer and Jackson, and served as director of the First National Bank of Colorado Springs from 1932 to 1942. In 1934, he was appointed president of the Colorado Bar Association. In 1942 he was appointed to the Colorado Supreme Court, and he served as Chief Justice of the Court from 1951 to 1953. He was a trustee of Colorado College from 1925 to 1958.

Political offices
Preceded by Otto Bock	Justice of the Colorado Supreme Court; 1942–1953	Succeeded by George H. Bradfield
