= George A. Hinsdale =

American politician and lawyer (1826–1874)

Lieutenant Governor of Colorado Territory
- In office December 12, 1865 – December 19, 1865

Personal details
- Born: George Aaron Hinsdale; December 21, 1826 Hinesburg, Vermont
- Died: January 15, 1874 (aged 47) Pueblo, Colorado
- Party: Democratic Party
- Spouse: Josephine Murray Sebastian
- Children: Four
- Education: University of Michigan
- Profession: Lawyer, miner, politician

George A. Hinsdale (December 21, 1826 – January 15, 1874) was a lawyer, miner, and Democratic Party politician who served in the Nebraska Territorial Legislature and the Colorado Territorial Council and was elected lieutenant governor of Colorado Territory. Hinsdale County, Colorado is named for him.

== Early life ==
Born in Hinesburg, Vermont, the son of a lawyer, Hinsdale moved with his family to Michigan when he was seven. He graduated from the University of Michigan and then worked in his father's law office. He then traveled to Kentucky to manage a coal mining operation along the Ohio River. There he met and married his wife, Josephine Sebastian.

== Relocation to Nebraska and Colorado ==
He suffered from asthma, so he moved west to lessen its effects. Initially, he and his wife moved to Dakota City, Nebraska around 1857, where he worked as a lawyer. He was elected there to serve a term in the Nebraska Territorial Legislature in 1859. Still suffering from asthma, Hinsdale and his family moved further west to Colorado in 1860.

He tried mining in Colorado's California Gulch and later moved to Cañon City, and then, in 1863, he moved to Pueblo. From there, he moved to San Luis, Colorado for two years, and then relocated back to Pueblo in 1866, where he resided for the rest of his life.

== Elected offices ==
Colorado's Territorial Legislature had two branches: the senate and the council. In 1865, Hinsdale was elected to the Territorial Council to represent Costilla County. Also in 1865, as part of an unsuccessful attempt to transition Colorado Territory into a state, he was elected Lieutenant Governor of Colorado Territory. The territorial legislature met at Golden on December 12, 1865, adjourned to Denver on December 16, and adjourned sine die on December 19, 1865. The legislature was set to be Colorado's first upon being granted statehood, but President Johnson vetoed Colorado's statehood application. Hinsdale's tenure as lieutenant governor (and president of the senate) lasted only for the week the legislature existed. From then on, Hinsdale was generally known as "Governor Hinsdale". In 1867, having moved back to Pueblo, he was again elected to the Territorial Council, and in 1870 he was elected its president.

== Other service and legacy ==
In Pueblo, he served on the first board of trustees to be seated following the city's incorporation. He also was elected president of the Pueblo school board and served as the county attorney for Pueblo County. Together with Wilbur Fiske Stone, he founded The Pueblo Chieftain newspaper.

== Personal life and death ==
George A. Hinsdale married Josephine Murray Sebastian on October 9, 1856, in Cloverport, Kentucky. Together they had four children, three of whom lived to adulthood and one of whom was born the day following Hinsdale's death.

Hinsdale died on January 15, 1874, aged 47, in Pueblo. In the month following his death, upon a reorganization of the territory's counties, one newly created county was named for him: Hinsdale County, established on February 10, 1874. Although Hinsdale played a role in advancing the cause of statehood in Colorado, his untimely death — two years, six and one-half months before statehood was granted on August 1, 1876 — prevented him from ever seeing the State of Colorado.
