= Rebecca R. Freyre =

American judge (born 1959)

Judge of the Colorado Court of Appeals
- Incumbent
- Assumed office September 18, 2015
- Appointed by: John Hickenlooper
- Preceded by: Richard L. Gabriel

Personal details
- Born: December 9, 1959 (age 66) Kansas City, Kansas, U.S.
- Education: Smith College (BA); University of Denver College of Law (JD)

Rebecca R. Freyre (born December 9, 1959) is a Judge of the Colorado Court of Appeals.

== Early life and education ==
Freyre was born December 9, 1959, in Kansas City, Kansas. She earned her undergraduate degree at Smith College in 1982 and her Juris Doctor from the University of Denver College of Law in 1990.

== Legal career ==
Before joining the court, she practiced as a criminal appellate lawyer for the Colorado State Public Defender's Office for eleven years and as a criminal trial deputy in the 18th Judicial District for fourteen years.

== Appointment to state court of appeals ==
She was appointed by Governor John Hickenlooper on September 18, 2015, to succeed Judge Richard L. Gabriel. Her current term expires on January 7, 2027. She was sworn in on November 16, 2015.

== Other activities ==
Freyre is married with three children.

Legal offices
Preceded by Richard L. Gabriel	Judge of the Colorado Court of Appeals; 2015–present	Incumbent
