= William H. Gale =

American judge

William Henry Gale (1829 – February 12, 1899) was an associate justice of the Colorado Territorial Supreme Court from June 10, 1865, to July 19, 1866.

== Early life and political efforts ==
Little is written about Gale, and sources differ on his origin. One source says he was from Illinois, but another says he was from New York. A contemporaneous account describes him as being "of New York", but does not indicate whether that was his place of birth or merely his domicile at the time.

It appears that Gale was examined and found to possess the qualifications required for admission to the bar in New York in September 1849. He became involved in Republican politics in New York, albeit with little success. In 1855 he was a candidate for county judge, and in 1858, a candidate for Alderman. He was again a candidate for county judge in 1859, and in 1862, and in January 1865 was appointed a Commissioner of Deeds.

== Judicial service ==
In June 1865, Gale and Charles F. Holly were jointly appointed to the Colorado Territorial Supreme Court by President Andrew Johnson, and subsequently confirmed by the United States Senate. Gale was preceded as associate justice by Charles Lee Armour and succeeded by Christian S. Eyster. He resigned because he found his salary inadequate.

== Later life ==
Gale returned to Brooklyn, practicing law in a solo practice from 1866 to 1874, then as a partner in the firm of Gale & Melvin until 1876, and then in then in the firm of Gale & Van Vieck until 1878. He thereafter returned to solo practice until 1890. By 1890, it was reported that "ex-Judge William H. Gale" had headed an unsuccessful opposition ticket in the Republican primary election for leadership of Brooklyn's Twenty-fifth Ward. In July 1891, Gale was "busily engaged... as a referee under appointment from Judge Pratt" taking testimony in the child custody case of a wealthy New York family. In August of that year, it was reported that Gale's wife Mary had died at their home in Brooklyn, survived by her husband, their son Charles, and their daughter Mary. In 1892, Gale returned to practice in a partnership, with the firm of Gale & Williams.

Gale continued working on matters in Brooklyn as a referee or commissioner in the mid-1890s. He died at the age of 71, and was interred in Middletown, New York.

Political offices
| Preceded by Charles Lee Armour | Justice of the Colorado Supreme Court; 1865–1866 | Succeeded by Christian S. Eyster |
