= Tully Scott =

American judge (1857–1924)

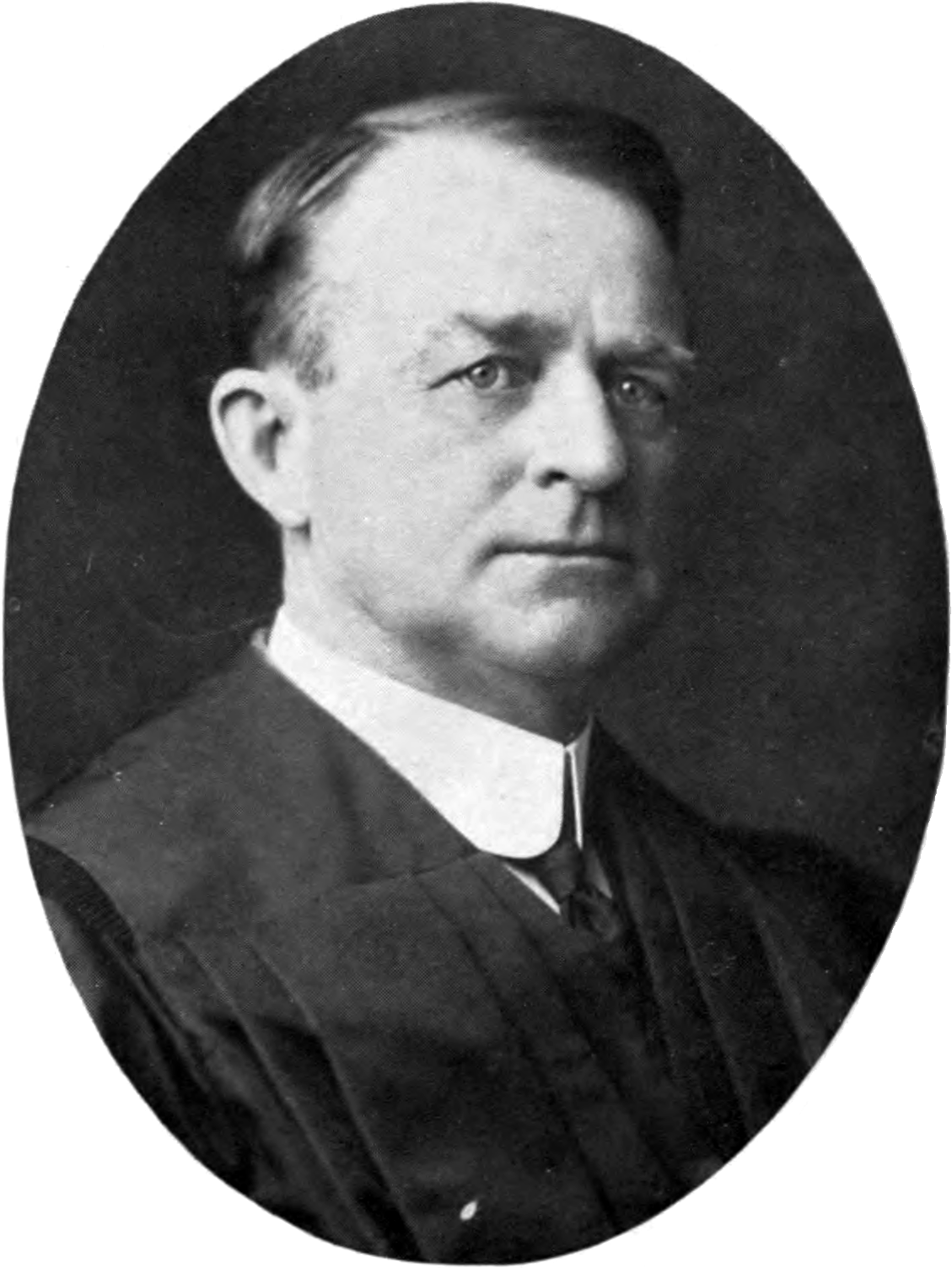
Tully Scott as of 1917

Tully Scott (July 12, 1857 – May 4, 1924) was an associate justice of the Colorado Supreme Court from 1913 to 1922, and chief justice from 1922 to 1923. From 1907 to 1911 he was a member of the Colorado Senate.

== Early life and education ==
Born in St. Paris, Ohio, Scott began working at the age of ten, driving a team of mules during the construction of a turnpike in Ohio. He attended high school in St. Paris, and later moved with his family to Beloit, Kansas, where his father homesteaded land. Scott saved money to attend the Kansas State Agricultural College (now Kansas State University), completing the four-year course in two years while working to pay his expenses by caring for the college's livestock.

After graduating, Scott studied law and was admitted to the Kansas bar in 1880. He practiced in Beloit, and from 1885 to 1889 served as receiver of public moneys in Oberlin, Kansas, appointed by President Grover Cleveland.

== Career ==
Scott was active in Kansas Democratic politics, serving on the Democratic central committee and running unsuccessfully for Congress in 1900. In 1901, he moved with his wife to Cripple Creek, Colorado, and was admitted to the Colorado bar the same year.

From 1907 to 1911, Scott represented Teller County in the Colorado Senate, where he was instrumental in passing several statutes. In 1911, he was appointed presiding judge of the Colorado Court of Appeals, serving for one year.

Scott was elected associate justice of the Colorado Supreme Court in 1912, taking office in 1913. He served until 1923, becoming chief justice in 1922 upon the retirement of James E. Garrigues. During his tenure, he authored opinions described as "among the ablest ever handed down by a Western judge".

Following the end of his term on the Supreme Court, Scott was appointed to the Colorado Public Utilities Commission in January 1923. In 1920, he was the Democratic nominee for the United States Senate, but lost to Republican Samuel Nicholson.

== Personal life and death ==
In December 1891, Scott married Harriet I. Hunter of Pana, Illinois, with whom he had three children: Kempthorne Scott of Dallas, Texas; Jack Garrett Scott of Antonito, Colorado; and Mrs. Mira Scott Frank of Denver. He also had two brothers, one living in Kansas City and another in Fresno, California.

In February 1921, Scott suffered from a paralytic stroke that was so bad that he was prematurely reported by several newspapers to have died. Scott actually died at his home in Denver on May 4, 1924, at the age of 66, following complications from heart disease and his prior stroke.

Political offices
Preceded by John Campbell	Justice of the Colorado Supreme Court; 1913–1923	Succeeded by John W. Sheafor
