= 1896 Colorado gubernatorial election =

- November 3, 1896
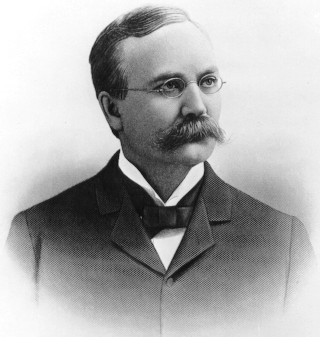

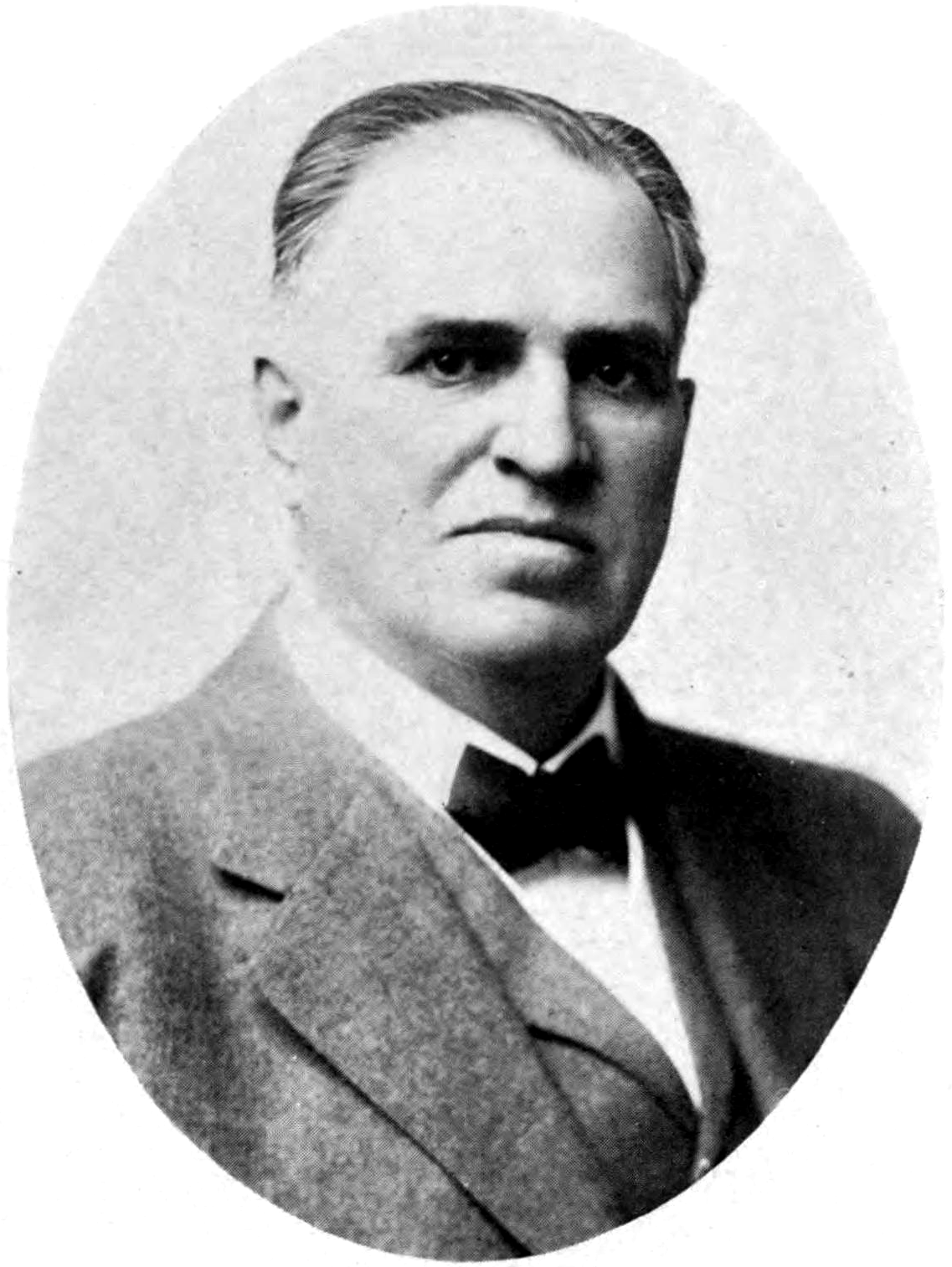

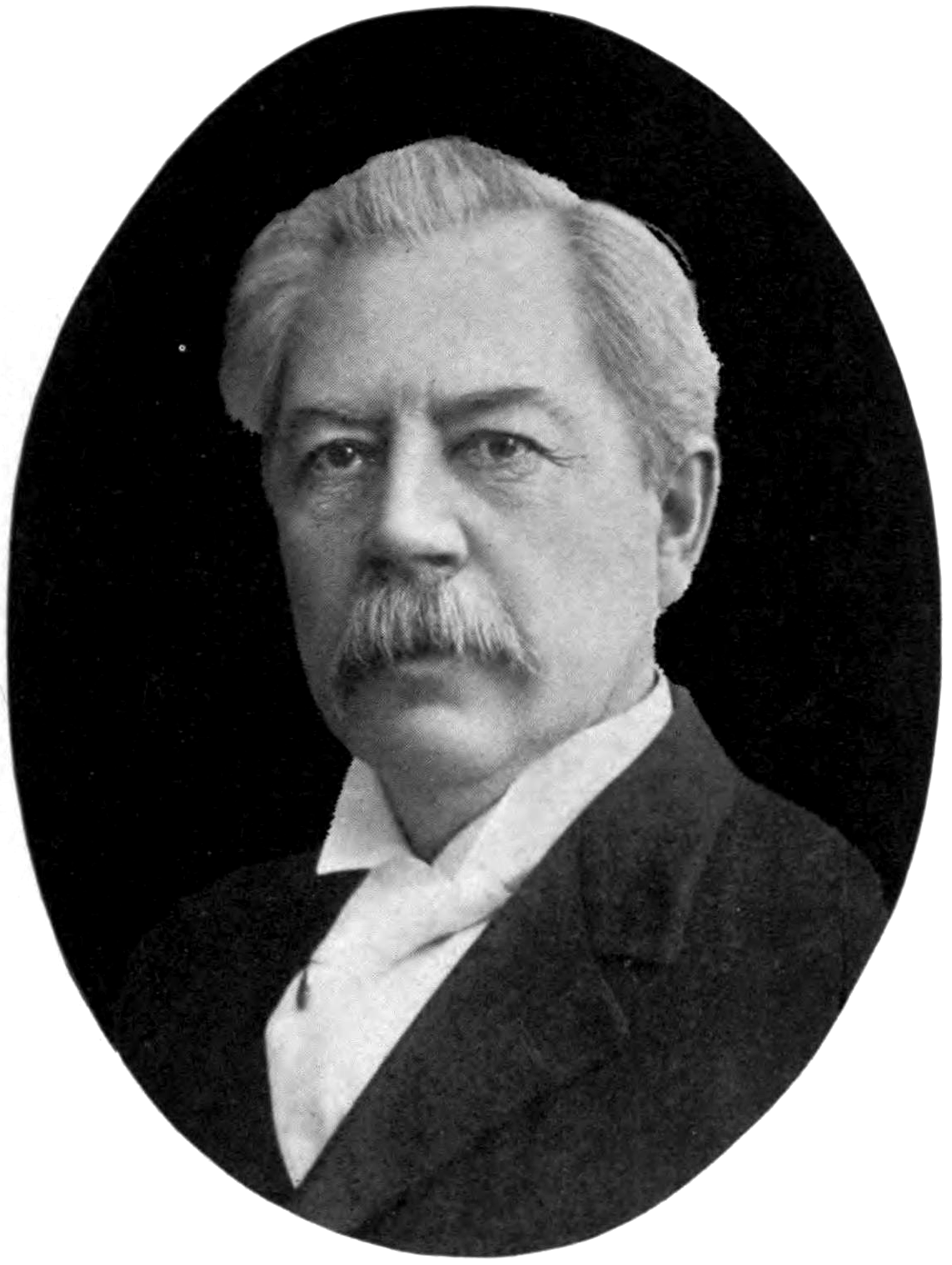
Nominee	Alva Adams	Morton Shelley Bailey	George W. Allen
Party	Democratic	Populist	Republican
Popular vote	87,387	71,808	23,945
Percentage	46.22%	37.98%	12.66%
- County results Adams: 30–40% 40–50% 50–60% 60–70% 70–80% 80–90% Bailey: 30–40% 40–50% 50–60% 60–70% Allen: 50–60%
Governor before election
Albert McIntire
Republican
Elected Governor
Alva Adams
Democratic

The 1896 Colorado gubernatorial election was held on November 3, 1896. Democratic nominee Alva Adams defeated People's Party nominee Morton Shelley Bailey with 46.22% of the vote.

== General election ==
=== Candidates ===
Major party candidates

- Alva Adams, Democratic
- George W. Allen, Republican

Other candidates

- Morton Shelley Bailey, People's
- Davis Hanson Waite, Independent

=== Results ===
1896 Colorado gubernatorial election
Party	Candidate	Votes	%	±%
Democratic	Alva Adams	87,387	46.22%	+41.59%
Populist	Morton Shelley Bailey	71,808	37.98%	−3.08%
Republican	George W. Allen	23,945	12.66%	−39.29%
Independent	Davis Hanson Waite	3,359	1.78%	N/A
Majority		15,579	8.24%	
Turnout		186,499		
Democratic gain from Republican		Swing		

County	Adams %	Adams #	Bailey %	Bailey #	Allen %	Allen #	Waite %	Waite #	Total
Arapahoe	41.67%	20,711	45.19%	22,458	10.70%	5,320	2.42%	1,207	49,696
Archuleta	64.62%	338	6.30%	33	26.76%	140	2.29%	12	523
Baca	45.91%	118	3.50%	9	50.19%	129	0.38%	1	257
Bent	63.02%	508	10.79%	87	23.32%	188	2.85%	23	806
Boulder	45.67%	3,341	36.47%	2,668	12.53%	917	5.30%	388	7,314
Chaffee	43.57%	1,204	51.82%	1,432	3.80%	105	0.79%	22	2,763
Cheyenne	45.83%	88	7.29%	14	44.79%	86	2.08%	4	192
Clear Creek	40.64%	1,399	55.37%	1,906	1.94%	67	2.03%	70	3,442
Conejos	87.52%	2,182	8.70%	217	3.16%	79	0.60%	15	2,493
Costilla	50.65%	734	19.94%	289	26.84%	389	2.55%	37	1,449
Custer	67.12%	784	16.78%	196	14.81%	173	1.28%	15	1,168
Delta	33.87%	607	53.79%	964	7.14%	128	5.18%	93	1,792
Dolores	41.40%	282	56.24%	383	1.32%	9	1.02%	7	681
Douglas	65.08%	798	19.73%	242	13.29%	163	1.87%	23	1,226
Eagle	46.43%	560	47.51%	573	3.81%	46	2.23%	27	1,206
El Paso	33.49%	8,370	38.60%	9,645	24.17%	6,041	3.72%	930	24,986
Elbert	53.15%	572	18.86%	203	25.09%	270	2.88%	31	1,076
Fremont	41.07%	2,088	43.72%	2,223	10.79%	549	4.40%	224	5,084
Garfield	43.89%	996	45.70%	1,037	6.65%	151	3.74%	85	2,269
Gilpin	49.77%	1,412	38.17%	1,083	8.03%	228	4.01%	114	2,837
Grand	66.92%	176	26.99%	71	3.04%	8	3.04%	8	263
Gunnison	54.77%	1,347	34.72%	854	5.81%	143	4.67%	115	2,459
Hinsdale	48.09%	341	36.53%	259	1.97%	14	13.39%	95	709
Huerfano	58.67%	1,678	8.18%	234	32.44%	928	0.69%	20	2,860
Jefferson	65.16%	2,342	22.25%	800	7.06%	254	5.50%	198	3,594
Kiowa	47.05%	136	10.72%	31	41.17%	119	1.03%	3	289
Kit Carson	32.66%	163	10.02%	50	50.70%	253	6.61%	33	499
La Plata	62.96%	1,812	32.48%	935	2.77%	80	1.77%	51	2,878
Lake	44.06%	3,032	52.30%	3,599	2.20%	152	1.42%	98	6,881
Larimer	46.05%	1,876	33.46%	1,363	16.15%	658	4.32%	176	4,073
Las Animas	70.88%	4,698	12.62%	837	14.80%	981	1.68%	112	6,628
Lincoln	52.90%	173	10.70%	35	32.72%	107	3.66%	12	327
Logan	31.92%	287	36.48%	328	24.47%	220	7.11%	64	899
Mesa	36.59%	1,086	39.15%	1,162	16.30%	484	7.95%	236	2,968
Mineral	43.81%	361	51.21%	422	1.21%	10	3.76%	31	824
Montezuma	66.66%	580	27.12%	236	4.59%	40	1.60%	14	870
Montrose	43.70%	681	42.42%	661	9.62%	150	4.23%	66	1,558
Morgan	32.76%	271	38.81%	321	24.18%	200	4.23%	35	827
Otero	53.00%	1,429	24.85%	670	18.58%	501	3.56%	96	2,696
Ouray	44.94%	995	52.75%	1,168	0.90%	20	1.40%	31	2,214
Park	36.15%	619	55.08%	943	6.48%	111	2.27%	39	1,712
Phillips	53.19%	283	11.84%	63	33.64%	179	1.31%	7	532
Pitkin	30.11%	1,155	64.22%	2,463	0.88%	34	4.77%	183	3,835
Prowers	43.59%	381	17.16%	150	34.78%	304	4.46%	39	874
Pueblo	59.78%	5,841	28.72%	2,806	9.95%	973	1.53%	150	9,770
Rio Blanco	74.30%	373	15.93%	80	6.37%	32	3.38%	17	502
Rio Grande	36.10%	586	51.50%	836	10.28%	167	2.09%	34	1,623
Routt	78.71%	895	9.76%	111	8.26%	94	3.25%	37	1,137
Saguache	36.78%	497	48.92%	661	11.25%	152	3.03%	41	1,351
San Juan	40.69%	643	55.37%	875	0.88%	14	3.03%	48	1,580
San Miguel	67.50%	1,533	24.30%	552	2.95%	67	5.23%	119	2,271
Sedgwick	53.06%	182	9.91%	34	33.52%	115	3.49%	12	343
Summit	57.56%	727	37.68%	476	1.66%	21	3.08%	39	1,263
Washington	29.36%	121	11.89%	49	50.72%	209	8.00%	33	412
Weld	48.82%	2,764	32.07%	1,816	14.16%	802	4.92%	279	5,661
Yuma	36.66%	231	30.95%	195	27.14%	171	5.23%	33	630

Counties that flipped from Republican to Populist

- Arapahoe
- El Paso
- Fremont
- Logan
- Morgan

Counties that flipped from Populist to Democratic

- Archuleta
- Boulder
- Gilpin
- Gunnison
- Hinsdale
- La Plata
- Montezuma
- Montrose
- Otero
- San Miguel
- Summit
- Yuma

Counties that flipped from Republican to Democratic

- Bent
- Cheyenne
- Conejos
- Costilla
- Custer
- Douglas
- Elbert
- Grand
- Huerfano
- Jefferson
- Kiowa
- Larimer
- Las Animas
- Lincoln
- Phillips
- Prowers
- Pueblo
- Rio Blanco
- Routt
- Sedgwick
- Weld
