= Sueanna P. Johnson =

Colorado state judge

Judge of the Colorado Court of Appeals
- Incumbent
- Assumed office February 13, 2020
- Appointed by: Jared Polis

Personal details
- Born: 1975 (age 50–51) Seoul, South Korea
- Education: Colorado College (BA); University of Colorado at Boulder (JD)

Sueanna P. Johnson (born 1975) is a Judge of the Colorado Court of Appeals.

== Education and career ==
Johnson attended Colorado College, studying abroad at the University of Manchester and graduating with a Bachelor of Arts in political science in 1997. She then earned her Juris Doctor from the University of Colorado at Boulder in 2003.

While at law school, Johnson clerked for judge John Coughlin at the Denver District Court. After graduating with her JD, she joined the office of the Colorado Attorney General, becoming a Senior Assistant Attorney General in 2017. She left the office upon being appointed by Governor Jared Polis to the state Court of Appeals.

Johnson took office on February 13, 2020, and subsequently won election to a full eight-year term on November 8, 2022.

== Personal life ==
Johnson was born in 1975 in Seoul, South Korea. She was adopted by parents from Colorado and brought to the United States at the age of three. She is a person with both albinism and visual impairment.
