= Law Week Colorado =

- Type: Weekly newspaper
- Owner(s): Circuit Media LLC
- Publisher: Rebecca Askew
- Editor: Jess Brovsky-Eaker
- Founded: 2002
- Language: English
- Headquarters: 560 Cherokee Street; Denver, CO 80204
- Website: lawweekcolorado.com

Law Week Colorado is a weekly newspaper covering legal issues specifically for lawyers, law firms, corporate counsel and the judiciary in Colorado. It is an official Colorado legal publication, as defined by state statute. The publication launched in 2002 and is owned by Circuit Media LLC, which also owns State Bill Colorado.

== Features ==
Law Week covers items of interest to lawyers, including lawsuits, practice management, firm news, notable verdicts, and industry gossip. The publication has had sponsor relationships with organizations including Best Lawyers and the Colorado chapter of the Legal Marketing Association.

Among the signature features that regularly appear in Law Week are Barrister's Best, an annual presentation of peer-recommended lawyers in the state; Big Deals, a quarterly summary of significant merger and acquisition transactions executed by Colorado lawyers; Legal Lasso, a daily summary of the publication's stories; Managing Partner Roundtable, a four-times-per-year group interview with leaders of Front Range law firms; Outstanding Legal Professionals, a periodic celebration of acclaimed paralegals and legal assistants in the state's legal sector; Top Women, which provides a spotlight on outstanding female attorneys in Colorado; Up-and-Coming Lawyers, a glimpse at early-career attorneys in the state; and 5Q, a twice-weekly opportunity for lawyers, judges, and other professionals in the state's legal community to provide brief insights into their views on issues facing the profession and their personality.

Law Week also regularly publishes a look at Colorado legal history and a summary of Colorado Supreme Court and Colorado Court of Appeals opinions. Guest contributors supply occasional commentary.

== Publisher and Editorial Staff ==
The publisher is Rebecca Askew. As of September 2021 the managing editor is Jess Brovsky-Eaker. Law Week reporters include Jessica Folker, Clara Geoghegan and Avery Martinez.

== Awards and recognition ==
Law Week has been recognized for its journalism with a Top of the Rockies award.
