= Wilbur M. Alter =

American judge

Justice of the Colorado Supreme Court
- In office 1928–1933
- Preceded by: R. Hickman Walker

Justice of the Colorado Supreme Court
- In office 1944–1957
- Preceded by: Frank B. Goudy

Chief justice of the Colorado Supreme Court
- In office 1955–1957

Personal details
- Born: December 17, 1879 Allegheny County, Pennsylvania
- Died: July 30, 1967 (aged 87)
- Education: University of Denver
- Occupation: Attorney, justice and chief justice

Wilbur McClure Alter (December 17, 1879 – July 30, 1967) was an American lawyer and judge who served on the Colorado Supreme Court as a justice and chief justice. He was a trustee for a college and El Paso County bar association. He led the international effort to provide aid to the world's needy children through the American Legion.

== Early education and education ==
He was born in Allegheny County, Pennsylvania in 1879. His parents were Daniel G. and Ada V. (Lutz) Alter. He studied at public schools in California and Colorado and attended a college prep school. His parents and at least one sister lived in California.

He graduated from the University of Denver in 1903 (Note: He is also said to have graduated in 1904. The Beta Theta Pi fraternity volume produced in 1902 stated that he was in the class of 1903.) and received his law degree in 1906. He was a member of the Phi Delta Phi and the Beta Theta Pi fraternities.

== Career ==
With Ernest B. Upton, he established the law firm Alter & Upton in Victor, Colorado. Their clients included the Light & Power Company, Midland Terminal Railway, and the Arkansas Valley Railway. In 1911, Alter, his brother D.G. Alter, Jr., and Edward J. Boughton established the Diamond M. Leasing company to operate leased properties, including the Lucky Gus Mine owned by the Stratton estate.

From 1910 to 1912 and again from 1914 to 1918, he was the city attorney of Victor. He was the city attorney for Goldfield from 1912 to 1918. During World War I, he enlisted in the military. He served in the army tank service and was stationed in Gettysburg, Pennsylvania at Camp Colt in 1918. His brother was also assigned to the army tank service at Camp Colt.

He was the county attorney for Teller County from 1917 to 1923. From 1919 to 1923, he was the Deputy District Attorney for the 4th District, and was then a District Judge for the same district from 1923 to 1928.

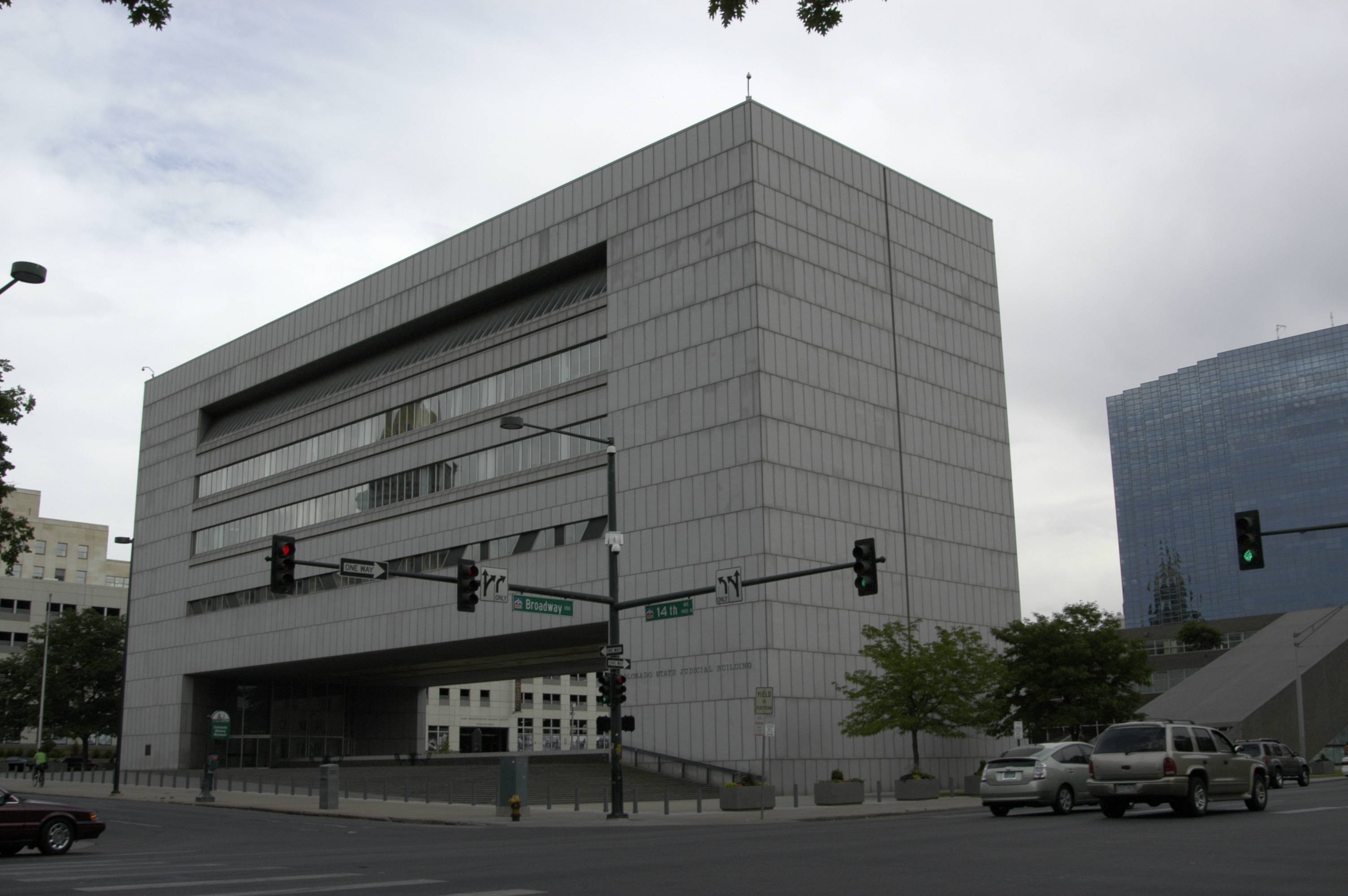
Colorado state judicial building in Denver, housing the Colorado Supreme Court. The building was destroyed by controlled detonation in 2010.

In 1928, Alter won election to the Colorado Supreme Court, defeating incumbent R. Hickman Walker, who had been appointed to the seat following the death of John W. Sheafor earlier that year. Alter served from 1928 to 1933 and again from 1944 to 1957. He served as chief justice of the Court from 1955 to 1957. He was a trustee for the El Paso County Bar Association by 1924.

== Personal life ==
Alter and his brother, D.G. Alter, Jr., both lived in Victor, Colorado by 1918. He married Florence E. Christy on February 4, 1923. He had three sons.

He was a member of the American Legion, where he was the National Chairman of the Executive Committee for the National Child Welfare Committee. He reported in 1935 that more than 250,000 children across the world received aid or other assistance. An award was created in his name, Judge Wilbur M. Alter Award, for having the most outstanding rehabilitation program in Colorado. He was also a member of Victor Lodge No. 99 in Victor, Colorado and of the Elks. He was a trustee of the George W. Clayton College in Denver.

In 1967, he died in a nursing home in Jefferson County, Colorado.
