= Donald E. Kelley =

American judge (1908–1995)

Donald E. Kelley (January 29, 1908 – September 17, 1995) was an associate justice of the Colorado Supreme Court from 1967 to 1977.

== Early life, education, and career ==
Born in McCook, Nebraska, Kelley attended a one-room grade school in Red Willow County, Nebraska, and was inspired to pursue a legal career by his grandfather, who was a lawyer.

He attended the University of Nebraska, where he earned his law degree in 1930. Following his graduation from law school, Kelley moved to Denver, Colorado, where he entered private law practice.

== Political and judicial career ==
In 1953, President Dwight D. Eisenhower appointed Kelley United States Attorney for the District of Colorado, in which capacity Kelley served until 1958.

In 1962, Kelley was elected to the Colorado Senate, and in 1966 he sought election to the state supreme court. In November 1966, Kelley was elected to the Colorado Supreme Court, defeated incumbent Justice Hilbert Schauer. He took office on the court in January 1967 and served for ten years until his retirement in 1977. He was succeeded on the bench by Justice Luis D. Rovira.

== Personal life and death ==
In 1930, Kelley married Georgia E. Pyne, with whom he had two sons.

Kelley died in Denver, Colorado, at the age of 87.

Political offices
Preceded by Hilbert Schauer	Justice of the Colorado Supreme Court; 1967–1977	Succeeded by Luis D. Rovira
