= Frank B. Goudy =

American judge (1882–1944)

Frank Burris Goudy (1882 – October 14, 1944) was an associate justice of the Colorado Supreme Court from 1942 until his death in 1944.

Born in Ouray, Colorado, the son of Frank Curtis Goudy, an attorney, the family moved several times before setting in Denver. Goudy received an undergraduate degree from Stanford University in 1905, and then worked as an engineer in mining and irrigation. In 1915, after a postgraduate year studying law, he gained admission to the bar in Colorado, and "entered partnership with his father, specializing in irrigation and insurance law".

In August 1942, Governor Ralph Lawrence Carr appointed Goudy to a seat on the state supreme court made vacant by the death of Justice Otto Bock. Goudy was then elected to the seat as a Republican that November, defeating Democratic candidate Byron G. Rogers.

Goudy served for two years, then died at his home after an illness of several months at the age of 62.

Political offices
Preceded by Otto Bock	Justice of the Colorado Supreme Court; 1942–1944	Succeeded by Wilbur M. Alter
