= Judge Stone =

Judge Stone may refer to:

- Abby Stone, fictional judge on the TV series Night Court
- Andrew H. Stone (fl. 1980s–2020s), judge of the Third Judicial District Court of Utah
- Earl S. Stone (fl. 1840s), namesake of the Judge Earl S. Stone House in Indiana
- Harry Stone, fictional judge on the TV series Night Court
- Kimbrough Stone (1875–1958), judge of the United States Court of Appeals for the Eighth Circuit
- Margaret Stone (judge) (died 2021), judge of the Federal Court of Australia.
- Patrick Thomas Stone (1889–1963), judge of the United States District Court for the Western District of Wisconsin
- William M. Stone (1827–1893), judge of the Iowa state district court
- Judge Stone (novel), a 2026 legal thriller novel co-written by Viola Davis and James Patterson

== See also ==
- Justice Stone (disambiguation)
