= Melissa C. Meirink =

American judge

Judge of the Colorado Court of Appeals
- Incumbent
- Assumed office January 14, 2025
- Appointed by: Jared Polis

Personal details
- Born: 1979 (age 46–47) Torreon, Mexico
- Education: University of Colorado in Boulder (BA); Seattle University (JD)

Melissa C. Meirink (born 1979 in Torreon, Mexico) is a Judge of the Colorado Court of Appeals. She is an indigenous Mexican, of the Yaqui people.

Prior to assuming her post, Meirink was a staff attorney with the Colorado Supreme Court.
