= Gilbert M. Román =

American judge (born 1962)

Chief Judge of the Colorado Court of Appeals
- Incumbent
- Assumed office December 31, 2021
- Appointed by: Brian Boatright
- Preceded by: Steve Bernard

Judge of the Colorado Court of Appeals
- Incumbent
- Assumed office August 1, 2005
- Appointed by: Bill Owens

Personal details
- Born: September 15, 1962 (age 63) Wichita, Kansas, U.S.
- Education: Colorado State University (BS); University of Michigan (JD)

Gilbert M. Román (born September 15, 1962) is the chief judge of the Colorado Court of Appeals.

== Early life and education ==
Román was born on September 15, 1962, in Wichita, Kansas. He earned a bachelor's degree in political science from Colorado State University in 1984 and received his Juris Doctor from the University of Michigan Law School in 1987.

== Career ==
Román was a partner in the law firm of Rothgerber Johnson & Lyons in Denver, Colorado. He served as Associate General Counsel for Kaiser-Hill Corporation in Broomfield, Colorado, and was a partner in the firms of Roman, Benezra & Culver, LLC in Lakewood, Colorado and Feiger, Collison & Killmer in Denver. He was an associate with the firm of Sherman & Howard in Denver.

=== Colorado Court of Appeals ===
He was appointed to the court by Governor Bill Owens on August 1, 2005. He was retained by voters in 2008 and again in 2016. His current term expires on January 13, 2025. On October 8, 2021, chief justice Brian Boatright appointed Román to serve as the chief judge of the Colorado Court of Appeals, effective December 31, 2021.

== Personal ==
Román is married to his wife Donna, and they have three children.

== See also ==
- List of Hispanic and Latino American jurists
