= The Pueblo Chieftain =

Newspaper in Pueblo, Colorado, US

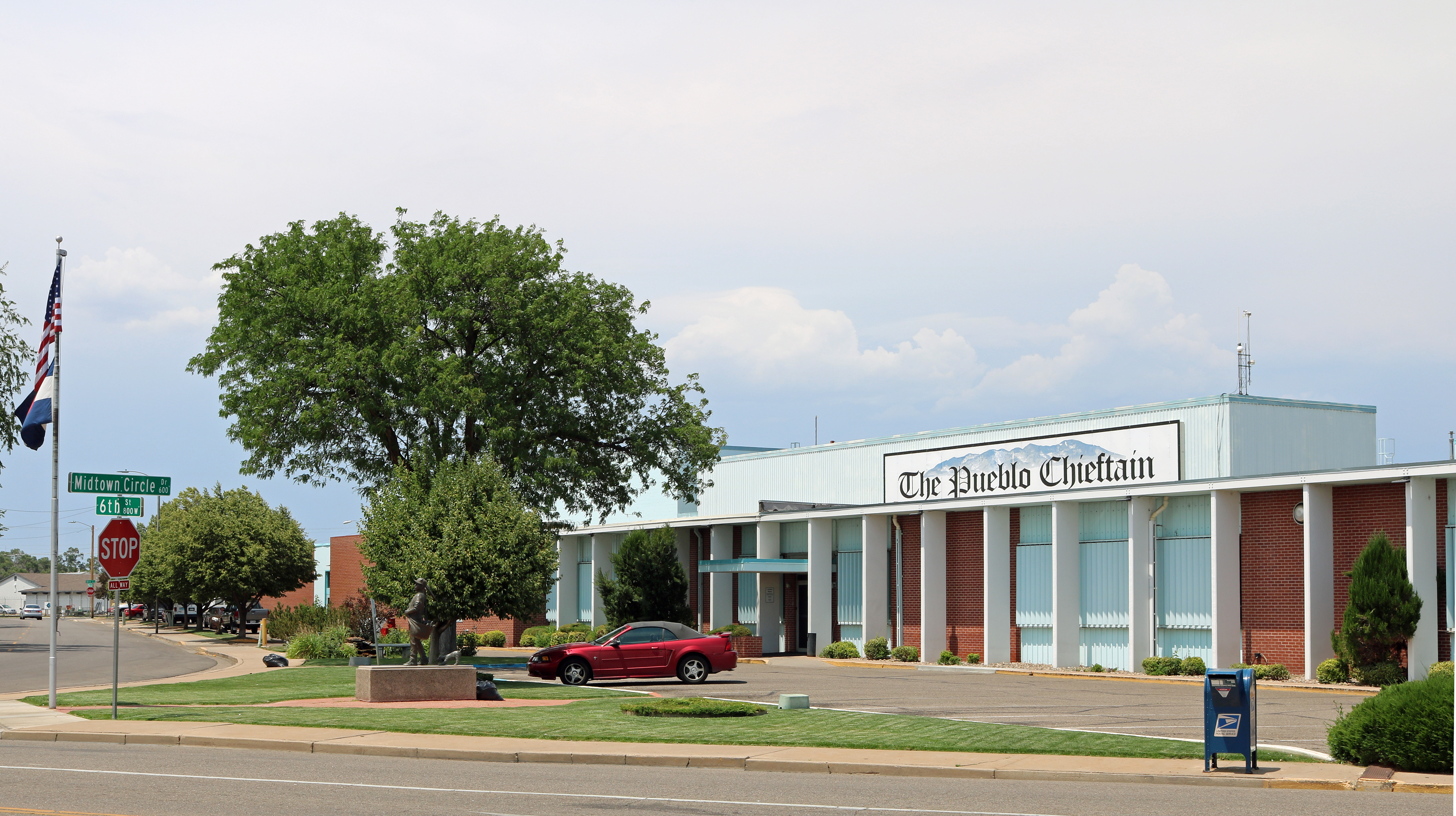
- The Chieftain's former offices on West 6th Street in Pueblo
- Type: Daily newspaper
- Format: Broadsheet
- Owner: USA Today Co.
- Founder(s): Dr. Michael Beshoar; Sam A. McBride
- Publisher: Lee Bachlet
- Founded: 1868
- Language: English
- Headquarters: 825 West Sixth Street; Pueblo, Colorado 81002; United States
- ISSN: 2693-4825
- Website: chieftain.com

The Pueblo Chieftain is a daily newspaper published in Pueblo, Colorado.

== History ==
=== Early years (1868-1933) ===
Dr. Michael Beshoar, Chieftain co-founder

==== Founding ====
On June 1, 1868, the first weekly edition of The Colorado Chieftain was published. It was founded by 35-year-old Dr. Michael Beshoar, who had previously founded two other newspapers and a drug store. Brothers John A. and Mahlon D. Thatcher, founders of Pueblo's First National Bank, financed the paper and Wilbur Fisk Stone was chosen as editor with George A. Hinsdale as his assistant. Moses Hallett was another member of the editorial team.

Samuel A. "Sam" McBride was the paper's first printer. He previously worked at the Colorado Transcript and after getting sick, agreed to work work at and help finance the Chieftain in exchange for medical care, half the profits and co-ownership. McBride left the paper after Dec. 31, 1868, due to poor health. Beshoar then acted as printer until selling the paper to McBride on Feb. 25, 1869. McBride sole managed the paper for the next 18 months.

==== Expansion ====
On June 9, 1870, Capt. John J. Lambert, who was stationed at Fort Reynolds, bought the paper from McBride. On April 28, 1872, Lambert expanded the Chieftain from a weekly into a daily. In 1874, the Chieftain bought and absorbed a rival paper called the Pueblo People. In February 1903, Lambert sold the paper to Isaac N. Stevens and C.V. Barton, who sold the Colorado Springs Gazette to finance the purchase.

In June 1907, Walter L. Wilder and J.A. Barclay joined Stevens as co-owners. In March 1911, Stevens leased the paper to a group of local investors. In June 1913, Frederick A. Marvin and George T. Harbrich, owners of the Pueblo Leader, subleased the Chieftain, and then consolidated the two papers. In June 1914, Stevens signed a new lease agreement with Marvin and Harbrich. In December 1915, Stevens sold the paper to G.G. Withers, Wilder and Alva A. Swain. Withers would be business manager while the other two editors and managers.

In August 1925, George H. "Buck" Sweeney became a co-owner with Withers. It was rumored Alva B. Adams bought a controlling interest, which he denied. In January 1926, the paper's printers went on strike demanding a $3 wage increase.

=== Hoag family (1933-2018) ===
In 1933, Frank S. Hoag, Sr. owner of the Pueblo Star-Journal, purchased the Chieftain, but the two papers continued to publish separately. In 1947, his son Frank S. Hoag, Jr. took over as publisher. In February 1963, his mother, Louise M. (Allebrand) Hoag, died at age 90, and his father, F.S. Hoag, Sr. died a month later at age 91.

In 1980, Hoag, Jr. retired and was succeeded as publisher by his nephew, Robert Hoag Rawlings. In 1984, the Star-Journal was absorbed into the Chieftain. In 1989, Hoag, Jr. died at age 81. Aside from operating the paper, his other major accomplishment was being of the founders of Pueblo Community College. His estate bequest $100,000 to the school.

In 2016, R.H. Rawlings retired and was succeeded by his daughter, Jane Rawlings, and later that year it was announced she would be inducted into the Pueblo Hall of Fame. In 2017, R.H. Rawlings died at age 92.

=== Corporate ownership (2018-present) ===
In 2018, GateHouse Media acquired the Chieftain from the Rawlings family. In 2019, Gatehouse acquired Gannett and merged under the Gannett name. In 2023, the paper's printing plant closed and printing was contracted out to The Denver Post. Around 50 employees at the plant were laid off. The remaining journalists at the paper kept their jobs, but lost their office. In 2024, the Chieftain announced it will switch from carrier to postal delivery. In 2025, Gannett was renamed to USA Today Co.
