= George A. Luxford =

American judge (1876–1956)

George Alfred Luxford (November 16, 1876 – April 14, 1956) was an associate justice of the Colorado Supreme Court from 1947 to 1949.

Born in LaSalle, Illinois, Luxford became a Colorado district court judge, from which position he announced his candidacy for the state supreme court in July 1946.

He lost his 1948 bid for reelection, in a political sweep in which almost all Republicans in statewide offices lost their elections, serving until the end of his term in January 1949. Luxford died at St. Joseph's Hospital in Denver, Colorado, at the age of 79.

Political offices
Preceded by Norris Conroy Bakke	Justice of the Colorado Supreme Court; 1947–1949	Succeeded by E. V. Holland
