= Victor A. Elliott =

American judge (1839–1899)

Associate Justice of the Colorado Supreme Court
- In office December 4, 1888 – January 1895

Personal details
- Born: July 23, 1839 Richmond, Pennsylvania, United States
- Died: February 5, 1899 (aged 59)
- Occupation: Judge

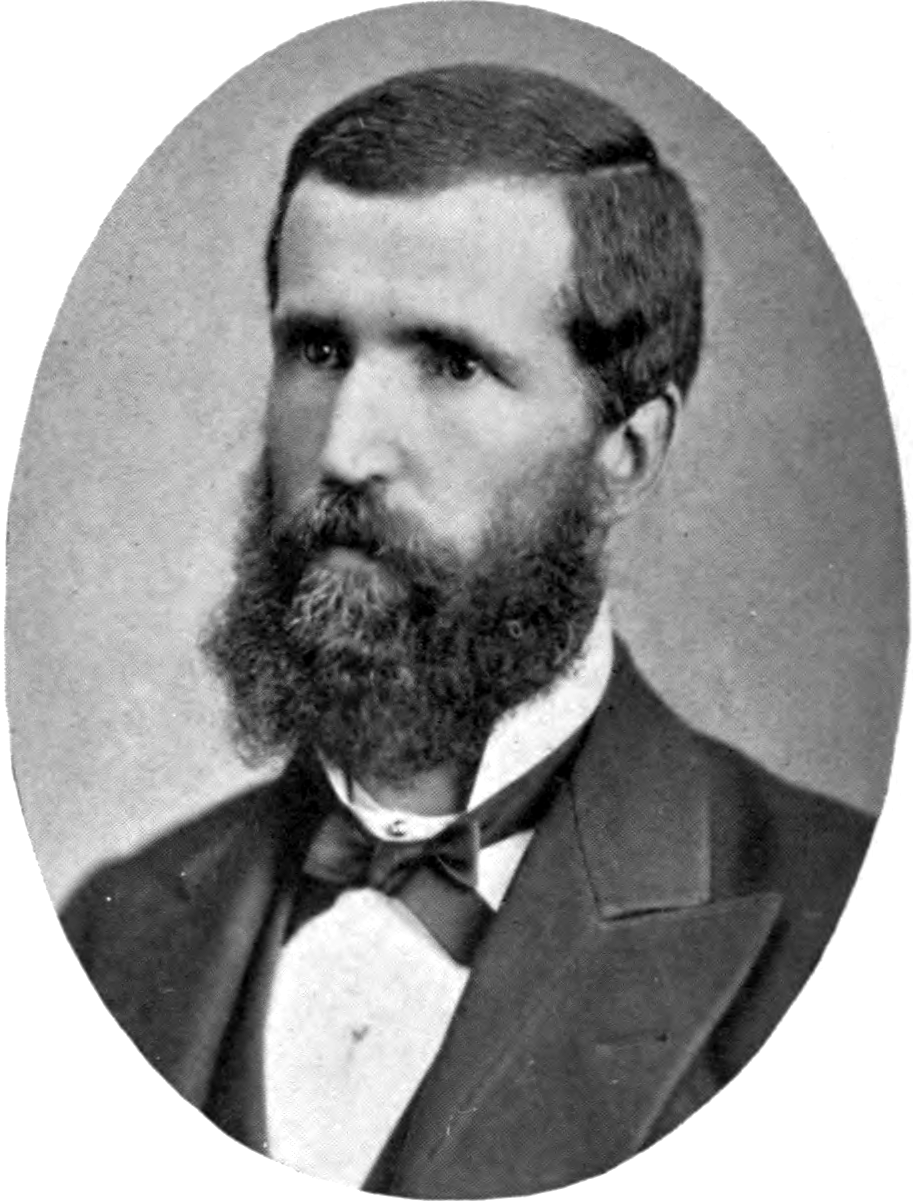
Judge Victor A. Elliott

Victor Alanson Elliott (July 23, 1839 – February 5, 1899) was an associate justice of the Colorado Supreme Court from 1888 to 1895.

== Early life ==
Elliott was born in Richmond, Pennsylvania on July 23, 1839. He earned a law degree at the University of Michigan at Ann Arbor.

He fought in the Civil War, achieving the rank of major, and relocated to Colorado after the war ended.

== Career in Colorado ==
Elliott had a law practice in Denver. Following Colorado's admission to the Union in 1876, he was elected to serve as the first judge of Colorado's Second Judicial District. He was re-elected to the office in 1882, serving for almost twelve years before being elected associate justice of the supreme court.

Elliott was elected to the Supreme Court in fall 1888 and served as an associate justice from December 4, 1888, to January 1895.

== Death ==
Elliott died on February 5, 1899, aged 59, in Denver.

Political offices
Preceded by Samuel Hitt Elbert	Justice of the Colorado Supreme Court; 1888–1895	Succeeded by John Campbell
