= Richard L. Gabriel =

American judge (born 1962)

Richard Gabriel
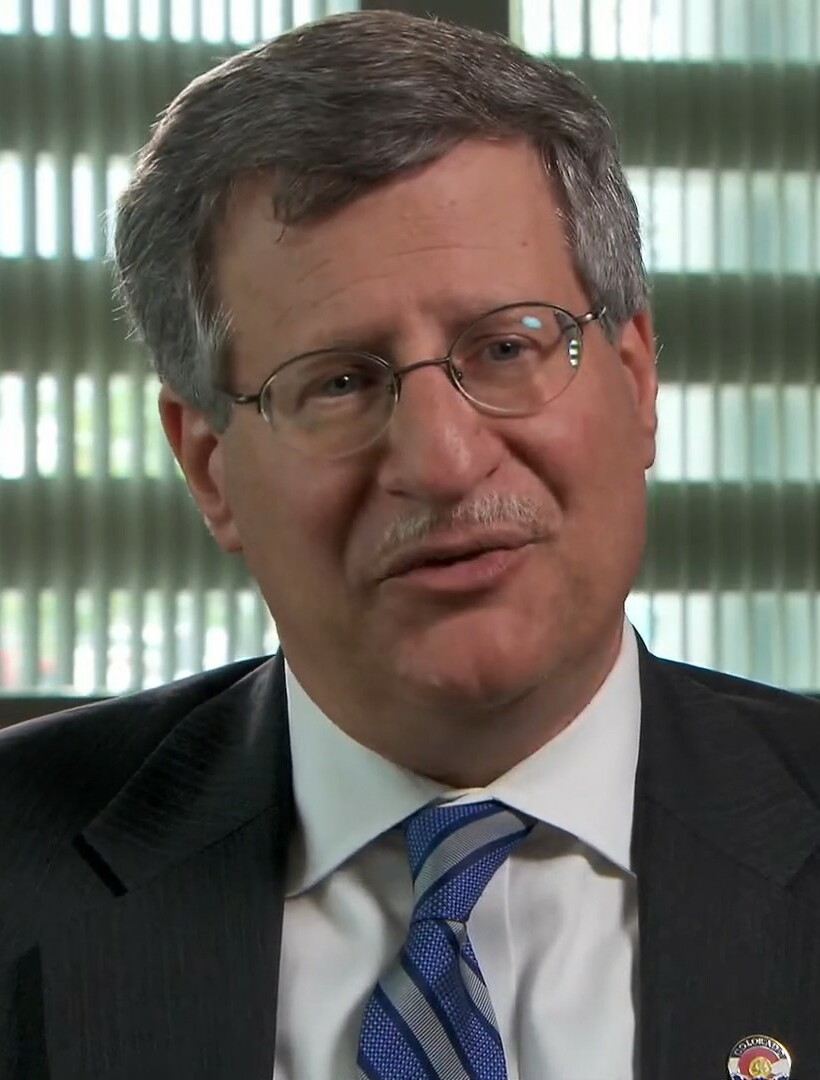

Associate Justice of the Colorado Supreme Court
- Incumbent
- Assumed office September 1, 2015
- Appointed by: John Hickenlooper
- Preceded by: Gregory J. Hobbs Jr.

Personal details
- Born: March 3, 1962 (age 64) New York City, New York, U.S.
- Education: Yale University (BA); University of Pennsylvania (JD)

Richard L. Gabriel (born March 3, 1962) was an American lawyer and judge, who is an associate justice of the Colorado Supreme Court. He previously served on the Colorado Court of Appeals from 2008 to 2015.

== Education and early career ==
Gabriel was born in Brooklyn, New York City, in 1962, and was one of seven children. He received a Bachelor of Arts in American studies in 1984 at Yale University, and received a Juris Doctor in 1987 at the University of Pennsylvania Law School, where he was articles editor for the University of Pennsylvania Law Review from 1986 to 1987.

Gabriel clerked for Judge J. Frederick Motz of the United States District Court for the District of Maryland from 1987 to 1988. He worked in private practice in New York City from 1988 to 1990. Gabriel moved to Colorado in 1990, because of a job offered to his wife, and was an associate and then a partner at a law firm in Denver from 1994 to 2008. Gabriel's wife, Jill Wichlens, is an attorney with the Federal public defender's office in Denver.

Gabriel specialized in business law, including commercial litigation and intellectual property law. He also served as city prosecutor for Lafayette, Colorado for several years. In 2007, Gabriel was named the Intellectual Property Lawyer of the Year by Law Week Colorado.

== Judicial service ==
Colorado Governor Bill Ritter announced in May 2008 that Gabriel would be appointed to the Colorado Court of Appeals, and he was sworn in as a judge on June 30. He was retained in a retention election in November 2010, winning 65.9 per cent of the vote.

In March 2015, Justice Gregory J. Hobbs Jr. announced that he would retire effective from September 1, 2015. The Colorado Judicial Nominating Commission selected Gabriel as one of three possible candidates to replace Hobbs. The other two candidates were University of Colorado Law School professor Melissa Hart and El Paso County District Court Judge David Prince. Governor John Hickenlooper announced Gabriel as his choice to replace Hobbs on June 23, 2015.

In May 2017, Justice Gabriel concurred in judgment when finding that imposing an eighty-four year sentence on a fifteen-year-old murderer did not violate the Constitution’s Eighth Amendment prohibition on sentencing juveniles to life without parole because the child might live through the end of his sentence.

Gabriel was retained by voters in a 2018 retention election.

Legal offices
Preceded by Gregory J. Hobbs Jr.	Associate Justice of the Colorado Supreme Court; 2015–present	Incumbent
