= Amherst W. Stone =

American judge (1824–1900)

Amherst Willoughby Stone

Associate Justice of the Colorado Territorial Supreme Court
- In office March 1, 1875 – 1876
- Preceded by: Ebenezer T. Wells
- Succeeded by: Office disestablished

Personal details
- Born: 1824
- Died: July 17, 1900 (aged 76) Leadville, Colorado, U.S.
- Resting place: Fairmount Cemetery, Denver, Colorado, U.S.
- Spouse: Cyrena Bailey (m. 1850–1868)
- Occupation: Lawyer, judge

Amherst Willoughby Stone (1824 – July 17, 1900) was an associate justice of the Colorado Territorial Supreme Court from 1875 to 1876.

== Early life, education, and career ==
A native of Vermont, Stone was admitted to the bar in 1848 in Franklin County, Vermont, having read law in St. Albans with Judge Homer E. Royce. In 1848 he migrated to Georgia, ending up first in Fayetville, 25 miles south of Atlanta. There, he married Vermont native Cyrena Bailey (1830-1868) in 1850 and moved to Atlanta where he and his wife were successful both financially and socially, despite being northerners. The story of the couple's lives in Atlanta is told in the 1999 book Secret Yankees: the Union circle in Confederate Atlanta.

Stone left Atlanta in 1863, but his wife remained. He had difficulty passing through confederate lines but made it to New York only to learn all his possessions had been burned.

In January 1864, he was arrested and jailed in New York "on suspicion of being a rebel emissary." Incarcerated at Fort Lafayette until July of that year, he was released without trial. Stone sat out the remainder of the Civil War in Vermont.

After the war, he practiced law in Savannah, Georgia, later becoming a judge there. He returned to private practice in Savannah for a time and then moved to Colorado in 1873.

== Appointment to the court ==
President Ulysses S. Grant appointed Stone to the Colorado Territorial Supreme Court on March 1, 1875. He was the last judge appointed in Colorado territory before its admission to the union when state judges replaced the territorial ones, and it was said that he "served without distinction or scandal." Stone was appointed to replace Judge Ebenezer T. Wells.

== Kidnapping ==
The Colorado Central Railroad, because of the poor economy at the time, fell behind on the interest payments it owed on the rolling stock it had purchased from railroad magnate and financier Jay Gould. Gould wanted to take over the railroad, so he planned to petition the court to place the railroad in receivership, with David Moffat as the receiver.

In August 1876, to prevent the railroad from going into receivership, a group of men with direct and indirect interests in the railroad decided to kidnap the judge to prevent him from appointing a receiver for the railroad. The judge was Amherst W. Stone, and the court was a circuit court that met only once every three or four months. Stone's court was to hear the case in Boulder, Colorado. The kidnappers stopped the train he was riding from Denver to court in Boulder, removing the judge from the train at gunpoint.

The National Guard was sent out from Denver, but by then the court clerk had closed the court because of the judge's absence, so the kidnappers brought Judge Stone back to Denver and released him. A grand jury was convened and met twice, but the kidnapped judge was only able to identify one man, and he had skipped town, so the grand jury never issued any indictments. The scheme worked, as the railroad was then able to secure funding to pay its debts, so it was saved from bankruptcy.

== Last years and death ==
Stone moved to Leadville in 1878. There, he was appointed county judge of Lake County, Colorado in April 1900 to fill a vacancy created by the previous judge's death. He died of throat cancer on July 17, 1900.

Political offices
Preceded by Ebenezer T. Wells	Justice of the Colorado Supreme Court; 1875–1876	Succeeded by Office disestablished
