= Luis D. Rovira =

American judge (1923–2011)

Luis Dario Rovira (September 8, 1923 – October 30, 2011) was an associate justice of the Colorado Supreme Court from 1979 to 1995.

== Education and career ==
Born in Puerto Rico and raised in New York City, Roviro received an undergraduate degree from the University of Colorado, followed by a J.D. from the University of Colorado Law School. He served in the United States Army during World War II.

In December 1978, Governor Richard Lamm announced that Rovira was being appointed to a seat on the state supreme court vacated by the retirement of Justice Donald E. Kelley, with the appointment to take effect February 1, 1979. Lamm was a Democrat, but appointed the Republican Roviro.

In 1990, Rovira was unanimously elected chief justice by his fellow justices.

Roviro retired from the bench in 1995. He was succeeded on the court by the appointment of Rebecca Love Kourlis, and as chief justice by associate justice Anthony Vollack.

== Personal life ==
Rovira married Bette Kingdon and they had a daughter and son. They later divorced, after which he married Lois Ann Thau, with whom he would remain for 45 years, until his death.

Political offices
| Preceded by Donald E. Kelley | Justice of the Colorado Supreme Court; 1979–1995 | Succeeded by Rebecca Love Kourlis |
