= Rebecca Love Kourlis =

American judge (born 1952)

- Justice Kourlis on the campus of the University of Denver in 2016

Justice of the Colorado Supreme Court
- In office May 1995 – January 10, 2006
- Appointed by: Roy Romer
- Preceded by: Luis D. Rovira
- Succeeded by: Allison H. Eid

Personal details
- Born: Rebecca Love Kourlis; November 11, 1952 (age 73) Colorado Springs, Colorado
- Parent(s): John Arthur Love, Ann Daniels
- Education: Stanford University (BA, JD)

Rebecca Love Kourlis (born 1952) is a former justice of the Colorado Supreme Court.

== Early life and education ==
Kourlis was born in Colorado Springs, Colorado, and is the daughter of former Governor John Arthur Love. She received her primary school education at Graland Country Day School in Denver, class of 1967. In 1973, she graduated with distinction from Stanford University and in 1976 earned a Juris Doctor degree from Stanford Law School.

== Career ==
Kourlis started her career at the Denver law firm of Davis Graham & Stubbs and later set up a private practice in Craig, Colorado.

Kourlis was appointed to the state Supreme Court in May 1995 by Democratic Governor Roy Romer. She previously served as a district court judge and worked in private practice in Colorado. She was mentioned as a potential nominee of George W. Bush to the U.S. Supreme Court by Senator Ken Salazar. On December 5, 2005, she announced her retirement from the Colorado Supreme Court effective January 10, 2006. In January 2006, she became Executive Director of University of Denver Institute for the Advancement of the American Legal System.

== Awards ==
- American Bar Association (ABA) Justice Center's John Marshall Award, 2012
- Citizens of the West, 2010 (Awarded with Tom Kourlis)
- ABA Yegge Award for Outstanding Contribution in the Field of Judicial Administration, 2009
- Regis University Civis Princeps Award, 2008
- Colorado Judicial Institute's Judicial Independence Award, 2006

== Personal life ==
Kourlis is married to Thomas A. Kourlis, a rancher and former commissioner of agriculture for the state of Colorado. They have three children.

== See also ==
- George W. Bush Supreme Court candidates
- List of justices of the Colorado Supreme Court
