= Morton Shelley Bailey =

American politician (1855–1922)

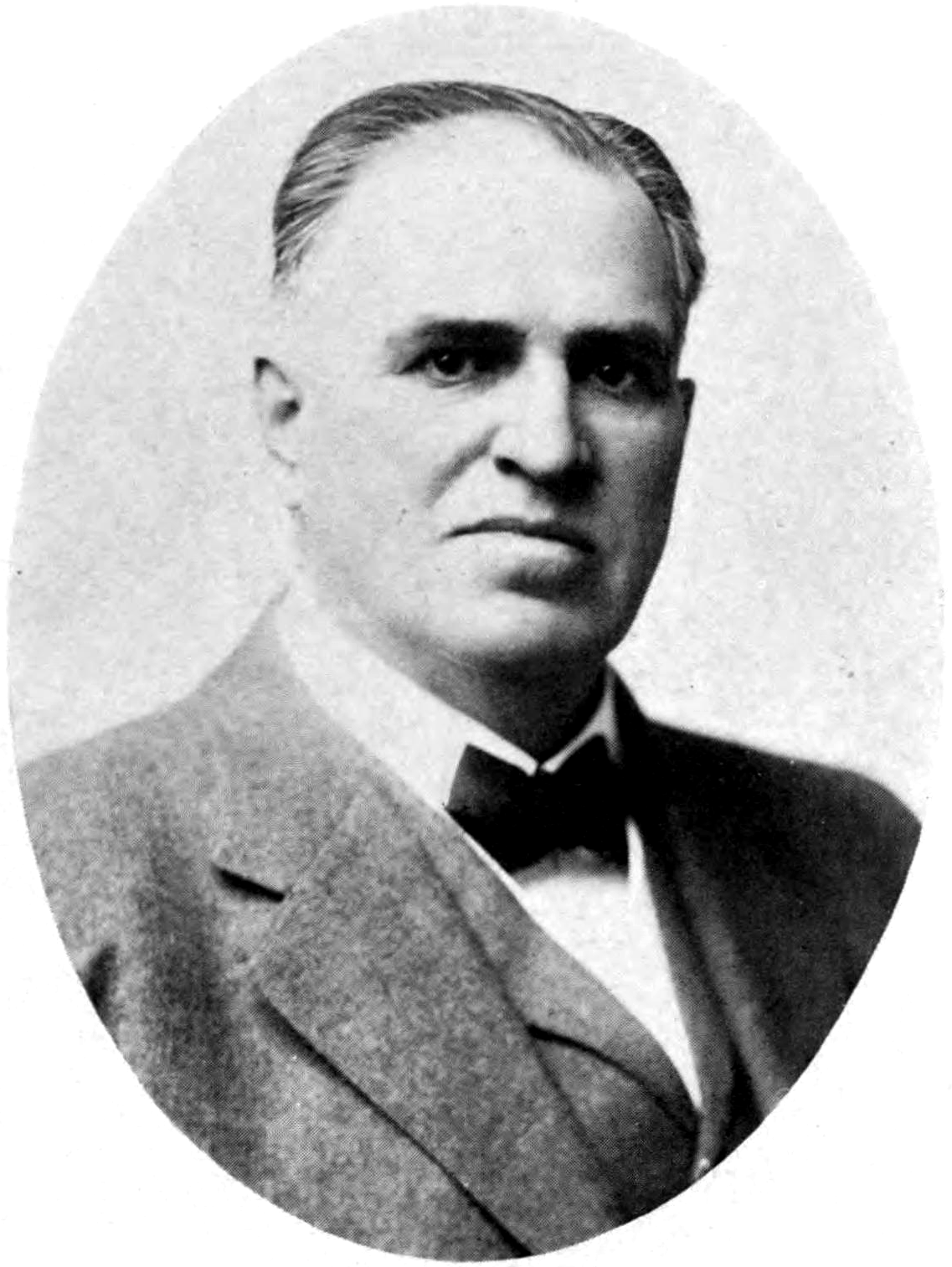
- Shelley Bailey in 1917

Associate Justice of the Colorado Supreme Court
- In office 1909–1922

Member of the Colorado Senate from the 14th district
- In office January 7, 1891 – January 3, 1893
- Preceded by: Jason A. McCandless
- Succeeded by: George E. Pease

Personal details
- Born: July 3, 1855 Charleston Township, Pennsylvania, US
- Died: May 16, 1922 (aged 66) Denver, Colorado, US
- Party: Democratic Party
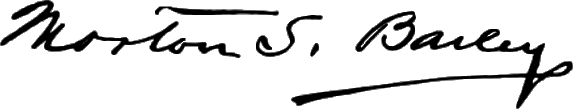
- Signature

Morton Shelley Bailey (July 3, 1855 – May 16, 1922) was an American politician who served in the Colorado Senate from the 14th district from 1891 to 1893 and as an Associate Justice of the Colorado Supreme Court from 1909 to 1922.

== Biography ==
Born in Wellsboro, Pennsylvania, Bailey received a Bachelor of Arts (A.B.) academic degree from the Lafayette College in Easton, Pennsylvania in 1880, and was admitted to the Colorado Bar as a practicing attorney-at-law in 1882. Bailey married Lutie Wilkin in Denver in September 1888. A decade later, he served as a judge of the Eleventh Judicial District of Colorado from 1892 to 1908.

Associate Justice Bailey died at his home in Denver on May 16, 1922. Then Governor of Colorado Oliver Henry Shoup appointed former justice John C. Campbell to his seat on the high court.

The Fox News Channel political commentator and program host Jesse Watters is a descendant through his mother, Justice Bailey's great-granddaughter, Anne Purvis Bailey.

Party political offices
Preceded by Davis Hanson Waite	Populist nominee for Governor of Colorado; 1896	Succeeded by None
Political offices
Preceded by Luther Marcellus Goddard	Justice of the Colorado Supreme Court; 1909–1922	Succeeded by John Campbell
