= Hilbert Schauer =

American judge (1852–1928)

Hilbert Schauer (April 2, 1920 – July 12, 2015) was a justice of the Colorado Supreme Court from 1965 to 1967.

== Early life, military service, and education ==
Born in Underwood, North Dakota, and raised on a farm near Tribune, Kansas, Schauer was drafted in the United States Army in 1942, achieving the rank of first lieutenant in the European theatre of World War II, where he "commanded a company of black soldiers" in the then-segregated military.

Schauer attended Southern Methodist University before receiving a B.A. from the University of Denver and a J.D. from the University of Denver College of Law.

== Legal career ==
After working for a time in the private practice of law, he served as a municipal judge, deputy district attorney, and assistant district attorney for Logan County, Colorado, before being elected to a seat as a Colorado District Court judge on December 14, 1958.

In December 1964, Schauer was one of several names suggested to Governor John Arthur Love to fill the vacancy created by the death of Justice Frank H. Hall. On January 15, 1965, Governor Love announced the appointment of Schauer, to serve until the next election. Schauer sought re-election in 1966, but was defeated, "finishing fifth in a field of six candidates competing for three positions".

Later in 1967, Schauer was named director of the newly established Colorado Bureau of Investigation based on his performance in a civil service examination. He later served as director of the state Department of Institutions, and as a United States magistrate judge. Schauer retire in 1991.

== Personal life and death ==
In 1947, Schauer married Jimmie Ruth Conner in Texas.

Schauer died at a hospice in Denver at the age of 95.

Political offices
Preceded by Frank H. Hall	Justice of the Colorado Supreme Court; 1965–1967	Succeeded by Donald E. Kelley
