= Allison H. Eid =

American judge (born 1965)

Allison Eid
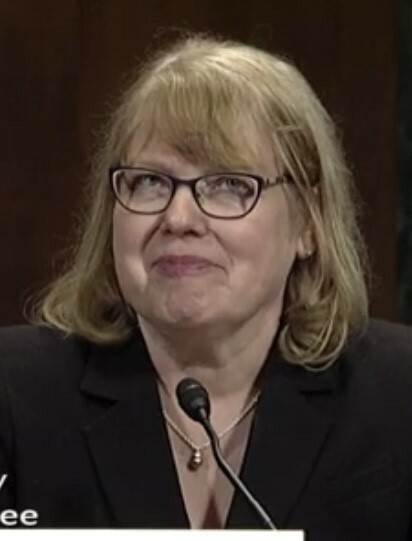

Judge of the United States Court of Appeals for the Tenth Circuit
- Incumbent
- Assumed office November 3, 2017
- Appointed by: Donald Trump
- Preceded by: Neil Gorsuch

Associate Justice of the Colorado Supreme Court
- In office March 13, 2006 – November 3, 2017
- Appointed by: Bill Owens
- Preceded by: Rebecca Love Kourlis
- Succeeded by: Melissa Hart

Solicitor General of Colorado
- In office 2005–2006
- Governor: Bill Owens
- Preceded by: Alan Gilbert
- Succeeded by: Daniel D. Domenico

Personal details
- Born: Allison Lynn Hartwell; 1965 (age 60–61) Seattle, Washington, U.S.
- Spouse: Troy Eid
- Education: University of Idaho (attended); Stanford University (BA); University of Chicago (JD)

Allison Lynn Hartwell Eid (born 1965) is an American lawyer who serves as a United States circuit judge of the United States Court of Appeals for the Tenth Circuit since 2017. She previously served as an associate justice of the Colorado Supreme Court from 2006 to 2017.

== Early life and education ==
Born in Seattle and raised in Spokane, Washington, by a single mother, Eid initially attended the University of Idaho before transferring to Stanford University, where she earned her Bachelor of Arts degree in American studies with distinction in 1987 and was a member of the Phi Beta Kappa honor society. After graduating, she served as a special assistant and speechwriter to President Ronald Reagan's secretary of education, William Bennett. She left the Department of Education to attend the University of Chicago Law School, where she was an articles editor of the University of Chicago Law Review. She graduated in 1991 with a Juris Doctor with high honors and was elected to the Order of the Coif.

== Career ==
After graduating from law school, Eid served as a law clerk for Judge Jerry Edwin Smith of the United States Court of Appeals for the Fifth Circuit and then for justice Clarence Thomas of the Supreme Court of the United States. After completing her clerkships, she went on to become a commercial and appellate litigator at the law firm of Arnold & Porter. In 1998, she left Arnold & Porter to serve as an associate professor of law at the University of Colorado Law School, where she taught courses on constitutional law, torts, and federalism.

=== Colorado Solicitor General and Supreme Court of Colorado service ===
In 2002, President George W. Bush appointed Eid to serve on the Permanent Committee for the Oliver Wendell Holmes Devise, which writes the history of the U.S. Supreme Court and sponsors the Oliver Wendell Holmes Lecture. In 2005, Republican Colorado attorney general John Suthers appointed Eid to serve as Solicitor General of Colorado. A year later, Colorado governor Bill Owens appointed Eid to serve as the 95th justice of the Colorado Supreme Court on February 15, 2006. She took office on March 13, 2006. In 2008, 75% of Colorado voters voted to retain Eid on the Supreme Court.

In May 2017, Eid found that imposing an eighty-four year sentence on a fifteen-year-old murderer did not violate the Constitution's Eighth Amendment prohibition on sentencing juveniles to life without parole because the punishment was styled as an aggregate term-of-years sentence. In May 2016, she was included on President Donald Trump's list of potential Supreme Court justices.

=== Federal judicial service ===
On June 7, 2017, President Donald Trump nominated Eid to serve as a United States circuit judge of the United States Court of Appeals for the Tenth Circuit, to the seat vacated by Judge Neil Gorsuch, who was elevated to the United States Supreme Court. On September 20, 2017, a hearing on her nomination was held before the Senate Judiciary Committee. On October 26, 2017, her nomination was reported out of committee by an 11–9 vote. On November 1, 2017, the United States Senate invoked cloture on her nomination by a 56–42 vote. On November 2, 2017, her nomination was confirmed by a 56–41 vote. She received her judicial commission the next day. She sworn in on November 4, 2017.

== Personal life ==
Eid met her husband, Troy Eid, when he was standing in line at a Stanford University dorm cafeteria while she was working as a student food service worker and he was editor-in-chief of the student newspaper, The Stanford Daily; she later said: "It was love at first sight in the meal card line." In 2006, a few months after Allison Eid was appointed to the Colorado Supreme Court, President George W. Bush appointed Troy Eid as the 41st United States attorney for the District of Colorado and the first Egyptian-American U.S. attorney in the country's history. The Eids reside in Morrison, Colorado, with their son Alex and daughter Emily.

== Selected scholarly works ==
- Eid, Allison H. (2003). "Federalism and Formalism". William & Mary Bill of Rights Journal. 11 (3): 1191–1237.
- Eid, Allison H. (2004). "The Property Clause and New Federalism". University of Colorado Law Review. 75 (4): 1241–1260.
- Eid, Allison H. (2005). "Preemption and the Federalism Five". Rutgers Law Journal. 37 (1): 1–38.

== Electoral history ==
2008

Colorado Supreme Court – Retain Allison H. Eid, November 4, 2008
Party	Candidate	Votes	%
Nonpartisan	Yes	1,338,571	74.58%
Nonpartisan	No	456,337	25.42%
Majority		882,234	49.16%
Total votes		1,794,908	100.00%

== See also ==
- List of justices of the Colorado Supreme Court
- List of law clerks for the tenth seat of the Supreme Court of the United States
- Donald Trump Supreme Court candidates

Legal offices
Preceded by Rebecca Kourlis	Associate Justice of the Colorado Supreme Court; 2006–2017	Succeeded by Melissa Hart
Preceded by Neil Gorsuch	Judge of the United States Court of Appeals for the Tenth Circuit; 2017–present	Incumbent
