= Susan Blanco =

American judge (born 1977 or 1978)

Associate Justice of the Colorado Supreme Court
- Incumbent
- Assumed office February 17, 2026
- Appointed by: Jared Polis
- Preceded by: Melissa Hart

Personal details
- Born: 1977 or 1978 (age 48–49)
- Education: Colorado State University (BS); University of Colorado, Boulder (JD); Duke University (LLM)

Susan Blanco (born 1977 or 1978) is an American attorney who has served as a justice of the Colorado Supreme Court since 2026, when she was appointed by Governor Jared Polis. She previously served as the chief judge of Colorado's 8th Judicial District from 2021 to 2026. She is the first Iranian-American to serve on a state supreme court.

== Biography ==
Blanco assumed a seat on the Eighth Judicial District, which serves Larimer County and Jackson County, in January 2017 and went on to become the chief judge of the district in 2021. She was the first woman to serve as chief judge of that district.

The Colorado Supreme Court Nominating Commission announced that she was one of the three finalists for the open seat in the Colorado Supreme Court on February 5, 2026. On February 17, 2026, Governor Jared Polis officially appointed her to the open seat, emphasizing her innovation, excellence, creativity, and hard work. In her speech after receiving the appointment, she spoke about how she is the daughter of immigrants and how her heart grieves for extended family in the Middle East who don't enjoy the same protections of the rule of law.

Her first opinion as a justice was a concurrence in conclusion, but sided with the dissent in the judicial principles, that a court can only bring up issues that have been brought before them by the parties.

The Iranian-American Bar Association has announced they will award her their 2026 "Trailblazer" award for being the first Iranian-American on a state supreme court in the United States.

Legal offices
Preceded by Melissa Hart	Associate Justice of the Colorado Supreme Court; 2026–present	Incumbent
