= Andrew W. Brazee =

American judge (1826–1891)

Andrew Washburne Brazee (December 27, 1826 – September 1, 1891) was a jurist from New York and Colorado. He served as an associate justice of the Colorado's territorial Supreme Court from 1875 to 1876.

== Early life ==
Brazee was born in Niagara County, New York, on December 27, 1826. During the Civil War, he volunteered for the 49th New York Volunteer Infantry, serving from August 1, 1861, to October 18, 1864, and rising to the rank of Major.

== Career ==
He worked as an assistant United States attorney in the Northern District of New York before he relocated to Colorado and began a private law practice in Denver. On February 24, 1875 President Ulysses S. Grant appointed him associate justice of the territorial Colorado Supreme Court, a position he held until 1876 when the first state supreme court justices were elected and sworn in following Colorado's admission to the Union.

Brazee succeeded Judge James B. Belford on the territorial Supreme Court. After serving on the supreme court, he became a partner in a Denver law firm.

Brazee was appointed U.S. Attorney for Colorado on September 5, 1882. He served in this position until May 1886.

== Death ==
Judge Brazee died on September 1, 1891, following a bout of difficulty breathing.
