= Melville B. Gerry =

American judge

Melville B. Gerry (1843—1912) was a jurist from Colorado. He served as an associate justice of the Colorado Supreme Court from 1888 to 1889.

== Early life ==
Gerry was born in Florida in November 1843. In 1869, he was admitted to the bar in Macon, Georgia. Relocating to Colorado, Gerry settled in Denver in 1873. In 1875, he moved south to Pueblo and practiced law there for two years. Then, in 1877, he moved to Lake City, Colorado.

== Judicial career ==
In 1882, he was elected judge of Colorado's Seventh Judicial District. While serving as the Seventh District Court Judge in Lake City, Gerry presided over the trial of accused cannibal Alferd Packer.

On September 13, 1888 Gerry was appointed by the governor to fill the Supreme Court vacancy created by the resignation of Samuel Hitt Elbert. He served in the position until 1889.

In 1900, Gerry ran for the office of Judge of the Seventh Judicial District — the judgeship he held before serving on the State Supreme Court — but he lost the election.

== Death ==
Melville Gerry died in 1912 in Biloxi, Mississippi.
