= George H. Bradfield =

American judge (1880–1961)

Justice of the Colorado Supreme Court
- In office 1953–1957
- Preceded by: Frank L. Hays
- Succeeded by: Edward C. Day Jr.

Greeley city attorney
- In office 1925–1929

Judge of the Colorado 8th Judicial District
- In office 1918–1925

Personal details
- Born: March 24, 1880 Delta, Louisiana, U.S.
- Died: October 19, 1961 (aged 81)
- Education: TMI Episcopal; Sturm College of Law

George H. Bradfield (March 24, 1880 – October 19, 1961) was an associate justice of the Colorado Supreme Court from 1953 to 1957.

== Education and early career ==
Born in Delta, Louisiana, Bradfield attended West Texas Military Academy in San Antonio (later renamed TMI Episcopal), and received his law degree from Denver University Law School. He entered the practice of law in Ault, Colorado. He also founded a weekly newspaper, the Ault Progress, which ran for two years, after which Bradfield moved to Greeley, Colorado.

== Judicial service ==
In 1908, Bradfield was elected as a judge of the Weld County Court, where he remained until 1912.

He was a district judge of the Colorado 8th Judicial District from 1918 to 1925, and then Greeley city attorney from 1925 to 1929. He sought election as a Republican to the United States House of Representatives three times, in 1932, 1934, and 1936. Bradfield was the Republican nominee for Colorado's 2nd congressional district each time, losing to Democrat Fred N. Cummings in each effort. In the 1932 United States House of Representatives elections, Cummings defeated Bradfield 52.9% to 47.1%; in the 1934 United States House of Representatives elections, Cummings defeated Bradfield 55.9% to 42.4%; and in the 1936 United States House of Representatives elections, Cummings defeated Bradfield 53.3% to 45.8%.

Bradfield was again a district judge from 1942 to 1952, before defeating Frank H. Hall to win the Republican nomination, and William E. Doyle to win the general election for a seat on the state supreme court in 1952. Bradfield sought re-election in 1956, but was eliminated from contention for the party nomination in a four-way primary contest.

== Personal life and death ==
On November 15, 1904, Bradfield married Meddie Edmonson in Kansas City, Missouri, with whom he had a son and two daughters. He died at Weld County General Hospital after being struck by a car while walking in Greeley, Colorado, at the age of 80.

Political offices
Preceded by Frank L. Hays	Justice of the Colorado Supreme Court; 1953–1957	Succeeded by Edward C. Day Jr.
