= Charles Frederick Holly =

American judge (1819–1901)

Charles Frederick Holly (September 4, 1819 – September 7, 1901) was an associate justice of the Colorado Territorial Supreme Court from June 10, 1865, to July 19, 1866. He and William H. Gale were jointly appointed by President Andrew Johnson.

== Early life ==
A native of Connecticut, Holly graduated from Kenyon College in Ohio. After graduation, he studied law privately with Henry Stanbery and Thomas Ewing, Sr. in Ohio. In 1842, he moved to Missouri, practiced law there and served as a probate court judge, and then moved to the Territory of Nebraska in the 1850s and practiced law from 1857 to 1860. He moved to Colorado in 1860 and was elected to Colorado's first territorial legislature, serving as the first speaker of the House of Representatives of Colorado Territory.

== Later life ==
During the American Civil War, Holly served in the Union Army as part of the 2nd Colorado Cavalry Regiment.

A grand jury indicted him for adultery in 1866, but the charges were eventually withdrawn.

Holly's wife, Carrie C. Holly, and two other women were the first women elected to a state legislature in the United States. The three were elected on November 6, 1894, and served in the Colorado House of Representatives from 1895 to 1896. Carrie C. Holly represented Pueblo in the state house.

Holly died on September 7, 1901, three days after his 82nd birthday, in Beulah, Colorado.
