= Otto Bock (judge) =

American judge

Otto Bock (February 21, 1881 – August 15, 1942) was a justice of the Colorado Supreme Court.

== Biography ==
Bock was born and raised in Milwaukee, Wisconsin. He graduated from the John Marshall Law School. On August 24, 1911, Bock married Hilda Helen Schabarum. They had three children. Bock died on August 15, 1942, in Denver, Colorado. He was a Lutheran.

== Career ==
Bock served on the State Supreme Court from 1939 until his death. He was succeeded on the court by Frank B. Goudy. Previously, Bock was an Assistant United States Attorney.
