= Charles Lee Armour =

American judge (1830–1903)

Charles Lee Armour (1830–October 16, 1903) was an associate justice of the supreme court of Colorado Territory from 1861 to 1865.

== Biography ==
When Colorado Territory was first organized in 1861, President Lincoln appointed three men to organize and serve on the new Colorado Supreme Court. Armour, whose appointment became official on March 28, 1861, was one of two associate justices Lincoln appointed. The other was S. Newton Pettis. Benjamin F. Hall was Lincoln's choice for the first chief justice of Colorado Territory. The territory was divided into three judicial districts, one headquartered in Denver, one in Central City, Colorado, and one in Cañon City. Armour was ultimately assigned to the district based in Central City.

Armour was from Maryland (though some sources erroneously say Ohio), and little is known about his early life. He was sympathetic to the Confederacy. He didn't travel to his post in Central City from Denver until 1862 and immediately proved unpopular there, with citizens petitioning the government for his removal. His courtroom behavior was strange and tyrannical. For example, he required everyone being sworn in his court to kiss a dirty old bible. He also jailed his bailiff once for saying too many "hear ye's" when court opened. One, lawyer, whose client Armour had unfairly treated, even posted flyers around Central City calling Armour a "judicial vagabond" and "a liar and a coward."

Eventually, the territorial legislature solved the Armour problem by creating a new, small, and remote judicial district and assigning him to it. The district consisted only of Conejos and Costilla counties, both in far southern Colorado along the New Mexico border. He never traveled there, preferring instead to sit out the war in Denver or Central City and draw his salary until his term ended in 1865, when he returned to Maryland. His annual salary was $1,800.

Little is known of Armour's life after his return to Maryland, except for one mention in The Maryland Free Press in 1866. He was appointed register of voters in Leitersburg but refused to register anyone who would not vote with the Radical Republicans. Of Armour, the newspaper wrote:

This man, with a full knowledge of the law and constitution, has nevertheless so far yielded to that love of meanness which has always disgraced his character, and which has rendered him a moral and social stench wherever he is known, as to utterly refuse to register any one unless he votes the Radical ticket. And, in order to drive away all others has invented a system of badgering, brow-beating and overbearing conduct, of which the vilest man on earth should feel ashamed.

In 1868, he was reported as being one of the speakers at a Radical convention in Pennsylvania, delivering a speech that was "full of abuse and brag", and "seemed to be boiling over with rage towards the Copperheads".

== Death ==
Armour died following a sudden stroke in October 1903, and is buried in Saint Paul's Lutheran Church Cemetery in Leitersburg, Maryland.
