= George W. Allen (judge) =

American judge (1844–1928)

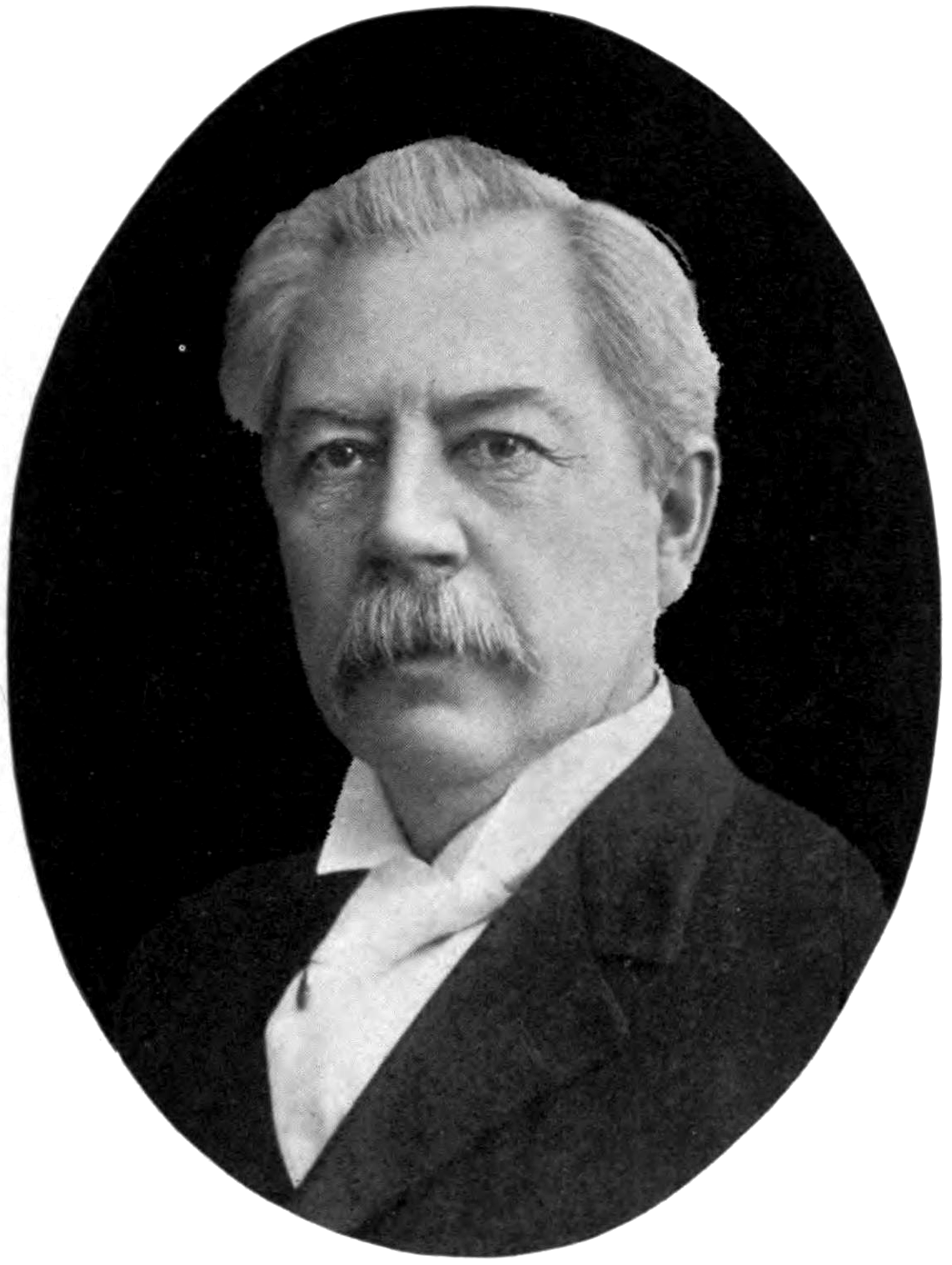
George W. Allen, c. 1917

George W. Allen (March 26, 1844 – January 28, 1928) was an American politician and lawyer who served as an associate justice of the Colorado Supreme Court from 1917 to 1925, and chief justice from 1925 to 1927.

== Early life, education, and career ==
Born in Pine Grove Township, Warren County, Pennsylvania, to Samuel P. and Mary E. Allen, Allen served in the Union Army during the American Civil War. An older brother, Harrison Allen, was an officer in the same conflict, achieving the rank of brevet brigadier general. Allen thereafter read law in the office of Judge William P. Brown of Warren to gain admission to the bar in Pennsylvania in 1865.

He was elected as a district attorney in Warren County, Pennsylvania, and was elected as a Republican to represent Warren County in the Pennsylvania House of Representatives for the 1874, 1875, and 1876 terms. He was not a candidate for re-election to the 1877 term. In 1879, Allen decided to move west, and for a time was located at Leadville, Colorado, and at Fort Collins, Colorado, where he "immediately won prominence as a lawyer". In 1881 he moved to Denver.

== Judicial service ==
In 1888 he was elected to a district court seat in Denver and served until 1900. While serving in this position, he was an unsuccessful candidate in 1896 for both Governor of Colorado, and for a seat representing the state in the United States Senate. He returned to the private practice of law from 1900 to 1906, when he was again elected to the district bench. He served in this capacity until 1917, when he resigned to take the seat to which he had been elected as a justice of the state supreme court. In the 1916 elections he was the only Republican on the state ticket to be elected. He served as chief justice from 1925 to 1927, and sought reelection in 1927, but was not renominated by his party for the seat.

== Personal life and death ==
Allen was the father of two sons. He died at his home in Denver at the age of 83. He was interred at Fairmount Cemetery in Denver.

Political offices
Preceded by William H. Gabbert	Justice of the Colorado Supreme Court; 1917–1927	Succeeded by Charles C. Butler
