= John W. Sheafor =

American judge (1852–1928)

John W. Sheafor (March 9, 1852 – January 24, 1928) was an associate justice of the Colorado Supreme Court from 1923 until his death in 1928.

== Early life and career ==
Born in Manchester, Ohio, Sheofor lived in Iowa until he was 12 years old, and then in Kansas, where he attended the public schools. He read law on his own during his leisure time while teaching school, and gained admission to the bar in Kansas at the age of 21.

After practicing in Topeka, Kansas, for several years, and in Concordia, Kansas, for 18 years, where he served as a member of the Kansas state legislature for one term. In February 1898, Sheafor moved to Colorado Springs, Colorado, where he was city attorney from 1901 to 1905, and then served as an assistant district attorney.

== Judicial service ==
On May 7, 1906, Sheafor was appointed to a seat on the Colorado Fourth Judicial District, remaining in that office for seventeen years. In May 1922, Sheafor announced his candidacy for a ten-year term on the state supreme court. Sheafor won the Republican nomination in September 1922, and took office on the state supreme court on January 9, 1923, and remained there until his death.

== Personal life and death ==
Sheafor was married and had one daughter. He died at his home in Denver at the age of 75.

Political offices
| Preceded by Tully Scott | Justice of the Colorado Supreme Court; 1923–1928 | Succeeded by R. Hickman Walker |
