= Benjamin F. Hall =

American judge (1814–1891)

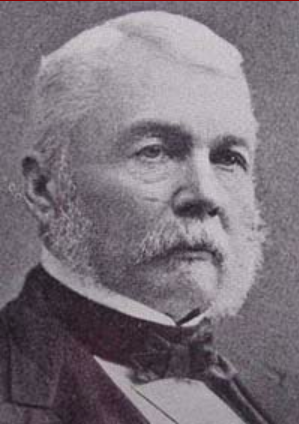

Chief justice of the Colorado Supreme Court
- In office 1861–1863
- Appointed by: Abraham Lincoln

Personal details
- Born: July 23, 1814 Whitehall, New York
- Died: September 6, 1891 (aged 77) Auburn, New York
- Party: Whig, then Republican Party
- Occupation: lawyer, politician, and judge from New York State who served as the first chief justice of the supreme court of Colorado Territory

Benjamin Franklin Hall (July 23, 1814 – September 6, 1891) was a lawyer, politician, and judge from New York State. He served as the first chief justice of the supreme court of Colorado Territory during the Civil War when there were disputes among those with strong opinions about secession from the Union.

He was the author of articles and books about history, including 14 volumes of Universal History. Hall was the first compiler and editor of the serial work Official opinions of the attorneys general of the United States. He published his 300-page treatise on the judicial and political economy of the Hebrew Commonwealth.

== Early life and education ==
Hall was born on July 23, 1814, in Whitehall, New York, to Asbury and Nancy Foster Hall. His father, Asbury, was born in Fairfield County, Connecticut, and in 1808 he moved to the Lake Champlain area of New York. He fought in the Battle of Plattsburg during the War of 1812. He married Nancy Foster from Windham County, Connecticut, in 1812. She was the daughter of Dan Foster of the Foster pioneers of Windham County. His mother died in the mid-1870s and his father died in 1879. Hall is in the seventh generation of descent from Francis Hall, one of the founders of the New Haven Colony. His Hall ancestors belonged the "Fairfield Line" of Halls in Connecticut.

He was the eldest son of ten children. As a child, he worked on his father's farm during planting and harvesting seasons and attended school when he was not needed on the farm. In addition to what he taught himself, he was tutored by two heads of local academies on the arts and sciences, history and languages. He taught school and studied law privately with help from a judge, John H. Parker. In 1835, he moved to Auburn, New York. Two years later he received an honorary Master of Arts degree from Hobart College, having impressed several of the faculty there with his wealth of knowledge. He read law with Judge Elijah Miller, of the law firm of Seward, Porter, and Beardsley. He was admitted to the state bar in 1839 and admitted to practice in federal courts in 1840.

== Career ==
=== Author ===
While he studied for the law, Hall wrote historical articles for a number of New York newspapers. He published a 300-page treatise on the judicial and political economy of the Hebrew Commonwealth. He wrote a condensed history of Canada that was first used as a schoolbook and was later inserted into Goodrich's Universal History. He wrote 14 volumes about history.

Hall was the first compiler and editor of the serial work Official opinions of the attorneys general of the United States. President Millard Fillmore appointed him to this task in 1850, and he completed the first six volumes.

=== Attorney, legislator, and politician ===
Hall became a partner of Seward, Porter, and Beardsley in 1837. He was appointed to a three-year term to be Examiner in Chancery by Governor William H. Seward in 1840. Hall established a law firm with John P. Hulbert in 1841.

A Whig, Hall served as a delegate to the party's national convention in 1844. He was elected assemblyman in the 67th New York State Legislature, which met from January 2 to May 7, 1844, representing Cayuga County. In 1846, He played a substantial part in preparing the New York Constitutional Convention. The same year, Hulbert was elected a county judge and Hall established a solo law practice that he ran until 1861. He served as the mayor of Auburn, New York, in 1852. He received an appointment as Superintendent of Commercial Statistics in the State Department after he returned from Colorado. He helped Secretary of State William H. Seward prepare for state visits with China and Russia. In 1864, he was made the first head of the Bureau of Immigration.

Over the course of his career, he helped to establish the Water Works, Fort Hill Cemetery, and Gas Light Company.

=== Chief justice of Colorado Supreme Court ===
In 1861, when Colorado Territory was first organized, President Abraham Lincoln appointed Hall the first Chief Justice of the Colorado Supreme Court. William H. Seward suggested the appointment. Hall went to Colorado to organize the court system there and to do what he could to prevent the Native Americans in Colorado from joining with the Confederates during the American Civil War. He was also tasked with ensuring safe passage of travelers through Colorado and to California.

He resigned his position after dealing with border disputes between Northern settlers and the secessionists. His stated reason was that the salary for the position was insufficient.

He never liked his profession very well, for the principal reason that it involves so much perplexity with the troubles and quarrels of others. He liked to investigate difficult cases, liked to prepare elaborate briefs, and like to submit delicate and intricate questions of law and equity to the courts; but he shrank instinctively from vindictive and wrangling legislation. That class of law business was uncongenial to his feelings, habits and tastes.

— E. G. Storke, on Benjamin J. Hall, History of Cayuga County

He returned to Auburn in 1863 or 1864. He was held in esteem in the territory for his efforts to quelch rebellion by southern sympathizers, including efforts by Captain McGee from Texas who was sent by General Henry Hopkins Sibley to recruit men for the Confederate Army. He also aptly managed claim-jumping and mining disputes. He had also organized an Episcopal church in Denver in 1862 and was its senior warden while he lived in Denver.

== Personal life ==
He married Abby Farnham, the daughter of John I. Hagaman of Auburn. They had ten children, seven daughters and three sons. His sons—Edward, James, and Henry—were journalists and authors.

Hall died in Auburn, New York, on September 6, 1891. He is buried at the Fort Hill Cemetery in Auburn, New York.
