= Henry Calvin Thatcher =

American judge (1842–1884)

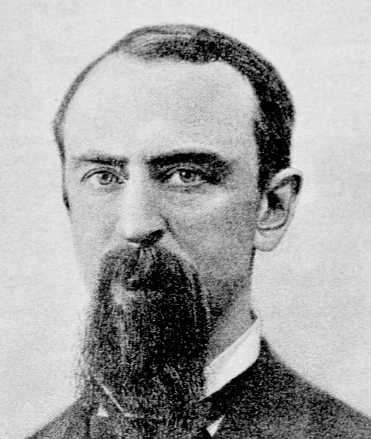
- Born: April 21, 1842; New Buffalo, Pennsylvania, US
- Died: March 20, 1884 (aged 41); San Francisco, California, US
- Education: Franklin & Marshall College; Albany Law School
- Occupation: Jurist
- Political party: Republican

Henry Calvin Thatcher (1842–1884) was the first chief justice of the Colorado Supreme Court. He served in the position from 1876 to 1879.

== Early life and education ==
Thatcher was born in New Buffalo, Pennsylvania on April 21, 1842. He attended Franklin & Marshall College and graduated in 1864. From there, he went to Albany Law School, where he earned a law degree in 1866. Upon graduating, he traveled to Colorado that same year.

== Career ==
At 24-years of age, he went to Pueblo and established a law practice there.

In 1869, President U.S. Grant appointed Thatcher to serve as United States Attorney for Colorado Territory. Thatcher resigned the position after serving a little more than a year and returned to private practice.

In 1876 he was elected as a Republican to the Colorado Supreme Court and immediately became the state's first chief justice. He got the position by luck. To create staggered terms for the state's first Supreme Court, one of the newly elected justices was to have a term of three years, the others having longer terms. However, the law stipulated that the person who drew the lot for the shorter term would become Chief Justice, and Thatcher drew the shorter straw.

== Death ==
Thatcher died of kidney failure in San Francisco on March 20, 1884, at 41. He is buried at Roselawn Cemetery in Pueblo.

Political offices
| Preceded by Position established | Chief Justice of the Colorado Supreme Court; 1876–1879 | Succeeded by Samuel Hitt Elbert |
