= Ebenezer T. Wells =

American judge (1835–1923)

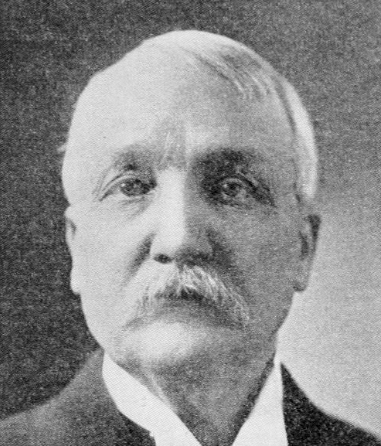
- Wells in 1927
- Born: Ebenezer Tracy Wells; May 15, 1835; Oswego County, US
- Died: April 20, 1923 (aged 87); Denver, Colorado, US
- Burial place: Fairmount Cemetery
- Occupation: Judge

Ebenezer Tracy Wells (May 15, 1835 – April 20, 1923) was an American judge. He served as an associate justice in both the territorial and state supreme courts.

== Early life ==
Wells was born on May 15, 1835, in Oswego County, New York. He graduated from Knox College in Galesburg, Illinois in 1855. He was admitted to the bar in 1856 and practiced law in Rock Island, Illinois until he joined the United States Army as a first lieutenant and served during the Civil War.

== Career ==
Wells moved to Colorado in October 1865 and settled first in Gilpin County. In the territorial government, he served as a member of the lower house of the 5th general assembly. In 1871, President Ulysses S. Grant appointed Wells associate justice of the territorial supreme court to fill out the term of Christian S. Eyster, who had resigned, and he served for four years until 1875. He was a member of the Colorado Constitutional Convention.

When Colorado gained statehood in 1876, Wells was one of four successful candidates elected to the Colorado Supreme Court. However, he resigned at the end of the court's first term after serving only one year on the bench. He practiced law with Edmond L. Smith and Thomas Mason in the firm Wells, Smith & Mason.

== Later life ==
From 1909 to 1920, Wells was the Reporter of the Supreme Court. Wells also ran for mayor of Denver in 1901 but lost the election. He died on April 20, 1923, aged 87, in Denver, and was buried at Fairmount Cemetery.

Political offices
Preceded by Position established	Justice of the Colorado Supreme Court; 1877–1877	Succeeded by Wilbur F. Stone
