= Gregory J. Hobbs Jr. =

American judge (1944–2021)

Associate Justice of the Colorado Supreme Court
- In office April 18, 1996 – August 31, 2015
- Appointed by: Roy Romer
- Succeeded by: Richard L. Gabriel

Personal details
- Born: December 15, 1944 Gainesville, Florida, U.S.
- Died: November 30, 2021 (aged 76)
- Education: University of Notre Dame (BA); UC Berkeley (JD)

Gregory James Hobbs Jr. (December 15, 1944 – November 30, 2021) was an American lawyer and judge who served as an associate justice of the Colorado Supreme Court from 1996 to 2015. A leading expert on Colorado water law, Hobbs practiced environmental, land use, transportation, and water law for more than two decades before his appointment to the bench. He conveyed his expertise not only on the state's highest court, but also through his extensive publications, presentations, and professional and community service.

== Biography ==
Gregory James Hobbs Jr., was born in Florida in 1944, the first of his Irish Catholic parents' five children. With an Air Force father, the family moved frequently, including to North Carolina, Pennsylvania, Panama, Virginia, Alaska, California, and Texas. Family, church, and school engaged and influenced young Greg as did his involvement in the Boy Scouts. He first joined while in Alaska and fully embraced the scouting life, the outdoors, and its lessons, becoming an Eagle Scout in 1959. In 1960, he attended the National Jamboree in Colorado Springs and soon spent his summers working at the Philmont Scout Ranch in New Mexico. He met Barbara Hay there in 1966, and the following year "Bobbie" and Greg married.

Hobbs earned his B.A. in history at the University of Notre Dame in 1966, with his sophomore year spent at St. Joseph's Seminary. After Notre Dame, he attended Columbia University to study Latin American history before deciding to join the Peace Corps. Following their 1967 wedding, the newlyweds went to Colombia for service. The couple returned in 1968 and had their first child, their son Daniel. Their daughter Emily followed in 1971.

Hobbs spent these early years of family life in law school at the UC Berkeley School of Law, completing his degree in 1971. He then clerked for Judge William Edward Doyle of the Tenth U.S. Circuit Court of Appeals in Denver for a year before briefly returning to California. In 1973, the Hobbs family returned to Denver for good. Hobbs worked for the newly formed U.S. Environmental Protection Agency for nearly two years and then the Natural Resources Section of the Colorado Attorney General's Office for almost four. At both organizations, he worked on environmental law, aimed at cleaning up polluted water and air, including Denver's "brown cloud." He concluded his time at the Attorney General's Office as special prosecutor and acting director of the Medicaid Fraud Unit.

Hobbs entered private practice as a partner at the law firm Davis, Graham and Stubbs in 1979. Soon, he became principal counsel to the Northern Colorado Water Conservancy District (NCWCD), a major water supplier for the region. In 1992, Hobbs and two other partners left Davis, Graham and Stubbs to establish their own firm of Hobbs, Trout and Raley, primarily to serve NCWCD.

== Service on the Colorado Supreme Court ==
In 1996, Hobbs's ambition of higher service was fulfilled with an appointment to the Colorado Supreme Court. There, he has brought his water expertise to important state-level cases. Including water decisions, he has authored more than 250 majority opinions for the court in civil and criminal cases. In 2008, Hobbs chaired the Water Court Committee, assessing the state's water court process and making recommendations to achieve efficiencies.

In March 2015, Hobbs announced his retirement from the Colorado Supreme Court. He stepped down from the bench on August 31, 2015.

=== Community service ===
Throughout his career, Hobbs was very active in the community and his profession. He served on numerous committees related to the environment, water, air quality, and transportation, along with extensive Boy Scout service. He also served as vice president for the Colorado Foundation for Water Education and a co-convener of the Water Judges' Educational Project, Dividing the Waters.

Hobbs also published widely and presented frequently, with expertise, eloquence, and humor. He authored numerous articles, essays, poems, and books, among the latter being: In Praise of Fair Colorado: The Practice of Poetry, History and Judging (2004); Colorado Mother of Rivers, Water Poems(2005); The Public's Water Resource: Articles on Water Law, History, and Culture (2007); Living the Four Corners: Colorado, Centennial State at the Headwaters (2010); and Into the Grand (2012). These and other writings and interviews found in this collection are the best biographical sources on Justice Hobbs.
