= Wilbur F. Stone =

American politician (1833–1920)

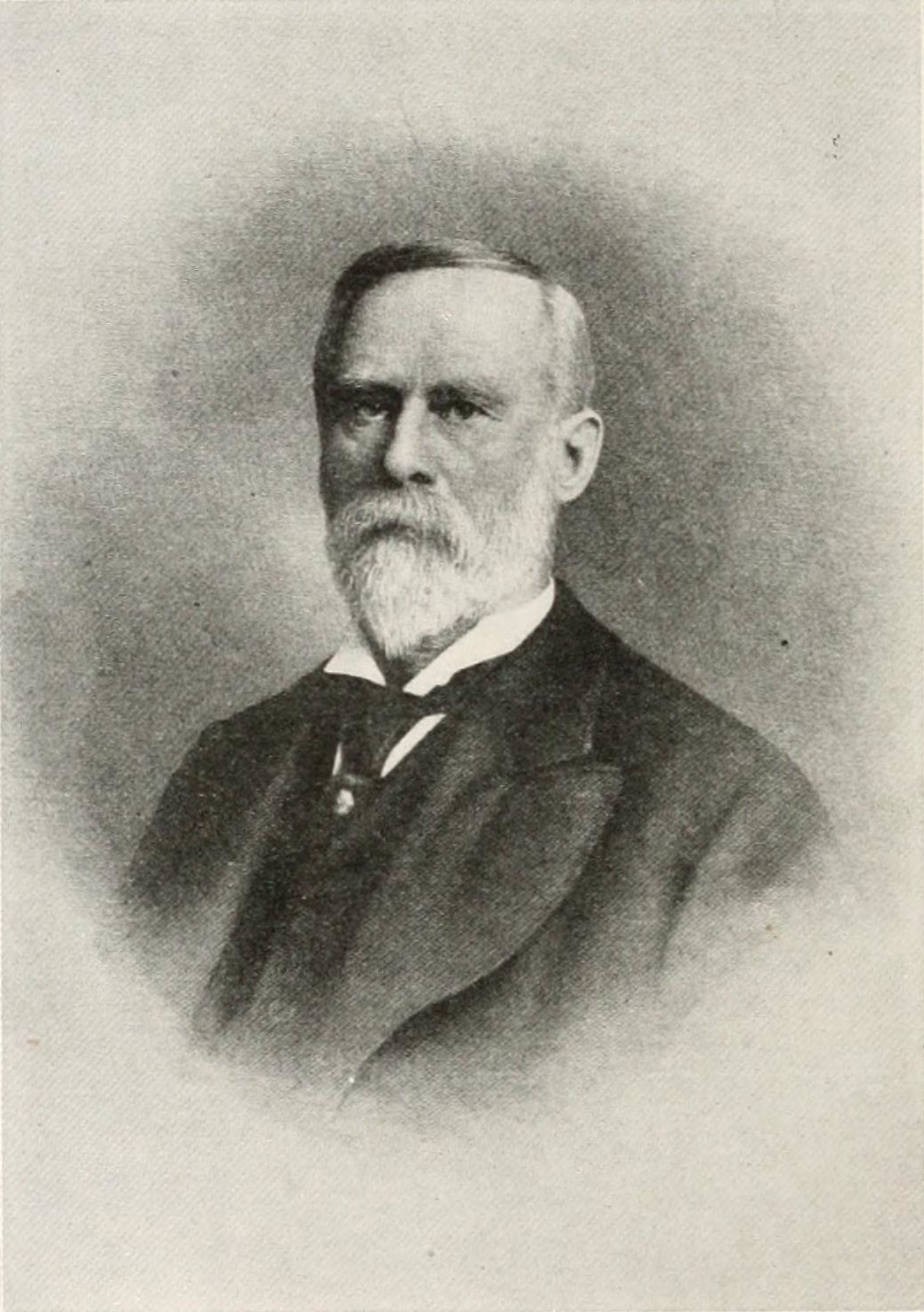

Justice of the Colorado Supreme Court
- In office 1877–1886

Member of the Colorado Territory Legislature
- In office 1862–1865
- Constituency: Park County

Personal details
- Born: December 28, 1833 Litchfield, Connecticut
- Died: December 27, 1920 (aged 86) Mount Vernon, Oregon
- Resting place: Fairmount Cemetery
- Spouse: Sallie Sadler
- Education: Asbury University; University of Indiana
- Occupation: Teacher, jurist, politician

Wilbur Fisk Stone Sr. (December 28, 1833 – December 27, 1920) was a teacher, lawyer, newspaper editor, miner, elected official, historian, and associate justice of the Colorado Supreme Court. He compiled the four volume History of Colorado.

== Early life ==
Stone was born in Litchfield, Connecticut, in 1833. After studying at Asbury University (now DePauw University) in Greencastle, Indiana, for three years, he transferred to the University of Indiana and after one year graduated and immediately began teaching classics there and studying law. He earned his law degree in 1858.

== Career ==
Over the next few years he practiced law and worked at newspapers in Evansville, Indiana, and Omaha, Nebraska. In 1860, he moved to Tarryall, Colorado, and worked as a miner, prospector, and lawyer. When Colorado Territory was organized, he served in the first territorial legislature as the representative from Park County. He was re-elected in 1864 and also served as the Assistant United States Attorney from 1862 to 1865.

Now married to Sallie Sadler, in 1866 he moved to Pueblo, Colorado, to practice law. In 1868, he was appointed to serve as the district attorney for Colorado's Third Judicial District and was later elected to the same position. Also in 1868, upon the founding of The Pueblo Chieftain newspaper, Stone became its first editor, a position he held until 1873.

In 1875-1876, Stone was a member of the Colorado Constitutional Convention, in which Colorado's constitution was drafted. Stone promoted and worked for the Denver & Rio Grande Railroad, serving as its attorney until he was appointed to serve as an associate justice of the Colorado Supreme Court in 1877 following the resignation of Ebenezer T. Wells. He served on the court until 1886. He practiced law and held several positions until President Benjamin Harrison appointed him to serve as one of five judges on the Court of Private Land Claims on June 10, 1891. He served until 1894, when the court's work was completed.

== Death ==
Stone died on December 27, 1920, in Mount Vernon, Oregon, aged 86. However, one source says he died in Denver. He is buried in Denver's Fairmount Cemetery.
