= Colorado Court of Appeals =

Intermediate appellate court of Colorado

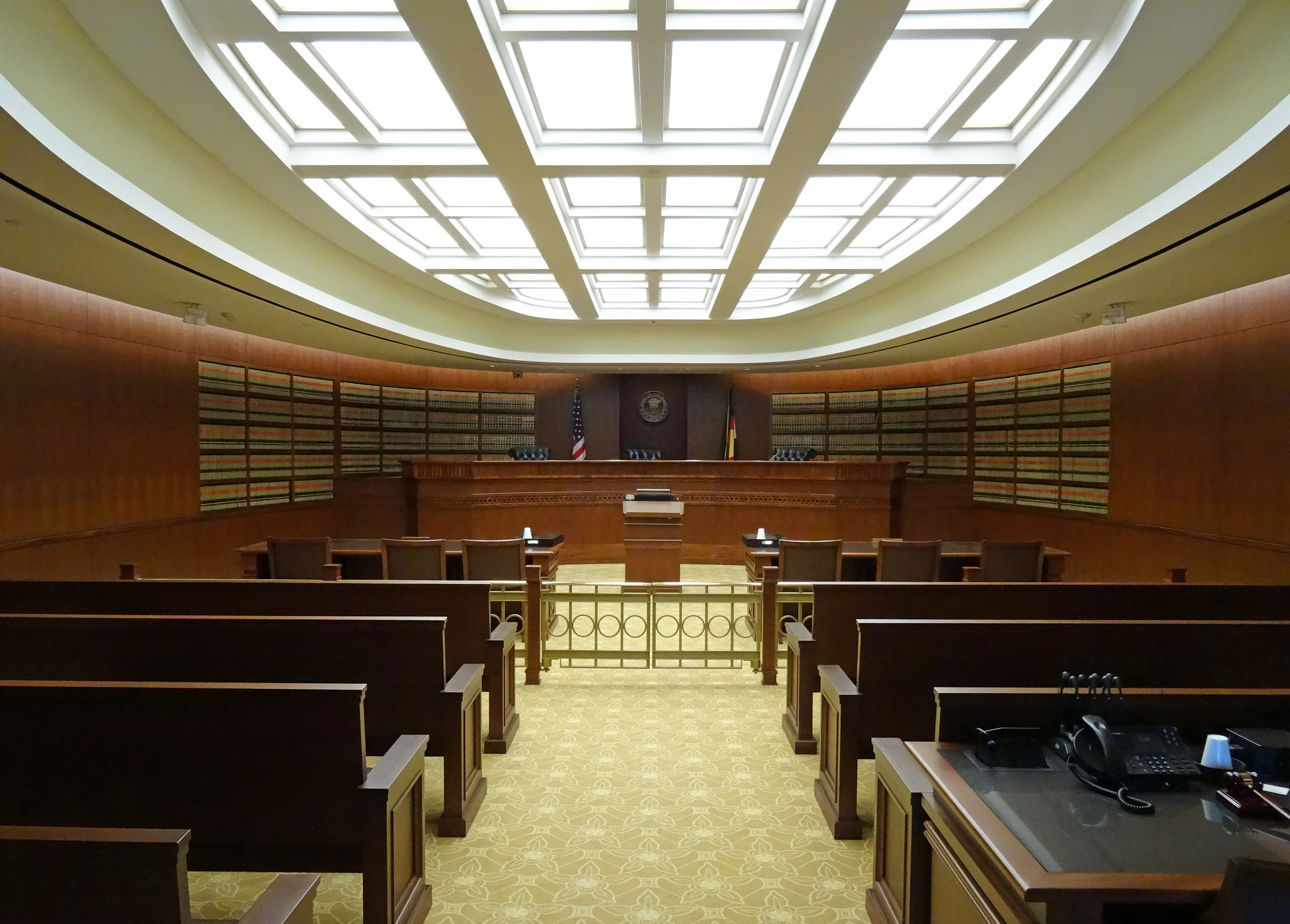
One of the Colorado Court of Appeals courtrooms in the Ralph L. Carr Colorado Judicial Center in Denver.

The Colorado Court of Appeals (Colo. App.) is the intermediate-level appellate court for the state of Colorado. It was initially established by statute in 1891 and was reestablished in its current form in 1970 by the Colorado General Assembly under Article VI, Section 1 of the Constitution of Colorado.

The Colorado Court of Appeals was first abolished in 1905, then reinstated in 1913, and abolished again in 1917. It has held its modern jurisdiction since 1970.

== Jurisdiction ==
The Court of Appeals has appellate jurisdiction primarily over final judgments of district courts acting as trial courts, and of approximately 33 kinds of administrative agency or board determinations. It is bypassed in the case of death penalty appeals, cases in which a lower court has declared a law or ordinance to be unconstitutional, appeals from Public Utilities Commission decisions, certain appeals related to the initiative process, interlocutory relief, and the further appeal of cases already appealed from a county or municipal court to a district court judge, all of which are appealed directly to the Colorado Supreme Court.

== Structure ==
There is a single geographical division of the Colorado Court of Appeals. The court sits in three-member divisions to decide cases. The chief judge, appointed by the Chief Justice of the Supreme Court, assigns judges to the divisions and rotates their assignments. The Colorado Court of Appeals does not have any internal subject-matter divisions, and it does not have "en banc" review of panel decisions as the federal United States courts of appeals do.

=== Location ===
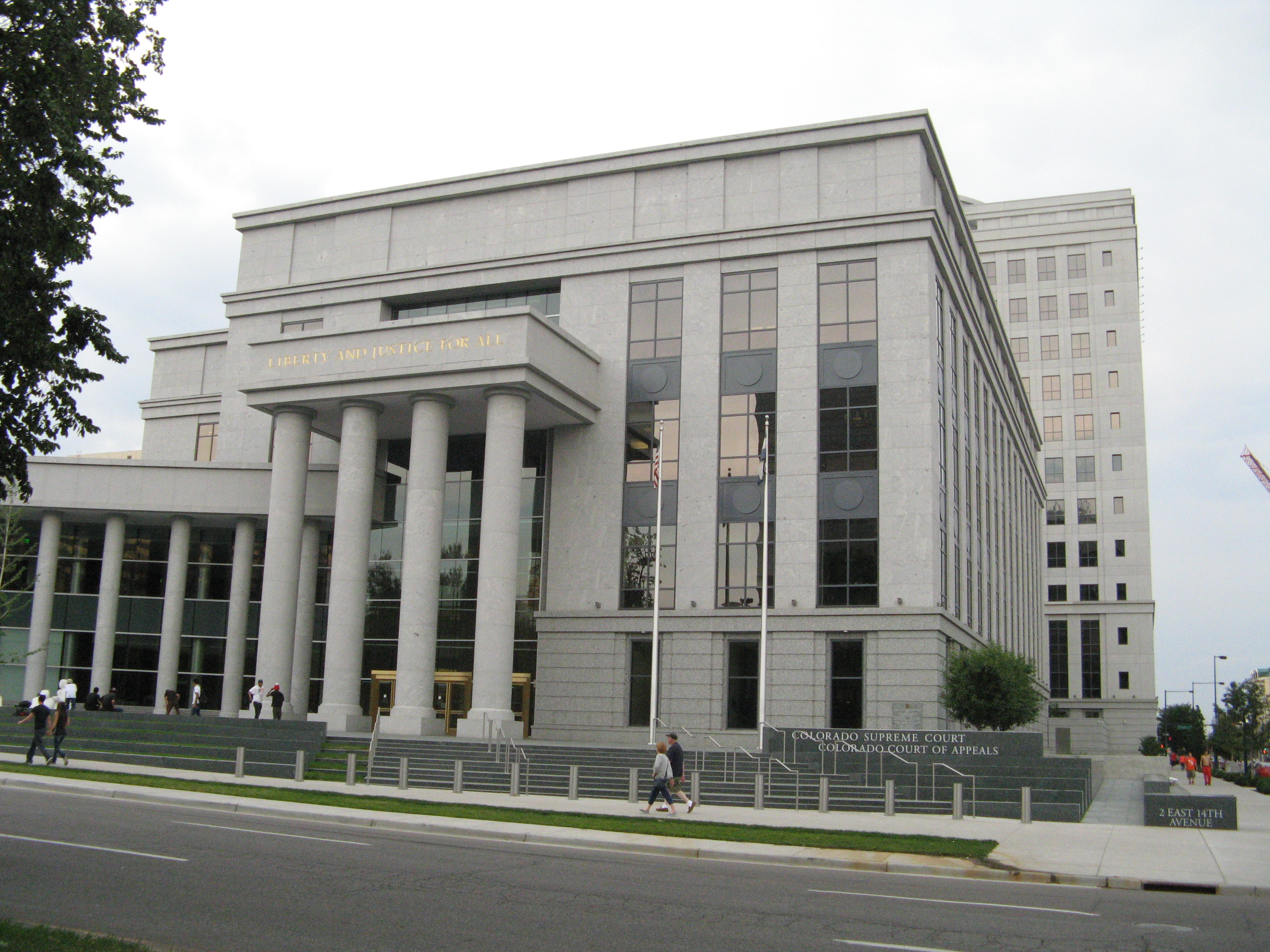
Colorado Court of Appeals in Denver

The court is based in Denver, but is authorized to sit in any county seat to hear cases. The court sends panels once a year to decide cases at the University of Colorado School of Law and the Sturm College of Law at the University of Denver to allow law students to observe the appellate process.

The court has two courtrooms in the Ralph L. Carr Colorado Judicial Center, located at 2 East 14th Avenue in Denver, Colorado.

== Administration ==
This court also has many others employees including support staff, secretaries, law clerks, reporters, and attorneys. There are 105 court employees, including the judges.

The Colorado Court of Appeals has heard more than 100 appellate cases each year since 2012. In the past two decades the state's Court of Appeals has experienced a dramatic increase in both caseload volume and delay. Because of this, case time is measured in terms of months and years.

== Judges ==
The Colorado Court of Appeals, located in Denver, has 22 judges. The judges serve eight-year terms and are subject to retention elections. Each judge has a separate chambers located in the Ralph L. Carr Judicial Center.

District (Note: Court of Appeals Judges are retained statewide, but each Judge is assigned to serve as a liaison between one of Colorado's judicial districts and the Court of Appeals.)	Name	Born	Start	Term Ends	Mandatory Retirement	Appointer	Law School
9th	Gilbert Román, Chief Judge	September 15, 1962 (age 63)	August 1, 2005	2032	2034	Bill Owens (R)	Michigan
7th	Jerry Jones	1961 (age 64–65)	July 5, 2006	2032	2033	Bill Owens (R)	Denver
5th	Maria Teresa Fox	1966 (age 59–60)	January 11, 2011	2030	2038	Bill Ritter (D)	South Texas
8th	Stephanie Dunn	–	November 23, 2012	2032	–	John Hickenlooper (D)	Denver
2nd	Elizabeth Harris	1966 (age 59–60)	July 23, 2015	2026	2038	John Hickenlooper (D)	NYU
4th	Rebecca Freyre	December 9, 1959 (age 66)	November 16, 2015	2026	2031	John Hickenlooper (D)	Denver
20th	Craig Welling	1970 (age 55–56)	January 16, 2017	2028	2042	John Hickenlooper (D)	Colorado
17th	Ted Tow	1967 (age 58–59)	February 13, 2018	2028	2039	John Hickenlooper (D)	Wayne
14th	Lino Lipinsky de Orlov	1958 (age 67–68)	January 9, 2019	2030	2030	John Hickenlooper (D)	NYU
3rd	Matthew Grove	1976 (age 49–50)	January 9, 2019	2030	2048	John Hickenlooper (D)	Colorado
19th	Neeti Pawar	1969 (age 56–57)	March 8, 2019	2030	2041	Jared Polis (D)	Southern Illinois
11th	Jaclyn Casey Brown	1981 (age 44–45)	May 31, 2019	2030	2053	Jared Polis (D)	St. Louis
1st	Sueanna Johnson	1975 (age 50–51)	February 13, 2020	2030	2047	Jared Polis (D)	Colorado
12th	Christina Gomez	1974 (age 51–52)	February 27, 2020	2030	2046	Jared Polis (D)	Harvard
18th	David Yun	1967 (age 58–59)	March 2, 2020	2030	2039	Jared Polis (D)	Colorado
6th	Eric Kuhn	1973 (age 52–53)	August 16, 2021	2032	2045	Jared Polis (D)	Denver
22nd	Timothy Schutz	1962 (age 63–64)	January 1, 2022	2032	2034	Jared Polis (D)	North Dakota
16th	Karl Schock	1981 (age 44–45)	November 7, 2022	2026	2053	Jared Polis (D)	Colorado
15th	Katharine Lum	November 30, 1983 (age 42)	November 16, 2022	2026	2055	Jared Polis (D)	Berkeley
13th	Pax Moultrie	1979 (age 46–47)	January 1, 2024	2026	2051	Jared Polis (D)	Denver
21st	Grant Sullivan	1984 (age 41–42)	January 1, 2024	2026	2056	Jared Polis (D)	Colorado
10th	Melissa Meirink	1979 (age 46–47)	January 14, 2025	2028	2051	Jared Polis (D)	Seattle
