= People v. Serravo =

Criminal case in Colorado

- Court: Supreme Court of Colorado
- Full case name: The People of the State of Colorado, Petitioner, v. Robert Pasqual Serravo, Respondent.
- Decided: January 13, 1992
- Citation: 823 P.2d 128

Case history
- Appealed from: Colorado Court of Appeals (797 P.2d 782, 1990)

Court membership
- Judges sitting: William H. Erickson, Luis D. Rovira, George E. Lohr, Joseph R. Quinn, Howard M. Kirshbaum, Anthony Vollack, Mary Mullarkey

Case opinions
- Majority: Quinn
- Dissent: Vollack

Keywords
- Insanity defense

People v. Serravo, 823 P. 2d 128 (Colo. 1992), is a criminal case heard by the Colorado Supreme Court involving the meaning of "wrong" in the expression "incapable of distinguishing right from wrong", as it appears in the M'Naghten rule for the insanity defense.

The question before the court was whether "incapable of distinguishing right from wrong" refers to distinguishing between moral right and moral wrong, vs. being able to distinguish what is legal from what is not legal.

The court concluded:

"that the term 'wrong' in the statutory definition of insanity refers to moral wrong."

The court also found that the standard of moral wrongness was an objective standard, not a subjective standard.

The court wrote "the phrase 'incapable of distinguishing right from wrong' refers to a person's cognitive ability, due to a mental disease or defect, to distinguish right from wrong as measured by a societal standard of morality... [and] does not refer to a purely personal and subjective standard of morality." The court also examined the relationship between the legal test of insanity and a deific decree, the belief that an act is not wrong because God ordered it.

Robert Pasqual Serravo was reading his Bible then went upstairs and stabbed his sleeping wife in the back. She did not die, and woke up. He told her an intruder stabbed her and he called for emergency assistance. When police arrived, he told them he left the garage door open, heard his front door slam, went upstairs to check on his wife, and found her bleeding. His wife later found letters written by Serravo admitting to the stabbing, confronted him, and he explained that God told him to sever their marriage by stabbing her, and called police who arrested and charged him. Serravo's attorney raised the insanity defense.

The prosecution forensic psychiatrist found Serravo sane because while he believed his act was justified and so was not morally wrong because of a delusional system, he was aware his act was contrary to law. One defense psychiatrist found that Serravo may have been able to tell what was or was not legally wrong, but his delusion made it impossible to tell moral right from wrong. Other defense psychiatrists found that his delusions made him unable to tell right from wrong, in accordance with standards of society. The question on appeal was whether "incapable of distinguishing right from wrong" refers to distinguishing between moral right and moral wrong, vs. being able to distinguish what is legal from what is not legal.
