= Hendershott v. People =

- Court: Supreme Court of Colorado
- Full case name: Lee Roy Hendershott, Petitioner, v. The People of the State of Colorado, Respondent.
- Decided: September 27, 1982
- Citation: 653 P.2d 385

Court membership
- Judges sitting: Edward E. Pringle, Paul V. Hodges, Robert B. Lee, William H. Erickson, Jean Dubofsky, Luis D. Rovira, George E. Lohr, Joseph R. Quinn

Case opinions
- Decision by: Quinn

Keywords
- Insanity defense

Hendershott v. People, Supreme Court of Colorado, 653 P.2d. 385 (1982), is a criminal case that a defendant who was not excused by being legally insane, might still be exculpated because he lacked a guilty mind (mens rea) due to a mental disease.

In Colorado, Lee Roy Hendershott accused a woman he was dating of being with another man, then struck, kicked, and choked her. He was charged with third degree assault in state court. In Colorado, third degree assault was a general intent crime (involving the act being knowingly or recklessly done), not a specific intent crime (in which the crime is intentionally done). Hendershott's defense attorney attempted to introduce evidence that Hendershott suffered from a mental disorder causing impulse control to counter that defendant had a guilty mind (mens rea). The evidence was excluded because of a statute that evidence of mental impairment short of legal insanity may be offered as bearing on capacity to form a specific intent. Defendant was convicted and appealed.

The state Supreme Court reversed and remanded. It reasoned that constitutional due process requires the prosecution to prove beyond a reasonable doubt that defendant has a guilty mind (mens rea), and to prove every fact needed to constitute the crime, citing Sandstrom v. Montana and Patterson v. New York. One element is mens rea. Disallowing evidence to rebut a prosecution showing that defendant had the requisite mens rea was an unconstitutional denial of due process. The court distinguished between legislation precluding an affirmative defense, and precluding a rebuttal to showing the element of mens rea.
