= Nathan B. Coats =

American judge

46th Chief Justice of the Colorado Supreme Court
- In office June 30, 2018 – January 1, 2020
- Preceded by: Nancy E. Rice
- Succeeded by: Brian Boatright

Justice of the Colorado Supreme Court
- In office April 24, 2000 – January 1, 2020
- Appointed by: Bill Owens
- Preceded by: Gregory K. Scott
- Succeeded by: Maria Berkenkotter

Deputy Attorney General of Colorado
- In office 1983–1986

Personal details
- Education: University of Colorado Boulder (BA, JD)

Nathan B. Coats is an American lawyer and jurist who served as the 46th chief justice of the Colorado Supreme Court from 2018 to 2020. Coats had been appointed to the court in 2000, by Governor Bill Owens and served until his retirement in 2020. His views while serving on the court were considered conservative.

== Early life ==
Nathan B. Coats received an undergraduate degree from the University of Colorado Boulder in 1971 and a juris doctor from the University of Colorado Law School in 1977. He was admitted to the Colorado Bar Association in 1977.

== Career ==
=== Military Service ===
Coats served in the United States Army for three years and was an officer. He was in military intelligence and was stationed in Germany.

=== Law ===
Coats worked at a private practice in Longmont, Colorado, from 1977 to 1978. He joined the Colorado Attorney General's in 1978 and served in the office's appellate unit until 1986. While in that role he worked for Mary Mullarkey, who later became Colorado's chief justice. From 1986 to 2000, he served as a chief appellate deputy district attorney in Denver, Colorado. During Coats's career, he appeared before the Colorado Courts of Appeals and Colorado Supreme Court over 150 times.

A man murdered a fourteen-year-old girl and confessed to her murder to police in 1983, after waiving his right to remain silent. However, his confession was ruled invalid after his defense attorneys argued that he was mentally ill. Coats argued for Colorado at the Colorado Supreme Court and won which allowed the confession to be admitted as evidence.

Coats also argued Colorado v. Connelly in the Supreme Court of the United States.

=== Colorado Supreme Court ===
Governor Bill Owens selected Coats on April 24, 2000, to replace Gregory K. Scott on the Colorado Supreme Court, becoming Owens' twentieth judicial nomination, after Scott's resignation. He was retained in the 2002 and 2012 elections.

He was considered "a fairly consistent conservative vote on the court" by Richard Collins, a professor from the University of Colorado Boulder. In 2006, the court ruled five to two to invalidate the Defend Colorado Now proposition as it was not a single-subject initiative, but Coats dissented stating that court took too much latitude with the single-subject requirement. The court ruled four to three in 2019, that a police search started as a result of a dog trained to detect marijuana was unconstitutional as marijuana was legal in Colorado, but Coats dissented in the decision.

Coats became the 46th chief justice of the supreme court on June 30, 2018, following the retirement of Chief Justice Nancy E. Rice who had served as chief justice since 2013. Coats retired once he reached the age of seventy-two which was the mandatory retirement age for judges and Justice Brian Boatright was selected to succeed him as chief justice. At the time of his retirement he was the last person appointed to the court by a Republican. He left the court on January 1, 2020, and Governor Jared Polis, in his first appointment to the supreme court, appointed Maria Berkenkotter to succeed him.

=== Censure ===
Former Chief Justice Coats agreed on May 3, 2023 to a public censure by the Colorado Commission on Judicial Discipline. The censure agreement followed an investigation of Coats' role in failing to supervise the behavior of the Office of State Courts Administrator. According to the entity that conducted the investigation, Coats "displayed a lack of attention to the dysfunctional and toxic operations of the State Court Administrator’s Office and made no effort to intervene." The events that led to Coats' censure included the improper award of a contract to a former chief of staff of the State Court Administrator's Office and sexual harassment by employees and judges of the Colorado state judiciary. The censure request is the first in Colorado history that would apply to a member of the state's highest court or to a chief justice of that court.

A special panel of the Colorado Supreme Court, composed of judges of the Colorado Court of Appeals, officially censured Coats on August 7, 2023.

== Electoral history ==
2002 Colorado judicial retention election
Party	Candidate	Votes	%
Nonpartisan	Yes	828,622	74.28%
Nonpartisan	No	286,961	25.72%
Total votes		1,115,583	100.00%

2012 Colorado judicial retention election
Party	Candidate	Votes	%
Nonpartisan	Yes	1,399,485	71.39%
Nonpartisan	No	560,766	28.61%
Total votes		1,960,251	100.00%

Legal offices
Preceded by Gregory K. Scott	Justice of the Colorado Supreme Court; 2000–2020	Succeeded by Maria Berkenkotter
Preceded by Nancy E. Rice	Chief Justice of the Colorado Supreme Court; 2018–2020	Succeeded by Brian Boatright
