= William D. Neighbors =

American judge (born 1939)

William D. Neighbors (born September 5, 1939) is an American attorney, judge, and arbitrator who served as an associate justice of the Colorado Supreme Court from 1983 to 1986.

== Early life, education, and career ==
Born in Longmont, Colorado, as a youth, Neighbors was active in the 4-H program, concentrating on beef cattle projects. During six years of club work he fed and exhibited 28 beef cattle, was a member of the Boulder County livestock judging team that placed second in the 1955 state competition, and earned numerous honors at the Boulder County Fair. In 1957 he was selected to represent Colorado at the National 4-H Club Congress in Chicago. Neighbors attended Colorado State University, where he initially majored in animal production before earning a bachelor's degree in farm and ranch management and a master's degree in economics. He received his Juris Doctor from the University of Colorado Law School in 1965, and gained admission to the bar in Colorado that same year.

Neighbors spent six years in private practice, until 1971, and then worked in the office of the Colorado State Public Defender from 1971 to 1973, when he received his first judicial appointment.

== Judicial service and later life ==
In June 1973, Governor John D. Vanderhoof appointed Neighbors to a seat as a district court judge for Colorado's Twentieth Judicial District, serving Boulder County. Neighbors became chief judge of the district in June 1981. On September 14, 1982, Governor Richard Lamm announced Neighbors's appointment to a seat on the Colorado Supreme Court vacated by the retirement of Justice Robert B. Lee, whose resignation became effective on January 11, 1983.

During his tenure on the court, Neighbors participated in decisions involving constitutional, civil, and criminal law. In 1984, he joined Justice Howard Kirshbaum in dissenting from a decision approving the ballot title for a proposed constitutional amendment to raise Colorado's drinking age to 21. The dissent argued that the Colorado Title Board exceeded its authority by interpreting the initiative in the ballot title rather than merely describing its contents. In 1985, Governor Richard Lamm joined public criticism of the court's criminal-law jurisprudence as too lenient, and regretted his appointees who had made such decisions; Neighbors defended the court, saying that disagreements by the public with judicial opinions were "just part of the job". Neighbors also dissented in a 1986 decision affirming a murder sentence imposed on a fifteen-year-old. Joining Justice Jean Dubofsky, he concluded that the sentencing judge had abused his discretion by failing to commit the teen to the Department of Institutions for treatment, rather than to the Department of Corrections.

In 1985 he was elected deputy chief justice by his colleagues, but in November 1985, Neighbors announced that he would resign from the Colorado Supreme Court effective February 1, 1986, explaining in his resignation letter that "the financial sacrifices necessitated by my last 15 years of public service have taken their toll" and that inadequate funding of Colorado's judicial system, including judicial salaries, had contributed to his decision. Following his resignation from the court, he became a private arbitrator. Neighbors has taught for the National Institute for Trial Advocacy at Harvard Law School, the University of Denver College of Law, the University of Colorado Law School. and in New Mexico law schools. With fellow former Colorado Supreme Court justice William H. Erickson, he has "written two books on constitutional criminal law and procedure".

Political offices
Preceded by Robert B. Lee	Justice of the Colorado Supreme Court; 1983–1987	Succeeded by Anthony Vollack
