= Gregory K. Scott =

American judge (1948–2021)

Gregory Kellam Scott (July 30, 1948 – March 31, 2021) was an associate justice of the Colorado Supreme Court from 1993 to 2000.

Scott received his J.D. from Indiana University. He moved to Denver, Colorado, in 1977 to take a position with the U.S. Securities and Exchange Commission. He was appointed by Governor Roy Romer to the Colorado Supreme Court in 1992, taking office on January 15, 1993. He resigned on March 15, 2000, to accept a position as vice president and general counsel of Kaiser-Hill LLC.

Scott died at his home in Anderson, Indiana, at the age of 72.

Political offices
Preceded by Joseph R. Quinn	Justice of the Colorado Supreme Court; 1993–2000	Succeeded by Nathan B. Coats
