= Brian Boatright =

American judge (born 1962)

Chief Justice of the Colorado Supreme Court
- In office January 1, 2021 – July 26, 2024
- Appointed by: John Hickenlooper
- Preceded by: Nathan B. Coats
- Succeeded by: Monica Márquez

Associate Justice of the Colorado Supreme Court
- Incumbent
- Assumed office November 21, 2011
- Appointed by: John Hickenlooper
- Preceded by: Alex J. Martinez

Personal details
- Born: June 16, 1962 (age 64) Golden, Colorado, U.S.
- Party: Republican
- Education: Westminster College (BA); University of Denver (JD)

Brian Boatright (born June 16, 1962) is an American lawyer and judge, who served as the chief justice of the Colorado Supreme Court from January 1, 2021 to July 26, 2024. He previously served as a judge on the Colorado District Court from 1999 to 2011.

== Education and early career ==
Boatright was born in Golden, Colorado, and graduated from Jefferson High School in Edgewater, Colorado, in 1980. He completed a Bachelor of Arts degree in 1984 at Westminster College in Fulton, Missouri, and received a Juris Doctor degree in 1988 from the Sturm College of Law of the University of Denver.

After a brief period in private practice, Boatright served from 1990 to 1999 as a deputy district attorney in Colorado's 1st judicial district. This district covers two counties, Gilpin and Jefferson, which are immediately west of Denver and part of the Denver metropolitan area.

== Judicial service ==
In 1999, the Republican Governor Bill Owens appointed Boatright as a state judge on the Jefferson County District Court. He was elected to new term on the court in a retention election in 2002 with 72% of the vote, and again in 2008 with 96% of the vote. Boatright oversaw more than 100 jury trials, and became known for his experience in juvenile court and family law.

In 2011, Justice Alex J. Martinez announced that he would resign, effective from October 31, 2011. The Colorado Judicial Nominating Commission selected Boatright as one of three possible candidates to replace Martinez. The other two candidates were attorney Frederick Martinez and University of Colorado lawyer Patrick O'Rourke. Democratic governor John Hickenlooper announced Boatright, a registered Republican, as his choice to replace Martinez on October 27, 2011.

Boatright was sworn in as a member of the Colorado Supreme Court on November 21, 2011. He was re-elected to a new ten-year term in a retention election in November 2014, where he received 68.5% of the vote. Boatright's current term on the court expires on January 14, 2025. When Nathan B. Coats retired on January 1, 2021, Boatright succeeded him as chief justice.

Legal offices
Preceded by Alex J. Martinez	Associate Justice of the Colorado Supreme Court; 2011–present	Incumbent
Preceded by Nathan B. Coats	Chief Justice of the Colorado Supreme Court; 2021–2024	Succeeded by Monica Márquez
