= Justice Quinn =

Justice Quinn may refer to:

- Aiden O'Brien Quinn (1932–2018), chief justice of the Seychelles, chief justice of the Gilbert Islands, and chief justice of Botswana
- James H. Quinn (1857–1930), associate justice of the Minnesota Supreme Court
- Joseph R. Quinn (1932–2023), associate justice and chief justice of the Colorado Supreme Court
- Peter A. Quinn (1904–1974), justice of the Supreme Court of New York, which is the trial level court of the state
