= Monica Márquez =

American judge (born 1969)

Chief Justice of the Colorado Supreme Court
- Incumbent
- Assumed office July 26, 2024
- Preceded by: Brian Boatright

Justice of the Colorado Supreme Court
- Incumbent
- Assumed office December 10, 2010
- Appointed by: Bill Ritter
- Preceded by: Mary Mullarkey

Personal details
- Born: Monica Marie Márquez; April 20, 1969 (age 57) Austin, Texas, U.S.
- Party: Independent
- Spouse: Sheila Barthel
- Education: Stanford University (BA); Yale University (JD)

Monica Marie Márquez (born April 20, 1969) is the chief justice of the Colorado Supreme Court. Previously a deputy Colorado attorney general, she was appointed by Governor Bill Ritter to the Supreme Court in 2010 to fill the vacancy created by the retirement of Chief Justice Mary Mullarkey. She was sworn in on December 10, 2010.

== Biography ==
A native of Austin, Texas, Márquez grew up in Grand Junction, Colorado and graduated as valedictorian from Grand Junction High School in 1987. She earned a bachelor's degree from Stanford University in 1991 before spending two years with the Jesuit Volunteer Corps, working with at-risk children in Camden, New Jersey, and Philadelphia. She then attended Yale Law School, earning a Juris Doctor in 1997 and serving as an editor of the Yale Law Journal. She went on to clerk for two federal judges: Michael Ponsor of the United States District Court for the District of Massachusetts and David M. Ebel of the United States Court of Appeals for the Tenth Circuit. She then worked as an associate at Holme Roberts & Owen before joining the Colorado Attorney General's office in 2002.

Márquez is a past president of the Colorado LGBT Bar Association and a board member of the Colorado Hispanic Bar Association. She also served as chairwoman of the Denver Mayor’s LGBT Commission. Her father, Jose D.L. Márquez, was the first Latino judge of the Colorado Court of Appeals.

On July 26, 2024 Márquez became the chief justice of the Colorado Supreme Court. She is the first Latina and first openly gay person in the state's history to serve in that position.

== Judicial appointment ==
On August 24, 2010, the Colorado Supreme Court Nominating Commission selected Márquez as one of three candidates to replace Justice Mary Mullarkey on the Colorado Supreme Court. On September 8, 2010, Democratic governor Bill Ritter announced Márquez as his choice to replace Mullarkey. The appointment won praise from her former boss, Republican Colorado Attorney General John Suthers. She became the chief justice on July 26, 2024.

Márquez is the first Latina and first openly gay person to serve on the Colorado Supreme Court. She is married. As of 2021, she is the longest-serving of eleven openly LGBT state supreme court justices serving in the United States.

== See also ==
- List of LGBT jurists in the United States
- List of LGBT state supreme court justices in the United States

Legal offices
Preceded by Mary Mullarkey	Justice of the Colorado Supreme Court; 2010–present	Incumbent
Preceded by Brian Boatright	Chief Justice of the Colorado Supreme Court; 2024–present	Incumbent
