= Maria Berkenkotter =

American judge (born 1962 or 1963)

Associate Justice of the Colorado Supreme Court
- Incumbent
- Assumed office January 1, 2021
- Appointed by: Jared Polis
- Preceded by: Nathan B. Coats

Personal details
- Born: Maria Encarnacion Berkenkotter; 1962 or 1963 (age 62–63)
- Education: Western Michigan University (BA); University of Denver (JD)

Maria Encarnacion Berkenkotter (born 1962 or 1963) is an American lawyer who has served as an associate justice of the Colorado Supreme Court since 2021.

== Education ==
Berkenkotter received a Bachelor of Arts from Western Michigan University in 1984 and a Juris Doctor from the University of Denver College of Law in 1987.

== Legal career ==
After graduating law school, she was an associate with Holmes & Starr from 1988 to 1990, she then served as an Assistant Attorney General with the Colorado Attorney General Regulatory Law and Consumer Protection Sections from 1990 to 2000, and then First Assistant Attorney General with the Colorado Attorney General Consumer Protection Section from 2000 to 2006. From 2018 to 2021 she was arbiter with the Judicial Arbiter Group, Inc.

== Judicial career ==
=== State court judicial service ===
Berkenkotter served as a district judge on Boulder County District Court from 2006 to 2017. She became Chief Judge on September 1, 2013 and retired on October 31, 2017.

In April 2016, Berkenkotter sentenced 36 year-old Dynel Lane to 100 years in prison for cutting a baby from a woman's womb.

=== Colorado Supreme Court ===
In May 2018, Berkenkotter was one of three candidates considered to fill the vacancy left by the retirement of Chief Justice Nancy E. Rice. In 2020, she was among three finalists for the Supreme Court. On November 20, 2020, Governor Jared Polis announced Berkenkotter his appointment to the Colorado Supreme Court to replace Justice Nathan B. Coats who retired on January 1, 2021.

Legal offices
| Preceded by Nathan B. Coats | Associate Justice of the Colorado Supreme Court; 2021–present | Incumbent |
