= Alex J. Martinez =

American judge

Associate Justice of the Colorado Supreme Court
- In office January 1997 – October 31, 2011
- Appointed by: Roy Romer
- Preceded by: Howard Kirshbaum
- Succeeded by: Brian Boatright

Judge of the Tenth Judicial District of Colorado (Pueblo County)
- In office 1988–1996
- Appointed by: Roy Romer

Judge of the Pueblo County Court
- In office 1983–1988
- Appointed by: Richard Lamm

Personal details
- Born: Alex Joseph Martinez; April 19, 1951 (age 75) Denver, Colorado, U.S.
- Spouse: Kathy
- Education: Phillips Exeter Academy; Reed College; University of Colorado (BA, JD)

Alex Joseph Martinez (born April 19, 1951) is an American attorney who served as an associate justice of the Supreme Court of Colorado from 1996 to 2011.

Born in Denver, Colorado, Martinez attended Phillips Exeter Academy in New Hampshire and Reed College in Portland, Oregon. He received a Bachelor of Arts from the University of Colorado in 1973, followed by a Juris Doctor from the University of Colorado Law School in 1976.

Martinez was a deputy state public defender in Denver from 1976 to 1979. when he relocated to Pueblo, Colorado to supervise state public defender's office there. In 1983, Governor Richard Lamm appointed Martinez to a county court judge seat in Pueblo County, and in 1988 Governor Roy Romer appointed Martinez as a district court judge in Colorado's Tenth Judicial District. In September 1996, Romer elevated Martinez to the Supreme Court of Colorado.

Martinez was retained on the court in 2000, and again in a strongly contested process in 2010. He resigned from the court in 2011 to accept a post as Manager of Safety for the city of Denver. Shortly after entering into this position, Martinez engendered some controversy by referring to a critical review of the police department as "nitpicky", although the comment endeared Martinez to the police. He left that position in 2013. From 2013 to 2016, he served as the General Counsel of the Denver Public School District.

Political offices
Preceded by Howard Kirshbaum	Justice of the Colorado Supreme Court; 1996–2011	Succeeded by Brian Boatright
