= Jefferson Junior/Senior High School =

Jefferson High School

Location
- 2305 Pierce Street; Edgewater, Colorado 80214; United States
- Coordinates: 39°45′03″N 105°04′20″W

Information
- Type: Public secondary school
- Motto: Home of the Saints
- Established: 1955 (71 years ago)
- School district: Jefferson County Public Schools
- CEEB code: 060416
- Dean: Marcia Hutchinson
- Principal: Ricardo Esparza
- Staff: 37.34 (FTE)
- Grades: 7-12
- Student to teacher ratio: 15.91
- Colors: Red, gray, white, black
- Mascot: Saint Jeff
- Website: jeffersonjrsr.jeffcopublicschools.org

Jefferson High School is a high school located in Edgewater, Colorado, United States. It is operated by Jefferson County Public Schools.

== Extracurricular activities ==
=== Athletics ===
Baseball Jefferson County league baseball champions in 1967, 1968, 1969. AAA State Champions 1968. 3rd place in state tournament 1969.

==== Basketball ====
In 1978, the Saints advanced to the final four in the Colorado State basketball tournament.

=== Academics ===
In 1980, the Saints Debate team advanced to the Colorado State Finals, after coming in second in the Jefferson County tournament.

== Notable alumni ==
- Brian Boatright (1980) - Associate Justice Colorado Supreme Court
- Alonzo Hampton (1985?) - former NFL defensive back
- Ron Kiefel (1978) - cyclist
- Ed Perlmutter (1971) - US Congressman 7th District Colorado

== Demographics ==
Enrollment in the 2010–2011 school year was 598 students. The student body's demographics were:

- 13.5% White
- 4.0% African American
- 78.6% Latino
- 1.5% Native American
- 0.7% Asian
- 1.7% Mixed race

Using federal government guidelines, 87.6% of the students were eligible for free or reduced-price lunches.
