= Vollack =

Vollack is a surname. Notable people with the surname include:

- Anthony Vollack (1929–2015), American judge
- Lia Vollack (born c.1965), American record executive
