= Michael L. Bender =

American judge

Chief Justice of the Colorado Supreme Court
- In office December 1, 2010 – January 7, 2014
- Succeeded by: Nancy E. Rice

Associate Justice of the Colorado Supreme Court
- In office January 2, 1997 – December 1, 2010
- Appointed by: Roy Romer
- Preceded by: George E. Lohr
- Succeeded by: William W. Hood III

Personal details
- Born: January 7, 1942 (age 84) The Bronx, New York
- Spouse: Helen H. Hand
- Education: Dartmouth College, University of Colorado Law School

Michael Lee Bender (born January 7, 1942) is an American attorney and jurist, who served as the 44th Chief Justice of the Colorado Supreme Court.

Bender earned a B.A. from Dartmouth College in 1964 and a law degree from the University of Colorado Law School in 1967. Prior to becoming a judge, he worked in private practice, for the Equal Employment Opportunity Commission, and as a public defender in Denver and Jefferson County and for the state. Bender also taught criminal law, criminal trial advocacy, and employment discrimination law at the University of Denver College of Law.

Bender was first appointed to the Colorado Supreme Court January 2, 1997 by Governor Roy Romer, to a seat vacated by the retirement of George E. Lohr. He won retention in 2010, despite opposition from conservative and Libertarian groups. He was voted Chief Justice by his fellow justices in 2010, taking the position on December 1, 2010. He retired from the court on January 7, 2014.

Bender is a registered Democrat. He has five children with his wife, Helen H. Hand, a psychologist who runs Colorado Free University; the couple live in the Stapleton development in Denver.
