= Defend Colorado Now =

Failed 2006 referendum

Defend Colorado Now (DCN) was a ballot initiative introduced in January 2006 to amend the constitution of Colorado to deny non-emergency public services that are not required by federal law to illegal immigrants in Colorado. It was similar to the recently approved Arizona Proposition 200 (2004), which denied public services to illegal aliens and California Proposition 187 (1994) which was declared unconstitutional by the Federal Appeals Court.

Had DCN supporters collected the required number of petition signatures, the proposed amendment would be placed on the ballot for voter approval in November 2006. In Colorado, approximately 68,000 valid petition signatures are required to place a proposed constitutional amendment on the ballot.

The current registered agent for the Defend Colorado Now initiative is former Colorado Governor Richard Lamm, and its director is Fred Elbel, head of Colorado Alliance for Immigration Reform, which has been deemed a hate group by the Southern Poverty Law Center.

== Ballot Title of the Defend Colorado Now Initiative ==
The language of the ballot initiative is as follows:

"[Shall there be] an amendment to the Colorado constitution concerning the restriction of non-emergency government services to certain persons who are lawfully present in the United States, and, in connection therewith, restricting the provision of non-emergency services by the State and local governments to United States citizens and aliens lawfully present in the United States, except as mandated by federal law; and providing for the implementation and enforcement of this restriction?"

U.S. Rep. Tom Tancredo first proposed the initiative in 2003 but was unable to get on the ballot due to a court challenge which limited the time needed to gather signatures.

In response to the initiative, Keep Colorado Safe was formed to oppose the amendment, arguing that: 1) the amendment would do nothing to stem the flow of undocumented immigration and 2) the proponents of the amendment have overstated the cost of providing such services.

== Current status ==
On June 12, 2006, the Colorado Supreme Court issued a ruling on the DCN initiative stating that the initiative was not a single subject. This made the initiative ineligible for the November 2006 ballot.

Petitions for rehearing were filed by Defend Colorado Now and by the Colorado Attorney General under the direction of Governor Bill Owens. On June 26, 2006, the Colorado Supreme Court denied the petitions for rehearing.

On June 29, 2006, Governor Owens called a special legislative session to convene on July 6, 2006. Owens requested an emergency legislative session in order to vote on referring the initiative to the voters or pass a legislative bill similar to the DCN initiative.

On July 11, 2006, the Colorado state legislature passed HB 1023, which limits state services to undocumented immigrants in Colorado. The bill embodies the essence of the DCN initiative.
