= Howard Kirshbaum =

American judge (born 1938)

Howard M. Kirshbaum (born September 19, 1938) was an associate justice of the Colorado Supreme Court from 1983 to 1997.

He received an undergraduate degree from Yale College, and law degree from Harvard Law School in 1965. While at Harvard Law School, he clerked for William Edward Doyle, who was then a judge of the United States District Court for the District of Colorado.

In 1975, he was appointed to the Denver District Court and in 1980 he was appointed to the Colorado Court of Appeals by Governor Richard Lamm. Lamm elevated Kirshbaum to the state supreme court in 1983. In 1984, he joined Justice William D. Neighbors in dissenting from a decision approving the ballot title for a proposed constitutional amendment to raise Colorado's drinking age to 21. The dissent argued that the Colorado Title Board exceeded its authority by interpreting the initiative in the ballot title rather than merely describing its contents. In 1985, Governor Richard Lamm joined public criticism of the court's criminal-law jurisprudence as too lenient, and regretted his appointees who had made such decisions, including Kirshbaum.

After leaving the court, Kirshbaum became an arbitrator with the Denver-based Judicial Arbiter Group Inc.

Political offices
Preceded by Edward E. Pringle	Justice of the Colorado Supreme Court; 1983–1997	Succeeded by Alex J. Martinez
