= Nancy E. Rice =

American judge (born 1950)

Nancy Rice

Chief Justice of the Colorado Supreme Court
- In office January 8, 2014 – June 30, 2018
- Preceded by: Michael L. Bender
- Succeeded by: Nathan B. Coats

Associate Justice of the Colorado Supreme Court
- In office August 5, 1998 – June 30, 2018
- Appointed by: Roy Romer
- Preceded by: Anthony Vollack
- Succeeded by: Carlos Samour

Personal details
- Born: June 2, 1950 (age 76) Boulder, Colorado, U.S.
- Party: Democratic
- Education: Tufts University (BA); University of Utah (JD)

Nancy E. Rice (born June 2, 1950) is the former Chief Justice of the Colorado Supreme Court.

== Life and education ==
Rice was born on June 2, 1950, in Boulder, Colorado, and grew up in Colorado and Cheyenne, Wyoming. She received her Bachelor of Arts cum laude from Tufts University in 1972 and her J.D. from the University of Utah College of Law in 1975. She has one daughter.

== Career ==
After graduating from law school, Rice served as a law clerk for Judge Fred Winner of the United States District Court for the District of Colorado from 1975 to 1976. She then worked as an appellate state public defender from 1976 to 1977 before joining the U.S. Attorney's Office for the District of Colorado, where she served as the Deputy Chief of the Civil Division from 1985 to 1987. Rice became a judge on the Denver District Court in 1987, the same year she began teaching as an adjunct professor at the University of Colorado School of Law.

== Service on Colorado Supreme Court ==
Rice was originally appointed to the Colorado Supreme Court on August 5, 1998, by Governor Roy Romer and was subsequently elevated to Chief Justice on January 8, 2014. She retired from active service on June 30, 2018.

== See also ==
- List of female state supreme court justices

Legal offices
Preceded by Anthony Vollack	Associate Justice of the Colorado Supreme Court; 1998–2018	Succeeded by Carlos Samour
Preceded by Michael L. Bender	Chief Justice of the Colorado Supreme Court; 2014–2018	Succeeded by Nathan B. Coats
