= State v. Leidholm =

1983 North Dakota case on reasonableness in exercising self-defense

- Court: North Dakota Supreme Court
- Full case name: State of North Dakota, Plaintiff and Appellee, v. Janice Leidholm, Defendant and Appellant.
- Decided: May 12, 1983
- Citation: 334 N.W.2d 811

Court membership
- Judges sitting: Ralph J. Erickstad, Vernon R. Pederson, William Paulson, Gerald W. VandeWalle, Paul M. Sand

Case opinions
- Decision by: VandeWalle
- Concurrence: Erickstad, Pederson, Paulson, Sand

Keywords
- Justification and excuse; Murder; Self-defense; Standard of reasonableness

State v. Leidholm, Supreme Court of North Dakota, 334 N.W.2d 811 (1983), is a criminal law case distinguishing the subjective and objective standard of reasonableness in a case where a battered woman used self-protection as a defense. Janice Leidholm had killed her husband near Washburn, North Dakota and claimed self defense. The case clarifies between the defenses of justification and excuse. The case overturned Janice Leidholm’s prior conviction regarding her husband’s death.
