= William W. Hood III =

American judge (born 1963)

William Hood
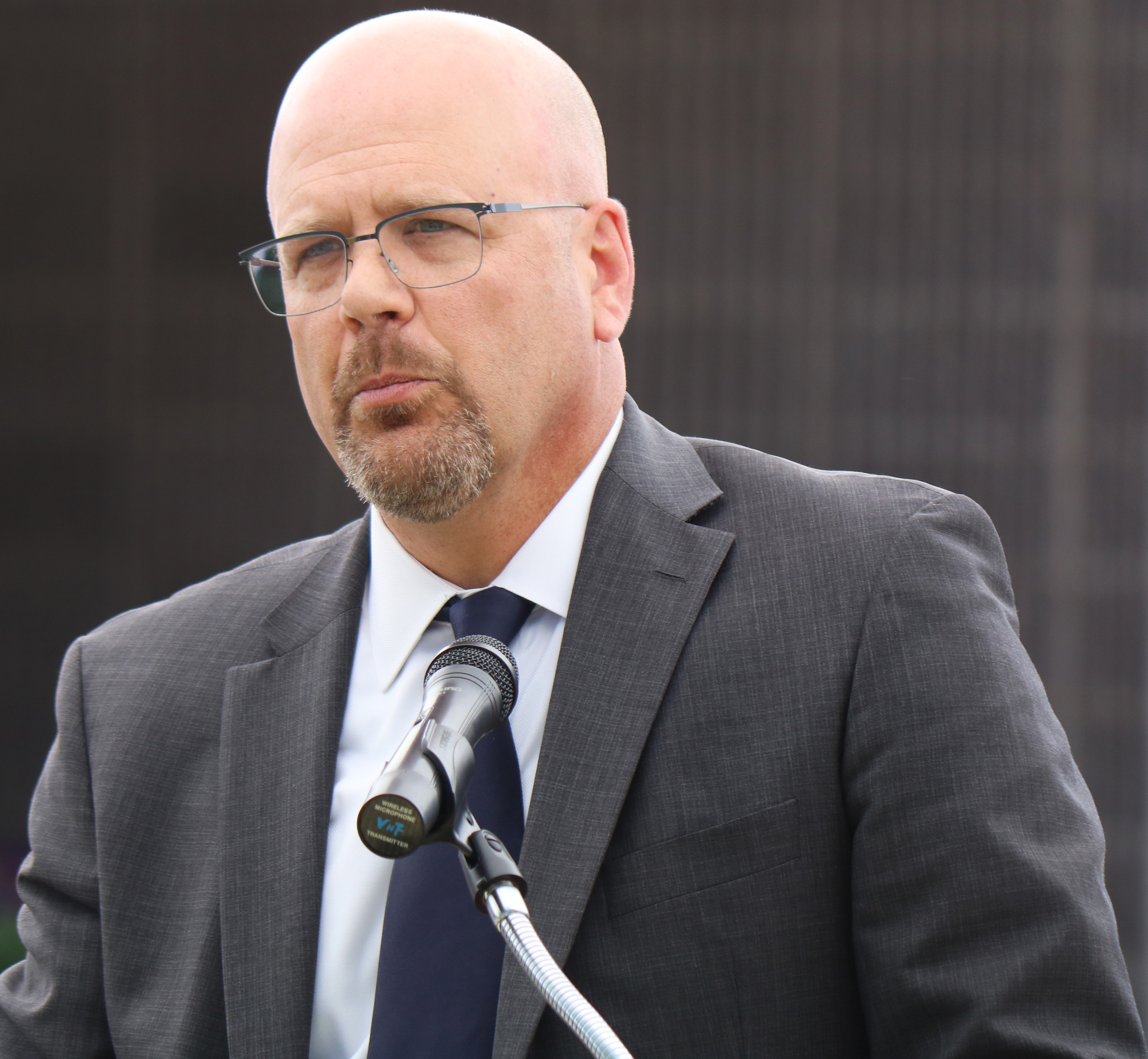

Associate Justice of the Colorado Supreme Court
- Incumbent
- Assumed office January 7, 2014
- Appointed by: John Hickenlooper
- Preceded by: Michael L. Bender

Personal details
- Born: 1963 (age 62–63)
- Education: Syracuse University (BA); University of Virginia (JD)

William W. Hood III (born 1963) is an associate justice of the Supreme Court of Colorado, having served in this position since 2014.

Hood received a Bachelor of Arts in International Relations, magna cum laude, from Syracuse University in 1985, and a Juris Doctor from the University of Virginia School of Law, where he was a member of the Virginia Law Review. Hood was in private practice with the law firm of Isaacson Rosenbaum, and was later a prosecutor with the 18th Judicial District Attorney's office for ten years, before becoming Denver County District Court Judge in 2007.

On October 25, 2013, Colorado Governor John Hickenlooper appointed Hood to the supreme court. Hood was reelected to a ten-year term in 2016.

Legal offices
Preceded by Michael L. Bender	Associate Justice of the Colorado Supreme Court; 2014–present	Incumbent
