= Carlos Samour =

American judge (born 1966 or 1967)

Associate Justice of the Colorado Supreme Court
- Incumbent
- Assumed office July 2, 2018
- Appointed by: John Hickenlooper
- Preceded by: Nancy E. Rice

Personal details
- Born: Carlos Armando Samour Jr. 1966 or 1967 (age 59–60) El Salvador
- Education: University of Colorado Denver (BA); University of Denver (JD)

Carlos Armando Samour Jr. (born 1966 or 1967) is an associate justice of the Colorado Supreme Court and former chief judge of the Eighteenth Judicial District Court in Colorado. He is known for serving as the judge for the trial of James Eagan Holmes, the convicted perpetrator of the 2012 Aurora, Colorado shooting.

== Early life ==
Samour was born in El Salvador, and came to the United States in 1979 when he was 13 years old. His family fled El Salvador due to the civil war that was occurring. He graduated from Columbine High School in 1983. Samour received his Bachelor of Arts in psychology from the University of Colorado Denver. He was awarded his Juris Doctor from the University of Denver.

== Career ==
Samour served as a deputy district attorney in Denver, Colorado, for ten years. He also previously practiced law with the firm of Holland & Hart. He began his legal career serving for one year as a law clerk for former Judge Robert Hugh McWilliams Jr. of the United States Court of Appeals for the Tenth Circuit. He was appointed to the court in 2006 and took office in 2007. Samour was retained to the Eighteenth Judicial District Court for a six-year term, winning 62.18 percent of the vote.

=== Service on the Colorado Supreme Court ===
On May 31, 2018 Governor John Hickenlooper appointed Samour as an associate justice on the Colorado Supreme Court.

Legal offices
| Preceded by Nancy E. Rice | Justice of the Colorado Supreme Court; 2018–present | Incumbent |
