= Objective standard (law) =

The subjective standard and objective standard are legal standards for knowledge or beliefs of a defendant in a criminal law case. An objective standard of reasonableness requires the finder of fact to view the circumstances from the standpoint of a hypothetical reasonable person, absent the unique particular physical and psychological characteristics of the defendant. A subjective standard of reasonableness asks whether the circumstances would produce an honest and reasonable belief in a person having the particular mental and physical characteristics of the defendant, such as their personal knowledge and personal history, when the same circumstances might not produce the same in a general reasonable person.

A case differentiating the standards is State v. Leidholm (1983).

People v. Goetz (1986), hinged on the distinction.

In People v. Serravo (1992), the court found that the standard of knowledge of moral wrongness in the M'Naghten rule is the objective standard. The court wrote, "Moral wrong can be measured either by a purely personal and subjective standard of morality or by a societal and presumably more objective standard. We believe that the better reasoned interpretation of 'wrong' in the term 'incapable of distinguishing right from wrong' refers to a wrongful act measured by societal standards of morality."
