= Sloan Lake (Colorado) =

Lake in Denver County, Colorado

Sloan's Lake
- View facing east towards downtown Denver

- Location within Colorado Location within the United States
- Location: Denver, Colorado, US
- Coordinates: 39°44′56″N 105°02′51″W
- Basin countries: United States
- Surface area: 177 acres (72 ha)
- Surface elevation: 5,308 ft (1,618 m)
- Settlements: Denver

Sloan Lake, also known as Sloan's Lake and Sloans Lake, is a body of water, park, and neighborhood in Denver, Colorado. The neighborhood is located on the northwest side of Denver, with the lake acting as a central feature of the neighborhood.

== Sloan Lake ==
Sloan Lake is located on the western edge of Denver's city limits, adjacent to the suburbs of Lakewood, Edgewater and Wheat Ridge. The approximate boundaries are Sheridan Boulevard to the west, 17th Avenue to the south, Raleigh St. to the east, and 26th Avenue to the north. There are no tributary streams to the lake.

=== History ===
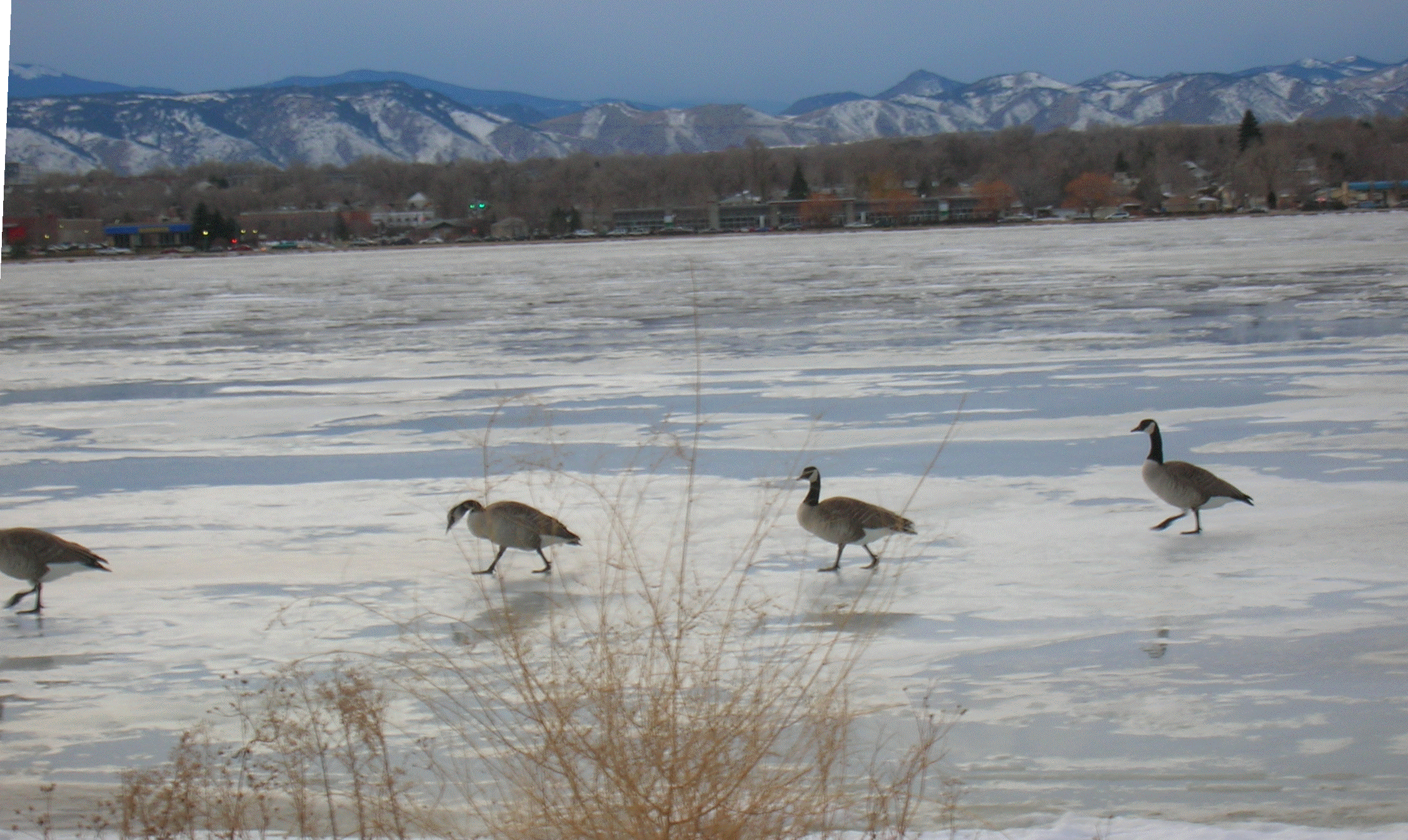
A flock of Canada geese on the frozen surface of Sloan's Lake in winter. The foothills of the Rocky Mountains are in the background.

The true history of the creation of Sloan Lake may never be officially known, but during the settlement of the Denver area in the mid to late 19th century, the lake did not exist. Since spring 1859, South Golden Road connecting Denver and the western suburb of Golden crossed through where Sloan Lake is now.

In December 1866, under the newly enacted Southern Homestead Act, Thomas M. Sloan received a patent for the land from US President Andrew Johnson to use the land for agricultural purposes, farming, and cattle-raising. A commonly accepted and incorrect legend states that Sloan dug a well on the land, inadvertently tapping into an underground aquifer, and that when he awoke the next morning, part of his farmland was covered in water. That flooded this part of South Golden Road, and the realigned thoroughfare, now known as Colfax Avenue, would become the major east-west thoroughfare in this part of the city. But, according to gold rush era stagecoach driver Bill Turner, the lake appeared sometime between when he left for Kansas in June 1861 and when he returned in early 1863. It is possible that Sloan occupied the land prior to patenting it. However, it is unlikely that Sloan would have applied for a patent to farmland that was under water, and just as unlikely that the patent would have been granted under the Southern Homestead Act.

The lake once exceeded 200 acres (0.81 km^{2}) and extended north and west beyond its current size, but portions were filled north of 25th Avenue and west of Sheridan Boulevard. The area surrounding the lake was once home to an amusement park and swimming facility known as Manhattan Beach. Opened to the public 27 June 1881, it was the first amusement park to be built west of the Mississippi River (it burned down in 1908 and was rebuilt as Luna Park later that year); mishaps, and competition from other such attractions in the vicinity (Elitch Gardens and Lakeside Amusement Park), led to its closure in 1914. Cooper Lake, a separate body of water just southeast of Sloan's Lake, fell under the jurisdiction of the federal Works Projects Administration in the 1930s, and a plan was developed which involved building channels beneath the surface of the water on both lakes. This essentially created one body of water that has commonly become known as Sloan's Lake. The size of the present-day combined Sloan's Lake and Cooper Lake is 177 acres (0.72 km^{2}), and is managed by the Parks and Recreation division of the City and County of Denver.

=== Wildlife and Habitat ===
Sloan's Lake is a seasonal and year-round home to a variety of birds, fish and other wildlife. Birds include white pelicans, mallard ducks, Canada geese, seagulls, barn swallows, house finches, and common night hawks. Cormorants and herons find refuge from shore-based predators in colonies on Cooper Island and feed on black crappie, carp and trout stocked by Colorado Parks and Wildlife agency. The lake’s muddy flats and shallower waters provide habitat for wading birds such as avocets and semi-aquatic rodents including native muskrats and non-native nutria. Predators include fox and coyote, which are occasionally seen around the lake. Cottonwood trees, cattails and bluegrass grow along the shoreline, and the lake waters support duckweed, algae and other native and invasive aquatic plants.

=== Penny Island ===
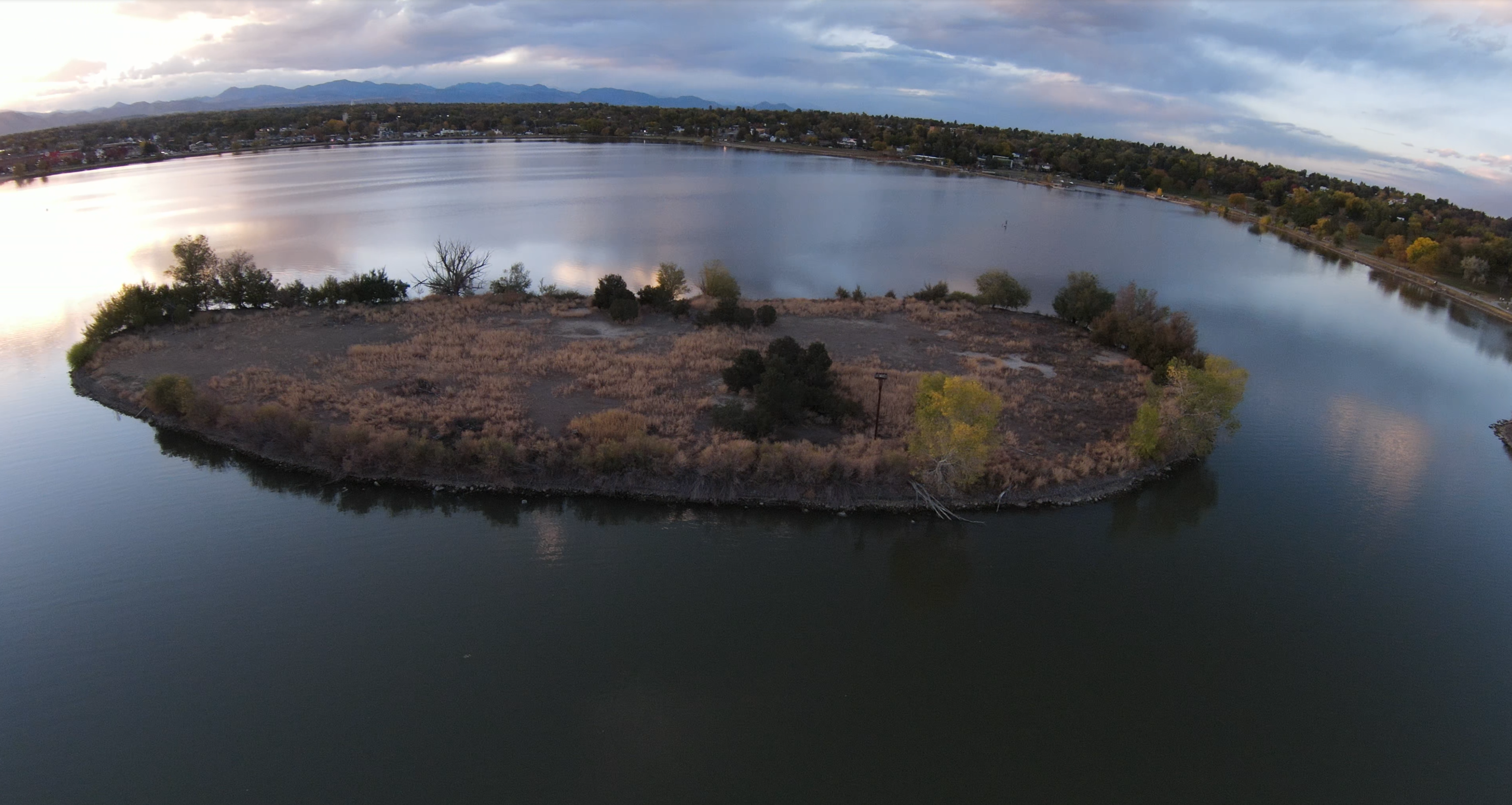
Evening westward view of 67,396-square-foot Penny Island, home to a gamut of waterfowl offspring. The manmade osprey nesting structure is visible near the center of the image.

Found in the center of the lake, Penny Island is a mostly barren 67,396 square foot island. It houses a manmade osprey nesting structure constructed in 2014. From spring to early summer, the area attracts photographers and bird enthusiasts who come to observe these birds firsthand. The island is also a common attraction for local amateur drone pilots.

== Sloan's Lake Park ==
Sloan's Lake facing west, with the foothills of the Rocky Mountains in the background.

At 290 acres (1.2 km^{2}), Sloan's Lake Park is the second largest park in Denver (after City Park). Typical activities at the park include hiking, jogging and bicycling on the trails and sidewalks that surround the lake, and fishing and boating on the lake itself. There are basketball and tennis courts located in the park. An annual event known as the Dragon Boat Festival attracts thousands of visitors each summer, celebrating Asian American culture and civilization.

== Sloan Lake neighborhood ==
The neighborhood of Sloan Lake has undergone rapid gentrification in recent years, with a corresponding appreciation in real estate values: the average price for a single-family home in 2017 was $543,400, compared to the 2009 average of $259,000. According to the 2000 census, the average household income was $48,300; as of 2017, it is $66,618. The average price per square foot for a home in June 2017 was $311.16. The housing stock in Sloan's Lake is diverse with a wide range of housing and styles including 1920s brick bungalows to new, post-modern architecture. More than 66 percent of Sloan's Lake residents own their home, an above average figure for Denver.

A construction boom has also characterized the Sloan Lake neighborhood in recent years, with a flurry of both single-family homes and apartment units being built. The closure and demolition of St. Anthony's Hospital, which encompassed a seven-block radius to the south of the park, gave way to residential redevelopment that included a 12-story condominium tower, a 369-unit apartment building, and a bevy of restaurants and shops.

== See also ==
- Bibliography of Colorado
- Geography of Colorado
- History of Colorado
- Index of Colorado-related articles
- List of Colorado-related lists
  - List of neighborhoods in Denver
  - List of populated places in Colorado
- Outline of Colorado
