= Alonzo Hampton (defensive back) =

American football player (born 1967)

No. 25, 22
- Position: Defensive back

Personal information
- Born: January 19, 1967 (age 59); Butler, Alabama, U.S.
- Listed height: 5 ft 10 in (1.78 m)
- Listed weight: 191 lb (87 kg)

Career information
- High school: Edgewater (CO) Jefferson
- College: Pittsburgh
- NFL draft: 1990: 4th round, 104th overall pick

Career history
- Minnesota Vikings (1990); Tampa Bay Buccaneers (1991); Cleveland Browns (1992)*; Detroit Lions (1993)*
- * Offseason or practice squad member only

Career NFL statistics
- Interceptions: 1
- Stats at Pro Football Reference

Alonzo Hampton (born January 19, 1967) is an American former professional football player who was a defensive back in the National Football League (NFL). He played for the Minnesota Vikings in 1990 and the Tampa Bay Buccaneers in 1991. He played college football for the Pittsburgh Panthers and was selected by the Vikings in the fourth round of the 1990 NFL draft with the 104th overall pick.
