= People v. Goetz =

American criminal case

- Court: New York Court of Appeals
- Full case name: The People of the State of New York v. Bernhard Goetz
- Decided: July 8 1986
- Citation: 68 N.Y.2d 96, 497 N.E.2d 41, 73 A.L.R.4th 971, 55 USLW 2107

Case history
- Prior history: Defendant indicted (Jan. 25, 1985, Mar. 27, 1985); Supreme Court, Trial Term, New York County, dismissed indictment, 131 Misc. 2d 1, 502 N.Y.2d 577 (Jan. 21, 1986); Supreme Court, Appellate Division, affirmed, 116 A.D.2d 316, 501 N.Y.S.2d 326 (Apr. 17, 1986)
- Subsequent actions: Defendant criminally convicted of criminal possession of a weapon in the third degree, upheld on appeal by New York Court of Appeals, 73 N.Y.2d 751 (Nov 22, 1988), and acquitted of attempted murder and assault charges. In a civil action filed by Cabey, Goetz is found responsible for Cabey's injuries and ordered to pay $43 million.

Holding
- 1) The defense of justification which permits the use of deadly physical force is not a purely subjective standard; the actor's beliefs permitting deadly force must be subjectively held and objectively reasonable. 2) Hearsay statements casting doubt on some of the evidence presented to a grand jury do not warrant dismissal of an indictment.

Court membership
- Chief judge: Sol Wachtler
- Associate judges: Bernard S. Meyer, Richard D. Simons, Judith S. Kaye, Fritz W. Alexander II, Vito J. Titone, Stewart F. Hancock, Jr.

Case opinions
- Majority: Wachtler, joined by Unanimous

Laws applied
- New York Penal Law Art. 35

People v. Goetz, 68 N.Y.2d 96 (N.Y. 1986), was a court case chiefly concerning subjective and objective standards of reasonableness in using deadly force for self-defense; the New York Court of Appeals (the highest court in the state) held that a hybrid objective-subjective standard was mandated by New York law.The underlying case, involving the shooting of four black teenagers on a New York subway, was "one of the most controversial cases in recent American history". The shooting sparked a media frenzy, and Defendant Bernhard Goetz was both vilified and exalted in the press and in public opinion.

== Background ==
=== Factual background ===
The incident concerned a mass shooting that occurred in New York City on December 22, 1984. Four young black men (Troy Canty, Darryl Cabey, James Ramseur, and Barry Allen) boarded a New York City Subway car in the Bronx. The shooter, Bernhard Goetz, fled the scene and on December 31 surrendered himself to the police in New Hampshire. Goetz initially told police that, after firing four shots, he walked over to an injured Cabey and said, "You don't look so bad, here's another," before shooting him again; he later retracted this statement.

Manhattan District Attorney Robert Morgenthau asked a grand jury to indict Goetz on four counts of attempted murder, four of assault, four of reckless endangerment, and one of criminal possession of a weapon. On January 25, the grand jury refused to indict Goetz on the more serious charges, voting indictments only for unlawful gun possession—one count of criminal possession of a weapon in the third degree, for carrying in public the loaded unlicensed gun used in the subway shooting, and two counts of possession in the fourth degree, for keeping two other unlicensed handguns in his home. Morgenthau subsequently sought and was granted permission from the court to resubmit the case to another grand jury with additional evidence. The second grand jury indicted Goetz on charges of attempted murder, assault, reckless endangerment and weapons possession.

In January 1986, Judge Crane granted a motion by Goetz to dismiss the indictments stemming from the second grand jury. Judge Crane dismissed the charges on two grounds: First, he held that the prosecutor had erred when instructing the grand jury that, for Goetz's actions to be protected by New York's self-defense statute, they would have to be objectively reasonable. Second, he found that Canty and Ramseur "strongly appeared" to have perjured themselves. Although Judge Crane did not specify his bases for the latter finding, the New York Times reported that it appeared to be based on alleged statements by Canty, Ramseur, and Cabey: According to police officer Peter Smith, who responded to the shooting, Canty told him that the group was planning to rob Goetz, but Goetz shot them first, though Police Commissioner Benjamin Ward said through a spokesman that he did not find Smith's account credible. Ramseur gave an interview to the Cable News Network saying he believed Goetz thought he was going to be robbed. And Cabey, while in the hospital, allegedly told New York Daily News reporter Jimmy Breslin that the other members of the group planned to rob Goetz because he "looked like easy bait" (though Cabey denied involvement himself).

The prosecution appealed the case. On April 17, 1986, the Appellate Division affirmed the decision of the lower court, prompting the appeal to the New York Court of Appeals.

=== Legal background: Self defense ===
In 1961, the New York legislature updated its penal code. The update was spurred in part by the American Law Institute's release of the Model Penal Code—a document meant to inspire changes to state penal codes. As to defendants accused of intentional or attempted murder, the Model Penal Code suggested that an actor should only need to show that he "believe[d] that [the use of deadly force] was necessary" to avoid death or serious bodily injury—a wholly subjective test. New York's updated self-defense statute borrowed significantly from the Model Penal Code, but the word "reasonably" was inserted before "believe". That is, a jury was required to find that the actor "reasonably believe[d]" his or her use of force was necessary to protect the actor from death, serious injury, or specified crimes.

Previously, New York courts had interpreted their penal code as requiring a defendant asserting self defense to show that his or her actions were objectively reasonable. But, in response to the 1961 update, a split emerged among New York's lower courts: some of those courts began interpreting the justification statute as being consistent with the Model Penal Code—requiring only a subjective belief. Judge Crane adopted that logic in his decision, and an appellate division affirmed his dismissal.

== Opinion of the Court ==
Judge Sol Wachtler wrote for a unanimous court overturning Judge Crane's dismissal. The Court held that the requirement of "reasonabl[e] belie[f]" in the statutory text entailed an objective element, continuing to align New York with the majority of states.

Section 35.15 (2) sets forth ... limitations ... with respect to the use of "deadly physical force": "A person may not use deadly physical force upon another person under circumstances specified in subdivision one unless (a) He reasonably believes that such other person is using or about to use deadly physical force ... or (b) He reasonably believes that such other person is committing or attempting to commit a kidnapping, forcible rape, forcible sodomy or robbery" ....

....

The plurality below agreed with defendant's argument that the change in the statutory language from "reasonable ground," used prior to 1965, to "he reasonably believes" in Penal Law § 35.15 evinced a legislative intent to conform to the subjective standard .... This argument, however, ignores the plain significance of the insertion of "reasonably". ...

We cannot lightly impute to the Legislature an intent to fundamentally alter the principles of justification to allow the perpetrator of a serious crime to go free simply because that person believed his actions were reasonable and necessary to prevent some perceived harm. To completely exonerate such an individual, no matter how aberrational or bizarre his thought patterns, would allow citizens to set their own standards for the permissible use of force. It would also allow a legally competent defendant suffering from delusions to kill or perform acts of violence with impunity, contrary to fundamental principles of justice and criminal law.

....

Accordingly, [a] jury must first determine whether the defendant ... believed deadly force was necessary to avert the imminent use of deadly force or the commission of one of the felonies enumerated therein. ... [T]hen the jury must also consider whether these beliefs were reasonable. The jury would have to determine, in light of all the "circumstances" ... if a reasonable person could have had these beliefs.

— People v. Goetz, New York Court of Appeals

With respect to the lower court's alternate theory for dismissal, the perjury issue, the Court found that the ground could be "rejected more summarily." The Court first noted that the evidence indicating that perjury may have been committed was not dispositive, finding, "[A]ll that has come to light is hearsay evidence that conflicts with part of Canty's testimony." As such, the Court held that dismissal was not warranted, as, "[t]here is no statute or controlling case law requiring dismissal of an indictment merely because, months later, the prosecutor becomes aware of some information which may lead to the defendant's acquittal."

Having reversed the lower court on both grounds, the Court reinstated all counts of the indictment.

== Aftermath ==
Goetz was acquitted of the attempted-murder and first-degree-assault charges and convicted of criminal possession of a weapon in the third degree–for carrying a loaded, unlicensed weapon in a public place. (Note: The jury found that Goetz lacked the specific intent to commit attempted murder, never technically reaching the question of justification; however, because intent was not seriously challenged at trial, subsequent analyses postulated that the jury had effectively incorporated self-defense into the intent analysis. Garvey, Stephen P. (Winter 2008). "Self-Defense and the Mistaken Racist". New Criminal Law Review. 11 (1). 121 n.18. Fletcher, George P. (June 1990). A Crime of Self-Defense: Bernhard Goetz and the Law on Trial. University of Chicago Press. ISBN 0-226-25334-1.) Goetz was originally sentenced to six months in jail, one year's psychiatric treatment, five years' probation, 200 hours community service, and a $5,000 fine. However, in November 1988, an appellate court overturned this sentence, finding that the state's gun laws required, at minimum, a one-year sentence. Goetz requested that the appellate court overturn the conviction entirely, arguing that the judge's jury instructions improperly discouraged jury nullification, but the appellate division and New York Court of Appeals disagreed. On remand, Judge Crane sentenced Goetz to one-year incarceration and a $5,000 fine. Goetz ultimately served eight months.

One of the victims of the shooting, Darrell Cabey, who remained paralyzed, sued Goetz, represented by Ron Kuby, who had previously defended Long Island Rail Road mass murderer Colin Ferguson. The jury found in favor of Cabey and awarded him the sum of $18,000,000 in compensatory damages and $25,000,000 in punitive damages.

Goetz declared bankruptcy in 1996, freeing himself from an estimated $16m in legal debts, but not from the $43m judgment.
