= Anthony Vollack =

American judge

Chief Justice of the Colorado Supreme Court
- In office 1995–1998
- Preceded by: Luis Rovira
- Succeeded by: Mary Mullarkey

Associate Justice of the Colorado Supreme Court
- In office 1986–2000
- Appointed by: Governor Richard Lamm
- Preceded by: William D. Neighbors
- Succeeded by: Nancy E. Rice

Senator from the 13th and 16th districts, Colorado State Senate
- In office 1964–1972
- Appointed by: Direct election

Personal details
- Born: August 7, 1929 Cheyenne, Wyoming, U.S.
- Died: September 28, 2015 (aged 86) Denver, Colorado, U.S.
- Spouse: Imojean Shelton
- Children: 2
- Education: Colorado State University (B.S.); Sturm College of Law (LL.B.)

Anthony Francis Vollack (August 7, 1929 – September 28, 2015) was a justice of the Colorado Supreme Court from 1986 to 2000, serving as chief justice from 1995 to 1998. He also served as a State Senator for two terms in Colorado.

== Biography ==
Vollack was born in Cheyenne, Wyoming, and his family moved to Fort Collins, Colorado when he was in high school. He studied at the Colorado Agricultural & Mining College (now Colorado State University), receiving a B.S. degree in 1951. Following service as an officer in the United States Air Force, he attended the University of Denver Sturm College of Law, graduating with a LL.B. in 1956.

Following law school, from 1956 to 1977, Vollack was in solo practice in Denver. In 1964, he successfully ran as a Democrat for State Senator from the 13th District, composed of Jefferson County. In 1968 he was re-elected for a second term representing the 16th District, including both Jefferson and Adams Counties. He was noted for his interest in issues of child welfare and good government.

In 1972, Vollack decided to challenge three-term Republican incumbent Gordon L. Allott for a seat in the U.S. Senate. He was defeated by Floyd K. Haskell in the Democratic primary. Haskell would go on to win the Senate race.

In 1977, Vollack's name was put forward for the District Court bench by the Colorado Merit Selection system, and he was appointed by Governor Richard Lamm. In 1986, Vollack was elevated to serve as justice of the Colorado Supreme Court. He sat as chief justice from 1995 to 1998, during which he helped form the Colorado Judicial Coordinating Council, composed of state and federal judges, and used the power of the "Chief Justice Directive" to modernize court operations. In 2000, he retired from the bench. He then served as an alternative dispute resolution mediator with the Judicial Arbiter Group.

He received numerous awards for his community service, including in 1999 the Champion for Children Award by the Rocky Mountain Children's Law Center.

== Personal life ==
On August 2, 1958, he married Imojean Shelton, a school teacher in Denver who had grown up in Memphis, Tennessee. They were introduced by Senator Estes Kefauver, whose secretary, Jowanda Shelton, was her sister. The couple had two children: Kirk Vollack, a musician and teacher, and Lia A. Vollack (Lurie).

== See also ==
- List of justices of the Colorado Supreme Court

Legal offices
Preceded by William D. Neighbors	Associate Justice of the Colorado Supreme Court; 1986–2015	Succeeded by Nancy E. Rice
Preceded by Luis Rovira	Chief Justice of the Colorado Supreme Court; 1995–1998	Succeeded by Mary Mullarkey
