= Alan J. Pfeuffer =

American lawyer

Alan Pfeuffer is an American lawyer who volunteered to serve Guantanamo captives. He had spent twenty years as a police officer, rising to police chief, before beginning a career in law.

Pfeuffer was Chief of the Edgewater, Colorado, Police Department. He focused on advanced narcotics investigation techniques. Pfeuffer retired from the Police Department in 1997.

Pfeuffer works in the Columbus, Ohio, office of the Federal Public Defender.

== Guantanamo clients ==
Pfeuffer's Afghan clients are Ahsanallah Pirzai and Abdul Ahmad. In October 2005 a US District Court judge in Washington, D.C. received hand handwritten notes from Pirzai and Ahmad, asserting their innocence. He then assigned the two men to Pfeuffer. But, as of May 30, 2007, Pfeuffer had not been able to visit the men, phone them, or write to them.

Pfeuffer told The Columbus Dispatch:

I don't know if they even know I exist,

Pfeuffer filed a complaint on behalf of the two men on January 4, 2006.

The Department of Justice argued that the Detainee Treatment Act prohibited captives initiating new habeas corpus appeals.

According to The Columbus Dispatch, Pfeuffer then decided to research the information that was available to the public, including cases that dated back to the 18th century, and the thousands of pages of transcripts the DoD released on March 3, 2006. Pfeuffer travelled to Afghanistan on August 1, 2006, to interview witnesses who knew the two men.

Two men from Ahmad's village were able to confirm that he was a schoolteacher, just as he had testified, who had never had any ties to the Taliban.

On August 26, 2006 Pfeuffer received an email from a Department of Justice lawyer, telling him that Pirzai had been released. In February 2007 Pfeuffer was told that Ahmad had also been released. Pfeuffer told the Columbus Dispatch that he didn't know whether the men were released, whether they had been transferred to Afghan custody, or whether they were still in Guantanamo.
