= Betty Crocker Homemakers of Tomorrow =

Prize for American high schoolers awarded from 1955-1977

The Betty Crocker Homemakers of Tomorrow, officially known as the Betty Crocker Search for the All-American Homemaker of Tomorrow, was a scholarship awarded to young women in the United States from the 1954-1955 school year to 1977. In 1973, the test opened up to men, and the 1974 award was the first to be renamed the All-American Family Leader for Tomorrow. The program, which was sponsored by General Mills and named for its Betty Crocker brand, awarded around $2.1 million in scholarships total.

== History ==
The Betty Crocker Search for the All-American Homemaker of Tomorrow was established by General Mills in the early 1950s. The high school-aged contestants took a 50-minute, 150-question exam. A retrospective General Mills article says that the topics covered in the exam included "family relationships, spiritual and moral values, child development and care, health and safety, utilization and conservation, money management, recreation and use of leisure time, home care and beautification, community participation, and continuing education." The test was designed by the Science Research Associates of Chicago. In 1956, the test was administered to 256,534 students at 10,222 schools. In 1971, a reported 650,000 women participated.

The winners from each high school received a pin and an award, and then wrote essays. The program used the essays to choose one winner from each state to participate in a week-long national competition in Washington D.C., where a single woman was crowned the national Betty Crocker Homemaker of Tomorrow.

One question was "Which of the following is a fundamental principle of good furniture arrangement?" and the answer choices were "Keep centers of visual interest away from the furniture", "Keep large pieces of furniture away from the walls", "Use accessories of a size contrasting with furniture", and the correct answer, which was "Do not mix very small and very large pieces of furniture". Susan Marks, who published a book in 2005 called Finding Betty Crocker, wrote a blog post about the award, and comments on the post revealed that many of the winners simply good test-takers, not necessarily good homemakers. "Some confess they only took the exam to get out of class. Some say they were a little embarrassed by the whole thing," reads a General Mills history blog. "One winner wrote that when her name was announced over the school intercom all the jocks started ribbing her about making them a sandwich."

State-level winners won $1500 for first place and $500 for second place. The national winner received $5000. State winners also received sets of the Encyclopædia Britannica for their schools. The national winner was announced in a nationwide broadcast.

General Mills maintained a publication called Searchlight with information and updates about Betty Crocker Homemakers of Tomorrow winners, such as Massachusetts Senator Elizabeth Warren, who won the award in 1966 for Northwest Classen High School in Oklahoma City.

== National winners ==
Year	Name	Home	Citation
1955	Deloris Arnette	Enterprise, Alabama	
1956	Sandra M. Walton	Oklahoma	
1957	Priscilla Jones	Georgia	
1958	Mary Martin	Mississippi	
1959	Judith Dorrell	Iowa	
1960	Jean D. Eberhart	Kansas	
1961	Mary Sue Roach	South Carolina	
1962	Nan Claire Fitzpatrick	Massachusetts	
1963	Rae Jean Dell	Nebraska	
1964	Suzanne Moutoux	Indiana	
1965	Martha Yunker	South Dakota	
1966	Candace Slater	New York	
1967	Karen Pesaresi	Kansas	
1968	Irene Lindley	Hawaii	
1969	Martha Illige	Arizona	
1970	Lori Fisher	California	
1971	Susan Tibbetts	Rock Hill, South Carolina	
1972	Christine Varney	Massachusetts	
1973	Mary Lydia Ruiz	Louisiana	
1974	Susan Lynn Van Wechel	Oregon	
1975	Mary Lawlor	Ohio	
1976	Daniel McVicar	Colorado	
1977	Deborah Jacobs	Massachusetts	
