= Lueras v. Lafayette =

1937 Colorado Supreme Court civil rights case

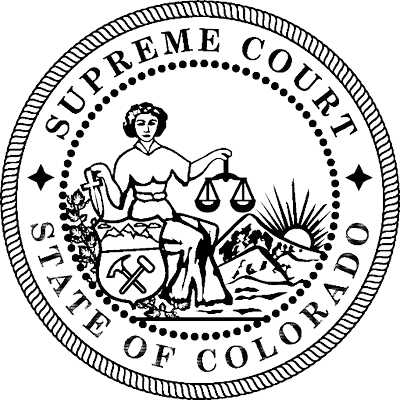
- Seal of the Colorado Supreme Court
- Court: Colorado Supreme Court
- Full case name: Rose Lueras et al. v. Town of Lafayette et al.
- Decided: March 8, 1937
- Docket nos.: 13828
- Verdict: Affirmed — The court held that there was insufficient evidence of a conspiracy involving the town; the fire department was not a governmental agency under town control, and the plaintiffs’ claims were deemed indefinite and uncertain.
- Charge: Civil conspiracy and denial of civil rights (alleged discriminatory exclusion from a public facility).
- Citation: 65 P. 2d 1431
- Claim: Plaintiffs sought a declaratory judgment alleging that the Town of Lafayette and its fire department conspired to deny them equal access to a public swimming pool on the basis of race/ethnicity.

Case history
- Prior actions: Appeal from District Court, Boulder County

Court membership
- Judges sitting: Claude C. Coffin, Benjamin Hilliard

Case opinions
- Concurrence: Haslett Platt Burke, Mr. Justice Bakke

Area of law
- Civil rights; constitutional law; municipal law

Lueras v. Lafayette, 65 P.2d 1431 (100 Colo. 124), was a case decided by the Colorado Supreme Court that affirmed the denial of declaratory relief in a case alleging racial discrimination, finding no sufficient showing of a municipal conspiracy or governmental control.

== Background ==
In the early 1930s, the Town of Lafayette, Colorado, supported the construction of a swimming pool intended for use by town residents. Lafayette at the time had a substantial population of residents of Spanish descent. Many of these residents worked in coal mining and related industries and paid municipal taxes.

After the pool was completed, the town leased the facility to the local volunteer fire department. Although the pool had been constructed with public support, access to it was restricted. Latino residents reported that they were refused entry, and contemporary accounts described practices that limited use of the pool to white residents.

Members of the affected community raised concerns about their exclusion, arguing that the pool functioned as a public facility and should be open to all residents on equal terms. When their objections did not result in a change in access, Rose Lueras and other residents initiated legal action against the town and related parties. They alleged that the way in which the pool was operated resulted in unlawful discrimination.

== Parties involved ==
=== Rose Lueras ===
Rose Lueras (née Lovato; September 29, 1902 – June 15, 1935) was a resident of Lafayette, Colorado who served as the named plaintiff in a lawsuit against the Town of Lafayette and its fire department after she and other members of the local Latino community were denied access to the town's public swimming pool on racial grounds.

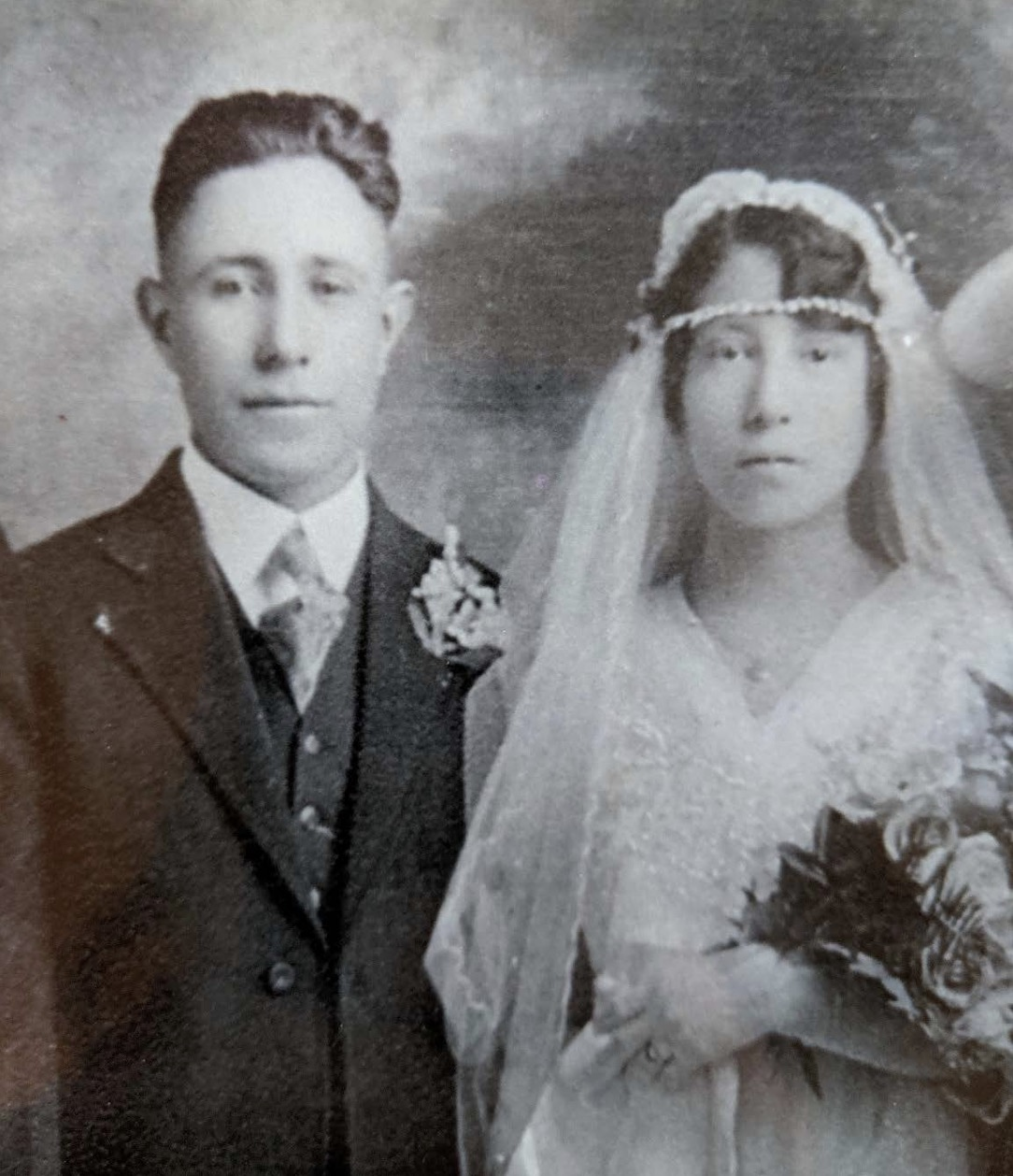
Wedding portrait of Rose Lueras and her husband, taken in Colorado in the early 1920s.

=== Town of Lafayette ===
The Town of Lafayette, Colorado, was named as a defendant in its municipal capacity, along with certain town officials. At the time of the lawsuit, the town had supported the construction of a public swimming pool intended for community use. The plaintiffs alleged that the town participated in, or permitted, discriminatory practices that resulted in the exclusion of Latino residents from the facility.

According to the plaintiffs’ claims, the town council approved an arrangement under which the swimming pool was leased to the local volunteer fire department, which subsequently operated the facility. The plaintiffs contended that this arrangement enabled racially discriminatory exclusion while allowing the town to disclaim direct responsibility for the pool’s operation.

In its defense, the Town of Lafayette denied engaging in any conspiracy to discriminate and argued that the volunteer fire department was not a municipal agency subject to town control. The town maintained that it did not direct or authorize discriminatory practices at the pool.

== Legal claims ==
The plaintiffs in Lueras v. Town of Lafayette filed their action under Colorado’s Declaratory Judgments Act. They claimed that defendants had unlawfully denied them access to a public facility on the basis of race or ethnicity. The plaintiffs, who identified themselves as residents of Spanish descent, alleged that the Town of Lafayette, its mayor, trustees, certain town officials, and members of the local volunteer fire department had conspired to deny them the right to use the town’s public swimming pool. They claimed this went against the protections of the Fourteenth Amendment to the United States Constitution and the corresponding provisions of the Colorado Constitution’s Bill of Rights. They also claimed violations of Colorado civil rights statutes then in force (Colorado Laws 1921, chapter 72), which prohibited discrimination in public accommodations and facilities. The petition sought a judgment that the denial of pool access was in violation of these constitutional and statutory provisions.

The plaintiffs’ complaint was that, after the pool’s construction with public support, it was leased to the volunteer fire department and run in a way that excluded Latino residents. A sign reading “White trade only” had been displayed at the pool entrance, and some plaintiffs testified that they were told they could not swim because of their race.

At both the trial and appellate levels, the defendants denied that the town or its officials had engaged in a conspiracy to discriminate. They contended that the voluntary fire department’s operation of the pool was not under the direct control of the town and that the evidence did not support the claims made in the petition. The Colorado Supreme Court ultimately affirmed the lower court’s ruling, concluding that the plaintiffs’ showing was “indefinite and uncertain” and did not warrant the declaratory relief sought.

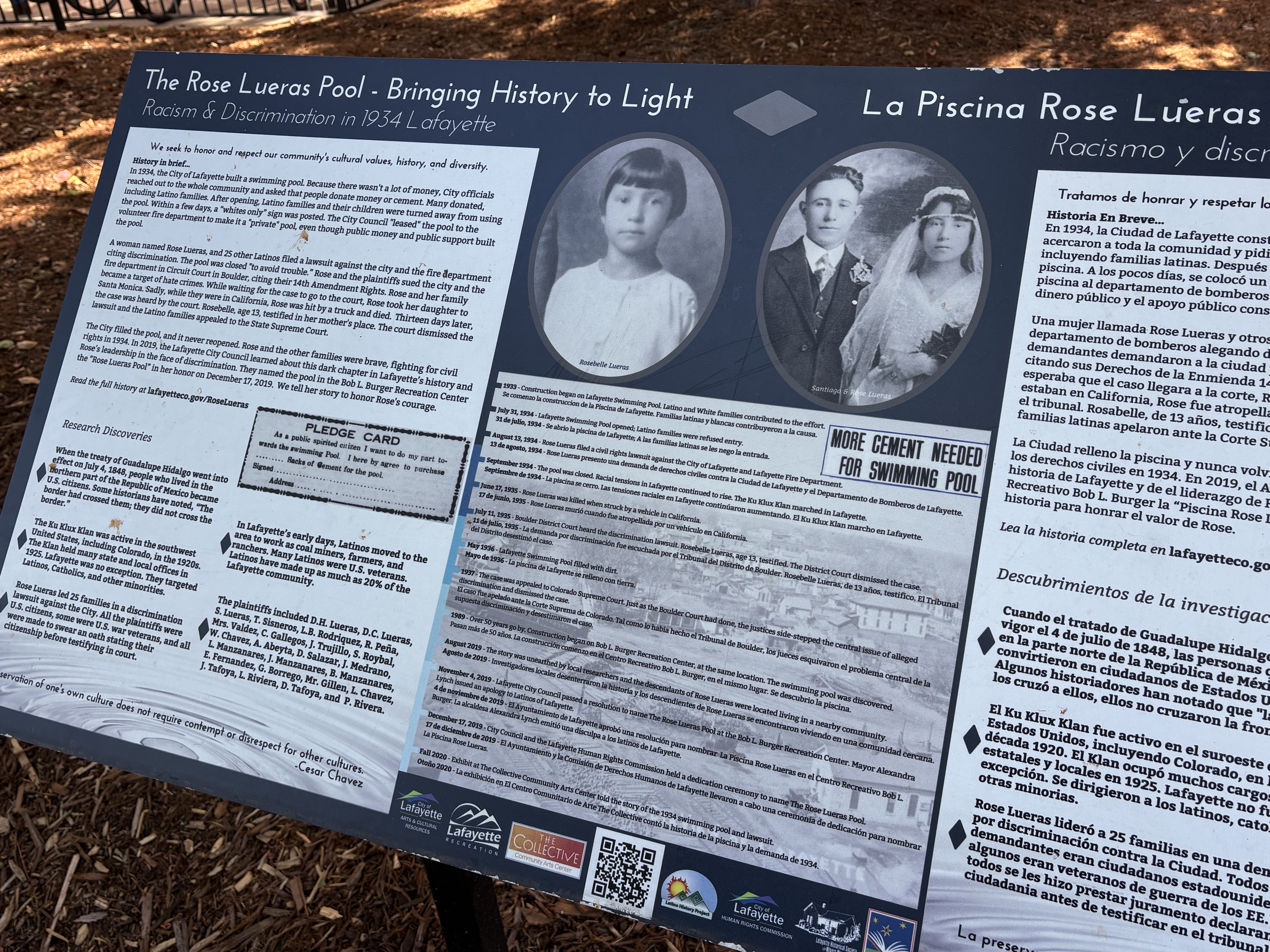
Historic interpretive sign outside of the Lafayette swimming pool.

== Proceedings ==
The action was filed in Boulder County District Court on August 13, 1934 (Case No. 9509), under the Colorado Declaratory Judgments Act. Rose Lueras was named as the lead plaintiff and was joined by approximately twenty-five other residents. The case was heard on July 11, 1935.

Testimony was presented regarding the construction of the public swimming pool, the town's decision to lease it to the volunteer fire department, and the manner in which access to the facility was restricted. Witnesses described being denied entry and referred to posted signage limiting use of the pool to white residents.

Rose Lueras died in June 1935 while the case was pending. Following her death, her thirteen-year-old daughter, Rosabelle Lueras, testified in the proceedings.

At trial in district court, testimony was presented from community members, including local officials and residents, regarding the circumstances surrounding the pool’s opening and its racially discriminatory operation. Witnesses described efforts by the town council to lease the pool to the volunteer fire department, and evidence of exclusionary practices at the facility. Despite this testimony, the district court ruled against the plaintiffs, finding that the evidence did not sufficiently establish a legal violation of the petitioners’ rights.

The plaintiffs, represented by counsel, appealed the district court’s decision to the Supreme Court of Colorado. The appeal raised the issue of whether the trial court had erred in its factual and legal conclusions, particularly with respect to alleged conspiracy and discriminatory exclusion from a public facility.

On March 8, 1937, the Colorado Supreme Court issued its opinion in Lueras v. Town of Lafayette (65 P.2d 1431, 100 Colo. 124), affirming the lower court’s judgment. The Supreme Court held that the evidence presented was “indefinite and uncertain” and insufficient to support the plaintiffs’ claims of conspiracy or discriminatory exclusion by the town or the fire department. The court also concluded that the fire department was not shown to have been acting as a governmental agency under town control for purposes of liability.

The ruling effectively ended the plaintiffs’ legal challenge in state court, and the pool never reopened for public use.

== Outcome ==
On March 8, 1937, the Colorado Supreme Court affirmed the district court's dismissal of the case. The court held that the plaintiffs had not presented sufficient evidence to establish a conspiracy involving the town. The court also held that the volunteer fire department had not acted as a municipal agency under town control.

Following the ruling, the Lafayette swimming pool never reopened for public use. Local histories note that in May 1936, the pool was filled in. It was replaced decades later by what is now the Bob L. Burger Recreation Center’s aquatic facilities.

Though the plaintiffs were unsuccessful in court, Rose Lueras’s challenge and its historical significance have been recognized in later years through community efforts. In 2019, the city of Lafayette dedicated the municipal pool at the Bob L. Burger Recreation Center in her honor, reflecting a contemporary acknowledgment of her role in fighting racial discrimination in public accommodations.

== Public and legal reaction ==
Newspapers at the time focused on the court's disposition of the case rather than on civil rights implication. Reporting generally summarized the court's finding that the plaintiff's had failed to establish a legally sufficient claim.

The ruling did not results in immediate changes to access to public buildings in Lafayette. The swimming pool did not reopen for public use.

In later decades, the case has been discussed by historians, journalists, and local historians interested in the history of racial segregation in Colorado. Media coverage has focused on Rose Lueras' role in challenging discriminatory practices and has framed the case within a broader pattern of exclusion affecting Latino communities in Colorado during the early 20th century.

Local historical organizations and museums have also referenced the case in exhibits and educational materials dealing with Lafayette's history.

== Significance ==
Lueras v. Town of Lafayette is one of few court cases in Colorado during the early 20th century in which residents challenged racial exclusion from a publicly funded facility. The case provides evidence of how segregation was implemented at a local level through informal administrative arrangements rather than explicit municipal ordinances.

The decision is cited as an example of the legal limits of civil rights claims prior to the expansion of federal equal protection. The Colorado Supreme Court's decision focused on questions of agency, pleading sufficiency, and proof of conspiracy as opposed to the constitutionality of racial exclusion itself.

The case has been referenced in discussions of Latino civil activism in Colorado. The lawsuit has been used by scholars and local historians to show the obstacles faced by minority plaintiffs seeking relief through courts of that period.
