= Edgewater, Colorado =

Home rule city in Jefferson County, Colorado, US

- Home rule city
- City of Edgewater
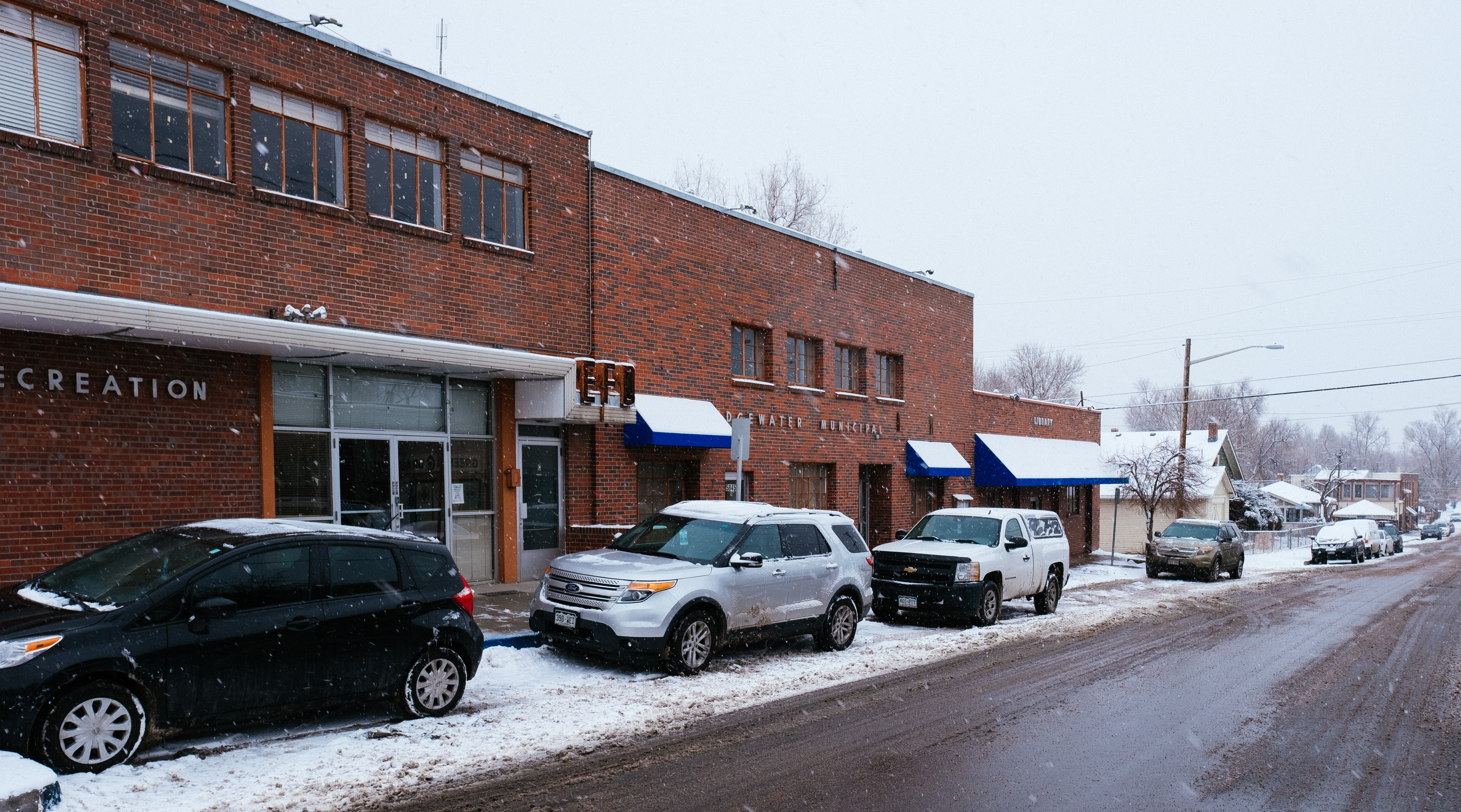
- Edgewater Municipal Buildings

- Flag Logo
- Nickname: The Edge
- Motto: The City of Choice
- Location of the City of Edgewater in Jefferson County, Colorado
- Coordinates: 39°44′58″N 105°03′44″W
- Country: United States
- State: Colorado
- County: Jefferson
- Incorporated: November 5, 1904

Government
  - Type: Home rule city
  - Mayor: John Beltrone

Area
  - Total: 0.695 sq mi (1.799 km^{2})
  - Land: 0.695 sq mi (1.799 km^{2})
  - Water: 0 sq mi (0.000 km^{2})
- Elevation: 5,368 ft (1,636 m)

Population (2020)
  - Total: 5,005
  - Density: 7,206/sq mi (2,782/km^{2})
- Time zone: UTC−07:00 (MST)
  - Summer (DST): UTC−06:00 (MDT)
- ZIP code: 80214
- Area codes: 303/720/983
- GNIS city ID: 2410399
- FIPS code: 08-23135
- Website: www.edgewaterco.gov

The City of Edgewater is a home rule city located in Jefferson County, Colorado, United States. The city population was 5,005 at the 2020 United States census. Edgewater is surrounded by Denver to the east, Lakewood to the south and west, and Wheat Ridge to the north. The city is a part of the Denver-Aurora-Centennial, CO Metropolitan Statistical Area and the Front Range Urban Corridor.

== History ==
Edgewater was named for its lakefront location at Sloan's Lake. The Edgewater, Colorado, post office opened on March 1, 1892, and the Town of Edgewater was incorporated on November 5, 1904.

== Geography ==
At the 2020 United States census, the town had a total area of 445 acres (1.799 km^{2}). Sloan's Lake, a lake that once extended into Edgewater, now lies entirely within the city limits of Denver just to the east of Edgewater.

=== Climate ===
Edgewater features a Semi-arid climate, with low annual precipitation. Due to Edgewater bordering the city and county of Denver, the climates are almost exactly the same, with only a few differences. Annual snowfall is generally a bit less in Edgewater, and the high temperatures are also a few degrees warmer, because Denver temperatures are recorded at the Denver International Airport, which is actually east of the Denver metro area.

Summers are hot and dry, while winters can vary from cool to cold, with snowfall not uncommon in winter months. However, snowfall is short lived in arid and sunny climates, usually melting in a day or sometimes before nightfall. Normal summer highs range from the upper 80s (°F) to the mid 90s, with upper 90 °F (32 °C) days very common, and even a few days over 100 °F (38 °C) as well. Normal winter highs range from the mid 40s to the mid 50s, with upper 50 °F (10 °C) and lower 60 °F (16 °C) days very common as well. Sunshine is abundant throughout the year, averaging over 300 days of sun per year.

Climate data for Edgewater, Colorado
Month	Jan	Feb	Mar	Apr	May	Jun	Jul	Aug	Sep	Oct	Nov	Dec	Year
Mean daily maximum °F (°C)	45.8 (7.7)	50.5 (10.3)	53.3 (11.8)	62.8 (17.1)	72.3 (22.4)	84.9 (29.4)	90.1 (32.3)	88.7 (31.5)	81.3 (27.4)	70.7 (21.5)	56.2 (13.4)	49.1 (9.5)	67.2 (19.6)
Mean daily minimum °F (°C)	17.2 (−8.2)	21.5 (−5.8)	24.5 (−4.2)	33.5 (0.8)	42.5 (5.8)	51.5 (10.8)	56.3 (13.5)	54.6 (12.6)	45.6 (7.6)	35.6 (2.0)	25.4 (−3.7)	20.6 (−6.3)	35.7 (2.1)
Average precipitation inches (mm)	0.70 (18)	0.80 (20)	1.12 (28)	1.84 (47)	2.99 (76)	1.52 (39)	1.53 (39)	1.42 (36)	1.13 (29)	0.92 (23)	0.76 (19)	0.48 (12)	15.22 (387)
Average snowfall inches (cm)	7.7 (20)	7.0 (18)	9.2 (23)	6.0 (15)	0.7 (1.8)	0 (0)	0 (0)	0 (0)	0 (0)	0.9 (2.3)	3.3 (8.4)	3.5 (8.9)	38.4 (98)
Source: http://www.wrcc.dri.edu/summary/climsmco.html

== Demographics ==
Historical population
Census	Pop.	Note	%±
1910	712		—
1920	664		−6.7%
1930	1,473		121.8%
1940	1,648		11.9%
1950	2,580		56.6%
1960	4,314		67.2%
1970	4,910		13.8%
1980	4,766		−2.9%
1990	4,613		−3.2%
2000	5,445		18.0%
2010	5,170		−5.1%
2020	5,005		−3.2%
U.S. Decennial Census

=== 2020 census ===
As of the 2020 census, Edgewater had a population of 5,005. The median age was 34.2 years. 17.3% of residents were under the age of 18 and 9.9% of residents were 65 years of age or older. For every 100 females there were 98.3 males, and for every 100 females age 18 and over there were 99.6 males age 18 and over.

100.0% of residents lived in urban areas, while 0.0% lived in rural areas.

There were 2,314 households in Edgewater, of which 23.8% had children under the age of 18 living in them. Of all households, 29.1% were married-couple households, 27.3% were households with a male householder and no spouse or partner present, and 31.1% were households with a female householder and no spouse or partner present. About 33.3% of all households were made up of individuals and 7.5% had someone living alone who was 65 years of age or older.

There were 2,448 housing units, of which 5.5% were vacant. The homeowner vacancy rate was 0.6% and the rental vacancy rate was 5.1%.

Racial composition as of the 2020 census
Race	Number	Percent
White	3,155	63.0%
Black or African American	122	2.4%
American Indian and Alaska Native	90	1.8%
Asian	92	1.8%
Native Hawaiian and Other Pacific Islander	9	0.2%
Some other race	775	15.5%
Two or more races	762	15.2%
Hispanic or Latino (of any race)	1,764	35.2%

=== 2010 census ===
As of the April 2010 census, there were 5,170 people, 2,698 households, and 1,329 families in the city. The population density was 7,630.4 inhabitants per square mile (2,946.1 inhabitants/km^{2}). There were 2,424 housing units at an average density of 3,396.9 per square mile (1,311.6/km^{2}). In the city, the population was spread out, with 23.8% under the age of 18, 7.2% from 18 to 24, 39.5% from 25 to 44, 20.1% from 45 to 64, and 9.4% who were 65 years of age or older. The median age was 33 years. For every 100 females, there were 100.2 males. For every 100 females age 18 and over, there were 98.9 males. The median income for a household in the city was $42,072, and the median income for a family was $42,815. The per capita income for the city was $22,696. About 17.5% of families and 23.2% of the population were below the poverty line, including 28.2% of those under age 18 and 12.3% of those age 65 or over.

The racial breakdown according to the April 2010 census:

- White 50.7%
- African American 2.7%
- Asian American 1.3%
- Hispanic or Latino 44.7%
- Other Race 0.3%
- An estimated 7.4% of the population were of two or more races.

=== Demographic estimates ===
Approximately 10.7% of the population that reside in Edgewater are not United States citizens. 14.3% of the population are foreign born United States citizens. The median house or condo value in 2009 was $199,114 and the median rent in 2009 was $702. An estimated 26.9% of the population over age 5 speak only Spanish at home. An estimated 48.9% of the housing are rentals, while 51.1% are owner occupied housing.

== Infrastructure ==
=== Public services ===
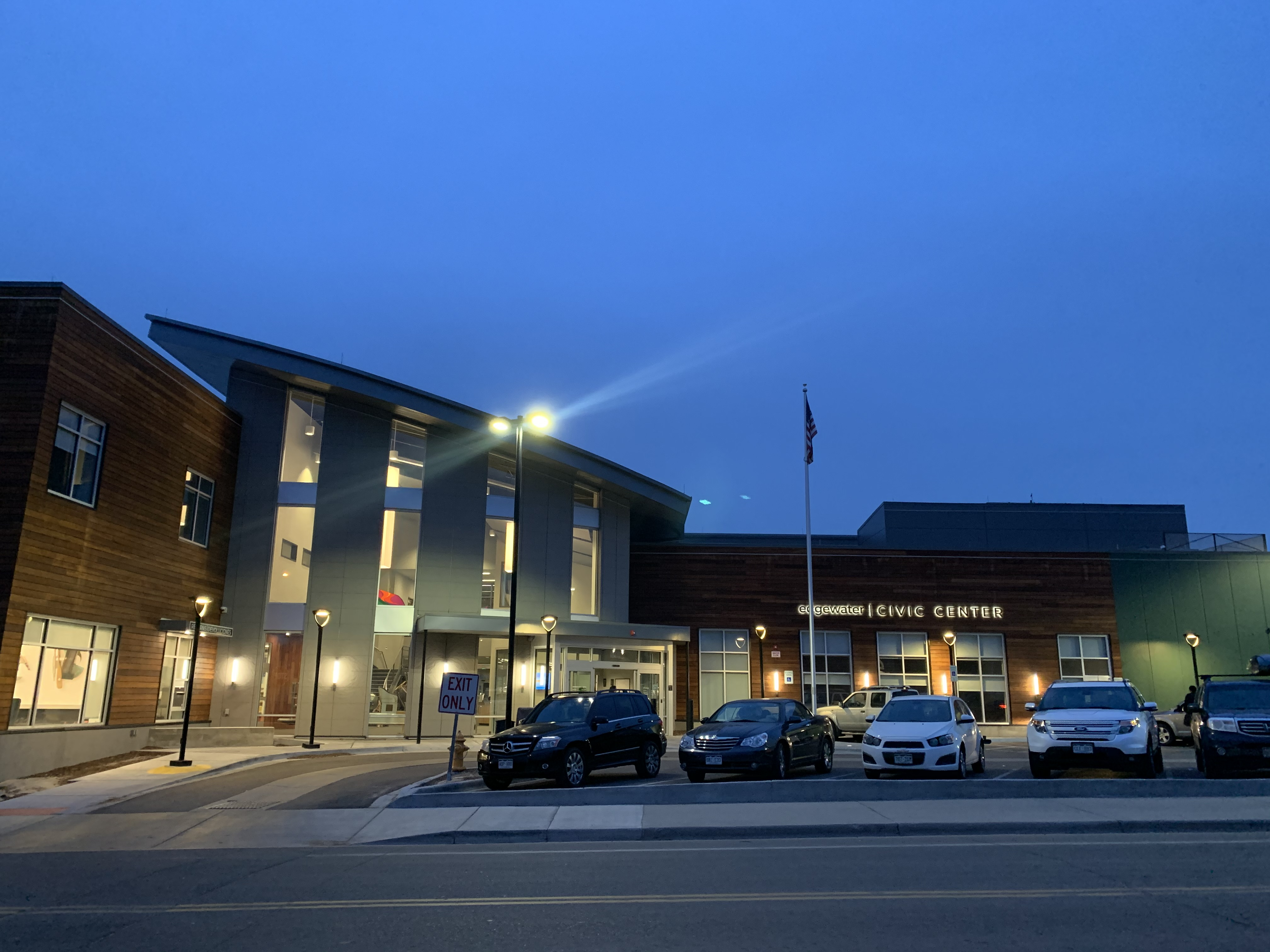
The Edgewater Civic Center is located at 1800 Harlan Street

The Edgewater Police Department is organized into three divisions with an authorized strength of fifteen officers and four civilian employees, with three part-time civilian employees working for the department and municipal court. The police department uses the Jefferson County Combined Communications Center as their dispatch and 911 center.

In November 2012, voters in Edgewater voted to disband the fire department and join the neighboring Wheat Ridge Fire Protection District.

Since 2016, Edgewater fire and EMS services have been provided by West Metro Fire Rescue after Wheat Ridge Fire Protection District voters decided to join the West Metro Fire Protection District.

Schools in Edgewater are Edgewater Elementary, Lumberg Elementary, and Jefferson High School.

== Notable people ==
Notable individuals who were born in or have lived in Edgewater include:

- Nell Brinkley (1886–1944), Illustrator
- Roy H. McVicker (1924–1973), U.S. Representative from Colorado
- Alan J. Pfeuffer, Federal Public Defender, Edgewater Police Chief
- Johnnie Seale (1938- ), baseball pitcher

== See also ==
- Front Range Urban Corridor
