= The Colorado Lawyer =

Colorado Lawyer
- Discipline: Law
- Language: English
- Edited by: Susie Klein

Publication details
- History: 1971–present
- Publisher: Colorado Bar Association (United States)
- Frequency: Monthly

Standard abbreviations
- Bluebook: Colo. Law.
- ISO 4: Colo. Lawyer

Indexing
- ISSN: 0363-7867
- LCCN: 76646274
- OCLC no.: 2038795

Links
- Journal homepage; Monthly Archive

Colorado Lawyer (commonly abbreviated Colo. Law.) is a monthly bar journal published by the Colorado Bar Association. The journal was established in 1971, and the managing editor is Susie Klein.
