= Colorado Alliance for Immigration Reform =

Colorado Alliance for Immigration Reform is an activist organization based in Lakewood, Colorado. The group has been listed as an anti-immigrant hate group by the Southern Poverty Law Center.
