= George E. Lohr =

American judge (1931–2015)

George E. Lohr (July 15, 1931 – March 19, 2015) was an associate justice of the Colorado Supreme Court from 1979 to 1997.

Born in South Dakota, Lohr received an undergraduate degree in Civil Engineering from South Dakota State University in 1953, and a law degree from the University of Michigan Law School in 1958. Lohr moved to Aspen, Colorado, and became a state district court judge there, presiding over trials of serial killer Ted Bundy, and of actress Claudine Longet, who shot her ski instructor lover.

Lohr was appointed by Governor Richard Lamm to a seat on the state supreme court vacated by the resignation of Justice Jim Carrigan. He served for seventeen years, until his retirement, after which he remained a senior judge until 2006.

Political offices
Preceded by Jim Carrigan	Justice of the Colorado Supreme Court; 1979–1997	Succeeded by Michael L. Bender
