= Jean Dubofsky =

American judge

- Born: 1942 (age 83–84)
- Education: Stanford University; Harvard Law School
- Known for: First female justice on the Colorado Supreme Court; Lead attorney overturning Amendment 2 before the U.S. Supreme Court - landmark ruling for LBGT rights
- Awards: Colorado Women's Hall of Fame, 2008

Jean Dubofsky (born 1942) is the first woman to become a Colorado Supreme Court Justice and a former Deputy Attorney General for Colorado. She was the lead attorney in Romer v. Evans, the case that overturned Colorado Amendment 2 at the US Supreme Court, resulting in a landmark ruling for LGBT rights in the United States.

== Early life ==
Dubofsky was born in 1942 and grew up in Topeka, Kansas. As a senior in high school, she won the national Betty Crocker Search for the All-American Homemaker of Tomorrow scholarship, and met Mamie Eisenhower and Richard Nixon.

== Career ==
Dubofsky went to Stanford University as an undergraduate, and then got a degree from Harvard Law School in 1967.

She served as legislative assistant to U.S. Senator Walter Mondale from 1967 to 1969, then moved to Boulder, Colorado to practice law there.

In 1975 she was appointed Deputy Attorney General for Colorado.

In 1979, Dubofsky became the first female justice on the Colorado Supreme Court and the youngest person ever appointed to the court, at age 37. She was the 11th woman to be appointed to any state supreme court. She served there until 1987.

Dubofsky returned to private practice in 1988.

== Amendment 2 ==
In 1992, Colorado citizens voted for Amendment 2, a ballot initiative which banned state and local laws prohibiting discrimination on the basis of sexual orientation. According to public opinion surveys, Coloradans strongly opposed discrimination based upon sexual orientation, but proponents of Amendment 2 saw it as prohibiting affirmative action based upon sexual orientation.

Jean Dubofsky led the team which filed a lawsuit, Romer v. Evans, against the law two weeks after it passed. In 1993 a state court granted a preliminary injunction to prevent the law from taking effect and thereby overturning local laws in Boulder, Denver and Aspen. She argued the case before the Supreme Court of the United States in 1995, and the court ruled the law unconstitutional in 1996 by a 6–3 vote. The majority opinion found that it violated the Equal Protection Clause since it "classifies homosexuals not to further a proper legislative end but to make them unequal to everyone else". The decision was seen as a landmark, setting the stage for other rulings, including Obergefell v. Hodges in 2015, overturning state bans on same-sex marriage.

== Awards ==
- American Bar Association Margaret Brent Women Lawyers of Achievement Award Recipient, 1994
- American Civil Liberties Union Carle Whitehead Memorial Award for "exceptional commitment and dedication to civil liberties and the state of Colorado", 1993
- Colorado Women's Hall of Fame, 2008

== See also ==
- List of female state supreme court justices
