= Joseph R. Quinn =

American judge (1932–2023)

Joseph R. Quinn (November 18, 1932 – May 18, 2023) was an American attorney and judge who served as a justice of the Colorado Supreme Court from 1980 to 1993, including service as chief justice from 1985 to 1990.

== Early life, education, and career ==
Born in Elizabeth, New Jersey, the eldest of three brothers, Quinn attended St. Peter's Preparatory School, and served in the United States Marine Corps during the Korean War, achieving the rank of sergeant. After his military service, received a B.A. from St. Peter's College, graduating with honors in 1957. He received an LL.B. from Rutgers Law School in 1961.

Quinn then moved to Denver, Colorado, where he became a legal aide to Colorado Supreme Court Chief Justice Leonard V. B. Sutton. After the United States Supreme Court recognized a constitutional right to counsel for indigent criminal defendants in Gideon v. Wainwright (1963), Quinn became one of the early appointees to Colorado's newly established public defender's office. Quinn viewed the position as placing him "on the cutting edge of the most important legal developments of the time", despite long hours and arduous work. When the Colorado State Public Defender's Office was established by statute in 1970, Quinn became its first Chief Trial Deputy.

In 1971, Quinn left government service and entered private practice as a criminal defense attorney as a partner in the firm of Sherman, Quinn and Sherman, and also taught law, before being appointed to the Denver District Court.

== Judicial service ==
Quinn served as a district judge of Colorado's 2nd Judicial District, encompassing the City and County of Denver, for seven and a half years.

As a Denver District Court judge, Quinn presided over Lujan v. Colorado State Board of Education, a constitutional challenge to Colorado's system of financing public education. The plaintiffs argued that disparities in school funding violated the Colorado Constitution's requirement that the state maintain a "thorough and uniform system" of public schools. Quinn ruled that wealth-based disparities in educational funding interfered with a fundamental right to education. His decision was reversed by the Colorado Supreme Court in a 4–2 decision. Writing for the majority, Chief Justice Paul V. Hodges concluded that the Colorado Constitution "does not forbid disparities in wealth."

In 1980, Governor Richard Lamm appointed Quinn to a seat on the Colorado Supreme Court. Quinn took the oath of office on June 3 of that year. Although the appointment received broad support within the legal profession, demonstrators picketed Quinn's swearing-in because of his suppression ruling in the murder prosecution People v. Lowe. Quinn had concluded that statements and physical evidence should be suppressed because police questioning violated the requirements of Miranda v. Arizona. The Colorado Supreme Court unanimously affirmed his ruling. Among Quinn's better-known opinions was People v. Sporleder (1983), in which he wrote that individuals have a reasonable expectation of privacy in the telephone numbers they dial and that police generally must obtain a warrant before installing a pen register or similar monitoring device. In People v. Medina (1985), Quinn held that the state could not forcibly administer antipsychotic medication to an incompetent patient absent proof that the patient posed a serious danger to himself or others. Rejecting reliance on speculative future harm, he wrote that allowing involuntary medication on such a basis would be "irreconcilable with the personal dignity of the individual" and would reduce the patient's interest in bodily integrity to "nothing more than an illusion".

Quinn was chosen by his fellow justices to serve as chief justice in 1985, when Chief Justice William H. Erickson stepped down from the role. Quinn served as chief justice until July 1, 1990, when he stepped down from the position, thereafter remaining an associate justice until his retirement from the court in 1993.

== Personal life ==
Quinn and his wife Olga, who had married in 1962, had five children. As a child, Quinn dreamed of being a Major League Baseball player, and he remained a sports fan throughout his life, following the Denver Nuggets and the Colorado Rockies, and running 20 miles a week.

Quinn died on May 18, 2023, at the age of 90.

Political offices
Preceded by James K. Groves	Justice of the Colorado Supreme Court; 1980–1993	Succeeded by Gregory K. Scott
Preceded by William H. Erickson	Chief Justice of the Colorado Supreme Court; 1985–1990	Succeeded by Luis D. Rovira
