= Colorado Bar Association =

Bar association in Colorado

The Colorado Bar Association
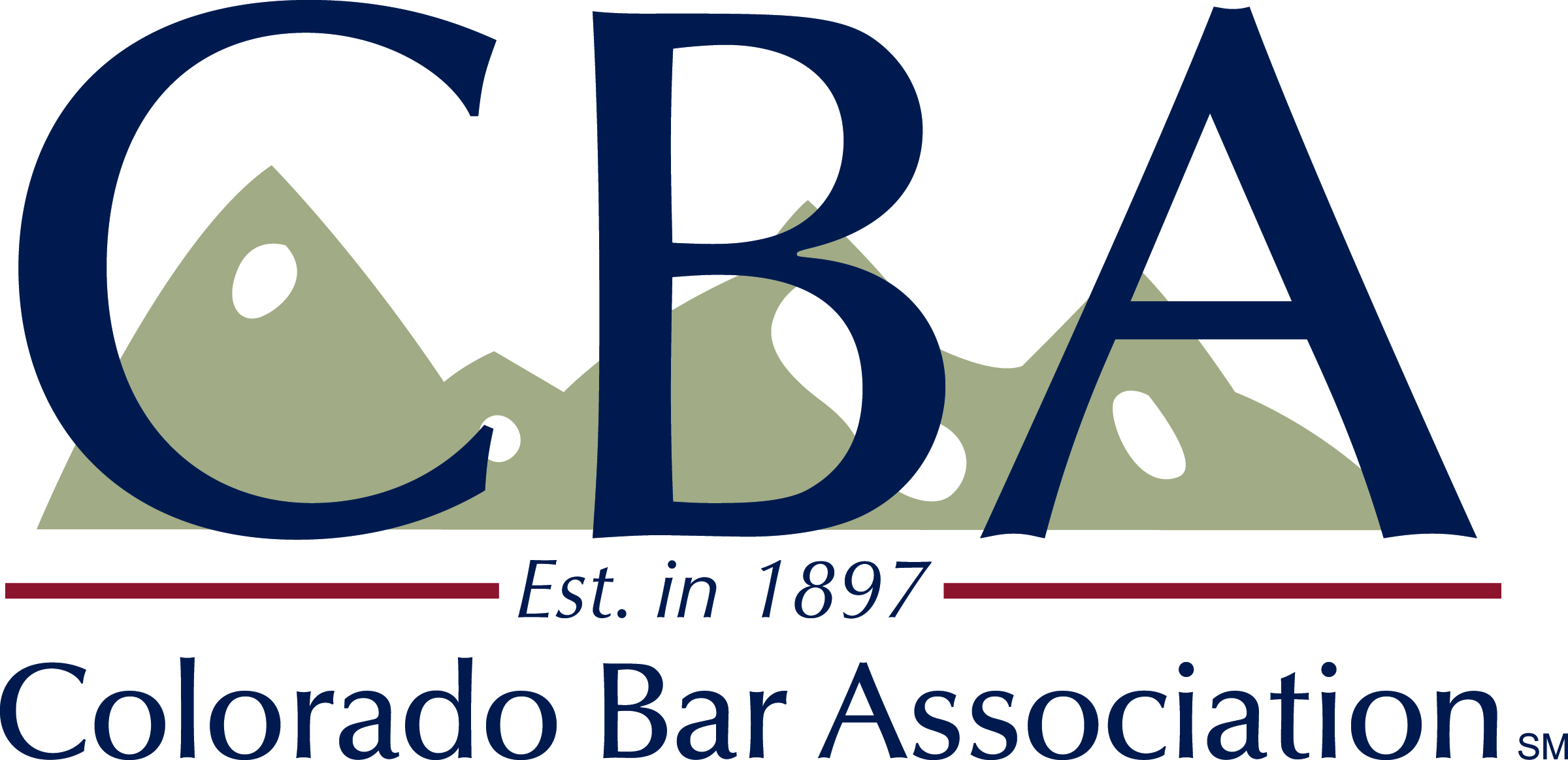
- Type: Legal Society
- Headquarters: Denver, Colorado
- Location: United States
- Members: 18,000 in 2012 (73% of all active Colorado attorneys)
- Website: http://www.cobar.org/

The Colorado State Bar Association (CBA), founded in 1897, is a voluntary bar association for the state of Colorado.

The earliest bar association in what is now Colorado was the Weld County Bar Association, founded by three lawyers in or after 1870.

A 21-member board of governors is elected on an annual basis, except for an executive director, who is hired by the board itself.

CBA is the publisher of a monthly journal, The Colorado Lawyer.
