= Mary Mullarkey =

American judge (1943–2021)

Mary Jane Mullarkey (September 28, 1943 – March 31, 2021) was a chief justice of the Colorado Supreme Court and the first female Supreme Court chief justice in the state of Colorado. She was inducted into the Colorado Women's Hall of Fame in 2012.

== Biography ==
Mullarkey was born on September 28, 1943, to John and Isabelle Mullarkey in New London, Wisconsin. She would attend St. Norbert College and Harvard Law School. On July 24, 1971, she married Thomas E. Korson.

== Career ==
Mullarkey began her career in Washington, D.C., with the Office of the Solicitor, U.S. Department of the Interior. Here, she represented federal agencies in water, environmental, and civil rights cases.

Later, Mullarkey developed expertise in race and gender discrimination cases under Title VII of the 1964 Civil Rights Act. That led to a position at the Equal Employment Opportunity Commission Office in Denver, CO in 1973. Mullarkey then went to work for the office of the Colorado Attorney General, where she first worked on appeals under attorney general J.D. MacFarlane, then transitioned to the position of solicitor general. In that role, Mullarkey was lead counsel for the state in major appellate cases from 1975 to 1982. From 1982 to 1985 Mullarkey served as the chief advisor to Governor Dick Lamm.

Governor Roy Romer appointed Mullarkey to the Colorado Supreme Court on June 29, 1987. In 1998, Mullarkey was chosen by her fellow justices as the first female chief justice in the state's history. She took over the center chair on Aug. 3, 1998 and served as chief justice for 12 years. Mullarkey's tenure as chief justice was the longest of any Colorado chief justice and continued until her retirement on November 30, 2010.

During her 23-year tenure on the Colorado Supreme Court, Mullarkey heard more than 30,000 cases and authored 472 opinions. She helped to increase Colorado's number of judges by 27 percent, remodel courthouses, institute judicial training and juror appreciation programs, and turn Colorado's judicial system into a national technological model.

Mullarkey instituted a rule that all court buildings must have waiting rooms that provide children with a safe place to stay during their parents' court appearances. Prior to retiring, Mullarkey worked to bring to fruition the state-of-the-art Ralph L. Carr Colorado Judicial Center in Denver.

Mary Mullarkey died March 31, 2021, at the age of 77.
