= Colorado Supreme Court =

Highest court in the U.S. state of Colorado

Coordinates: 39.738136°N 104.986741°W

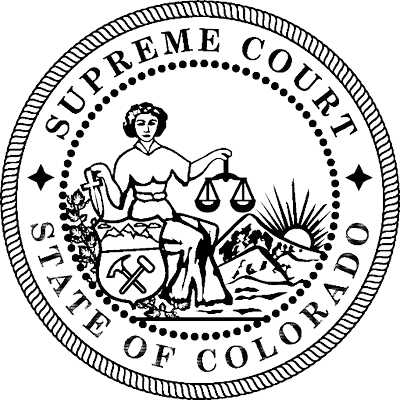
- Interactive map of Colorado Supreme Court
- Established: 1876
- Jurisdiction: Colorado
- Location: Denver, Colorado, U.S.
- Composition method: Missouri plan with retention elections
- Authorised by: Colorado State Constitution
- Appeals to: Supreme Court of the United States (for matters involving federal law or the U.S. Constitution only)
- Judge term length: 10 years
- Number of positions: 7
- Website: www.courts.state.co.us/Courts/Supreme_Court/

Chief Justice
- Currently: Monica Márquez
- Since: July 26, 2024

The Colorado Supreme Court is the highest court in the U.S. state of Colorado. Located in Denver, the court was established in 1876. It consists of a Chief Justice and six Associate Justices who are appointed by the Governor of Colorado from a list of candidates approved by a state judicial commission. Each justice faces a retention election two years after their appointment and every ten years thereafter, with mandatory retirement at age 72.

== Powers and duties ==
=== Appellate jurisdiction ===
==== Discretionary appeals ====
The Court principally handles certiorari petitions, which request the Court to conduct an additional review of the case. These petitions follow a primary review that is conducted by either the Colorado Court of Appeals or the Colorado District Court. The Colorado Supreme Court is not required to hear these cases.

Only a small fraction of certiorari petitions is granted by the Colorado Supreme Court. From petitions filed in 2015 and 2016, only 6% of all cases were granted an additional review. It takes three of the seven justices to vote in favor of a certiorari petition for it to be granted.

==== Appeals of right ====
In addition, the Colorado Supreme Court has jurisdiction over direct appeals in cases where a trial court finds a law unconstitutional, in death penalty cases, in water law cases, in certain election cases, in interlocutory appeals (i.e., appeals in the middle of a case) in certain matters of exceptional importance for which an ordinary appeal is not a sufficient remedy, and in certain other cases.

=== Original jurisdiction and supervisory powers ===
The Colorado Supreme Court also has original jurisdiction over attorney discipline proceedings, over advisory questions presented by the state legislature or the state attorney general, and questions referred to it by the federal courts. Furthermore, the Colorado Supreme Court has general supervisory and budget authority over the judicial branch, the court rule making process, and the regulation of attorneys. Finally, the Colorado Supreme Court makes appointments to a number of boards and commissions, which often has the effect of providing a tie breaking member in situations where the other appointees are equally divided on partisan lines.

== Membership ==
=== Current makeup ===
The current Colorado Supreme Court's membership, and the date each justice was appointed, is as follows:

Name	Born	Start	Chief term	Term ends	Mandatory retirement (Note: Justices must retire when they reach the age of 72.)	Appointer	Law school
Monica Márquez, Chief Justice	April 20, 1969 (age 57)	December 10, 2010 (Note: Originally appointed as an Associate Justice; elected unanimously as Chief Justice and sworn in on July 26, 2024.)	2024–present	January 9, 2035	2041	Bill Ritter (D)	Yale
Brian Boatright	June 16, 1962 (age 64)	November 1, 2011	2021–2024	January 9, 2035	2034	John Hickenlooper (D)	Denver
William W. Hood III	1963 (age 62–63)	January 13, 2014	–	January 8, 2037	2035	John Hickenlooper (D)	Virginia
Richard L. Gabriel	March 3, 1962 (age 64)	September 1, 2015	–	January 9, 2029	2034	John Hickenlooper (D)	Penn
Carlos Samour	1966 or 1967 (age 59–60)	July 2, 2018	–	January 14, 2031	2039	John Hickenlooper (D)	Denver
Maria Berkenkotter	1962 or 1963 (age 62–63)	January 4, 2021	–	January 9, 2035	2035	Jared Polis (D)	Denver
Susan Blanco	1977 or 1978 (age 48–49)	February 17, 2026	–	January 9, 2029	2049	Jared Polis (D)	Boulder

=== Appointment process ===
When a vacancy on the court occurs, a commission established by the state constitution reviews submitted applications. The commission submits three names to the Governor. The Governor of Colorado then has 15 days to select the next justice from that list.

The justice selected serves a provisional two-year term before facing a retention election. The voters then chose whether to retain or not retain the justice. If the justice is retained, they go on to serve a full 10-year term before the next retention election.

If a justice is not retained, the appointment process starts again. However, no appellate judge has ever lost a retention election since the system was put in place in 1966. The Justices are not elected as partisan officials, although they are initially appointed by a partisan elected official.

In 2006, an effort to change this system of retaining judges by initiative was rejected by voters, in part due to a campaign against the initiative which had strong support from both Democratic and Republican members of the Colorado Bar Association.

The chief justice is selected by the justices from among themselves.

=== Yearly pay ===
The pay is set by the legislature in the yearly budget. The budget year in Colorado starts on July 1.

==== 2006 ====
- Chief Justice – $125,656
- Associate Justice – $122,972

==== 2016 ====
- Chief Justice of the Supreme Court earned $176,799 per year.

==== 2017 – 2018 ====
- Chief Justice – $181,219
- Associate Justice – $177,350

==== 2018 – 2019 ====
- Chief Justice – $186,656
- Associate Justice – $182,671

==== 2019 – 2020 ====
- Chief Justice – $192,256
- Associate Justice – $188,151

== Court building ==
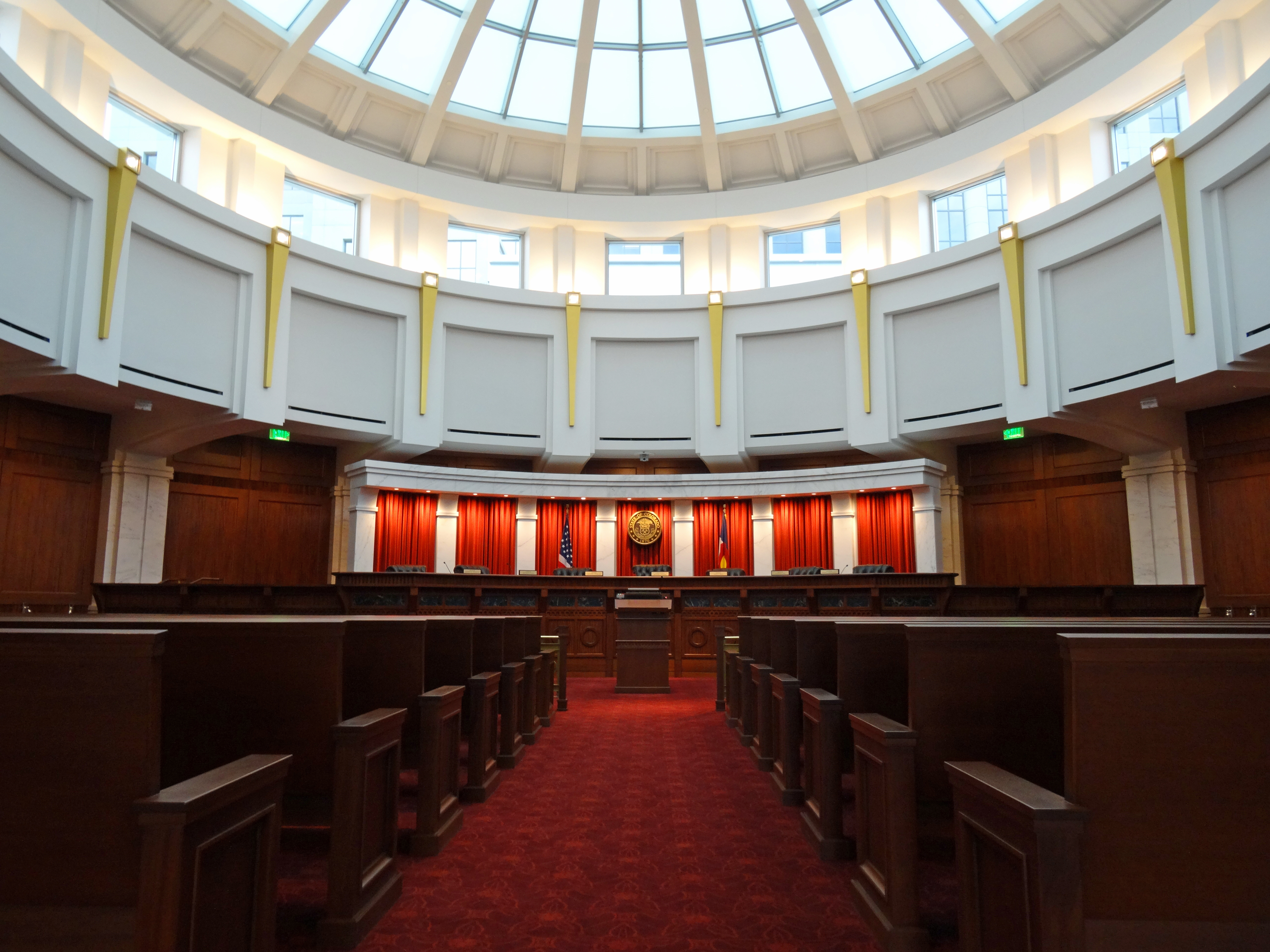
The Colorado Supreme Court courtroom

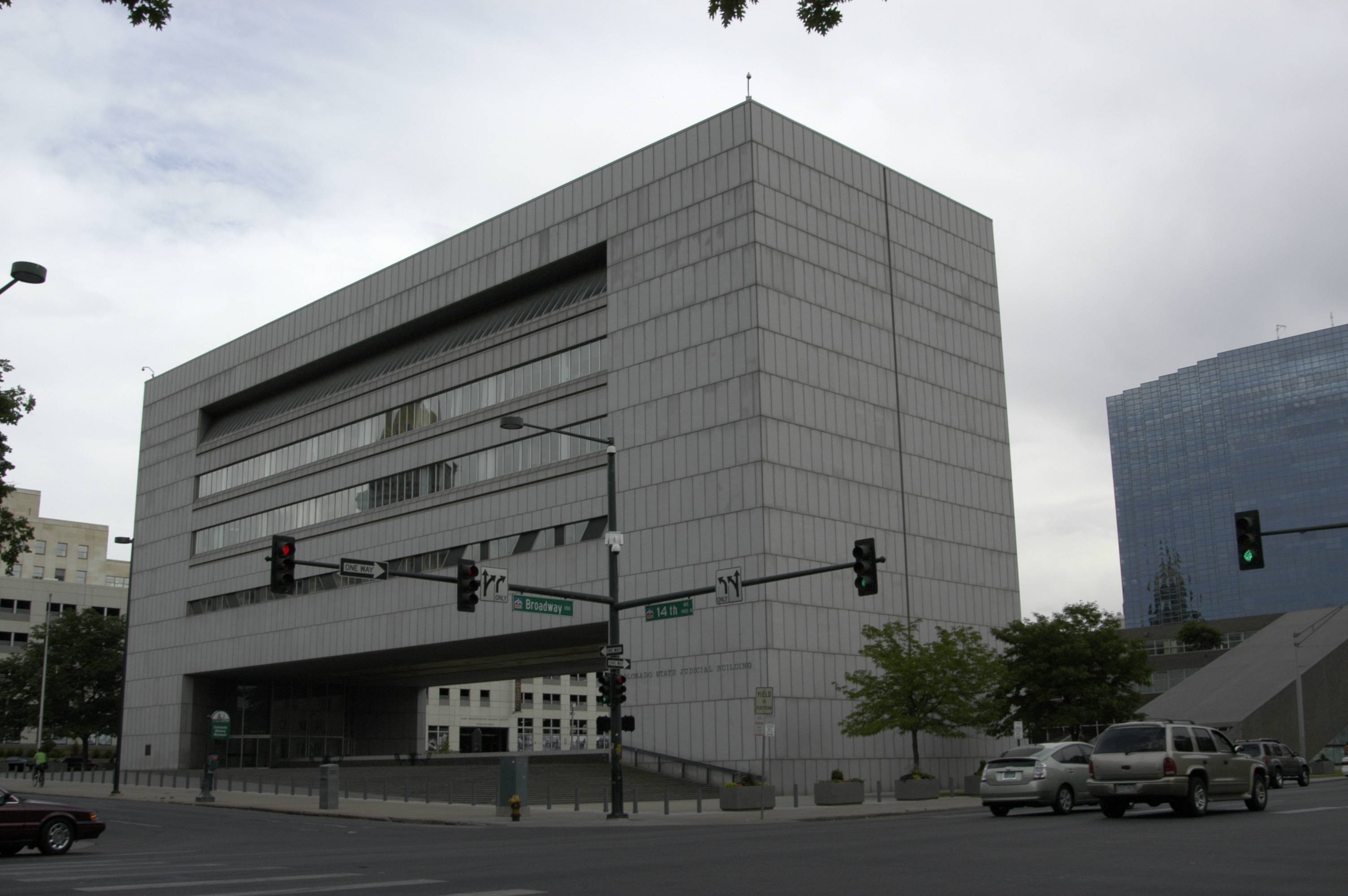
Former Colorado State Judicial Building, since demolished

While there is a chamber originally dedicated to the Colorado Supreme Court in the state capitol building, the Colorado Supreme Court and Colorado Court of Appeals were located in their own building across the street from the state capitol from 1977 to 2010. In August 2010 the building was imploded to make way for a larger court building. Construction of the new building began in September 2010. That new building, dubbed the Ralph L. Carr Colorado Judicial Center, opened in early 2013. Named for a former governor of Colorado, the building is located at 2 East 14th Avenue in Denver.

The State Supreme Court Building was a box-like structure raised off the ground by two square columns located on the east and west ends of the building. The only parts of the building actually on the ground level were the columns, which contained the entrances and elevators for the building.

The underside of the building featured a 150-foot mural designed by Colorado artist Angelo di Benedetto. It depicted several notable figures, including Hammurabi, Moses and Martin Luther King Jr. The figures represented persons who are believed to have made significant contributions to law and justice. Directly beneath the mural was a large window embedded into the ground that looked down into the underground law library. Persons in the library were able to look up onto the mural via the ground level glass window. The mural was removed before the building was demolished, but its ultimate fate is uncertain.

The courtroom itself was located on the fifth floor of the building (the ground level columns being the first floor). The entrance to the courtroom consisted of two large brass colored metallic doors with a textured design on them. The courtroom was dimly lit with two stained glass windows depicting previous Supreme Court Justices. The well of the courtroom was circular, with a podium for counsel in the center. The podium was a circular column that resembled a container of lipstick that, unlike the rest of the courtroom, was well lit. It faced a semicircular bench with seats for seven justices. Behind the bench was a large drape through which the Justices entered the courtroom.

The former building was designed by John Rogers and RNL Design. See RNL Architecture.

The Ralph L. Carr Justice Center was designed by Fentress Architects. The judicial wing is four stories tall and contains the Supreme Court courtroom and chambers and Court of Appeals courtrooms. The justice center also includes an adjacent wing that is a twelve-story office tower containing the office of the State Attorney General as well as offices for other State agencies.

The new Justice Center is named for former Colorado Governor Ralph Lawrence Carr, who served from 1939 to 1943 and was noted for his opposition to Japanese American internment during World War II.

== Publication of opinions ==
All opinions of the Colorado Supreme Court are published. Court opinions are initially released as slip opinions and posted on the court's website. They are ultimately published in Westlaw's Pacific Reporter, a regional case reporter that is the designated official reporter for the State of Colorado. Westlaw also publishes the state-specific Colorado Reporter, repeating all Colorado cases from the Pacific Reporter and reusing that reporter's pagination and citations. The Colorado Bar Association also publishes all Colorado Supreme Court opinions in its monthly journal, The Colorado Lawyer.

Between 1864 and 1980, the State published its own official reporter, Colorado Reports. Concurrent coverage in the Pacific Reporter began in 1883.

== Notable cases ==
=== Lueras v. Lafayette, 1937 ===
- This was a Colorado Supreme Court case (65 P. 2d 1431) about racial discrimination at a public swimming pool in Lafayette. In the early 1930s, the town helped build the pool with public support. Many local residents were of Spanish descent and paid town taxes. After the pool was finished, the town leased it to the volunteer fire department, which ran the facility. Latino residents said they were denied entry. Witnesses described a sign that read "White trade only." Rose Lueras, a local resident, filed a lawsuit along with about twenty-five others. They argued that the pool was a public facility and that denying access based on race violated their rights under the Fourteenth Amendment and Colorado law. They also claimed the town and fire department worked together to exclude them. The town denied these claims. It argued that the fire department was not under town control and that there was no plan to discriminate. The case was first heard in district court in 1935. Testimony described how the pool was built, leased, and operated. Rose Lueras died while the case was still pending, and her teenage daughter later testified. The district court ruled against the plaintiffs. they appealed to the Colorado Supreme Court. In 1937, the court upheld the lower court's decision. It said the evidence was not clear enough to prove a conspiracy or direct town control of the fire department. After the ruling, the pool never reopened and was later filled in. Decades later, the city honored Rose Lueras for challenging discrimination. Today, the case is remembered as an early effort to fight racial exclusion in Colorado.

=== In re Ballot Title #3, 1996 ===
- Facts: The petitioners Hedges and Briggs brought a proposed Initiative that would repeal the Taxpayer Bill of Rights (TABOR), Colorado Constitution Article X, Section 20. The Title Board found the initiative violated the Colorado constitution's single subject clause for a ballot initiative.
- Issue: Did the Title Board make a mistake in finding the ballot initiative is more than a single subject?
- Decision: On May 13, 1996, five of the seven justices found the Title Board did make a mistake. Justice Gabriel wrote the decision; Chief Justice Coats, and Justices Hood, Hart, and Samour join. Their reasons included:
  - 1. The initiative only has one objective, the repeal of TABOR. The subjects of the initiative are connected and its subject matter is properly connected.
  - 2. There is nothing in the initiative that could be read to hide something, or pose a risk of surprise on the voters.
  - 3. The initiative was written simply and plainly.
- Analysis: Prior case law, determining that the repeal of a constitutional provision with multiple subjects violates the single subject clause, is not controlling here for a few reasons:
  - 1. In re Proposed Initiative 1996-4, 916 P.2d 528, 533 (Colo. 1996) only mentioned this principal in dicta, meaning that holding was done as a hypothetical and was not in resolving the case at hand.
  - 2. All other cases citing that holding referred back to the Proposed Initiative case without further analysis, or its analysis was again in dicta.
- Dissent: Justice Márquez writes a dissent and Justice Boatright joins.
- Holding: An initiative that repeals a constitutional provision with multiple subjects does not violate the constitution's single subject clause so long as it passes the standard single subject test:
  - 1. It effectuates one general objective or purpose;
  - 2. Does not treat incongruous subjects in the same measure;
  - 3. Comprises subject matter that is necessarily and properly connected;
  - 4. Contains nothing surreptitious or hidden; and
  - 5. Presents no risk of surprise or fraud on voters.

=== Romer v. Evans, 1996 ===
- In 1992, Colorado voters approved an amendment to the state constitution, Amendment 2, which forbade any political subdivision within Colorado from taking any action to recognize homosexuals as a protected class of people. In 1993, a trial court issued a permanent injunction against the amendment, and the Colorado Supreme Court agreed, noting the amendment subject to "strict scrutiny" under the Equal Protection Clause of the Fourteenth Amendment of the United States Constitution and remanded the case back to the trial court to find if it could withstand strict scrutiny. The trial court concluded it could not, and the Colorado Supreme Court once again agreed in a 2–1 decision. The case was appealed to the U.S. Supreme Court in Romer v. Evans (1996), which affirmed the Colorado Supreme Court in a 6–3 decision, though by applying rational basis review instead.

=== Colorado Ethics Watch v. Senate Majority Fund, LLC, 2012 ===
The issue here was whether two federally tax-exempt political organizations that did not include particular words in advertisements such as "vote for," "elect," "support," "vote against," "defeat," or "reject" and did not expressly argue for the election of a particular candidate were not required, under Article 28 of the Colorado Constitution, to register as "political committees" with the Colorado Secretary of State.

=== Hall v. Moreno, 2012 ===
The Colorado Supreme Court upheld a trial court ruling that adopted redistricting maps for the state's Congressional districts.

=== Colorado Oil and Gas Conservation Commission v. Grand Valley Citizen's Alliance, 2012 ===
This case involved the question whether the Colorado Oil and Gas Conservation Commission was required to hold a hearing on a citizen group's opposition to a drilling permit. The Colorado Supreme Court ruled that COGCC did not have to hold such a hearing.

=== Union of Taxpayers v. Aspen, 2016 ===
- Facts: In 2012, the City of Aspen implemented a $.20 fee per bag at grocery stores. The city wanted to reduce waste and encourage citizens to bring reusable bags.
- Issue: The issue was whether the levy was a tax or a fee under the law. A tax requires voter approval under the TABOR amendment in the Colorado constitution.
- Decision: The majority opinion was written by Chief Justice Rice. She and Justices Márquez, Gabriel, and Hart determined the amount was a fee because it was not levied to raise money for the city and had a specific purpose for the funds.
- Dissent: Justices Coats, Boatright, and Hood dissented.
- Holding: The 2016 decision upheld the unanimous decision by the Colorado Court of Appeals, Union of Taxpayers v. Aspen, 2015COA162.

=== Colorado Oil and Gas Conservation Commission v. Martinez, 2017 ===
- Facts: In 2013, the Respondents proposed a new rule to the Colorado Oil and Gas Conservation Commission. The rule required the commission to only grant new drilling if it would not impair the environment. The commission determined it did not have the statutory authority to grant such a rule. On review, the Denver District Court overruled the commission. The Court of Appeal's (Case 2016CA564) then over ruled the District Court and agreed with the Commission's decision.
- Issue: Did the Commission have the legal authority to approve the Respondent's proposed rule?
- Decision: In 2017, the unanimous opinion was written by Justice Gabriel. It found three reasons the Commission's decision should stand.
  - 1. The Court has a limited role in reviewing a decision by the Commission not to implement a new rule.
  - 2. The new rule would run counter to the authority given to the Commission by the State Legislature.
  - 3. The Commission was already working with another agency to fix the concerns raised by the Respondents.
- Holding: The Supreme Court upheld the Court of Appeals' decision, reversed the Denver District Court's decision, and upheld the decision of the Colorado Oil and Gas Conservation Commission.

=== Common-law same-sex marriage, 2021 ===
In January 2021, the Colorado Supreme Court made a ruling to retroactively recognize common-law same-sex marriage.

=== Anderson v. Griswold, 2023 ===
On December 19, 2023, in a 4–3 decision, the Colorado Supreme Court declared former president Donald Trump ineligible for the presidency under the U.S. Constitution's insurrection clause and removed him from the state's presidential primary ballot (which was eventually overturned by a 9-0 decision by the US Supreme Court). This marked the first time in history that Section 3 of the 14th Amendment has been used to disqualify a presidential candidate. A Colorado district court had previously ruled that the January 6 Capitol attack was an "insurrection" within the meaning of Section 3, and that Trump did "engage" in insurrection by inciting the attack (outside of the protections of the First Amendment), but that Section 3 did not apply to Trump because the President of the United States is not an Officer of the United States and thus Trump had not "previously taken an oath ... as an officer of the United States," as required by Section 3.

After Supreme Court justices received significant violent threats from angry Trump supporters, the FBI was brought in to investigate. Further, Trump's lawyer, Jesse Binnall, hinted that these, and other, judges would be subject to prosecution by a "real" Department of Justice in a future Trump administration.

=== Miller v. Crested Butte, LLC, 2024 ===
In this case the court ruled that ski resorts cannot obtain a complete waiver from all negligence liability if they include a waiver in a ski pass purchased by consumers.

=== League of Women Voters of Greeley v. Board of County Commissioners of the County of Weld, 2025 ===
In this case the court ruled that Weld County was required to comply with state statutes that govern redistricting of county commissioner districts and that home rule status as a county provides no exemption from that obligation.

=== County Commissioners of Boulder County and City of Boulder v. Suncor Energy USA, Inc. et al., 2025 ===
In this case the court held that state tort law claims against oil companies arising out of damages caused by climate change are not preempted by federal law.

=== In re Parental Responsibilities Concerning K.M.S., 2025 ===
The Colorado Supreme Court held here that the parents of a birth parent spouse do not qualify as "grandparents" entitled to visitation rights involving an adopted child.

== See also ==
- List of justices of the Colorado Supreme Court
- Bibliography of Colorado
- Geography of Colorado
- History of Colorado
- Index of Colorado-related articles
- List of Colorado-related lists
- Outline of Colorado
