= Henry J. Hendrix =

United States Navy captain (born 1966)

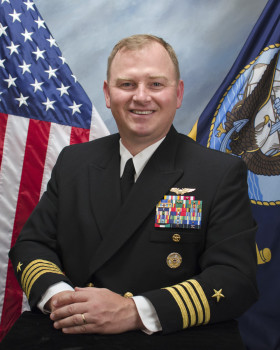
- Born: 1966 (age 59–60); Angola, Indiana
- Military career
- Branch: U.S. Navy
- Service years: 1988-2014
- Rank: Captain (O-6)
- Units: Served as Director of the Naval History and Heritage Command; Previous Assignments: Patrol Squadron TEN; USS Theodore Roosevelt (CVN 71); Staff of the Chief of Naval Operations; Staff of the Under Secretary of Defense; Director of the Secretary of the Navy's Advisory Panel
- Website: www.history.navy.mil

Henry J. Hendrix (born 1966) is a retired United States Navy captain. He has served as an American defense analyst, an official historian and curator of the Navy and an author. His written work has focused on the composition of the United States Navy force, the structure of the Navy, the role of the aircraft carrier in modern strategic environments and the structure of the carrier air wing. He also publicly supported U.S. President Donald Trump's plan to build a 350-ship Navy.

Hendrix served as a senior military assistant to Andrew Marshall.

== Education ==
After Hendrix graduated from Purdue University in 1988 with a bachelor's degree in political science, he earned a master's degrees in national security affairs from the Naval Postgraduate School and history from Harvard University. He later earned a PhD in war studies from King's College.

== Naval career ==
Hendrix joined the United States Navy in 1988 as a commissioned officer. A year later, he completed flight training to become a naval flight officer and was stationed with VP-10 (Patrol Squadron 10). In 1994, he joined the USS Theodore Roosevelt as a tactical action officer and was deployed to the Mediterranean and Persian Gulf. In 1997 Hendrix served as Fleet Training Officer for VP-30 (Patrol Squadron 30). He then took command of Tactical Air Control Squadron 11 and was deployed again to the Gulf.

As a staff officer, Hendrix worked on the Chief of Naval Operations executive panel on homeland defense, naval aviation, and naval missile defense. He also served as the Executive Secretary for the Irregular Warfare Quadrennial Defense Review at the Office of the Undersecretary of Defense for Policy. He worked as an assistant to Andrew Marshall in the Office of Net Assessment, advising on future developments in military technology, He was later named director of the Secretary of the Navy's advisory panel.

At the time of his retirement in 2014, Hendrix was the director of the Naval History and Heritage Command and the official curator of the Navy, responsible for the Navy's museums, arts and artifact collections, document archives and for collecting U.S. Naval history worldwide.

== Post-Military Career ==
After retirement from the Navy, Hendrix worked at the Center for a New American Security, where he was a senior fellow and director of the defense program. He testified before the United States Senate Armed Services Subcommittee on Seapower about strategies for achieving U.S. President Donald Trump's plan for a 350-ship Navy.

He is currently the vice president of the Telemus Group, a security consultancy specializing in defense forecasting, wargaming and qualitative analysis.

Hendrix contributed to publications and media outlets including the National Review, Foreign Policy, the National Interest, Fox News, the New York Observer, the Japan Times, Politico, as well as a number of national defense websites. He collaborated with Robert C. O'Brien, who served as a United States National Security Advisor, on a foreign policy article analyzing how President Trump's goal for restoring the U.S. Navy ship force could be achieved. In 2018 he co-authored an essay with Senator Roger Wicker examining the central role of naval forces in U.S. foreign policy.

In 2020 Hendrix published a short treatise on naval strategy “To Provide and Maintain a Navy: Why Naval Primacy is America’s First, Best Strategy” that made historical as well as philosophical arguments for growing the American fleet and changing its internal force mix.

In the past he has taken a critical position on aircraft carriers due to what he sees as a high expense and questionable survivability in modern strategic environments. He proposes modifying the structure of the carrier air wing to include more unmanned aerial vehicles, which he believes essential to countering modern threats.

Hendrix is known for supporting an increase in the number and capabilities of strategic bombers under the theory that a large and effective fleet of bombers has historically reduced the total length of wars, can force rivals to invest in air defenses and can also act as a powerful deterrent.

His support for this policy is in part derived from his work on Theodore Roosevelt's use of naval power as a tool for diplomacy, which points to the conclusion that Roosevelt's naval strategy laid the foundation for establishing the United States as a great world power. He is a proponent of Roosevelt's Big Stick diplomacy, and views a larger Navy and strategic bombers as the means to carry on this tradition in the 21st century.

== Published works ==
=== Selected articles, reviews, and commentary ===
- An Extraordinary Thing in a Routine Way, Foundation Journal, Fall 1999
- Fulcrum of Greatness, in Naval History Magazine, Naval Institute Press, December, 2002
- One Hundred Years Ago,: T.R.. Averts Crises, in Proceedings, Naval Institute Press, December, 2002
- Exploit Sea Basing, in Proceedings, Naval Institute Press, Aug, 2003
- T.R.'s Virtuoso Performance in American History Magazine, Primedia Press, Feb. 2004
- Active-Reserve Integration or Bust with CDR D.D. Centanni in Proceedings, Naval Institute Press, Dec, 2004
- Drain the Entire Swamp, in Proceedings, Naval Institute Press, April, 2005
- An Unlikely Location, in Naval History Magazine, Naval Institute Press, Aug, 2005
- Control of the Sea Protects the New Global Heartland, in Proceedings, Naval Institute Press, April, 2006
- TR's Plan to Invade Colombia, in Naval History Magazine, Naval Institute Press, Dec. 2006
- Carried Away, in Armed Forces Journal, Defense News Media Group, Mar. 2008
- Buy Ford, Not Ferrari, in Proceedings, Naval Institute Press, April 2009
- More Henderson, Less Bonds, in Proceedings, Naval Institute Press, April, 2010
- An Influential 'Shaping' Navy, in Proceedings, Naval Institute Press, Feb., 2011
- Twilight of the $uperfluous Carrier, in Proceedings, Naval Institute Press, May, 2011
- Hendrix, Henry J. (March 2013). At What Cost A Carrier? (PDF). Disruptive Defense Papers. Center for New American Security. Archived from the original (PDF) on 13 August 2014.
- in The National Interest, April 2018
- To Provide and Maintain a Navy: Why Naval Primacy Is America's First, Best Strategy” Focsle Press, Annapolis, 2020
