= James H. Baker =

James H. Baker may refer to:

- James H. Baker (politician) (1829–1913), politician who was Ohio Secretary of State and Minnesota Secretary of State
- James H. Baker (DOD), American foreign policy advisor
- James Baker (university president) (1848–1914), president of the University of Colorado
