= Suzanne Malveaux =

American journalist (born 1966)

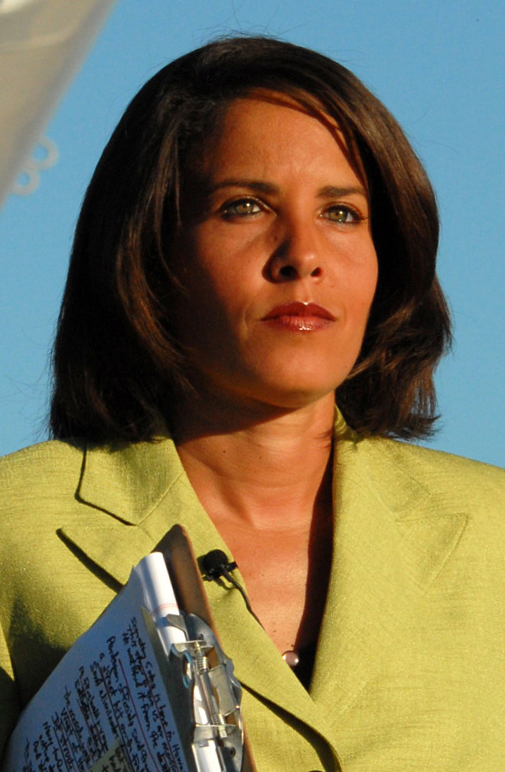
- Malveaux in 2008
- Born: Suzanne Maria Malveaux; December 4, 1966 (age 59); Lansing, Michigan, U.S.
- Education: Harvard University (BA); Columbia University (MA)
- Partner: Karine Jean-Pierre (2012–2023)
- Children: 1
- Relatives: Suzette M. Malveaux (sister); Julianne Malveaux (cousin); Gizelle Bryant (cousin)

Suzanne Maria Malveaux (/suːˈzɑːn mɑːlˈvoʊ/; born December 4, 1966) is an American broadcast journalist. After joining CNN from NBC News in 2002, she co-anchored the CNN international news program Around the World and editions of CNN Newsroom and also served as the network's White House correspondent and as primary substitute to Wolf Blitzer on The Situation Room. She departed the network in 2023.

== Early life and education ==
Malveaux was born in Lansing, Michigan, into a New Orleans–based family, with parents both of Louisiana Creole origin: their roots are of French, Spanish, Native American, and African descent. Malveaux has stated that different members of her family identify as white, biracial, and/or black, and that she considers herself black. Her father, Floyd Joseph Malveaux, was a doctor who became the dean of the College of Medicine at Howard University; he was the executive director of the Merck Childhood Asthma Network and a founder of Howard University's National Human Genome Center. Her mother, the former Myrna Maria Ruiz, is a retired schoolteacher. In an episode of Finding Your Roots, it was revealed to Malveaux that her French roots trace back to a 17th-century French-Canadian fur trader from Quebec, that a seventh-great-grandmother on her father's side (the fur trader's wife) was a Native American of the Kaskaskia tribe, and that one of her ancestors in Louisiana was a free black man who himself owned slaves.

Malveaux graduated from Centennial High School in Ellicott City, Maryland, in 1984, then Harvard College with a B.A. degree cum laude in sociology, writing a senior thesis based on a semester she spent at Howard University. She graduated with a master's degree in broadcasting from the Columbia University Graduate School of Journalism in 1991. Malveaux is an honorary member of Alpha Kappa Alpha sorority.

== Career ==
Malveaux's first television job was with New England Cable News as a general assignment reporter in Boston, from 1992 to 1996. She then moved to Washington, D.C., and worked for NBC affiliate WRC-TV from 1996 to 1999 as a self-described "rock-and-roll" reporter reporting local and crime news.

In 1999, Meet the Press host Tim Russert recruited Malveaux to join NBC News. She reported for three years in Washington, including as a Pentagon correspondent, then in Chicago. She covered national stories such as Bill Clinton's impeachment, Elián González, the Kosovo War, the 2000 presidential election, the 9/11 attacks, and the 2001 war in Afghanistan.

In August 2007, Malveaux was the moderator of the 31st annual convention of the National Association of Black Journalists. She had served on various panels at previous conventions of the NABJ, of which she is a member.

In advance of the Democratic and Republican national conventions, Malveaux anchored a 90-minute documentary on Senator Barack Obama as part of a two-part series on the 2008 general election presidential candidates. Additionally, she served as a panelist questioning the candidates in the Democratic presidential primary debate in South Carolina sponsored by CNN and the Congressional Black Caucus in January 2008. She also played a key role in CNN's 2004 election coverage and its Emmy Award-winning 2006 election coverage.

Malveaux later augmented her White House reporting by serving as the primary substitute anchor for The Situation Room with Wolf Blitzer, a two-hour-long program that airs every weekday on CNN hosted by Wolf Blitzer. In 2011, she was named dayside anchor of CNN Newsroom. In 2012, she became host of Aspire's eight-part series, "The Root 100".

In 2014, Malveaux show Around the World was cancelled and she returned to Washington, D.C., to better care for her mother, who had ALS. Malveaux left CNN in January 2023 for her family.

=== Interviews and presidential-related travel ===
As White House correspondent, Malveaux has interviewed former presidents George H. W. Bush, Bill Clinton, and George W. Bush, as well as former first lady Laura Bush. Her coverage of presidential trips overseas has taken her to Europe, the Balkans, Southeast Asia, Africa, Australia, Latin America, and the Middle East. In 2022, Malveaux traveled to Ukraine, then under attack by Russia, to report for CNN from Lviv.

== Personal life ==
Malveaux has three siblings, one of whom is an identical twin, Suzette M. Malveaux, a professor at the University of Colorado Law School until 2024. Columnist and former Bennett College president Julianne Malveaux is a distant cousin. She is also a cousin to Gizelle Bryant, star on the reality TV show Real Housewives of Potomac.

Her family lived in New Orleans and later Howard County, Maryland, and she attended Centennial High School in Ellicott City, Maryland.

Malveaux was in a relationship with former White House Press Secretary Karine Jean-Pierre from 2012 until September 2023. They share an adopted daughter.
