= Michael Pillsbury =

American strategist and expert on China (born 1945)

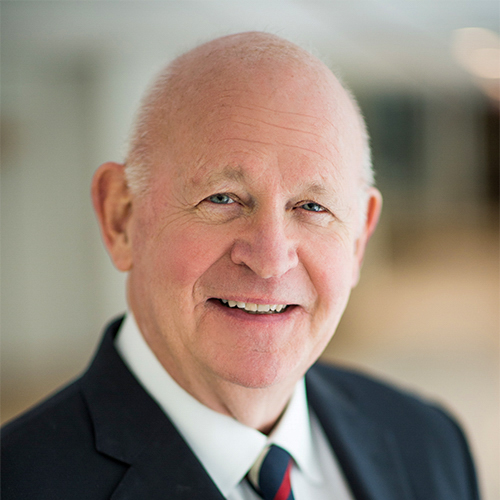
- Born: Michael Paul Pillsbury; February 8, 1945 (age 81); California, US
- Education: Stanford University (BA); Columbia University (PhD)
- Occupations: Foreign policy strategist, government official, author
- Years active: 1978–present
- Known for: Grand strategy, Chinese studies
- Political party: Republican

Chinese name
- Chinese: 白邦瑞
Transcriptions
Standard Mandarin
- Hanyu Pinyin: Bái Bāngruì

Michael Paul Pillsbury (born February 8, 1945) is an American foreign policy strategist, author, and former public official in the United States. He was appointed in December 2020 to be the chair of the Defense Policy Board at the U.S. Department of Defense. He is also a senior fellow for China strategy at The Heritage Foundation and has been director of the Center on Chinese Strategy at the Hudson Institute in Washington, D.C., since 2014. Before Hudson, he held various postings in the U.S. Department of Defense and U.S. Senate. He has been called a "China-hawk", and an "architect" of Trump's policy towards China. In 2018, he was described by Donald Trump as the leading authority on the country.

Pillsbury is the author of three books on Chinese grand strategy. Pillsbury's most recent book, The Hundred-Year Marathon, appeared as a selection of the 2017 U.S. Special Operations Command, Commanders Reading List, and was number one on The Washington Post bestsellers list. According to The New York Times, Pillsbury's book "has become a lodestar for those in the West Wing pushing for a more forceful response to the threat that China's rise poses to the United States."

== Career ==
Pillsbury received his B.A. in history from Stanford University (where he was mentored by East Asia specialist Mark Mancall) before earning a Ph.D. in Chinese studies (under the aegis of Zbigniew Brzezinski and Michel Oksenberg) from Columbia University. He is fluent in Mandarin Chinese and makes regular visits to China.

He was an assistant political affairs officer at the United Nations from 1969 to 1970. From 1971 to 1972, he completed a National Science Foundation doctoral dissertation fellowship in Taiwan, where he spent time studying at National Taiwan University.

While employed as a social science analyst at the RAND Corporation from 1973 to 1977, he published articles in Foreign Policy and International Security recommending that the United States establish intelligence and military ties with China. The proposal, publicly commended by Ronald Reagan, Henry Kissinger, and James Schlesinger, later became US policy during the Carter and Reagan administrations. He served in the Reagan administration as Assistant Under Secretary of Defense for Policy Planning and was responsible for implementation of the program of covert aid known as the Reagan Doctrine.

Pillsbury served on the staff of four United States Senate Committees from 1978 to 1984 and 1986–1991. As a staff member, Pillsbury drafted the Senate Labor Committee version of the legislation that enacted the US Institute of Peace in 1984. He also assisted in drafting the legislation to create the National Endowment for Democracy and the annual requirement for a DOD report on Chinese military power.

In 1992, under President George H. W. Bush, Pillsbury was special assistant for Asian affairs in the Office of the Secretary of Defense, reporting to Andrew W. Marshall, director of the Office of Net Assessment. Pillsbury is a lifetime member of the Council on Foreign Relations and member of the International Institute for Strategic Studies.

In 2015, a former Central Intelligence Agency director revealed that a book called The Hundred-Year Marathon "is based on work Michael Pillsbury did that landed him the CIA Director's Exceptional Performance Award." The official website has declassified documents and photos that illustrate the book.

Pillsbury's scholarship has been questioned by the center-left Washington Monthly assistant editor Soyoung Ho, in his article "Panda Slugger, the dubious scholarship of Michael Pillsbury, the China hawk with Rumsfeld's ear", published in the July/August issue in 2006.

Pillsbury's work has not been siloed to the American right, finding bipartisan interest as many Democrats look to continue his work in incorporating a version of Trump's China doctrine in the Biden Administration.

Pillsbury is an alumnus of the Belfer Center for Science and International Affairs at the Harvard Kennedy School, where in 1978 he served as a research fellow in Chinese politics and strategy.

Pillsbury played a role in three Presidential actions:

=== US–China military and intelligence ties ===
According to three books, Pillsbury participated in President Jimmy Carter's decision in 1979–80, as modified by President Reagan in 1981, to initiate military and intelligence ties with China.

According to Raymond L. Garthoff, "Michael Pillsbury first floated the idea of arms sales and broad range of American military security relationships with China in a much-discussed article in Foreign Policy in the fall of 1975. Not known then was that Pillsbury had been conducting secret talks with Chinese officials … his reports were circulated to a dozen or so top officials of the NSC, Department of Defense and Department of State as secret documents." According to the book US–China Cold War Collaboration, 1971–1989, "The man spearheading the effort was not a public official, and enjoyed deniability. Michael Pillsbury, a China analyst at the RAND Corporation… spent the summer of 1973 secretly meeting PLA officers stationed under diplomatic cover at China's UN mission… The DoD managed Pillsbury. Pillsbury filed a report, L-32, in March 1974… L-32 was a seminal paper on which subsequent US-PRC military cooperation blossomed." James Mann wrote, "Outward appearances indicate that Pillsbury may have been working with American intelligence agencies from the very start of his relationship with General Zhang… In the fall of 1973, Pillsbury submitted a classified memo suggesting the novel idea that the United States might establish a military relationship with China… This was the genesis of the ideas of a 'China card,' the notion that the United States might use China to gain Cold War advantage over the Soviet Union. The idea would eventually come to dominate American thinking about the new relationship with China."

=== Arming the Mujahedeen with Stinger missiles ===
Pillsbury participated in President Reagan's decision in 1986 to order the CIA to arm the Afghan resistance with Stinger missiles. According to the UN Undersecretary General who negotiated the Soviet withdrawal from Afghanistan, "Initially, the Stinger campaign was spearheaded by Undersecretary of Defense for Policy Fred Ikle and his aggressive Coordinator for Afghan Affairs, Michael Pillsbury… The Stinger proponents won their victory in the face of overwhelming bureaucratic resistance that persisted until the very end of the struggle." Mann wrote, "For Michael Pillsbury, the covert operations in Afghanistan represented the fulfillment of the decade-old dream of American military cooperation with China… To help him win the argument, Pillsbury made use of his China connections." George Crile stated in Charlie Wilson's War that, "Ironically, neither [Gust] Avrakotos nor [Charlie] Wilson was directly involved in the decision and claims any credit."

Harvard University's Harvard Kennedy School published what it called the first case study of how covert action policy is made and describes the role of Michael Pillsbury. According to Charlie Wilson's War, "The moving force in this group was an engaging, well-born conservative intellectual named Mike Pillsbury, then serving as the Pentagon's deputy undersecretary in charge of overseeing covert programs. Pillsbury, a former Senate staffer and China expert, had been an early believer in the program…" According to Philip Heymann in his 2008 book Living the Policy Process, "A policy player such as Michael Pillsbury may have absorbed many of the critical rules of the game of shared policy choice without even thinking of them as rules."

Heymann wrote that "providing Stinger missiles was obviously of such importance or political prominence that the President would want to decide. This decision is obviously of that character for several reasons. If approved, we may be furnishing a terrifying weapon to a present or future enemy. There is a small chance that we will encourage dangerous forms of retaliation by the Soviet Union. Even the shift from a "plausibly deniable" covert action to the open support of a guerrilla force fighting the Soviet Union would raise issues in Congress that the President would want to consider in light of his staff's advice." Pillsbury worked through the secret Planning and Coordination Group. Heymann wrote, "This committee was secret, and public details about it are sketchy… The covert action committee met every three to four weeks. Its existence was not officially acknowledged, although such a committee had operated in every administration since Eisenhower. In the Kennedy administration, for example, it was known as the Forty Committee. Any information on covert actions was protected under a compartmentalized security system given the name VEIL."

=== Studies of China and the Pentagon's annual report ===
In 1997–2007, Pillsbury published research reports and two books on China's view of future warfare. According to the Wall Street Journal in 2005, Pillsbury's findings were added to the reports the secretary of defense sent to Congress on Chinese military power in 2002–2005. In 2003, Pillsbury signed a non-partisan report of the Council on Foreign Relations task force on Chinese military power. The task force found that China is pursuing a deliberate course of military modernization, but is at least two decades behind the United States in terms of military technology and capability. The task force report stated it was a "non-partisan approach to measuring the development of Chinese military power." He has discussed the threat the People's Republic of China poses to the United States of America with Tucker Carlson. In December 2020, the Trump administration announced it intended to appoint him as the chair of the Defense Policy Board.

=== Chinese perceptions of the Soviet–American military balance ===
In December 1979, Michael Pillsbury completed a study for the Department of Defense on how Chinese leaders perceived the U.S.–Soviet strategic balance. The report, later declassified, emphasized the role of psychology and cultural tradition in Chinese deterrence theory. The study was summarized in the official Foreign Relations of the United States (FRUS) series, 1977–1980, Vol. XIII (China), Document 284.

Key Quotations (pp. 26–43 of SPC-534)

“The Chinese conception of deterrence emphasizes the ability to affect the opponent’s perceptions and emotions, rather than to calculate mathematically the military balance. The Chinese often imply that human beings act more like animals in response to fear, threat, and intimidation, than like rational calculators of risks and benefits.”

“Chinese writings about the international system are replete with animal imagery. The Soviet Union is described as a wolf or bear, the United States as a tiger—sometimes a paper tiger—while smaller states are sheep or fish. These metaphors are not rhetorical flourishes; they appear to constitute a model of human and state behavior in which instinct, emotion, and dominance relationships prevail.”

“Unlike most Western analysts, the Chinese repeatedly assert that nuclear war is survivable. China’s vast territory, dispersed population, and revolutionary spirit are cited as guarantees of national survival. This contrasts with the Western obsession with mutual assured destruction.”

“Chinese assessments stress that both the United States and the Soviet Union seek superiority, yet neither can achieve it. A stable balance of power is impossible. The arms race is inevitable, uncontrollable, and driven particularly by the hegemonist nature of the Soviet Union.”

“Chinese leaders continue to emphasize that U.S. demonstrations of firmness against Soviet pressure enhance their confidence, while American vacillation or weakness evokes warnings of global disaster. For Beijing, the question is not numbers of weapons but the appearance of determination.”

== Government positions ==
- Chair of the Defense Policy Board at U.S. Department of Defense 2020
- Consultant at U.S. Department of Defense 2004–present
- Senior research advisor at US-China Economic and Security Review Commission 2003–2004
- Policy Advisory Group at United States Department of Defense 2001–2003
- Visiting research fellow at National Defense University, 1997–2000
- Special Government employee at US Department of Defense (Defense Science Board) 1998–2000
- Research consultant at US Agency for International Development 1991–1995
- Special assistant to director of the Office of Net Assessment Andrew Marshall 1992–1993
- Congressional Afghan Task Force Senate Staff coordinator at US Senate 1986–1990
- Assistant under secretary for policy planning at US Department of Defense 1984–1986
- Professional staff at US Senate 1978–1981
- Acting director, Arms Control and Disarmament Agency at US Department of State 1981

== Affiliations ==
- Aided Bank of Credit and Commerce International in avoiding bad publicity in the US Senate after BCCI pleaded guilty to laundering billions of dollars in "drug money laundering, arms trafficking and support of terrorists"
- Director of the Center on Chinese Strategy, Hudson Institute, 1201 Pennsylvania Ave, Washington DC, 2014–present
- Senior fellow for China Strategy, The Heritage Foundation, Washington, D.C., 2023–present
- Member of the board of directors, Freedom House, Washington, D.C., 2016–present
- Member of the advisory council, Woodrow Wilson International Center for Scholars, Washington, D.C.
- National Geographic Society, member of council of advisors and founding co-chairman of the Explorers Society, 2012-2014
- Eagle Donor to Republican National Committee, with reported donatation of over $100,000 since 2008
- Member, Republican Governors Association, Executive Roundtable, 2014–present
- Member of Washington, D.C. Republican GOP Advisory Council, 2012–present
- Author of number one national bestseller, The Hundred-year Marathon, also published in Korean, Japanese, Taiwan-Chinese and PRC-Chinese edition published by Chinese National Defense University, and published in Hindi and Mongolian; selected as "one of the 10 best books of the year" by The Christian Science Monitor,
- Member of the board of directors, French American Cultural Foundation, 1430 New York Ave, Washington, DC, 2015–present

== Published works ==
=== Books ===
Author of two books on China, available at National Defense University Press:

- Pillsbury, Michael (2015). The Hundred-Year Marathon: China's Secret Strategy to Replace America as the Global Superpower. Henry Holt and Company. ISBN 978-1-6277-9010-9.
- Pillsbury, Michael (2000). China Debates the Future Security Environment. University Press of the Pacific. ISBN 978-1-4102-1856-8. Archived from the original on 2009-06-25.
  This book has been translated and published in China by the New China News Agency Press
- Pillsbury, Michael (1998). Chinese Views of Future Warfare. National Defense University Press. ISBN 978-1-57906-016-9. Archived from the original on 2009-07-09. (editor)

=== Reports and articles ===
==== US China Commission Congressional Reports ====
- "China's Progress in Technological Competitiveness – The Need for a New Assessment" (PDF). 2005. Archived from the original (PDF) on 2009-05-07.
- "The US Role in Taiwan's Defense Reforms". 2004. Archived from the original on 2009-06-25.
- "China's Military Strategy Toward the U.S.: A View From Open Sources" (PDF). 2003. Archived from the original (PDF) on 2006-11-14.
- "An Assessment of China's Anti-Satellite And Space Warfare Programs, Policies And Doctrines" (PDF). Defense Technical Information Center. January 19, 2007. OCLC 165065634. Archived from the original on July 9, 2009.
- China's Assessment of the Future Security Environment. Office of Net Assessment. 1998. OCLC 43387159.
- Dangerous Chinese Misperceptions: The Implications for the Department of Defense. Office of Net Assessment. 1996. OCLC 53477900.
- Chinese Perceptions of the Soviet-American Military Balance. Office of Net Assessment. 1980. OCLC 6368991.

==== House and Senate testimonies ====
- "Testimony to House Armed Services Committee". June 21, 2000.
- "Testimony Before the United States Senate Select Committee on Intelligence". November 1997.

==== Journal articles ====
- Pillsbury, Michael (1980). "Strategic Acupuncture". Foreign Policy (Winter 1980): 44–61. doi:10.2307/1148172. JSTOR 1148172.
- Pillsbury, Michael (1975). "US-China Military Ties?". Foreign Policy (Autumn 1975): 50–64. doi:10.2307/1148126. JSTOR 1148126.
- Pillsbury, Michael (1978). "A Japanese Card?". Foreign Policy (Winter 1978): 3–30. doi:10.2307/1148458. JSTOR 1148458.
- Pillsbury, Michael P (1977). "Future Sino American Security Ties: The View from Tokyo, Moscow, and Peking". International Security. 1 (Spring 1977): 124–142. doi:10.2307/2538627. JSTOR 2538627. S2CID 153879407.

==== RAND Corporation reports ====
Some of these are available online:

- Personal Ties and Factionalism in Peking. RAND Corporation. 1975. OCLC 1575577.
- Taiwan's fate: Two Chinas But Not Forever. RAND Corporation. 1975. OCLC 1575589.
- The Political Environment on Taiwan. RAND Corporation. 1975. OCLC 1462258.
- SALT on the Dragon: Chinese Views of the Soviet-American Strategic Balance. RAND Corporation. 1975. OCLC 2218652.
- Soviet Apprehensions about Sino-American Relations, 1971–74. RAND Corporation. 1975. OCLC 1549446.
- Statement to the Subcommittee on Future Foreign Policy Research and Development, Committee on International Relations, House of Representatives. RAND Corporation. 1976. OCLC 2731888.
- Chinese Foreign Policy: Three New Studies. RAND Corporation. 1975. OCLC 2379124.

==== Other reports ====
- Carafano, James Jay; Pillsbury, Michael; Smith, Jeff M.; Harding, Andrew. Winning the New Cold War: A Plan for Countering China. The Heritage Foundation. 2023.
- Pillsbury has collaborated to Project 2025; he is thanked for his contribution to Chapter 6: "Department of State".

== Video interviews ==
- Fox News: Trump will have an ‘enormous’ impact on the way the US approaches China, expert says, Nov 17, 2024
- Fox Business: Dr. Michael Pillsbury weighs in on US relations with China: Trump is looking for stability, Sept 10, 2024
- Fox News: It is ‘very clear’ that China thinks Trump will win in 2024: Michael Pillsbury, Apr 7, 2024
- Fox News: Michael Pillsbury warns China has placed ‘Trojan horses’ in US infrastructure, Feb 3, 2024
- CNN: Pillsbury: What U.S. can learn from China, Jan 6, 2019
- Fox News: China Walks Away from Trade Talks with the U.S. , Sept 22, 2018
- Fox Business: Mounting Pessimism Over Quick Resolution to U.S.-China Trade Tensions? , Sept 10, 2018
- CNBC: We Need to Narrow Our List of China Trade Demands , Aug 20, 2018
- U.S. House Intelligence Committee: Michael Pillsbury Testifies before U.S. House Intelligence Committee Mounting Pessimism Over Quick Resolution to U.S.-China Trade Tensions? , Jul 19, 2018
