= Committee of Ten =

1892 US education working group

The National Education Association of the United States Committee on Secondary School Studies known as the NEA Committee of Ten was a working group of educators that convened in 1892. They were charged with taking stock of current practices in American high schools and making recommendations for future practice. They collected data via surveys and interviews with educators across the United States, met in a series of multi-day committee meetings, and developed consensus and dissenting reports.

== Background ==
Education is a matter left up to individual states and territories in the United States. This meant that each state developed its own system, including its own structure for secondary education, or high school. These disparate systems often led to a disconnect between high schools in the same state or large gaps between the skills students had when they left high school and what colleges were looking for. The rise of the common school helped even out differences in different states grammar schools but by the late 1800s, a desire for educational standardization had manifested across the country. Across the nation and within communities, there were competing academic philosophies which the Committee of Ten aimed to resolve. One philosophy favored rote memorization, whereas another favored critical thinking. One philosophy designated American high schools as institutions that would divide students into college-bound and working-trades groups from the start; these institutions sometimes further divided students based on race or ethnic background. Another philosophy attempted to provide standardized courses for all students. Somewhat similarly, another philosophy promoted classic Latin/Greek studies, whereas other philosophies stressed practical studies.

== Membership of the Committee of Ten ==
To resolve these issues, the National Education Association formed The 1892 Committee of Ten. The committee was largely composed of representatives of higher education. Its subgroups, consisting of eight to ten members each, were convened by the following individuals:

- Charles William Eliot, President of Harvard University, Cambridge, Massachusetts Chairman
- William T. Harris, Commissioner of Education, Washington, D.C.
- James B. Angell, President of the University of Michigan, Ann Arbor, Michigan
- John Tetlow, Head Master of the Girls’ High School, Boston, Massachusetts
- James Monroe Taylor, President of Vassar College, Poughkeepsie, New York
- Oscar D. Robinson, Principal of the High School, Albany, New York
- James H. Baker, President of the University of Colorado, Boulder, Colorado
- Richard Henry Jesse, President of the University of Missouri, Columbia, Missouri
- James C. Mackenzie, Head Master of the Lawrenceville School, Lawrenceville, New Jersey
- Henry Churchill King, Professor in Oberlin College, Oberlin, Ohio

== Recommendations ==
External videos
- You can view Coursera's summary on the Committee of Ten on YouTube

The committee provided its recommendations in a report published in 1894 that answered an initial set of eleven questions, and outlined important curricular knowledge within each major instructional specialty including Latin, Greek, English, "Other Modern Languages", mathematics, and the sciences (physics, chemistry, and astronomy).

Twelve years of education were recommended, with eight years of elementary education followed by four years of high school. The committee was explicitly asked to address tracking, or course differentiation based upon postsecondary pursuit. The committee responded unanimously that "...every subject which is taught at all in a secondary school should be taught in the same way and to the same extent to every pupil so long as he pursues it, no matter what the probable destination of the pupil may be, or at what point his education is to cease." In addition to promoting equality in instruction, they stated that by unifying courses of study, school instruction and the training of new teachers could be greatly simplified.

These recommendations were generally interpreted as a call to teach English, mathematics, and history or civics to every student every academic year in high school. The recommendations also formed the basis of the practice of teaching chemistry, and physics, respectively, in ascending high school academic years.

The Committee identified the need for more highly qualified educators, and proposed that universities could enhance training by offering subject-education courses, lowering tuition and paying travel fees for classroom teachers and that superintendents, principals or other "leading teachers" could show other teachers, "... by precept and example, how to [teach] better".

== See also ==
- 21st century skills
- Flexner Report
- Committee of Seven, American Historical Association, 1896-1898
