= Todd Saliman =

American politician

24th President of the University of Colorado
- Incumbent
- Assumed office July 1, 2021
- Preceded by: Mark Kennedy

Member of the Colorado House of Representatives from the 11th district
- In office January 11, 1995 – January 8, 2003
- Preceded by: Ruth Wright
- Succeeded by: Jack Pommer

Personal details
- Born: September 9, 1966 (age 59) Denver, Colorado
- Party: Democratic

Todd Saliman (born September 9, 1966) is an American politician who served in the Colorado House of Representatives from the 11th district from 1995 to 2003. He has served as the 24th President of the University of Colorado since 2021.
