= David Yost (disambiguation) =

David Yost or Dave Yost may refer to:

- David Yost (born 1969), American actor
- David S. Yost (born 1948), American academic
- Dave Yost (born 1956), American lawyer and politician
- David Yost (American football), college football coach
