= Energy and Environmental Security Initiative =

Energy & Environmental Security Initiative (EESI)
- Type: Research & Policy Institute
- Established: 2003
- Affiliations: University of Colorado Law School, University of Colorado at Boulder
- Dean: David Getches, Dean and Raphael Moses Professor of Law until 2011
- Director: Dr. Lakshman Guruswamy, Nicholas Doman Professor of Law
- Location: Boulder, Colorado, United States
- Website: http://www.colorado.edu/law/eesi

Established in 2003, the Energy and Environmental Security Initiative (EESI) is an interdisciplinary Research & Policy Institute located at the University of Colorado Law School. The fundamental mission of EESI is to serve as an interdisciplinary research and policy center concerning the development and crafting of State policies, U.S. energy policies, and global responses to the world's energy crisis; and to facilitate the attainment of a global sustainable energy future through the innovative use of laws, policies and technology solutions. In pursuit of this mission, EESI's primary operational function is that of an enabling environment for teaching, research and policy analysis vis-à-vis the impact of laws and policies on the scientific, technological, sociopolitical, commercial, and environmental dimensions of sustainable energy.

== Select energy and climate database projects ==
=== International Sustainable Energy Assessment (ISEA) ===
ISEA is a comprehensive global database of international treaties dealing with, or relevant to, the following energy categories, inter alia: conventional sources of energy such as oil, natural gas, and coal; renewable energy, such as wind, biomass, solar, geothermal, and hydro; energy efficiency and energy conservation; nuclear power; carbon capture and sequestration; and transportation. ISEA

=== International Project on Energy Commitments and Compliance (IPECC) ===
IPECC is designed to improve and enhance the efforts of governments, non-governmental actors—such as corporations, non-governmental organizations, trade unions, churches—and key decision-makers throughout the world in two ways: First by evaluating the extent to which their existing commitments and pledges are actually working; and second, by facilitating new and better clean and affordable energy solutions. IPECC will provide the information needed to improve the effectiveness of existing commitments and encourage new commitments where necessary. It is designed to track and monitor the implementation of sustainable energy commitments undertaken by governments, corporations and other entities, and to provide detailed information on the extent to which they are being complied with. In doing so it will serve as a watchdog over what is and should be happening with respect to these instruments and the commitments they embody. IPECC

=== The EESI Climate Action Database (CAD) ===
CAD contains U.S. policy proposals directed at climate change. CAD Primary document types contained in CAD include:

- Proposed Federal Legislation. Federal Legislative proposals (i.e., bills actually introduced) for climate stabilization and related energy security and national security actions to be undertaken by the U.S. President, executive administrative entities, or the U.S Congress.
- Proposals. Non-legislative proposals for climate stabilization and related energy security and national security actions to be undertaken by the U.S. President, executive administrative entities, or the U.S Congress.
- Impact Analyses. Documents that seek to ascertain the environmental, fiscal and/or carbon impacts of proposed actions.
- California and the Regional Greenhouse Gas Initiative (RGGI). With respect to California, CAD contains select documents potentially applicable to the federal context. Additionally, CAD contains documents related to RGGI to that may be applicable the federal context.

Excluded from CAD proposals are documents that: (1) are older than two years old (defined as generated prior to January 1, 2005), with certain exceptions; (2) are directed at international activities or policies, unless such activities or policies are to be implemented by the President or executive administrative entities; (3) are directed at a U.S. state other than California, or a regional collaboration other than RGGI; (4) that deal with management of the federal transportation fleet or federal buildings. CAD is not, at present, a living database—meaning that it is not intended to offer an up-to-the moment repository for U.S. federal climate proposals. The material contained in CAD is generally current through February 2007.

== Location ==
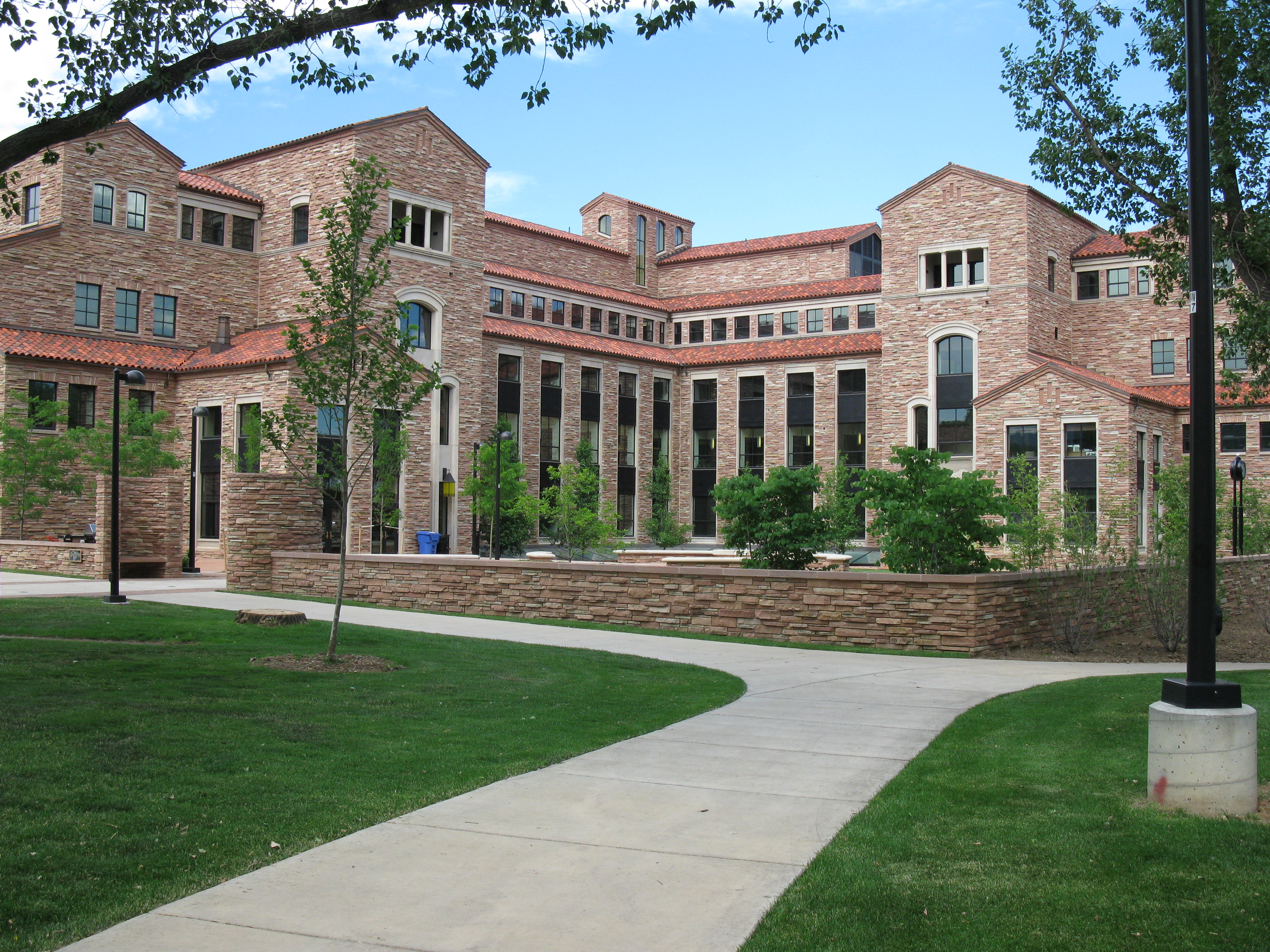
The EESI is located in the Wolf Law Building

EESI is located within the Wolf Law Building, which houses the University of Colorado Law School. Situated on the southern end of the University of Colorado at Boulder campus, the Wolf Law Building was completed in August 2006 and dedicated on September 8. Approximately 60 percent of the Wolf Law Building was financed by University of Colorado at Boulder students. Under the Leadership in Energy and Environmental Design (LEED) Green Building Rating System, the Wolf Law Building has received Gold certification. It is the first publicly supported law school in the country to obtain Gold.

As the parent organization of EESI, the University of Colorado Law School is well known for its strength in the area of environmental law. The U.S. News & World Report's 2008 edition of America's Best Graduate Schools (reporting on 2005-6 academic-year data) ranks the law school's environmental law program as 4th in the United States.

== Parent organizations ==
- University of Colorado Law School
- University of Colorado at Boulder

== See also ==
- Electrical energy efficiency on United States farms
- List of energy topics
- Mitigation of global warming
- Renewable energy development
- Sustainable energy
