= Joseph A. Sewall =

American academic (1830–1917)

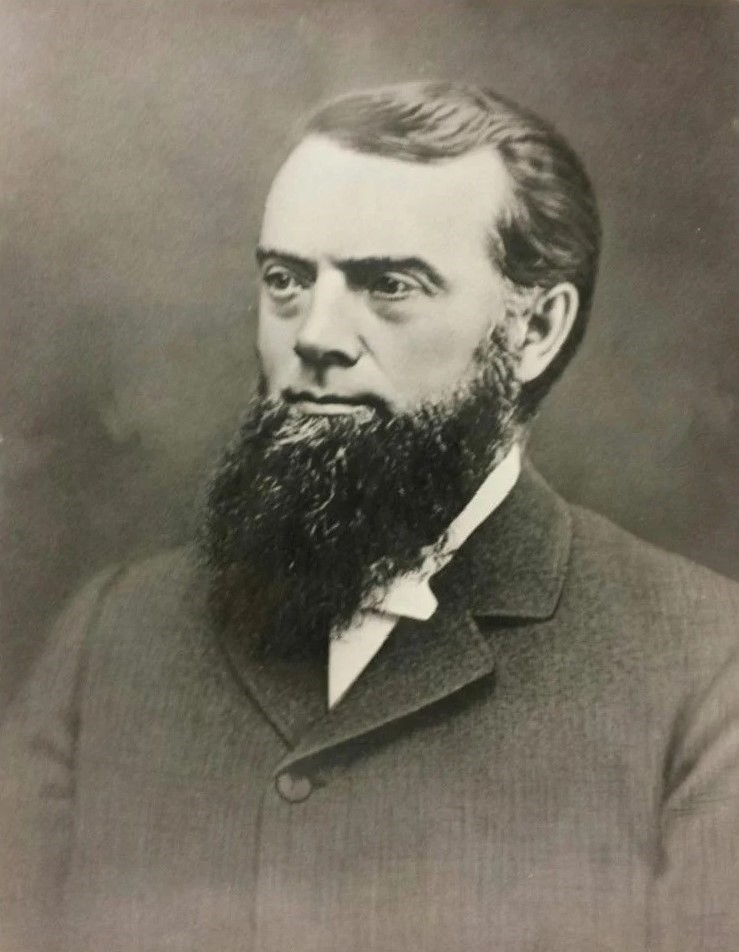

President of the University of Colorado
- In office 1877–1887
- Succeeded by: Horace M. Hale

Personal details
- Born: April 20, 1830 Scarborough, Maine, U.S.
- Died: January 17, 1917 (aged 86) Denver, Colorado, U.S.
- Spouse: Ann Edwards Foss (m. 1858)

Joseph Addison Sewall (April 20, 1830 – January 17, 1917) was an American physician, scientist and academic administrator who served as the first president of the University of Colorado from 1877 to 1887.

== Early life and education ==
Born on April 20, 1830 in Scarborough, Maine, Sewall attended the district school until the age of fifteen before attending Biddeford High School for two years. He then studied medicine under the guidance of Dr. Nathaniel Brooks in Saco, Maine.

In October 1854, Sewall moved to Illinois where he was subsequently invited to teach natural sciences at the new Illinois State Normal University by Charles Hovey. In preparation, he returned to the east coast where he studied agricultural chemistry at Yale University. Sewall then enrolled at the Lawrence Scientific School in 1859. There he was taught chemistry by Eben Horsford, botany by Asa Gray and natural history by Louis Agassiz until 1860.

Some sources report that Sewall received an M.D. degree from Harvard Medical School in 1852 and a Ph.D. degree from the Lawrence Scientific School in 1860, but this cannot be confirmed from published Harvard alumni records. Though well educated, he may never have completed a college degree. Sewall was, however, conferred an honorary LL.D. degree by Knox College in 1877.

== Career ==
In 1852, Sewall opened his own medical practice in Bangor, Maine. After less than two years, he moved to the home of an uncle in Dover, Illinois because of failing health. Sewall taught school in Dover, but later obtained a position at the Union School in Princeton, Illinois. Continuing to suffer from poor health, he moved to Tonica, Illinois and opened a pharmacy. Offered a teaching position at Illinois State Normal University, Sewall closed his pharmacy and went to Connecticut for additional training.

From 1860 to 1877, Sewall was professor of chemistry and natural sciences at Illinois State Normal University. From 1877 to 1887, he served as the first president of the University of Colorado. At the same time, Sewall was professor of chemistry and metallurgy. In addition, he taught natural philosophy, biology, botany, physics, pedagogy, political economy, astronomy, physiology and logic.

From 1888 to 1892, Sewall was professor and chair of natural sciences at the University of Denver. He was also professor of medicine, Colorado state chemist and Denver city chemist. Sewall also served as director of the U.S. Grass and Forage Experiment Station in Garden City, Kansas.

== Personal ==
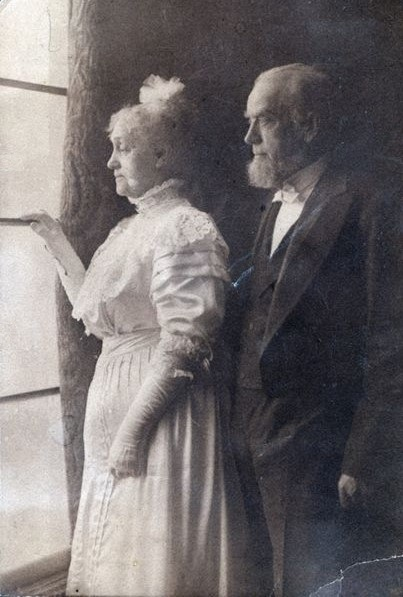
Joseph Sewall and his wife Ann in 1908

Sewall was the son of Stephen Sewall and Mary "Polly" (Milliken) Sewall. His father was a Thomsonian physician who prescribed herbal remedies. Sewall had three brothers and two sisters, all of whom died from tuberculosis.

On February 11, 1858, Sewall married Ann Edwards (Foss) Weston. They had four daughters and a son.

On January 17, 1917, Sewall died at his home in Denver. He was interred at Fairmount Cemetery two days later.

== Publications ==
- A Condensed Botany (1872)
- Grass and Forage Experiment Station at Garden City, Kansas (1891)
