= Margot Kaminski =

American AI and privacy professor

Margot E. Kaminski
- Kaminski in 2015
- Occupation: Associate Professor
- Known for: Artificial Intelligence; Information Privacy; AI Ethics

Academic background
- Education: Harvard University (BA); Yale University (JD)

Academic work
- Institutions: University of Colorado Law School; Yale Law School; Ohio State University Moritz College of Law

Margot E. Kaminski (/ˈmɑːrɡoʊ kəˈmɪnski/) is an American professor who works at the intersection of artificial intelligence, privacy, information governance, and online civil liberties. She is currently an Associate Professor at the University of Colorado Law School and the Director of Privacy Initiative at the Silicon Flatirons Center for Law, Technology, and Entrepreneurship. Her research examines the impacts of new technologies, including autonomous systems, on individual rights to help shape policy and regulation of AI.

Prior to joining Colorado Law, Kaminski was a lecturer at Yale Law School, an Assistant Professor at the Ohio State University Moritz College of Law from 2014 to 2017, and had served as a law clerk to Andrew Kleinfeld, senior judge of the Ninth Circuit Court of Appeals.

Kaminski was selected as one of the 100 Brilliant Women in AI Ethics in 2020.

== Education ==
Kaminski graduated magna cum laude with a B.A. from Harvard University in 2004, where she wrote for The Harvard Crimson. She graduated from Yale Law School in 2010. While at Yale, she co-founded the Media Freedom and Information Access Clinic and was a Knight Law and Media Scholar.

== Career and research ==
After graduation from Yale Law School, Kaminski clerked for Andrew Kleinfeld of the Ninth Circuit Court of Appeals and served as the executive director of the Information Society Project at Yale Law School for three years. Then, she joined the Ohio State University Moritz College of Law as an Assistant Professor in 2014, specializing in privacy, intellectual property, and technology law. There, she was selected to serve as fellow of the DC Center for Democracy & Technology.

Margot Kaminski is currently an associate professor at the University of Colorado Law School and Director of the Privacy Initiative at Silicon Flatirons.

In 2019, Kaminski co-authored Algorithmic Impact Assessments under the GDPR with Giancludio Malgieri. The paper attempted to link the risks of profile algorithms, automated decision-making with the EU General Data Protection Regulation tools towards more accountability. Both presented their paper to the U.S. Senate. Her works have also been published in The New York Times, The Economist, and The Atlantic.

== Selected awards and recognition ==
- 2016 - Featured in Lawfare's List of Female Technology Experts
- 2019 - Received 10th Annual Privacy Paper for Policymakers Award from the Future of Privacy Forum
- 2019 - Received Provost Faculty Achievement Award for AI, Data Privacy, and Human Decision-making
- 2020 - 100 Brilliant Women in AI Ethics Hall of Fame Honoree
