= Suzette M. Malveaux =

American jurist (born 1966)

- Born: December 4, 1966 (age 59); Lansing, Michigan, U.S.
- Education: Harvard University; NYU Law School
- Occupations: Law professor and civil rights lawyer
- Relatives: Suzanne Malveaux (sister)

Suzette M. Malveaux (born December 4, 1966) is an American law professor and civil rights lawyer. She joined the Washington and Lee University School of Law in 2024 as the Roger D. Groot Professor of Law. Previously she was Provost Professor of Civil Rights Law and director of the Byron R. White Center for the Study of American Law at the University of Colorado Law School.

Malveaux has also taught at the Columbus School of Law (where she was associate dean of Academic Affairs and interim director of the Institute for Law and Public Policy) and the University of Alabama School of Law. She teaches civil procedure, complex litigation, employment discrimination and civil rights. She is a nationally recognized expert on civil rights law and class action litigation, and has appeared before the U.S. Supreme Court (Green Tree Fin. Corp. v. Randolph) and argued before the 11th Circuit Court of Appeals. She is a member of the American Law Institute.

== Early life and education ==
Suzette Malveaux was born in Lansing, Michigan, into a family of Creole descent, and identifies as African-American. Her father, the late Floyd J. Malveaux, was the dean of the College of Medicine at Howard University, executive director of the Merck Childhood Asthma Network and a founder of Howard University's National Human Genome Center. Her mother, the late Myrna Ruiz Malveaux, was an early childhood educator. Suzette's twin sister is CNN correspondent Suzanne Malveaux.

Malveaux is a magna cum laude graduate of Harvard University (Class of 1988). At NYU Law School, she graduated in 1994 as a Root-Tilden Scholar, Law Review associate editor, Center for International Law fellow, NAACP Legal Defense Fund Earl Warren Scholar, and American Association of University Women fellow. Upon graduation, she clerked for the Honorable Robert L. Carter of the United States District Court for the Southern District of New York.

== Career ==
Malveaux started practicing law at the Washington Lawyers' Committee for Civil Rights and Urban Affairs (1995–1998), and then at Cohen Milstein (1998–2003). As a practicing attorney, Malveaux specialized in class action litigation, representing plaintiffs in such high-profile cases as Wal-Mart Stores, Inc. v. Dukes (the largest employment discrimination class action in U.S. history as of 2011) and Alexander, et al., v. Oklahoma, et al. (filed on behalf of the victims of Tulsa race massacre of 1921).

In 2003, Malveaux began her teaching career at the University of Alabama School of Law. She joined the faculty of the Columbus School of Law, at the Catholic University of America in 2006. In 2018, Malveaux joined the University of Colorado Law School, as the Provost Professor of Civil Rights Law and director of the Byron R. White Center for Study of American Constitutional Law. She began teaching at Washington & Lee Law School in 2024.

Malveaux is a frequent commentator on legal issues involving the U.S. Supreme Court, the civil legal system, and civil rights. Media outlets in which she has appeared include CNN, MSNBC, Al Jazeera English, and the PBS Newshour. She has also been interviewed by The New York Times, The Wall Street Journal, and The National Law Journal.
