= University of Colorado Law School =

Public law school in Boulder, Colorado, US

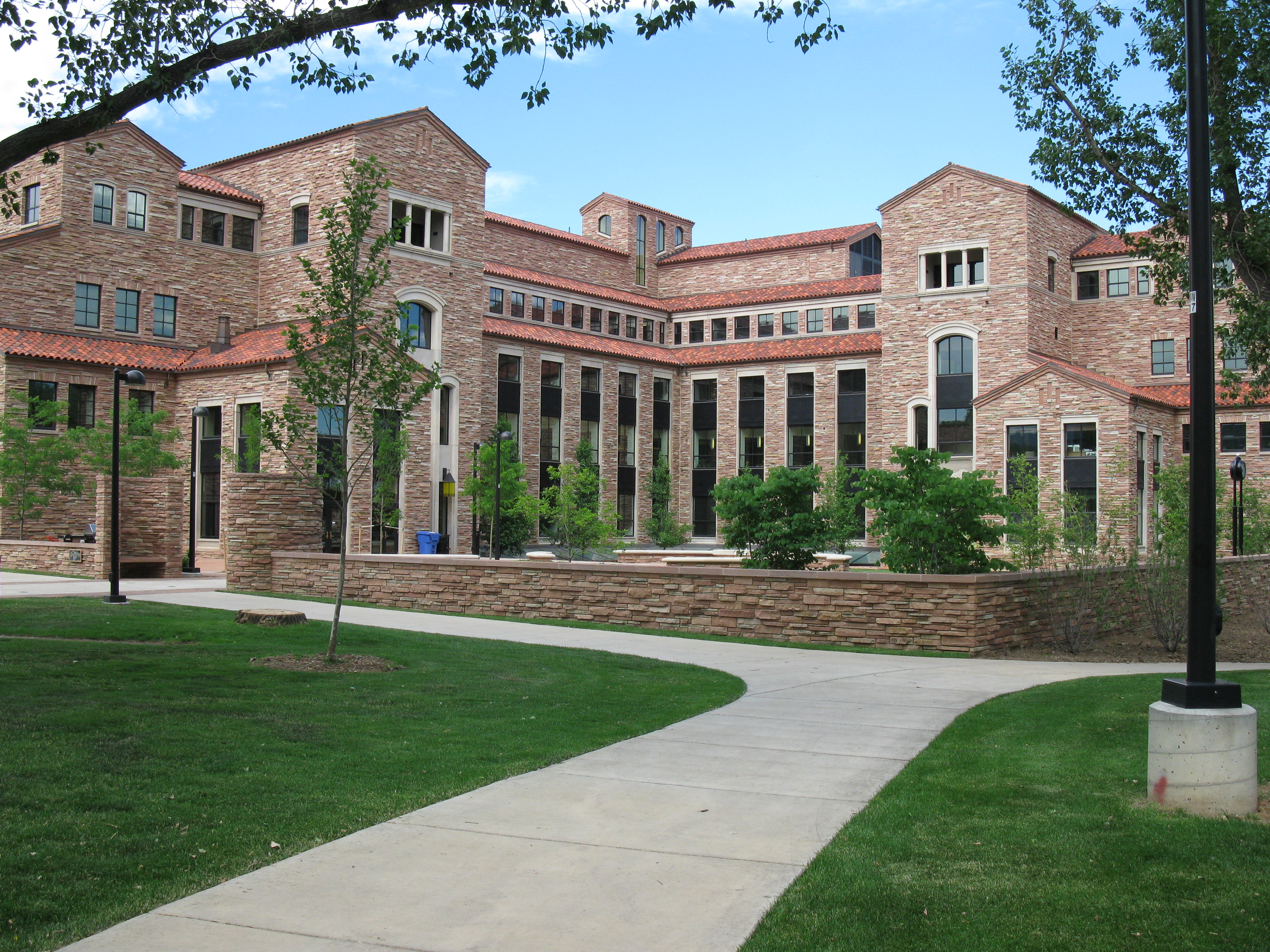
- Motto: Let Your Light Shine
- Established: 1892
- School type: Public
- Parent endowment: $2.25 billion (2024)
- Dean: Lolita Buckner Inniss
- Location: Boulder, Colorado, US; 40°00′05″N 105°15′45″W
- Enrollment: 511
- Faculty: 125
- USNWR ranking: 48th (tie) (2024)
- Bar pass rate: 90.42% (first time takers)
- Website: www.colorado.edu/law/
- ABA profile: University of Colorado Law School

The University of Colorado Law School is one of the professional graduate schools within the University of Colorado System. It is a public law school, with more than 500 students attending and working toward a Juris Doctor or Master of Studies in Law. The Wolf Law Building is located in Boulder, Colorado, and is sited on the south side of the University of Colorado at Boulder campus. The law school houses the William A. Wise Law Library, which is a regional archive for federal government materials and is open to the public. United States Supreme Court Justice Wiley Blount Rutledge graduated from the University of Colorado Law School in 1922.

According to Colorado's official 2015 ABA-required disclosures, 74.2% of the Class of 2015 obtained full-time, long-term, JD-required employment nine months after graduation. For 2015 graduates, the overall employment rate was 96% at 10 months after graduation, including JD-required, JD-advantaged, and other positions.

== History ==
Established in 1892, the University of Colorado Law School is a charter member in the Association of American Law Schools and appeared in 1923 on American Bar Association's first ever publication of approved law schools. Although always located on the greater Boulder campus, the law school has occupied five buildings since its founding. For the first two years of its existence, the school was housed in the Kent building. From 1894 to 1909 the school occupied the Hale Law Building. For the next 50 years, until 1959, the school occupied the Guggenheim Law Building. From 1959 to 2005, the law school occupied the Fleming Law Building. In the fall of 2006, the law school once again moved and now sits in the Wolf Law Building.

== The Wolf Law Building ==
By the late 1990s, Colorado Law had outgrown its building. In 1997 law students voted to tax themselves with a $1,000 per year tuition differential to help finance the building, but in 2001 the State of Colorado General Assembly rescinded its earmarked funds from the project. Facing the risk of accreditation loss, law students worked with campus leaders and successfully passed a $400 per year fee on all Boulder students to fund capital construction on the Wolf Law Building and three other campus projects. The Wolf Law Building was dedicated on September 8, 2006, by United States Supreme Court justice Stephen Breyer. The dedication ceremony represented the end of a long and creative funding process for a public law school.

In addition to student funds, over $13 million in private gifts were donated to support the construction of the new law building. The Wolf family, in honor of Leon and Dora Wolf, were especially generous in their contribution to the new building that now bears their family name.

The Wolf Law Building was constructed under the United States Green Building Council's LEED certification rating system for environmental sustainability and received a Gold rating. Colorado Law is the second law school to be housed in a certified LEED building.

== Admissions ==
The school received 2,792 applications for the class of 2023 and matriculated 185 students. The 25th and 75th percentile LSAT scores for entering students were 158 and 164, respectively; the median LSAT was 163. The 25th and 75th percentile GPA for entering students was 3.39 and 3.78, with a median of 3.65.

== Employment ==
According to Colorado's official 2015 ABA-required disclosures, 74.2% of the Class of 2015 obtained full-time, long-term, JD-required employment nine months after graduation. Colorado's Law School Transparency under-employment score is 8.8%, indicating the percentage of the Class of 2015 unemployed, pursuing an additional degree, or working in a non-professional, short-term, or part-time job nine months after graduation.

== Costs ==
The total cost of attendance (indicating the cost of tuition, fees, and living expenses) at Colorado for the 2013-2014 academic year is $51,110 for residents and $58,620 for nonresidents. The Law School Transparency estimated debt-financed cost of attendance for three years is $197,814 for residents and $219,168 for nonresidents.

=== Controversial 2009 employment statistics ===
In October 2009, the journal Law Week Colorado stirred controversy when it reported that only 35% of the school's Class of 2009 had jobs at graduation.

Officials from the school assailed the Law Week Colorado article. Former Assistant Dean of the Office of Career Development SuSaNi Harris called Law Week Colorado's report the product of a "miscalculation" and "misunderstanding" and claimed Law Week Colorado "confused 'employed' and 'unemployed.'" Later, Associate Dean Dayna Matthew told Law Week Colorado that the numbers released were "premature" and asserted that the National Association of Legal Professionals (NALP) would release more favorable statistics in February 2010. The reason, Matthew said, was that the NALP discounted graduates who did not report their employment status.

For its part, Law Week Colorado stuck to its original statistics and noted that the University of Colorado had not provided any new statistics.

== Ranking ==
As of 2025, the University of Colorado Law School is ranked 46th in the country by U.S News & World Report.

== Experiential Learning at the University of Colorado Law School ==
- Clinics: the American Indian Law Clinic, the Civil Practice Clinic, the Criminal Defense Clinic, the Entrepreneurial Law Clinic, Family Law Clinic, the Juvenile Law Clinic, the Natural Resources Law Clinic, and the Samuelson-Glushko Technology Law & Policy Clinic.
- Externships
- Public Service Pledge
- Appellate and Trial Competitions

== Publications ==
- University of Colorado Law Review
- Colorado Environmental Law Journal
  - formerly the Colorado Natural Resources, Energy & Environmental Law Review
- Colorado Technology Law Journal

== Notable faculty ==
- James Anaya
- Paul Campos
- Wiley Young Daniel, judge on the United States District Court for the District of Colorado
- Allison H. Eid, judge on the United States Court of Appeals for the Tenth Circuit
- Maurice B. Foley, judge on the United States Tax Court
- David Getches (deceased)
- Neil Gorsuch, Associate Justice on the Supreme Court of the United States
- Moses Hallett
- Melissa Hart, Justice on the Colorado Supreme Court
- Margot Kaminski
- Alice Madden
- Suzette M. Malveaux
- Gene Nichol
- Nancy E. Rice, Chief Justice of the Colorado Supreme Court
- James Grafton Rogers
- Pierre Schlag
- Don W. Sears
- Phil Weiser
- Charles Wilkinson (deceased)

== Centers ==
The Energy and Environmental Security Initiative (EESI), established in 2003, is an interdisciplinary Research and Policy Institute.

The Getches-Wilkinson Center for Natural Resources, Energy, and the Environment programs for law students and the general public. It hosts an annual lecture on natural resources law that honors alumnus Ruth Wright and another lecture series focused on energy policy. The Ruth Wright Distinguished Lecture Series has hosted former Secretary of the Interior and Arizona governor Bruce Babbitt, former Department of the Interior deputy secretary Michael Connor, former Department of the Interior solicitor John Leshy, and law professor Mary Wood, while the Schultz Lecture in Energy has hosted former Secretary of Energy and physics professor Steven Chu.

The Byron R. White Center for the Study of American Constitutional Law, named after former Supreme Court Justice and University of Colorado alumnus Byron White, seeks to enhance the study and teaching of constitutional law and to stimulate public debate and understanding of the US constitutional system. The Center sponsors public lectures and symposia.

The Silicon Flatirons Center for Law, Technology, and Entrepreneurship hosts nine yearly seminars and an annual symposium, supporting the Entrepreneurial Law Clinic and developing student interest and involvement in the technology sector.
