= Horace M. Hale =

American academic (1833–1901)

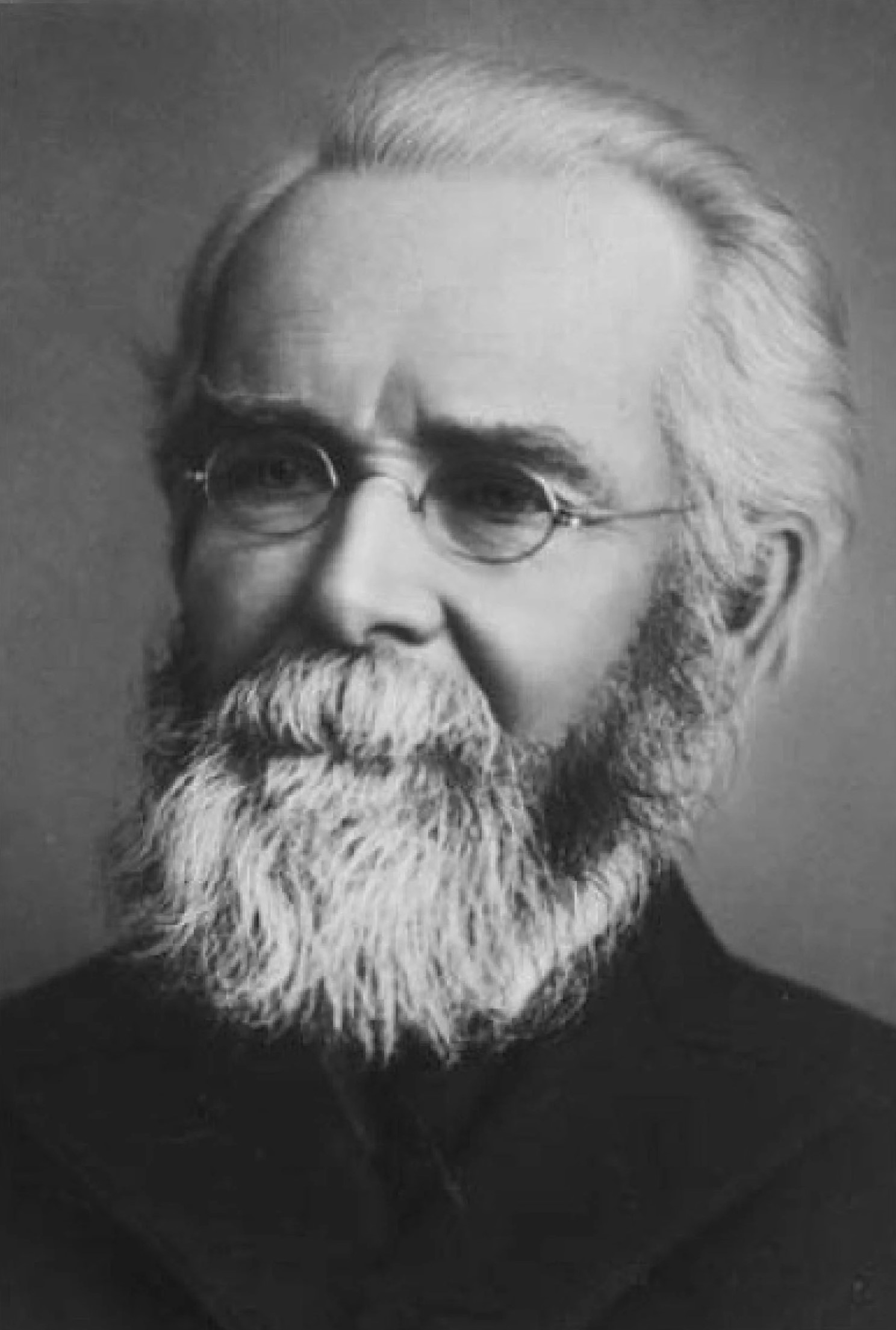

President of the University of Colorado
- In office 1887–1892
- Preceded by: Joseph A. Sewall
- Succeeded by: James H. Baker

Personal details
- Born: March 6, 1833 Hollis, New Hampshire, U.S.
- Died: October 24, 1901 (aged 68) Denver, Colorado, U.S.
- Spouse: Martha Eliza Huntington (m. 1859)
- Children: Irving Hale
- Education: Union College (A.B.)

Horace Morrison Hale (March 6, 1833 – October 24, 1901) was an American educator and academic administrator who served as the second president of the University of Colorado from 1887 to 1892. He previously served as Colorado's first State Superintendent of Public Instruction from August 1876 to January 1877.

== Biography ==
Born on March 6, 1833, in Hollis, New Hampshire, Hale moved with his family to Rome, New York, in 1837 and then to North Bloomfield, Ontario County, New York, in 1840. His father was a mechanic and inventor, and Horace Hale gained experience working in the family machine shops until his father's death in 1852. He then worked his way through college, attending Genesee Wesleyan Seminary for a year, Genesee College for two years and Union College for a year. Hale completed his A.B. degree at Union College in 1856.

After graduation, Hale taught school in West Bloomfield, New York, for a year. He then taught in Nashville, Tennessee, until 1861, when he returned to North Bloomfield after Tennessee seceded from the Union. Hale soon obtained a new teaching position in Detroit, Michigan, where he also began to study law. He was admitted to the Michigan bar in 1863, but had developed a severe case of bronchitis. On the advice of his physician, he moved to the home of his brother Albert Hale in Central City, Colorado. Over the next five years, Horace Hale engaged in physical outdoor labor until he had fully recovered.

In 1868, Hale became principal of the Central City public schools. In 1873, he was appointed Colorado's Territorial Superintendent of Public Instruction by Governor Samuel Elbert. After Colorado was granted statehood in August 1876, Hale briefly served as the first State Superintendent of Public Instruction before returning to his job as principal of the Central City public schools in 1877. Over the next ten years, he remained principal but assumed many additional duties. In 1878, he was elected to a six-year term as a regent of the University of Colorado as a Republican. In 1882 and 1883, Hale served as mayor of Central City. He also served as superintendent of the Gilpin County schools.

In 1887, Hale was appointed president of the University of Colorado by the board of regents. During his four-and-a-half-year term in office, he worked to build public support and lobbied for increased state funding. Hale also further developed the Boulder campus, adding 700 trees, paved sidewalks and more buildings. In 1889, he was conferred an honorary LL.D. degree by Iowa Wesleyan University. In January 1892, Hale retired to Denver, Colorado.

== Legacy ==
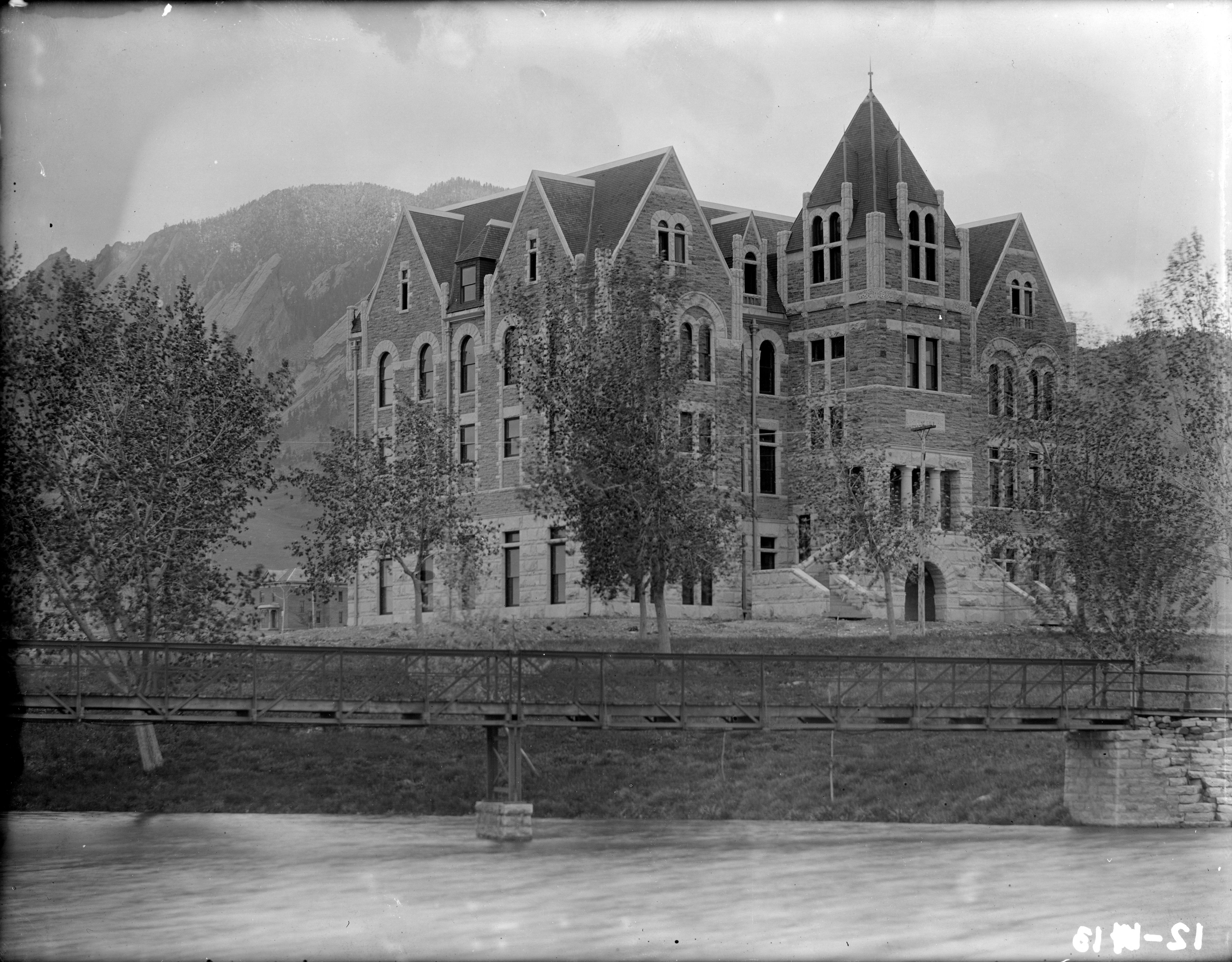
Hale Science Building

The Hale Science Building in Boulder, Colorado, was named in his honor. Construction of the building had begun during his term as president of the University of Colorado.

== Personal ==
Hale was the son of John Hale and Jane (Morrison) Hale. He had a sister and three older brothers.

Hale married Martha Eliza Huntington on August 4, 1859. They had one son, Irving Hale.

Hale died from heart disease in Denver on October 24, 1901. He was interred at Fairmount Cemetery three days later.

== Publications ==
- The Common School Law of the Territory of Colorado (1874)
- Education in Colorado, 1861–1885 (1885)
