= Andrew Marshall (foreign policy strategist) =

American foreign policy strategist

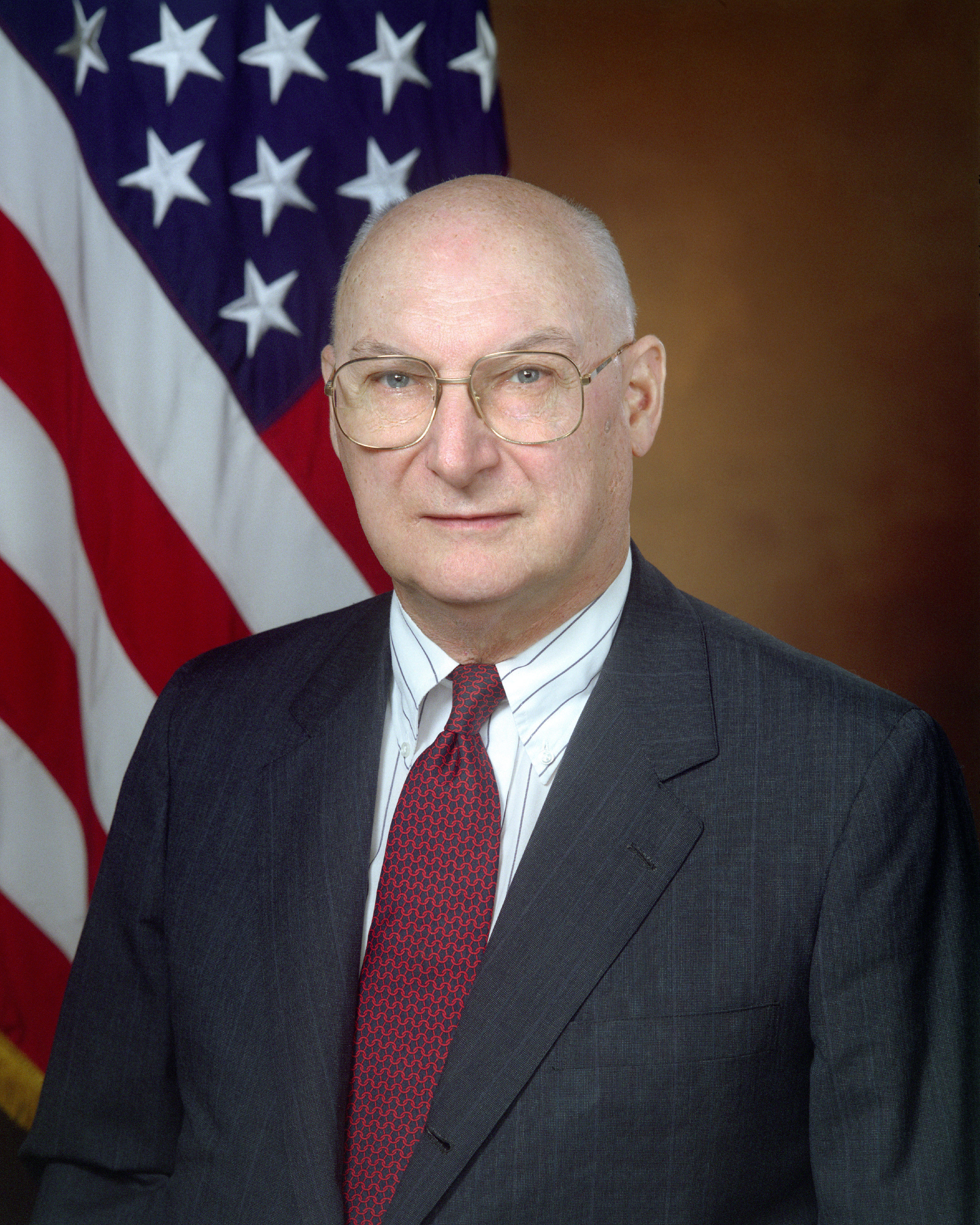

1st Director of Office of Net Assessment
- In office January 14, 1973 – January 2, 2015
- President: Richard Nixon; Gerald Ford; Jimmy Carter; Ronald Reagan; George H. W. Bush; Bill Clinton; George W. Bush; Barack Obama
- Preceded by: Office established
- Succeeded by: James H. Baker

Personal details
- Born: September 13, 1921 Detroit, Michigan, U.S.
- Died: March 26, 2019 (aged 97) Alexandria, Virginia, U.S.
- Education: University of Chicago; University of Detroit; Wayne State University; University of Chicago (MA); George Washington University
- Nickname: "Yoda"

Andrew W. "Yoda" Marshall (September 13, 1921 – March 26, 2019) was an American foreign policy strategist who served as director of the United States Department of Defense's Office of Net Assessment from 1973 to 2015. Appointed to the position by President Richard Nixon, Marshall remained in office during all successive administrations that followed until his retirement on January 2, 2015. He was succeeded in the role by James H. Baker.

== Early life and education ==
Raised in Detroit, Michigan, Marshall pursued autodidactic interests in history, literature and the natural and social sciences from a young age. He graduated from Cass Technical High School (where he trained in machining and received the second-highest score on a citywide aptitude test for honors students similar in provenance to the SAT) in 1939. After briefly working in a factory and attending the University of Detroit for a year, he dropped out to take a position at the Murray Body Company, where he manufactured machine tools used in fabricating British airplane parts. Unable to serve in World War II due to a heart murmur, Marshall continued to work at Murray for the remainder of the war. He eventually resumed his formal studies at Wayne State University in 1943.

Marshall was admitted to the University of Chicago with graduate standing in 1945; under the chancellery of Robert Maynard Hutchins, students who were not enrolled in the generalist "Chicago Plan" undergraduate program pursued a course of study that led to a master's degree instead of the baccalaureate. Strongly influenced by Friedrich Hayek, he earned an M.A. in economics from the institution in 1949. His master's thesis was a sensitivity analysis of Lawrence Klein's econometric model of the US economy; influential for its methodology, it has never been published except for a short abstract.

== RAND Corporation ==
After electing to defer his studies in favor of eventually pursuing a Ph.D. in statistics (a program not yet offered by the University of Chicago), Marshall joined the RAND Corporation, the original "think tank," at the behest of mentor W. Allen Wallis in 1949. While he would briefly return to academia to cover Wallis's courses during the 1953–1954 term and continued to take statistics courses at George Washington University, Marshall soon gained the cachet of being part of "a cadre of strategic thinkers" that coalesced at the RAND Corporation in the 1950s and 1960s, a group that also included Charles J. Hitch, Herman Kahn, James Schlesinger and Daniel Ellsberg. Notably, he worked with Kahn on developing and advancing Monte Carlo methods.

== Department of Defense's Office of Net Assessment ==
Schlesinger would later become the U.S. Secretary of Defense and personally oversaw the creation of the Office of Net Assessment where Marshall would become the first director. The original main task of the office was to provide strategic evaluations on nuclear war issues. James Roche, Secretary of the Air Force in the administration of George W. Bush, worked for Marshall during the 1970s.

Andrew Marshall was consulted for the 1992 draft of Defense Planning Guidance (DPG), created by then-Defense Department staffers I. Lewis Libby, Paul Wolfowitz, and Zalmay Khalilzad; all of whom took to influential roles in the administration of George W. Bush.

We studied RMA exhaustively. Our great hero was Andy Marshall in the Pentagon. We translated every word he wrote.
—General Chen Zhou, PLA

Marshall has been noted for fostering talent in younger associates, who then proceed to influential positions in and out of the federal government: "a slew of Marshall's former staffers have gone on to industry, academia and military think tanks." Dick Cheney, Donald Rumsfeld, and Wolfowitz, among others, have been cited as Marshall "star protégés."

In 2003, Marshall commissioned a report for the Pentagon predicting that abrupt climate change could bring the planet to the edge of anarchy as countries develop a nuclear threat to defend and secure dwindling food, water and energy supplies. The report, authored by Peter Schwartz and Doug Randall, predicted that 'catastrophic' shortages of water and energy supply would become increasingly harder to overcome, plunging the planet into war by 2020. Schwarz and Randall further claimed that major European cities would be sunk beneath rising seas as Britain is plunged into a 'Siberian' climate by 2020. At the time of the report's publishing, it became notable for its link to Marshall and its accusations that leadership of the Pentagon purportedly "covered up" the report for four months until it was obtained by the British weekly The Observer.

In an interview in 2012, Major General Chen Zhou, the main author of four Chinese defence white papers, stated that Marshall was one of the most important figures in changing Chinese defence thinking in the 1990s and 2000s.

Andrew Marshall funded and published three best selling books by Michael Pillsbury: Chinese Views of Future Warfare in 1998, China Debates the Future Security Environment, and in 2015 an international bestseller, The Hundred-Year Marathon: China's Secret Strategy to Replace America. According to a biography, The Last Warrior: Andrew Marshall and the Shaping of Modern American Defense Strategy, "There was every reason for Marshall to expect that Chinese modes of thought would be even more alien to American ways of thinking than the Soviet leadership's had been, and that some insight into the thinking of China's political and military leaders could be gleaned from surveying open source writings. Pillsbury's work on China, which Marshall had encouraged and supported since the early 1970s, illustrates both points." According to The New York Times March 26, 2019, obituary of Marshall, "His gift was the framing of the question, the discovery of the critical question," said Michael Pillsbury, a China expert who advised and worked with Mr. Marshall throughout his career." The Washington Post obituary about Marshall stated, "He had an uncanny ability to pick out only the most significant questions, then to drill down deeply," Pillsbury, a colleague of 45 years, said in an interview. "He developed an iconoclastic, contrarian image."

Foreign Policy named Marshall one of its 2012 Top 100 Global Thinkers, "for thinking way, way outside the Pentagon box".

== Death ==
Marshall died on March 26, 2019, in Arlington, Virginia, at the age of 97. House Armed Services Committee ranking member Rep. Mac Thornberry (R-TX) announced his death during a hearing, saying, "I can think of fewer people who have had a bigger impact of focusing our defense efforts, our national security, in the right direction than Mr. Marshall. He has been before our committee I don’t know how many times over the years. So I wanted to note that passing, but also to honor his memory because he made such a difference."
