= Livingston Farrand =

American academic administrator (1867–1939)

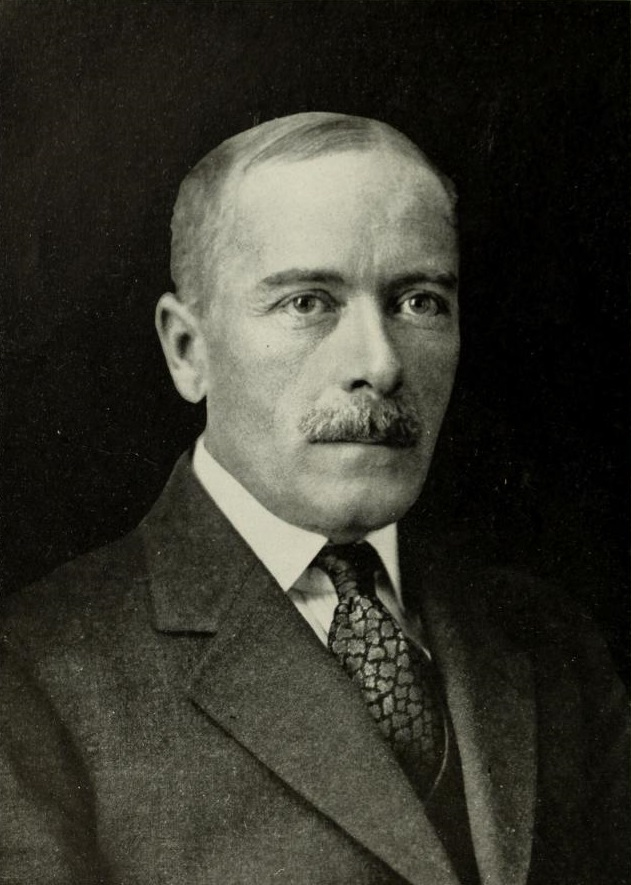

President of Cornell University
- In office 1921–1937
- Preceded by: Jacob Gould Schurman
- Succeeded by: Edmund Ezra Day

President of the University of Colorado
- In office 1914–1919
- Preceded by: James H. Baker
- Succeeded by: George Norlin

Personal details
- Born: June 14, 1867 Newark, New Jersey, US
- Died: November 8, 1939 (aged 72) New York City, US
- Education: Princeton University (A.B.); Columbia College of Physicians & Surgeons (M.D.)

Livingston Farrand (June 14, 1867 – November 8, 1939) was an American physician, anthropologist, psychologist, public health advocate and academic administrator. He was president of Cornell University and the University of Colorado.

== Early life and education ==
Born in Newark, New Jersey, to Dr. Samuel Ashbel Farrand, headmaster of the historic Newark Academy, and Rachel Louise (Wilson) Farrand, Farrand received an undergraduate degree from Princeton in 1888, and went on to the Columbia College of Physicians and Surgeons, where he earned his M.D. in 1891.

He attended the Universities of Cambridge and Berlin, studying physiological psychology.

== Academia ==
After graduating in 1893, he went on to serve as adjunct professor of psychology at Columbia. Due to the influence of Franz Boas - who had joined Columbia in 1896 - Farrand became more involved in anthropology. He joined Boas on expeditions to the Pacific Northwest (notably, the Jesup North Pacific Expedition) and became a full professor of anthropology at Columbia in 1903. He remained at Columbia until 1914.

In 1904 Farrand wrote Basis of American History, 1500-1900. It focused on Native Americans and was part of the multi-volume The American Nation series (28 volumes, 1903–1918) edited by Albert Bushnell Hart. It has been seen as a recognition of Farrand's expertise in anthropology.

== Public health ==
He became executive secretary of the National Association for the Study and Prevention of Tuberculosis in 1905. The organisation's cooperation between medical professionals and laymen was hailed as pioneering and stimulating similar collaborations in other areas of public health.

In 1914 became president of the University of Colorado, and held that position until 1919. From 1912 to 1914, he was treasurer of the American Public Health Association, during the same period editing the American Journal of Public Health.

During World War I he was director in France of the International Health Board, 1917–19. His public health work led to his appointment as chairman of the central committee of the American Red Cross and he worked to fight tuberculosis for the Rockefeller Foundation in France in 1917. His involvement in the latter has been described as the "most important permanent result of the great American effort in France during the World War".

== Cornell University ==
In 1921, he became the fourth president of Cornell University. Under his leadership, Cornell's enrollment and endowment increased rapidly. He also expanded Cornell-in-China with the University of Nanking and in 1931 saw the arrival in Ithaca of students from the Soviet Union. The unified College of Engineering was created as was the College of Home Economics.

In 1929, he declined to intervene on behalf of two students who had been denied residency in the women's dormitories at Sage Hall on the basis of their race. In reply to a letter from the mother of one of these women, he wrote, "... while I have great sympathy for your feeling, I cannot order a change in the procedure of the Dean of Women, under whose jurisdiction the matter falls".

== Family ==
Livingston was the brother of Max Farrand, Professor of History at Stanford University and Yale University. Max's wife was landscape architect Beatrix Farrand.

== Honours ==
Farrand was a fellow of American Association for the Advancement of Science, and member of the American Psychological Association, American Anthropological Association, the American Climatological Association, the American Philosophical Society, and the American Folklore Society, for whom he served as president in 1903.

For his services in the building up of an effective anti-tuberculosis organization at the end of World War One, the French government made Farrand both an officer of the Legion of Honor and a Commander of the Legion of Honour.

Academic offices
Preceded by Jacob Gould Schurman	President of Cornell University; 1921–1937	Next: Edmund Ezra Day
