= David Getches =

American lawyer

14th Dean of the University of Colorado Law School
- In office July 2003 – June 2011
- Preceded by: Harold Bruff
- Succeeded by: Phil Weiser

Personal details
- Born: David Harding Getches; August 17, 1942 Abington Township, Montgomery County, Pennsylvania, U.S.
- Died: July 5, 2011 (aged 68) Boulder, Colorado, U.S.
- Spouse: Ann Marks (m. 1962)
- Education: Occidental College (BA); University of Southern California Law School (JD)

David Harding Getches (August 17, 1942 – July 5, 2011) was dean and Raphael J. Moses Professor of Natural Resources Law at the University of Colorado Law School in Boulder, Colorado. He taught and wrote on water law, public land law, environmental law, and Indian law.

== Biography ==
Getches was born in Abington, Pennsylvania in 1942. He received his B.A. in political science from Occidental College. He received his J.D. degree from the University of Southern California Law School and was admitted to the California Bar in 1968.

He worked for a year at the San Diego law firm of Luce, Forward, Hamilton & Scripps, then in 1968 became co-directing attorney at the California Indian Legal Services in Escondido. From 1970 to 1976, he founded and then served as executive director of the Native American Rights Fund (NARF), a nonprofit law firm specializing in Native American issues. While at NARF, he served as lead counsel on the controversial case United States v. Washington, 384 F.Supp 312 (W.D. Wash. 1974), also known as the Boldt Decision, a case that affirmed the right of most Indian tribes in Washington State to harvest salmon. From 1977 to 1979, he worked with his law partner Bruce Greene at Getches and Greene.

Getches joined the law faculty at the University of Colorado School of Law in 1979. While at the school, he served as faculty advisor to the Natural Resources Law Center, Colorado Journal of International Environmental Law and Policy, Indian Law Clinic, and other programs. He took two leaves of absence from the university, first to serve as the executive director of the Colorado Department of Natural Resources, during the administration of Governor Richard Lamm, from 1983 to 1987, and then to serve as a special consultant to the United States Secretary of the Interior in 1996.

In 2003, he was appointed to serve as dean of the law school. While serving as dean, he led the effort to build the Wolf Law Building, a building notable on the campus for having 100% of its electrical power drawn from renewable energy sources. In addition to classroom and lab space, it houses the William A. Wise Law Library, which is the most comprehensive law library in the 12-state Rocky Mountain region and one of the largest in the country. In 2009, the Natural Resources Law Teachers Committee awarded Getches the Clyde O. Martz Teaching Award for excellence in teaching natural resources law.

On June 30, 2011, Getches stepped down from his position as dean. He died of an aggressive and advanced form of pancreatic cancer on July 5, 2011. The next day, the National Congress of American Indians (NCAI) unanimously voted to give Getches the NCAI Lifetime Achievement Award, which is one of its highest honors. The award is given to individuals who produce significant and influential work that honors the place of American Indian nations, cultures and governments through a lifetime of work and personal dedication. The Native American Rights Fund (NARF) dedicated the 2011 edition of its annual report to Getches, citing his lifetime of scholarship and litigation to advance Indian law. The CU Boulder Alumni Association presented him with the Robert L. Stearns Award for extraordinary achievement and service to the university and students. The Class of 96 endowed the David H. Getches Scholarship in honor of his commitment and service to the University of Colorado Law School, and Colorado Law students benefit from tens of thousands of dollars in scholarships and fellowships distributed every year by other funds established in his honor.

In January 2013, the University of Colorado Law School created the Getches-Wilkinson Center for Natural Resources, Energy, and the Environment to support research in the areas of natural resources, energy and the environment. The center was named for Professor Getches and Professor Charles Wilkinson to honor their contributions in these areas of study.

== Public service ==
David Getches served on nonprofit and public interest boards, committees, and councils in his areas of expertise and interest. He chaired the board of directors of the Land and Water Fund of the Rockies from 1989 to 1999. Also in 1989, he was of Counsel to Centro de Derecho Ambiental y de los Recursos Naturales. He served on the board of trustees for the Grand Canyon Trust from 1991 to 2011, including as chair from 1994 to 2001. From 1999 to 2011, he served on the Native American Lands Advisory Committee. In 2001, he co-founded the Colorado Water Trust and served on its board of directors from 2001 to 2011. He also served on the governing or senior advisory boards for the Center for Environmental Studies and Policy at the Fundación Neotropica Costa Rica, Rocky Mountain Mineral Law Foundation, The Trust for Public Land, Defenders of Wildlife, and Wilderness Society, among others.

== Publications ==
Professor Getches' publications included books, articles, Congressional testimony, speeches, litigation documents, and much more. Getches' writings are preserved in a special collection at the Wise Law Library at the University of Colorado Law School. Some of his better known works include:

- Water Law in a Nutshell (1997)
- Searching Out the Headwaters: Change and Rediscovery in Western Water Law and Policy, with Bates, MacDonnell and Wilkinson (1993)
- Controlling Water Use: The Unfinished Business of Water Quality Control, with MacDonnell and Rice (1991)
- Water Resource Management, with Tarlock and Corbridge (1993)
- Federal Indian Law, with Wilkinson and Williams (1998)

Academic offices
Preceded by Harold H. Bruff	14th Dean of the University of Colorado School of Law; 2003-2011	Succeeded by Phil Weiser
