= The Hundred-Year Marathon =

2015 book by Michael Pillsbury

- Author: Michael Pillsbury
- Language: English
- Subject: U.S.–China relations, statecraft, political science, Chinese history, international relations, foreign policy
- Genre: Non-fiction
- Published: 2015 (Henry Holt and Co)
- Publication place: United States
- Pages: 352
- ISBN: 978-1250081346
- Website: thehundredyearmarathon.com

The Hundred-Year Marathon: China's Secret Strategy to Replace America as the Global Superpower is a 2015 book by Michael Pillsbury. In the book, the author discusses China's strategy to surpass the United States as a leading global power by 2049. Drawing from his extensive experience as a China analyst and policy advisor, Pillsbury argues that this strategy is deeply rooted in Chinese statecraft and strategic thinking, employing methods that include economic growth, espionage, and the subtle manipulation of international norms. Once a "panda hugger," Pillsbury critiques China's stealthy, long-term tactics and analyzes China's historical strategies influencing its modern policies.

== Background ==
Pillsbury was assistant undersecretary of defense for policy planning during the Reagan administration and special assistant for Asian affairs in the Office of the Secretary of Defense under the George H. W. Bush administration. He had also been on the staff of four U.S. Senate Committees.

In April 2023, Pillsbury was named as one of Washington D.C.’s Most Influential People of 2023.

== Synopsis ==
Pillsbury interviewed Chinese defectors and examined declassified national security documents to challenge longstanding views and assumptions in U.S. foreign policy circles that China's rise would bring more peace and prosperity to the world.

In the book, Pillsbury says China's long-term strategy is to supplant the United States as the world's dominant power. He bases his theory on his understanding of Chinese history (especially the Warring States period), analysis of proposals by Chinese hawks in the Chinese government and examination of the strategies used by China's military. Pillsbury argues that China, drawing inspiration from the ancient Chinese strategist Sun Tzu, has been implementing its strategy largely unchallenged for decades and leads him to conclude that the U.S. misreading of China's "hundred-year marathon" constitutes its greatest intelligence failure of the past 50 years. He posits that China's strategy is rooted in its deep-seated sense of historical victimhood and desire to reclaim its historical preeminence in global affairs. Key elements of the strategies that Pillsbury identifies include Chinese inducements to foster US complacency which prevent it from viewing China as a competitor; manipulating America's elites into supporting its policies; concealing its advancement in military technology; exploiting America's openness to gain economic and technological advantages; and shaping international institutions and norms to favor the Chinese model of governance.

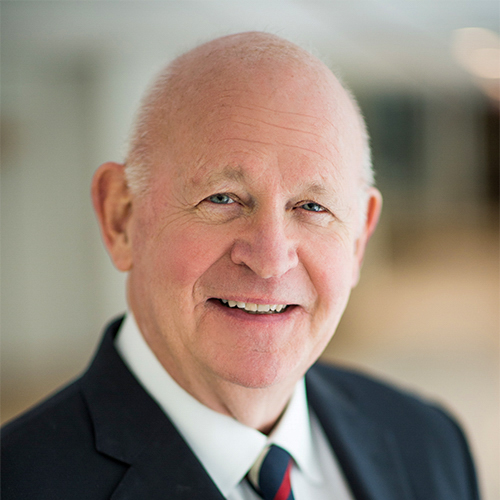
The author of The Hundred-Year Marathon, Michael Pillsbury

== Reception ==
In 2026, The Hundred-Year Marathon was included on the United States Secretary of the Air Force's reading list, a selection of works intended to improve Airmen's and Guardians' understanding of China as the United States' "pacing challenge."

In February 2015, The Hundred-Year Marathon landed the number one spot on The Washington Post bestseller's list, and The Christian Science Monitor included it on their list of the top ten books of the month.

Reviewers from The Washington Post and Fox News commended Pillsbury for his depth of knowledge and insight into Chinese strategic thinking and considered the book a wake-up call for American policymakers. PBS NewsHour, however, indicated that the book overstated China's capabilities and intentions by relying too heavily on the view of Chinese hawks. Rasmussen Reports criticized the book for not addressing competing views.

A Washington Times article noted that the book, cleared for publication by the Federal Bureau of Investigation (FBI), Central Intelligence Agency (CIA), and the Pentagon, discussed cooperation between the CIA and Chinese intelligence services to work against Russia.

Gordon Chang, writing in The National Interest, said the book “looks at the critical issues of who is in fact making policy in the Chinese capital,” calling Pillsbury “our time’s Paul Revere.”

Foreign Affairs praised the book as “pungently written and rich in detail,” with Andrew Nathan noting it “deserves to enter the mainstream of debate over the future of U.S.-Chinese relations.”

The Wall Street Journal described the work as “provocative… detailed and rigorous,” stating that assessing China's ambition “may be the central foreign-policy challenge of our time.”

Elizabeth Economy of the Council on Foreign Relations called it “a highly engaging and thought-provoking read” that is “well worth a careful read.”

The Christian Science Monitor noted the book “deserves to be widely read and debated,” despite its weighty subject matter.

The Weekly Standard highlighted Pillsbury's “eye-popping amount of declassified material,” stating that “the marathon is hardly over.”

The Washington Times warned that the book presents a scenario where the West may ask “‘Who lost the world?’ The answer will be, ‘We did.’”

Robert Kagan called it “a sobering corrective to what has long been the dominant, soothing narrative of Sino‑American cooperation” and “the most important book written about Chinese strategy and foreign policy in years.”

Graham Allison described it as “a provocative exploration of the historical sources of China’s grand strategy to become #1.”

James Mann noted that “given the direction China has been taking in the past few years, Pillsbury’s book takes on immediate relevance.”

Major Newspaper Reviews

- Wall Street Journal – Howard W. French reviewed The Hundred-Year Marathon as a compelling and provocative narrative about China's long-term ambitions to surpass the United States. French highlighted Pillsbury’s shift from a leading proponent of engagement with China to a strong critic of its strategic deception.
- Washington Times – Steven W. Mosher praised the book as a “devastating critique” of America's naiveté regarding China's ambitions. He emphasized Pillsbury's use of declassified Chinese documents and interviews to reveal China's long-term plans.
- Washington Post – The book was discussed in comparative analyses of China-related works, emphasizing its influence on debates about Beijing's global strategy, particularly under Xi Jinping's leadership.

Academic Journal Reviews

- Naval War College Review – The journal analyzed Pillsbury's thesis and its implications for understanding China's military and political posture. It assessed the book as influential in strategic and military education circles.
- Journal of Global Analysis – A review explored Pillsbury's framing of China's strategic deception and its resonance in international relations debates. The journal appreciated the empirical sources used to support his conclusions.
- Military Review (U.S. Army University Press) – This professional military journal discussed the relevance of Pillsbury's analysis for U.S. defense planning and strategic competition with China.

== Publishers and Editions ==
- Hebrew Edition:

Publisher: Sela Meir (סלע מאיר) 2022. Released in both print and digital formats; listed in major Israeli booksellers.

- Malaysian Edition:

Strategi Rahsia China: Gerak 100 Tahun Atasi Amerika Syarikat ISBN 978-967-0037-07-3, published by Inisiatif Buku Darul Ehsan, Malaysia Dec 2022.

- Simplified Chinese (PRC): 《百年马拉松——中国取代美国称霸全球的秘密战略》 || 国防大学出版社 (PLA National Defense University Press) || 2017 || —
- Traditional Chinese (Taiwan): 《2049百年馬拉松：中國稱霸全球的祕密戰略》 || 麥田出版 || 2015 / 2022 || 978-986-344-2639
- Japanese: 『百年マラソン』 || 日経BP社 (Nikkei BP) || 2016 || 978-4-8222-5104-8
- Korean: 《백년의 마라톤》 || 영림카디널 (Younglim Cardinal) || 2016 || 978-89-8401-207-3 / 978-89-8401-023-9
- Mongolian: 《Зуун жилийн марафон》 || Nepko Publishing || 2018 || 978-99978-51-34-5
- Vietnamese (U.S.): Cuộc Đua Marathon 100 Năm || Nhân Ảnh (San Jose, CA), with Việt-Hưng MRVN || 2019 || 978-1-927781-93-7
- Hebrew: מרתון מאה השנים || סלע מאיר (Sela Meir), in cooperation with קרן תקווה (Tikvah Fund) || c. 2017 || 978-1-386-001077-5
- Malay (Malaysia): Strategi Rahsia China: Gerak 100 Tahun Atasi Amerika Syarikat || Inisiatif Buku Darul Ehsan (IBDE) || 2019 || [ISBN needed]
- Bulgarian: Стогодишният маратон: Тайната стратегия на Китай за изместването на Америка като световна суперсила || Изток–Запад || 2015 || 9786191526673
- Hungarian: A százéves maraton: Kína titkos stratégiája Amerika globális szuperhatalomként való felváltására || Henry Holt and Co || 2014 || 9781627790109
- Romanian: Maratonul De O Suta De Ani. Strategia Secreta A Chinei De A Inlocui Sua Ca Superputere Globala || Editura Niculescu / Editura Antet || 2020 || 978-6063803468
- Czech: Stoletý maraton: Tajná čínská strategie, jak vystřídat Ameriku v roli globální supervelmoci a nastolit čínský světový řád || Rybka Publishers|| 2019 || 978-80-87950-67-8
- Croatian: Stogodišnji maraton: tajni plan Kine kako da nadmaši Sjedinjene Države i postane glavna svjetska supersila || Zagreb: Profil knjiga|| 2018 || 978-953-313-598-4
