= James H. Baker (DOD) =

American Department of Defense official

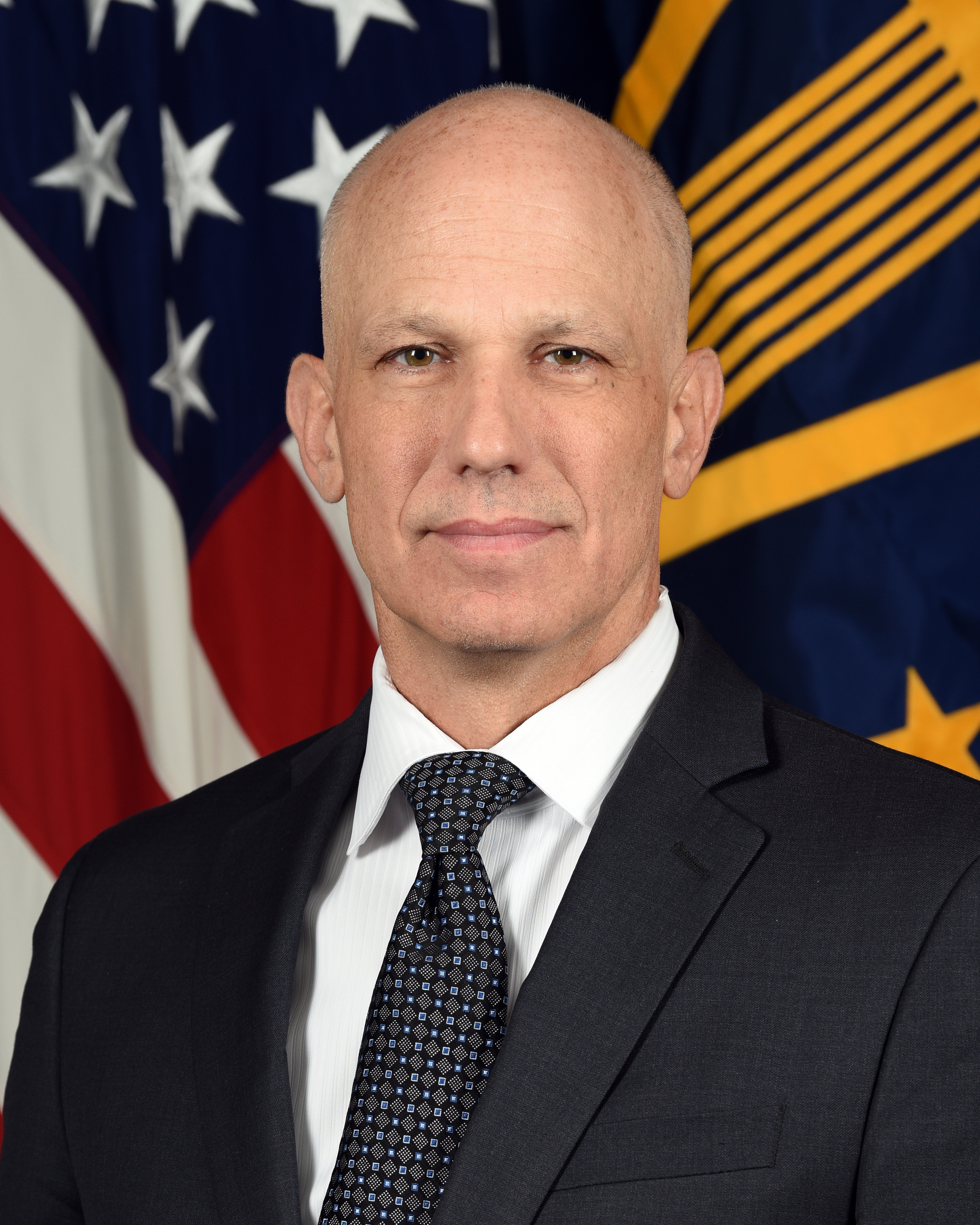

2nd Director of Office of Net Assessment
- In office May 14, 2015 – March 13, 2025
- President: Barack Obama; Donald Trump; Joe Biden; Donald Trump
- Preceded by: Andrew Marshall
- Succeeded by: Office abolished

Personal details
- Education: University of Florida (MS); Michigan State University (MS); National War College (MS); Air Command and Staff College (MS)

James "Jim" Baker is an American foreign policy advisor who formerly served as the director of the Office of Net Assessment in the United States Department of Defense.

== Education ==
Baker earned a master's degree in electrical engineering from Michigan State University in 1990. In 1993, he earned another master's degree, in operations research and systems engineering, from the University of Florida. In 1999, he attended the Air Force's Air Command and Staff College for a masters in Military Sciences. In 2006, he returned to school at the National War College to earn a master's in national security studies. He later completed certificate programs at the Massachusetts Institute of Technology and Harvard Business School.

== Career ==
On May 14, 2015 Baker was selected to be the director of the Office of Net Assessment. He is responsible for providing the United States Secretary of Defense with comparative assessments of the prospects of the military capabilities of the United States relative to other actors, as well as the political, economic and regional implications of those assessments. He previously served as strategist and advisor to two chairmen of the Joint Chiefs of Staff.

In May 2026, Baker was hired by Anthropic as a "strategist-in-residence".
