= David S. Yost =

David S. Yost (born 1948) is a professor at the Naval Postgraduate School, Monterey, California, in the Department of National Security Affairs, as well as a published author on international security, missile defense and nuclear deterrence. Dr. Yost has been a consultant to various organizations, including the Rand Corporation, the Hudson Institute, the Ford Foundation, the National Institute for Public Policy (NIPP), Sandia National Laboratories, Lawrence Livermore National Laboratory, and Los Alamos National Laboratory. He is a member of the editorial board of Comparative Strategy sponsored by NIPP and serves on the advisory council (Conseil Scientifique) of the Laboratoire de Recherche sur la Défense, Institut Français des Relations Internationales, Paris. He has been a member of the faculty at the Naval Postgraduate School since 1979.

== Education and fellowships ==
Dr. Yost earned a PhD in international relations at the University of Southern California in 1976. He worked in the Department of Defense, primarily in the Office of Net Assessment, in 1984–1986, while holding fellowships from NATO and the Council on Foreign Relations. He was a fellow in international security studies at the Woodrow Wilson International Center for Scholars, Smithsonian Institution in 1986; a visiting scholar at the School of Advanced International Studies, Johns Hopkins University, in 1986–1987; a Fulbright research fellow in Paris in 1990–1991; a visiting professor and research associate at the Centre des Hautes Études de l'Armement, École Militaire, Paris, in 1993–1994; a senior fellow at the United States Institute of Peace in Washington, D.C., in 1996–1997; and a senior research fellow at the NATO Defense College in Rome in 2004–2007.

== Research interests and publications ==
Dr. Yost's research interests include NATO; European security; U.S. national security policy; nuclear deterrence; missile defense; arms control; political philosophy; and international relations theory. He has written extensively and been published on many of these subjects.
