= Ruth Wright =

American state legislator in Colorado

Ruth Wright is an American former state legislator in Colorado and an environmentalist. A Democrat, she represented Boulder County in the Colorado House of Representatives from 1981 to 1994. She was an environmentalist. She was the second woman to serve as House Minority Leader in Colorado. The Boulder Public Library has a collection of her papers. She graduated cum laude from Marquette University in 1950 with a Bachelor of Philosophy degree. She then traveled abroad and lived in Germany, Austria, and Saudi Arabia. She married Ken Wright in 1954. She graduated from University of Colorado's Law School in 1972.
