= George Norlin =

American academic administrator

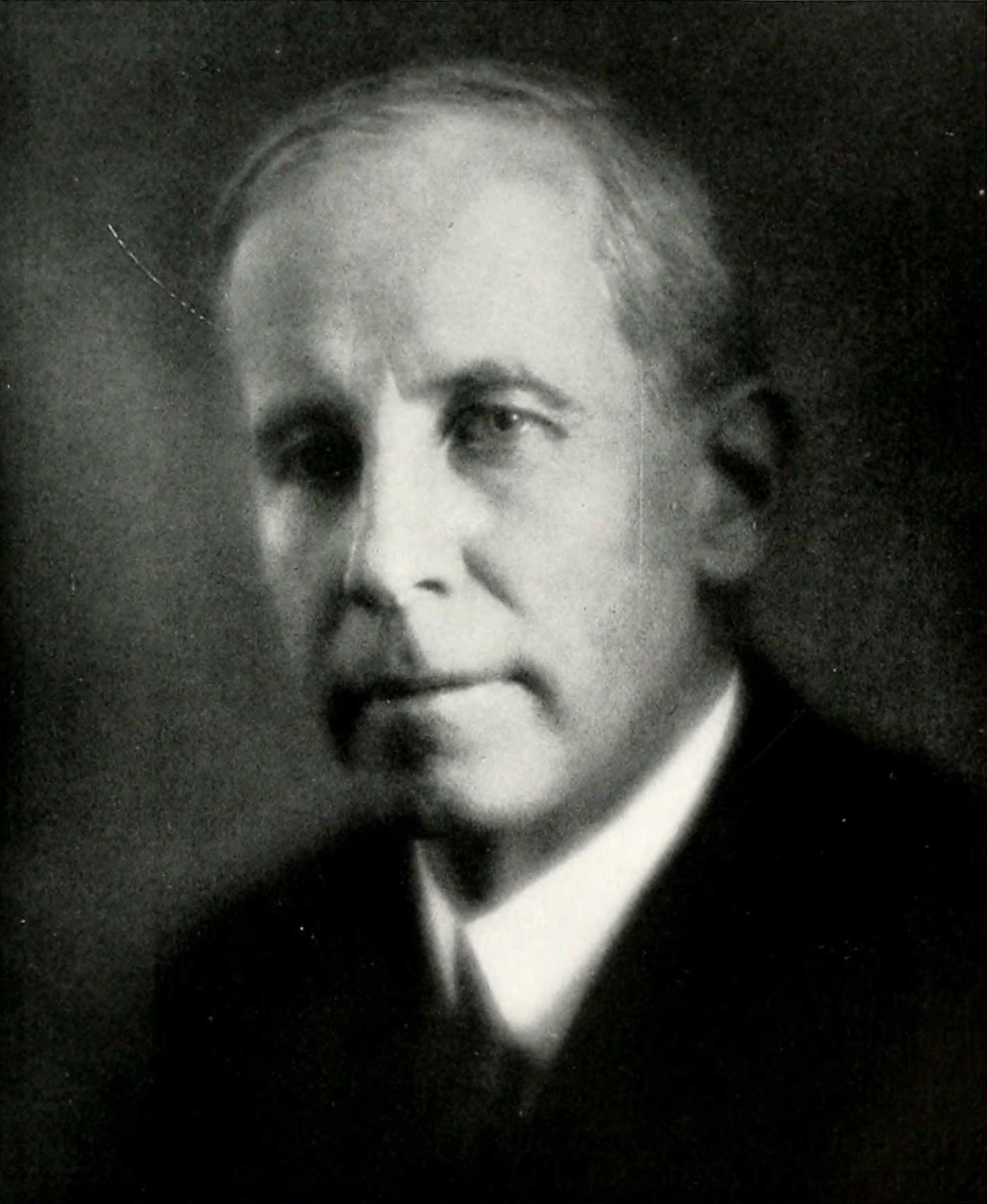

President of the University of Colorado
- In office February 24, 1919 – September 8, 1939; Acting: May 1917 – February 24, 1919
- Preceded by: Livingston Farrand
- Succeeded by: Robert L. Stearns

Personal details
- Born: April 1, 1871 Concordia, Kansas, U.S.
- Died: March 31, 1942 (aged 70) Boulder, Colorado, U.S.
- Spouse: Minnie Covert Deutcher (m. 1904; died 1942)
- Education: Hastings College (A.B.); University of Chicago (Ph.D.)

George Norlin (April 1, 1871 – March 31, 1942) was president of the University of Colorado. During his tenure as president, Norlin oversaw the redesign of the campus in Boulder, Colorado.

== Early life and education ==
Norlin was born in Concordia, in Cloud County, Kansas, the son of Gustaf Wilhelm Norlin (1821–1911) and Valborg Fahnehielm Norlin (1832–1887), both Swedish immigrants who arrived in the United States in 1869. He moved to Fish Creek, Wisconsin with his family in 1879. Norlin received his Bachelor of Arts in Greek from Hastings College in 1893. He worked as a Greek instructor there before studying at the University of Chicago, where he received a Ph.D. magna cum laude in Greek in 1900. He also attended the Sorbonne in Paris in 1902. Norlin was a member of Phi Beta Kappa and the Phi Gamma Delta fraternity.

== Academia ==
Professor Norlin taught Greek language and literature at the University of Colorado from April 1899 to 1917. He was named acting president of the University of Colorado in May 1917 when university president Livingston Farrand left for France to head the Rockefeller Foundation. Norlin was unanimously elected president on February 24, 1919 after Farrand resigned outright.

During his tenure as President of the University of Colorado, he oversaw the redesign of the Boulder campus under the plans of noted architect, Charles Zeller Klauder. The first building done in the university's distinctive Tuscan Vernacular Revival was completed in 1921. Fifteen other buildings in that style, including a men's and women's gymnasium, a student union, a fieldhouse, a library, and student dormitories, were built during Norlin's presidency.

Norlin is also remembered for resisting efforts by the Ku Klux Klan, which had taken control of the Colorado legislature in about 1922. The Klan insisted he dismiss all Catholic and Jewish faculty, but he resisted and guided the University through the years until 1926, when the Klan lost control of the legislature and governorship. During that period, the University subsisted on a millage built into the state constitution; its budget was cut to zero.

By appointment of Columbia University, Norlin spent the 1932–33 year as Theodore Roosevelt Professor of American Life and Institutions at the University of Berlin. After his time in Germany, he spoke and wrote articles warning of the dangers of Nazism and antisemitism. He was a Weil Lecturer at the University of North Carolina in 1934 and was also a trustee of the Carnegie Foundation for the Advancement of Teaching.

During Norlin's tenure, the University of Colorado saw its student population more than triple, from 1,278 in 1917 to 4,501 in 1939. After twenty years as university president, Norlin was set to retire on June 30, 1939. However, due to controversy over the appointment of his successor, Norlin remained president until Robert L. Stearns succeeded him on September 8, 1939.

== Personal life ==
George Norlin married Mildred "Minnie" Covert Deutcher on June 21, 1904 in Cleveland, Ohio. They had a daughter, Agnes (1905–1994). Norlin died in Boulder on March 31, 1942. He was predeceased by Minnie by 27 hours.

== Legacy ==
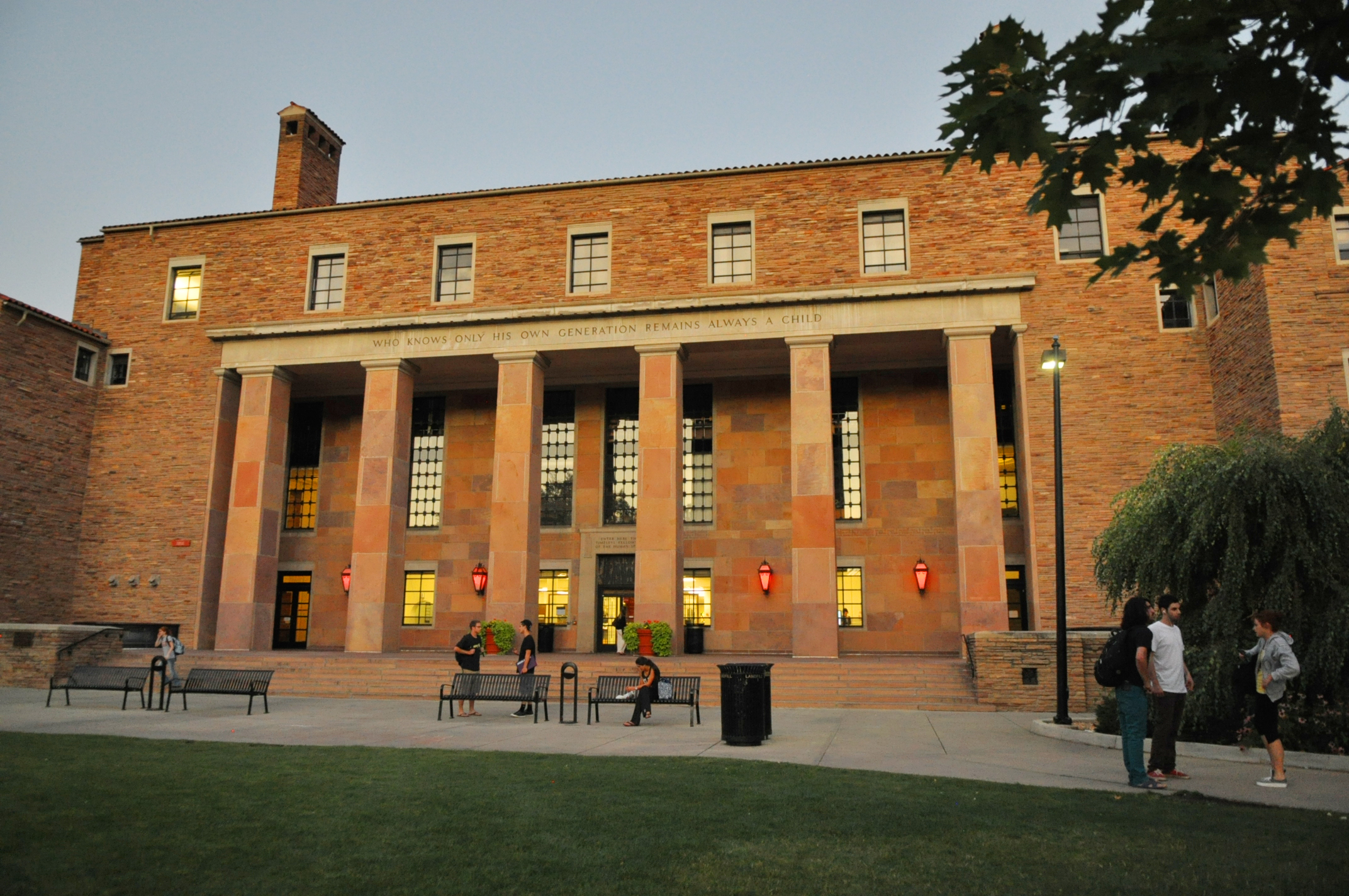
Norlin Library at the University of Colorado Boulder was named in honor of former president George Norlin.

The Norlin Library, located in the Norlin Quadrangle of the University of Colorado, was named in his honor in 1944. The University of Colorado at Boulder offers the Norlin Scholars Program for highly motivated students with excellent academic or creative ability. The George Norlin Award at the University of Colorado honors alumni of the University for distinguished lifetime achievement. Norlin's June 1935 commencement address, now known as the Norlin Charge, is still read to graduates at the University of Colorado's commencement ceremony.

== Selected works ==
- Fascism and Citizenship (Chapel Hill: The University of North Carolina Press, 1934)
- Integrity in Education and Other Papers (New York: The Macmillan Co., 1926)
- Isocrates in 3 volumes in Loeb Classical Library (Cambridge, Massachusetts: Harvard University Press): only Vol. 1 (1928) and Vol. 2 (1929); Vol. 3 published by Larue van Hook
- An Odious Comparison (Phi Beta Kappa Addresses, Columbia, Mo., 1917)
- The Quest of American Life (Boulder, Colo: University of Colorado, 1945)
- Things in the Saddle: Selected Essays and Addresses by George Norlin (Cambridge, Massachusetts: Harvard University Press, 1940)

== Other sources ==
- Benson, Adolph B.; Naboth Hedin Swedes In America (New York: Haskel House Publishers. 1969)
- Ellsworth, Ralph E. (editor) A Voice from Colorado's past for the present : selected writings of George Norlin (Boulder, Colo. : Colorado Associated University Press, c1985)
