= James Baker (university president) =

American academic (1848–1925)

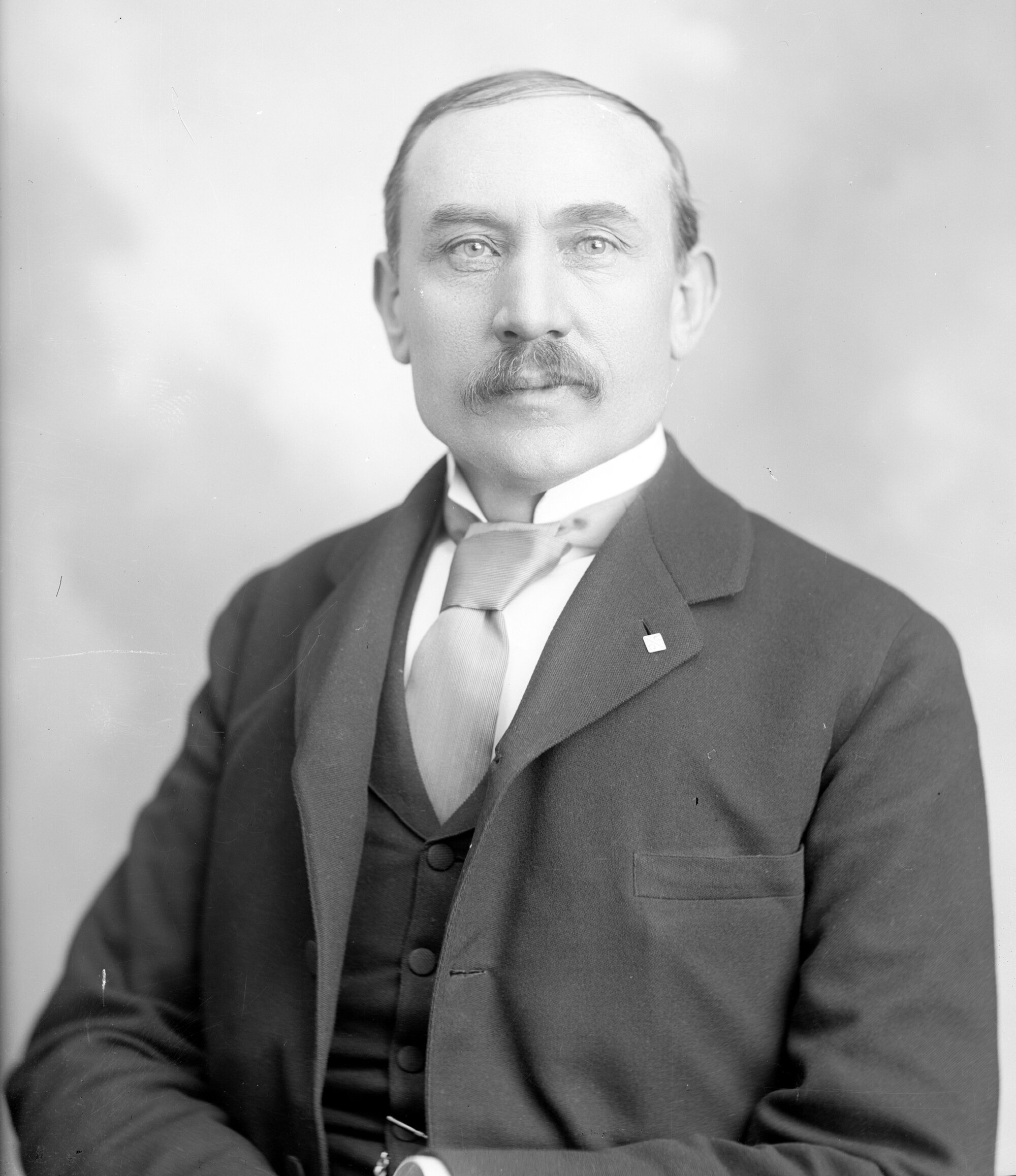

President of the University of Colorado
- In office May 21, 1892 – January 1, 1914
- Preceded by: Horace M. Hale
- Succeeded by: Livingston Farrand

Personal details
- Born: James Hutchins Baker; October 13, 1848 Harmony, Maine, U.S.
- Died: September 10, 1925 (aged 76) Denver, Colorado, U.S.
- Spouse: Jennie Hilton (m. 1882)
- Education: Bates College (A.B.)

James Hutchins Baker (1848–1925) was an American academic administrator who served as the president of the University of Colorado from 1892 to 1914.

== Biography ==
Born on October 13, 1848, in Harmony, Maine, James Baker attended Bates College in Lewiston before becoming the principal of Yarmouth High School in Yarmouth. He moved to Denver, Colorado in 1875 and worked in secondary school administration until 1891.

He served as the president of the University of Colorado from May 21, 1892 to January 1, 1914.

He was a member of several prominent educational associations, including the Committee of Ten which convened in 1892 to evaluate practices in American high schools and make recommendations for changes.

His Elementary Psychology (1890) was widely used as a textbook in high schools and normal schools.

== Personal life ==
He married Jennie Hilton on June 20, 1882, having two children.

James Baker died from pneumonia in Denver on September 10, 1925. He was buried in Fairmount Cemetery.

== Publications ==
- Elementary Psychology (1890).
- Review of the Report of the Committee of Ten (1894)
- University Ideals (1897)
- American University Progress and College Reform Relative to School and Society (1916)
- After the War—what? (1918)
- Of Himself and Other Things (1922)

== See also ==
- List of Bates College people
