= University of Colorado =

Public university system in the United States

Coordinates: 39.745196°N 104.983340°W

- Type: Public university system
- Established: 1876; 150 years ago
- Endowment: $2.25 billion (FY2024)
- President: Todd Saliman
- Location: Boulder, Colorado, United States
- Colors: (Gold, Black, and Grey)
- Website: cu.edu

Locations of University of Colorado campuses

The University of Colorado (CU) is a system of public universities in Colorado. It consists of four institutions: the University of Colorado Boulder, the University of Colorado Colorado Springs, the University of Colorado Denver, and the University of Colorado Anschutz. It is governed by an elected nine-member board of regents and led by a system president, currently Todd Saliman.

== Campuses ==
=== University of Colorado Boulder (CU Boulder) ===
CU Boulder is the flagship university of the University of Colorado System in Boulder, Colorado. Founded in 1876, the university has more than 39,000 undergraduate and graduate students, making it the largest university in Colorado by enrollment. It offers more than 2,500 courses in more than 150 areas of study through its nine colleges and schools. Their athletic program is part of the Big XII Conference of NCAA Division I.

=== University of Colorado Colorado Springs (UCCS) ===
UCCS is the fastest growing of the three campuses with an undergraduate and graduate student population of about 12,000 students. It was established in 1965 and now offers 45 bachelor's, 22 master's, and five doctoral degree programs through its six colleges. The 520-acre campus is located in central Colorado Springs. Their athletic program is part of the Rocky Mountain Athletic Conference of NCAA Division II.

=== University of Colorado Denver (CU Denver) ===
CU Denver is the largest research university in Colorado, attracting more than $420 million in research annually, and granting more master's degrees than any other institution in Colorado. The campus provides an urban learning center with liberal arts, sciences, and professional programs in eight schools and colleges, serving over 18,000 students. CU Denver is located in downtown Denver on the Auraria Campus, which is also home to Metropolitan State University of Denver and Community College of Denver.

=== University of Colorado Anschutz (CU Anschutz) ===
CU Anschutz in Aurora is home to six professional schools in the health sciences and extensive research and clinical care facilities, including the University of Colorado Hospital, Children's Hospital Colorado and the Anschutz Health and Wellness Center. CU Anschutz has more than 4,200 students, and is the largest academic health center in the Rocky Mountain region of the United States. It was established in 2006.

== Defunct campuses ==
=== University of Colorado South Denver (CU South Denver) ===
CU South Denver, located in Lone Tree, opened in 2015 as a satellite campus of CU Denver, but permanently closed in August 2021 due to the COVID-19 pandemic and concerns surrounding the campus' financial viability. At the time of its closing, the campus offered four academic programs and served nearly 300 students.

== Related institutions ==
- The University of Colorado Hospital Authority (UC Health) was created in 1991 to allow the Regents to reorganize the University of Colorado Hospital.

== International collaboration ==
The university is an active member of the University of the Arctic. UArctic is an international cooperative network based in the Circumpolar Arctic region, consisting of more than 200 universities, colleges, and other organizations with an interest in promoting education and research in the Arctic region.

== Presidents ==
The following persons have served as president of the University of Colorado system:

No.	Image	President	Term start	Term end	Ref.
1		Joseph A. Sewall	1877	1887	
2		Horace M. Hale	1887	1892	
3		James H. Baker	1892	1914	
4		Livingston Farrand	1914	1919	
5		George Norlin	1919	1939	
6		Robert L. Stearns	1939	1953	
7		Ward Darley	1953	1956	
8		J. Quigg Newton	1956	1963	
9		Joseph R. Smiley	1963	1969	
interim 10		Eugene H. Wilson	1969	1969	
11		Frederick P. Thieme	1969	1974	
12		Roland C. Rautenstraus	1974	1980	
13		Arnold R. Weber	1980	1985	
interim 14		William H. Baughn	1985	1985	
15		E. Gordon Gee	1985	1990	
interim 16		William H. Baughn	1990	1991	
17		Judith E. N. Albino (Note: First woman president.)	1991	November 15, 1995	
interim		John C. Buechner	November 16, 1995	May 1996	
18		John C. Buechner	May 1996	May 31, 2000 (Note: Forced to resign due to conflicts with regents.)	
interim 19		Alexander E. Bracken	June 1, 2000	August 31, 2000	
20		Elizabeth Hoffman	September 1, 2000	June 30, 2005 (Note: Resigned as a result over football scandal.)	
interim		Hank Brown	August 1, 2005	May 11, 2006	
21		Hank Brown	May 11, 2006	March 7, 2008	
22		Bruce D. Benson	March 10, 2008	June 30, 2019	
23		Mark Kennedy	July 1, 2019	June 30, 2021	
interim		Todd Saliman	July 1, 2021	April 27, 2022	
24		Todd Saliman	April 27, 2022	present	

Table notes:

== See also ==
- Sommers–Bausch Observatory
