= Office of Net Assessment =

Department of Defense threat assessment group

The Office of Net Assessment (ONA) is an agency of the United States Department of Defense created in 1973 by Richard Nixon to serve as the Pentagon's "internal think tank" that "looks 20 to 30 years into the military's future, often with the assistance of outside contractors, and produces reports on the results of its research". The office was temporarily abolished by Secretary of Defense Pete Hegseth in 2025, before being restored with a reduced budget.

== Function ==
According to Defense Directive 5111.11, the Director shall develop and coordinate net assessments of the standing, trends, and future prospects of U.S. military capabilities and military potential in comparison with those of other countries or groups of countries in order to identify emerging or future threats or opportunities for the United States. Paul Bracken explains that it is important to have a good grasp of net assessment because it is an "important part of the language spoken by leaders in the higher levels of DOD" and officers who lack familiarity "will be at a disadvantage in communicating with the civilian leadership".

== List of directors ==
The Director of Net Assessment was the principal staff assistant and advisor to the Secretary and Deputy Secretary of Defense on net assessment. Andrew Marshall was named its first director, a position he continued to hold under succeeding administrations. In October 2014, Marshall announced plans to retire in January 2015. He was replaced by Jim Baker in May 2015.

- Andrew Marshall, 1973 – January 2, 2015
- James H. Baker, May 14, 2015 – March 13, 2025

== Notable staff ==
Staff members have included:

- Andrew F. Krepinevich, Jr., formerly the president of the Center for Strategic and Budgetary Assessments
- James G. Roche, Secretary of the Air Force in the George W. Bush administration
- Larry Seaquist, recently a member of Washington State's House of Representatives
- David S. Yost
