= Judiciary of Colorado =

Institutions exercising judicial power in Colorado

The Judiciary of Colorado is established and authorized by Article VI of the Colorado Constitution as well as the law of Colorado. The various courts include the Colorado Supreme Court, Colorado Court of Appeals, Colorado district courts (for each of the 22 judicial districts), Colorado county courts (for each of Colorado's 64 counties), Colorado water courts, and municipal courts. The administration of the state judicial system is the responsibility of the Chief Justice of the Colorado Supreme Court as its executive head and is assisted by several other commissions. In Denver, the county and municipal courts are integrated and administratively separate from the state court system.

== Courts ==
Colorado courts include the:

- Colorado Supreme Court,
- Colorado Court of Appeals,
- Colorado district courts,
- Colorado county courts,
- Colorado water courts,
- and municipal courts.

All of the courts above, other than municipal courts and Denver's county court, are part of the state court system. In Denver, county courts and municipal courts are integrated and are not part of the state court system for administrative purposes, and the Denver Probate Court and the Denver Juvenile Court have jurisdiction over probate and juvenile matters, respectively. Outside Denver, these matters are within the jurisdiction of the district courts.

=== Supreme Court ===
The Colorado Supreme Court is the state supreme court, the state's highest appellate court. The Supreme Court consists of chief justice (currently Monica M. Márquez) and six associate justices.

=== Court of Appeals ===
The Colorado Court of Appeals is the state intermediate appellate court. It has jurisdiction primarily over final judgments of district courts acting as trial courts, and of approximately 33 kinds of an administrative agency or board determinations. It is bypassed in the case of death penalty appeals, cases in which a lower court has declared a law or ordinance to be unconstitutional, appeals from Public Utilities Commission decisions, certain appeals related to the initiative process, appeals from water courts, interlocutory relief, and the further appeal of cases already appealed from a county or municipal court to a district court judge, all of which are appealed directly to the Colorado Supreme Court. Unlike the other state courts, this court is a creature of statute and not mandated by the state constitution. There is a single geographical division of the Colorado Court of Appeals co-located in the same courthouse with the Colorado Supreme Court in Denver that handles all intermediate appellate court cases statewide. The Colorado Court of Appeals does not have any internal subject-matter divisions. It hears cases in panels of three judges, but it does not have an "en banc" review of panel decisions as the federal United States courts of appeals do.

=== District courts ===
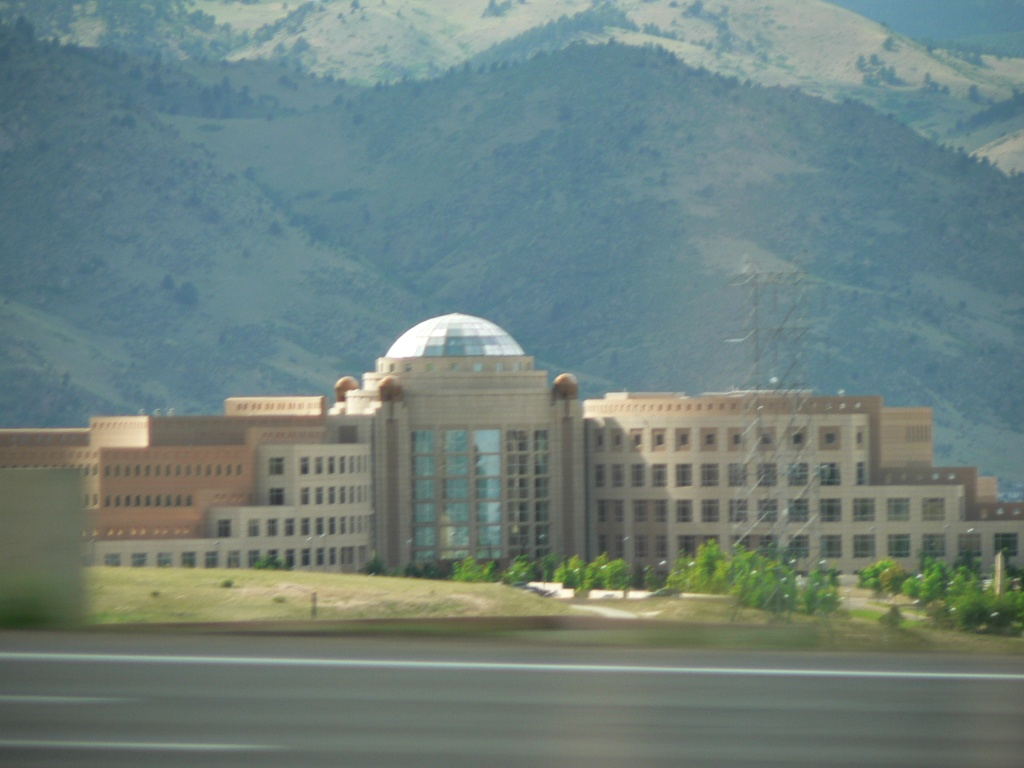
The Jefferson County Courthouse.

The Colorado district courts are the state trial courts of general jurisdiction. There are 22 judicial districts in the state, which include one or more of Colorado's 64 counties. They have original jurisdiction in civil cases with any amount in controversy; felony criminal cases, domestic relations, family law, and cases involving minor cases (including adoption, dependency, juvenile delinquency, and paternity actions), probate, and mental health cases. Court filings in district court generally indicate the county within the district in which the action is filed and the district court generally conducts proceedings in that action in that county.

=== County courts ===
Colorado county courts are courts of limited jurisdiction. There is one county court in each of the 64 counties, including the consolidated city-counties of Denver and Broomfield. They hear misdemeanour cases, preliminary hearings in felony cases, evictions, civil cases not involving ownership of real property with an amount in controversy up to $25,000, and several other narrowly defined types of cases such as name changes and temporary restraining orders.

=== Municipal courts ===
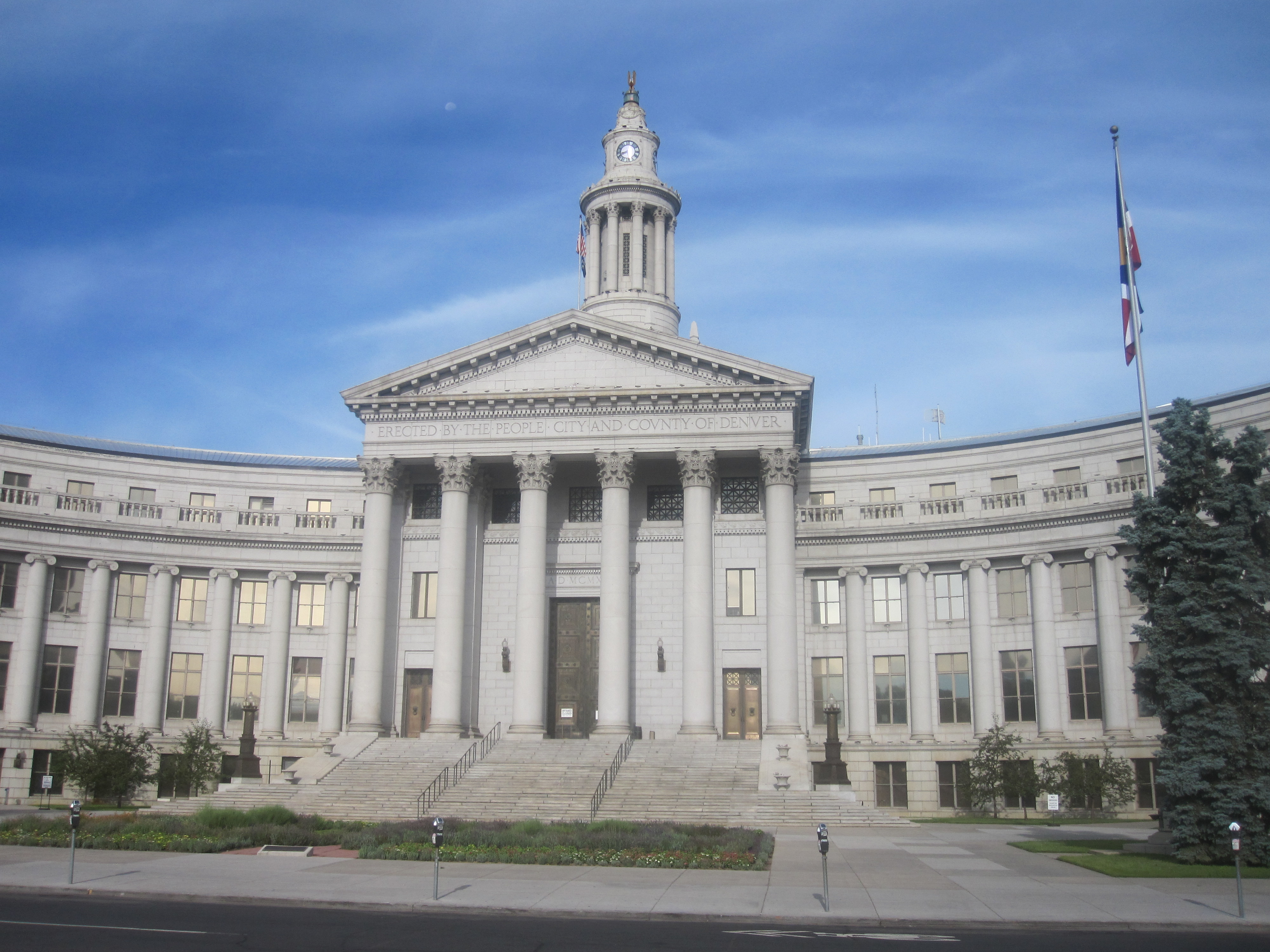
The City and County Building of Denver.

In some municipalities of Colorado, there are municipal courts, which are not part of the state court system. Municipal court jurisdiction is limited to municipal ordinance cases, including traffic violations imposed under municipal ordinances rather than state statutes, which have maximum penalties similar to those of state law petty offences. These courts have no statutory jurisdiction over other classes of cases, although municipal courts do have inherent procedural powers associated with their status as a court, such as contempt of court powers and powers related to the calling and compensation of jurors. Some municipal courts are courts of record that can impose greater sanctions for ordinance violations and are subject to appellate review like state courts. Other municipal courts are courts not of record, which can impose only less severe sanctions for ordinance violations, whose decisions are appealed through trials de novo in the appellate court. A small number of municipal courts in Colorado have been granted civil jurisdiction in certain ordinance cases, such as cases involving land use, under municipal home rule powers, in addition to quasi-criminal jurisdiction.

=== Water courts ===
The state's seven Colorado water courts have exclusive subject-matter jurisdiction over adjudications of water rights. Established in 1969, there are seven water courts in each of Colorado's seven major river basins: South Platte, Arkansas, Rio Grande, Gunnison, Colorado, White, and San Juan. Water courts are presided over by district court judges who have simultaneously been given responsibility for water court cases in each of the state's seven drainage basins. The water courts are divisions of the district courts in that basin and use the district court's accessories, and water judges are districted court judges appointed by the Colorado Supreme Court.

=== Other tribunals ===
Colorado's state government also has several executive branch administrative law courts and independent tribunals outside the judicial branch. Some of the most notable of these are the administrative law judges handling election law violations in the Colorado Secretary of State's office, the Public Utilities Commission when it acts in a quasi-judicial manner, unemployment-insurance hearing officers, administrative law judges handling motor vehicle license revocations, quasi-judicial municipal land use boards, professional regulatory boards, and an Independent Ethics Commission. The Colorado Office of Administrative Courts is Colorado's centralized administrative court system, whose administrative law judges decides workers' compensation, human services, licensing, and a variety of other cases.

== Administration ==
The judicial branch is headed by the Colorado Supreme Court, the state supreme court. The Colorado Supreme Court selects the Chief Justice of the Colorado Supreme Court from its membership who is the executive head of the judicial system. In addition to its role as the state's highest appellate court, the Colorado Supreme Court supervises the state court system and the state's lawyers.

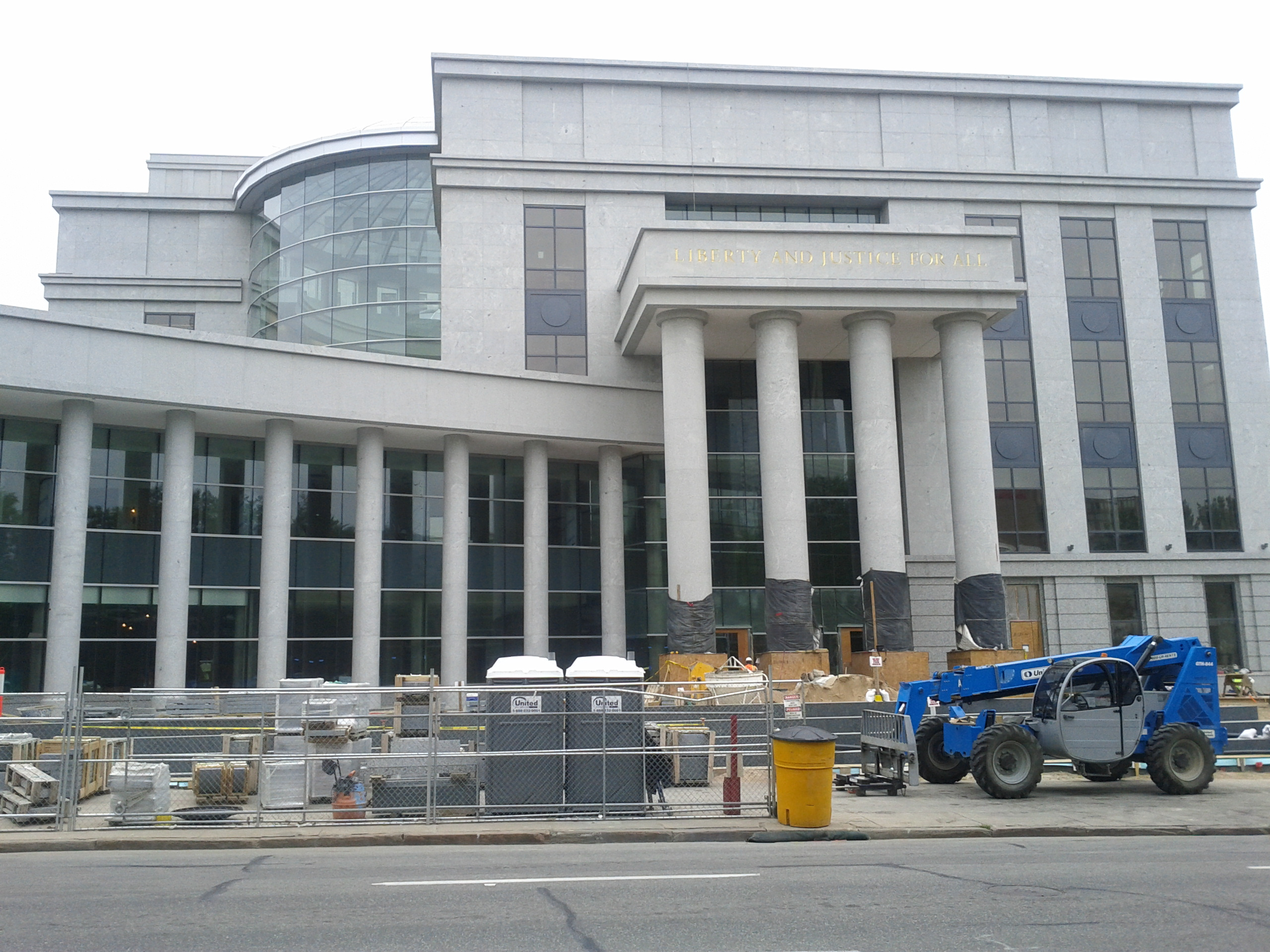
The Ralph L. Carr Judicial Center in Denver, housing the Supreme Court, Court of Appeals, Attorney General, State Public Defender, and court administrators.

The Colorado Bar Association, the Denver Bar Association, and the Colorado Criminal Defense Bar are examples of voluntary bar associations in Colorado.

The Integrated Colorado Courts E-Filing System (ICCES) is the electronic court filing system. There is no official reporter. The Colorado Reporter (a Colorado-specific version of the Pacific Reporter) is an unofficial reporter for appellate decisions from 1883. Decisions of the Colorado Supreme Court were published in the official Colorado Reports from 1864 to 1980, and decisions of the Court of Appeals were published in the official Colorado Court of Appeals Reports from 1891 to 1980.

== Personnel ==
=== Judges ===
When vacancies occurs on the Supreme Court, Court of Appeals, district court, or county court, a judicial nominating commission recommends to the governor three (for appellate courts) and two or three (for trial courts) qualified candidates to fill the vacancy. The governor appoints a judge from the commission's list. All judges are subject to retention elections. The appointment and retention of municipal court judges is governed by municipal ordinance. All or almost all municipal judges are appointed. Denver County Court judges are appointed by the mayor from choices presented by a blue ribbon merit selection committee, and subject to retention elections in the same manner as state court system county court judges.

The Colorado Supreme Court Nominating Commission recommends candidates to fill vacancies on the Supreme Court and Court of Appeals. For the district courts and county courts, a judicial district nominating commission in each of the 22 judicial districts recommends candidates to the Governor of Colorado for consideration and appointment. The Denver County Court Judicial Nomination Commission recommends candidates to the Mayor of Denver to fill vacancies on the Denver County Court.

Appellate judges, district court judges, Denver Probate Court judges, juvenile court judges and county court judges in larger counties are required to be lawyers. County court judges in smaller counties are not required to be lawyers, but currently, there are no more than three non-lawyer state judges in Colorado out of 130 county court judgeships, all of whom are part-time, and at least two of whom are college-educated. Preference in hiring municipal judges must be given to lawyers. Municipal judges in courts of record must be lawyers, while municipal judges in courts not of record need not to be lawyers. In practice, all of the larger municipalities in Colorado have municipal courts of record with judges who are lawyers. Many municipal judges who are lawyers serve on multiple municipal courts and/or are part-time county court judges.

In Colorado, judges can be removed by legislative impeachment, by the voters in a retention election, or for cause by the Colorado Supreme Court on the advice of the Colorado Judicial Conduct Commission. After two years in office, and then after the expiration of each full term in office, judges are subject to retention elections in which voters can choose to retain or not retain a judge. The vast majority (about 99 per cent) of judges are retained by voters. State committees make recommendations to voters on the retention of judges distributed in booklet form with partial justifications before each judicial retention election. Voters have never voted not to retain an appellate judge in the forty years that the system has been in place. Voters tend to not retain judges only when there is a well-publicized scandal and usually also a recommendation from a state committee that a judge not be retained. Colorado judges are not subject to recall elections.

Judges may also be impeached by the legislature (a very rare occurrence) and are monitored by a judicial discipline commission. Many complaints about judges found by the judicial discipline commission to warrant further investigation are resolved when the judge involved retires, rendering the investigation moot. Removal from office is mandatory in the case of felonies and "crimes of moral turpitude" of which a judge is convicted. The mandatory retirement age for judges in Colorado is seventy-two years of age. The Colorado Commission on Judicial Discipline investigates allegations that a judge is not properly performing their official duties because of willful misconduct, ethical violations, or a permanent disabling health condition. The Commission may take various actions to remedy improper conduct including simply meeting with the judge, privately or publicly reprimanding the judge, or recommending that the Supreme Court remove a judge from office. In an appropriate case, the Commission also may place a judge on disability retirement. The Denver County Court Judicial Discipline Commission considers complaints regarding the conduct of Denver County Court judges.

=== Magistrates ===
County court magistrates and district court magistrates may be appointed. County court magistrates can hear misdemeanor traffic offenses and civil infractions. District court magistrates do similarly in district court.

=== Prosecutors ===
Most crimes in Colorado are prosecuted by a district attorney. One district attorney is elected for each of the state's 22 judicial districts in a partisan election. The state attorney general also has the power to prosecute certain crimes. In rare circumstances, a special prosecutor may be appointed to prosecute a crime on a case by case basis. Municipal ordinance violations are prosecuted by city attorneys.

=== Public defenders ===
The indigent accused in Colorado is represented by the Colorado State Public Defender.

Sexual Harassment

Sexual harassment has been reported as a widespread issue involving staff at Colorado Judicial Branch. This has been reported by media agencies such as The Denver Post. In 2024, a probation department in the branch fired an officer who reported an assault by a coworker, in which the police stated included “stalking both in and outside of work.”

== Law ==
=== Procedure ===
With certain exceptions, appeals of rights from districts courts, the Denver Probate Court and the Denver Juvenile Court are to the Colorado Court of Appeals. There are certain exceptions, in which an appeal of right lies directly to the Colorado Supreme Court. These include capital punishment cases, cases where a law is found to be unconstitutional by a district court, water court cases and discretionary review following county or municipal court appeals of right. The Colorado Court of Appeals also has jurisdiction over appeals directly from certain state administrative bodies.

Most appeals from county courts, municipal courts and quasi-judicial local decision making bodies are made to a district court. All appeals other than appeals of right, including most appeals before a final judgment in civil cases, are to the Colorado Supreme Court.

== Law enforcement ==
Supervision of convicted criminals on probation is a responsibility of the judicial branch. Jails for individuals awaiting conviction or sentencing, convicted of misdemeanors, petty offenses, or ordinance violations, and for convicted felons awaiting transfers to state prison, are operated by county sheriffs. Prisons for adults and supervision of individuals on parole are the responsibility of the state government through the state department of corrections. Incarceration of juvenile and certain mentally ill offenders are also the responsibility of the state government.

== History ==
Colorado once had superior courts but they were merged into the district courts effective November 14, 1986. References to "small claims court" in Colorado are to a subdivision of county court.

== See also ==
- Government of Colorado
