= Courts of Colorado =

Courts of Colorado include:

State courts of Colorado

- Colorado Supreme Court
  - Colorado Court of Appeals
    - Colorado District Courts (22 judicial districts)
      - Colorado County Courts

Federal courts located in Colorado

- United States Court of Appeals for the Tenth Circuit (headquartered in Denver, having jurisdiction over the United States District Courts of Colorado, Kansas, New Mexico, Oklahoma, Utah, and Wyoming)
  - United States District Court for the District of Colorado

== See also ==
- Judiciary of Colorado
