= Was Justice Denied? =

- Directed by: Paul Jay
- Narrated by: Miguel Ferrer
- Country of origin: United States
- Original language: English

Production
- Running time: 90 mins

Original release
- Release: June 20, 2000

Was Justice Denied? is an American television special that aired on TNT on June 20, 2000. The special was narrated by Miguel Ferrer.

== Overview ==
The show features Burton Roberts, Charlie Stone and Jeralyn Merritt, as they reviewed the facts surrounding the 1996 conviction of Dale Helmig for the murder of his 55-year-old mother, Norma, who was found floating in the Osage River in Linn, Missouri. The second case involved the 1992 conviction of Beverly Monroe for the shooting death of her wealthy, long-time lover, 60-year-old art collector Roger de la Burde in Powhatan, Virginia.
