= Grebner =

Grebner is a surname. Notable people with the surname include:

- Georgiy Grebner (born 1954), Soviet screenwriter
- Mark Grebner (born 1952), American politician, attorney, and political consultant
- Paul Grebner (fl. 1560–1590), German schoolteacher and author
