= Marcy Wheeler =

American journalist

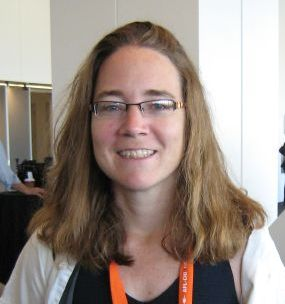
- Wheeler in 2009
- Other names: emptywheel
- Education: Amherst College (BA); University of Michigan (MA, PhD)
- Occupation: Independent journalist
- Years active: 2007–present
- Notable work: Anatomy of Deceit: How the Bush Administration Used the Media to Sell the Iraq War and Out a Spy (2007)
- Website: emptywheel.net

Marcy Wheeler, long known by the handle "emptywheel", a nickname derived from "M. T. Wheeler", is a liberal American independent journalist specializing in national security and civil liberties. Wheeler publishes on her own site, Emptywheel, established in July 2011. She has reported on United States v. Libby (the trial of I. Lewis "Scooter" Libby) and the investigation of President Donald Trump's connections to Russia, among other national security matters. Wheeler received a 2009 Sidney Hillman Foundation Journalism Award.

== Early life ==
Wheeler grew up with parents who worked for IBM. Wheeler is a 1990 graduate of Amherst College where she was awarded a B.A.. With an interest in the way businesses use language, Wheeler worked for the next five years in corporate consulting, specifically teaching employees to compose large documents.

For graduate school, she moved from her native New York City in 1995 to Ann Arbor, Michigan. Wheeler earned both her M.A. and in 2000, her Ph.D. in comparative literature from the University of Michigan. Her dissertation was on the feuilleton, a literary-journalistic essay form she described as often self-published. In her online "Prologue" to Anatomy of Deceit, Wheeler observes that the feuilleton essay is an important medium for expressing opinions that might ordinarily be censored due to government displeasure, citing recent examples such as those by former Czechoslovak dissident Václav Havel, who later served for a period as president of the country.

== Career ==
Wheeler makes occasional contributions to the commentary and analysis sections of The Guardian, Daily Kos, The Huffington Post, Democracy Now!, and Michigan Liberal. She was published on The Next Hurrah, and many of Wheeler's 2007 blog entries there focused on the congressional hearings into the dismissal of eight U.S. attorneys subsequent to the November 2006 U.S. midterm election.

Between early December 2007 and July 2011 Wheeler published primarily on Jane Hamsher's FireDogLake. During United States v. Libby, the trial of I. Lewis "Scooter" Libby, Wheeler reported on the testimony as one of the few press-accredited bloggers allowed in the courtroom. In her account, she describes her entries as "not a transcript"; nevertheless, such eye-witness accounts by bloggers served as sources of reliable information about the trial for readers. During the trial, Wheeler appeared on camera in video reports posted online on PoliticsTV.com along with other accredited Libby trial blogger-correspondents such as FiredogLake creator Jane Hamsher, FiredogLake principal blogger Christy Hardin Smith, and TalkLeft creator Jeralyn Merritt. In his column-blog White House Watch, published in The Washington Post, Dan Froomkin cited the efforts of FiredogLake in live-blogging the Libby trial as "essential reading" (page 3).

Wheeler held an unpaid, part-time position as "senior policy analyst" at The Intercept for several months after its February 2014 launch. She has described that period as a difficult experience during a "chaotic time" at the organization. In particular, she came into conflict with editor-in-chief John Cook, who refused to pay for her work and expertise, was reluctant to publish what she believed was an important surveillance story, and excluded her from the first meeting of all staff reporters—which she construed as Cook's opinion that she was not a worthy journalist. Consequently, she resigned.

Wheeler became a witness in Special Counsel Robert Mueller's investigation of possible connections to Russia regarding the election of Donald Trump because she had revealed one of her sources to the FBI in 2017. Wheeler stated that she had "concrete evidence he was lying to [her]" and that her source was "doing serious harm to innocent people".

She campaigned for Democratic presidential candidate Howard Dean in 2004, and is a former vice chairwoman of the Washtenaw County Democratic Party.

== Personal life ==
Wheeler is married to an engineer and lives in Limerick, Ireland.

== Bibliography ==
- Wheeler, Marcy (2007). Anatomy of Deceit: How the Bush Administration Used the Media to Sell the Iraq War and Out a Spy. Berkeley: Vaster Books [Dist. by Publishers Group West]. ISBN 978-0-9791761-0-4.
