= Colorado county courts =

Colorado county courts are state trial courts of limited jurisdiction in the U.S. state of Colorado.

There is one county court in each of Colorado's 64 counties. The county courts hear civil cases with an amount in controversy not in excess of $25,000, misdemeanors, traffic infractions, felony complaints (which may be sent to district court), protection orders, and small claims.

The district courts, which are the state's trial courts of general jurisdiction, have appellate jurisdiction over the county courts. (That is, decisions of the county courts may be appealed to district court). Unlike a common practice where appeals are reviewed by a panel of at least three judges, the Colorado district courts act in dual capacity (i.e. as trial courts and as appellate courts), thus each appeal is decided by a single judge. Per C.R.S. 13-6-310(4) further appeal cannot be reviewed by the Court of Appeals, and is only upon writ of certiorari issued in the discretion of Colorado Supreme Court.

There are currently 114 county court judges, excluding the 17 Denver County Court judges appointed by the Mayor of Denver.

== See also ==
- Judiciary of Colorado
- Government of Colorado
- Law of Colorado
