= Research 2000 =

Opinion polling and marketing research company

- Industry: Marketing research
- Founded: 1999
- Headquarters: Olney, Maryland
- Key people: Del Ali (President)
- Services: opinion polling

Research 2000 was a U.S. opinion polling and marketing research company based in Olney, Maryland. It began doing research on upcoming elections in 1999 after its President, Del Ali, moved on from Mason-Dixon Political Media Research. Research 2000 clients included KCCI-TV in Des Moines, Iowa;, WCAX-TV in Burlington, Vermont; WISC-TV in Madison, Wisconsin; WKYT-TV in Lexington, Kentucky; Lee Enterprises, the Concord Monitor, The Florida Times-Union, WSBT-TV/WISH-TV/WANE-TV in Indiana, the St. Louis Post-Dispatch, the Bergen Record, the Reno Gazette-Journal, and the political blog Daily Kos.

== Daily Kos lawsuit ==
During the 2008 U.S. elections, Research 2000 was contracted by the Democratic-leaning blog Daily Kos to conduct nonpartisan polling of various races, including presidential, senate and gubernatorial races. This partnership was slated to continue into the 2010 U.S. elections. However, Daily Kos terminated the relationship in early June 2010 after FiveThirtyEight's pollster rankings showed Research 2000 had underperformed compared to other pollsters.

In June 2010, three independent amateur statisticians (Mark Grebner, Michael Weissman, and Jonathan Weissman) began investigating Research 2000's numbers and suspected that they had been fabricated. They were concerned enough to contact Daily Kos founder Markos Moulitsas with their suspicions. On June 29, Daily Kos released the findings of that investigation, which concluded Research 2000's data showed extreme statistical anomalies inconsistent with random polling. In a statement of his own accompanying the results, Moulitsas renounced all of the work Research 2000 had done for Daily Kos and also announced that Daily Kos intended to sue the polling firm for fraud. Daily Kos lawyer Adam Bonin claimed Research 2000 "handed us fiction and told us it was fact." The suit was filed on June 30, 2010 in the U.S. District Court, Northern District of California.

On July 8, 2010, Research 2000 redirected its business website to the Wikipedia entry for opinion polls. Del Ali said he did so because "hackers have polluted the site".

On November 30, 2010, an agreement to a settlement began as lawyers for the Plaintiff filed a status report indicating that both parties were in "agreement as to the contours of a proper settlement but are still in the process of determining whether the execution of the proposed terms is feasible." In May 2011, The Huffington Post reported that the lawsuit had been settled with Research 2000 pollster Del Ali making payments to Daily Kos. In July 2012, however, a default judgement of over US$350,000 was entered against the defendant.
