= Kevin Gosztola =

American journalist, author

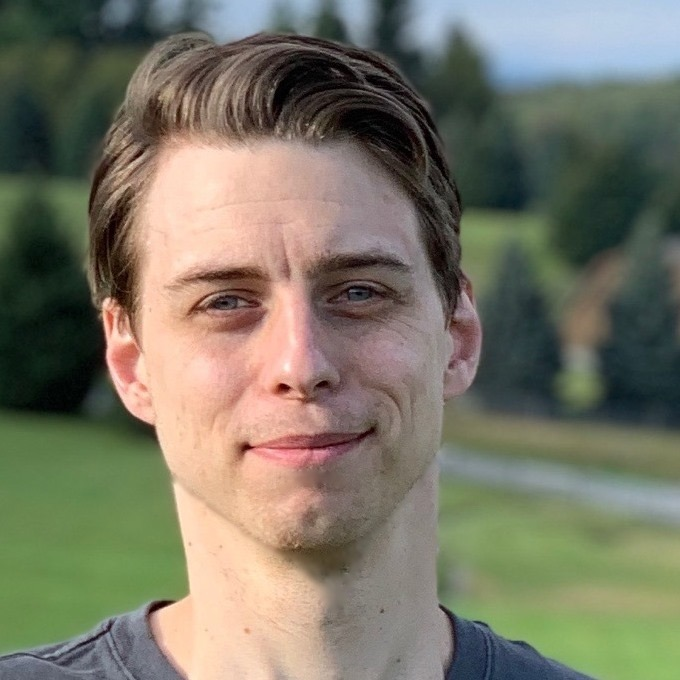
- Born: March 10, 1988 (age 38); Mishawaka, Indiana, U.S.
- Education: Columbia College Chicago
- Occupation: Writer
- Known for: Documenting the intersection of technology and individual rights
- Notable work: Truth and Consequences: The US vs. Bradley Manning

Kevin Gosztola (US: /ɡɒˈstʊlə/; born March 10, 1988) is an American journalist, author and YouTuber known for work on whistleblower cases, WikiLeaks, national security, and civil liberties. Formerly the managing editor of Shadowproof, he writes for The Dissenter. Previously, The Dissenter was part of Firedoglake (FDL). Gosztola has covered the court-martial of Chelsea Manning, the case of John Kiriakou, and the extradition of Julian Assange.

== Background ==
Gosztola is from Mishawaka, Indiana, and graduated from Columbia College Chicago with a degree in film in 2010.

== Career ==
Gosztola has written for The Nation, Salon, and OpEdNews. He co-authored, with Greg Mitchell, Truth and Consequences: The US vs. Bradley Manning. Since 2014, Gosztola has co-hosted, with Rania Khalek, the podcast Unauthorized Disclosure. Gosztola has been interviewed on Democracy Now!, The Real News, CounterSpin, Frontline, The Young Turks, and other shows and media outlets. He was one of few journalists to cover the Manning trial extensively, along with independent journalists Alexa O'Brien and Nathan Fuller, and a handful of reporters from The Guardian and the AP. He worked as an intern and videographer at The Nation before joining Firedoglake.

In December 2014, Firedoglake founder Jane Hamsher suspended operations indefinitely although parts of FDL, such as The Dissenter, continued. In August 2015, its tradition and legacy were assumed by Shadowproof, with Gosztola as managing editor.

Gosztola's book in defense of still-incarcerated Julian Assange, Guilty of Journalism: The Political Case Against Julian Assange, was released in March 2023.

In mid-December 2023, Gosztola and Shadowproof co-founder Brian Nam-Sonenstein announced the end of Shadowproof, although they planned to maintain the website content for posterity.

== Personal life ==
Gosztola lives with his wife in Chicago.
