= Firedoglake =

American political blog

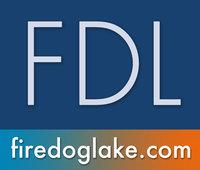
- Website type: Political blog
- Available in: English
- Creator: Jane Hamsher
- Website: firedoglake.com
- Commercial: Yes
- Launched: 2004
- Current status: Inactive

Firedoglake (abbreviated as FDL) was an American collaborative blog that described itself as a "leading progressive news site, online community, and action organization". Established by film producer Jane Hamsher in 2004, Firedoglake served as a platform for Hamsher, other writers and commenters to engage in debate and activism. Hamsher shut down Firedoglake on August 1, 2015, citing health reasons, and announced that all posts would be archived at the Shadowproof website, which was launched that year by former staff members. Shadowproof describes itself as "a press organization driven to expose systemic abuses of power in business and government while developing a model for independent journalism that supports a diverse range of young freelance writers and contributors."

== History ==
In December 2004, Hamsher founded the blog Firedoglake, naming it after her favorite activity at the time, sitting by the fire with her dog while watching Los Angeles Lakers games. Then published on Blogger.com, Firedoglake won a 2005 Koufax Award for "Best Series" for its detailed coverage of the Plame affair, while being in close contention for "Best New Blog" and "Best Group Blog".

In late 2005, Hamsher expanded FDL into a group blog, featuring such regular contributors as Christy Hardin Smith (aka "Reddhead"), Marcy Wheeler (aka "emptywheel"), "TRex", "Pachacutec", and "Siun", later joined by others, and she published it utilizing WordPress, enabling moderated and filtered commenting. In 2008, in a profile of Hamsher published in the Washingtonian, she stated that "FireDogLake has about 20 people who write for it, maybe a dozen site administrators who watch what's happening on the blog."

== Components ==
=== Blogs ===
- Elections - blog by Jon Walker, FDL Elections is a blog about election coverage, political campaigns, and polling.
- MyFDL - MyFDL is the community site of progressive political blog Firedoglake. Anyone can participate by writing a diary, commenting on diaries, or joining groups to find other people in their areas.
- TBogg - Humorous/satirical blog written by Tom Boggioni, "A Somewhat Popular Blogger"
- Pam's House Blend - blog on women's, LGBT, and religious issues written by Pam Spaulding along with Autumn Sandeen and other regular contributors.
- Just Say Now - Just Say Now is a campaign for marijuana legalization, made of a transpartisan alliance of organizations seeking to reform our nation's drug laws.
- Dissenter - Dissenter is a Firedoglake blog curated by journalist Kevin Gosztola that covers civil liberties, digital freedom issues, including regular coverage of WikiLeaks, Chelsea Manning, and the US government's prosecution of whistleblowers. According to their About section, "the name also stems from the fact that the right to dissent is one of the most important civil liberties to defend in this country. As dissent becomes more and more objectionable to a government and society, a country becomes less free".
- Bytegeist - Launched in September 2012, Firedoglake's Bytegeist seeks to explore the intersection between politics, technology and laws.
- La Figa - blog by Lisa Derrick exploring the intersection of politics and popular culture

=== Other components ===
News Desk - News and analysis for the FDL community provided by David Dayen.

=== FDL Action ===
Formerly known as Campaign Silo, FDL Action is an explicitly activist portion of FDL which galvanizes readers for causes.

=== Blue America ===
Not related to the similarly named campaigns by ActBlue, Blue America attempts to recruit pro-single-payer health care citizens to run in as many legislative districts as possible.

=== FDL Book Salon ===
In 2006 Hamsher launched the FDL Sunday Book Salon, in which participants discuss recent books, usually non-fiction political books, with a standing invitation for the books' authors to take part. For two weeks, in late August and early September 2006, the topic of conversation was the book Conservatives Without Conscience, and participants included its author, John Dean; political and legal blogger and Salon columnist Glenn Greenwald; and former Ambassador Joe Wilson.

Today, the Book Salons generally operate on Saturdays and Sundays from 5 - 7 pm Eastern time (2 - 4 pm Pacific). Book Salon guests and hosts have covered virtually the entire gamut of political, economic, and contemporary thought. Past Book Salons and scheduled future Book Salons can all be reviewed at the Book Salon Front Page

=== FDL Books ===
On September 6, 2006, Hamsher announced a book imprint called FDL Books, later adding Vaster Books, in collaboration with Markos Moulitsas, founder of Daily Kos; its first release is a volume about the Valerie Plame affair by Firedoglake and Daily Kos contributor Marcy Wheeler ("emptywheel") entitled Anatomy of Deceit: How the Bush Administration Used the Media to Sell the Iraq War and Out a Spy (Berkeley: Vaster Books [Dist. by Publishers Group West], 2007). To finance the publication of Wheeler's book, Hamsher sought to raise $65,000 in donations at Firedoglake, ultimately raising $29,000 through PayPal contributions, according to the hyperlinked "dedicated fund-raising page" tracking results.

=== Regular features ===
Firedoglake has a number of daily and weekly posts from regular contributors within the FDL Community. Among these are:

- Late Night - Posts nightly at 11 pm Eastern (8 pm Pacific) from rotating group of hosts
- Late, Late Night - Posts nightly at 1 am Eastern (10 pm Pacific) Open thread for overnight comments where there is no set topic but the conversation travels where and how it may
- Pull Up A Chair - Posts at 8 am Eastern (5 am Pacific) on Saturday mornings. Rotating hosts with the only rule being staying away from political talk
- Sunday Talking Heads - Posts at 5 am Eastern (2 am Pacific) on Sunday mornings. Compilation post of guests and topics for the Sunday morning political talk shows.

== Activism ==
=== Libby trial coverage ===
Taking turns with Jeralyn Merritt of TalkLeft, Christy Hardin Smith (aka "Reddhead"), Marcy Wheeler (aka "emptywheel"), "Pachacutec", and Susan McIntosh (aka "egregious"), Hamsher live-blogged the Scooter Libby trial from the courtroom for Firedoglake, as she had applied for and been granted two press passes which they all shared to attend and report on the trial in Washington, D.C. The New York Times reporter Scott Shane observes: "With no audio or video feed permitted, the Firedoglake 'live blog' has offered the fullest, fastest public report available. Many mainstream journalists use it to check on the trial", and noted that "for blogs, the Libby trial marks a courthouse coming of age". Online donors contributed to defray FDL's trial coverage costs, including travel expenses of the live-bloggers and rental of a Washington, D.C., apartment, nicknamed "Plame House", which they shared.

=== U.S. Senate election in Connecticut, 2006 ===
Hamsher supported Ned Lamont in his successful run for the Democratic nomination in the 2006 U.S. Senate election in Connecticut, against ultimately successful incumbent senator Joe Lieberman, who ran independently as a third party candidate with the support of Connecticut for Lieberman. Although Hamsher was not on the campaign staff, she was among several bloggers who traveled with Lamont's campaign, and she promoted Lamont's candidacy and helped raise money for him through Firedoglake.

After Hamsher posted an image depicting Lieberman in superimposed blackface embracing Bill Clinton created from a graphically edited photograph of Lieberman and Clinton in her guest blog in The Huffington Post, she was publicly criticized by Lieberman's campaign and others for doing so. The Lieberman campaign objected publicly that it found the image offensive and racist, with Lieberman publicly calling the use of blackface in the image "one of the most disgusting and hurtful images that has been used in American history, it's deeply offensive to people of all colors, and it has absolutely no place in the political arena today" and demanding that Lamont prohibit Hamsher from traveling with his campaign and to refuse any money that she might have raised for him.

Questioned about the image and his campaign's connections to Hamsher, Lamont responded, "I don't know anything about the blogs. I'm not responsible for those. I have no comment on them", but a spokesman for Lamont was quoted in The Washington Post as calling the image "offensive and inappropriate". Hamsher removed the image after receiving a request from the Lamont campaign, later posting a statement on Firedoglake "apologiz[ing] to anyone who was genuinely offended by the choice of images", and criticizing Lieberman for using the controversy about the image to score political points.

During the summer of 2008, as the U.S. presidential nomination conventions approached, Hamsher continued her opposition to Senator Joe Lieberman's political aspirations in both Firedoglake and other venues, culminating in her The Huffington Post entry emphatically stating her fear that he might be chosen by the Republican presidential candidate John McCain for his vice presidential running mate: "Obviously, I have an elaborate nightmare where Joe Lieberman gets the VP nod, McCain wins, then dies -- and we're looking at a President Lieberman. At which point I and a host of others bloggers who supported Ned Lamont wind up in Guantanamo Bay." After Barack Obama became President Elect on November 4, 2008, Hamsher unsuccessfully opposed Lieberman's staying in the Democratic Caucus of the United States Senate and retaining his chairmanship of his United States Senate Committee on Homeland Security and Governmental Affairs (both of which Obama ultimately supported), as a consequence not only of Senator Lieberman's prior disengagement from the Democratic Party, his support of the Republican presidential candidate McCain, and his failure to adhere to promises not to attack Obama during the campaign, but, also, more importantly from her perspective, of what she alleges to be Lieberman's "prevent[ing] Senatorial investigation into no-bid contracts and contractor abuse within the Department of Homeland Security", urging her readers to sign the "Just Say No to Joe" petition that she posted on Firedoglake.

=== Time magazine, November 21, 2007 ===
In Firedoglake on November 27, 2007, Hamsher posted that she had determined that Priscilla Painton, then Deputy Managing Editor of Time, had edited a controversial column by Joe Klein, published on November 21, 2007. According to Hamsher and several articles by Glenn Greenwald posted online at Salon, as well as articles in The Chicago Tribune and National Review, Klein allegedly published false information regarding legislation that amends the Foreign Intelligence Surveillance Act (FISA): Protect America Act of 2007, based mainly upon claims by Peter Hoekstra, a Republican congressman who opposed that bill. After Klein had qualified central statements in his article, commenting "I may have made a mistake in my column this week about the FISA legislation passed by the House", Hamsher telephoned Painton and asked her "what the editing process was, and how a piece with so many errors made it into print", to which Painton reportedly replied: "That assumes there are any errors", ending the phone call. In response to Hamsher's account of her telephone conversation with Painton, Greenwald questioned the integrity of Time and its editor Painton.

=== Health care reform debate ===
Hamsher is known as a strong advocate for a public health insurance option. In June 2009, she challenged the Congressional Progressive Caucus (CPC) to pledge to vote against any health care reform bill that lacked a public option. Some of these pledges were videotaped. The CPC released their own letter shortly thereafter signed by 60 members, although the letter was vague as to whether it applied to the conference report. Ultimately none of the CPC members honored their pledge. Hamsher was one of the few liberals who opposed the bill until the end. She co-founded a non-profit organization, Public Option Please, to continue the fight for a public option and more generally for universal health care.

Hamsher and Rep. Anna Eshoo had an online debate in which Hamsher argued that proposed protections for so-called biologic drugs were too generous to patent-holders to the detriment of patients. Hamsher also wrote an open letter demanding that Hadassah Lieberman step down as a paid "Global Ambassador" for Susan G. Komen for the Cure due to her husband Sen. Joe Lieberman's threats to filibuster health care reform. Hamsher was criticized for appearing on Fox & Friends and asking viewers to sign her petition to "kill the Senate bill". Hamsher responded, "It scares the bejesus out of the D.C. establishment of both parties to think that the left and right might align against the corporate interests."

Hamsher was frustrated that liberal concerns were not taken more seriously by the Obama administration. According to her, the administration has corralled left-leaning interest groups in a virtual "veal pen". Loyalty is rewarded with access and sinecures. Groups which stray from the administration's message face adverse action on their other priorities and even loss of funding. Within the veal pen there are what she calls "issue validators" such as Planned Parenthood and NARAL Pro-Choice America whose silence allowed the anti-abortion Stupak-Pitts Amendment to pass with little public outcry. Hamsher launched the "One Voice For Choice" phone-banking campaign to call voters in districts of House members who voted for the Stupak Amendment.

=== Financial regulatory reform debate ===
In December 2009 Hamsher teamed up with Grover Norquist to call for the resignation of Rahm Emanuel for an alleged role in the collapse of Fannie Mae and Freddie Mac.

== Community ==
Firedoglake, whose administrators often refer to their most frequent commentators as Firepups, has run into controversy within pro-Democratic Party circles, particularly in its criticism of President Obama's administrative shortcomings on progressive campaign promises. As a result, the derogatory term Firebaggers (a portmanteau of Firepups and Teabaggers, the latter of which is a derogatory term used by critics of the Tea Party movement) has been applied to members of FDL to accompany allegations of seeking ideological purity within the Democratic Party. Firedoglake posters were explicitly happy when U.S. Senator Evan Bayh announced he was not running for re-election in 2010, referring to him as a "Democrat in Name Only" and stating it would be preferable to have a Republican taking his seat than a moderate Democrat, an outcome that did come to pass when Indiana elected GOP veteran Dan Coats in the midterm Indiana Senate race.
