= Missouri Plan =

American state court judges merit selection method

The Missouri Plan (originally the Missouri Nonpartisan Court Plan, also known as the merit plan, or some variation) is a method for the selection of judges. It originated in Missouri in 1940 and has been adopted by many states of the United States. Similar methods are used in some other countries.

Under the plan, a non-partisan commission reviews candidates for a judicial vacancy. The commission then sends to the governor a list of candidates considered best qualified. The governor then has sixty days to select a candidate from the list. If the governor does not make a selection within sixty days, the commission makes the selection.

At the next general election after the completion of one year's service, the judge must stand in a retention election. If a majority votes against retention, the judge is removed from office, and the process starts anew. Otherwise, the judge serves out a full term.

As of 2016, 38 states have a form of merit-based selection and retention method for some or all judges. As of 2024, fourteen states use the Missouri/Merit selection method to screen and appoint all candidates for the state courts of last resort. Eight states have commissions which fill interim vacancies on the highest courts. Twenty states utilize retention elections for judges who wish to serve on highest state courts beyond their initial term.

== Nonpartisan judicial commissions under the plan ==
Under the Missouri Nonpartisan Court Plan, a nonpartisan judicial commission reviews applications, interviews candidates and selects a judicial panel. For the Supreme Court and Court of Appeals, the Appellate Judicial Commission makes the selection. It is composed of three lawyers elected by members of the Missouri Bar (the organization of all lawyers licensed in this state), three citizens selected by the governor, and the chief justice, who serves as chair. Each of the three geographic districts of the Court of Appeals must be represented by one lawyer and one citizen member on the Appellate Judicial Commission.

Each of the circuit courts in Clay, Greene, Jackson, Platte, and St. Louis Counties, and the city of St. Louis has its own circuit judicial commission. These commissions are composed of the chief judge of the court of appeals district in which the circuit is located, plus two lawyers elected by the bar and two citizens selected by the governor. All of the lawyers and citizens must live within the circuit for which they serve the judicial commission.

== History and spread of the plan ==
In line with other reforms urged during the Progressive Era, legal scholars put forth ideas in the first decades of the 1900s to reduce or remove the role of politics in the selection of judges, particularly circuit judges with responsibilities over the day-to-day work of the courts. An example of this advocacy is the merit selection program urged by Albert M. Kales in his work Unpopular Government in the United States (1914).

Support for merit selection increased due to the perceived corruption of urban political bosses. Missouri voters adopted the system by initiative petition in November 1940 after several very contentious judicial elections, which were heavily influenced by the political machine of Tom Pendergast. Most associate and circuit judges are elected. However, the state constitution requires such judges in Jackson County (which includes most of Kansas City) and the city of St. Louis to be selected under the nonpartisan system. Similarly, the voters in Clay and Platte counties (metropolitan Kansas City), St. Louis County, and Greene County (which includes Springfield) have elected to appoint such judges under the nonpartisan system. After Missouri adopted this method for selecting judges, several other states adopted it, either in full or in part. The plan was put forth by a committee chaired by Luther Ely Smith, "founder" of the Gateway Arch National Park.

The Missouri Non-Partisan Court Plan has served as a model for thirty-four other states that use merit selection to fill some or all judicial vacancies. 23 states use the method or a variant for the state supreme court.

A research on the spread of the Missouri plan, using statistical analysis, has found that the most reform-prone states were those that faced a growing urban and industrial population. The authors present that these states were not the most reform-oriented at the time by presenting the simple fact that, although the plan originated in Missouri in 1940, no other state adopted it until 1958. According to their analysis, this wave of adoption coincided closely with the period leading up to and following legislative reapportionment in the 1960s and early 1970s, prompted in part by the Supreme Court’s decision in Baker v. Carr (1962). In this case, the Supreme Court, in a 6-2 decision, decided that state legislative reapportionment questions were justiciable, and the Courts can intervene if appropriate legal reapportionment measures have not been taken. During this period, rural legislators in states with rapidly growing urban populations faced the prospect of losing long-standing overrepresentation in state legislatures. The adoption of the Missouri Plan served as a strategic response to these anticipated power shifts, allowing rural interests to limit the influence of urban areas in the selection of judges who would later oversee reapportionment disputes. This incentive experienced a decline once the reapportionment was complete.

== Advantages of the Missouri plan ==
=== Emphasis on judicial qualifications ===
When it comes to advantages, the pre-appointment screening process, conducted by judicial nominating commissions, emphasizes competence and professional reputation before political affiliations. For the supporters, this allows the governor of the state not to receive a politically charged individual, and it increases the likelihood that judges are selected based on merit and fitness for office, rather than name recognition or political affiliation.

The Missouri Plan allows those individuals who were unlikely to be selected to a judgeship to have an opportunity to be selected as one. Examples include the City of Saint Louis, where Republican candidates have faced electoral disadvantages; however, through the nonpartisan plan, the judgeships have been given to independents and republicans alike who passed through the vetting process.

=== Rankings and legal quality ===
Scholars have conducted thorough empirical research on various judicial selection methods. A 2008 comparative study by the Show-Me Institute found that states using Missouri-style merit selection ranked higher, on average, on measures of “Average State Legal System Quality Score” than other judicial selection methods. The highest recorded score in the article for this judicial method of selection was in 2007, with 64.4, compared to other selection methods.

== Criticism ==
The Missouri Plan is not without critics. There are several alternative ways of filling judicial posts that are used in other states. These include direct elections (either partisan or non-partisan), election by the state legislature, or appointment by the governor with advice and consent of the state senate. Missouri had previously used all of these methods before adopting the Nonpartisan Court Plan in 1940.

=== Excessive influence of attorneys ===
Better Courts for Missouri has argued that flaws in the current plan give elite trial lawyers too much control over judicial selection. According to the organization's executive director, "they are a small, insular group who have their interests. They have a lot to add to the process, but we don't think they should dominate the process - (and they) are in no way accountable to Missourians."

Professor Stephen Ware of the University of Kansas wrote about the Missouri Plan, "As the bar is an elite segment of society, states that give lawyers more power than their fellow citizens are rightly described as elitist." Ware continued:

...even commission systems have democratic legitimacy insofar as members of the nominating commission are appointed by popularly elected officials. Democratic principles are violated, however, when members of the commission are selected by 'a minority of the persons, i.e. lawyers in their area'. This, of course, is the core of the Missouri Plan – allowing the bar to select some of the commission and then declining to offset that bar power with confirmation by the senate or other popularly elected body. And it is this core that deprives the Missouri Plan of democratic legitimacy.

=== Low diversity of the commission ===
Elbert Walton, a disbarred lawyer and former Missouri State legislator, believed that the plan had a negative effect on African Americans. "It is unfair that lawyers elect judges ... It disenfranchises people and it especially disenfranchises black people." At a press conference in February, 2008, Walton accused Missouri Bar President Charlie Harris, an African-American, of ignoring the Missouri Plan's effect on black people. Walton noted that no African American had ever been elected to one of the Missouri Bar's three slots on the Appellate Judicial Commission, though many have been appointed judges, and suggested that Mr. Harris "ought to be ashamed of himself" for supporting such a plan.

Governor Phil Bredesen of Tennessee has criticized that state's version of the Missouri Plan for similar reasons. Despite criticisms from elected politicians such as Walton and Bredesen, no published research or data suggests that Missouri Plan states have less judicial diversity compared to non-Missouri Plan states.

=== Political interference ===
The Wall Street Journal wrote "If the recent slugfests have proven anything, it's that Missouri's courts are every bit as hung up in politics as they are in other states. The difference is that in Missouri the process happens behind closed doors."

Similarly, Professor Brian T. Fitzpatrick of Vanderbilt University has argued that politics are undoubtedly a part of judicial selection in Missouri Plan states, writing, "In short, I am skeptical that merit selection removes politics from judicial selection. Rather, merit selection may simply move the politics of judicial selection into closer alignment with the ideological preferences of the bar." Fitzpatrick notes that "…if we are willing to accept the notions that lawyers care about the outcomes of judicial decisions and that these outcomes are correlated with judges' ideological preferences, then we might expect merit commissions to select judges who share the ideological preferences of the bar rather than those of the public."

Tennessee governor Phil Bredesen has made similar complaints. He remarked, "I think [the nominating commissioners] have been vastly too political in their selection process. And what they are supposed to do is give you the best candidates in the ideal world."

Researchers have also noted the overpoliticization of the nominating committee. A research that measured the performance of the Missouri Plan mentions that, “In Florida, for example, of the sixty-eight commissioners returning questionnaires, sixty-two were democrats, indicating heavy democratic dominance in state judicial selection, despite a growing republican party in the state. Many commissioners also reported that their meetings were informal and nondirected, permitting the officially taboo subject.”

=== Uninformed selection by the committee ===
Political Scientists have extensively researched the Missouri Court Plan. In their work, there have been complaints that the current unstructured selection method hinders the ability of those in the selection committee and the governor to have adequate information about the nominees. Scholars mention that both the Missouri Senate’s Interim Committee and the Missouri Bar Association agree that the system needs to be reformed and made more systematic and open.

== See also ==
- Judicial nominating commission
- Tennessee Plan
