= Colorado water courts =

Specialized state courts of Colorado, U.S.

The Colorado water courts are specialized state courts of the U.S. state of Colorado. There are seven water courts, one in each of Colorado's seven major river basins: South Platte, Arkansas, Rio Grande, Gunnison, Colorado, White, and San Juan. The water courts are divisions of the district courts in that basin.

Water judges are district court judges appointed by the Colorado Supreme Court. The water courts have exclusive subject-matter jurisdiction in the determination of water rights, the use and administration of water, and all other water matters within the jurisdiction of the water divisions.

The water courts were established by the Water Right Determination and Administration Act of 1969, a state law which created seven water divisions based upon the drainage patterns of Colorado's rivers. Each water division is staffed with a division engineer, appointed by the state engineer; a water judge, appointed by the Supreme Court; a water referee, appointed by the water judge; and a water clerk, assigned by the district court.

The seven water courts are:

- Water Division One - South Platte River Basin (based at the Weld County Courthouse in Greeley)
- Water Division Two - Arkansas River Basin (based at the Pueblo County Judicial Building in Pueblo)
- Water Division Three - Rio Grande River Basin (based at the Alamosa County Courthouse in Alamosa)
- Water Division Four - Gunnison River Basin (based at the Montrose County Courthouse in Montrose)
- Water Division Five - Colorado River Basin (based at the Garfield County Courthouse in Glenwood Springs)
- Water Division Six - White River Basin (based at the Routt County Justice Center in Steamboat Springs)
- Water Division Seven - San Juan River Basin (based at La Plata Combined Courts in Durango)

== See also ==
- Colorado Division of Water Resources
- Judiciary of Colorado
- Government of Colorado
- Law of Colorado
