= Colorado State Public Defender =

American public office

- The Great Seal of the State of Colorado

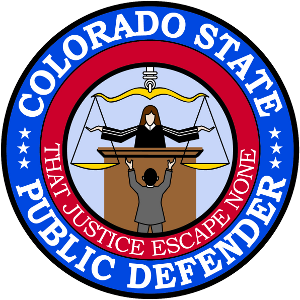
- Seal of the Office of the Colorado State Public Defender

Agency overview
- Formed: 1970
- Headquarters: Denver, Colorado
- Employees: 1,097
- Annual budget: $155 m USD (2023-2024)
- Agency executives: Megan Ring, Colorado State Public Defender; Karen Taylor, First Assistant Public Defender; Lucienne Ohanian, Chief Deputy; Joyce Akhahenda, Chief Deputy; Zak Brown, Chief Deputy; Stephen Ettinger, Chief Financial Officer; Kyle Hughes, Chief Information Officer; Veronica Graves, Chief Human Resources Officer
- Parent Agency: Colorado Judicial Branch
- Website: Office of the Colorado State Public Defender

The Office of the Colorado State Public Defender provides legal assistance to individuals charged with a crime in Colorado state court who are financially unable to retain private counsel. The office consists of 21 regional trial offices, a centralized appellate office that handles appeals from every jurisdiction, and a centralized state administrative office.

== History ==
In 1963, after Gideon v. Wainwright, the Colorado General Assembly passed the Colorado Defender Act. This Act authorized Colorado counties to either establish a public defender's office or remain under the previous ad hoc system of appointing counsel for indigent citizens accused of criminal offenses. Four county public defender offices were established under the Act: Denver, Brighton, Pueblo and Durango. In 1970, the State Legislature passed Senate Bill 126, which created the Office of the State Public Defender as an independent state agency.

Initially, the Colorado Supreme Court appointed the Colorado State Public Defender. Rollie R. Rogers was the first State Public Defender. He served from October 1969 through February 1978. On August 1, 1982, David F. Vela was appointed State Public Defender. He fulfilled the responsibilities of the office for more than 17 years, until his retirement on December 31, 1999. David S. Kaplan became the State Public Defender and served from January 1, 2000 until October 31, 2006. Upon his resignation, Douglas K. Wilson was appointed the 6th State Public Defender, effective November 1, 2006. After Douglas Wilson's retirement in July 2018, Megan A. Ring was appointed the 7th State Public Defender, and currently heads the organization. Ms. Ring is the first female appointed to the position.

=== 2024 Malware Event ===
In February, 2024, the Colorado State Public Defender's computer network was temporarily shut down following a malware event. The attack shut down the network for a period of time as well as copied over files of an "untold" amount of clients, which may have included a client or potential client's name, social security number, driver's license or identification card number, other government identification numbers, medical information, and/or health insurance identification number. OSPD, The Governor's Office of Information Technology, and Colorado law enforcement are actively investigating how the malware incident was caused.

== Offices ==
The Colorado State Public Defender has twenty-one trial offices throughout Colorado: Alamosa, Arapahoe, Boulder, Brighton, Colorado Springs, Denver, Dillon, Douglas, Durango, Fort Collins, Glenwood Springs, Golden, Grand Junction, Greeley, La Junta, Montrose, Pueblo, Salida, Steamboat Springs, Sterling, and Trinidad. Appeals statewide are handled from an appellate office in Denver. The Colorado State Public Defender also maintains a central administrative office in Denver.

== Notable defenders and alumni ==
- Robert E. Allen
- Michael L. Bender
- John L. Kane Jr.
- Claire Levy
- Larry Pozner
- Nancy E. Rice
- Nicholas Sarwark
