= Better Courts for Missouri =

American civic activist organization

Better Courts for Missouri was an American 501(c)(4) organization that proposed changes be made to the Missouri Plan for selecting judges. The St. Louis Post Dispatch described it as an opponent of the Missouri Plan.

Better Courts for Missouri proposed enacting several changes to the judicial selection process, including increasing the nominees submitted to the governor from three to five, allowing the governor to veto the panel of judicial nominees submitted to him, and Senate confirmation of members of the Appellate Judicial Commission. In 2008, the group circulated an initiative petition for a ballot measure to enact these changes, but failed to submit signatures to the Secretary of State. In 2009, the group supported two legislative efforts, House Joint Resolution 10 and Senate Joint Resolution 9. Both failed to pass, though House Joint Resolution 10 did succeed in passing through the House. In 2012, the group supported one bill, Senate Joint Resolution 51, which passed through both houses of the legislature and appeared on the November 2012 ballot as Amendment 3.

In 2009, the group announced their sponsorship of an initiative petition to replace the Missouri Plan with a judicial nomination system based on the federal model. The selection model proposed by the initiative would allow the governor to nominate a judge to the bench and require Senate approval of the nominee, as in the federal system, but would maintain the retention elections that take place under the current judicial selection system.
