= Jeralyn Merritt =

American lawyer (born 1949)

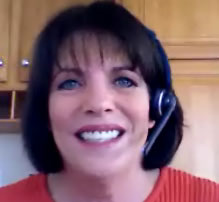
- An undated photo of Merritt during an online video chat
- Born: September 28, 1949 (age 76); New York City, U.S.
- Education: University of Michigan (BA); University of Denver (JD)
- Occupations: Criminal defense attorney, author, commentator
- Awards: Marshall Stern Legislative Achievement Award, Al Horn Award
- Website: www.jmerrittlawoffice.com

Jeralyn Elise Merritt (born September 28, 1949) is an American criminal defense attorney in private practice in Denver, Colorado, since 1974. She served as one of the trial lawyers for Timothy McVeigh in the Oklahoma City bombing case in 1996 and 1997. In 2002 Merritt founded and is the principal author of the blog TalkLeft: The Politics of Crime. She also serves as a legal commentator for news media programs and as an internet journalist.

== Education ==
A 1967 graduate of New Rochelle High School, in New Rochelle, New York, Merritt attended Case Western Reserve University before transferring to the University of Michigan, Ann Arbor, where she majored in political science and earned a B.A. in 1971. In 1973 she earned a J.D. degree from the University of Denver Law School, returning there to teach "Wrongful Convictions" and "Criminal Defense" as Lecturer in Law from 2000 to 2003.

== Legal career ==
In 1974 Merritt was admitted to the Bar in Colorado, established her own law firm, and in 1981 she was admitted to practice before the U.S. Supreme Court. She is also a member of the Colorado Criminal Defense Bar. From 1996 to 2007, she served as a member of the LexisNexis Martindale-Hubbell Legal Advisory Board.

In 1996 and 1997 she served as one of the trial lawyers for Timothy McVeigh in the Oklahoma City bombing case, after the court venue moved to Denver. In 1995 she received the first annual Marshall Stern Legislative Achievement Award, from the National Association of Criminal Defense Lawyers (NACDL), for which she has served as a member of the Board of Directors (1995–2001), secretary (2002–2003) and treasurer (2003–2004), as the vice-chair of NACDL's Innocence Project from 1998 to 2002 and on other committees. In 2008 she received the Al Horn Award from the National Organization for the Reform of Marijuana Laws (NORML), "a Lifetime achievement award for advancing the cause of justice and extraordinary support of NORML."

After giving up her practice for a year and a half in order to work on the McVeigh defense team, since 1997, Merritt has continued her own criminal defense practice emphasizing federal drug and white collar crimes and has served as a legal analyst for and commentator on television news programs. From 1997 to 1999, she served as a television legal analyst for MSNBC, and, from 1996 to 2008, as a guest legal commentator on television for NBC, MSNBC, CNBC, CNN, Court TV and Fox News, presenting her perspective as a criminal defense attorney on contemporary legal cases being covered on national media news programs. Merritt is also a specialist in the use of the internet as a legal research resource and presents seminars and speeches on its use in investigation, on handwriting analysis, and on other matters pertaining to her legal specialties.

== Areas of practice ==
- Federal and State Drug Offenses
- Complex Federal Criminal Cases (including multi-defendant drug and fraud conspiracies)
- Criminal and Civil Forfeitures
- Pre-Indictment and Grand Jury Representation
- White Collar Defense (financial crimes, including fraud, money laundering, criminal forfeitures)
- Electronic Surveillance (cases involving the use of electronic surveillance, including wiretaps)

== Bar admissions ==
- Colorado Bar Association (CBA or cobar) (1974)
- Colorado Criminal Defense Bar (1974)
- Supreme Court of Colorado (1974)
- U.S. District Court, District of Colorado (1974)
- U.S. Court of Appeals, Tenth Circuit (1974)
- U.S. Supreme Court (1981)
- New York Supreme Court (1990)
- U.S. Court of Appeals, Fifth Circuit (1990)
- U.S. District Court, District of Arizona (1991)
- U.S. Court of Appeals, Ninth Circuit (1999)

== Internet journalism ==
Merritt is the creator of CrimeLynx, an online legal resource for legal professionals and the general public, and a blog called TalkLeft: The Politics of Crime, which is a three-time winner of a Koufax Award for best single-issue blog in 2002, 2003 and 2004 (in 2004 TalkLeft shared the award with Grits for Breakfast), and a 2006 winner of the Weblog Awards for "The Best of the Top 250 Blogs". TalkLeft became one of the blogs featured in "The Ruckus" section at Newsweek Online in 2007.

Merritt covered the United States v. Libby trial on TalkLeft, and with Jane Hamsher and Marcy Wheeler, was among the first bloggers to receive fully accredited media passes to a U.S. federal trial and during which they also appeared on PoliticsTV.com for a round up summarizing each day's trial events. Her blog posts on the Lewis "Scooter" Libby trial appeared in FireDogLake and The Huffington Post. On August 2, 2007, Merritt moderated a panel discussion at the 2007 YearlyKos Convention, featuring Christy Hardin Smith of Jane Hamsher's Firedoglake and Marcy Wheeler of The Next Hurrah, relating their experiences "liveblogging" the Libby trial. The panel also included Sheldon L. Snook, Chief of Staff to the Chief Judge of the United States District Court for the District of Columbia, who was "the court official in charge of news media at the Libby trial."

TalkLeft was accredited as a national blog at the 2008 Democratic National Convention, held in Denver, Colorado, from August 25 through 28, 2008, posting photographs of celebrities from both the Pepsi Center and various other convention venues in Denver and cross-links to other bloggers' reports and photographs. Recently, she has consolidated spaces on TalkLeft for archived and ongoing discussion board topics such as the Duke Lacrosse Rape Case and the killing of Trayvon Martin.

In addition to blogging at The Huffington Post and for Elevated Voices, published in 5280: Denver's Mile High Magazine, Merritt has guest blogged for Eric Alterman's Altercation. She has also occasionally served as a guest columnist for newspapers such as the Rocky Mountain News, and as a guest moderator for online discussions on legal issues for The Washington Post. Merritt has also been featured in a number of online videos and podcasts in which she discusses legal and political issues, such as the Libby trial, the Dismissal of U.S. attorneys controversy, and Hillary Clinton.

== Publications and filmography ==
- Merritt, Jeralyn E. (co-author) USA Patriot Act of 2001: An Analysis (2002).
- Was Justice Denied? Merritt appeared as a member of the legal team in a feature-length documentary film re-examining two murder cases which the defendants claim resulted in wrongful convictions.

== Videos and webcasts ==
- "Götterdemocraterung" with Jeralyn Merritt and Mark Kleiman. Webcast recorded April 22, 2008. Posted on Bloggingheads.tv, April 24, 2008. Accessed May 22, 2008.
- The Libby Trial V-Log with Jeralyn Merritt, Jane Hamsher, and Marcy Wheeler. YouTube clips recorded from January 29 to January 31, 2007. Archived on Google Videos. Accessed May 22, 2008.
- "The Loneliness of the Pro-Hillary Blogger" with Jeralyn Merritt and Ann Althouse. Webcast recorded April 8, 2008. Posted on Bloggingheads.tv, April 9, 2008. Accessed May 22, 2008.
- "Purging Prosecutors: Was TV News Clueless?". Interview of Jeralyn Merritt (guest) by Howard Kurtz. Reliable Sources, CNN, broadcast on March 18, 2007. YouTube clip [was] archived on Google Videos. Accessed May 23, 2008. (No longer accessible online; see transcript for program segment "U.S. Attorney Firings Scandal". Accessed September 29, 2012.)
- "Why Won't Hillary Quit?" with Jeralyn Merritt and Ann Althouse. Webcast recorded May 7, 2008. Posted on Bloggingheads.tv, May 7, 2008. Accessed May 22, 2008.
