= 5280 =

American monthly magazine

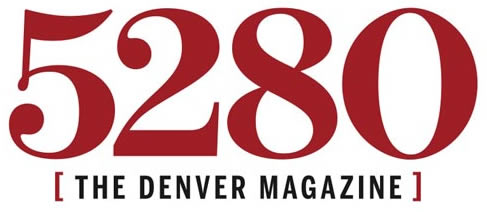

- Cover of 5280's December 2012 issue
- Editor-In-Chief: Jessica LaRusso
- Frequency: Monthly
- Circulation: 335,500
- Founder: Daniel Brogan
- Founded: 1993
- Company: 5280 Publishing, Inc.
- Country: United States
- Based in: Denver, Colorado
- Language: English
- Website: www.5280.com

5280 is an American monthly magazine focused on Denver, Colorado and published by 5280 Publishing, Inc. Its name derives from Denver's elevation of 5,280 feet (1609 m / 1 mile) above sea level. The monthly publication has an audited circulation of 77,027 as of 2011. It is a member of the City and Regional Magazine Association (CRMA).

== History and profile ==
The magazine was founded in 1993 by Daniel Brogan, a former reporter and columnist for the Chicago Tribune.

Like other city and regional magazines, 5280 covers dining, entertainment, and special events, as well as local and regional politics. Its "daily blog of the latest news, gossip, and commentary from the Mile-High City" is called Elevated Voices (official website).

Annual cover stories include the "Top of the Town" awards, with top ratings in a wide range of products, services, stores, shops and community features; "Top Doctors", listing top-rated physicians by specialty; and "Top Restaurants" (official website).

Since 2005, 5280 has been a finalist for six National Magazine Awards (known as "Ellies"), "the magazine industry's highest honor." In 2005, 5280 was a finalist for both "Conduct Unbecoming" and "Private Stites Should Have Been Saved", by its Executive Editor Maximillian Potter. "Out in the Cold", an article by Mike Kessler on the plight of workers at the Rocky Flats nuclear weapons plant, was a National Magazine Award finalist in 2008. "Low on O2", a package by Lindsey B. Koehler and Natasha Gardner exploring the effects of living at higher altitudes, was a finalist in 2010.

In 2016, 5280 acquired Colorado Parent.

In 2024, the magazine was sold to Charity Huff who is also the CEO and Publisher. The current Editor-in-Chief is Jessica LaRusso.

== Notable staff and contributors ==
Notable 5280 staff and contributors, past and present:

- Gary Hart
- Kent Haruf
- Jeralyn Merritt (contributor to Elevated Voices)
- J. R. Moehringer
- Hampton Sides
