= Michigan Liberal =

Michigan Liberal (MichiganLiberal.com) is a defunct American political blog, that published news and opinions from a liberal or progressive point of view. It functioned as a discussion forum and group blog for a variety of Michigan netroots activists, whose efforts were primarily directed toward influencing and strengthening the Democratic Party.

Michigan Liberal was founded in 2005 by Matt Ferguson, and modeled after the national site Daily Kos. Originally co-owned and run by Laura Packard and Jon Koller, and from 2007 until 2017 the owner and editor was Eric Baerren. Former contributors include Marcy Wheeler, Larry Kestenbaum, and Mark Grebner. In 2017, the Michigan Liberal brand was transferred to convicted felon Will Westerfield (aka: Charles William Westerfield), who was then promptly arrested in May 2017 for check fraud.

The site was recommended and praised by former Michigan Governor Jennifer Granholm, in her speech to the 2006 Democratic state convention, in media interviews, and on her campaign web site.
