= Albert M. Kales =

American lawyer

Albert Martin Kales (March 11, 1875 – July 26, 1922) was an American lawyer and legal scholar.

With the exception of one year as a visiting instructor at Harvard Law School, he performed most of his scholarly work at Northwestern University School of Law, at which he taught in 1902–1916 and 1917–1922. He is best known for his 1914 work Unpopular Government in the United States, a work that helped pioneer the concept of appointing U.S. judges rather than electing them in a partisan political process. This concept spread in many states and is now commonly called the Missouri Plan, after the name of one of the first states to adopt it.

== Biography ==
Kales was born in 1875 in Chicago. He graduated from Harvard Law in 1899 and was immediately licensed to practice in Illinois. He began teaching property law at Northwestern Law in 1902, and was named a professor in 1910. He continued to practice law privately after achieving this rank, asserting that his personal case load of 6 cases per year did not create a conflict of interest between his teaching load and his private practice, and further asserting that the active practice of law was a necessary element in the ability of a legal scholar to remain relevant. Offered a faculty position at Harvard Law in 1917, he turned down the honor because the school would have required him to lay down his practice. Kales' works related to property law included Estates and Future Interests, published in 1920.

Kales published Unpopular Government in the United States in 1914 in opposition to a new class of political operatives whom Kales labeled "politocrats." Political party bosses in his native Cook County, Illinois had devised a reliable way to control the elections of candidates to office, including judges, through the invention of so-called 'bedsheet ballots.' A 'bedsheet ballot' was a lengthy election paper with long lists of candidates for a wide variety of offices to govern a heavily populated area, such as Chicago. Utilizing a combination of game theory and thought experiments, Kales asserted that ordinary voters could not be expected to cast a thoughtful ballot for or against each of the members of a long list of candidates. Kales demanded that his readers face the fact that in any purely "elective" system for the popular selection of judges, the judges would in fact be nominated by political bosses; and that a system of merit selection could actually improve the ties of responsibility between the judiciary and the voters. He set forth several elements necessary for the success of a merit-selection system, of which the principal one is that the person publicly responsible for the appointment should be a single high-profile individual directly elected by popular vote. Examples given were the offices of governor and chief justice. Kales further urged that the ultimate appointer be advised by a professional panel, selected by other judges or by the bar association of the state where the appointment is made.

Kales died of typhoid fever in 1922 and did not live to see any state adopt a merit selection program for appointment of U.S. judges. As of 2015, however, twenty-seven states and the District of Columbia had enacted statutory or constitutional laws to provide for some form of merit selection. Ironically, Kales' native state of Illinois was not one of them.
