= State supreme courts in the United States =

Highest court in the state judiciary of a U.S. state

In the United States, a state supreme court (known by other names in some states) is the highest court in the state judiciary of a U.S. state. On matters of state law, the judgment of a state supreme court is considered final and binding in both state and federal courts.

Generally, a state supreme court, like most appellate tribunals, is exclusively for hearing appeals of legal issues. Each state supreme court consists of a panel of judges selected by methods outlined in the state constitution. Among the most common methods for selection are gubernatorial appointment, non-partisan election, and partisan election, but the different states follow a variety of procedures.

Typically, a state supreme court is the highest court that cases within a state's judicial system can be appealed to and is always the final authority on the interpretation of state laws and state constitutions. State and federal courts operate as separate judicial systems, and state court rulings cannot be appealed to federal district courts, federal courts of appeals or the United States Supreme Court.

== Role and powers ==
Under the system of federalism established by the United States Constitution, federal courts have limited jurisdiction, and state courts handle many more cases than federal courts. Each of the fifty states has at least one supreme court that serves as the highest court in the state; two states, Texas and Oklahoma, have separate supreme courts for civil and criminal matters. The five permanently inhabited U.S. territories, as well Washington, D.C., each have comparable supreme courts. On matters of state law, the judgment of a state supreme court is considered final and binding in both state and federal courts. State supreme courts are completely distinct from any United States federal courts located within the geographical boundaries of a state's territory, or the federal-level Supreme Court.

The exact duties and powers of the state supreme courts are established by state constitutions and state law. Generally, state supreme courts, like most appellate tribunals, are exclusively for hearing appeals on decisions issued by lower courts, and do not make any finding of facts or hold trials. They can, however, overrule the decisions of lower courts, remand cases to lower courts for further proceedings, and establish binding precedent for future cases. Some state supreme courts do have original jurisdiction over specific issues; for example, the Supreme Court of Virginia has original jurisdiction over cases of habeas corpus, mandamus, prohibition, and writs of actual innocence based on DNA or other biological evidence.

=== Jurisdiction and appellate procedure ===
As the highest court in the state, a state supreme court has appellate jurisdiction over all matters of state law. Many states have two or more levels of courts below the state supreme court; for example, in Pennsylvania, a case might first be heard in one of the Pennsylvania courts of common pleas, be appealed to the Superior Court of Pennsylvania, and then finally be appealed to the Supreme Court of Pennsylvania. In other states, including Delaware, the state supreme court is the only appellate court in the state and thus has direct appellate jurisdiction over all lower courts.

Like the U.S. Supreme Court, most state supreme courts have implemented "discretionary review." Under such a system, intermediate appellate courts are entrusted with deciding the vast majority of appeals. Intermediate appellate courts generally focus on the mundane task of what appellate specialists call "error correction," which means their primary task is to decide whether the record reflects that the trial court correctly applied existing law. In a few states without intermediate appellate courts, the state supreme court may operate under "mandatory review", in which it must hear all appeals from the trial courts. This was the case, for example, in Nevada prior to 2014. For certain categories of cases, many state supreme courts that otherwise have discretionary review operate under mandatory review, usually with regard to cases involving the interpretation of the state constitution or capital punishment.

One of the informal traditions of the American legal system is that all litigants are entitled to at least one appeal after a final judgment on the merits. However, appeal is merely a privilege provided by statute, court rules, or custom; the U.S. Supreme Court has repeatedly ruled that there is no federal constitutional right to an appeal.

=== States with unique appellate procedures ===
Iowa, Nevada, and Oklahoma have a unique procedure for appeals. In those states, all appeals are filed with the appropriate Supreme Court (Iowa and Nevada each have a single Supreme Court, while Oklahoma has separate civil and criminal Supreme Courts) which then keeps all cases of first impression for itself to decide. It forwards the remaining cases – which deal with points of law it has already addressed – to the intermediate Court of Appeals. Under this so-called "push-down" or "deflection" model of appellate procedure, the state supreme court can immediately establish final statewide precedents on important issues of first impression as soon as they arise, rather than waiting several months or years for the intermediate appellate court to make a first attempt at resolving the issue (and leaving the law uncertain in the interim).

Notably, the Supreme Court of Virginia has always operated under discretionary review for nearly all cases, but from its creation in 1985, the intermediate Court of Appeals of Virginia heard appeals as a matter of right only in family and administrative cases. After two other states adopted appeals of right in the late 2000s, this left Virginia as the only state in the Union with no first appeal of right for the vast majority of civil and criminal cases. Appellants were still free to petition for review, but such petitions were subject to severe length constraints (6,125 words or 35 pages in Virginia) and necessarily were more narrowly targeted than an opening brief in an appeal of right to an intermediate appellate court (in contrast, an appellant's opening brief to a California intermediate appellate court can run up to 14,000 words). The vast majority of decisions of Virginia circuit courts in civil and criminal cases were thereby insulated from appellate review on the merits. In March 2021, Virginia enacted a comprehensive reform package allowing for appeals of right to the Court of Appeals in civil and criminal cases. The same bill expanded the Court of Appeals from 11 to 17 judges to handle the increased workload.

== Relationship with federal courts and federal law ==
Under American federalism, a state supreme court's ruling on a matter of purely state law is final and binding and must be accepted in both state and federal courts. Although, federal courts are sometimes allowed "collateral review" of some state cases in specific situations, for example regarding individuals on death row, but the case must still not depend entirely on the resolution of a state law or state constitutional issue to warrant such a review.

As the U.S. Supreme Court recognized in Erie Railroad Co. v. Tompkins (1938), no part of the federal Constitution actually grants federal courts or the federal Congress the power to directly dictate the content of state law (as distinguished from creating altogether separate federal law that in a particular situation may override state law). Clause 1 of Section 2 of Article Three of the United States Constitution describes the scope of federal judicial power, but only extended it to "the Laws of the United States" and not the laws of the several or individual states. It is this silence on that latter issue that gave rise to the American distinction between state and federal common law not found in other English-speaking common law federations like Australia and Canada.

The vast majority of the time, the state supreme court is the highest court for appeals for state level lawsuits. In limited circumstances, a state lawsuit may be appealed to the United States Supreme Court, but the plaintiff must choose to frame the question in their lawsuit as also containing a federal question before the Court will even agree to hear it. Because of the aforementioned silence in the US Constitution (as well as Section 25 of the Judiciary Act of 1789 and successor sections), the United States Supreme Court cannot and never reviews decisions of state courts that depend entirely on the resolution of a state law or state constitutional issue. The nationwide significance of a case, or the existence of federal laws or United States Supreme Court precedents addressing similar subjects, does not by itself create a federal question that would make a state lawsuit eligible for review by the United States Supreme Court. State court rulings resting on state laws or state constitutions are generally beyond the U.S. Supreme Court's appellate jurisdiction. Since there really is no federal overlap in the vast majority of state cases, the decision of the state supreme court is effectively final, as any petition for certiorari to the U.S. Supreme Court will be summarily denied without comment.

In theory, state supreme courts are bound by the precedent established by the U.S. Supreme Court as to all issues of federal law, however, a U.S. Supreme Court ruling that a law does not violate the federal Constitution does not necessarily prevent state supreme courts from finding similar laws unconstitutional under their respective state constitutions. State courts may interpret their own constitutions as providing greater protections than the federal Constitution, even when the U.S. Supreme Court has upheld comparable laws against federal constitutional challenges. When the U.S. Supreme Court leaves an issue to the states, state supreme courts generally retain the authority to determine whether state laws addressing that issue comply with their own state constitutions.

Some scholars have argued that state and federal courts should judge according to different judicial theories on topics such as statutory interpretation and stare decisis.

== Selection ==
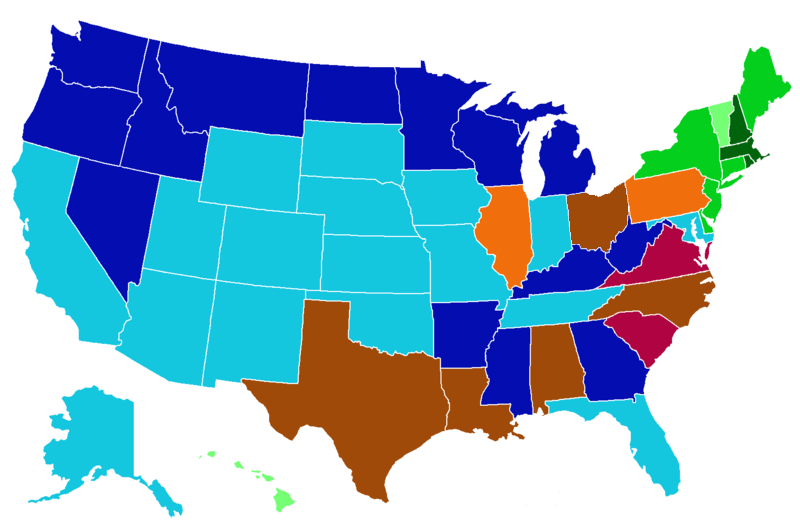
Processes for selecting state supreme court judges: Gubernatorial appointment, judges serve a single term (Note: Massachusetts and New Hampshire have mandatory retirement ages, while Rhode Island has life tenure.) Gubernatorial appointment and re-appointment Gubernatorial appointment, other body re-appoints (Note: In Hawaii, a judicial commission re-appoints judges, while in Vermont, the legislature re-appoints judges.) Gubernatorial appointment, followed by retention election (Note: Many, though not all, of the states in this category use the Missouri Plan. In New Mexico, judges are initially appointed by the governor, then face a partisan election; after that initial partisan election, judges win new terms through retention elections.) Legislative appointment and re-appointment Non-partisan elections (Note: Montana makes use of non-partisan retention elections at the end of a judge's term.) Partisan elections Partisan election, followed by retention election

State supreme court judges are selected in a variety of ways, with the method of selection often depending on the circumstances in which the seat is filled. Under one common method, the Missouri Plan, the governor fills judicial vacancies by choosing from a list compiled by a non-partisan commission. These judges serve an interim term until they stand in a retention election, in which they win a full term if a majority of voters vote for retention. Many other states elect judges through non-partisan elections in which multiple candidates appear on the ballot without their partisan affiliation listed. Most of the remaining states base their judicial selection system on gubernatorial appointments or partisan elections, although several states use a mix of different methods. South Carolina and Virginia use a system of legislative appointment, while in Vermont, the governor makes the initial appointment of judges, but the legislature has the power to re-appoint judges to new terms.

Various other factors can influence the appointment and re-appointment of state supreme court judges. Most judicial selection systems involving gubernatorial appointment make use of a nominating commission to recommend a list of candidates from which the governor must choose, but a minority of states allow the governor to nominate candidates even if they were not recommended by the commission. Many of the states that use gubernatorial appointment require the appointment to be confirmed by the state legislature or some other body, such as the Massachusetts Governor's Council. Although most states limit judicial terms to a set number of years, judges in Massachusetts and New Hampshire serve until they reach a mandatory retirement limit, while in Rhode Island, judges serve lifetime appointments. Most judges represent the entire state, but in Illinois, Kentucky, Louisiana, and Mississippi, judges represent districts of the state. Many states, including some states in which the governor is not otherwise involved in the appointment process, allow the governor to make interim appointments to fill judicial vacancies.

In many states with judicial elections, political contributions from groups such as trade associations and political action committees are allowed.

=== Removal ===
The various states provide different methods for the removal of state supreme court judges during their terms, with many states providing multiple methods. Two common methods of removal are impeachment by the state legislature, and removal by state judicial boards or commissions. Other states provide for the removal of judges through recall elections, court action, gubernatorial action (with legislative consent), or through a resolution passed by a super-majority in both houses of the state legislature.

== Location ==
Traditionally, state supreme courts are headquartered in the capital cities of their respective states, though they may occasionally hold oral arguments elsewhere. The six main exceptions are:

- Alaska, whose supreme court is located in and usually sits in its largest city, Anchorage (monthly), but also sits in Fairbanks and the state capital Juneau (quarterly), and in other Alaskan communities on an as-needed basis.
- California, whose supreme court is headquartered in San Francisco and maintains only branch offices in the state capital Sacramento, and the state's largest city, Los Angeles, and hears argument at all three locations each year.
- Louisiana, whose supreme court is headquartered in New Orleans' French Quarter and not in the capital city Baton Rouge.
- Maine, whose supreme court is headquartered in Portland, the state's largest city, and not the state capital Augusta.
- Pennsylvania, whose supreme court has facilities at three coequal locations: the state capital Harrisburg, the largest city Philadelphia, and the second-largest city Pittsburgh.
- Tennessee, whose state constitution requires its supreme court to sit at three coequal locations of Nashville (capital, Middle Tennessee), Knoxville (East Tennessee), and Jackson (West Tennessee).

As for the court's actual facilities, a state supreme court may be housed in the state capitol, in a nearby state office building shared with other courts or state executive branch agencies, or in a small courthouse reserved for its exclusive use. State supreme courts normally require a courtroom for oral argument, private chambers for all justices, a conference room, offices for law clerks and other support staff, a law library, and a lobby with a filing window where the court clerk can accept filings and release new decisions in the form of "slip opinions" (that is, in looseleaf format held together only by a staple).

== Terminology ==
Because state supreme courts generally hear only appeals, some courts have names which directly indicate their function – in the state of New York and in the District of Columbia, the highest court is called the "Court of Appeals". (Note: This was also formerly the case in Maryland. Maryland's jury trial courts are called "Circuit Courts" (non-jury trials are usually conducted by the "District Courts," whose decisions may be appealed to the Circuit Courts), and its intermediate appellate court was formerly called the "Court of Special Appeals". In the 2022 general election held on November 8, 2022, voters approved a constitutional amendment to change the name of the court to the "Supreme Court of Maryland", and the title of its judges to "Justice." The name of the intermediate appellate court was changed to the Appellate Court of Maryland. It became effective on December 14, 2022.) In New York, the "Supreme Court" is the trial court of general unlimited jurisdiction and the intermediate appellate court is called the "Supreme Court—Appellate Division".

West Virginia mixes the two; its highest court is called the "Supreme Court of Appeals".

Other states' supreme courts have used the term "Appeals": Pennsylvania's court of last resort from 1780-1808; New Jersey's supreme courts under the 1844 constitution; and Delaware's supreme court were all called the "Court of Errors and Appeals". The term "Errors" refers to the now-obsolete writ of error, which was used by state supreme courts to correct certain types of egregious errors committed by lower courts.

Massachusetts and New Hampshire originally named their highest courts the "Superior Court of Judicature." Since 1780, Massachusetts has used the name "Supreme Judicial Court" (to distinguish itself from the state legislature, which is called the Massachusetts General Court); New Hampshire uses the name "Supreme Court". Additionally the highest court in Maine is named the "Supreme Judicial Court". This similar terminology is probably a holdover from the time when Maine was part of Massachusetts. In Pennsylvania, Connecticut, Delaware, New Jersey, and New York, the highest courts formerly used variations of the term "Court of Errors," which indicated that the court's primary purpose was to correct the errors of lower courts.

== List of state and territorial supreme courts ==
=== States ===
Name and state	Mode of selection (Note: Refers only to the initial method of appointing a judge at the start of a new term.)	Term (years)	Retirement age	Number of members	Partisan breakdown (Note: Partisanship reflects the parties of the appointing governors, except in cases where a judge is registered with another party.)
Supreme Court of Alabama	Partisan election	6	70	9	9R–0D
Alaska Supreme Court	Missouri Plan	10	70	5	4R–1I
Arizona Supreme Court	Missouri Plan	6	70	7	6R–1D
Arkansas Supreme Court	Non-partisan election	8	–	7	
Supreme Court of California	Appointment by governor with the advice and consent of the Commission on Judicial Appointments	12	–	7	6D–1R
Colorado Supreme Court	Missouri Plan	10	72	7	7D–0R
Connecticut Supreme Court	Missouri Plan	8	70	7	7D–0R
Delaware Supreme Court	Appointment by governor with the advice and consent of the senate	12	–	5	3D–2R
Supreme Court of Florida	Missouri Plan	6	75	7	7R–0D
Supreme Court of Georgia	Non-partisan election	6	–	9	8R–1I
Supreme Court of Hawaii	Appointment by governor with the advice and consent of the senate	10	70	5	4D–0R, 1 Vacant
Idaho Supreme Court	Non-partisan election	6	–	5	4R–1I
Supreme Court of Illinois	Partisan election	10	–	7	5D–2R
Indiana Supreme Court	Missouri Plan	10	75	5	5R–0D
Iowa Supreme Court	Missouri Plan	8	72	7	7R–0D
Kansas Supreme Court	Missouri Plan	6	75	7	6D–1R
Kentucky Supreme Court	Non-partisan election	8	–	7	
Louisiana Supreme Court	Partisan election	10	70	7	4R–2D–1I
Maine Supreme Judicial Court	Appointment by governor with the advice and consent of the senate	7	–	7	7D–0R
Supreme Court of Maryland	Appointment by governor with the advice and consent of the senate	10	70	7	5R–2D
Massachusetts Supreme Judicial Court	Appointment by governor with the advice and consent of the Governor's Council	Life	70	7	5R–2D
Michigan Supreme Court	Semipartisan election	8	70	7	6D–1R
Minnesota Supreme Court	Non-partisan election	6	70	7	7D–0R
Supreme Court of Mississippi	Non-partisan election	8	–	9	7R–2I
Supreme Court of Missouri	Missouri Plan	12	70	7	5R–2D
Montana Supreme Court	Non-partisan election	8	–	7	
Nebraska Supreme Court	Missouri Plan	6	–	7	7R–0D
Supreme Court of Nevada	Non-partisan election	6	–	7	
New Hampshire Supreme Court	Appointment by governor with the advice and consent of the Executive Council	Life	70	5	5R–0D
Supreme Court of New Jersey	Appointment by governor with the advice and consent of the senate	7, then until 70	70	7	4D–2R–1I
New Mexico Supreme Court	Appointment by governor	8	–	5	5D–0R
New York Court of Appeals	Appointment by governor with the advice and consent of the senate	14	70	7	7D–0R
North Carolina Supreme Court	Partisan election	8	76	7	5R–2D
North Dakota Supreme Court	Non-partisan election	10	–	5	4R–1I
Supreme Court of Ohio	Partisan election	6	70	7	6R–1D
Supreme Court of Oklahoma Oklahoma Court of Criminal Appeals	Missouri Plan	6	–	9 5	6R–3D 4R–1D
Oregon Supreme Court	Non-partisan election	6	75	7	7D–0R
Supreme Court of Pennsylvania	Partisan election	10	75	7	4D–2R–1I
Rhode Island Supreme Court	Appointment by governor with the advice and consent of the General Assembly	Life	–	5	2D–2R, 1 Vacant
South Carolina Supreme Court	Appointment by General Assembly	10	72	5	
South Dakota Supreme Court	Missouri Plan	8	70	5	5R–0D
Tennessee Supreme Court	Appointment by governor with the advice and consent of the General Assembly	8	–	5	5R–0D
Supreme Court of Texas Texas Court of Criminal Appeals	Partisan election	6	74	9 9	9R–0D 9R–0D
Utah Supreme Court	Missouri Plan	10	75	7	7R–0D
Vermont Supreme Court	Appointment by governor with the advice and consent of the senate	6	90	5	4R–1D
Supreme Court of Virginia	Appointment by senate with the advice and consent of the House of Delegates	12	70	7	
Washington Supreme Court	Non-partisan election	6	75	9	6D–3I
Supreme Court of Appeals of West Virginia	Non-partisan election	12	–	5	4R–1D
Wisconsin Supreme Court	Non-partisan election	10	–	7	
Wyoming Supreme Court	Missouri Plan	8	70	5	5R–0D

=== Territories and federal district ===
Name and territory or federal district	Mode of selection	Term (Years)	Number of members	Retirement age
High Court of American Samoa	Appointment by the United States Secretary of the Interior (Justices) & appointment by the Governor of American Samoa (Judges)	During good behavior	8 (2 + 6)	
District of Columbia Court of Appeals	Appointment by the president of the United States with the advice and consent of the United States Senate	15	9	74
Supreme Court of Guam	Appointment by governor with the confirmation of the Legislature of Guam	During good behavior, subject to a retention election every ten years after his or her appointment	3	
Northern Mariana Islands Supreme Court	Appointment by governor with the confirmation of the Senate of the Northern Mariana Islands	8	3	
Supreme Court of Puerto Rico	Appointment by governor with the confirmation of the Senate of Puerto Rico	During good behavior. Mandatory retirement at the age of 70.	9	70
Supreme Court of the Virgin Islands	Appointment by governor with the confirmation of the Legislature of the Virgin Islands	Initial 10, with a term of good behavior upon reconfirmation	3	

== Tribal supreme courts ==
- Supreme Court of the Cherokee Nation of Oklahoma (formerly the Judicial Appeals Tribunal)
- Supreme Court of the Eastern Band of Cherokee Indians (North Carolina)
- Supreme Court of the Navajo Nation (formerly the "Court of Appeals")

== See also ==
- United States court of appeals
- United States district court
- United States federal courts
- Supreme Court of the United States
- List of female state supreme court justices
