= Colorado Criminal Defense Bar =

The Colorado Criminal Defense Bar (founded May 8, 1979) is a professional association of attorneys, investigators, and paralegals who represent persons accused of crime. The CCDB (as it is abbreviated) was created and established by attorneys Michael F. DiManna, Harold A. Haddon, Gary M. Jackson, Bryan Morgan, and Peter H. Ney, a judge of the Colorado Court of Appeals — all of Denver, Colorado — and William Gray of Boulder, Colorado (CCDB website). The "President's Council" comprises "former presidents of the CCDB and is chaired by the current President of the CCDB" ("President's Council", CCDB website).

== Mission statement ==
(From the CCDB website:)

The Colorado Criminal Defense Bar is dedicated to protecting the rights of the accused.
The organization is unalterably opposed to the death penalty and committed to providing training and support to the criminal defense community.

== President's Council ==
(From the CCDB website:)

The Council was created to maintain the institutional memory of the CCDB, to assist the President in policy matters with its collective experience, and to give additional insight to the Board of Directors. Council Members are ex officio members of the Board of Directors.

Past Presidents and Presidents Council Members

- Michael DiManna (1979–81), Dimanna & Jackson
- Lee D. Foreman (1981–82), Haddon, Morgan, Mueller, Jordan, Mackey & Foreman, PC
- Jonathan I. Olom (1982–83), (8/5/50 – 10/28/84)
- John M. Richilano (1983–84), Richilano & Gilligan, PC
- Jane S. Hazen (1984–85), Attorney at Law
- Larry S. Pozner (1985–86), Reilly Pozner LLP
- Norman R. Mueller (1986–87), Haddon, Morgan, Mueller, Jordan, Mackey & Foreman, PC
- Patrick J. Burke (1987–88), Patrick J. Burke, PC
- Jeffrey A. Springer (1988–89), Springer & Steinberg
- Saskia A. Jordan (1989–90), Haddon, Morgan, Mueller, Jordan, Mackey & Foreman, PC
- Robin Desmond (1990–91), Attorney at Law
- Michael R. Enwall (1991–92), Attorney at Law
- Jeffrey S. Paglicua (1992–93)
- David Kaplan (1993–94), Haddon, Morgan, Mueller, Jordan, Mackey & Foreman, PC
- Janine Yunker (1994–95), Federal Public Defender's Office
- G. Paul McCormick (1995–96), McCormick & Christoph, PC
- Daniel Recht (1996–97), Recht & Kornfeld, PC
- Forrest "Boogie" Lewis (1997–98), Forest W. Lewis, PC
- Edward Nugent (1998–99), Nugent & Palo, LLC
- Lindy Frolich (1999–2000), Alternate Defense Counsel
- Robert Pepin (2000–01), Federal Public Defender's Office
- Philip Cherner (2001–02), Attorney at Law
- James Castle (2002–03), Attorney at Law
- Carrie Thompson (2003–04), Colorado State Public Defender's Office
- Mark T. Langston (2004–05), Mark T. Langston, PC
- Patrick Ridley (2005–06), Ridley, McGreevy & Weisz, PC
- Thomas Hammond (2006–07), Attorney at Law
- Nancy Holton (2007-2008)
- Maureen O'Brien (2008-2009)
- Martin Stuart (2009-2010), McDermott Stuart & Ward LLP
- Sean McDermott (2013-2014), McDermott Stuart & Ward LLP
