= Colorado district courts =

Colorado district courts are the state trial courts of general jurisdiction in the U.S. state of Colorado, and are similar to what are referred to as "circuit courts" or other terms in other U.S. states.

They have original jurisdiction in civil cases with any amount in controversy; felony criminal cases, domestic relations, family law, and cases involving minors cases (including adoption, dependency, juvenile delinquency, and paternity actions), probate, and mental health cases.

The Colorado district courts are established by the Colorado Constitution, Article VI (Judicial Department), Sections 9–12. This part of the state constitution provides that "The district courts shall be trial courts of record with general jurisdiction, and shall have original jurisdiction in all civil, probate, and criminal cases, except as otherwise provided herein, and shall have such appellate jurisdiction as may be prescribed by law." The constitution also provides for a unique probate court in the consolidated city–county of Denver, which has exclusive jurisdiction in matters of probate and administration of estates.

Appeals from the district court go to the intermediate appellate court, the Colorado Court of Appeals, and in some cases go directly to Colorado Supreme Court, which is the state supreme court.

The lower Colorado county courts, which are courts of limited jurisdiction, handle civil cases under $25,000. Decisions from the county courts may be appealed to the district courts. Unlike a common practice where appeals are reviewed by a panel of at least three judges, the Colorado district courts act in dual capacity (i.e. as trial courts and as appellate courts), thus each appeal is decided by a single judge. Per C.R.S. 13-6-310(4) further appeal cannot be reviewed by the Court of Appeals, and is only upon writ of certiorari issued in the discretion of Colorado Supreme Court.

== Districts ==
There are 23 judicial districts, each encompassing one or more of Colorado's 64 counties. Five judicial districts have only one county within its jurisdiction, while one has seven small counties in its jurisdiction:

- 1st Judicial District – Gilpin, Jefferson
- 2nd Judicial District – Denver
- 3rd Judicial District – Huerfano, Las Animas
- 4th Judicial District – El Paso, Teller
- 5th Judicial District – Clear Creek, Eagle, Lake, Summit
- 6th Judicial District – Archuleta, La Plata, San Juan
- 7th Judicial District – Delta, Gunnison, Hinsdale, Montrose, Ouray, San Miguel
- 8th Judicial District – Jackson, Larimer
- 9th Judicial District – Garfield, Pitkin, Rio Blanco
- 10th Judicial District – Pueblo
- 11th Judicial District – Chaffee, Custer, Fremont, Park
- 12th Judicial District – Alamosa, Conejos, Costilla, Mineral, Rio Grande, Saguache
- 13th Judicial District – Kit Carson, Logan, Morgan, Phillips, Sedgwick, Washington, Yuma
- 14th Judicial District – Grand, Moffat, Routt
- 15th Judicial District – Baca, Cheyenne, Kiowa, Prowers
- 16th Judicial District – Bent, Crowley, Otero
- 17th Judicial District – Adams, Broomfield
- 18th Judicial District – Arapahoe
- 19th Judicial District – Weld
- 20th Judicial District – Boulder
- 21st Judicial District – Mesa
- 22nd Judicial District – Dolores, Montezuma
- 23rd Judicial District – Douglas, Elbert, Lincoln

== See also ==
- Judiciary of Colorado
- Government of Colorado
- Law of Colorado
- Same-sex marriage in Colorado
