= Robert E. Allen (politician) =

American politician

Robert Edward Allen (April 1, 1924 – November 22, 2014) was an American lawyer and legislator in Colorado.

Born in New York City, Allen was a lawyer and was the executor director for the city of Denver War on Poverty in 1965 and then was an assistant public defender in 1969. Allen was a Democrat. Allen served in the Colorado House of Representatives from 1951 to 1960 and then in the Colorado Senate from 1961 to 1964. He was majority leader of the House of Representatives from 1959 to 1960.
