= Domestic relations =

Category of family law

In the common law tradition, the law of domestic relations is a broad category that encompasses:

- divorce;
- property settlements;
- alimony, spousal support, or other maintenance;
- the establishment of paternity;
- the establishment or termination of parental rights;
- child support;
- child custody;
- visitation;
- adoption; and
- Emancipation of minors.

In some jurisdictions, guardianships, truancy, and matters related to juvenile delinquency are considered part of the law of domestic relations.

Many sorts of dispute fall into this broad category; many people who will not otherwise have any dealings during their lives with the judicial system have domestic relations disputes. Because of the volume of legal business generated by the law of domestic relations, a number of jurisdictions have established specialized courts of limited jurisdiction, sometimes called family courts, which hear domestic cases exclusively.

== See also ==
- Family Law Act (Alberta, Canada)
