= Mark Grebner =

American political consultant (born 1952)

Mark Grebner (born 1952) is an American politician, attorney, political consultant and psephologist from the state of Michigan.

== Education ==
Grebner is a resident of East Lansing, Michigan. He enrolled at Michigan State University as an Alumni Distinguished Scholar in 1970, completing a bachelor's degree in urban policy through MSU's James Madison College in 1981. He earned a Juris Doctor from the University of Michigan Law School.

== Political offices ==
He became active in voter registration efforts in East Lansing in 1971 following the ratification of the U.S. Constitution's 26th Amendment, which lowered the voting age from 21 to 18. He was an elected Ingham County Commissioner from 1977 to 2012, except 1981 to 84, and was selected by board colleagues as chairperson of the Board of Commissioners in 1997, 2001, 2005, and 2011. Grebner was on the county board for 36 years. As an Ingham County Commissioner he drafted a comprehensive county ethics policy, introduced a 9-1-1 system for the county, and developed a financial model that would support a unified public transit system for the county.

A Democrat, he represented a district on the Board of Commissioners that included a substantial portion of the MSU campus. In 2012, instead of running for re-election to the county board, Grebner challenged incumbent Patrick E. Lindemann, alleging fiscal mismanagement and cronyism, while Lindemann touted environmental protection and cost-savings. Lindemann defeated Grebner in the primary election and won re-election in the November general election.

In 2016, Grebner again ran for Ingham County Commissioner, this time as a resident of district 8, including precincts on the western edge of East Lansing. He was elected to a two-year term with 70 percent of the vote.

== Practical Political Consulting ==
Grebner is the president of Practical Political Consulting, a voter list and consulting firm which works mostly for Democrats in Michigan. In 1999, the firm expanded its operations to include Wisconsin. In an article about local and national campaign consultants in the early years of electronic data science, The Wall Street Journal described the work necessary to transform raw voter data into a mailing label targeted to specific voters: "Mr. Grebner painstakingly gathers lists of local voters from hundreds of Michigan township and municipal clerks, many of whom don't have computers and keep only hard-copy records. He enters the names in his battery of desktop computers, then matches them to addresses and other data." The New York Times in 2025 reported further on his voter lists, which assign a score to voters, predicting their likelihood of being a Democrat or Republican based on data from sources including which petitions were signed or partisan primary ballot was requested. The Times reported: "With a few keystrokes, Mr. Grebner can call up the score of just about any adult in Michigan. The rapper Marshall Bruce Mathers III, better known as Eminem, scores as 58 percent likely to vote Democratic."

Beginning in 2004, his firm conducted a large-scale experiment, called ETOV, to "shame" nonvoters into participating in elections. The results of the research were published in multiple academic peer-reviewed journals, including American Political Science Review. The journal Political Behavior described the origins of the experiment: "Mark Grebner, a political consultant in search of a cost effective way to increase voter turnout, developed a form of direct mail with information about whether they and their neighbors voted in recent elections. Grebner's intuition was that nonvoters are ashamed of abstaining but believe they can get away with it because no one knows whether in fact they voted." The effects of this study communicating voter history to neighbors, in research conducted in partnership with Yale University, was determined to be three times more effective at increasing voter turnout from other get-out-the-vote mailings.

== Grading the Profs ==
From 1974 to 2004, he published Grading the Profs, which reported student survey results on Michigan State University teaching faculty.

== Public image ==
Grebner is a commentator on politics and political issues, and is often interviewed on radio and television and quoted in news articles. He also writes on "Technical Politics" for the web site Michigan Liberal. He is described by public radio as "an ardent liberal known widely for his political savvy and his irreverent, often provocative commentary."

Grebner is noted for his iconoclastic and humorous political tactics. The New York Times wrote that "Calling Mr. Grebner eccentric would be too obvious." David Josar, of the Detroit News, calls him "super wonk". During his campaigns for election and re-election as county commissioner, he has used self-deprecating slogans such as "No Worse Than The Rest," "He May Be a Fool, But He's Our Fool," and (in a coupon book) "Buy One Politician, Get One Free." A humorous letter he sent to his constituents in 1986, announcing his plans for re-election, was reprinted in the "Readings" section of Harper's Magazine. In 2009 Grebner filed a lawsuit based on alterations to this Wikipedia page that he alleges were defamatory.

== Controversial political activities ==
Grebner has been involved in public controversies, typically as an advocate for liberal positions, for voting rights, for freedom of information, and for the interests of university students:

- To resolve a $4 million deficit, the county's 2009 budget cut 19 full-time positions, including six in the sheriff's department, prompting criticism of possible impact on public safety. Grebner, as chair of the finance committee, defended the budget, saying: "It won't be unbearable; other [counties] get by with a lot less."
- In 2007, he led a group of plaintiffs who sued to overturn the Michigan presidential primary law as unconstitutional. Judge Collette of Ingham County Circuit Court ruled in plaintiffs' favor, striking down the primary; that ruling was upheld by a three-judge panel of the Michigan Court of Appeals, but was reversed by the Michigan Supreme Court.
- Grebner and his firm have frequently been plaintiffs in Freedom of Information Act lawsuits in Michigan and Wisconsin.
- As county commissioner, Grebner strongly defended the county's practice of selling county animal control animals for medical and veterinary research, and called animal rights activists "fanatics".
- Grebner has advocated measures to restrict smoking in workplaces in the county.
- An essay Grebner wrote about methods to increase voter turnout suggested a focus on jail inmates held before trial.
