= State court (United States) =

Court with jurisdiction over disputes with some connection to a U.S. state

In the United States, a state court is a court of law with jurisdiction over disputes with some connection to a U.S. state. State courts handle the overwhelming majority of civil and criminal cases in the United States; the United States federal courts are far smaller in terms of both personnel and caseload, and handle different types of cases. The number of cases filed in state courts each year surpasses the number of cases filed in federal courts by a factor of over two hundred. States often provide their trial courts with general jurisdiction (the hearing of all matters in which personal jurisdiction exists and which are not committed to another court) and state trial courts regularly have concurrent jurisdiction with federal courts. Federal courts are courts of limited jurisdiction and their subject-matter jurisdiction arises only under federal law.

Each state "is free to organize its courts as it sees fit," and consequently, "no two states have identical court structures." Generally, state courts are common law courts, and apply their respective state laws and procedures to decide cases. They are organized pursuant to and apply the law in accordance with their state's constitution, state statutes, and binding decisions of courts in their state court hierarchy. Where applicable, they may also apply federal law, or need to make a choice of law from another jurisdiction. Generally, a single judicial officer, usually called a judge, exercises original jurisdiction by presiding over contested criminal or civil actions which culminate in trials, which may include empaneling a jury, although most matters stop short of reaching trial. The decisions of lower courts may be reviewed by a panel of a state intermediate appellate court.

Typically, a State Supreme Court, also known as the court of last resort, is the highest court that cases within a state's judicial system can be appealed to and is always the final authority on the interpretation of state laws and state constitutions. State and federal courts operate as separate judicial systems, and state court rulings cannot be appealed to federal district courts, federal courts of appeals or the United States Supreme Court.

== Types of state courts ==
=== Trial court ===
Cases in state courts begin in a trial court where lawsuits and criminal cases are filed and evidence is eventually presented if a case proceeds to a hearing or trial. Trials in these courts are often held only after extensive pretrial procedures that in more than 90% of cases lead to a default judgment in a civil case, an agreed resolution settling the case or plea bargain resolving a criminal case, or pretrial resolution of the case by a judge either on the merits or on procedural grounds.

On the one hand, the United States has a well-deserved reputation as one of the most litigious places in the world: "American society is somewhat exceptional not only in the frequency with which Americans resort to court to settle their disputes but, more significantly, the scope and importance of social and economic issues that are confided to the private litigation process". On the other hand, very few cases actually go to a jury verdict and a final judgment, let alone an appeal that results in a published appellate opinion. A 2015 empirical study examined 8,038 cases that went to trial in state-level trial courts and found that only 24 (0.3%) resulted in a judicial opinion from the state supreme court. In other words, the reported case law studied in American law schools does not reflect the way the vast majority of cases are handled and resolved—by "bargain[ing] [in the] shadow of the law".

Territory outside of any state in the United States, such as the District of Columbia or American Samoa, often has a court system established under federal or territorial law which substitutes for a state court system and is distinct from the ordinary federal court system.

State trial courts are usually located in a courthouse, which is often in the county seat. Even when state trial courts include more than one county in a judicial district, it is not uncommon for the state trial court to hold regular sessions at each county seat in its jurisdiction and function from the point of view of litigants as if it were a county-based court.

=== Appellate court ===
If one of the litigants is unsatisfied with the decision of the lower court, the matter may be taken up on appeal. However, an acquittal in a criminal trial cannot be appealed by the state because of the Fifth Amendment protection against double jeopardy. Usually, an intermediate appellate court, if there is one in that state, often called the state court of appeals, will review the decision of the trial court. If still unsatisfied, the litigant can appeal to the highest appellate court in the state, which is usually called the state supreme court and is usually located in or near the state's capital city. Appellate courts in the United States, unlike their civil law counterparts, are generally not permitted to correct mistakes concerning the facts of the case on appeal, only mistakes of law, or findings of fact with no support in the trial court record.

=== Courts of inferior jurisdiction ===
Many states have courts of limited jurisdiction (inferior jurisdiction), presided over by, for example, a magistrate or justice of the peace who hears criminal arraignments and tries petty offenses and small civil cases. Appeals from courts of limited jurisdiction are frequently sent to state trial courts of general jurisdiction rather than to an appellate court. As of 2014, the United States had over 13,500 courts of limited jurisdiction. Most of these courts were small one-judge courts, meaning that these courts were staffed by approximately 18,500 judicial officers.

Larger cities often have city courts (also known as municipal courts) which hear traffic offenses and violations of city ordinances; in some states, such as New York, these courts have slightly broader jurisdiction and can also handle small claims and misdemeanors. Other courts of limited jurisdiction include alderman's courts, police court, mayor's courts, recorder's courts, county courts, probate courts, municipal courts, juvenile courts, courts of claims, courts of common pleas, family courts, small claims courts, tax courts, water courts (present in some western states such as Colorado and Montana), and workers' compensation courts (Rhode Island).

Lawrence M. Friedman has described courts of limited jurisdiction as "the bargain basement of justice," where procedures are often informal and "slapdash" and the quality of justice is poor. In states that still use justices of the peace or equivalent judicial officers, many judges of courts of limited jurisdiction are laypersons who never attended law school or passed a bar examination. As of 2020, 26 states still allowed such nonlawyers to preside as judges in courts of limited jurisdiction. The low pay and low status of such positions tends to attract candidates with terrible educational qualifications; a 1976 survey found that somewhere between one-third and one-half of judges of courts of limited jurisdiction in California had not even completed high school. There is widespread anecdotal and empirical evidence that lay judges are prone to ignoring the law and issuing arbitrary rulings.

The issues that inevitably result from the lack of a law-trained judge are compounded by the complete absence of lawyers on both sides of a case in some of the poorest states. For example, in South Carolina, "one of the poorest states in the country", a criminal defendant prosecuted in a court of limited jurisdiction in that state may be arrested, prosecuted, tried, and convicted without ever encountering a single lawyer. The police in South Carolina often act as the prosecutor.

Courts of limited jurisdiction should not be confused with the administrative courts seen in other countries. The United States does not use administrative courts, as a result of the strict separation of powers imposed by the United States Constitution. Instead, at both the federal and state levels, administrative law judges (ALJs) preside over tribunals within executive branch agencies (although their decisions can usually be appealed to real judges in the judicial branch). In state governments, ALJs handle matters such as driver's license revocations, workers' compensation claims, unemployment insurance claims, and land use disputes.

=== Superior court ===
All these courts are distinguished from courts of general jurisdiction (also known as "superior jurisdiction"), which are the default type of trial court that can hear any case which is not required to be first heard in a court of limited jurisdiction. Most such cases are civil cases involving large sums of money or criminal cases arising from serious felonies like rape and murder. Typically, felonies are handled in general jurisdiction courts, while misdemeanors and other lesser offenses are handled in inferior jurisdiction courts. Unlike most European courts (in both common law and civil law countries), American state courts do not usually have a separate court that handles serious crimes; jurisdiction lies with the court that handles all other felony cases in a given county.

Many state courts that handle criminal cases also have separate divisions or judges assigned to handle certain types of cases, known as "problem-solving courts". Problem-solving courts are part of a larger reform effort known as therapeutic jurisprudence which attempts to address underlying issues which lead to the same people repeatedly appearing in criminal courts, in order to reduce recidivism. Examples of such courts include drug court, domestic violence court, and mental health court.

All states have courts of general jurisdiction, but only some have courts of limited jurisdiction. Courts of general jurisdiction tend to be better funded, better staffed, more professional, more dignified, and more solemn than courts of limited jurisdiction. They also tend to have jurisdiction over larger geographical areas and more people. As of 2014, the United States had approximately 2,000 state trial courts of general jurisdiction. These courts were staffed by approximately 11,000 judges.

A few states like California have unified all courts of general and inferior jurisdiction to make the judicial process more efficient. In such courts, there may be divisions that specialize in hearing particular types of proceedings, but from the perspective of the judges, these are mere administrative assignments. In such courts, every judge is deemed to be "qualified to hear every type of proceeding, enhancing administrative flexibility and ending the possibility of a judgment being invalidated because it was heard in the wrong court". As of 2014, the six jurisdictions which had fully unified all trial courts and no longer used courts of limited jurisdiction were California, Iowa, Illinois, Minnesota, the District of Columbia, and Puerto Rico.

== State court judges ==
Unlike federal courts, where judges are presidential appointees confirmed by the U.S. Senate serving life terms of office, the vast majority of states have some judges who are elected, while some judges are appointed. The methods of judicial appointment vary widely.

The American habit of electing state court judges originates with Alexander Hamilton and Federalist No. 78, in which Hamilton brought about a fundamental reconceptualization of the idea of separation of powers with respect to the judiciary. Before Hamilton, both English and American people had thought of judges as mere appendages of royal authority, and that a government had only two branches, the executive and the legislative. Hamilton implied and others later developed the idea that American judges were coequal to legislatures and executives in their responsibility to carry out the people's will (popular sovereignty), which extended to the power to make law (through case law). Therefore, if the judiciary was a coequal third branch of government, and the judges were the people's agents, then like the other branches, they ought to be elected by the people. However, problems with partisan judicial elections led many states to later adopt judicial appointment systems, while also using retention elections as a check on appointed judges.

State court judges are usually distinguished attorneys who have had some political involvement, who are pursuing second careers on the bench. But a small number of state court judges, particularly in limited jurisdiction trial courts in rural areas or small towns, are nonlawyers, who are often elected to their posts.

A disproportionate share of state court judges previously served as prosecutors, or less commonly as criminal defense attorneys or trial lawyers, although no particular background as an attorney is required to serve as a judge. The judiciary is not a separate profession in the American legal system as it is in many civil law jurisdictions. While in many civil law jurisdictions a common judicial career involves an entry-level assignment in an inferior court followed by promotions to more senior courts over the course of a career, no U.S. court system makes experience in an inferior judicial position a prerequisite to higher judicial office.

While many countries consider criminal prosecutors to be part of the judicial branch, in the United States, all criminal prosecutors are considered part of the executive branch. The fact that all attorneys admitted to the practice of law are somewhat confusingly called "officers of the court" in U.S. legal practice is a legal fiction that calls attention to the special professional ethical obligations that all lawyers have to the court, and does not mean that all lawyers are employees or agents of the judicial branch.

State court judges are typically paid less, have smaller staffs, and handle larger caseloads than their counterparts in the federal judiciary.

One indicator of the significant disparity in prestige between the federal judiciary and the state judiciaries is the number of judges who go from one to the other. A 2017 study found that of the 3,580 judges then listed in the Biographical Directory of Federal Judges, 911 judges went directly from a state court to a federal court, but only 14 went the other way. The study was expressly limited to analyzing direct movements between judicial systems and did not include judges who had taken other types of jobs when not serving in judicial positions.

== How many and what level ==
One of the largest areas of interstate divergence goes to how states conceive of their courts as one court or many courts, and whether their courts are part of the state government itself, or part of local governments (which are creatures of state law but usually enjoy some autonomy from the state government).

One difference is whether the state trial court of general jurisdiction is regarded as a single entity or a set of many entities. Some states conceptualize of that court as a single unified court of statewide jurisdiction that merely happens to sit in particular counties or districts, while other states have a set of separate and coequal courts, one for each county or district. The most extreme exponent of the first position is New York, which has a single Supreme Court that sits as a trial court with general jurisdiction throughout the entire state. The most extreme exponent of the second position is Texas, where each trial court is constituted as a legally distinct entity with a single judge. The language in the Texas Constitution requiring one judge per court was not fixed until 1985. Thus, an urban courthouse in Texas normally houses multiple single-judge trial courts sharing concurrent jurisdiction over the same county.

Another difference is whether state trial courts, especially courts of limited jurisdiction, are created and funded as components of state government or local governments. There are a great many hybrid systems which lie in between. State courts which operate as part of the state government are more likely to have centralized court administration and oversight, which promotes professionalism and uniformity of procedure. Local courts which operate as parts of local governments tend to see themselves as components of local communities, rather than as agents of the state government impartially applying state law. Local courts are more likely to be integrated into local political machines and are more sensitive to local politics.

The most significant danger which arises from the latter arrangement is that in the United States, local governments are also usually responsible for most of the other components of criminal justice, like police, prosecutors, and jails. This clear conflict of interest has resulted in the development of predatory criminal justice systems more focused on sustaining themselves on revenue from excessive penal fines than ensuring the fair administration of justice or protecting the rights of the accused.

== Differences among the states ==
The foregoing summary is only a very rough generalization. There are a great many "oddities" and "extra wrinkles" from one state court system to the next, although the tendency in most states has been towards rationalization and simplification: "the further back in history one goes, the more confused the situation gets".

- Delaware, Mississippi, New Jersey, Tennessee and Wyoming make a distinction between a "court of law" and a "court of equity" (chancery court). For the most part in the American legal system, while the distinction between law and equity still has some legal consequences, separate court systems are not maintained at the federal level or in other states.
- Texas and Oklahoma have separate courts of last resort for criminal cases and other cases. In all other states, there is a single court of last resort. While collateral attacks on criminal convictions, such as state level habeas corpus petitions, are usually considered to be technically civil cases, because they are not brought by a prosecutor and do not seek to convict someone of a crime, these suits are, in both states, appealed to the criminal court of last resort, rather than the civil court of last resort.
- The highest appellate court in New York and the only appellate court in the District of Columbia, is called Court of Appeals rather than "Supreme Court." In New York, the Supreme Court is the court of general jurisdiction, and has both county trial divisions and four regional Appellate Divisions that serve as the intermediate appellate courts in the New York judiciary.
- The courts of Louisiana and the Commonwealth of Puerto Rico are organized under a civil law model with significantly different procedures from those of the courts in all other states and the District of Columbia, which are based upon the traditions of the common law of England. The court process used in these jurisdictions differs considerably from that used in the federal courts and the courts of other states in non-criminal cases. However, the U.S. Constitution requires these jurisdictions to use procedures similar to those of other U.S. jurisdictions in criminal cases.
- A small number of states lack an intermediate appellate court. In those states, litigants in general jurisdiction courts usually have the right to appeal their cases directly to the state supreme court. One of the great informal traditions of American law is that everyone is generally entitled to at least one appeal of right on the merits from an adverse judgment, but the U.S. Supreme Court has repeatedly ruled that appeal is not a federal constitutional right, meaning that states are not obligated to provide it. Many states have rules that permit certain cases such as death penalty cases and election cases to be appealed directly to the state supreme court, even though most civil cases must be appealed first to an intermediate appellate court.
- In Utah, civil cases are appealed directly to the state supreme court, which then has the power to refer the case instead to an intermediate appellate court, rather than being appealed first to an intermediate appellate court and then to a state supreme court. Oklahoma has a similar structure: civil cases are appealed directly to the Supreme Court, which can refer them down to the Courts of Civil Appeals. (Criminal cases are appealed to the Court of Criminal Appeals and there is no intermediate court for such cases).

== Administration ==
In most, but not all states (California and New York are significant exceptions), the state supreme court or a related administrative body has the power to write the rules of procedure that govern the courts through a rulemaking process. In a minority of the states, criminal and civil procedure are largely governed by state statutes.

Most states model their general jurisdiction trial court rules closely upon the Federal Rules of Civil Procedure with modifications to address types of cases that come up only in state practice (like traffic violations), and model their professional ethics rules closely upon models drafted by the American Bar Association with minor modifications. A minority of states, however, have idiosyncratic procedural rules, often based on the Field Code in place in many states before the Federal Rules of Civil Procedure were adopted. Importantly, neither California nor New York state follow federal models.

Typically, state trial courts of limited jurisdiction have generally similar rules to state trial courts of general jurisdiction, but are stripped of rules applicable to special cases like class actions and many pretrial procedures (such as out-of-court discovery in the absence of a court order).

Most state supreme courts also have general supervisory authority over the state court system. In this capacity they are responsible, for example, for making budget requests and administrative management decisions for the court system as a whole. In most states, such administrative authority has been transferred or delegated to a state judicial council which includes members of lower courts.

=== State court regulation of lawyers ===
All state supreme courts are the de jure primary regulatory body for all lawyers in their state and determine who can practice law and when lawyers are sanctioned for violations of professional ethical rules, which are generally also put in place as state court rules. (Most federal courts that sit within a particular state usually require lawyers seeking admission to their bars to first obtain admission to that particular state's bar). In all states, such powers have been delegated either to the state bar association or various committees, commissions, or offices directly responsible to the state supreme court. The result is that such subordinate entities generally have original jurisdiction over lawyer admissions and discipline, nearly all de facto lawyer regulation takes place through such entities, and the state supreme court becomes directly involved only when petitioned to not ratify the decisions made by some subordinate entity in its name.

== Relationship to federal courts ==
As the U.S. Supreme Court recognized in Erie Railroad Co. v. Tompkins (1938), no part of the federal Constitution actually grants federal courts the power to directly decide the content of state law. Clause 1 of Section 2 of Article Three of the United States Constitution describes the scope of federal judicial power, but only extended it to "the Laws of the United States" and not the laws of the several or individual states.

The vast majority of the time, the State Supreme Court is the highest court for appeals for state level lawsuits. In limited circumstances, a state lawsuit may be appealed to the United States Supreme Court, but the plaintiff must choose to frame the question in their lawsuit as both a federal and state question before the Court will even agree to hear it. Because of the aforementioned silence in the US Constitution (as well as Section 25 of the Judiciary Act of 1789 and successor sections), the United States Supreme Court cannot and never reviews decisions of state courts that depend entirely on the resolution of a state law or state constitutional issue. The nationwide significance of a case, or the existence of federal laws or Supreme Court precedents addressing similar subjects, does not by itself establish grounds for United States Supreme Court of a state lawsuit. State court judgments resting on state laws on state constitutions are generally beyond the U.S. Supreme Court's appellate jurisdiction. Since there really is no federal overlap in the vast majority of state cases, the decision of the State Supreme Court is effectively final, as any petition for certiorari to the U.S. Supreme Court will be summarily denied without comment.

== Nomenclature ==
The following table notes the names of the courts in the states and territories of the United States. Listed are the principal trial courts of general jurisdiction, the principal intermediate appellate courts, and the state supreme courts.

Courts are described below in the singular when state law defines only one statewide court of that name (whose judges may be assigned to particular counties, circuits, or districts, but still remain part of a single court). Courts are described below in the plural when they are defined by state law as a set of separate courts, each exercising jurisdiction only over a specifically defined territory within the state.

In some states, the number of county-based courts does not exactly match the number of actual counties in the state. This occurs when a single court has jurisdiction over more than one county.

State	Trial court of general jurisdiction	Intermediate appellate court	State supreme court
Alabama	Circuit Courts (41 judicial districts)	Court of Civil Appeals; Court of Criminal Appeals	Supreme Court
Alaska	Superior Court (4 districts)	Court of Appeals	Supreme Court
Arizona	Superior Court (15 counties)	Court of Appeals (2 divisions)	Supreme Court
Arkansas	Circuit Courts (23 judicial circuits)	Court of Appeals	Supreme Court
California	Superior Courts (58 counties)	Courts of Appeal (6 appellate districts)	Supreme Court
Colorado	District Courts (22 judicial districts)	Court of Appeals	Supreme Court
Connecticut	Superior Court (13 judicial districts)	Appellate Court	Supreme Court
Delaware	Superior Court; Court of Chancery	(none)	Supreme Court
District of Columbia	Superior Court	(none)	Court of Appeals
Florida	Circuit Courts (20 judicial circuits)	District Courts of Appeal (5 districts)	Supreme Court
Georgia	Superior Courts (49 judicial circuits)	Court of Appeals	Supreme Court
Hawaii	Circuit Courts (4 circuits)	Intermediate Court of Appeals	Supreme Court
Idaho	District Courts (7 judicial districts)	Court of Appeals	Supreme Court
Illinois	Circuit Courts (23 judicial circuits)	Appellate Court (5 districts)	Supreme Court
Indiana	Circuit Courts (91 districts)	Court of Appeals (5 districts)	Supreme Court
Iowa	District Courts (8 districts)	Court of Appeals	Supreme Court
Kansas	District Courts (31 districts)	Court of Appeals	Supreme Court
Kentucky	Circuit Court (57 circuits)	Court of Appeals	Supreme Court
Louisiana	District Courts (42 districts)	Circuit Courts of Appeal (5 circuits)	Supreme Court
Maine	Superior Court	(none)	Supreme Judicial Court
Maryland	Circuit Courts (8 judicial circuits)	Appellate Court	Supreme Court
Massachusetts	Superior Court (14 divisions)	Appeals Court	Supreme Judicial Court
Michigan	Circuit Courts (57 circuits)	Court of Appeals	Supreme Court
Minnesota	District Court (10 districts)	Court of Appeals	Supreme Court
Mississippi	Circuit Courts (22 districts); Chancery Courts (20 districts)	Court of Appeals	Supreme Court
Missouri	Circuit Courts (45 circuits)	Court of Appeals (3 districts)	Supreme Court
Montana	District Courts (22 judicial districts)	(none)	Supreme Court
Nebraska	District Courts (12 districts)	Court of Appeals	Supreme Court
Nevada	District Courts (10 districts)	Court of Appeals	Supreme Court
New Hampshire	Superior Court	(none)	Supreme Court
New Jersey	Superior Court (15 vicinages)	Superior Court, Appellate Division	Supreme Court
New Mexico	District Courts (13 judicial districts)	Court of Appeals	Supreme Court
New York	Supreme Court (12 judicial districts); County Court (57 counties)	Supreme Court, Appellate Division (4 departments)	Court of Appeals
North Carolina	Superior Court (46 districts)	Court of Appeals	Supreme Court
North Dakota	District Courts (7 judicial districts)	(none)	Supreme Court
Ohio	Courts of Common Pleas (88 counties)	District Courts of Appeals (12 districts)	Supreme Court
Oklahoma	District Courts (26 judicial districts)	Court of Civil Appeals	Supreme Court; Court of Criminal Appeals
Oregon	Circuit Courts (27 judicial districts)	Court of Appeals	Supreme Court
Pennsylvania	Courts of Common Pleas (60 judicial districts)	Commonwealth Court; Superior Court	Supreme Court
Rhode Island	Superior Court	(none)	Supreme Court
South Carolina	Circuit Court (16 circuits)	Court of Appeals	Supreme Court
South Dakota	Circuit Courts (7 circuits)	(none)	Supreme Court
Tennessee	Circuit Courts (31 judicial districts); Criminal Courts (31 judicial districts); Chancery Courts (31 judicial districts)	Court of Appeals (3 grand divisions); Court of Criminal Appeals (3 grand divisions)	Supreme Court
Texas	District Courts (457 districts)	Courts of Appeals (14 districts)	Supreme Court; Court of Criminal Appeals
Utah	District Courts (8 districts)	Court of Appeals	Supreme Court
Vermont	Superior Court; District Court; Family Court	(none)	Supreme Court
Virginia	Circuit Courts (31 judicial circuits)	Court of Appeals	Supreme Court
Washington	Superior Courts (39 counties)	Court of Appeals (3 divisions)	Supreme Court
West Virginia	Circuit Courts (31 judicial circuits)	(none)	Supreme Court of Appeals
Wisconsin	Circuit Courts (10 judicial administrative districts)	Court of Appeals (4 districts)	Supreme Court
Wyoming	District Courts (9 districts)	(none)	Supreme Court
American Samoa	High Court, Trial Division	(none)	High Court, Appellate Division
Guam	Superior Court	(none)	Supreme Court
Northern Mariana Islands	Superior Court	(none)	Supreme Court
Puerto Rico	Superior Courts (13 districts)	Court of Appeals	Supreme Court
U.S. Virgin Islands	Superior Court (2 divisions)	(none)	Supreme Court

== See also ==
- Courts of the United States

== External links and references ==
- 2004 United States Justice Department Report
- National Center for State Courts, including State Court Structure Charts
- Gavel2Gavel's State Court web directory, an ad-supported website
- Federal Court Statistics 2002
- Census of State Court Organization Bureau of Justice Statistics
- Colorado Court Statistics 2002
- "Statistical Abstract of the United States".
