= Larry Pozner =

American lawyer and author, and lecturer

Larry Pozner is an American lawyer and author, and lecturer. He is the founding partner of the law firm Reilly Pozner LLP and is considered an expert on cross-examination, civil litigation, and criminal defense for high-profile cases. He is the co-author of Cross Examination: Science and Techniques, published by LexisNexis, and used as text in law schools.

== Early life and education ==
Pozner earned his undergraduate degree in Business Administration from the University of Colorado in 1969, and his J.D. degree from the University of California, Hastings College of Law in 1973.

== Career ==
He began his career as a public defender with the Office of the Colorado State Public Defender. He went into private practice in 1985 and was a founder of the criminal defense law firm Pozner Hutt Kaplan PC. He founded Denver-based law firm Reilly Pozner LLP in 2000, originally under the name Hoffman Reilly Pozner & Williamson.

== Significant cases ==
=== Insurance and financial cases ===
Pozner represented the Variable Annuity Life Insurance Company (VALIC) on behalf of AIG to enforce non-compete agreements with former employees of the life insurance company. The former employees were attempting to recruit financial advisers employed by VALIC. Pozner was national counsel for the company and filed temporary restraining orders and injunctions to protect the company's trade secrets. He was also one of AIG's lead lawyers in its objection to Bank of America's settlement of claims arising out of the subprime mortgage crisis in the U.S.

=== Denver Broncos ownership dispute ===
Pozner represented Pat Bowlen in a lawsuit brought against him by previous Denver Broncos owner Edgar Kaiser. Kaiser had previously sold his share of the team to Bowlen in 1984. Kaiser brought suit against Bowlen after he offered former Broncos quarterback John Elway a share of the team. Kaiser contented that he had first right of refusal based on the 1984 sale and agreement, and brought suits against Bowlen in both state and federal courts. The case proceeded to the United States 10th Circuit Court of Appeals, ultimately deciding in favor of Bowlen. Pozner also represented the Broncos during a lawsuit brought against them by two season ticket holders, alleging violation of the Broncos' lease with the city requiring them to keep ticket prices less than the league average. The court granted summary disposition to the Broncos and threw out the lawsuit against the team.

== Teaching and writing career ==
Pozner has written opinion pieces for The New York Times and The Denver Post.

He served as an adjunct professor at the Sturm College of Law, where he was voted Best Professor for 1981–1982.

=== Cross Examination: Science and Techniques ===
The second edition of his book Cross Examination: Science and Techniques came out on December 2, 2004. The book focuses on cross-examination methods, techniques and principals used help attorneys develop cross-examination skills that are critical to trial success.

== Awards and recognition ==
- Ranked in the international publication Chambers USA since 2007 in the area of Colorado, Litigation: White-Collar Crime & Government Investigations
- Named a "Colorado Super Lawyer" since 2006
- He was recognized as Lawyer of the Year for Denver Criminal Defense Non-White Collar by The Best Lawyers in America, and has been listed in this publication since 1987.
- He has been rated AV Preeminent by Martindale-Hubbell, a rating he has held since 2001.
