= Retention election =

Referendum on retaining an officeholder

A retention election or retention referendum is a referendum where voters are asked if an office holder, usually a judge, should be allowed to continue in that office. The judge is removed from office if a majority of votes are cast against retention. Retention elections are held periodically, usually at the same time as a general election.

A judicial retention vote differs from a regular election in that voters are not asked to choose from a list of candidates — the judges on the ballot do not have opponents. Rather, the voter chooses between electing the incumbent judge to a further term in office (i.e. voting in favor of "retention") or voting against. They are usually nonpartisan, as the judge's party affiliation, if any, typically is not listed on the ballot. A judge is deemed to have been retained if ballots cast in favor of retention outnumber those against.

By way of example, judicial retention elections are used in the U.S. state of Illinois. In the 2008 general election, the voters of Cook County, Illinois were asked to vote on the following:

Shall each of the persons listed be retained in office as Judge of the Appellate Court, First Judicial District?

Michael J. Gallagher, Yes or No

Margaret Stanton McBride, Yes or No

Additional instructions on the ballot made clear that "no judge listed is running against any other judge" and that voters were able to vote "yes" on both, "no" on both, or "yes" on one and "no" on the other.

== Voter behavior and retention patterns ==
Judges standing for retention are overwhelmingly successful. Scholars have long documented that defeats in retention are rare. In their comprehensive study of 3,912 trial and appellate court retention elections across ten states from 1964 to 1994, Aspin, Hall, Bax and Montoya found that “detailed analysis of defeated judges indicates that regular retention voters quickly remove judges from the bench without any negative consequences for other judges on the ballot.” The same study reported that the mean affirmative vote for retention candidates over that thirty-year period was 74.9 percent, suggesting that these cases are, on average, not especially competitive. This high success rate compares favorably with outcomes in contested judicial elections. Hall found that from 1980 to 1995, incumbents in nonpartisan elections were defeated at a rate of 8.6 percent, and those in partisan elections at 18.8 percent.

Despite appearing on the same ballot as other elections, retention contests suffer from substantial ballot roll-off, where voters skip judicial questions while voting in other races. Research examining 1,864 trial court retention elections between 1964 and 1984 found a mean roll-off of 36.2 percent, meaning more than one-third of voters did not cast ballots in judicial retention elections despite participating in other contests on the same ballot. Hall and Aspin attributed this roll-off primarily to district population size, and noted that some voters abstained due to lack of information about judges while others did so because the uncontested format offered no meaningful choice.

Voter information levels significantly influence participation in retention elections. Studies have found that voters with no information about judges are most likely to abstain from retention questions, while those with some information about judicial performance are most likely to vote in favor of retention. Griffin and Horan found that fewer than half of “yes” voters cited substantive reasons such as job performance or personal knowledge of the judge, the majority gave reasons based on lack of information or could offer no reason at all.

== Notable contested elections ==
While judges standing for retention typically face minimal opposition and are reelected at rates exceeding 95 percent, several high-profile retention campaigns have resulted in judges being removed from office or surviving close votes. These contested elections often center on controversial judicial decisions, particularly those involving politically divisive issues such as capital punishment, same-sex marriage, or abortion.

The most significant removal of judges through retention elections occurred in California in 1986, when Chief Justice Rose Bird and Associate Justices Cruz Reynoso and Joseph Grodin were voted off the Supreme Court of California. All three justices were removed by substantial margins: Bird received 34 percent support, while Reynoso and Grodin received 40 and 43 percent, respectively. The coordinated campaign against the justices focused on their death penalty voting records, with Bird having voted to overturn all 61 capital cases that came before her during her tenure from 1977 to 1986. More than 10 million dollars was spent on California’s Supreme Court retention, making it one of the most expensive judicial campaigns in American history at that time.The removals marked the first time any California appellate judge had failed a retention vote.

In Iowa in 2010, three Iowa Supreme Court justices were removed following the court’s unanimous decision in Varnum v. Brien, which legalized same-sex marriage in the state. Chief Justice Marsha Ternus and Justices David Baker and Michael Streit each received approximately 45 percent support.The campaign against the justices, organized by religious and social conservative groups, drew significant funding from out-of-state organizations. These were the first Iowa Supreme Court justices ever removed through a retention election since the state adopted its merit selection system in 1962. The 2010 retention election also saw unusually high voter participation on judicial questions, with approximately 87 percent of Iowa voters marking their ballots for or against the justices, compared to typical rates of much lower engagement.

More recently, retention elections have become increasingly contested, though most judges continue to be retained. In Pennsylvania’s 2025 retention elections, three Supreme Court of Pennsylvania justices, Christine Donohue, Kevin Dougherty, and David Wecht, faced organized opposition largely related to the court’s decisions on women’s reproductive rights. Despite unprecedented campaign spending exceeding 18 million dollars and involvement from national political groups, all three justices were retained. Only one Pennsylvania Supreme Court justice, Russell Nigro in 2005, has ever lost a retention election, following backlash over a controversial legislative pay raise.

== History ==
=== California ===
In 1934, Judicial retention elections were first used by California's state court system to fill vacancies. (Text of the law may be seen below.) These retention elections served as an alternative to elections which were previously contested. After appointment by the governor and confirmation by the Commissioner on Judicial Appointments, an incumbent judge would appear on the ballot without an opponent and voters would vote for or against. Judges receiving a majority of votes would be elected to serve.

California State Constitution: Article VI, Section 16 d.

(1) Within 30 days before August 16 preceding the expiration of the judge's term, a judge of the Supreme Court or a court of appeal may file a declaration of candidacy to succeed to the office presently held by the judge. If the declaration is not filed, the Governor before September 16 shall nominate a candidate. At the next general election, only the candidate so declared or nominated may appear on the ballot, which shall present the question whether the candidate shall be elected. The candidate shall be elected upon receiving a majority of the votes on the question.

In 1937, the American Bar Association endorsed retention elections for judges.

=== Missouri Plan ===
Growing distaste of politics and corruption affecting the gubernatorial appointments of judges brought about the reform when selecting judges. In 1940, the state of Missouri adopted the Missouri Plan, which contained a judicial retention process similar to that of California. This plan which is also known as the merit system, was proposed by Albert M. Kales, co-founder of the American Judicature Society. Under the Missouri Plan, judges were to be nominated by a council of lawyers and laypersons. A list of candidates would then go to the governor, who would choose a candidate. It was noted that the Missouri Plan needed a form of public accountability so it was decided that, after an election cycle had passed, the judicial candidate would be subject to periodic, public retention elections.

== Usage ==
=== Japan ===
The Constitution of Japan, drafted by the U.S. authorities during the occupation of Japan following World War II, effected an arrangement for justices of the Supreme Court of Japan.

=== United States ===
Retention elections are used in many U.S. state court systems to retain trial court and appellate court judges. The following 20 states use retention elections for at least some judges:

- Alaska^{1,2}
- Arizona^{1,2} (some trial judges are elected).
- California^{1}
- Colorado^{1,2}
- Florida^{1}
- Illinois^{1,2}
- Indiana^{1,2} (some trial judges are elected).
- Iowa^{1,2}
- Kansas^{1,2} (some trial judges are elected).
- Maryland^{1}
- Missouri^{1,2} (some trial judges are elected).
- Nebraska^{1,2}
- New Mexico^{1,2} (57% 'yes' votes needed for retention)
- Oklahoma^{1}
- Pennsylvania^{1,2}
- South Dakota^{1}
- Tennessee^{1}
- Utah^{1,2}
- Wyoming^{1,2}
- Pennsylvania^{1,2}

^{1} Appellate court retention election

^{2} Trial court retention election

== See also ==
- Judicial elections in Pennsylvania
- Category:Judicial elections
