= Judicial nominating commission =

A judicial nominating commission (also judicial nominating committee, judicial nominating board) in the United States, is a body used by some U.S. states to recommend or select potential justices and judges for appointments by state governments.

Judicial nominating commissions are often established by the state constitution as part of merit selection plans. They are designed to be independent bodies. A common procedure is for the commission to receive applications for that position and forward three names to the governor, who has some number of days (often 60) to select one.

The powers, size, role, and makeup of judicial nominating commissions vary widely from state to state. Some commissions only make recommendations for appellate courts (the state supreme court and any intermediate appellate courts). Others make recommendations for trial court judge appointments as well.

Judicial nominating commissions are also used on the county level, such as in some Alabama counties.

== List of judicial nominating commissions ==
Current statewide judicial nominating commissions:

- Alaska – Alaska Judicial Council
- Arizona – Arizona Commission on Appellate Court Appointments
- Colorado – Colorado Supreme Court Nominating Commission
- Connecticut – Connecticut Judicial Selection Commission
- Delaware – Delaware Judicial Nominating Commission
- District of Columbia – District of Columbia Judicial Nomination Commission
- Florida – Florida Judicial Nominating Commission
- Georgia – Georgia Judicial Nominating Commission
- Hawaii – Hawaii Judicial Selection Commission
- Idaho – Idaho Judicial Council
- Indiana – Indiana Judicial Nominating Commission
- Iowa – Iowa Judicial Nominating Commission
- Kansas – Kansas Supreme Court Nominating Commission
- Kentucky – Kentucky Judicial Nominating Commission
- Maryland – Maryland Appellate Judicial Nominating Commission
- Massachusetts – Massachusetts Judicial Nominating Commission
- Minnesota – Minnesota Commission on Judicial Selection
- Missouri – Missouri Appellate Judicial Commission
- Montana – Montana Judicial Nominating Commission
- Nebraska – Nebraska Judicial Nominating Commission
- Oklahoma – Oklahoma Judicial Nominating Commission
- Rhode Island – Rhode Island Judicial Nominating Commission
- South Carolina – Judicial Merit Selection Commission
- South Dakota – South Dakota Judicial Qualifications Commission
- Tennessee – Tennessee Judicial Selection Commission
- Utah – Utah Judicial Nominating Commissions
- Vermont – Vermont Judicial Nominating Board
- Wyoming – Wyoming Judicial Nominating Commission

== Reception ==
Commissions are generally seen as a positive step to reduce partisanship and executive influence over the judiciary while increasing competence, though judges picked by a panel of their peers tends to produce the best outcomes.

== See also ==
- Redistricting commission
