= Jane Hamsher =

American film producer (born 1959)

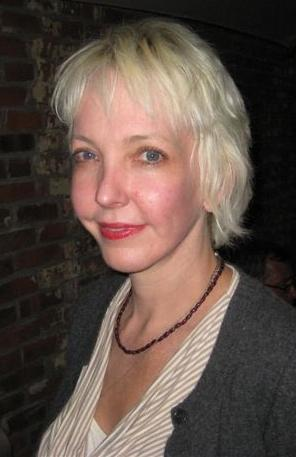
- Hamsher at the 2008 Democratic National Convention
- Born: Jane Murphy; July 25, 1959 (age 66); Fitchburg, Massachusetts, U.S.
- Education: The Peter Stark Producing Program at the USC School of Cinema-Television
- Occupations: Producer; author; blogger; publisher; political activist
- Website: firedoglake.com (2004-2015)

Jane Hamsher (born Jane Murphy; July 25, 1959) is a US film producer, author, and blogger best known as the author of Killer Instinct, a memoir about co-producing the 1994 movie Natural Born Killers with Don Murphy (no relation) and others, and as the founder and publisher of the politically progressive blog FireDogLake (2004 – 2015). With Murphy, she also co-produced the subsequent films Apt Pupil (1998), Permanent Midnight (1998), and From Hell (2001). A contributor to The Huffington Post, she posts also in websites and political magazines, such as AlterNet and The American Prospect.

== Personal history and education ==
Hamsher is a Massachusetts native who lived in Fitchburg and then Attleboro. Her family moved to Seattle when she was eight years old. She attended Roosevelt High School. She went on to attend Mills College in Oakland, California, and studied abroad in London. In college Hamsher worked as a reporter covering punk rock and politics for the San Francisco Bay Guardian. She also edited Damage, a punk rock fanzine. After college she moved to Los Angeles, where she was accepted into the Peter Stark Producing Program at the USC School of Cinema-Television. She received her M.F.A. in 1988.

Hamsher lived in the Los Angeles area for most of her career as a producer. She sold her Nichols Canyon house in 2004 and moved to Otter Rock, Oregon. When she became interested in the 2006 Connecticut Senate race, she rented a small farmhouse in Guilford, Connecticut, where she and other bloggers and reporters could live while covering the campaign. A few months later she raised money for a similar rental in Washington, D.C., called "Plame House", which served as a base for covering the Scooter Libby trial. She now has a residence in Washington, D.C.

Hamsher has had breast cancer three times: 1993, 2004, and 2006. She insisted on returning to Washington, D.C., two weeks after her third surgery to blog the remainder of the Scooter Libby trial. Her treatment has been at St. John's Health Center in Santa Monica, California.

Hamsher took her mother's maiden name. Her family name is Murphy. In 2009, Hamsher told Politico that she dated then-SEIU President Andy Stern for two years. She lives with her poodles Katie and Lucy. When Kobe, her third, died in 2009 she wrote a 5,000-word tribute.

== Professional career as film producer ==
At USC, Hamsher became friends with Don Murphy, forming a production company, Jane and Don Productions, Inc. For $10,000, they secured an option on the original screenplay for the 1994 satirical crime film Natural Born Killers, written by a then-unknown Quentin Tarantino. However, "the film, directed by Oliver Stone, departed significantly from Tarantino's original screenplay, so much so that Tarantino removed his name from the screenplay credits." The film starred Woody Harrelson, Juliette Lewis, Tom Sizemore, Rodney Dangerfield, Robert Downey, Jr., and Tommy Lee Jones. It was co-produced with Thom Mount and Arnon Milchan, and its credited screenwriters included Stone, Dave Veloz, and Richard Rutowski. In addition to co-producing the film, Hamsher also had an uncredited cameo in it as a female demon. In 1996, her JD Productions company signed a first look deal with Sony via Columbia Pictures.

Subsequently, Hamsher and Murphy also co-produced two 1998 films, including Brandon Boyce's screen adaptation Apt Pupil, from the Stephen King novella, directed by Bryan Singer and starring Ian McKellen, Brad Renfro, and David Schwimmer, and Permanent Midnight, adapted by Jerry Stahl and David Veloz from Stahl's autobiographical novel and starring Ben Stiller, Maria Bello, and Elizabeth Hurley; and the 2001 thriller From Hell, based on Terry Hayes and Rafael Yglesias' adaptation of the graphic novel From Hell, by Alan Moore and Eddie Campbell, directed by the Hughes Brothers, and starring Johnny Depp, Heather Graham, Ian Holm, Robbie Coltrane, Ian Richardson, and Jason Flemyng. Hamsher also produced or co-produced the 1990 dramatic feature film An American Summer and the 1994 live-action film adaptation Double Dragon, based on Double Dragon, a video game franchise.

== Killer Instinct ==
In September 1997, Hamsher published the controversial memoir Killer Instinct recounting her experiences as a producer of Natural Born Killers. The L.A. Times said the book is "chock-full of outrageous firsthand tales." As Entertainment Weekly put it, "Stone is painted as a hard-partying womanizer who pits his underlings against each other and plays mind games....Tarantino gets off less easily. Hamsher charges that he betrayed her and Murphy by going behind their backs to keep them from making Natural Born Killers. She also calls Tarantino a 'one-trick pony,' a wildly overrated director." Hamsher included a full-page reproduction of a suggestive note Tarantino allegedly sent her at the Venice Film Festival. On his website, Murphy says that when Tarantino's former manager, Cathryn Jaymes, "came back with her notes [on the manuscript] my then partner lost it on her, I guess because she didn't want to make changes. There are many reasons why our partnership ended soon after that book, but her treatment of Cathryn was a major factor." Killer Instinct reached number two on the L.A. Times bestseller list. Hamsher was later sued by an attorney who is described in the book as a "creepazoid attorney," "the Kmart Johnnie Cochran" and "a loser wannabe lawyer." The Appeals Court affirmed that colorful language which does not impugn professional abilities is protected by the First Amendment."

== Other organizations ==
Jane Hamsher is listed as leading the CommonSense Media Advertising Network, which includes Eschaton, FireDogLake, FiveThirtyEight, and Think Progress. The company filed for Chapter 7 Bankruptcy in the District of Columbia Bankruptcy Court on March 3, 2013

She has been involved with the political action groups Public Option Please, Blue America, Accountability Now and FDL Action.

== Related activities ==
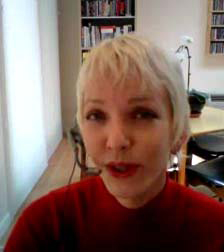
Jane Hamsher on Bloggingheads.tv.

Hamsher has been a guest on Fox News, CNN, MSNBC, PBS, the BBC, and Al Jazeera.

On April 7, 2008, she was a guest speaker in the panel discussion entitled "Intelligentsia" co-hosted by Elle and OfficeMax, along with Publisher of Elle Magazine Carol Smith, actress Melora Hardin, Vice President of Marketing for OfficeMax Julie Krueger, Editor in Chief of Elle Magazine Roberta Myers, footwear designer Taryn Rose, and Creative Director of Barneys Simon Doonan, at the Plaza Hotel, in New York City.

Among other blogger conference programs, she participated in the South by Southwest (SXSW) Interactive Panels, held in Austin, Texas, from March 9 to 13, 2007, in which she also moderated Dan Rather's "Keynote Interview" event on Monday, March 12, and in the panel on "Political Blogging: Macaca Mania" at the BlogWorld & New Media Expo 2008, in Las Vegas, Nevada, on September 20, 2008.

== Filmography ==
- An American Summer (1990)
- Double Dragon (1994)
- Natural Born Killers (1994)
- Apt Pupil (1998)
- Permanent Midnight (1998)
- From Hell (2001)

== Publications ==
- Hamsher, Jane. Killer Instinct: How Two Young Producers Took On Hollywood and Made the Most Controversial Film of the Decade. New York: Broadway Books, 1997. ISBN 0-7679-0074-X (10). ISBN 978-0-7679-0074-4 (13). ISBN 0-553-06914-4 (10). ISBN 978-0-553-06914-3 (13).
