= Outline of Colorado =

The flag of Colorado

The seal of Colorado

The location of the State of Colorado in the United States of America

The following outline is provided as an overview of and topical guide to the U.S. state of Colorado:

Colorado – 22nd most populous, the eighth most extensive, and the highest in average elevation of the 50 United States. Colorado is one of the western Mountain States. The 30 highest major summits of the Rocky Mountains all rise within Colorado. The Territory of Colorado joined the Union as the 38th state on August 1, 1876.

== General reference ==
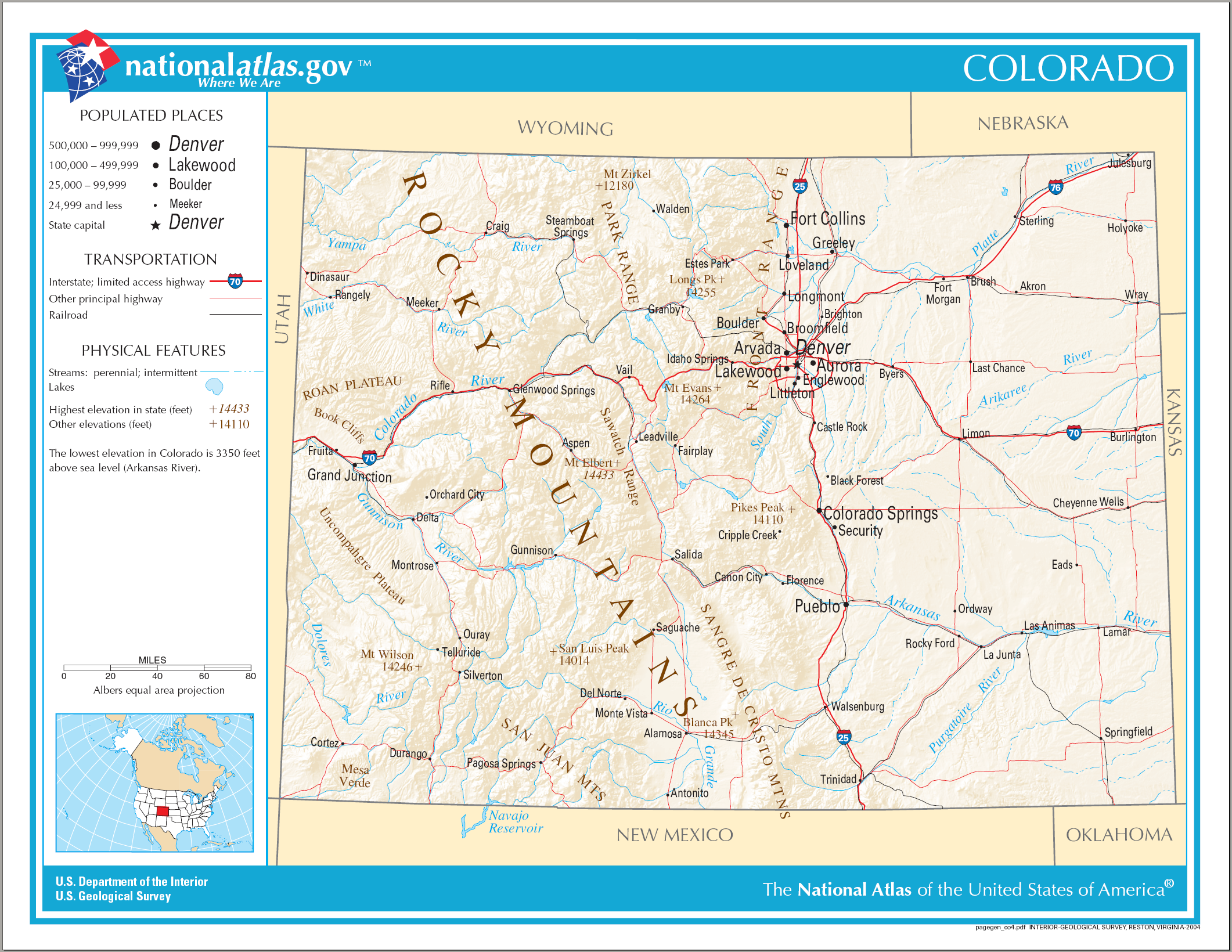
An enlargeable map of the state of Colorado

- Names
  - Common name: Colorado
    - Pronunciation: /kɒləˈrædoʊ/
  - Official name: State of Colorado
  - Abbreviations and name codes
    - Postal symbol: CO
    - ISO 3166-2 code: US-CO
    - Internet second-level domain: .co.us
  - Nicknames
    - Buffalo Plains State (in disuse)
    - Centennial State (previously used on license plates)
    - Colorful Colorado (previously used on license plates)
    - Columbine State
    - Highest State
    - Lead State (in disuse)
    - Mother of Rivers
    - Rocky Mountain Empire
    - Rocky Mountain State
    - Silver State (in disuse; see Nevada)
    - Switzerland of America
- Adjectival: Colorado
- Demonyms
  - Coloradan
  - Coloradoan (archaic)

== Geography of Colorado ==
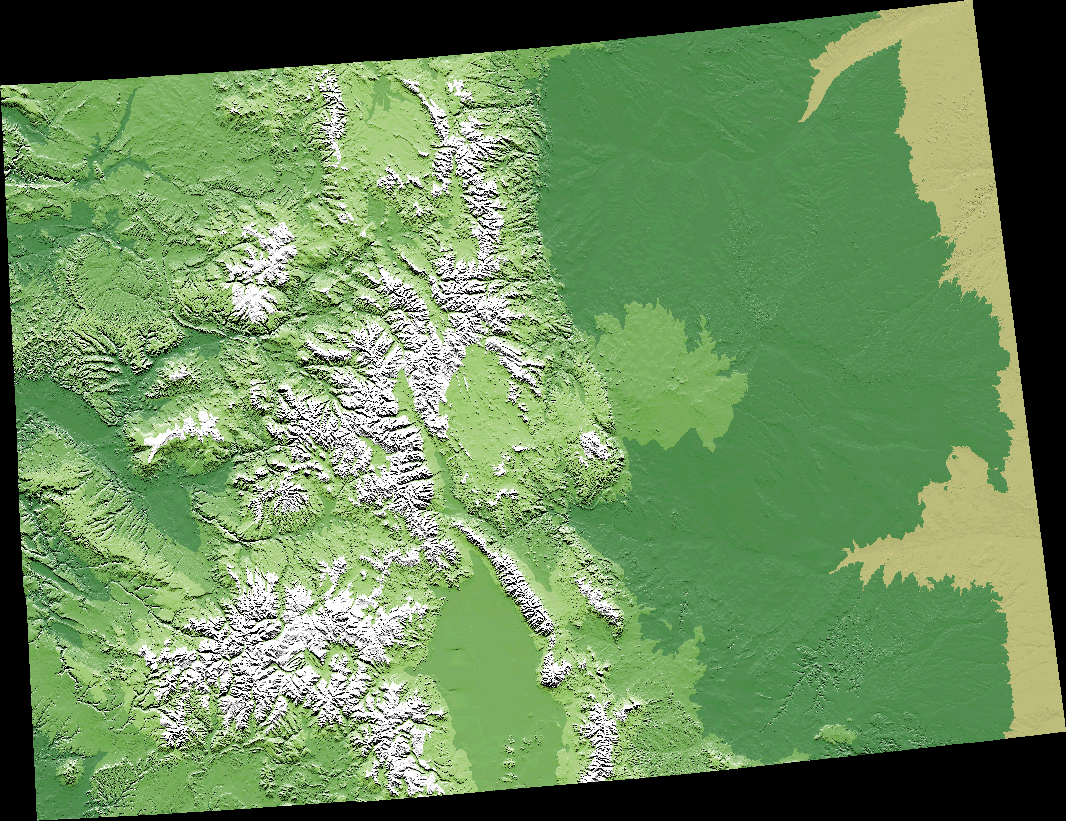
An enlargeable digital elevation map of the state of Colorado

Geography of Colorado

- Colorado is: a U.S. state, a federal state of the United States of America
- Location
  - Northern Hemisphere
  - Western Hemisphere
    - Americas
      - North America
        - Anglo America
        - Northern America
          - United States of America
            - Contiguous United States
              - Western United States
                - Mountain states
                - Southwestern United States
- Population of Colorado: 5,029,196 (2010 U.S. Census)
- Population density of Colorado: 18.39 km^{−2} (estimate for 2008)
- Area of Colorado: 268,657.7 km^{2}
- Atlas of Colorado

=== Places in Colorado ===
List of places in Colorado

- List of Colorado municipalities
- List of census-designated places in Colorado
- List of counties in Colorado
- Historic places in Colorado
  - Forts in Colorado
  - List of ghost towns in Colorado
  - National Historic Landmarks in Colorado
  - National Register of Historic Places listings in Colorado
    - Bridges on the National Register of Historic Places in Colorado
- National parks in Colorado
- State parks in Colorado
- National Natural Landmarks in Colorado

=== Environment of Colorado ===
- Climate of Colorado
- Protected areas in Colorado
  - State forests of Colorado
- Superfund sites in Colorado
- Wildlife of Colorado
  - Fauna of Colorado
    - Birds of Colorado
    - Mammals of Colorado
    - Reptiles
      - Snakes of Colorado

==== Natural geographic features of Colorado ====
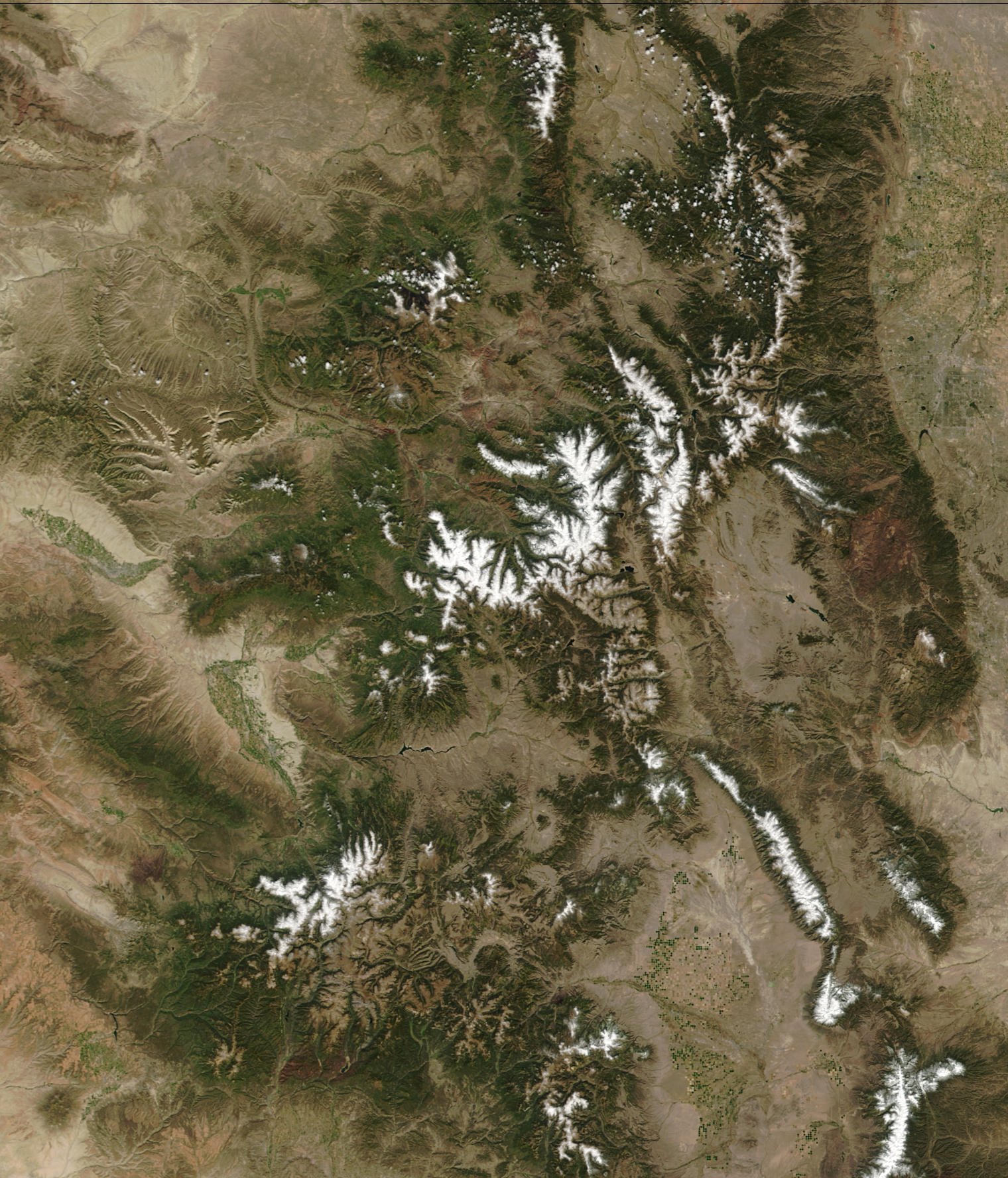
A satellite image of the Rocky Mountains in the state of Colorado.

- List of lakes in Colorado
- List of mountains of Colorado
  - Mountain ranges of Colorado
  - Mountain peaks of Colorado
    - The 100 highest major summits of Colorado
      - The 55 major 4000 meter summits of Colorado – major peaks over 13,123.4 feet elevation
      - The 51 Colorado fourteeners – peaks over 14,000 feet elevation
    - The 50 most prominent summits of Colorado
    - The 40 most isolated major summits of Colorado
  - Mountain passes of Colorado
- List of rivers of Colorado
  - Drainage basins of Colorado
- National Natural Landmarks in Colorado

==== Man-made geographic features of Colorado ====
- List of dams and reservoirs in Colorado

=== Regions of Colorado ===
- Central Colorado
  - South-Central Colorado
- Colorado Eastern Plains
- Colorado Mineral Belt
- Colorado Piedmont
- Colorado Plateau
- Colorado Western Slope
- Front Range Urban Corridor
  - Denver Region
  - North Front Range Region
  - Pikes Peak Region
- Grand Valley
- High Plains
- High Rockies
- Northern Colorado
- Roaring Fork Valley
- Rocky Mountains
  - Southern Rocky Mountains
    - Elk Mountains
      - Ruby Range
      - West Elk Mountains
    - Flat Tops
    - Front Range
      - Indian Peaks
      - Kenosha Mountains
      - Longs Peak Massif
      - Mummy Range
      - Never Summer Mountains
      - Pikes Peak Massif
      - Platte River Mountains
      - Rampart Range
      - South Park Hills
      - South Williams Fork Mountains
      - Tarryall Mountains
    - Gore Range
    - Grand Mesa
    - Laramie Mountains
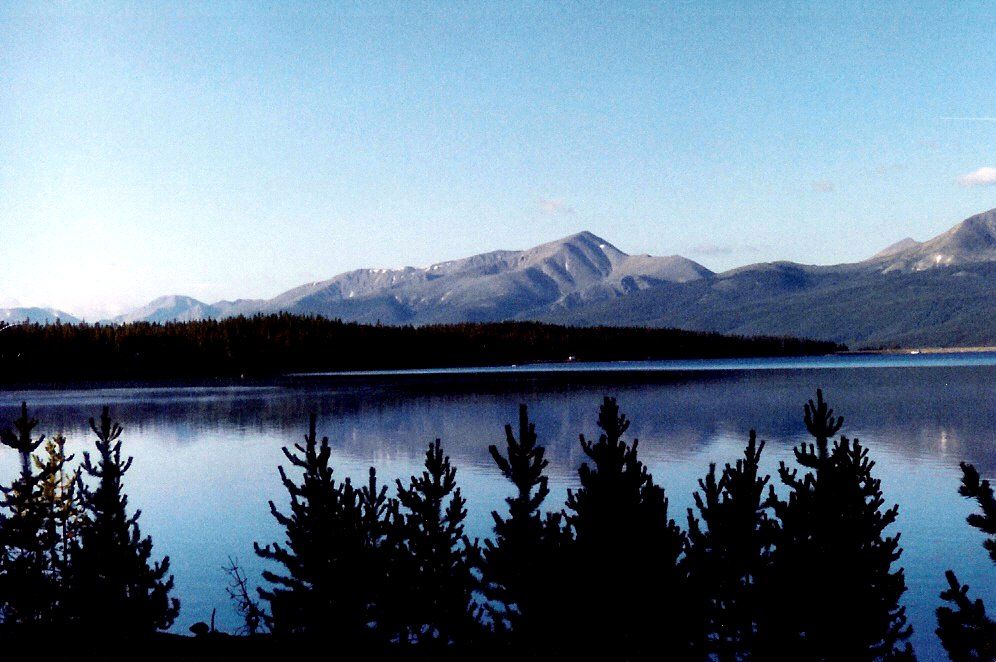
      Mount Elbert in the Sawatch Range of Colorado is the highest peak of the Rocky Mountains of North America
    - Massifs (large mountain masses)
      - Mount Elbert Massif – highest summit of the Rocky Mountains
      - Mount Massive Massif – second highest summit of the Rocky Mountains
      - Sierra Blanca Massif – fifth highest summit of the Rocky Mountains
      - Longs Peak Massif – 13th highest major summit of the Rocky Mountains
      - Pikes Peak Massif – 20th highest major summit of the Rocky Mountains
    - Medicine Bow Mountains
    - Mosquito Range
      - Tenmile Range
    - Park Range
      - Elkhead Mountains
    - Parks (large mountain basins)
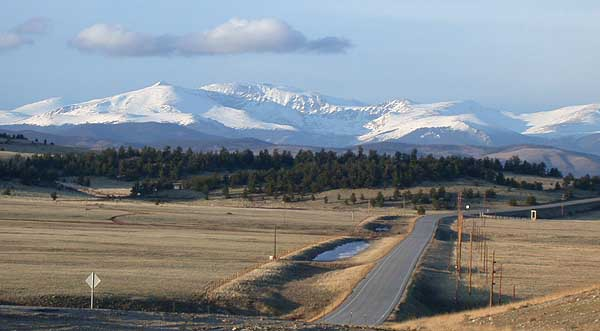
      South Park
      - Middle Park
      - North Park
      - San Luis Valley
      - South Park
    - Rabbit Ears Range
    - Raton Mesa
    - San Juan Mountains
      - La Garita Mountains
        - Cochetopa Hills
      - La Plata Mountains
      - Needle Mountains
        - Grenadier Range
        - West Needle Mountains
      - San Miguel Mountains
      - Sneffels Range
    - Sangre de Cristo Mountains
      - Culebra Range
      - Sangre de Cristo Range
        - Crestones
        - Sierra Blanca Massif
      - Spanish Peaks
      - Wet Mountains
    - Sawatch Range
      - Collegiate Peaks
      - Mount Elbert Massif
      - Mount Massive Massif
      - Williams Mountains
    - Uncompaghre Plateau
    - White River Plateau
  - Western Rocky Mountains
    - Uinta Mountains
  - Colorado Plateau
    - Ute Mountain
- Western Colorado
  - Northwestern Colorado
  - Southwestern Colorado

==== Administrative divisions of Colorado ====
An enlargeable map of the 64 counties of the state of Colorado

- The 64 counties of the state of Colorado
- There are no township governments in the state of Colorado.

=== Demography of Colorado ===
Demographics of Colorado

- Colorado census designated places
- Colorado census statistical areas
- Colorado counties
- Colorado metropolitan areas
- Colorado municipalities
- Front Range Urban Corridor

== Government and politics of Colorado ==
Politics of Colorado

=== Federal government in Colorado ===
- Colorado's congressional delegations
  - List of United States senators from Colorado
    - U.S. Senate Class II
      - John Hickenlooper
    - U.S. Senate Class III
      - Michael Bennet
  - List of United States representatives from Colorado
    - Congressional districts of Colorado
      - Colorado's 1st congressional district
        - Diana DeGette
      - Colorado's 2nd congressional district
        - Joe Neguse
      - Colorado's 3rd congressional district
        - Lauren Boebert
      - Colorado's 4th congressional district
        - Ken Buck
      - Colorado's 5th congressional district
        - Doug Lamborn
      - Colorado's 6th congressional district
        - Jason Crow
      - Colorado's 7th congressional district
        - Brittany Pettersen
      - Colorado's 8th congressional district
        - Yadira Caraveo

==== Military in Colorado ====
- Colorado Air National Guard
- Colorado Army National Guard
- Military facilities in Colorado

=== State government of Colorado ===
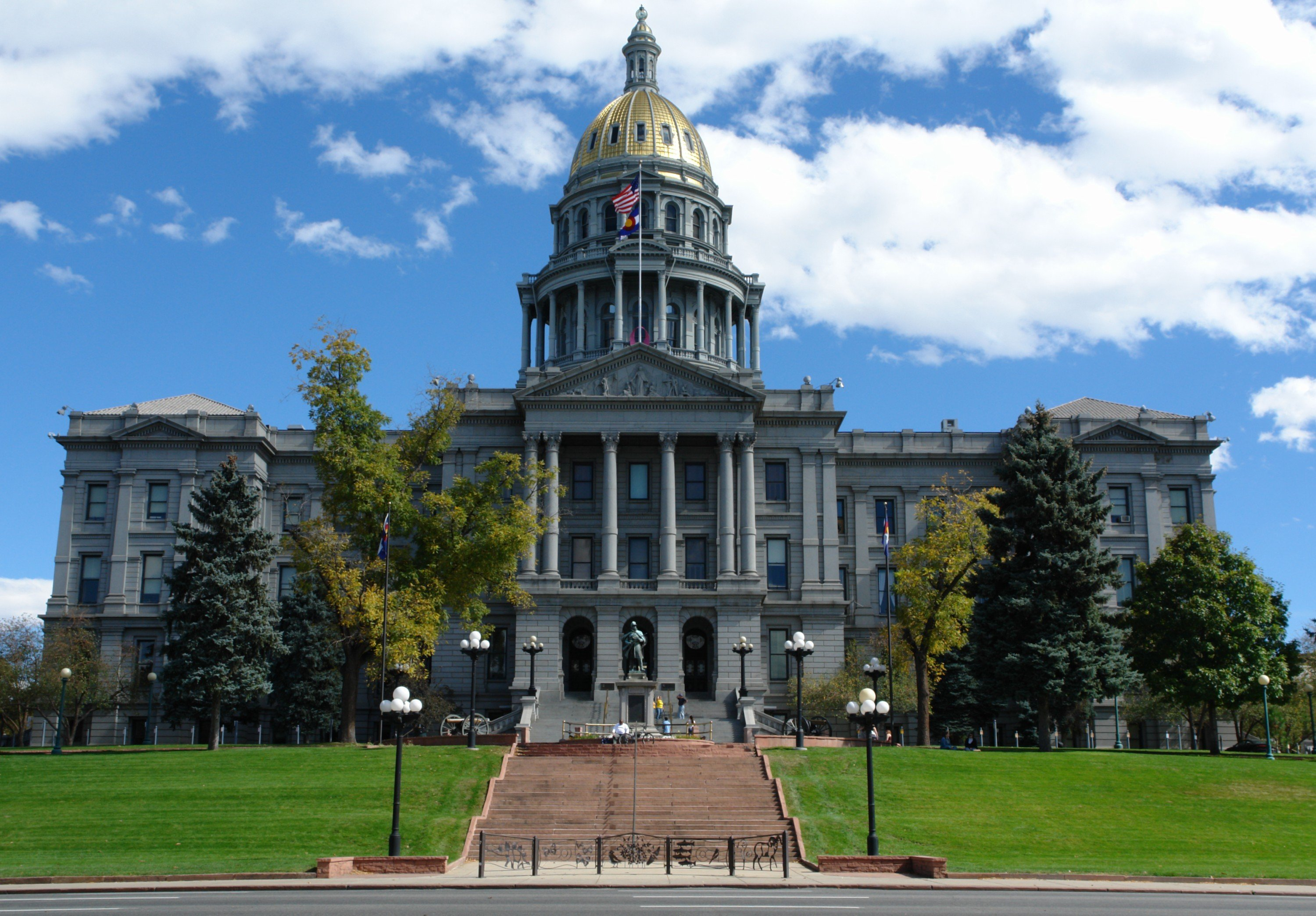
The Colorado State Capitol in Denver

Government of Colorado

- Form of government: U.S. state government
- Colorado State Capitol

==== Executive branch of the government of Colorado ====
- Governor of the State of Colorado website Jared Polis
  - Colorado Department of Agriculture (CDA) website
  - Colorado Department of Corrections (CDOC) website
  - Colorado Department of Education (CDE) website
  - Colorado Department of Health Care Policy and Financing (CDHCPF) website
  - Colorado Department of Higher Education (CDHE) website
  - Colorado Department of Human Services (CDHS) website
  - Colorado Department of Labor and Employment (CDLE) website
  - Colorado Department of Local Affairs (DOLA) website
  - Colorado Department of Military and Veterans Affairs (DMVA) website
    - Colorado Air National Guard website
    - Colorado Army National Guard website
  - Colorado Department of Natural Resources (CDNR) website
    - Colorado Division of Forestry website
    - Colorado State Parks website
  - Colorado Department of Personnel and Administration (DPA) website
  - Colorado Department of Public Health and Environment (CDPHE) website
  - Colorado Department of Public Safety (CDPS) website
  - Colorado Department of Regulatory Agencies (DORA) website
    - Colorado Public Utilities Commission (CPUC) website
  - Colorado Department of Revenue (DOR) website
  - Colorado Department of Transportation (CDOT) website
- Lieutenant Governor of the State of Colorado website Barbara O'Brien
- Secretary of the State of Colorado website Bernie Buescher
  - Colorado Department of State (DOS) website
- Attorney General of the State of Colorado website John W. Suthers
  - Colorado Department of Law (CDOL) website
- Treasurer of the State of Colorado website Cary Kennedy
  - Colorado Department of Treasury (CDT) website

==== Legislative branch of the government of Colorado ====
- Colorado General Assembly (bicameral)
  - Upper house: Colorado Senate
  - Lower house: Colorado House of Representatives

==== Judicial branch of the government of Colorado ====
Courts of Colorado

- Supreme Court of Colorado

=== Law and order in Colorado ===
Law of Colorado

- Cannabis in Colorado
- Capital punishment in Colorado
  - Individuals executed in Colorado
- Constitution of Colorado
- Crime in Colorado
- Gun laws in Colorado
- Law enforcement in Colorado
  - Law enforcement agencies in Colorado
    - Colorado State Patrol
- Same-sex marriage in Colorado

=== Local government in Colorado ===
- 64 counties.
- 272 municipalities.
- No township governments in Colorado.
- More than 4,000 special districts: see Active Colorado Local Governments

=== Elections and politics in Colorado ===
- Elections in Colorado
  - Electoral reform in Colorado
- Political party strength in Colorado

== History of Colorado ==
History of Colorado

=== History of Colorado, by period ===
Timeline of Colorado history

The location of the state of Colorado in the United States of America

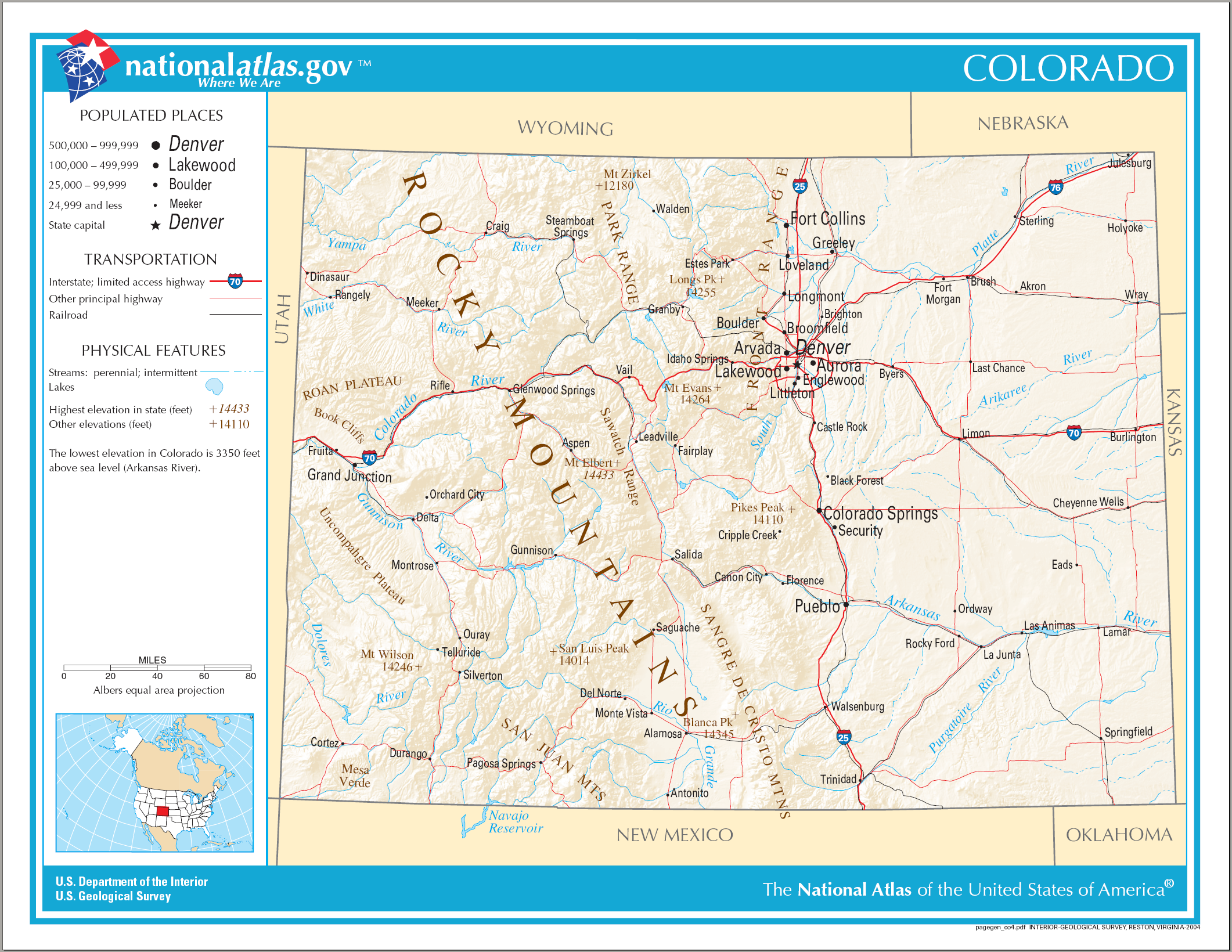
An enlargeable map of the state of Colorado

An enlargeable map of the 64 counties of the state of Colorado

- Prehistory of Colorado
  - Indigenous peoples
- Spanish colony of Santa Fé de Nuevo Méjico, 1598–1821
  - Domínguez–Escalante expedition, 1776
  - Spanish cavalry arrests U.S. Army Pike Expedition in San Luis Valley, 1807
  - Adams–Onís Treaty of 1819
  - Treaty of Córdoba of 1821
- French colony of Louisiane east of Continental Divide and San Luis Valley, 1699–1764
  - Treaty of Fontainebleau of 1762
- Spanish (though predominantly Francophone) district of Alta Luisiana east of Continental Divide and San Luis Valley, 1764–1803
  - Third Treaty of San Ildefonso of 1800
- French district of Haute-Louisiane east of Continental Divide and San Luis Valley, 1803
  - Louisiana Purchase of 1803
- Unorganized U.S. territory created by the Louisiana Purchase east of Continental Divide and San Luis Valley, 1803–1804
- District of Louisiana east of Continental Divide and San Luis Valley, 1804–1805
- Territory of Louisiana east of Continental Divide and San Luis Valley, 1805–1812
  - U.S. Army Pike Expedition, 1806–1807
- Territory of Missouri east of Continental Divide and San Luis Valley, 1812–1821
- Mexican territory of Santa Fé de Nuevo México south or west of Arkansas River, 1821–1846
- Unorganized U.S. territory north and east of Arkansas River, 1821–1854
  - Santa Fe Trail, 1821–1880
  - Bent's Old Fort, 1833–1849
  - Treaty of Fort Laramie of 1851
  - Territorial claims of the Republic of Texas between the Arkansas River and the Rio Grande and extending north between 106°10'42"W and 107°23'33"W, 1836–1845
- Mexican–American War, April 25, 1846 – February 2, 1848
  - Treaty of Guadalupe Hidalgo, February 2, 1848
- State of Deseret (extralegal), 1849–1850
- Territory of New Mexico (1850–1861)–1912
  - Hispanic settlers from Taos found village of San Luis in the San Luis Valley, April 9, 1851
- Territory of Utah (1850–1861)–1896
- Territory of Kansas, 1854–1861
- Territory of Nebraska (1854–1861)–1867
- Pike's Peak Gold Rush, 1858–1861
- Territory of Jefferson (extralegal), 1859–1861
  - Pony Express, 1860–1861
- Territory of Colorado, 1861–1876
  - American Civil War, April 12, 1861 – May 13, 1865
    - Colorado in the American Civil War
    - Battle of Glorieta Pass, March 26–28, 1862
  - Colorado War, 1863–1865
    - Sand Creek massacre, November 29, 1864
  - Union Pacific Railroad arrives at Julesburg on June 24, 1867
  - Comanche Campaign, 1868–1874
    - Battle of Beecher Island, 1868
  - Powell Geographic Expedition of 1869
  - Denver Pacific Railway arrives at Denver on June 24, 1870
  - Kansas Pacific Railway arrives at Denver on August 15, 1870
  - Denver and Rio Grande Railroad arrives at Pueblo on June 15, 1872
  - Hayden Survey of Colorado, 1873–1876
- State of Colorado becomes 38th state admitted to the United States of America on August 1, 1876
  - Colorado Silver Boom, 1879–1893
  - Alpine Tunnel on the Denver, South Park and Pacific Railroad opened to rail traffic on July 13, 1882
  - Denver and Rio Grande Railroad arrives at Silverton on July 15, 1882
  - Collapse of Colorado mining, 1893–1917
    - Panic of 1893
    - Sherman Silver Purchase Act repealed on November 1, 1893
    - Colorado (male) voters approve suffrage for women on November 7, 1893
  - Colorado Labor Wars, labor dispute, 1903–1904
  - Mesa Verde National Park established on June 29, 1906
  - Democratic National Convention in Denver nominates William Jennings Bryan for President of the United States, July 9, 1908
  - Ludlow Massacre, labor dispute, April 20, 1914
  - Rocky Mountain National Park established on January 26, 1915
  - Columbine Mine massacre, labor dispute, November 21, 1927
  - Moffat Tunnel on the Denver and Salt Lake Railroad opens to rail traffic on February 26, 1928
    - First ski lift in Colorado opens at Berthoud Pass on February 7, 1937
  - Lowry Field, 1938–1994
  - Winter Park Ski Area opens December 1939
  - World War II, September 1, 1939 – September 2, 1945
    - United States enters Second World War on December 8, 1941
    - Fort Carson, since January 31, 1942
    - Rocky Mountain Arsenal, June 30, 1942 – October 9, 1992
    - Pueblo Chemical Depot, since 1942
    - Granada War Relocation Center, August 1942 – October 15, 1945
    - Rocky Flats Plant, 1952–1992
  - Aspen Mountain Ski Area opens on December 14, 1946
  - United States Air Force Academy dedicated July 11, 1955
  - Bent's Old Fort National Historic Site designated on June 3, 1960
  - Colorado voters reject the XII Olympic Winter Games on November 7, 1972
  - Mesa Verde National Park designated a UNESCO World Heritage Site on September 8, 1978
  - Denver International Airport opens February 28, 1995
  - Group of Eight meets in Denver on June 20–22, 1997
  - Black Canyon of the Gunnison National Park designated on October 21, 1999
  - Great Sand Dunes National Park and Preserve designated on September 13, 2004
  - Sand Creek Massacre National Historic Site designated on April 27, 2007
  - Democratic National Convention in Denver nominates Barack Obama for President of the United States, August 27, 2008

=== History of Colorado, by region ===
==== State ====
- History of Colorado
  - A brief history of Colorado
  - History of Santa Fé de Nuevo Méjico, Nueva España, 1598–1821
  - History of La Louisiane, Nouvelle-France 1682–1764
  - History of Luisiana, Nueva España, 1764–1803
  - History of La Louisiane 1803–1803
  - History of the Louisiana Purchase, 1803–1804
  - History of the District of Louisiana, 1804–1805
  - History of the Territory of Louisiana, 1805–1812
  - History of the Territory of Missouri, 1812–1821
  - History of Santa Fe de Nuevo México, México, 1821–1850
  - History of the extralegal Territory of Deseret, 1849–1850
  - History of the Territory of New Mexico 1850–(1861)
  - History of the Territory of Utah 1850–(1861)
  - History of the Territory of Kansas 1854–1861
  - History of the Territory of Nebraska 1854–(1861)
  - History of the extralegal Territory of Jefferson 1859–1861
    - History of the governor of the Territory of Jefferson
  - History of the Territory of Colorado 1861–1876
    - History of the governors of the Territory of Colorado
  - History of the State of Colorado 1876–
    - History of the governors of the State of Colorado

==== Regions ====
- History of the Colorado Eastern Plains
- History of the Colorado Plateau
- History of the South Park

==== Counties ====
- History of the counties of Colorado
- History of Adams County, Colorado
- History of Alamosa County, Colorado
- History of Arapahoe County, Colorado
- History of Arapahoe County, Kansas Territory 1855–1861
- History of Archuleta County, Colorado
- History of Arrappahoe County, Jefferson Territory 1859–1861
- History of Baca County, Colorado
- History of Beaver County, Utah Territory 1856–(1861)
- History of Bent County, Colorado
- History of Boulder County, Colorado
- History of Broderick County, Kansas Territory 1859–1861
- History of Carbonate County, Colorado 1879–1879
- History of Chaffee County, Colorado
- History of Cheyenne County, Jefferson Territory 1859–1861
- History of Cheyenne County, Colorado
- History of Clear Creek County, Colorado
- History of Conejos County, Colorado
- History of Costilla County, Colorado
- History of Crowley County, Colorado
- History of Custer County, Colorado
- History of Delta County, Colorado
- History of Dolores County, Colorado
- History of Douglas County, Colorado
- History of Eagle County, Colorado
- History of El Paso County, Colorado
- History of El Paso County, Jefferson Territory 1859–1861
- History of El Paso County, Kansas Territory 1859–1861
- History of Elbert County, Colorado
- History of Fountain County, Jefferson Territory 1859–1861
- History of Fremont County, Kansas Territory 1859–1861
- History of Grand County, Colorado
- History of Greenwood County, Colorado Territory 1870–1874
- History of Green River County, Utah Territory 1852–1857 and 1859–(1861)
- History of Guadalupe County, Colorado Territory 1861–1861
- History of Heele County, Jefferson Territory 1859–1861
- History of Iron County, Utah Territory 1852–(1861)
- History of Jackson County, Colorado
- History of Jackson County, Jefferson Territory 1859–1861
- History of Jefferson County, Colorado
- History of Jefferson County, Jefferson Territory 1859–1861
- History of Kiowa County, Colorado
- History of Kit Carson County, Colorado
- History of Lake County, Colorado
- History of Larimer County, Colorado
- History of Larimer County, Colorado (book)
- History of Moffat County, Colorado
- History of Montana County, Kansas Territory 1859–1861
- History of Montezuma County, Colorado
- History of Mora County, New Mexico Territory 1860–(1861)
- History of Mountain County, Jefferson Territory 1859–1861
- History of North County, Jefferson Territory 1859–1861
- History of Oro County, Kansas Territory 1859–1861
- History of Ouray County, Colorado
- History of Park County, Jefferson Territory 1859–1861
- History of Peketon County, Kansas Territory 1859–1861
- History of Platte County, Colorado Territory 1872–1874
- History of Routt County, Colorado
- History of Saint Vrain County, Jefferson Territory 1859–1861
- History of Great Salt Lake County, Utah Territory 1852–(1861)
- History of San Juan County, Colorado
- History of San Miguel County, Colorado
- History of Sanpete County, Utah Territory 1852–(1861)
- History of Saratoga County, Jefferson Territory 1859–1861
- History of South Arapahoe County, Colorado 1902–1903
- History of Summit County, Colorado
- History of Taos County, New Mexico Territory 1852–(1861)
- History of Teller County, Colorado
- History of Uncompaghre County, Colorado 1883–1883
- History of Utah County, Utah Territory 1852–(1861)
- History of Washington County, Utah Territory 1852–(1861)
- History of Weld County, Colorado

==== Places ====
- History of Acres Green, Colorado
- History of Adams City, Colorado
- History of Agate, Colorado
- History of Almont, Colorado
- History of Amherst, Colorado
- History of Animas Forks, Colorado
- History of Anton, Colorado
- History of Arapahoe, Colorado
- History of Arapahoe, Colorado (ghost town)
- History of Arlington, Colorado
- History of Arvada, Colorado
- History of Ashcroft, Colorado
- History of Aspen, Colorado
- History of Ault, Colorado
- History of Aurora, Colorado; (Timeline)
- History of Avon, Colorado
- History of Badito, Colorado
- History of Bailey, Colorado
- History of Beaver Creek, Colorado
- History of Bedrock, Colorado
- History of Bellvue, Colorado
- History of Bent's Old Fort, Colorado
- History of Berthoud, Colorado
- History of Beulah, Colorado
- History of Black Hawk, Colorado
- History of Boncarbo, Colorado
- History of Boulder, Colorado; (Timeline)
- History of Bovina, Colorado
- History of Bow Mar, Colorado
- History of Brandon, Colorado
- History of Breckenridge, Colorado
- History of Briggsdale, Colorado
- History of Bristol, Colorado
- History of Broomfield, Colorado
- History of Brush, Colorado
- History of Buckskin Joe, Colorado
- History of Buffalo Creek, Colorado
- History of Burlington, Colorado
- History of Burns, Colorado
- History of Cahone, Colorado
- History of Camp Carson, Colorado
- History of Camp Collins, Colorado
- History of Cañon City, Colorado
- History of Capulin, Colorado
- History of Carbondale, Colorado
- History of Caribou, Colorado
- History of Carr, Colorado
- History of Cascade, Colorado
- History of Castle Pines North, Colorado
- History of Castle Pines Village, Colorado
- History of Castle Rock, Colorado
- History of Cedaredge, Colorado
- History of Centennial, Colorado
- History of Central City, Colorado
- History of Chama, Colorado
- History of the Cherry Creek Diggings, Kansas Territory
- History of Chivington, Colorado
- History of Climax, Colorado
- History of Colfax, Colorado
- History of Colorado City, Colorado
- History of Colorado Springs, Colorado; (Timeline)
- History of Commerce City, Colorado
- History of Commerce Town, Colorado
- History of Conifer, Colorado
- History of Craig, Colorado
- History of Creede, Colorado
- History of Crested Butte, Colorado
- History of Crestone, Colorado
- History of Cripple Creek, Colorado
- History of Crystal, Colorado
- History of Dakan, Colorado
- History of De Beque, Colorado
- History of Deer Trail, Colorado
- History of Denver, Colorado; *(Timeline)
  - A brief history of Denver
  - History of the Alamo Placita neighborhood in Denver
  - History of the Athmar Park neighborhood in Denver
  - History of the Auraria neighborhood in Denver
  - History of the Baker neighborhood in Denver
  - History of the Barnum neighborhood in Denver
  - History of the Belcaro neighborhood in Denver
  - History of the City Park in Denver
  - History of the Civic Center in Denver
  - History of the Elyria-Swansea neighborhood in Denver
  - History of the Five Points neighborhood in Denver
  - History of the Globeville neighborhood in Denver
  - History of the Golden Triangle neighborhood in Denver
  - History of the Highland neighborhood in Denver
  - History of the Jefferson Park neighborhood in Denver
  - History of the LoDo neighborhood in Denver
  - History of the Park Hill neighborhood in Denver
  - History of the Villa Park neighborhood in Denver
  - History of the Washington Park neighborhood in Denver
  - History of the West Colfax neighborhood in Denver
- History of Defiance, Colorado
- History of Divide, Colorado
- History of Durango, Colorado
- History of Dyersville, Colorado
- History of Elizabeth, Colorado
- History of Englewood, Colorado
- History of Eureka, Colorado
- History of Evergreen, Colorado
- History of Falcon, Colorado
- History of Fletcher, Colorado
- History of Fort Carson, Colorado
- History of Fort Collins, Colorado
- History of Fort Garland, Colorado
- History of Fort Lyon, Colorado
- History of Fort Saint Vrain, Colorado
- History of Fort Vasquez, Colorado
- History of Fort Wise, Colorado
- History of Fountain, Colorado
- History of Franktown, Colorado
- History of Fruita, Colorado
- History of Garden City, Colorado
- History of Garibaldi, Colorado
- History of Georgetown, Colorado
- History of Gilman, Colorado
- History of Glenwood Springs, Colorado
- History of Gold Hill, Colorado
- History of Golden, Colorado
- History of Gould, Colorado
- History of Greeley, Colorado
- History of Gunnison, Colorado
- History of Hartman, Colorado
- History of Hayden, Colorado
- History of Henderson Island, Colorado
- History of Highlands Ranch, Colorado
- History of Holly, Colorado
- History of Homelake, Colorado
- History of Hot Sulphur Springs, Colorado
- History of Idaho Springs, Colorado
- History of Idledale, Colorado
- History of Johnstown, Colorado
- History of Keota, Colorado
- History of Kersey, Colorado
- History of Kittredge, Colorado
- History of Kremmling, Colorado
- History of La Veta, Colorado
- History of Lafayette, Colorado
- History of Lake George, Colorado
- History of Laporte, Colorado
- History of Leadville, Colorado
- History of the Little Dry Creek Diggings, Kansas Territory
- History of Longmont, Colorado
- History of Loveland, Colorado
- History of Lyons, Colorado
- History of Manassa, Colorado
- History of Mancos, Colorado
- History of Manhattan, Colorado
- History of Marble, Colorado
- History of Mead, Colorado
- History of Meeker, Colorado
- History of Minturn, Colorado
- History of Moffat, Colorado
- History of Montezuma, Colorado
- History of Montrose, Colorado
- History of Morrison, Colorado
- History of Mountain View, Colorado
- History of Nathrop, Colorado
- History of Nevadaville, Colorado
- History of Orchard City, Colorado
- History of Oro City, Colorado
- History of Ouray, Colorado
- History of Palmer Lake, Colorado
- History of Paonia, Colorado
- History of Pingree Park, Colorado
- History of Placerville, Colorado
- History of Platteville, Colorado
- History of Pueblo, Colorado
- History of Raymer, Colorado
- History of Redstone, Colorado
- History of Reunion, Colorado
- History of Ridgway, Colorado
- History of Rosita, Colorado
- History of Russell Gulch, Colorado
- History of Saint Elmo, Colorado
- History of Serene, Colorado
- History of Silver Cliff, Colorado
- History of Silverthorne, Colorado
- History of Snowmass Village, Colorado
- History of Steamboat Springs, Colorado
- History of Sterling, Colorado
- History of Superior, Colorado
- History of Telluride, Colorado
- History of Thornton, Colorado
- History of Timnath, Colorado
- History of Tincup, Colorado
- History of Vail, Colorado
- History of Victor, Colorado
- History of Villa Grove, Colorado
- History of Walsenburg, Colorado
- History of Ward, Colorado
- History of Waverly, Colorado
- History of Wellington, Colorado
- History of Westminster, Colorado
- History of Wheat Ridge, Colorado
- History of Winter Park, Colorado

=== History of Colorado, by subject ===
- History of architecture in Colorado:
  - History of the Bears Stadium in Denver
  - History of the Beaumont Hotel in Ouray
  - History of the Broadmoor World Arena in Colorado Springs
  - History of the Cathedral Basilica of the Immaculate Conception in Denver
  - History of the Cathedral of the Sacred Heart in Pueblo
  - History of the Chautauqua Auditorium in Boulder
  - History of the Citadel Mall in Colorado Springs
  - History of the Colorado Convention Center in Denver
  - History of the Colorado Governor's Mansion in Denver
  - History of the Colorado Springs Airport
  - History of the Denver Art Museum
  - History of the Denver City Cable Railway Building
  - History of the Denver Federal Center
  - History of the Denver International Airport
  - History of the Denver Millennium Bridge
  - History of the Denver Municipal Airport
  - History of the Fox Theatre in Boulder
  - History of the Georgetown Loop
  - History of the Hotel Colorado in Glenwood Springs
  - History of the Invesco Field at Mile High in Denver
  - History of the McNichols Sports Arena in Denver
  - History of the Midway House in Aspen Park
  - History of the Mile High Stadium in Denver
  - History of the Mousetrap in Denver
  - History of the Paramount Theatre in Denver
  - History of the Pepsi Center in Denver
  - History of the Regency in Denver
  - History of the Stapleton International Airport in Denver
  - History of the Twenty Ninth Street Development in Boulder
  - History of the Union Station in Denver
- History of commerce in Colorado:
  - History of Colorado Railcar
  - History of the Colorado Central Railroad
  - History of the Colorado Midland Railway
  - History of the Colorado Springs and Cripple Creek District Railway
  - History of the Denver and Rio Grande Western Railroad
  - History of the Denver and Salt Lake Railway
  - History of the Denver Pacific Railway and Telegraph Company
  - History of the Denver, South Park and Pacific Railroad
  - History of the Gulf, Colorado and Santa Fe Railway
- History of the counties of Colorado
- History of education in Colorado:
  - History of schools in Colorado:
    - History of the Arapahoe High School
    - History of the Bear Creek High School
    - History of the Brighton High School
    - History of the Central High School in Pueblo, Colorado
    - History of the Clear Creek High School
    - History of the Colorado Academy
    - History of the Colorado Rocky Mountain School
    - History of the Colorado Springs School
    - History of the Colorado's Finest Alternative High School
    - History of the Coronado High School
    - History of the Denver Academy
    - History of the Denver Montclair International School
    - History of the Denver School of the Arts
    - History of the Douglas County High School
    - History of the East High School in Denver
    - History of the Englewood High School
    - History of the Evergreen High School
    - History of the Fossil Ridge High School
    - History of the George Washington High School in Denver
    - History of the Grandview High School
    - History of the Heritage Christian Academy
    - History of the Highland High School
    - History of the Holy Family High School
    - History of the Horizon High School
    - History of the Littleton High School
    - History of the Monarch High School
    - History of the Pomona High School
    - History of the Saint Mary's High School
    - History of the Skyline High School
    - History of the South High School in Denver
    - History of the Thornton High School
  - History of the school districts of Colorado:
    - History of the Aurora Public Schools
    - History of the Colorado Springs School District 11
    - History of the Denver Public Schools
    - History of the Jefferson County Public Schools
  - History of higher education in Colorado:
    - History of the Adams State University 1921–
    - History of the Agricultural College of Colorado 1879–1935
    - History of the Colorado Agricultural and Mechanical College 1944–1957
    - History of the Colorado Christian College 1985–1989
    - History of the Colorado Christian University 1914–
    - History of the Colorado College 1874–
    - History of the Colorado College of Agricultural and Mechanic Arts 1935–1944
    - History of the Colorado Community College System 1967–
    - History of the Colorado Heights University 1989–
    - History of the Colorado State College 1957–1970
    - History of the Colorado State College of Education 1935–1957
    - History of the Colorado State Normal School 1890–1911
    - History of the Colorado State Normal School for Children 1901–1923
    - History of the Colorado State Teachers College 1911–1935
    - History of the Colorado State University 1879–
    - History of the Colorado State University-Pueblo 1993–
    - History of the Colorado Technical University 1965–
    - History of the Colorado Women's College 1909–1867 and 1973–1982
    - History of the Denver Bible College 1945–1949
    - History of the Denver Bible Institute 1914–1945
    - History of the Fort Lewis College 1933–
    - History of the Loretto Heights College 1891–1988
    - History of the Metropolitan State College of Denver 1965–
    - History of the Teikyo Loretto Heights University 1989–2009
    - History of the Temple Buell College 1967–1973
    - History of the Rockmont College 1949–1985
    - History of the Pueblo Junior College 1937–1961
    - History of the Southern Colorado Junior College 1993–1937
    - History of the Southern Colorado State College 1961–1975
    - History of the United States Air Force Academy 1955–
    - History of the University of Colorado at Boulder 1876–
      - History of the University of Colorado Engineering Management Program 1987–
      - History of the University of Colorado School of Law 1892–
    - History of the University of Colorado at Colorado Springs 1965–
    - History of the University of Colorado Denver 1912–
      - History of the University of Colorado Denver School of Dental Medicine 1922–
      - History of the University of Colorado Health Sciences Center 1979–2004
    - History of the University of Northern Colorado 1890–
    - History of the University of Southern Colorado 1975–2003
    - History of the Western Colorado Community College 2006–
    - History of the Western Colorado University 1901–
    - History of the Western State College of Colorado 1923–2012
- History of federal facilities in Colorado
  - History of the Bent's Old Fort National Historic Site
  - History of the Black Canyon of the Gunnison National Park
  - History of the Browns Park National Wildlife Refuge
  - History of the Canyons of the Ancients National Monument
  - History of the Cathedral of Saint John in the Wilderness in Denver
  - History of the Collegiate Peaks Wilderness
  - History of the Colorado National Monument
  - History of the United States Mint at Denver
  - History of the Dinosaur National Monument
  - History of the Gold Belt National Scenic and Historic Byway
  - History of the Great Sand Dunes National Park and Preserve
  - History of the Hovenweep National Monument
  - History of the Indian Peaks Wilderness
  - History of the James Peak Wilderness
  - History of the McInnis Canyons National Conservation Area
  - History of the Mesa Verde National Park and World Heritage Site
  - History of the Monte Vista National Wildlife Refuge
  - History of the Rocky Flats National Wildlife Refuge
  - History of the Rocky Mountain Arsenal National Wildlife Refuge
  - History of the Rocky Mountain National Park
  - History of the Sand Creek Massacre National Historic Site
  - History of the Spanish Peaks Wilderness
  - History of the Two Ponds National Wildlife Refuge
  - History of the Yucca House National Monument
- History of marriage in Colorado
- History of the military in Colorado:
  - History of the Air Force Space Command (AFSPC) 1982–
  - History of Camp Carson 1942–1954
  - History of Camp Collins 1858–1864
  - History of Camp Hale 1942–1964
  - History of Camp George West 1903–
  - History of Cheyenne Mountain Air Force Station 1966–2006
  - History of the Colorado Air National Guard 1923–
  - History of the Colorado Army National Guard 1860–
    - History of the 1st Regiment of Colorado Volunteers 1861–1862
  - History of Ent Air Force Base 1951–1976
  - History of Falcon Air Force Base 1985–1998
  - History of Fitzsimons Army Medical Center 1918–1999
  - History of Fort Carson 1942–
  - History of Fort Collins 1864–1872
  - History of Fort Garland 1858–1883
  - History of Fort Lyon 1862–1897
  - History of Fort Wise 1860–1862
  - History of Lowry Air Force Base 1938–1994
  - History of the North American Aerospace Defense Command (NORAD) 1958–
  - History of Peterson Air Force Base 1942–
  - History of the Pueblo Chemical Depot 1942–
    - History of the Pueblo Chemical Agent-Destruction Pilot Plant
  - History of the Rocky Mountain Arsenal 1942–1992
  - History of Schriever Air Force Base 1985–
  - History of the United States Air Force Academy 1955–
  - History of the United States Northern Command (NORTHCOM) 2002–
- History of the municipalities of Colorado
- History of newspapers in Colorado:
  - History of the Boulder Daily Camera
  - History of the Camera of Boulder, Colorado
  - History of the Colorado Springs Gazette-Telegraph
  - History of the Colorado Springs Independent
  - History of the Daily Camera of Boulder, Colorado
  - History of The Denver Post
  - History of The Gazette of Colorado Springs, Colorado
  - History of the Rocky Mountain News
- History of religion in Colorado
  - History of the Calvary Episcopal Church in Golden, Colorado
  - History of the Cathedral Basilica of the Immaculate Conception in Denver
  - History of the Cathedral of the Sacred Heart in Pueblo, Colorado
  - History of the Church of Jesus Christ of Latter-day Saints in Colorado
  - History of the Colorado Community Church
  - History of the Grace Episcopal Church in Georgetown, Colorado
  - History of the New Life Church in Colorado Springs, Colorado
  - History of the Roman Catholic Archdiocese of Denver
  - History of the Saint Mark Coptic Orthodox Church in Centennial, Colorado
- History of sports in Colorado
  - History of the Colorado Avalanche hockey club
  - History of the Colorado Crush arena football club
  - History of the Colorado Rapids soccer football club
    - History of the Colorado Rapids U23's
  - History of the Colorado Rockies baseball club
  - History of the Colorado Silver Bullets baseball club
  - History of the Denver Barbarians rugby football club
  - History of the Denver Dynamite arena football club
  - History of the Denver Gold football club
  - History of the Real Colorado Foxes soccer football club
  - History of the University of Colorado sports teams
    - History of the University of Colorado football team
- History of the state parks of Colorado
  - History of the Bonny Lake State Park, Colorado
  - History of the Pearl Lake State Park, Colorado
  - History of the Lake Pueblo State Park, Colorado
  - History of the Eldorado Canyon State Park, Colorado
- History of transportation in Colorado:
  - History of roads in Colorado:
    - History of the Colorado State Highway 67
    - History of the Colorado State Highway 470
    - History of the Colorado State Patrol 1935–
    - History of the Colorado T-REX Project (TRansportation EXpansion) 2001–2006
    - History of the Dinosaur Diamond Scenic and Historic Byway
    - History of the Interstate Highway 25 in Colorado
    - History of the Interstate Highway 70 in Colorado
    - History of the Lariat Loop Scenic and Historic Byway
    - History of the Mousetrap in Denver
    - History of the Old Spanish Trail
    - History of the Pony Express 1860–1861
    - History of the Santa Fe Trail
    - History of the Trail Ridge Road
    - History of the TransAmerica Trail Bicycle Route 1976–
  - History of railroads in Colorado:
    - History of the California Limited passenger train 1892–1954
    - History of the California Zephyr passenger train 1949–1970 and 1983–
    - History of the Chief passenger train 1926–1968
    - History of the City of Denver passenger train 1936–1971
    - History of the Colorado and Southern Railway 1898–1981
    - History of the Colorado Central Railroad 1868–1890
    - History of the Colorado Midland Railway 1883–1918
    - History of the Colorado Springs and Cripple Creek District Railway 1899–1920
    - History of the Denver and Rio Grande Western Railroad 1870–1988
    - History of the Denver and Salt Lake Railway 1902–1947
    - History of the Denver International Airport Automated Guideway Transit System 1995–
    - History of the Denver Pacific Railway and Telegraph Company 1867–1880
    - History of the Denver, South Park and Pacific Railroad 1872–1889
    - History of the Denver Union Station 1881–
    - History of the Denver Zephyr passenger train 1934–1972
    - History of the Florence and Cripple Creek Railroad 1893–1920
    - History of the Georgetown Loop 1884–1938 and 1984–
    - History of the Gilpin Railroad 1887–1917
    - History of the Gulf, Colorado and Santa Fe Railway 1873–1965
    - History of the narrow gauge railroads in Colorado 1871–
    - History of the Rio Grande Ski Train passenger train 1940–2009
    - History of the Rio Grande Southern Railroad 1890–1951
    - History of the Rio Grande Zephyr passenger train 1971–1983
    - History of the Southwest Chief passenger train 1984–
    - History of the Southwest Limited passenger train 1974–1984
    - History of the Super Chief passenger train 1936–1971
    - History of the Texas Zephyr passenger train 1940–1967
    - History of the Uintah Railway 1902–1939
  - History of aviation in Colorado:
    - History of aircraft and aviators in Colorado:
      - CAF Rocky Mountain Wing Museum, Grand Junction, Colorado
      - Colorado Aviation Hall of Fame, Denver
      - Colorado Aviation Historical Society, Denver
      - Peterson Air and Space Museum, Colorado Springs, Colorado
      - Pueblo Historical Aircraft Society, Pueblo, Colorado
      - Pueblo Weisbrod Aircraft Museum (combined Weisbrod and B-24 International Museums)
      - Spirit of Flight Center, Lafayette, Colorado
      - Vintage Aero Flying Museum, Hudson, Colorado
      - Wings Over the Rockies Air and Space Museum, Denver
    - History of airports in Colorado:
      - History of the Colorado Springs Airport 1927–
      - History of the Denver International Airport 1995–
      - History of the Denver Municipal Airport, 1929–1944
      - History of the Stapleton International Airport 1944–1995
      - List of airports in Colorado
- History of the United States congressional districts of Colorado
  - History of the Colorado 1st congressional district
  - History of the Colorado 2nd congressional district
  - History of the Colorado 3rd congressional district
  - History of the Colorado 4th congressional district
  - History of the Colorado 5th congressional district
  - History of the Colorado 6th congressional district
  - History of the Colorado 7th congressional district
  - History of the Colorado At-large congressional district
- History of United States Navy ships named for Colorado:
  - History of USS Colorado 1858–1876
  - History of USS Denver (C-14/PG-28/CL-16) 1904–1931
  - History of USS Colorado (ACR-7) 1905–1916
  - History of USS Pueblo (CA-7) 1916–1927
  - History of USS Colorado (BB-45) 1923–1947
  - History of USS Denver (CL-58) 1942–1947
  - History of USS Pueblo (PF-13) 1944–1946
  - History of USS Boulder Victory (AK-227) 1944–1946
  - History of USS Montrose (APA-212) 1944–1969
  - History of USS Pitkin County (LST-1082) 1945–1971
  - History of USS Pueblo (AGER-2) 1967–captured by North Korea 1968
  - History of USS Denver (LPD-9) 1968–
  - History of USS Boulder (LST-1190) 1971–1994
- History of waterways in Colorado
  - History of the Cherry Creek in Colorado
  - History of the Clear Creek in Colorado
  - History of the Colorado River
  - History of the Ralston Creek in Colorado
- List of territorial claims and designations in Colorado
- Uranium mining in Colorado

== Culture of Colorado ==
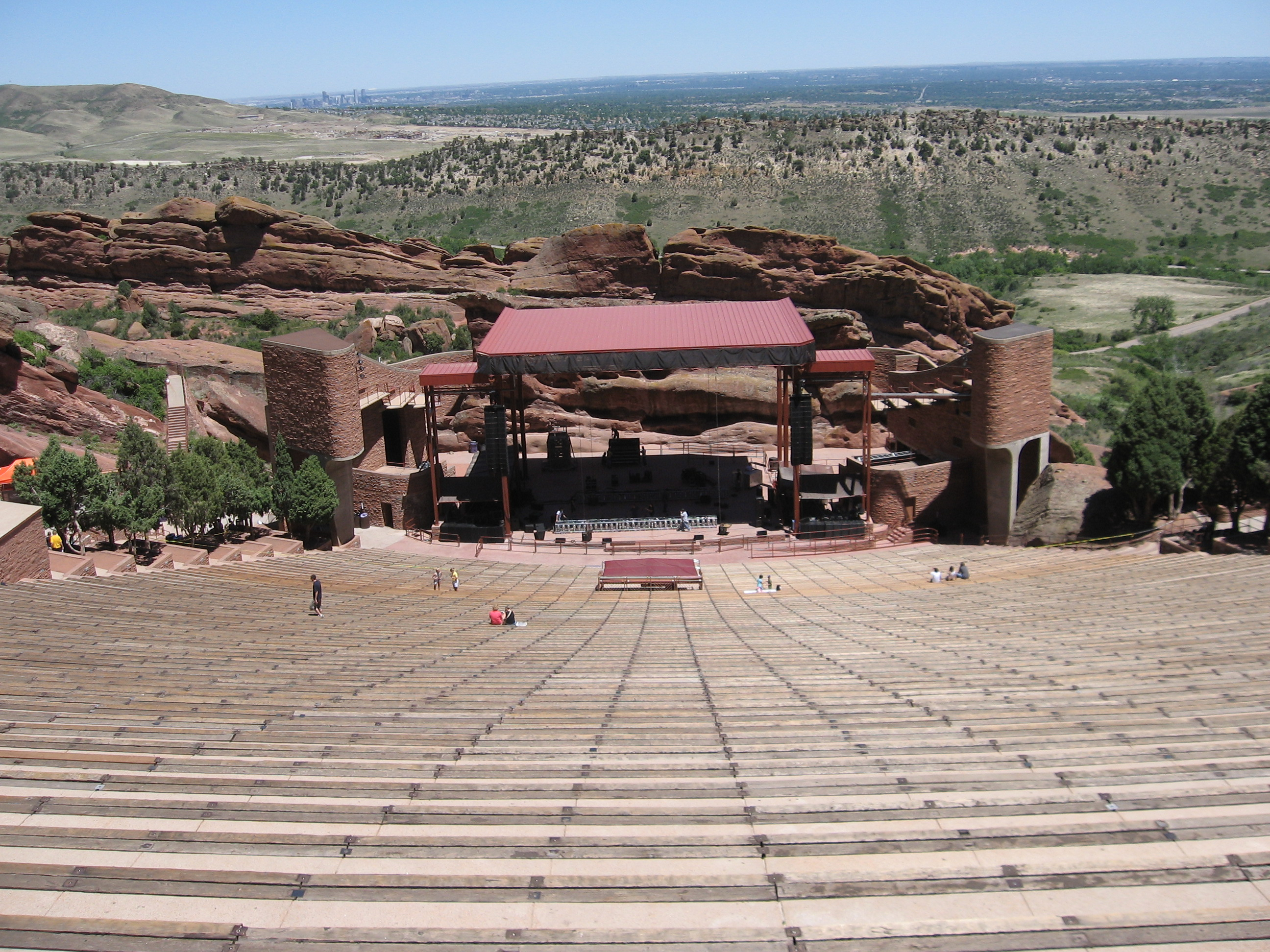
Red Rocks Amphitheatre

Culture of Colorado

- Museums in Colorado
- Religion in Colorado
  - Episcopal Diocese of Colorado
    - Cathedral of St. John in the Wilderness, Denver
  - Focus on the Family
  - Rocky Mountain District (LCMS)
  - Roman Catholic Archdiocese of Denver
    - Cathedral Basilica of the Immaculate Conception
  - Roman Catholic Diocese of Colorado Springs
  - Roman Catholic Diocese of Pueblo
    - Cathedral of the Sacred Heart in Pueblo
  - The Church of Jesus Christ of Latter-day Saints in Colorado
    - Denver Colorado Temple
- Scouting in Colorado
- State symbols of Colorado
  - Flag of the State of Colorado
  - Great Seal of the State of Colorado
  - Colorado state bird
  - Colorado state fish
  - Colorado state folk dance
  - Colorado state fossil
  - Colorado state gemstone
  - Colorado state grass
  - Colorado state insect
  - Colorado state mammal
  - Colorado state mineral
  - Colorado state motto
  - Colorado state nickname
  - Colorado state reptile
  - Colorado state slogan
  - Colorado state soil
  - first Colorado state song
  - second Colorado state song
  - Colorado state stone
  - Colorado state tartan
  - Colorado state tree

=== The arts in Colorado ===
- Music of Colorado
- Theater in Colorado

=== Sports in Colorado ===
Sports in Colorado

- Professional sports teams in Colorado

== Economy and infrastructure of Colorado ==
Economy of Colorado

- Communications in Colorado
  - Newspapers in Colorado
  - Radio stations in Colorado
  - Telephone service in Colorado
    - Telephone Area Codes: 303, 719, 720, 970
  - Television stations in Colorado
- Energy in Colorado
  - List of power stations in Colorado
  - Solar power in Colorado
  - Wind power in Colorado
- Health care in Colorado
  - Hospitals in Colorado
- Mining in Colorado
  - Coal mining in Colorado
  - Gold mining in Colorado
  - Silver mining in Colorado
  - Uranium mining in Colorado
- Transportation in Colorado
  - Airports in Colorado
  - Roads in Colorado
    - Interstate Highways in Colorado
    - U.S. Highways in Colorado
    - State highways in Colorado
    - List of Colorado Scenic and Historic Byways
- Water in Colorado

== Education in Colorado ==
Education in Colorado

- Schools in Colorado
  - Colorado public school districts
    - Colorado charter schools
  - Colleges and universities in Colorado
    - Adams State College
    - Aims Community College
    - Arapahoe Community College
    - Art Institute of Colorado
    - Belleview College
    - Colorado Christian University
    - Colorado College
    - Colorado Mesa University
    - Colorado Mountain College
    - Colorado Northwestern Community College
    - Colorado School of Mines
    - Colorado State University System
      - Colorado State University
      - Colorado State University-Pueblo
    - Colorado Technical University
    - Community College of Aurora
    - Community College of Denver
    - Denver Seminary
    - DeVry University
    - Fort Lewis College
    - Front Range Community College
    - Greendale Community College
    - Heritage College & Heritage Institute
    - Iliff School of Theology
    - Johnson & Wales University
    - Jones International University
    - Lamar Community College
    - Lincoln College of Technology
    - Metropolitan State University of Denver
    - Morgan Community College
    - Naropa University
    - National Technological University
    - Nazarene Bible College
    - Northeastern Junior College
    - Otero College
    - Pikes Peak State College
    - Pueblo Community College
    - Red Rocks Community College
    - Redstone College
    - Regis University
    - Rocky Mountain College of Art and Design
    - Rocky Vista University College of Osteopathic Medicine
    - Trinidad State College
    - United States Air Force Academy
    - University of Colorado System
      - University of Colorado at Boulder
      - University of Colorado at Colorado Springs
      - University of Colorado Denver
        - Anschutz Medical Campus
        - Auraria Campus
    - University of Denver
    - University of Northern Colorado
    - Western State College
  - High schools in Colorado
  - Parochial schools in Colorado
  - Private schools in Colorado

== See also ==
- Colorado
  - Outline of Colorado
    - Index of Colorado-related articles
  - Bibliography of Colorado
  - Climate change in Colorado
  - Colorado statistical areas
    - Front Range Urban Corridor
      - North Central Colorado Urban Area
      - South Central Colorado Urban Area
  - Geography of Colorado
  - Geology of Colorado
  - History of Colorado
    - List of territorial claims and designations in Colorado
    - National Register of Historic Places listings in Colorado
    - Prehistory of Colorado
    - Timeline of Colorado history
  - List of cities and towns in Colorado
    - List of adjectivals and demonyms for Colorado cities
    - List of census-designated places in Colorado
    - List of city nicknames in Colorado
    - List of Colorado municipalities by county
    - Commons:Category:Cities in Colorado
  - List of counties in Colorado
    - Commons:Category:Counties of Colorado
  - List of forts in Colorado
  - List of ghost towns in Colorado
  - List of places in Colorado
  - Paleontology in Colorado
