= List of city nicknames in Colorado =

Coordinates: 38.9972°N 105.5478°W

The location of the State of Colorado in the United States of America.

This partial list of city nicknames in Colorado includes some of the sobriquets, pseudonyms, and slogans that identify, or have identified, the cities and towns of the U.S. state of Colorado. City nicknames can help in establishing a civic identity, helping outsiders recognize a community or attracting people to a community because of its nickname; promote civic pride; and build community unity. Nicknames and slogans that successfully create a new community "ideology or myth" are also believed to have economic value. Their economic value is difficult to measure, but there are anecdotal reports of cities that have achieved substantial economic benefits by "branding" themselves by adopting new slogans.

Some unofficial nicknames are positive, while others are derisive. The unofficial nicknames listed here have been in use for a long time or have gained wide currency.

== Nicknames by city ==
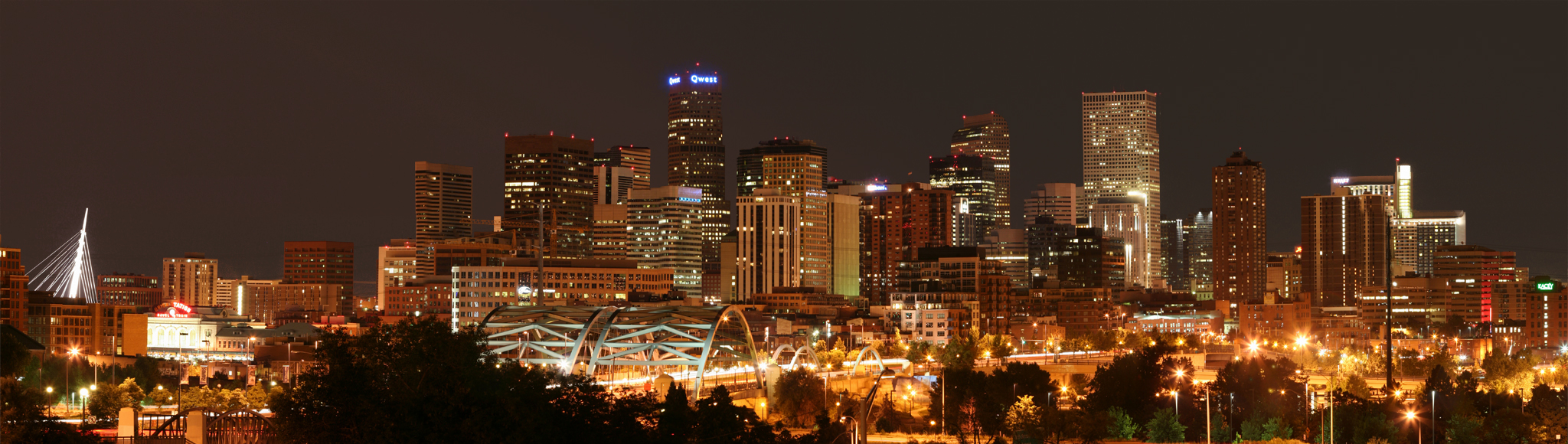
The Mile High City – Denver, Colorado, USA

=== A ===
- Alamosa – Gateway to the Great Sand Dunes
- Alma – As High As You Can Get
- Arvada – Celery Capital of the World (historical)
- Aspen – America's Canary City
- Ault – A Unique Little Town
- Aurora – Gateway to the Rockies

=== B ===
- Berthoud – Garden Spot of Colorado
- Black Hawk – City of Mills (historical)
- Boulder – The People's Republic of Boulder, Ann Arbor of the West
- Breckenridge – The Kingdom of Breckenridge

=== C ===
- Cañon City – Climate Capital of Colorado
- Carbondale – Ultimate Rocky Mountain Hideout
- Cedaredge – Southern Gateway to the Grand Mesa
- Central City – Richest square mile on Earth (historical)
- Colorado Springs
  - City of Millionaires (historical)
  - Little London
  - Newport in the Rockies (historical)
  - The Springs
- Creede – There is no night in Creede (historical)
- Crested Butte
  - Colorado's Last Great Ski Town
  - Wildflower Capital of Colorado

=== D ===
- Deer Trail – Home of the World's First Rodeo
- Denver
  - The Mile-High City
  - Queen City of the Plains (historical)
  - Queen City of the West
  - Broncoville
  - Wall Street of the West
  - Cow Town
- Dove Creek – Pinto Bean Capital of the World
- Durango – Durango Rocks!

=== E ===
- Edgewater – City of Choice

=== F ===
- Fairplay – The Real South Park
- Fort Collins
  - The Choice City
  - The Napa Valley of Beer
  - Fort Fun
  - FoCo
- Fort Morgan
  - The Capital of the Plains
  - The City of Lights
- Fruita – Home of Mike the Headless Chicken (historical)

=== G ===
- Grand Junction
  - Colorado's Wine Country
  - River City
- Greeley
  - City of Churches (historical)
  - Garden City of the West (historical)
- Golden – Where the West Lives
- Gunnison – Gun Rack or Gunniicicle

=== L ===
- Leadville – Magic City
- Limon – The Hub City of the Plains
- Longmont
  - Longtucky
  - The Long Apple
- Loveland
  - Gateway to the Rockies
  - The Sweetheart City
- Lyons – Double Gateway to the Rockies (or Double Gateway to Rocky Mountain National Park)

=== M ===
- Manitou Springs – Saratoga of the West

=== N ===
- Nederland
  - Home of the Frozen Dead Guy
  - Ned

=== O ===
- Ouray – Switzerland of America

=== P ===
- Palisade – Peach Capital of Colorado
- Pueblo
  - Home of Heroes
  - Pride City
  - Steel City of the West (historical)
  - Little Chicago
  - Pittsburgh of the West

=== S ===
- Severance – Where the geese fly and the bulls cry
- Steamboat Springs
  - Ski Town USA
  - The Boat
- Sterling – A Colorado treasure

=== T ===
- Tarryall – Grab-all (historical)
- Telluride – To-hell-you-ride (historical)

=== V ===
- Victor – City of Gold Mines

=== W ===
- Wheat Ridge – Carnation Capital of the World (historical)
- Woodland Park – The City Above The Clouds

== See also ==
- Bibliography of Colorado
- Geography of Colorado
- History of Colorado
- Index of Colorado-related articles
- List of Colorado-related lists
- Outline of Colorado
