= List of mammals of Colorado =

Coordinates: 38.9972°N 105.5478°W

Colorado in the United States

This list of mammals of Colorado includes every wild mammal species seen in the U.S. state of Colorado, based on the list published by Colorado Parks and Wildlife. It does not include species found only in captivity. Species in this list are grouped by order and then by family within each order. The common name for each species is followed by its binomial name.

The following codes are used to designate some species:

- EN - Species is listed as endangered by the IUCN.
- NT - Species is listed as near threatened by the IUCN.

== Didelphimorphia ==
=== Opossums ===
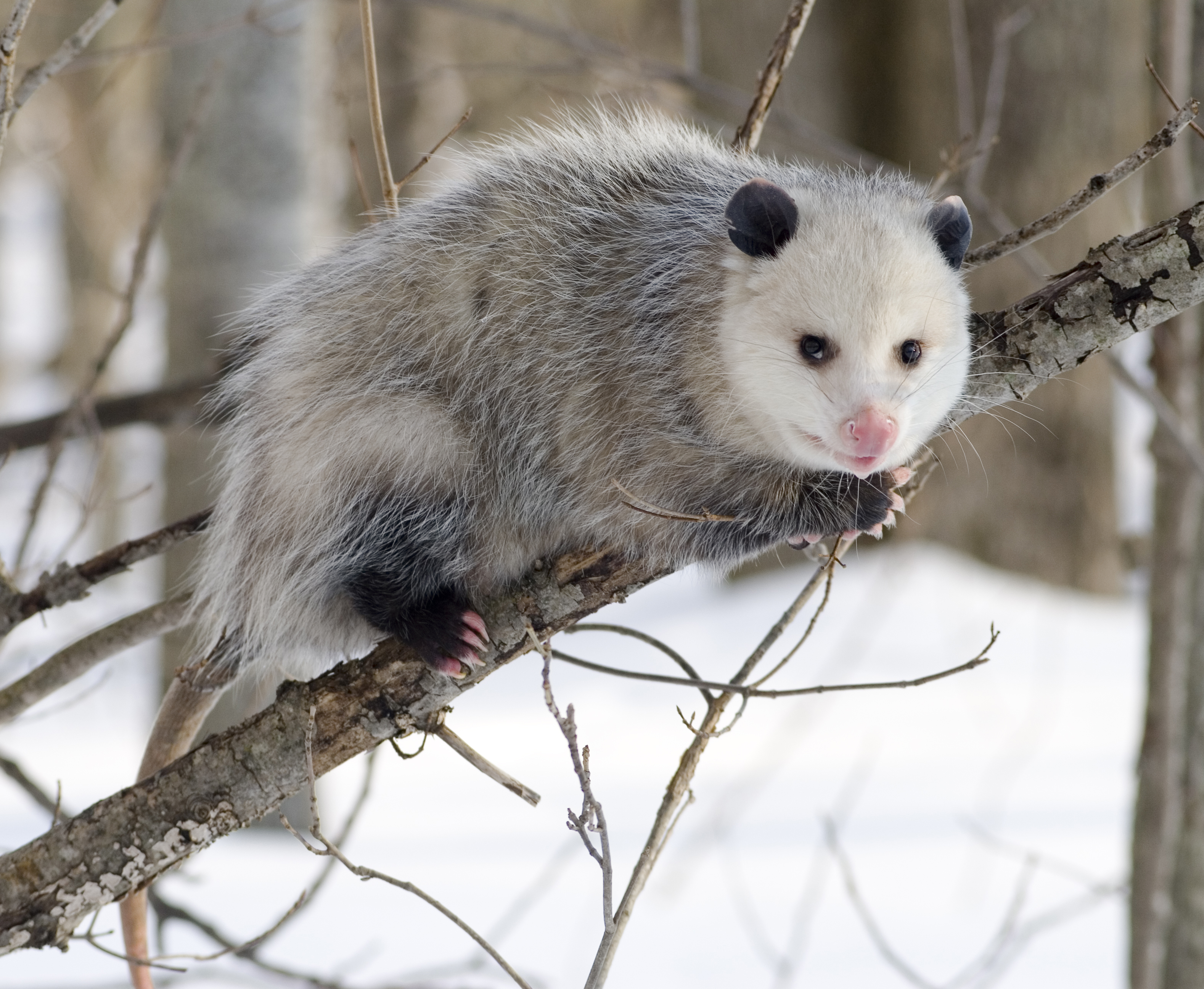
Opossum

Order: Didelphimorphia Family: Didelphidae

- Virginia opossum, Didelphis virginiana

== Cingulata ==
=== Armadillos ===
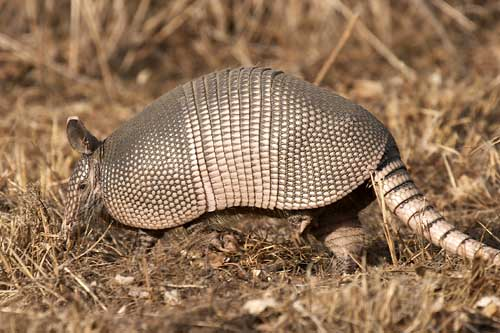
Nine-banded armadillo

Order: Cingulata Family: Dasypodidae

- Nine-banded armadillo, Dasypus novemcinctus

== Rodentia ==
=== Beavers ===
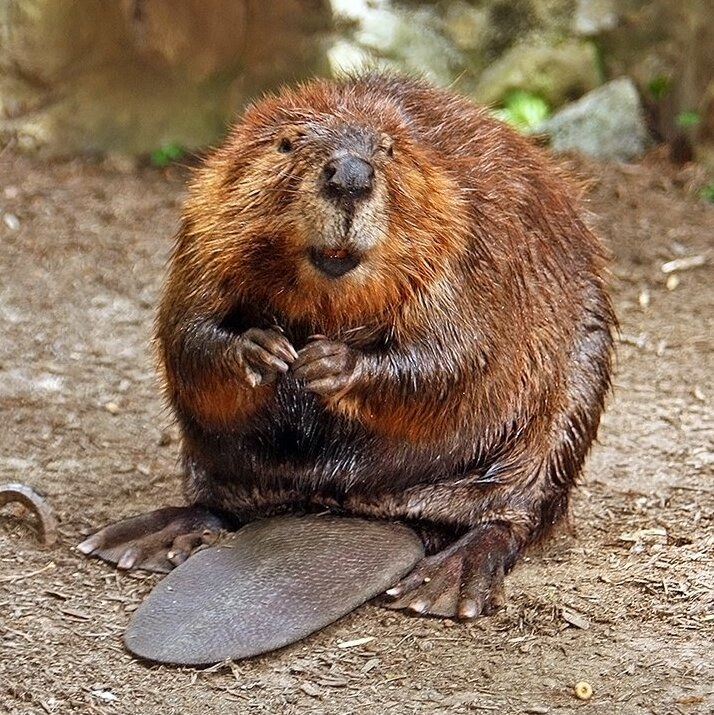
Beaver

Order: Rodentia Family: Castoridae

- North American beaver, Castor canadensis

=== Pocket gophers ===
Order: Rodentia Family: Geomyidae

- Yellow-faced pocket gopher, Cratogeomys castanops
- Plains pocket gopher, Geomys bursarius
- Botta's pocket gopher, Thomomys bottae
- Northern pocket gopher, Thomomys talpoides

=== Kangaroo rats, pocket mice ===
Order: Rodentia Family: Heteromyidae

- Hispid pocket mouse, Chaetodipus hispidus
- Ord's kangaroo rat, Dipodomys ordii
- Olive-backed pocket mouse, Perognathus fasciatus
- Plains pocket mouse, Perognathus flavescens
- Silky pocket mouse, Perognathus flavus
- Great Basin pocket mouse, Perognathus merriami

=== New World porcupines ===
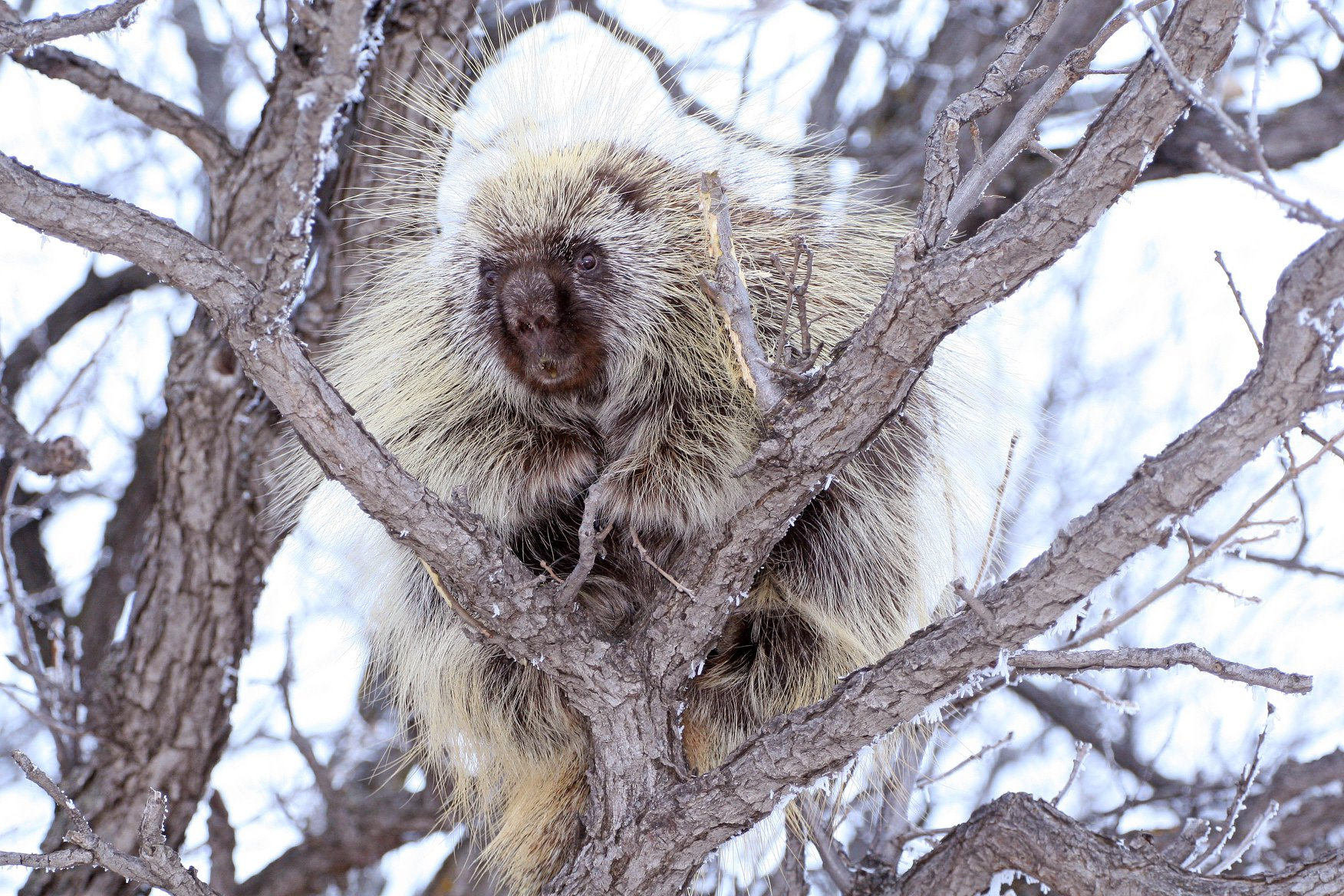
Porcupine

Order: Rodentia Family: Erethizontidae

- North American porcupine, Erethizon dorsatum

=== Jumping mice ===
Order: Rodentia Family: Dipodidae

- Meadow jumping mouse, Zapus hudsonius
- Western jumping mouse, Zapus princeps

=== New World rats, New World mice, voles ===
Order: Rodentia Family: Cricetidae

- Sagebrush vole, Lemmiscus curtatus
- Long-tailed vole, Microtus longicaudus
- Mexican vole, Microtus mexicanus
- Montane vole, Microtus montanus
- Prairie vole, Microtus ochrogaster
- Meadow vole, Microtus pennsylvanicus
- Southern red-backed vole, Myodes gapperii
- White-throated woodrat, Neotoma albigula
- Bushy-tailed woodrat, Neotoma cinerea
- Eastern woodrat, Neotoma floridana
- Desert woodrat, Neotoma lepida
- Mexican woodrat, Neotoma mexicana
- Southern plains woodrat, Neotoma micropus
- Muskrat, Ondatra zibethicus
- Northern grasshopper mouse, Onychomys leucogaster
- Brush mouse, Peromyscus boylii
- Canyon mouse, Peromyscus crinitus
- White-footed mouse, Peromyscus leucopus
- Northern rock mouse, Peromyscus nasutus
- Western deer mouse, Peromyscus sonoriensis
- Pinyon mouse, Peromyscus truei
- Western heather vole, Phenacomys intermedius
- Western harvest mouse, Reithrodontomys megalotis
- Plains harvest mouse, Reithrodontomys montanus
- Hispid cotton rat, Sigmodon hispidus

=== Chipmunks, marmots, squirrels ===
Order: Rodentia Family: Sciuridae

- White-tailed antelope squirrel, Ammospermophilus leucurus
- Golden-mantled ground squirrel, Callospermophilus lateralis
- Gunnison's prairie dog, Cynomys gunnisoni
- White-tailed prairie dog, Cynomys leucurus
- Black-tailed prairie dog, Cynomys ludovicianus
- Northern flying squirrel, Glaucomys sabrinus
- Thirteen-lined ground squirrel, Ictodomys tridecemlineatus
- Yellow-bellied marmot, Marmota flaviventris
- Cliff chipmunk, Neotamias dorsalis
- Least chipmunk, Neotamias minimus
- Colorado chipmunk, Neotamias quadrivittatus
- Hopi chipmunk, Neotamias rufus
- Uinta chipmunk, Neotamias umbrinus
- Rock squirrel, Otospermophilus variegatus
- Abert's squirrel, Sciurus aberti
- Fox squirrel, Sciurus niger
- Southwestern red squirrel, Tamiasciurus fremonti
- American red squirrel, Tamiasciurus hudsonicus
- Wyoming ground squirrel, Urocitellus elegans
- Spotted ground squirrel, Xerospermophilus spilosoma

== Lagomorpha ==
=== Pikas ===
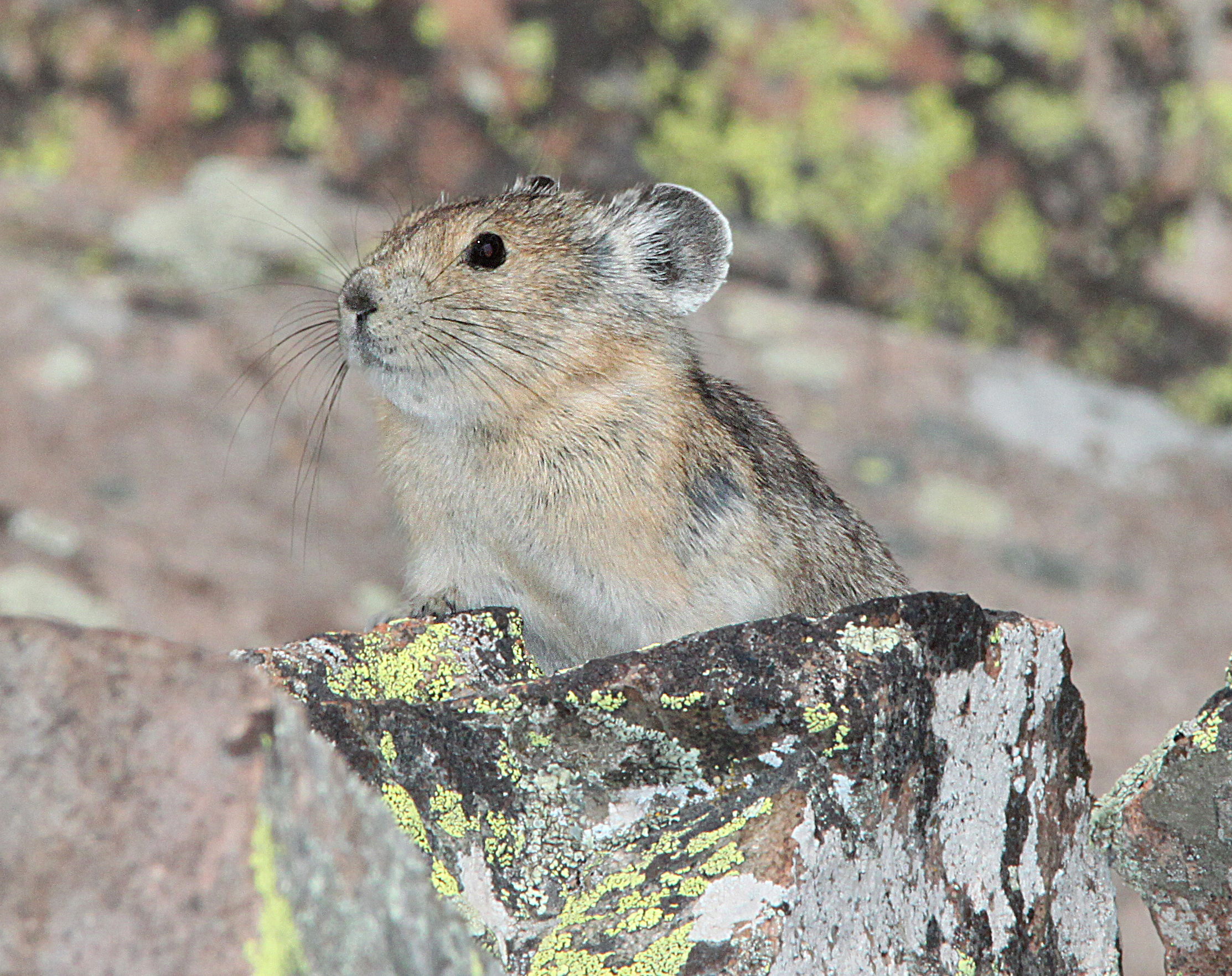
Pika

Order: Lagomorpha Family: Ochotonidae

- American pika, Ochotona princeps

=== Hares, rabbits ===
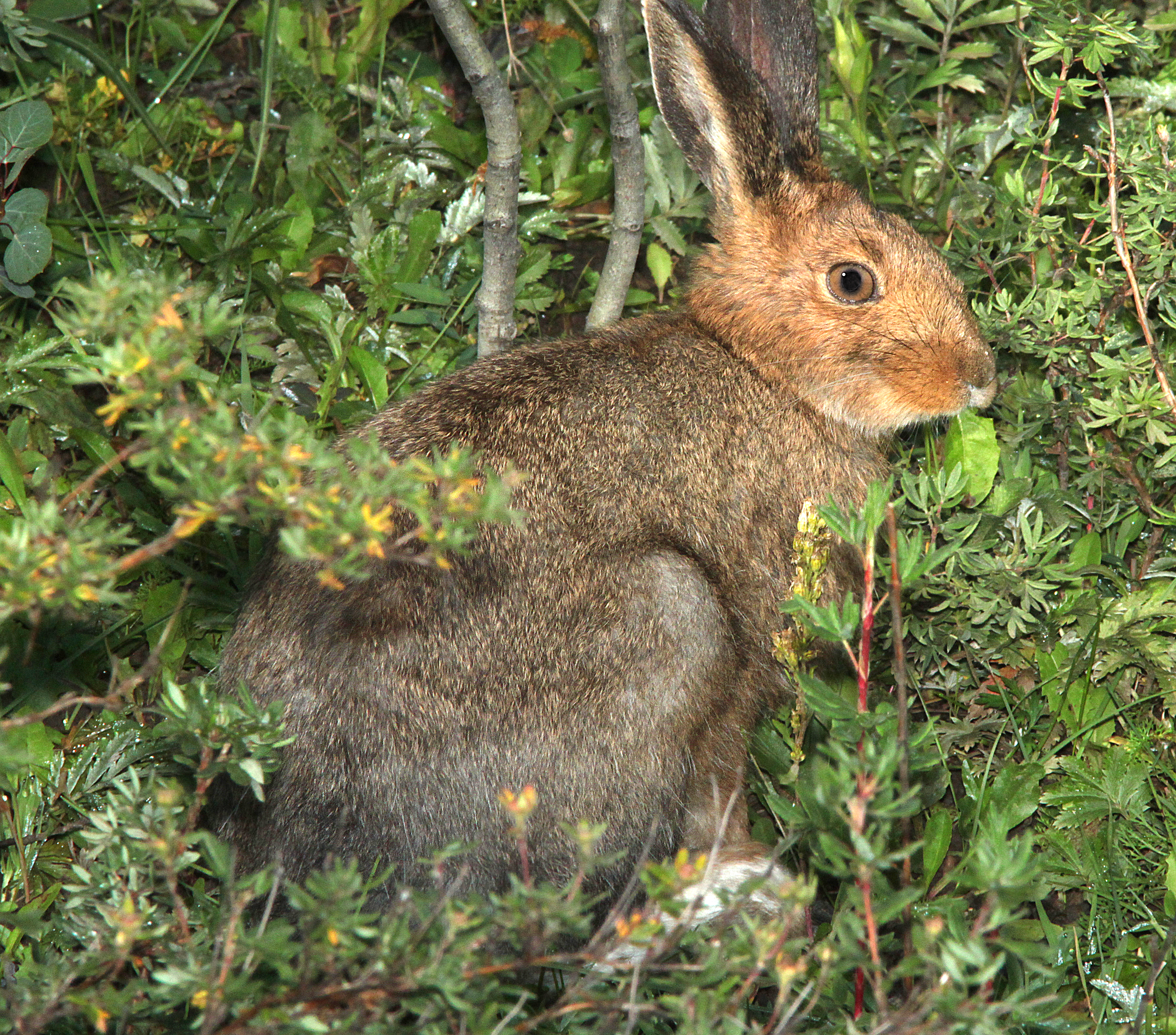
Snowshoe hare during summer months

Order: Lagomorpha Family: Leporidae

- Pygmy rabbit, Brachylagus idahodensis
- Snowshoe hare, Lepus americanus
- Black-tailed jackrabbit, Lepus californicus
- White-tailed jackrabbit, Lepus townsendii
- Desert cottontail, Sylvilagus audubonii
- Eastern cottontail, Sylvilagus floridanus
- Mountain cottontail, Sylvilagus nuttallii

== Eulipotyphla ==
=== Shrews ===
Order: Eulipotyphla Family: Soricidae

- Elliot's short-tailed shrew, Blarina hylophaga
- North American least shrew, Cryptotis parva
- Crawford's gray shrew, Notiosorex crawfordi
- Cinereus shrew, Sorex cinereus
- American pygmy shrew, Sorex hoyi
- Merriam's shrew, Sorex merriami
- Montane shrew, Sorex monticolus
- Dwarf shrew, Sorex nanus
- American water shrew, Sorex palustris

=== Moles ===
Order: Eulipotyphla Family: Talpidae

- Eastern mole, Scalopus aquaticus

== Chiroptera ==
=== Vesper bats ===
Order: Chiroptera Family: Vespertilionidae

- Silver-haired bat, Lasionycteris noctivagans
- California myotis, Myotis californicus
- Western small-footed myotis, Myotis ciliolabrum
- Long-eared myotis, Myotis evotis
- Little brown bat, Myotis lucifugus
- Fringed myotis, Myotis thysanodes
- Long-legged myotis, Myotis volans
- Yuma myotis, Myotis yumanensis
- Pallid bat, Antrozous pallidus
- Big brown bat, Eptesicus fuscus
- Spotted bat, Euderma maculatum
- Eastern red bat, Lasiurus borealis
- Hoary bat, Lasiurus cinereus
- Western pipistrelle, Parastrellus hesperus
- Tricolored bat, Perimyotis subflavus
- Townsend's big-eared bat, Corynorhinus townsendii

=== Free-tailed bats ===
Order: Chiroptera Family: Molossidae

- Big free-tailed bat, Nyctinomops macrotis
- Mexican free-tailed bat, Tadarida brasiliensis

== Carnivora ==
=== Cats ===
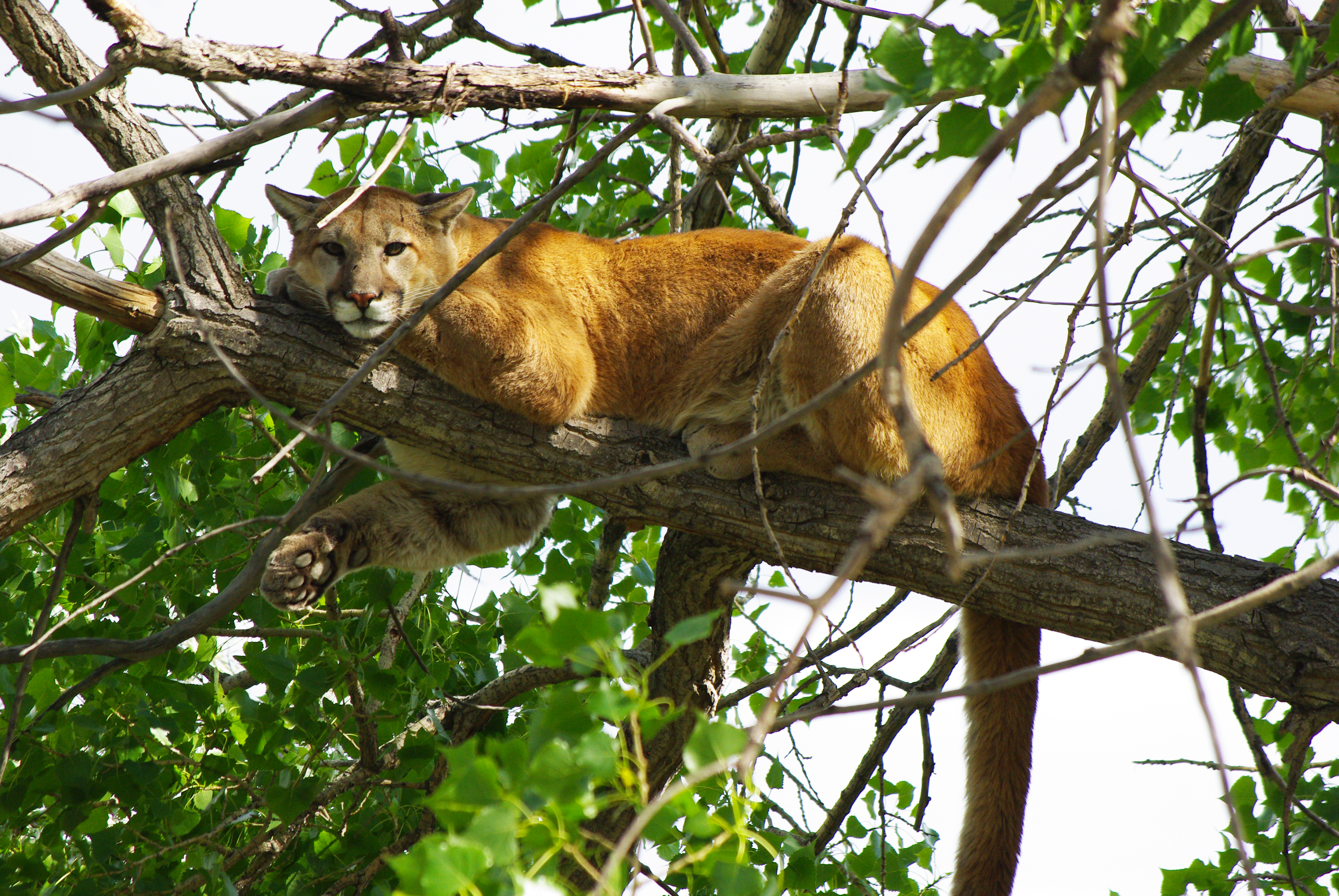
Cougar

Order: Carnivora Family: Felidae

- Canada lynx, Lynx canadensis reintroduced
- Bobcat, Lynx rufus
- Cougar, Puma concolor

=== Canids ===
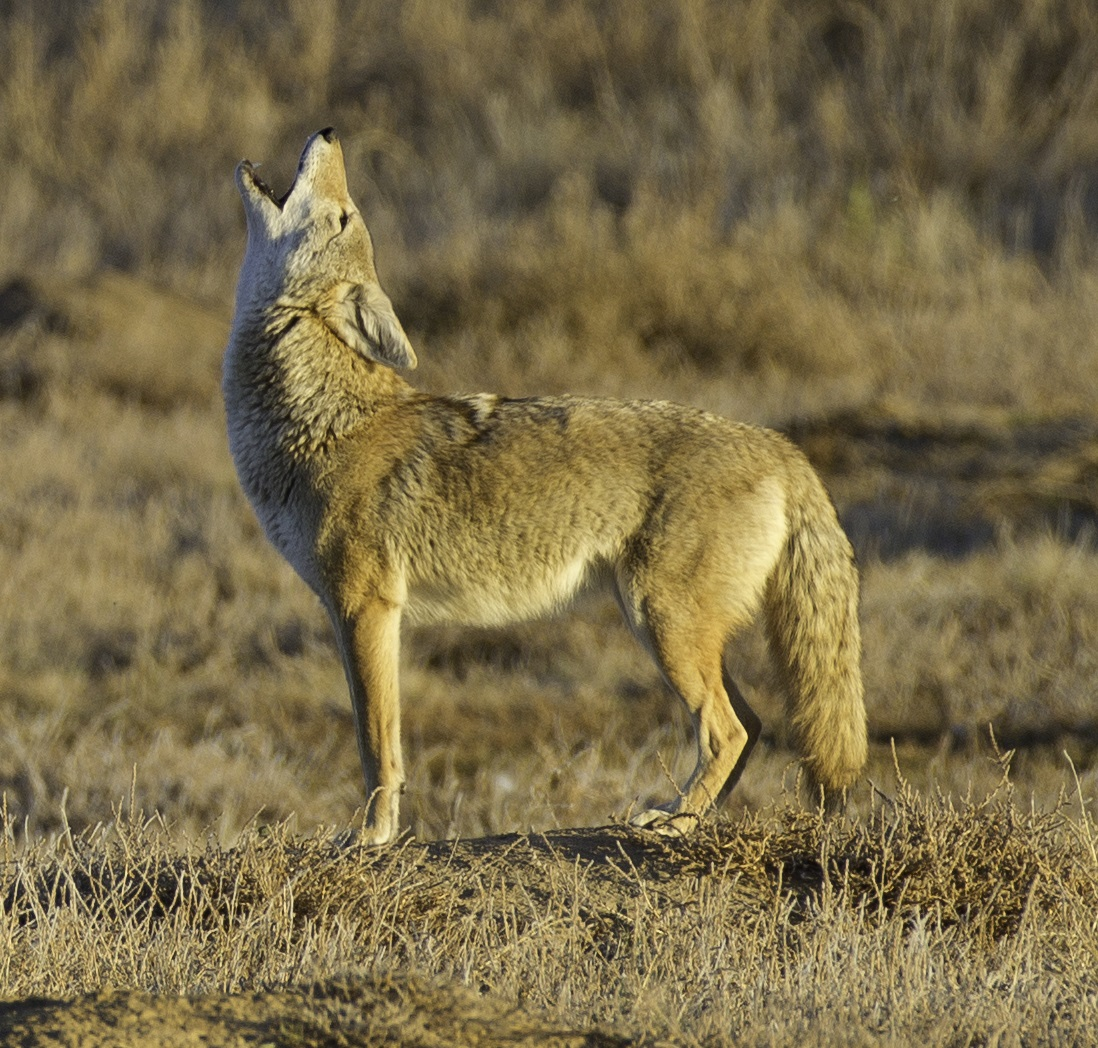
Coyote

Order: Carnivora Family: Canidae

- Coyote, Canis latrans
- Gray wolf, Canis lupus reintroduced
  - Northwestern wolf, C. l. occidentalis
  - Great Plains wolf, C. l. nubilus EX
  - Southern Rocky Mountain wolf, C. l. youngi EX
- Gray fox, Urocyon cinereoargenteus
- Kit fox, Vulpes macrotis
- Swift fox, Vulpes velox
- Red fox, Vulpes vulpes

=== Bears ===
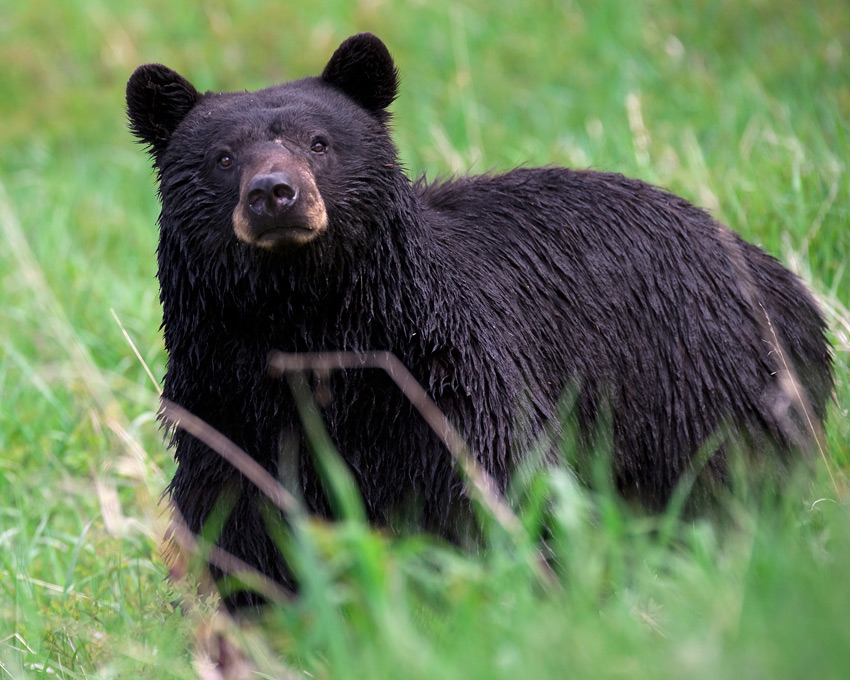
Black bear

Order: Carnivora Family: Ursidae

- American black bear, Ursus americanus
- Brown bear, Ursus arctos extirpated
  - Grizzly bear, U. a. horribilis extirpated

=== Skunks ===
Order: Carnivora Family: Mephitidae

- American hog-nosed skunk, Conepatus leuconotus
- Striped skunk, Mephitis mephitis
- Western spotted skunk, Spilogale gracilis
- Eastern spotted skunk, Spilogale putorius

=== Weasels ===
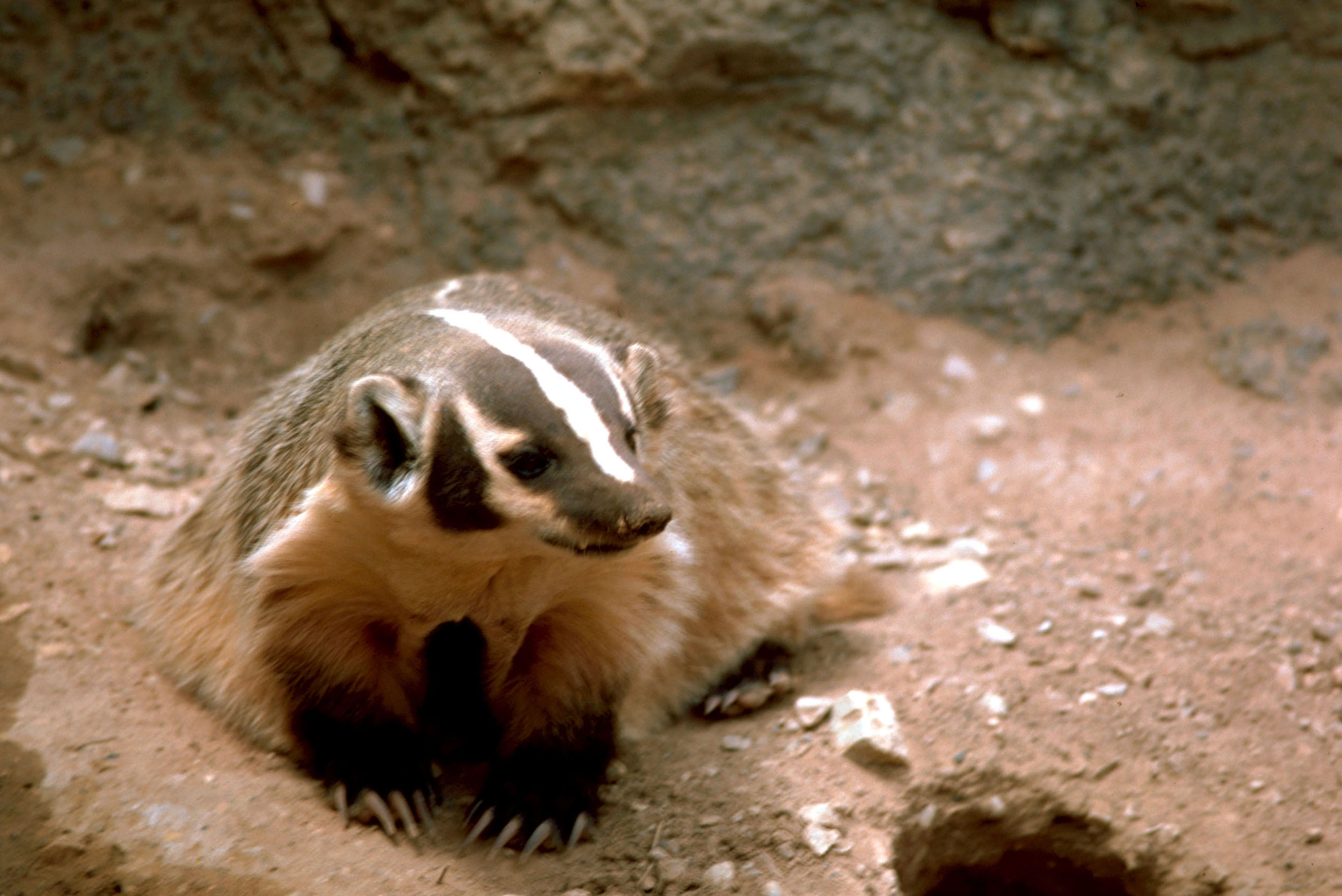
Badger

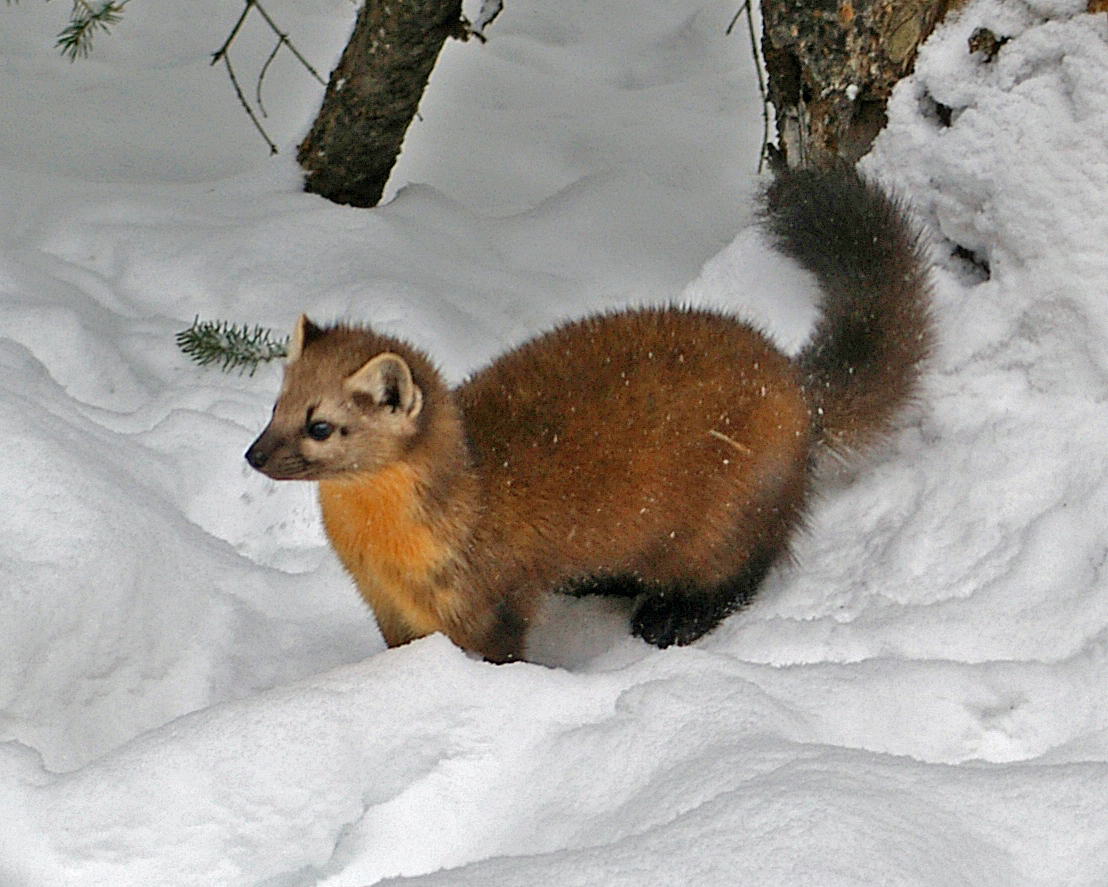
Marten

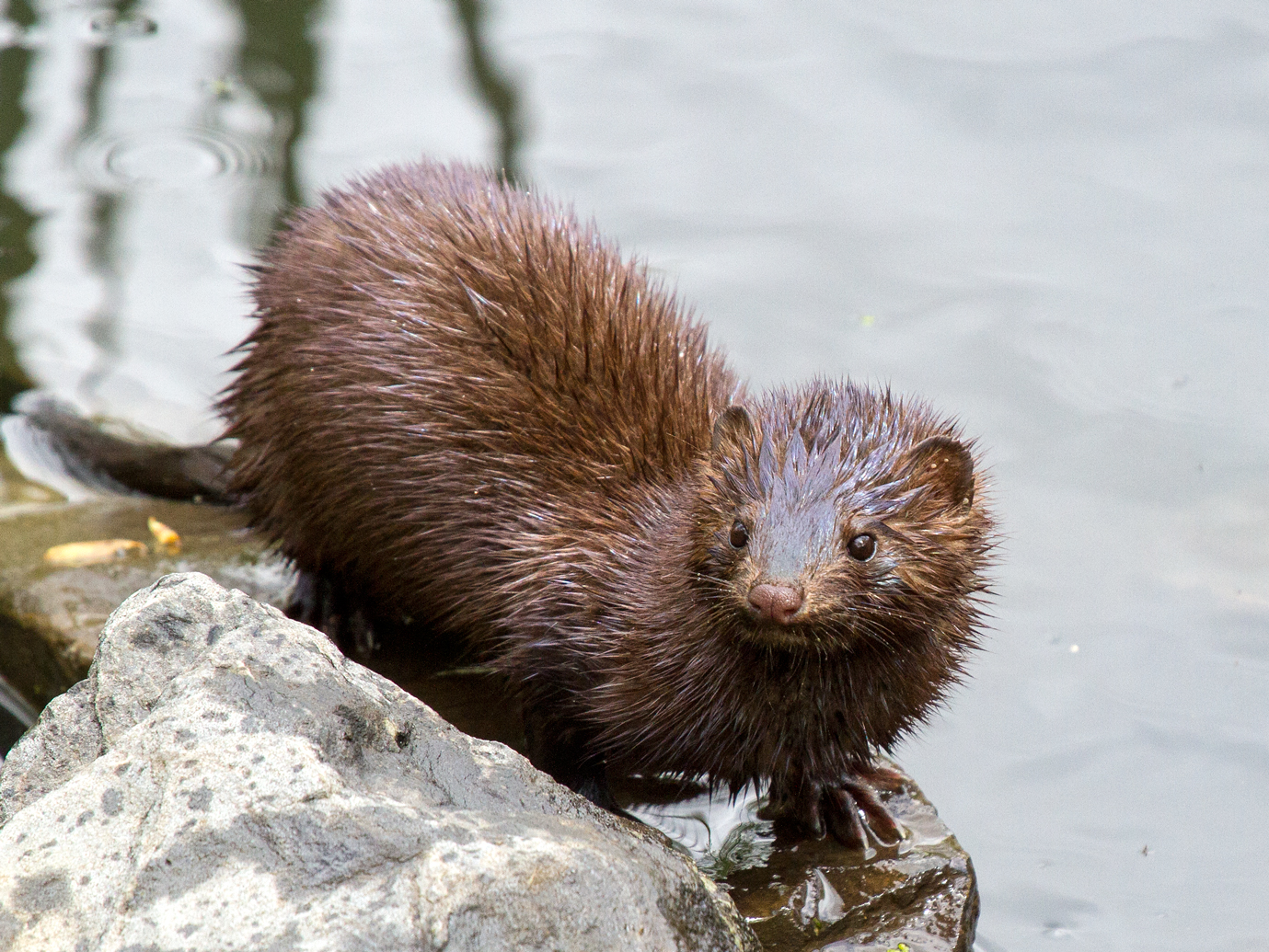
Mink

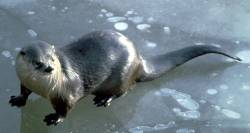
North American river otter

Order: Carnivora Family: Mustelidae

- Wolverine, Gulo gulo extirpated
- North American river otter, Lontra canadensis
- Pacific marten, Martes caurina
- Black-footed ferret, Mustela nigripes reintroduced
- American ermine, Mustela richardsonii
- Long-tailed weasel, Neogale frenata
- American mink, Neogale vison
- American badger, Taxidea taxus

=== Procyonids ===
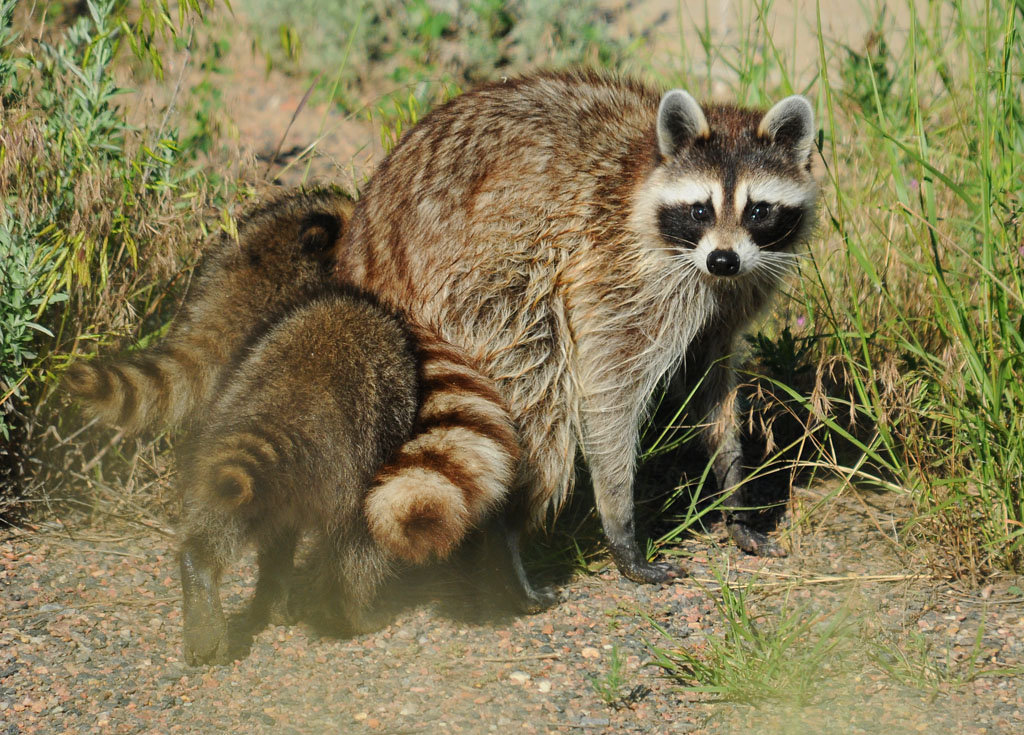
Common raccoon

Order: Carnivora Family: Procyonidae

- Ringtail, Bassariscus astutus
- Raccoon, Procyon lotor

== Artiodactyla ==
=== Pronghorns ===
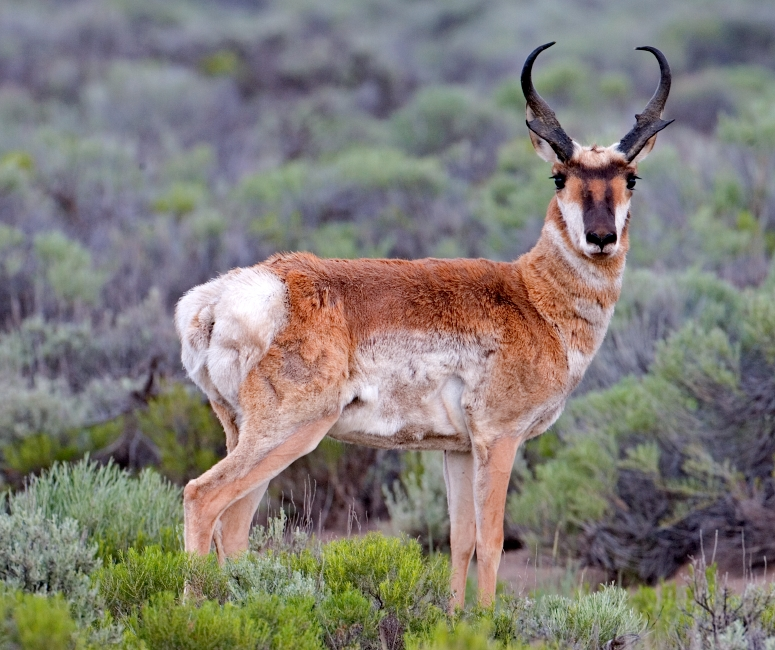
Pronghorn

Order: Artiodactyla Family: Antilocapridae

- Pronghorn, Antilocapra americana
  - Rocky Mountain pronghorn, A. a. americana

=== Deer ===
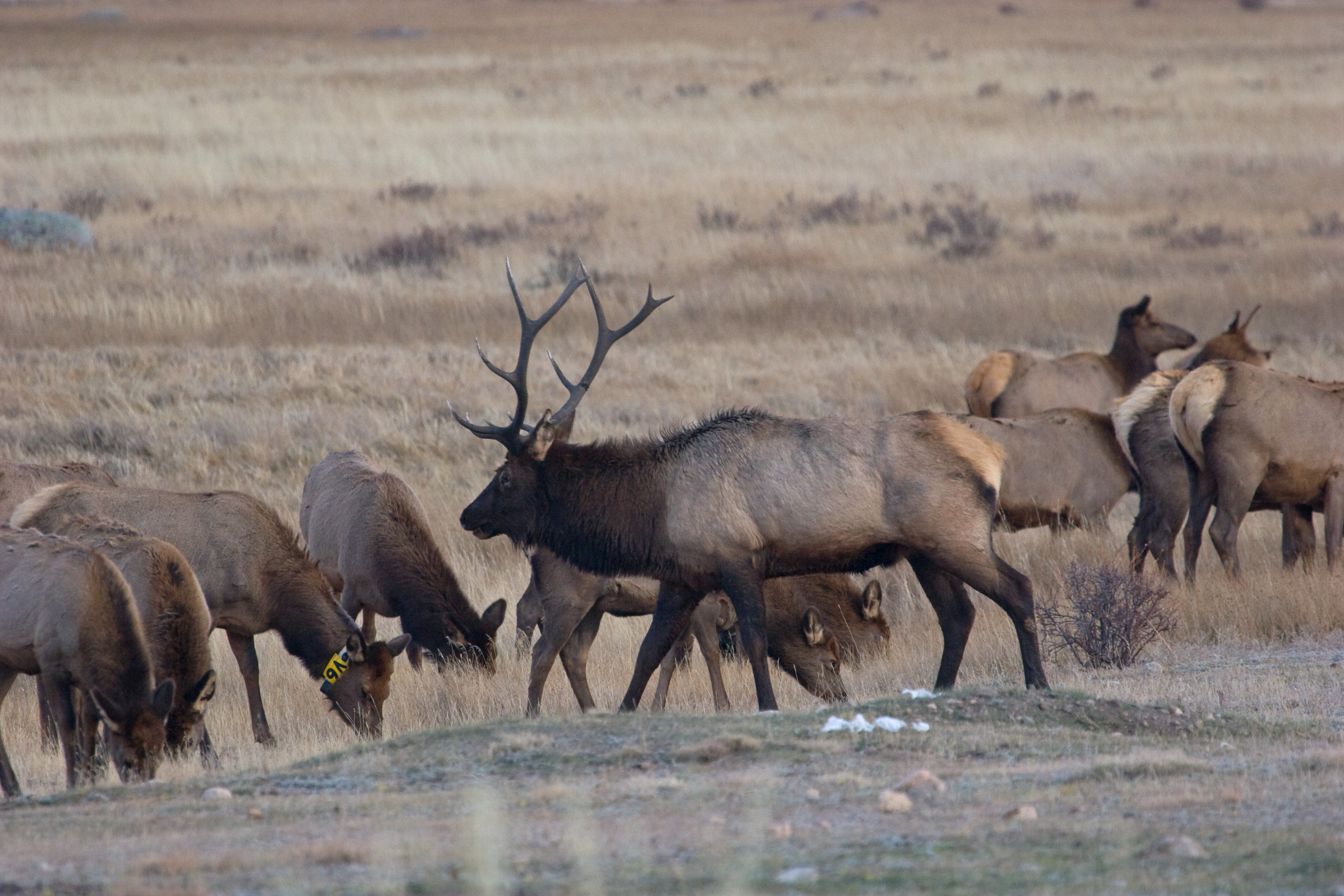
Rocky Mountain elk

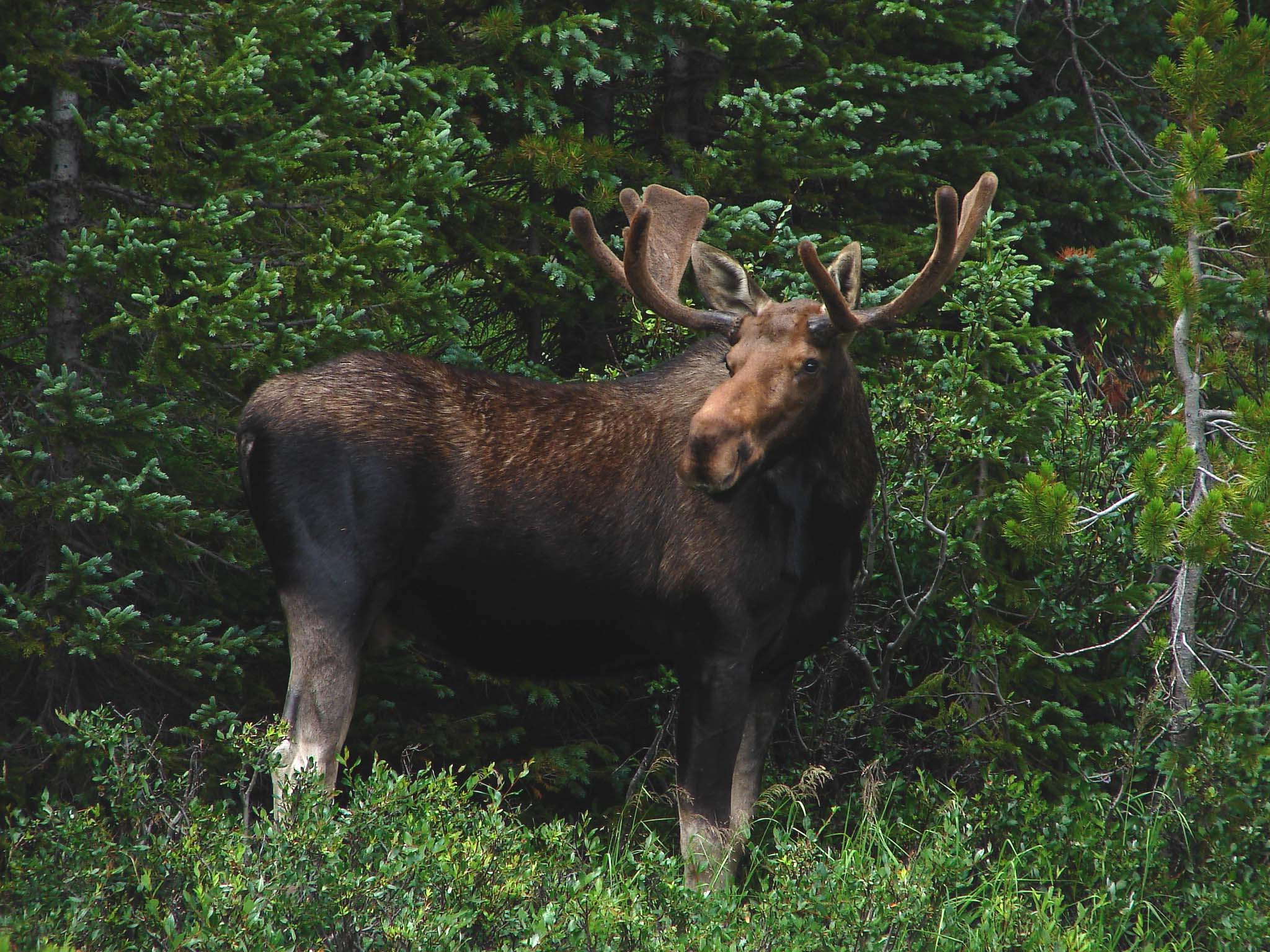
Moose

Order: Artiodactyla Family: Cervidae

- Moose, Alces alces
- Elk, Cervus canadensis
- Mule deer, Odocoileus hemionus
- White-tailed deer, Odocoileus virginianus

=== Bovids ===
The bighorn sheep is the state mammal of Colorado

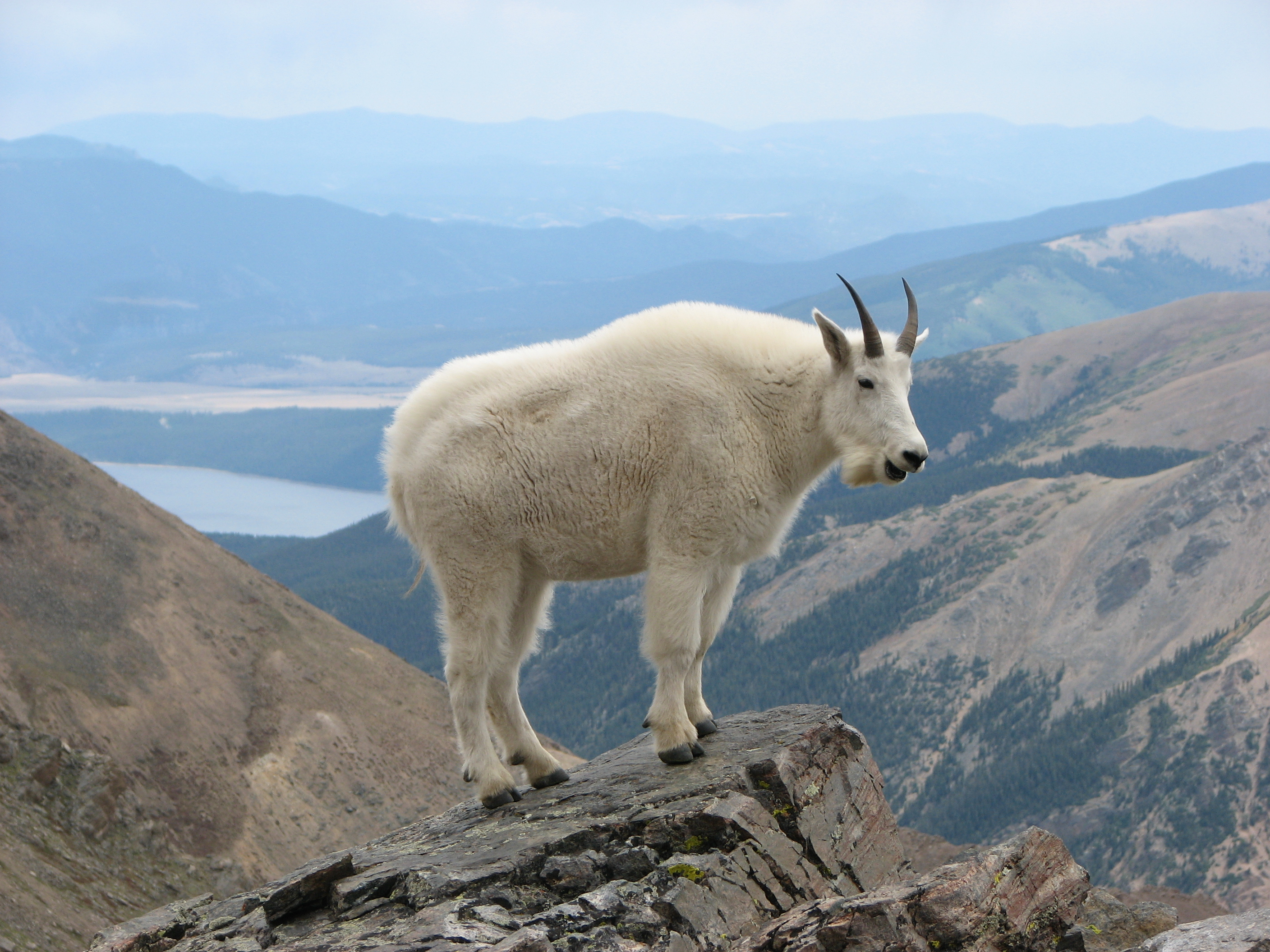
Mountain goat

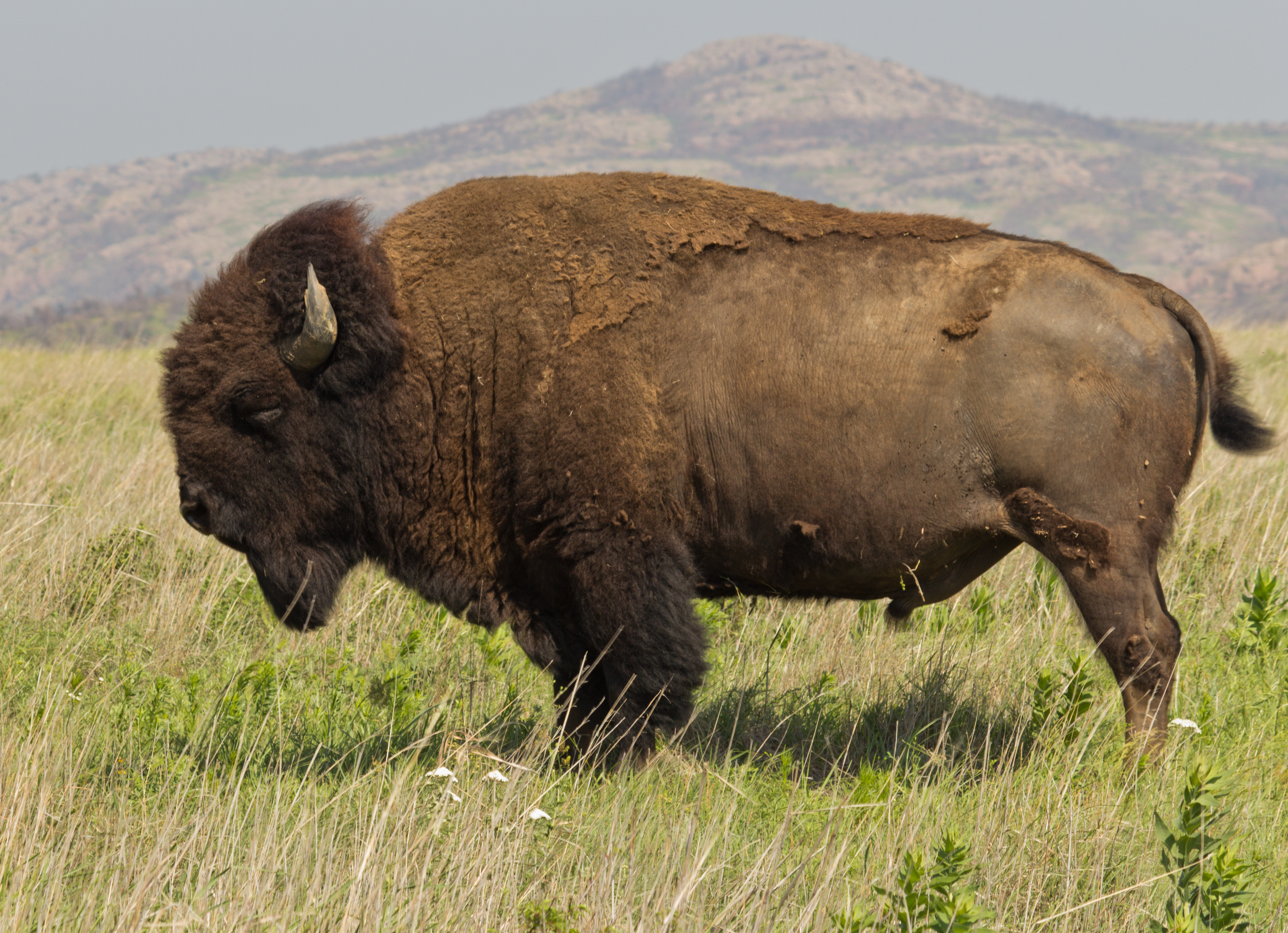
Bison

Order: Artiodactyla Family: Bovidae

- American bison, Bison bison reintroduced
- Mountain goat, Oreamnos americanus introduced
- Bighorn sheep, Ovis canadensis

== See also ==
- List of chordate orders
- List of regional mammals lists
- Mammal classification
- Bibliography of Colorado
- Geography of Colorado
- History of Colorado
- Index of Colorado-related articles
- List of Colorado-related lists
- Outline of Colorado
