= History of railroads in Colorado =

The history of rail transportation in Colorado began with the competition between two separate railways in the late 1860s the Denver Pacific Railroad and the Colorado Central and Pacific Railroad. Following the decision of the Union Pacific Railroad to route the transcontinental railroad through Cheyenne, Wyoming instead of Denver, the first town in the Front Range area to construct a connecting line to the Union Pacific Railroad would more naturally become the economic focus of the Colorado Territory. The Colorado Central and Pacific Railway was incorporated in 1865 by residents of Golden, however this railway was unable to immediately begin constructing a connecting line to Cheyenne. The existence of the Colorado Central and Pacific Railroad prompted the citizens of Denver to incorporate the Denver Pacific Railroad on November 19, 1867. Following a spirited campaign raising capital, the Denver Pacific Railroad laid its first track in 1869. By June 26, 1870, the Denver Pacific Railroad was completed.

== See also ==
- List of Colorado railroads
