= Electoral reform in Colorado =

U.S. state electoral reform

Electoral reform in Colorado refers to efforts to change the voting laws in the Centennial State.

== National Popular Vote ==
In 2006, the Colorado Senate passed a bill to join the National Popular Vote Interstate Compact but it failed in the Colorado House of Representatives.

On 17 March 2009, the Colorado House of Representatives passed legislation to allocate Colorado's electoral votes to the winner of the nationwide popular vote. The legislation faced criticism from Republican lawmakers and never passed the state Senate.

During the 2019 Regular Session of the Colorado General Assembly, the General Assembly passed the National Popular Vote Act, which Governor Jared Polis signed into law. This legislation added Colorado to the National Popular Vote Interstate Compact. Following Governor Polis's enactment of the legislation, opponents gathered nearly 229,000 signatures to place the issue on the 2020 ballot.

The issue, appearing as Colorado Proposition 113, was approved during the November 3, 2020 election, with 1,644,716 (52.33%) voting in favor and 1,498,500 (47.67%) voting against.

== Ranked-choice voting ==
In response to the 2020 Democratic Primary, Democratic leaders in the Colorado General Assembly and the Colorado Secretary of State Griswold expressed interest in considering ranked-choice voting (RCV) at the state level. Secretary Griswold has also established a committee to consider new election methods. Any statewide changes to the elections process would have to be approved by the legislature or by voter approval. In response to the 2020 Democratic Party presidential primaries, lawmakers began discussions about RCV (specifically the instant-runoff voting method), with some academics expressing concerns about "wasted votes" for candidates who terminated their candidacy after voters began casting their ballots through early voting and mail-in voting. Colorado State Senator Julie Gonzales expressed interest in establishing RCV in Colorado through the General Assembly.

In February 2020, a potential ballot initiative was filed with the state of Colorado to establish ranked-choice voting for U.S. House of Representatives races.

In 2008, Telluride began using RCV but ceased the process after their November 2019 mayoral election due to concerns over the time-intensive hand-counting method for tallying RCV results.

In 2007, the Aspen City Council voted 5-0 to place a measure on the ballot to implement RCV in elections. Aspen voters changed their mind in 2010 and repealed the measure by a large margin.

Carbondale and Basalt both use RCV for mayoral races with three or more candidates.

=== Proposition 131 (2024) ===
On November 5, 2024, Colorado voters rejected Proposition 131, a statutory ballot measure that would have created all-candidate primaries for certain federal and state offices and used ranked-choice voting in the general election. The measure received 1,385,060 yes votes and 1,595,256 no votes.

== Amendments and Ballot Initiatives ==
=== Amendment 36 (2004) ===
2004's Amendment 36, if enacted, would have theoretically allowed a third party candidate to receive an electoral vote if they received 12% of the popular vote in Colorado. Opponents harbored concerns that the amendment, if adopted, could affect the outcome of the 2004 U.S. Presidential election. Regardless, the outcome of the election would not have been affected by the adoption of the amendment since none of the third party candidates achieved even 1% of the popular vote. The amendment failed by a large margin.

=== Initiative 104 (2020) ===
Initiative 104, which may be considered during Colorado's 2020 election, would establish approval voting for state elections in Colorado. Specifically, Initiative 104 would permit electors "to select as many choices as there are candidates" on a state ballot. This would modify existing state law, which only allows voters to select a single candidate. The initiative is currently "Approved for circulation" by the Secretary of State's office; it has not yet met the signature requirements to be on the 2020 ballot.

The ballot title for the initiative is:

A change to the Colorado Revised Statutes adopting approval voting, a voting method in which electors may cast votes for multiple candidates in each race in all state and local elections and the winner in each race is the candidate or, in the case of a multiple-seat race, candidates, receiving the highest number of votes cast.

— Ballot Title Setting Board (2 January 2020)

If passed by Colorado voters, Initiative 104 would go into effect on 1 January 2022.

== Redistricting ==
=== Amendments Y and Z ===
On 6 November 2018, Colorado voters approved two ballot initiatives to establish independent commissions for redrawing districts. Amendment Y established the Colorado Independent Congressional Redistricting Commission to draw U.S. Congressional Districts. Amendment Z established the Colorado Independent Legislative Redistricting Commission to draw state legislative boundaries. The umbrella organization overseeing the two commissions is called the Colorado Independent Redistricting Commissions. Both amendments prioritize competitiveness when redistricting and both passed with 71 percent of the vote.

The commissions are made up of the following members:

- 4 members of the state's largest political party
- 4 members of the state's second largest political party
- 4 members whom are not members of any political party

8 of 12 members (two of whom must not be affiliated with a political party) are required to approve a redistricting map. A panel of retired judges and a lottery system are used to choose members of the commission, which must have representation from every congressional district in the state. The commissions drew districts for the first time after the 2020 Census.

=== Colorado Reapportionment Commission ===
Prior to the passage of Amendments X and Y, Colorado's Reapportionment Commission drew legislative districts in the state. The Commission had 11 members with no explicit partisan makeup. The commission could have had up to 11 members of one political party.

== See also ==
- Colorado
- Electoral reform in the United States
