= Reunion, Commerce City, Colorado =

Coordinates: 39°53′17″N 104°46′53″W

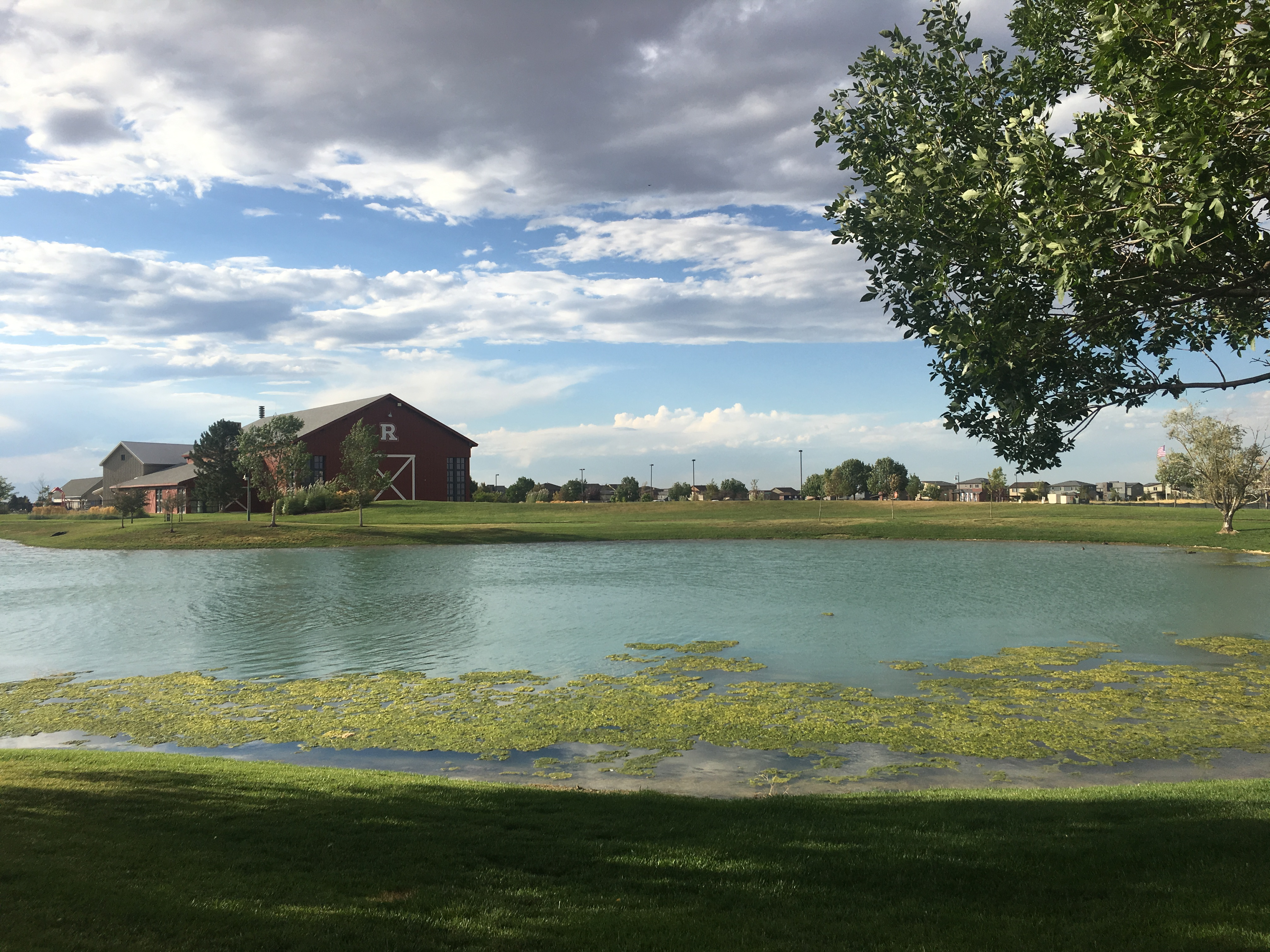
Reunion

Reunion is a master-planned community in Commerce City, Adams County, Colorado, United States. The Commerce City, Colorado Post Office (ZIP Code 80022) serves Reunion.

== History ==
=== Beginnings ===
Reunion is the name of a master planned community, developed by Shea Homes beginning in 2001. Previously the area was undeveloped agricultural land, between the cities of Commerce City and Brighton. In the 1980s, Commerce City annexed the land and included it into the city's boundaries.

== Governance and Community Covenant ==
Reunion is not an incorporated community. It is located within the city limits of Commerce City. The community utilizes fire from the South Adams County Fire Protection District and police protection of Commerce City. All public schools are part of the Brighton 27J School System.

As part of Commerce City, Reunion is ultimately governed by the City Council of Commerce City. In addition, all Reunion residents are asked to sign and follow a Community Covenant. This covenant places firm guidelines on such issues as housing decoration, fencing, and contribution to the area's library and recreation centers. The covenant is enforced by the Reunion Homeowner's Association, or "RHA".

== Boundaries ==
The generally accepted boundaries of the Reunion community are E-470 to the East, 112th Ave. to the North, Chambers Rd. to the West and (currently) 96th Ave. to the South. There are other undeveloped areas of Reunion that lie west of Chambers Rd and South of 104th Avenue.

== Schools ==
=== High schools ===
- Prairie View High School
- Brighton High School

=== Middle schools ===
- Prairie View Middle School
- Otho E. Stuart Middle School

=== Elementary schools ===
- Landmark Academy Charter School
- Turnberry Elementary School
- Reunion Elementary School
- Southlawn Elementary School
