= Cannabis in Colorado =

Colorado's Cannabis Universal Symbol

In Colorado, cannabis has been legal for medical use since 2000 and for recreational use since late 2012. On November 7, 2000, 54% of Colorado voters approved Amendment 20, which amended the State Constitution to allow the use of marijuana in the state for approved patients with written medical consent. Under this law, patients may possess up to 2 ounces (57 g) of medical marijuana and may cultivate no more than six marijuana plants (no more than three of these mature flowering plants at a time). Patients who were caught with more than this in their possession could argue "affirmative defense of medical necessity" but were not protected under state law with the rights of those who stayed within the guidelines set forth by the state. The Colorado Amendment 64, which was passed by voters on November 6, 2012, led to recreational legalization in December 2012 and state-licensed retail sales in January 2014. The policy has led to cannabis tourism. There are two sets of policies in Colorado relating to cannabis use: those for medicinal cannabis and for recreational drug use along with a third set of rules governing hemp.

== History ==
=== Prohibition (1917) (1929) and (1937) ===
Amidst an early 20th century trend of limiting the drug, Colorado first restricted cannabis on March 30, 1917. This made the use and cultivation of cannabis a misdemeanor, which was subject to a fine of between $10 and $100 (equivalent to $300 and $2,500 in 2025) and up to a month in jail. In 1929, the Colorado Legislature passed a law making the second offense of sale, possession and distribution of marijuana a felony by one to five years in prison.

Shortly after the 1937 Marihuana Tax Act went into effect on October 1, 1937, the Federal Bureau of Narcotics and Denver Police Department arrested Moses Baca for possession and Samuel Caldwell for dealing. Baca and Caldwell's arrest made them the first marijuana convictions under U.S. federal law for not paying the marijuana tax. Judge Foster Symes sentenced Baca to 18 months and Caldwell to four years in Leavenworth Penitentiary for violating the 1937 Marihuana Tax Act.

=== Decriminalization (1975) ===
In 1975, during a short-lived wave of decriminalization in the country, Colorado decriminalized possession of cannabis of up to one ounce (28 g), which was made a petty offense with a maximum fine of $100 (equivalent to $598 in 2025). That amount was increased to two ounces (57 g) in 2010, still with a maximum fine of $100 (equivalent to $148 in 2025).

A contributing factor in the favor of decriminalization was the work on behalf of NORML by Pitkin County Deputy District Attorney Jay Moore, who helped win over the legislature's Republican leadership with arguments as to money wasted on needless enforcement of marijuana laws.

=== Medical marijuana (2000) ===
On November 7, 2000, 54% of Colorado voters approved Amendment 20, which amended the State Constitution to allow the use of marijuana in the state for approved patients with written medical consent. Under this law, patients may possess up to 2 ounces (57 g) of medical marijuana and may cultivate no more than six marijuana plants (no more than three of these mature flowering plants at a time). Patients who are caught with more than this in their possession may argue "affirmative defense of medical necessity" but are not protected under state law with the rights of those who stay within the guidelines set forth by the state. Furthermore, doctors, when making a patient recommendation to the state can recommend the rights to possess additional medicine and grow additional plants, because of the patient's specific medical needs. Conditions recognized for medical marijuana in Colorado include: cachexia; cancer; chronic pain; chronic nervous system disorders; epilepsy and other disorders characterized by seizures; glaucoma; HIV or AIDS; multiple sclerosis and other disorders characterized by muscle spasticity; and nausea. Additionally, patients may not use medical marijuana in public places or in any place where they are in plain view, or in any manner which may endanger others (this includes operating a vehicle or machinery after medicating). Colorado medical marijuana patients cannot fill prescriptions at a pharmacy because under federal law, marijuana is classified as a schedule I drug. Instead, patients may get medicine from a recognized caregiver or a non-state-affiliated club or organization, usually called a dispensary. Dispensaries in Colorado offer a range of marijuana strains with different qualities, as well as various "edibles" or food products that contain marijuana extracts. Certain dispensaries also offer patients seeds and "clones" for those who want to grow their own medicine.

In April 2013, the Colorado Court of Appeals held in Coats v. Dish Network that since marijuana remains against federal law, employers can use that standard rather than state law as a rationale for banning off-the-job worker use, and are not bound by Colorado's Lawful Activities Statute:

The primary question before us is whether federally prohibited but state-licensed medical marijuana use is "lawful activity" under section 24-34-402.5, C.R.S. 2012, Colorado's Lawful Activities Statute. If it is, employers in Colorado would be effectively prohibited from discharging an employee for off-the-job use of medical marijuana, regardless of the fact that such use was in violation of federal law.

On June 10, 2016, Governor John Hickenlooper signed House Bill 16–1359. This bill stated that the court shall not prohibit the use or possession of medical marijuana as a condition of probation unless the individual is sentenced to probation for a conviction under Article 43.3 of Title 12, C.R.S.; or if the court determines based upon any material evidence that such a prohibition is necessary and appropriate to accomplish the goals of sentencing stated in 18-1-102.5, C.R.S.

=== Recreational marijuana (2012) ===
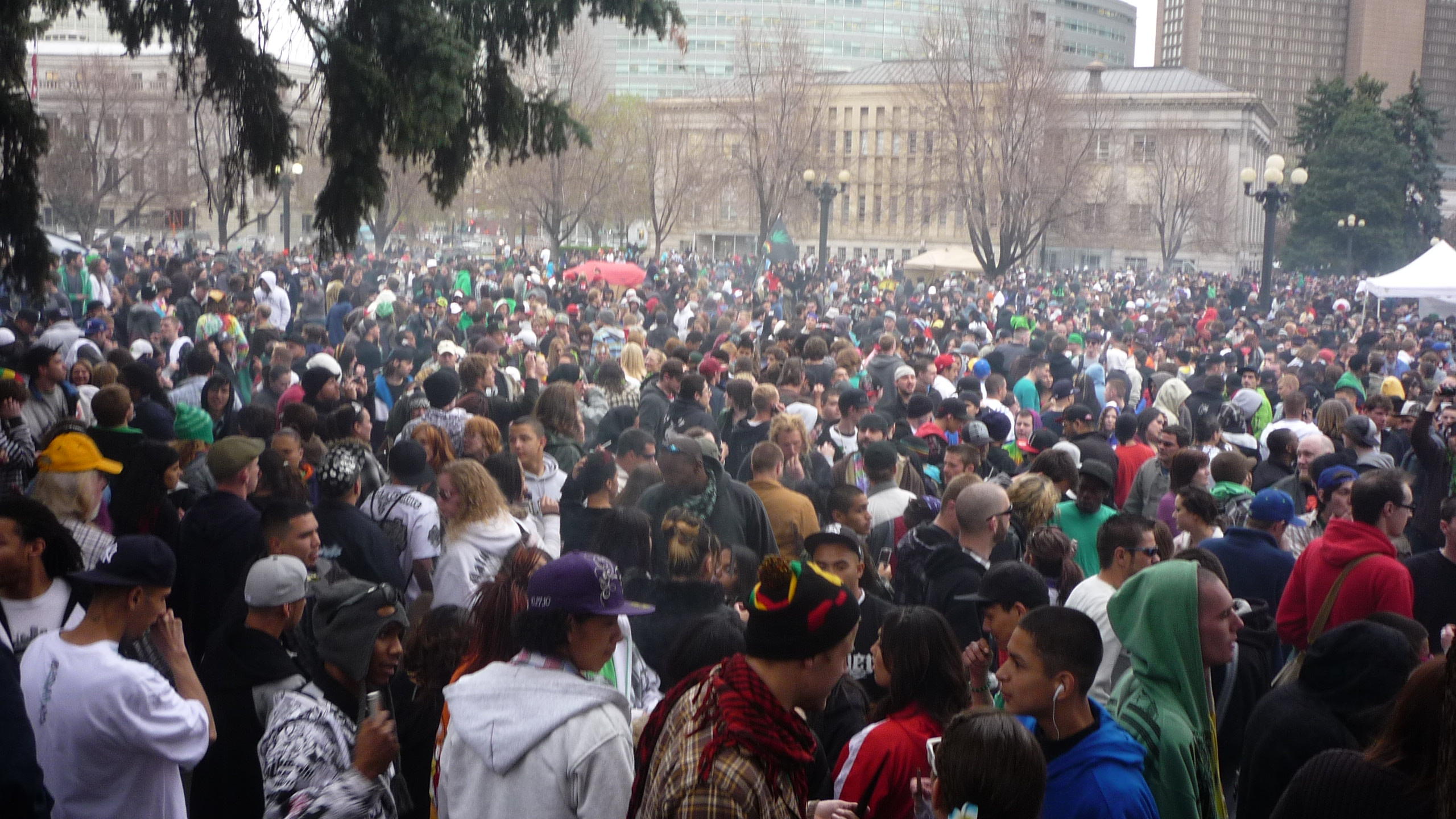
4:20 rally Denver, CO (2011)

Since the enactment of Colorado Amendment 64 in November 2012, adults aged 21 or older can grow up to six marijuana plants (with no more than half being mature flowering plants) privately in a locked space, legally possess all marijuana from the plants they grow (as long as it stays where it was grown), legally possess up to one ounce (28 g) of marijuana while traveling, and give as a gift up to one ounce (28 g) to other citizens 21 years of age or older.

Any adult in Colorado's territory may possess up to one ounce (28 g) of marijuana at any time, regardless of whether they are an in-state resident or an out-of-state visitor, as of 2016. Retail concentrate/edible limits are as follows: 8 grams (1/4 oz) of retail concentrate will be equal to 1 ounce (28 g) of flower, and therefore 800 mg of THC in the form of retail edibles will be equal to 1oz of retail flower. Consumption is permitted in a manner similar to alcohol, with equivalent offenses prescribed for driving. Consumption in public was recently passed in Denver under Ordinance 300 with a vote of 53% for legal public consumption, and a 46% vote against. Within 60 days the new rules will be written and should be similar to current public alcohol consumption rules and regulations. Amendment 64 also provides for licensing of cultivation facilities, product manufacturing facilities, testing facilities, and retail stores. Visitors and tourists in Colorado can purchase marijuana and use it in the state. Denver airport has banned all possession of marijuana but admits it has not charged a single person with possession nor has the airport seized any marijuana since the ban went into effect.

News report from Voice of America about the business of cannabis in Colorado - published March 20, 2015

Governor Hickenlooper signed several bills into law on May 28, 2013, implementing the recommendations of the Task Force on the Implementation of Amendment 64. On September 9, 2013, the Colorado Department of Revenue adopted final regulations for recreational marijuana establishments, implementing the Colorado Retail Marijuana Code (HB 13–1317). On September 16, 2013, the Denver City Council adopted an ordinance for retail marijuana establishments. The state prepared for an influx of tourists with extra police officers posted in Denver. Safety fears led to officials seeking to limit use of the drug in popular ski resorts. According to a Quinnipiac University poll released July 21, 2014, Coloradans continued to support the state's legalization of marijuana for recreational use by a margin of 54–43 percent. At the same time, the poll indicated 66 percent of voters there think marijuana use should be legal in private homes and in members-only clubs, but should not be legal in bars, clubs or entertainment venues where alcohol is served. Sixty-one percent of respondents also said laws regulating marijuana use should be as strict as laws regulating alcohol use.

During 2014, the first year of implementation of Colorado Amendment 64, Colorado's legal marijuana market (both medical and recreational) reached total sales of $700 million. In September 2014, legislation was submitted by Alabama senator Jeff Sessions to ensure that Electronic Benefit Transfer cards could not be used to purchase marijuana, as the United States Department of Health and Human Services stated that their usage in marijuana shops was not prohibited.

By April 2018, revenue from legalized marijuana only amounted to 2% of the state's education budget, with some calling it "a drop in a bucket." During this month, sales records showed that marijuana sales were flat and were about the same as they were the previous year.

In mid-2019, Governor Jared Polis signed a law that would allow licensed businesses to have social marijuana use areas.

=== Hemp in Colorado ===
Industrial hemp became legal in Colorado following the passage of Amendment 64 in 2012, which directed the General Assembly to establish laws governing hemp cultivation, processing, and sale.

In 2013, the legislature adopted Senate Bill 13-241, creating an Industrial Hemp Program under the Colorado Department of Agriculture, and in 2014 it enacted Senate Bill 14-184, defining industrial hemp (≤0.3% delta-9 THC) and establishing licensing and seed certification rules.

That same year, Colorado farmer Ryan Loflin planted about 60 acres of hemp near Springfield in Baca County, becoming the first modern U.S. farmer to harvest an industrial hemp crop after decades of prohibition.

Industry and advocacy organizations soon formed to support hemp’s development. The Rocky Mountain Hemp Association, founded in 2013, helped advise regulators and farmers. In 2014, entrepreneur Morris Beegle launched the NoCo Hemp Expo in northern Colorado, which grew into one of the world’s largest annual hemp trade shows and helped connect Colorado producers with national and international markets.

Colorado also became internationally recognized for pioneering CBD-rich hemp varieties. In 2011, the Stanley brothers developed a low-THC, high-CBD cultivar that became known as Charlotte’s Web. It was named after Charlotte Figi, a Colorado child whose severe epilepsy was dramatically reduced by CBD oil derived from the plant. Charlotte’s story brought national and global attention to hemp-derived CBD and helped catalyze widespread policy reforms.

Jared Polis, first as a U.S. Representative and later as Governor, became a leading political champion of industrial hemp. His administration created the Colorado Hemp Management Plan (CHAMP) to align state rules with the 2018 U.S. Farm Bill. In 2021 the U.S. Department of Agriculture approved Colorado’s hemp plan, securing federal compliance for the program.

== Regulation ==
General regulations for the legal commercial production and vending of marijuana in the state, which continue to be updated by the General Assembly, are published through the Marijuana Enforcement Division of the Department of Revenue. In July 2021, the Governor of Colorado established the Colorado Cannabis Business Office.

Hemp is defined as any form of the cannabis plant which has less than "3/10's of one percent" delta-9-THC. The state department of agriculture regulates hemp production. Colorado was one of the first states to legalize marijuana which means they were very careful when outlining how they would regulate it. There are multiple forms of marijuana such as smoking the plant, concentrates and edible making it difficult for Colorado to regulate. The Governors' office worked and is still working hand in hand with individuals involved in law enforcement, public and environmental health, human services, and education to find solutions. Marijuana causes impaired judgment and lack of coordination making it unsafe to drive at certain levels. This is problematic due to the rest of the population being at risk on the roads. Colorado has created legislation that states it is unlawful for one to operate a vehicle when intoxicated at a blood THC level of 5 nanograms/milliliter or more. Colorado put in place legislation stating that only persons 21 and older can possess one ounce (28 g) of weed or less on hand. In May 2021 the lawful possession limit for adults was doubled to two ounces (57 g) per person.

=== Impaired driving ===
Like other states, driving while impaired by any drug is illegal in Colorado, though it took the legislature six attempts and three years to pass marijuana intoxication measures. Ultimately the legislators decided on a nanogram limit in the bloodstream, though the number they picked was scoffed at by activists. Today Colorado law states that juries may convict a person of marijuana intoxication if they have five or more nanograms of THC per milliliter of blood, but defendants are allowed to argue that they were not intoxicated despite having such levels of THC in their bloodstream.

==== Testing limitations ====
Since the legalization of recreational Marijuana in the state of Colorado testing an individual's level of intoxication has proven to be a challenge. “There is no one blood or oral fluid concentration that can differentiate impaired and not impaired,” (Berger, 2018).

== Results ==
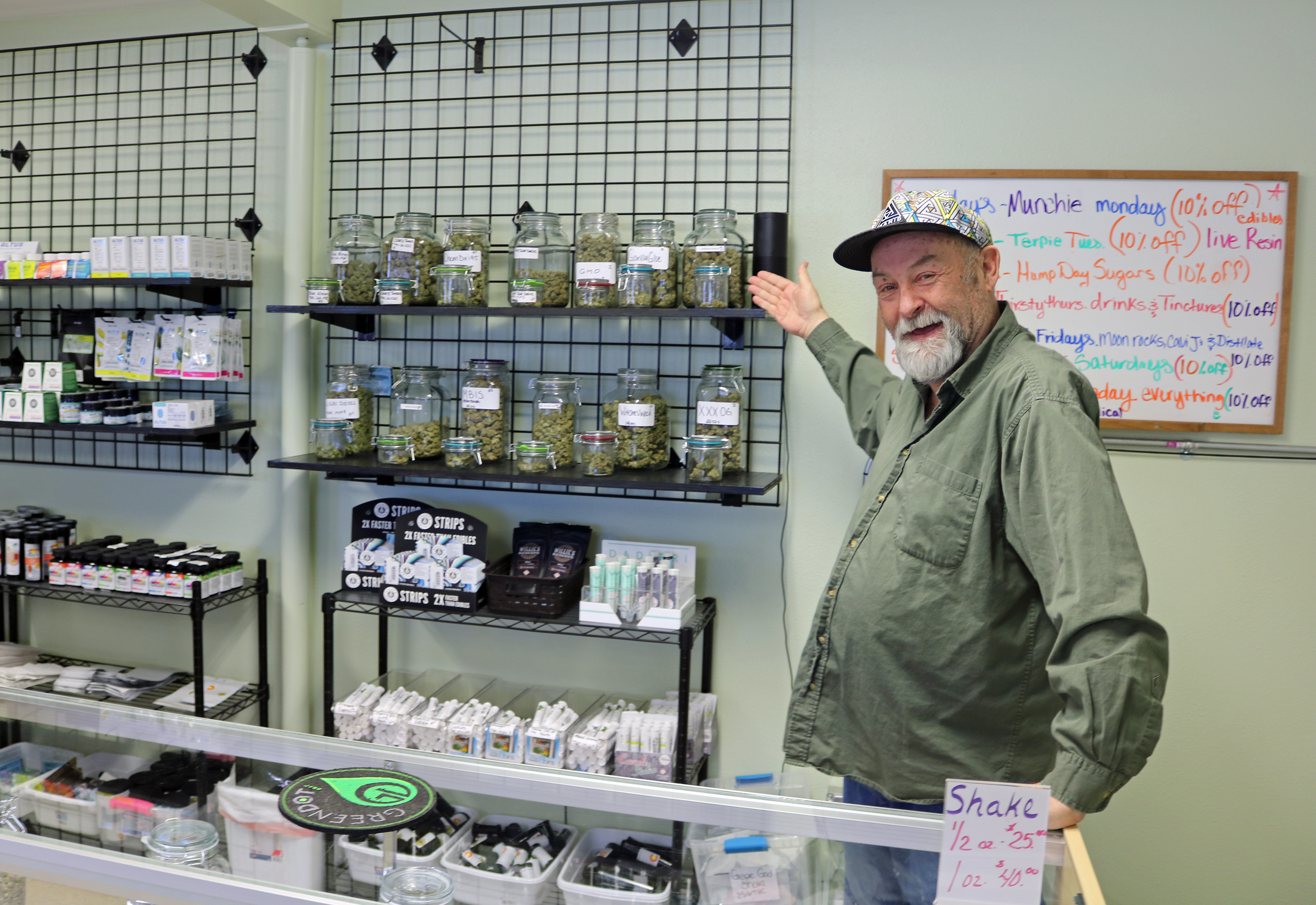
The interior of a cannabis shop in Walsenburg, Colorado

The Colorado amendment 64, which was passed by voters on November 6, 2012, led to legalization in January 2014.

The annual number of teenager (13 to 21 years old) visits to emergency rooms involving a cannabis related diagnostic code or positive for marijuana from a urine drug screen more than quadrupled during the decade (2005-2014) leading to the legalization. Two thirds of these cases involving marijuana were about mental health problems, and more than half of these cases also tested positive for other drugs.

A national survey conducted between 2014 and 2016 alleged that adolescent abuse of marijuana has fallen to the lowest level it has been in years after legalization. This has been attributed to both additional funding raised from taxation and law enforcement's increasing involvement in the oversight of production and sales.

The biannual Healthy Kids Colorado Survey provides data on marijuana usage and attitudes among public middle or high schools students. According to the 2015 survey, Colorado's youth marijuana use rate dipped slightly in 2015 and was lower than the national average. The percentage of teenagers who have "used marijuana one or more times during the past 30 days" had dropped to 21% in 2015, down from 25% in 2009. The 2019 survey showed that the percentage of students who had "used marijuana one or more times during the past 30 days" stayed stable, between 19.4 and 21.2 percent, from 2013 until 2019, and there was no clear trend.

In 2014, Colorado invested $2 million generated from marijuana sales tax revenue on campaigns aimed at anti-marijuana education of minors and the state has plans to spend double that amount, $4 million in 2015 (out of a total projected marijuana sales tax revenue of $125 million). The current campaigns provide information on marijuana laws, the impacts of youth use, the dangers of driving under the influence of any drug, and the harmful side effects of using marijuana.

In 2017, the government of Colorado collected over $247 million in taxes, fees, and licensing costs.

By 2018, there was $905 million in total recreational cannabis sales since the legalization in 2014.

== See also ==
- Colorado Amendment 44 (2006)
- Colorado Amendment 64 (2012)
- Law of Colorado
- Cannabis Law Reform
- Prohibition of drugs
- Washington Initiative 502
- Colorado Badged Network
