= 2012 Colorado Amendment 64 =

Referendum legalizing marijuana

Amendment 64
- November 6, 2012
- Use and Regulation of Marijuana

Results
Choice	Votes	%
Yes	1,383,140	55.32%
No	1,116,894	44.68%
Valid votes	2,500,034	96.72%
Invalid or blank votes	84,685	3.28%
Total votes	2,584,719	100.00%
Registered voters/turnout	3,648,008	70.85%
County results
For
50%-60%
60%-70%
70%-80%
Against
50%-60%
60%-70%
- Election was held: November 6, 2012

Colorado Amendment 64 was a successful popular initiative ballot measure to amend the Constitution of the State of Colorado, outlining a statewide drug policy for cannabis. The measure passed on November 6, 2012, and along with a similar measure in Washington state, marked "an electoral first not only for America but for the world."

Enacted as Article 18, section 16 of the state constitution, the law addresses "personal use and regulation of marijuana" for adults 21 and over, as well as commercial cultivation, manufacture, and sale: regulating marijuana in a manner similar to alcohol, namely for recreational use. Possession and cultivation of marijuana became legal on December 10, 2012, after governor John Hickenlooper issued an executive action adding Amendment 64 to the state constitution. The commercial sale of marijuana to the general public began on January 1, 2014, at establishments licensed under the regulatory framework.

There are local opt-out provisions so the sale and use of marijuana continues to be subject to restrictions in many jurisdictions. As of April 2017, 176 of Colorado's 272 municipalities had opted to prohibit retail marijuana activity within their boundaries.As of January 2025, there continued to be a patchwork of local and county restrictions.

== Ballot summary ==
Proposed initiative 2011/12 #30 was submitted on January 4 and found sufficient by the Secretary of State on February 27 to appear on the general ballot for the November election.

=== Personal use ===
Adults 21 or older can grow up to three immature and three mature marijuana plants privately in a locked space, legally possess all marijuana from the plants they grow (as long as it stays where it was grown), legally possess up to one ounce of marijuana while traveling, and give as a gift up to one ounce to other citizens 21 years of age or older. Consumption is permitted in a manner similar to alcohol, with equivalent offenses prescribed for driving under the influence.

The new legislation does not apply to medical marijuana.

=== Commercial regulation ===
The legislation defines industrial hemp as any part of the cannabis plant, growing or not, "with a delta-9-tetrahydrocannabinol (THC) concentration that does not exceed three tenths percent (0.3%) on a dry weight basis." The amendment declares that industrial hemp should be regulated separately from marijuana with higher THC concentrations, and requires the Colorado General Assembly to "enact legislation governing the cultivation, processing, and sale of industrial hemp" by no later than July 1, 2014.

The amendment provides for licensing of cultivation facilities, product manufacturing facilities, testing facilities, and retail stores. Local governments can now regulate or prohibit such facilities. This amendment requires the general assembly to enact an excise tax to be levied upon wholesale sales of marijuana, requiring that the first $40 million in revenue raised annually by such tax be credited to the public school capital construction assistance fund, known as the Building Excellent Schools today (B.E.S.T.) program. The B.E.S.T. program assists in renovation, repairs, and new school construction needs for Colorado public schools. B.E.S.T. receives funding from state land tax proceeds, lottery proceeds, interest tax proceeds, and marijuana sales tax proceeds via Amendment 64. The Colorado Department of Education annual B.E.S.T. reports suggest that Amendment 64 has provided a visible increase in funding to this program. Since implementation of Amendment 64, the Colorado B.E.S.T. program has seen a decrease in overall annual applications numbers, an increase in overall granted applications numbers, and an increase in cash granted amounts since implementation of Amendment 64 in 2014.

== Support and opposition ==
The largest survey for the amendment, conducted October 23, 2012 by Public Policy Polling, indicated that 53% of voters intended to support it, with 46% opposed. On December 9, 2013, more than a year after the passing of Amendment 64, a Public Policy Polling poll showed that the majority of Coloradans still support legal marijuana. With 53% support versus 38% opposition, the survey of 928 Colorado voters showed little change in support for legal marijuana a year on from the amendment vote.

Since the amendment passed there has been concern over its conflict with federal substance prohibition laws. The outcome is nevertheless expected to have broad impacts south of the border, including in Mexico where less than a week after the U.S. vote Mexican senators submitted a proposal to legalize marijuana in their country.

=== Support ===
Though support for liberalizing drug policy has traditionally been considered a liberal or libertarian cause, Amendment 64 garnered a number of high-profile conservative endorsements, including, most notably, an endorsement from former U.S. Representative and 2008 Republican Presidential Candidate Tom Tancredo, who claimed, "Throughout my career in public policy and in public office, I have fought to reform or eliminate wasteful and ineffective government programs. There is no government program or policy I can think of that has failed in such a unique way as marijuana prohibition." Similarly, Temple Emmanuel's Rabbi, Steven Foster, endorsed Amendment 64 because, "as clergy, we have the responsibility to talk about what policies serve our community best. You do not have to use marijuana—or even approve of marijuana—to see that our current laws are not working." Many supporters of Amendment 64 did so because they wanted to improve the efficiency and effectiveness of the state's law enforcement resources. Proponents believe that permitting recreational use will allow officers to focus on prevention of violent crime and that it will remove some of the burden on the state's prosecutors and courts.

Other justifications for support include: increasing the state's revenue (much of the additional revenue is required to be used to fund primary education), subjecting otherwise illicit substances to health and safety regulations for the protections of users, enhancing individual freedom, eliminating a black market (black markets tend to result in crime regardless of the goods sold because market participants are already criminals, and therefore have less to lose by committing additional crimes), and providing empirical evidence for studying the effects of legalization to identify whether the harms associated with drugs are actually caused by the policy of prohibition.

Yet another argument favoring Amendment 64 is that regulation of marijuana may actually reduce marijuana usage by teens: According to Regulate Marijuana Like Alcohol, the organization responsible for much of the campaigning in support of Amendment 64, marijuana use by teens is likely to go down because commercial access would be limited to persons 21 and older. The campaign also points out that teens who currently seek marijuana have to turn to criminals for their supply and that these criminals may expose teens to other, potentially more dangerous drugs like heroin, meth, or cocaine. Supporters also point out that Colorado's experience with medical marijuana supports their conclusion: The CDC's Youth Risk Behavior Surveillance System monitors a number of statistics for America's youth. The CDC study suggests that marijuana use among Colorado's youths fell by 2.8 percent from 2009 (24.8 percent) to 2011 (22 percent), while the national rate of youth use increased by 2.3 percent from 2009 (20.8 percent) to 2011 (23.1 percent). Furthermore, the CDC found that the availability of drugs on school grounds in Colorado fell 5 percent from 2009 (22.7 percent) to 2011 (17.2 percent), while the national rate increased by 3.1 percent over the same time.

=== Opposition ===
The group "No on 64" objected to Amendment 64 chiefly because it claimed the amendment would lead to increased use of marijuana, a consequence the group considers harmful. In particular, the group sees marijuana as addictive and as damaging to children because they believe it "permanently affects brain development, impairs learning ability and contributes to depression."

On October 14, The Denver Post's editorial board announced its opposition to Amendment 64. The board began by saying, "We believe possession and use of marijuana should be legal," but ultimately encouraged readers to vote against the amendments because "Drug policy simply has no business being in the state constitution."

== Implementation ==
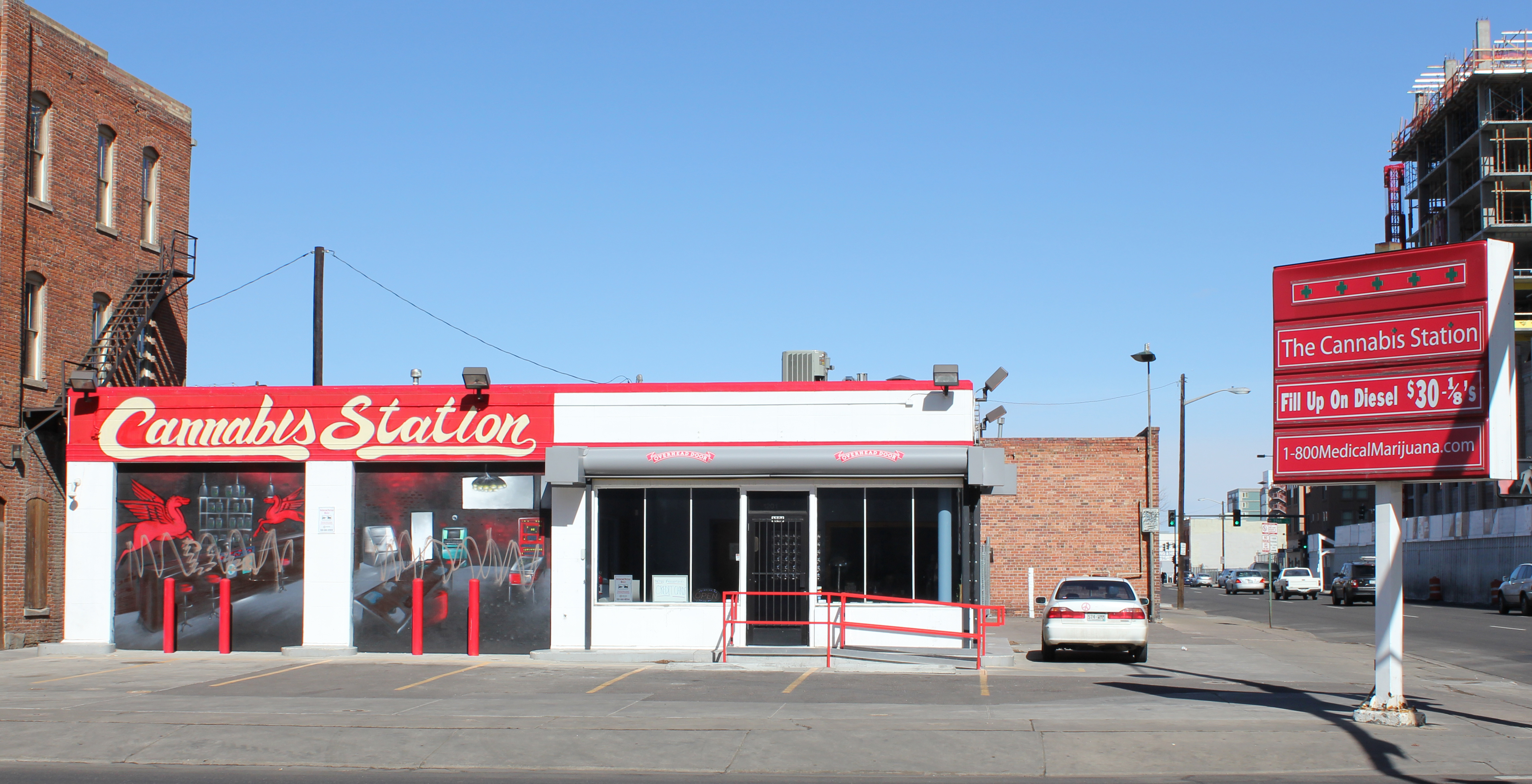
Cannabis dispensary in Denver, Colorado

The policies took effect when the Governor ratified the ballots, which was to happen within 30 days of the election. Governor John Hickenlooper officially added the law to the state's constitution on Monday December 10, 2012 making the private consumption of marijuana legal in Colorado. The first stores officially opened on January 1, 2014.

Shortly after its passing Colorado Gov. John Hickenlooper stated "This will be a complicated process, but we intend to follow through. That said, federal law still says marijuana is an illegal drug, so don't break out the Cheetos or Goldfish too quickly." On December 10, 2012 Governor Hickenlooper signed Executive Order B 2012-004 to create the Task Force on the Implementation of Amendment 64 to "consider and resolve a number of policy, legal and procedural issues". On March 13, 2013, the task force issued 58 recommendations on how recreational pot should be grown, sold and taxed in the state. On May 28, 2013, Governor Hickenlooper signed several bills into law implementing the task force's recommendations. On September 9, 2013, the Colorado Department of Revenue adopted final regulations for recreational marijuana establishments, implementing the Colorado Retail Marijuana Code (HB 13-1317). On September 16, 2013, the Denver City Council adopted an ordinance for retail marijuana establishments. These local licensing requirements are in addition to the state licensing requirements.

=== Proposition AA ===
On May 28, 2013 the government also proposed Proposition AA, a 15% excise tax on the "average market rate" and a 10-15% sales tax on retail sales (on top of the 2.9% state sales tax and any local government sales taxes). The Colorado chapter of NORML opposed the measure, supporting the 15% excise tax but opposing the 10% sales tax as unreasonable and unnecessary, arguing that the proposed marijuana taxes could amount to an effective tax rate of 30-40% and would be more than twice the equivalent taxes on alcohol, that there would be adequate funds to effectively regulate recreational marijuana if the measure failed, and that excessive taxation would have the potential effect of keeping a black market alive. The Denver Post disagreed, citing the insufficiency of licensing fees to previously regulate medical marijuana and rejecting the notion that the taxes would drive pot back to the black market. On November 5, Proposition AA was approved by a wide margin, as were similar local taxes such as a 3.5% Denver marijuana sales tax which is on top of the 3.62% Denver sales tax.

== "Local Option" legal challenge ==
Although Colorado voters approved the constitutional amendment legalizing retail sales of marijuana for recreational purposes, the amendment and enabling legislation also provided that localities could limit or ban retail outlets within a city or unincorporated portion of a county through a "local option". The provisions of Amendment 64 concerning personal use are not affected by the local bans on retail sales, so that growing and possession of small quantities of "personal" pot are legal statewide under state (but not federal) law. Most localities have chosen to ban retail stores, at least temporarily.

A locality may prohibit the operation of marijuana cultivation facilities, marijuana product manufacturing facilities, marijuana testing facilities, or retail marijuana stores through the enactment of an ordinance or through an initiated or referred measure; provided, any initiated or referred measure to prohibit the operation of marijuana cultivation facilities, marijuana product manufacturing facilities, marijuana testing facilities, or retail marijuana stores must appear on a general election ballot during an even numbered year.

— Amendment 64

=== Colorado Springs and vicinity ===
Colorado Springs is the county seat of El Paso county, the second most populous county in the state. A tiny majority of El Paso county voters approved the statewide Amendment 64 with an original margin of only 10 votes. In Colorado Springs the measure won by just 2% favored by only 5,000 out of more than 200,000 ballots cast. Relying on the local option clause in the amendment, the city council then voted 5-4 not to permit retail shops in the city. Some council members expressed concern over the effect pot shops would have on existing businesses, as well as on local military bases. Current mayor John Suthers, elected in May 2015, supports the ban on pot shops; his opponent in the mayoral election supported recreational pot shops as a way to increase city tax collections. Suthers, a former Colorado Attorney General, has long been an outspoken opponent of legalized marijuana.

Retail marijuana outlets are also banned in unincorporated areas of El Paso County. As of 2016, the only area in El Paso County to permit retail recreational marijuana outlets is the city of Manitou Springs, which adjoins Colorado Springs to the west, and has two retail recreational pot shops, the maximum number allowed by city ordinance.

Medical marijuana outlets continue to operate in Colorado Springs although current regulations prevent any new stores from opening. As of 2015, there were 91 medical marijuana clinics in the city, which reported sales of $59.6 million in 2014, up 11 percent from the previous year.

=== Pueblo county ===
In Pueblo County in 2013 the commissioners adopted laws governing the recreational marijuana industry. The laws allows for the establishment of recreational marijuana grows, manufacturing, testing and retail facilities. The county currently limits the industry to 15 retail marijuana stores which produced more than one half million dollars in taxes in their first year. In 2014 the citizens adopted a tax measure designed to fund college scholarships. In April 2016 a citizen group, operating under Amendment 64's local option, is threatening to bring the issue to ballot with the potential outcome that if adopted the established industry would be forced to shut down anywhere it operates within the unincorporated county. County Commissioner Sal Pace said if this ban were to pass it would hurt the county. In 2015 the county generated a net revenue of $1.75 million from recreational marijuana sales.

== Tax revenue ==
In February 2015, the state of Colorado reported that tax collection figures for 2014, the first year of legal commercial sales, reached a total of $44 million from recreational marijuana with a further $32 million collected from fees on the industry and pre-existing taxes on medical marijuana. The projected revenue before legalization was $60 million. These sales and excise tax figures do not include the corporate and personal income taxes generated by businesses and employees working in the state's marijuana industry. The state Department of Revenue reported that official sales of recreational and medical marijuana from dispensaries reached over $996 million in 2015; a $297 million increase from the $699 million sold in 2014. The 2015 sales alone generated $135 million of tax revenue, $35 million of which are being used for the Education Center construction projects.

== Results ==
Colorado has experienced significant financial benefit as a result of legalization, with marijuana tax, license and fee revenue surpassing $1 billion as of 2019. This revenue has been used to finance youth, education and health programs; the first $40 million of annual fee revenue is used to repair and upgrade local elementary schools and education facilities.

Colorado has seen an 8% rise in homelessness since legalization, which has fueled speculation as to whether increased marijuana use is partially to blame; however, this rise is likely attributed to migration into the state as a result of legalization, including those who were already homeless. The number of teenagers sent to emergency rooms with THC-positive substance screens more than quadrupled after marijuana was legalized. The state also saw a 3% increase in car collision claims after legalization.

== Interstate lawsuit ==
In 2015, Nebraska and Oklahoma attempted to file suit in federal court to stop the implementation of Amendment 64, claiming that Colorado cannabis was harming their localities, and should be preempted by federal law. Sheriffs in Kansas joined the suit. If their effort prevailed, it could have "potentially [led] to all state-level legalization laws being struck down". The United States Solicitor General filed an amicus brief urging the bill of complaint not to be heard, in layman's terms "urging the court to stay out of the case". On March 21, 2016, the United States Supreme Court denied Nebraska and Oklahoma's motion, leaving Amendment 64 and other states' legalization laws in effect.

== See also ==
- Decriminalization of non-medical cannabis in the United States
- Legal history of cannabis in the United States
- Legal issues of cannabis
- List of Colorado ballot measures
- Civil liberties
- Prohibition of drugs
- Washington Initiative 502
