= Colorado Liquor Enforcement Division =

American government agency

Agency overview
- Type: Alcoholic beverage authority
- Jurisdiction: State of Colorado
- Parent agency: Colorado Department of Revenue Enforcement Unit
- Website: Colorado Liquor Enforcement Division

The Colorado Liquor Enforcement Division (or Division of Liquor/Tobacco Enforcement) is a division of the Colorado Department of Revenue, an agency charged with the regulation of alcoholic beverages within the state of Colorado. The department was established in 1989 by Colorado Revised Statutes 24-35-401. In 2018, the department was reestablished by C.R.S. 44-6-101, after the first law was repealed.

== Organization ==
The Department currently has three offices:

- Lakewood, responsible for Northern Colorado
- Colorado Springs, responsible for Southern Colorado
- Grand Junction, responsible for Eastern Colorado

== See also ==
- State of Colorado
