= Colorado Badged Network =

Online networking organization

Colorado Badged Network (CBN)
- Founded: 2015
- Founder: Joe Webb, Phil Maccarone, Hayley Witherell
- Type: Online networking organization
- Purpose: Connecting the Colorado cannabis industry
- Region served: Colorado, United States
- Members: 6,100+
- Website: coloradobadgednetwork.com

Colorado Badged Network (CBN) is an online networking organization dedicated to connecting professionals in the Colorado cannabis industry. Open exclusively to individuals with a valid occupational license (commonly referred to as a "badge"), the network provides resources to support professional growth and fosters a welcoming environment for all members, with particular attention to marginalized groups.

== Purpose ==
CBN connects Colorado cannabis professionals by offering job opportunities, compliance updates, legal advice, and access to industry events. It is frequently described as the "water cooler" of the industry, facilitating discussions about best practices, tools, workplace challenges, and other shared experiences. The organization prioritizes diversity and strives to create a welcoming environment for underrepresented groups.

== History ==
CBN was founded in 2015 as "Colorado Badged Jobs" by Joe Webb to help recruit employees for his cannabis cultivation warehouse. Co-founders Phil Maccarone and Hayley Witherell joined soon after, helping expand its focus beyond job recruitment. The organization evolved to include discussions on compliance, workplace tips, product recommendations, and general industry support.

In 2017, the group rebranded as "Colorado Badged Network" to reflect its mission. By June 2018, CBN had over 5,000 members, growing to more than 6,100 members by November of the same year. The group was known for its high activity, with up to 40 daily posts, and continues to attract cannabis professionals across the state.

== Environment ==
CBN is recognized for its collaborative and supportive atmosphere, fostering mutual respect and understanding, and providing both workers and owners with the space and belief to voice their perspectives. The organization has been specifically praised for its inclusive environment supporting LGBTQ professionals, Black-owned businesses, and individuals with disabilities within the cannabis industry. By prioritizing diversity, CBN seeks to provide opportunities for all groups to connect and engage within the broader industry.

While widely endorsed in local media, some badge holders have expressed concerns about privacy, as CBN verifies badge information using publicly available data from the Colorado Department of Revenue. Witherell has addressed these concerns, clarifying that only public information is used to grant network access.

== See also ==
- National Cannabis Industry Association – American organization representing cannabis-related businesses
- Colorado Department of Revenue – Government agency
- Cannabis product testing – Testing of the properties of cannabis destined for consumer use
- Budtender – Staff member in a cannabis dispensary
