= Colorado Cooperative Act =

The Colorado Cooperative Act (officially Article 56 of Title 7, Colorado Revised Statutes) is a Colorado statute governing the chartering of cooperatives in the state. The law governs the chartering and operation of worker, consumer and producer cooperatives as well as operations of foreign counterparts in-state.

== History ==
In 1913, the Co-operative Association Act was passed to assist the establishment of utility cooperatives, and was amended in 1915 to further define cooperative powers and legally limit use of the word "cooperative" as a business name outside of chartered cooperatives. In 1923, due to pressure from the Colorado League, a branch of the North Dakota-founded Nonpartisan League, the Colorado Legislature passed the Cooperative Marketing Act, which allowed farmers to form their own coop stores, warehouses and other facilities to provide direct sales to retail buyers. The law allowed for the creation of several producer cooperatives over the decades in Colorado.

In 1996, all cooperative-related legislation was repealed in favor of a unified Colorado Cooperative Act.

== Related legislation ==
=== Uniform Limited Cooperative Association Act ===
The Uniform Limited Cooperative Association Act (ULCAA, formally Article 58 of Title 7, CRS) was signed into law as SB 11-191 on May 23, 2011 by Governor John Hickenlooper and came into effect on April 2, 2012, legalizing the chartering of limited cooperative associations. The law adopted portions of the Cooperative Act with adaptations of the model ULCAA which was drafted by the Uniform Law Commission in 2007.

=== Public Benefit Corporation Act ===
The Public Benefit Corporation Act (PBCA, H.B. 13-1138, Title 7, Article 101, Part 5, CRS) was signed into law by Hickenlooper on May 15, 2013, legalizing the dual chartering of for-profit corporations and limited liability companies as public benefit corporations. In addition, the law allowed for cooperatives and limited cooperative associations to adopt public benefit purposes into their charters under the Act.

== Impact ==
The terms of the Cooperative Act and the ULCAA are considered more permissive and expansive for cooperatives and employee-owned businesses compared to other U.S. states. In 2019, Governor Jared Polis established the Colorado Employee Ownership Commission within the Colorado Office of Economic Development and International Trade (OEDIT). In 2020, the OEDIT established the Colorado Employee Ownership Office to implement the commission's recommendations.

== See also ==
- Delaware General Corporation Law
