= Thorium diselenide =

Identifiers
CAS Number	60763-24-8
3D model (JSmol)	Interactive image
ChemSpider	34998729
ECHA InfoCard	100.056.718
EC Number	262-410-8
PubChem CID	101870611
- InChI: InChI=1S/2Se.Th Key: CDRIOKBKMKFSNO-UHFFFAOYSA-N
- SMILES: [Se].[Se].[Th]

Properties
Chemical formula	Se_{2}Th
Molar mass	389.980 g·mol^{−1}
Appearance	dark purple-grey
Density	8.4 g/cm^{3}
Melting point	decomposes
- Except where otherwise noted, data are given for materials in their standard state (at 25 °C [77 °F], 100 kPa). Infobox references

Thorium diselenide is an inorganic compound with the chemical formula ThSe_{2}. It is one of the selenides of thorium. It was first obtained in 1896 through the reaction of thorium carbide and selenium vapour.

== Preparation ==
Thorium diselenide can be prepared by the high-temperature reaction of thorium and selenium:

Th + 2 Se → ThSe_{2}

It can also be obtained by the thermal decomposition of phenylselenol thorium pyridine compound.
