= Water Rights Determination and Administration Act (Colorado) =

Colorado water law act

Water Rights Determination and Administration Act (Colorado) was passed by the Colorado General Assembly in 1969 which constituted a major makeover of the way the state applied and enforced its evolving water law. The first two legislative acts creating a basis for Colorado water law were passed in 1879 and 1881. The position of State Engineer was created to record and maintain records of water-rights priority from irrigator filings; it called for a water commissioner in each of the arbitrary water districts (sometimes geographically incoherent); and made the district court the adjudicator of all water rights and judge in conflicts. These acts were foundational and had been modified in 1891, 1899 and 1903 as other domestic uses joined agriculture in the adjudication system. In 1919 all water rights were required to be adjudicated. Due to inconsistencies and complaints in the 1960s, state legislative council appointed a water committee to travel the state to determine what was required to fix the major insufficiencies.

The state had over 70 water districts handling filings. The same stream had several water districts appropriating priorities without knowledge of what the others were doing. Another problem occurred with the growing awareness of the relationship between ground water and surface water.

The issue of federal reserved rights on public lands under the Winters Doctrine put junior water rights appropriations to these hidden rights in an unjust situation when and if those hidden rights were put to use and filed on.

The results of this water committee traveling the state were compiled, and the creation of the Water Rights Determination and Administration Act produced the following:

- Organized the state's water districts into seven divisions based on watersheds, with water courts in district and division engineers administering the water rights.
- The clerk of the water court was responsible for publishing a monthly resume of water-rights applications making the adjudication process continuous and transparent.
- Incorporated all tributary wells into the priority system.
- Required junior water users on over-appropriated streams to create augmentation plans to obtain sufficient replacement water from a reservoir with senior water or other options.
- Clarified and formulated a common set of procedures for all water-rights applications, changes of water rights, exchanges, augmentation plans, objections to applications.
- Established rulemaking and enforcement procedures for determining and administering federal reserved rights, tribal rights, and state appropriative rights.

The Supreme Court was petitioned by the federal government for a writ of certiorari to determine whether the new law was in compliance with the McCarran Amendment of 1952, which waived federal sovereign immunity in water issues and compelled the government to register its claims under each state's water-appropriation system. The act has been amended or added to many times since but continues to be sound foundation for determining and administering water rights.
