= Vehicle registration plates of Colorado =

Colorado
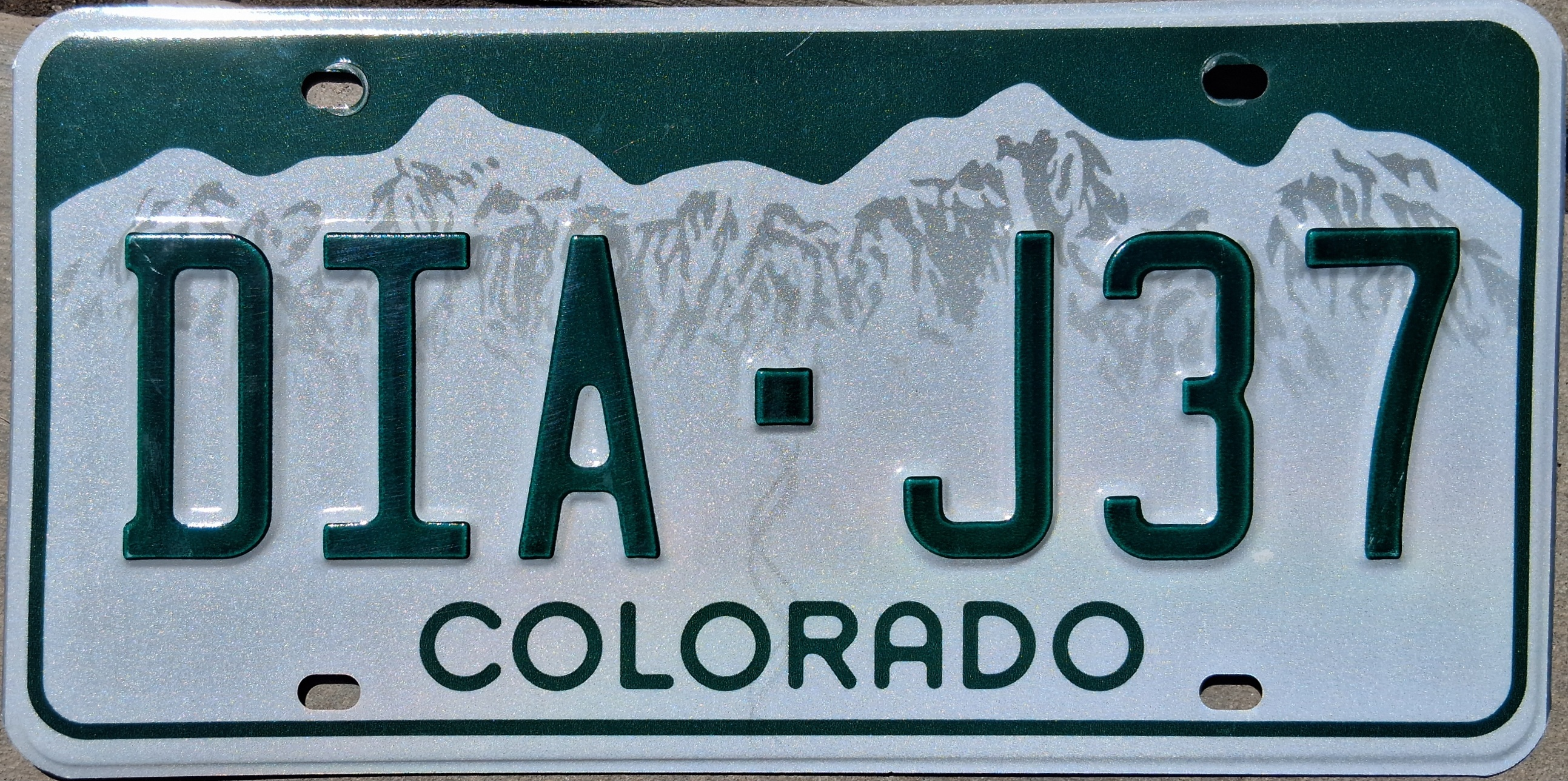

Current series
- Size: 12 in × 6 in 30 cm × 15 cm
- Material: Aluminum
- Serial format: ABC-D12 (2018-present); ABC-123 (2015-2018); 123-ABC (2000-2015)
- Introduced: January 2000

Availability
- Issued by: Colorado Department of Revenue, Division of Motor Vehicles

History
- First issued: July 15, 1913

The U.S. state of Colorado first required its residents to register their motor vehicles and display license plates in 1913. As of 2026, plates are issued by the Colorado Department of Revenue through its Division of Motor Vehicles. Front and rear plates are required for most classes of vehicles, while only rear plates are required for motorcycles and trailers.

The basic design of Colorado's license plate, a range of mountains against a white or green background, has been in use since 1960 (except for 1973 and 1975–76). In 2000, a screened, more detailed version of the mountain range replaced the previous dark green version.

== Passenger baseplates ==
=== 1913 to 1974 ===
In 1956, the United States, Canada, and Mexico came to an agreement with the American Association of Motor Vehicle Administrators, the Automobile Manufacturers Association and the National Safety Council that standardized the size for license plates for vehicles (except those for motorcycles) at 6 inches (15 cm) in height by 12 inches (30 cm) in width, with standardized mounting holes. The 1955 (dated 1956) issue was the first Colorado license plate that fully complied with these standards: the 1954 (dated 1955) issue was 6 inches in height by 12 inches in width, but had non-standard mounting holes.

Image	Dates issued	Design	Slogan	Serial format	Serials issued	Notes
	1913	Black serial on white porcelain plate; vertical "COLO" and "1913" at left and right respectively	none	12345	1 to approximately 14500	
	1914	White serial on dark blue porcelain plate; vertical "COLO" and "1914" at left and right respectively	none	12345	1 to approximately 20000	
	1915	Black serial on yellow porcelain plate; vertical "COLO" and "1915" at left and right respectively	none	12345	1 to approximately 29000	
	1916	Embossed white serial on brown plate with border line; vertical "COLO" and "1916" at left and right respectively	none	12345	1 to approximately 47000	First embossed plate. Serials issued in blocks by county; this practice continued through 1931.
	1917	Embossed black serial on pink plate with border line; vertical "COLO" and "1917" at left and right respectively	none	12345	1 to approximately 68000	
	1918	Embossed white serial on black plate with border line; vertical "COLO" and "1918" at left and right respectively	none	123-456	1 to approximately 102–000	
	1919–20	Welded silver serial on dark brown plate; "COLO." centered at top	none	123-456	1 to approximately 233–000	Validated for 1919 with dark brown tabs, and for 1920 with dark blue tabs.
	1920	Embossed silver serial on dark brown plate with border line; vertical "COLO" and "1920" at left and right respectively	none	123-456	1 to approximately 233–000	Issued only to new registrants.
	1921	Embossed silver serial on dark blue plate with border line; "COLO-1921" centered at top	none	123-456	1 to approximately 177–000	
	1922	Embossed black serial on white plate with border line; stylized vertical "COLO" and "22" at right	none	123-456	1 to approximately 190–000	
	1923	Embossed white serial on black plate with border line; "COLO. 1923" centered at bottom	none	123-456	1 to approximately 192–000	
	1924	Embossed black serial on beige plate with border line; "COLO. 1924" centered at bottom	none	123-456	1 to approximately 224–000	
	1925	Embossed white serial on maroon plate with border line; "COLO. 1925" centered at bottom	none	123-456	1 to approximately 266–000	
	1926	Embossed white serial on green plate with border line; "COLO. 1926" centered at bottom	none	123-456	1 to approximately 274–000	
	1927	Embossed white serial on black plate with border line; "COLO. 1927" centered at bottom	none	123-456	1 to approximately 308–000	
	1928	Embossed maroon serial on beige plate with border line; "COLO. 1928" centered at bottom	none	123-456	1 to approximately 314–000	
	1929	Embossed white serial on maroon plate with border line; "COLO. 1929" centered at bottom	none	123-456	1 to approximately 326–000	
	1930	Embossed orange serial on black plate with border line; "COLORADO-1930" at top	none	12-34-56	1 to approximately 34–40–00	First use of the full state name.
	1931	Embossed black serial on orange plate; "COLORADO-1931" at bottom	none	123-456	1 to approximately 386–000	
	1932	Embossed orange serial on black plate; "COLORADO 1932" at bottom	none	1-12-345; 10-1-234	County-coded	First use of county codes.
	1933	Embossed black serial on orange plate; "COLORADO 1933" at bottom	none	1-12345; 10-1234	County-coded	
	1934	Embossed yellow serial on black plate; "COLORADO 1934" at bottom	none	1-12345; 10-1234	County-coded	
	1935	Embossed black serial on yellow plate with border line; "COLO. 1935" centered at top	none	1-12345; 10-1234	County-coded	
	1936	Embossed white serial on blue plate with border line; "COLO. 1936" centered at top	none	1-12345; 10-1234	County-coded	
	1937	Embossed black serial on silver plate with border line; "COLO. 1937" centered at top	none	1-12345; 10-1234	County-coded	
	1938	Embossed white serial on turquoise plate with border line; "19 COLORADO 38" at top	none	1-12345; 10-1234	County-coded	
	1939	Embossed yellow serial on black plate with border line; "19 COLORADO 39" at top	none	1-12345; 10-12345	County-coded	
	1940	Embossed black serial on yellow plate with border line; "19 COLORADO 40" at top	none	1-12345; 10-12345	County-coded	
	1941	Embossed yellow serial on black plate with border line; "19 COLORADO 41" at top	none	1-123456; 10-12345	County-coded	
	1942	Embossed white serial on maroon plate with border line; "19 COLORADO 42" at top	none	1-123456; 10-12345	County-coded	
	1943–44	Embossed yellow serial on black plate with border line; "19 COLORADO 43" at top	none	1-123456; 10-12345	County-coded	Revalidated for 1944 with yellow tabs, due to metal conservation for World War II.
	1945	Embossed white serial on black plate with border line; "19 COLORADO 45" at top	none	1-12345; 10-12345	County-coded	
	1946	Embossed yellow serial on black plate with border line; "19 COLORADO 46" at bottom	none	1-12345; 10-12345	County-coded	
	1947	Embossed black serial on yellow plate with border line; "19 COLORADO 47" at bottom	none	1-123456; 10-12345	County-coded	
	1948	Embossed black serial on unpainted aluminum plate with border line; "19 COLORADO 48" at top	none	1-123456; 10-12345	County-coded	
	1949	Embossed yellow serial on black plate with border line; "19 COLORADO 49" at bottom	none	1-123456; 10-12345	County-coded	
	1950	Embossed green serial on white plate with border line; "19 COLORADO 50" at bottom	"COLORFUL" centered at top	1-123456; 10-12345	County-coded	
	1951–52	Embossed white serial on green plate with border line; "19 COLORADO 51" at bottom	"COLORFUL" centered at top	1-123456; 10-12345	County-coded	Revalidated for 1952 with yellow tabs, due to metal conservation for the Korean War.
	1953	Embossed green serial on yellow plate with border line; "19 COLORADO 53" at bottom	"COLORFUL" centered at top	1-123456; 10-12345	County-coded	
	1954	Embossed white serial on black plate with border line; "19 COLORADO 54" at bottom	"COLORFUL" centered at top	1-1234; A1-1234; 1A-1234; 10-1234; A10-123; 10A-123	County-coded	
	1955	Embossed black serial on white plate with border line; "COLORADO" at bottom, slightly offset to right; "55" at top right	"Colorful" at top, slightly offset to right	A/1 1234; A/10 1234	County-coded	
	1956	Embossed white serial on black plate with border line; "19 COLORADO 56" at bottom	none	A:1234	A:1 to Z:9999	Issued in Denver County.
	1956	Embossed white serial on black plate with border line; "19 COLORADO 56" at bottom	none	A/10 1234	County-coded	Issued in Arapahoe, Jefferson and Adams Counties.
	1956	Embossed white serial on black plate with border line; "19 COLORADO 56" at bottom	none	2:12345; 13:1234	County-coded	Issued in all other counties.
	1957	Embossed black serial on orange plate with border line; "19 COLORADO 57" at bottom	none	123-456	1001 to approximately 203–000	Issued in Denver County.
	1957	Embossed black serial on orange plate with border line; "19 COLORADO 57" at bottom	none	A/10 1234	County-coded	Issued in Arapahoe, Jefferson, Adams, Logan and Morgan Counties.
	1957	Embossed black serial on orange plate with border line; "19 COLORADO 57" at bottom	none	2-12345; 14-1234	County-coded	Issued in all other counties.
1958 Colorado license plate, Standard, Denver County	1958	Embossed green serial on pale green plate with border line; embossed skier graphic at right; "COLORADO 58" at bottom, offset to right	"Colorful" centered at top	A/B 123	A/A 1 to approximately N/R 999	Issued in Denver County.
	1958	Embossed green serial on pale green plate with border line; embossed skier graphic at right; "COLORADO 58" at bottom, offset to right	"Colorful" centered at top	2 123; 2/A 123; A/2 123; 1/0 123; 10/A 123; A/10 123	County-coded	Issued in all other counties.
	1959	Embossed white serial on green plate with border line; "19 COLORADO 59" at bottom	"Colorful" centered at top	AB-1234	County-coded	Letters I, O and Q not used in serials; this practice continued until the early 1990s.
	1960–61	Embossed green serial on white plate with border line; mountain range graphic at top; "19 COLORADO 60" at bottom	none	AB-1234	County-coded	Revalidated for 1961 with stickers.
	1962	Embossed white serial on green plate with border line; mountain range graphic at top; "19 COLORADO 62" at bottom	none	AB-1234	County-coded	
	1963	Embossed green serial on white plate with border line; mountain range graphic at bottom; "19 COLORADO 63" at top	none	AB-1234	County-coded	
	1964	As 1962 base, but with "19 COLORADO 64" at bottom	none	AB-1234	County-coded	
	1965	As 1963 base, but with "19 COLORADO 65" at top	none	AB-1234	County-coded	
	1966	As 1962 base, but with "19 COLORADO 66" at bottom	none	AB-1234	County-coded	
	1967	As 1963 base, but with "19 COLORADO 67" at top	none	AB-1234	County-coded	
	1968	As 1962 base, but with "19 COLORADO 68" at bottom	none	AB-1234	County-coded	
	1969	As 1963 base, but with "19 COLORADO 69" at top	none	AB-1234	County-coded	
	1970	As 1962 base, but with "19 COLORADO 70" at bottom	none	AB-1234	County-coded	
	1971	As 1963 base, but reflective, and with "19 COLORADO 71" at top	none	AB-1234	County-coded	
	1972	Debossed white serial on reflective green plate with border line; mountain range graphic at top; "19 COLORADO 72" at bottom	none	AB-1234	County-coded	
	1973	Embossed green serial on reflective white plate with border line; "19 COLORADO 73" at bottom	"Colorful" centered at top	AB-1234	County-coded	
	1974	Debossed white serial on reflective green plate with border line; mountain range graphic above serial; "19 COLORADO 74" at bottom	"Colorful" centered at top	AB-1234	County-coded	

=== 1975 to present ===
Image	Dates issued	Design	Slogan	Serial format	Serials issued	Notes
	1975–76	Embossed red on reflective white and blue graphic	Centennial	AB-1234	County-coded	Commemorated Colorado's 100 years of statehood. Awarded "Plate of the Year" for best new license plate of 1975 by the Automobile License Plate Collectors Association, the first and, to date, only time Colorado has been so honored.
	1976	Embossed red on reflective white	Centennial	AB-1234	County-coded	Issued at end of Centennial graphic supply.
	1977–81	Embossed white on reflective green; mountains at top	none	AB-1234	County-coded	Letters I and O added to serials following the introduction of the ABC1234 format. With the addition of the letter O, the die for the digit '0' was changed for better differentiation.
	1982 – June; 1992	Embossed white on reflective green; mountains at top	none	ABC-123	County-coded	Letters I and O added to serials following the introduction of the ABC1234 format. With the addition of the letter O, the die for the digit '0' was changed for better differentiation.
	July 1992 – December 1999	Embossed white on reflective green; mountains at top	none	ABC1234	County-coded	Letters I and O added to serials following the introduction of the ABC1234 format. With the addition of the letter O, the die for the digit '0' was changed for better differentiation.
	January 2000 – mid 2015	Embossed dark green on reflective graphic plate with white and grey mountains against dark green background	none	123-ABC	001-AAA to 999-ZZZ (see right)	Letter Q not used in serials until 999-ZZZ was issued. Afterwards, Q was added to each position, starting with AAQ-001 to ZZQ-999 and AQA-001 to ZQZ-999, and ending with QAA-001 to QZZ-999.
	mid 2015 – mid 2018	Embossed dark green on reflective graphic plate with white and grey mountains against dark green background	none	ABC-123	Unused 1982–92 serials	Serials progressed from QAA-001 to QZZ-999, then AQA-001 to ZQZ-999, then AAQ-001 to ZZQ-999. Following this, the letter O was used in every position, with the same order of progression.
	mid 2015 – mid 2018	Embossed dark green on reflective graphic plate with white and grey mountains against dark green background	none	ABC-123	Reissued 1982–92 serials	RAA-001 to RDP-999 were issued alongside the Q serials. Subsequent reissues beginning with A, B, C and D followed the O serials.
	mid 2018 – present	Embossed dark green on reflective graphic plate with white and grey mountains against dark green background	none	ABC-D12	AAA-A00 to GCL-J51 (as of October 12, 2026)	Manufactured, but not issued, alphabetically. The most progressive numbers are often found on low-volume special plates, as they are typically issued after being manufactured rather than kept in stock. Letter O not used in fourth position since 2024.

== County coding ==
Colorado introduced numeric county codes on its passenger and motorcycle license plates in 1932, with the order of the codes based on the populations of each of the state's 63 counties at the time. These codes were used through 1958 (except in Denver, which last used code 1 in 1955).

Two-letter codes replaced the numeric codes in 1959, with blocks assigned to each county in the same order. For each code, serials ran to 9999 on passenger plates, and to 999 on motorcycle plates. The move to multi-year plates in the mid-1970s resulted in several counties exhausting their blocks and being assigned new ones.

In 1982, three-letter codes were introduced on passenger plates. AAA through DZZ were assigned to Denver, and GAA through TZZ to the next five most populous counties (Jefferson, El Paso, Boulder, Arapahoe and Adams); blocks of codes in the 'E', 'F', 'U', 'V' and 'W' series were then assigned to the remaining counties in roughly alphabetical order. For each code, serials ran from 001 to 999. Again, several counties exhausted their blocks and were assigned new ones, with Douglas and Elbert borrowing blocks of 'D' series codes from Denver's assignment. From July 1992, serials for each code ran from 1000 to 9999, and the previously unused letters I and O were added. Motorcycle plates continued to use two-letter codes (some of which were reassigned to other counties), with revised formats featuring three and later four digits between the letters (e.g. A123A and A1234A in Denver).

The table below reflects the two- and three-letter codes that were actually issued on passenger plates, rather than what was assigned.

County	Numeric code, 1932–58	Two-letter codes, 1959–81	Three-letter codes, 1982–99
Denver	1	AA–CV	AAA–BMJ
Pueblo	2	GP–HD	VEZ–VPA
Weld	3	HY–JM	WAA–WME
El Paso	4	JX–LL, FR–FV	KAA–LGR
Las Animas	5	LM–LN	UAA–UAV
Larimer	6	LU–MK, FX–FY	FHA–FXT
Boulder	7	ML–NF, FH–FP	MAA–MSZ
Mesa	8	NG–NT	UEJ–ULV
Otero	9	PA–PC	UXS–UYW
Arapahoe	10	PH–RP, FA–FG	PAA–RHD
Jefferson	11	RS–TD, HG–HW	GAA–HKU
Adams	12	TE–UF, GA–GG	SAA–SZF
Logan	13	UG–UJ	UCB–UDE
Fremont	14	UP–UT	EPV–ESU
Morgan	15	UW–UY	UVA–UWJ
Huerfano	16	VE	EZF–EZU
Prowers	17	VG–VH	VDN–VEJ
Delta	18	VL–VN	EFH–EGZ
Yuma	19	VS–VT	WTL–WTY
La Plata	20	VV–VY	FDF–FFL
Montrose	21	WB–WD	USM–UUD
Baca	22	WG	EBE–EBK
Rio Grande	23	WJ–WK	VVW–VWS
Garfield	24	WM–WR	ETW–EWB
Conejos	25	WS	EDV–EED
Kit Carson	26	WU–WV	WUZ–WVJ
Washington	27	WW	WST–WTA
Routt	28	WZ–XA	VXA–VXY
Bent	29	XC	EBX–ECF
Alamosa	30	XE–XF	EAA–EAT
Chaffee	31	XH–XJ	FAM–FBN
Montezuma	32	XL–XM	UPY–USE
Lincoln	33	XP	UBL–UBU
Elbert	34	XS	EPB–EPU, DKA–DKC
Saguache	35	XU	VYP–VYX
Crowley	36	XW	EET–EEZ
Phillips	37	XY	VBB–VBG
Costilla	38	YA	EEL–EES
Sedgwick	39	YB	WNL–WNP
Gunnison	40	YD–YE	EYC–EYU
Lake	41	YF–YG	FCD–FCV
Moffat	42	YJ–YK	UNS–UPG
Teller	43	YL	WRN–WSS, VZS–VZV
Eagle	44	YM–YN, ZT	EMB–EPA
Kiowa	45	YP	WUS–WUU
Cheyenne	46	YR	ECM–ECR
Douglas	47	YS–YT, GM	EHW–EMA, FGJ–FGZ, VZZ, WVW–WWF, DAA–DAU
Archuleta	48	YU	FAA–FAK
Rio Blanco	49	YV	VVD–VVP
San Miguel	50	YX	VZF–VZM
Clear Creek	51	YY–YZ	ECU–EDP
Custer	52	ZA	EFB–EFE
Grand	53	ZB–ZC	EWZ–EXU
Park	54	ZD	VAH–VBA, EWW–EWY, EZX–EZZ, VZX–VZY, WWG–WWJ
San Juan	55	ZE	VZB–VZC
Ouray	56	ZF	VAA–VAE
Pitkin	57	ZG, ZP	VBS–VCY
Dolores	58	ZH	EHR–EHT
Jackson	59	ZJ	FGC–FGE
Gilpin	60	ZK	EWN–EWV
Summit	61	ZL, ZR	WNZ–WRJ
Mineral	62	ZM	UNM–UNN
Hinsdale	63	ZN	EZD–EZE

== Non-passenger plates ==
When the current passenger baseplate was introduced in 2000, the state also simplified its non-passenger and specialty plates, issuing them in the same serial format (originally 123-ABC) and with similar graphic elements.

=== 2000 to present ===
The serials on non-passenger types are embossed unless noted.

Image	Type	Notes
	Apportioned Permanent Trailer	Red background; stacked "PRM" prefix.
	Apportioned Tractor	Red background; stacked "ATR" prefix.
	Apportioned Trailer	Red background; stacked "ATL" prefix.
Colorado Apportioned Truck license plate	Apportioned Truck	Red background; stacked "ATK" prefix.
	Colorado State Patrol	Black background; surface-printed serials in a format of CSP 123.
Colorado Fleet License Plate	Commercial Fleet	Red background; stacked "FLT" prefix.
	Dealer	Blue background; stacked "DLR" prefix.
	Dealer—Demo	Blue background; stacked "DMO" prefix.
Colorado Dealer In Transit license plate	Dealer—In Transit	Blue background; stacked "INT" prefix.
	Depot	Blue background; stacked "DPT" prefix.
Colorado Disabled Person license plate	Disabled Person	Green background; wheelchair in center; surface-printed serials.
	Farm Tractor	Green background; stacked "FTR" prefix. Personalized variant also issued, with surface-printed serial.
	Farm Truck	Green background; stacked "FTK" prefix. Personalized variant also issued, with surface-printed serial.
	Government	Green background; stacked "GVT" prefix.
	Gross Vehicle Weight Tractor	Red background; stacked "TVW" prefix.
	Gross Vehicle Weight Truck	Red background; stacked "GVW" prefix. Personalized variant also issued, with surface-printed serial.
	Manufacturer	Blue background; stacked "MFG" prefix.
	Recreational Truck	Green background; stacked "RTK" prefix.
	Special Mobile Machine	Green background; stacked "SMM" prefix.
	Special Mobile Machine—Exempt	Green background; stacked "SMX" prefix; motorcycle-sized plate.
Colorado Taxicab license plate	Taxicab	Yellow background, TAXI in center; surface-printed serial.
	Trailer	Green background; stacked "TRL" prefix.
	Transporter	Blue background; stacked "TPR" prefix.
	Truck	Green background; stacked "TRK" prefix.

=== Prior to 2000 ===
Image	Type	Design	Serial format	Notes
	Disabled Person	Reflective white on green.	12345	
	Fleet	Reflective gold on blue.	1234IA5	

== Specialty plates ==
=== 2000 to present ===
Specialty types have surface-printed serials. Some types are available in personalized format, in which case the type logo, which normally appears at the center of the plate between the numbers and the letters of the serial, is absent.

Image	Type	Notes
	150th Statehood Anniversary (13+)	Available August 1, 2023 through August 1, 2027. Plate selected by popular vote.
	150th Statehood Anniversary (Under 13)	Available August 1, 2023 through August 1, 2027. Plate selected by popular vote.
	10th Mountain Division	
	4th Infantry Division	Motorcycle variant also issued.
	"Adopt a Greyhound"	
	"Adopt a Shelter Pet"	Personalized, motorcycle, and personalized motorcycle variants also issued; neither personalized variant has the logo at the center.
	"Advancing Clean Energy"	Discontinued. See electric vehicle and Go Carbon Neutral plates.
	Air Force Cross	Motorcycle variant also issued.
	ALS	
	Amateur Radio—Commercial	Stacked "CCL" prefix. Serial is callsign.
	Amateur Radio—Passenger	Stacked "SCL" prefix. Serial is callsign.
	American Indian Scholars	Personalized, motorcycle, and personalized motorcycle variants also issued; neither personalized variant has the logo at the center.
	Aviation	
	Born To Be Wild	Personalized, motorcycle, and personalized motorcycle variants also issued; neither personalized variant has the logo at the center.
	Boy Scouts	
	Broncos Country	Personalized, motorcycle, and personalized motorcycle variants also issued; neither personalized variant has the logo at the center.
	Bronze Star	Motorcycle variant also issued.
	Bronze Star of Valor	Motorcycle variant also issued.
	Child Loss Awareness	Personalized, motorcycle, and personalized motorcycle variants also issued; neither personalized variant has the logo at the center.
	Childhood Cancer Awareness	
	Civil Air Patrol	
	Collector Truck/Tractor	Personalized variant also issued, with no logo at center.
	Collector Vehicle	Personalized variant also issued, with no logo at center.
	Colorado Avalanche Country	
	Colorado College	Personalized variant also issued, with no logo at center.
	Colorado Mesa University	Personalized variant also issued, with no logo at center.
	Colorado School of Mines	Personalized variant also issued, with no logo at center.
	Colorado State University	Personalized variant also issued, with no logo at center.
	Colorado Rockies Country	
	Colorado State University Pueblo	Personalized variant also issued, with no logo at center.
	"Committed to a Cure"	Personalized, motorcycle, and personalized motorcycle variants also issued; neither personalized variant has the logo at the center.
	Denver Firefighter	
	Denver Nuggets Country	
	Designer	Serial is embossed. Personalized variant also issued.
	Designer—Truck	Stacked "TRK" prefix; serial is embossed.
	Disabled Veteran	Motorcycle variant also issued.
	Disabled Veteran Handicapped	Motorcycle variant also issued.
	Distinguished Flying Cross	Motorcycle variant also issued.
	Distinguished Service Cross	Motorcycle variant also issued.
	Donate Life	
	"Elks Care, Elks Share"	
	Fallen Airman	Motorcycle variant also issued.
	Fallen Guardsman	Motorcycle variant also issued.
	Fallen Marine	Motorcycle variant also issued.
	Fallen Sailor	Motorcycle variant also issued.
	Fallen Soldier	Motorcycle variant also issued.
	Firefighter	Motorcycle variant also issued.
	Fort Lewis College	Personalized variant also issued, with no logo at center.
	Go Carbon Neutral	
	"Growing Your Future"	Personalized variant also issued, with no logo at center.
	Honorably Discharged Veteran	Plate is screen printed. Motorcycle variant also issued.
	Honorary Consul	
	Horseless Carriage	
	Italian American	Personalized, motorcycle, and personalized motorcycle variants also issued; neither personalized variant has the logo at the center.
	Kids1st	Personalized, motorcycle, and personalized motorcycle variants also issued; neither personalized variant has the logo at the center.
	Korean War Veteran	Motorcycle variant also issued.
	Medal of Honor	Motorcycle variant also issued.
	Member U.S. Congress	
	Member U.S. Senate	
	Mesa Verde National Park	
	Motorcycle Collector	Issued only on motorcycles. Personalized variant also issued, with no logo at center.
	MSU Denver	Personalized variant also issued, with no logo at center.
	National Guard	
	Navy Cross	
	NORAD	Commemorated NORAD's 50th anniversary. Issued from July 1, 2008, through January 1, 2010.
	Pearl Harbor Survivor	
	Pioneer	
	Prisoner of War	
	Purple Heart	
	Regis University	Personalized variant also issued, with no logo at center.
	"Respect Life"	Plate was made to recognize the survivors and victims of the Columbine High School massacre.
	Respects Wildlife	
	Passenger—Personalized	
	Share the Road	Personalized, motorcycle, and personalized motorcycle variants also issued; neither personalized variant has the logo at the center.
	Silver Star	
	Ski Country U.S.A	
	Special Olympics	
	State Representative	R-000 serial format.
	State Senator	S-00 serial format.
	Stegosaurus	
	Street Rod	Personalized variant also issued.
	Submarine Service	
	Support Education	Personalized, motorcycle, and personalized motorcycle variants also issued; neither personalized variant has the logo at the center.
	Support the 10th Mountain Division	
	Support the Horse	
	Support the Troops	Personalized, motorcycle, and personalized motorcycle variants also issued; neither personalized variant has the logo at the center.
	University of Colorado	Personalized variant also issued, with no logo at center.
	University of Denver	Personalized variant also issued, with no logo at center.
	University of Northern Colorado	Personalized variant also issued, with no logo at center.
	U.S. Air Force	Available only to veterans.
	U.S. Air Force 50th Anniversary	Available to general public.
	U.S. Air Force Academy	Personalized variant also issued, with no logo at center.
	U.S. Army	
	U.S. Army Special Forces	
	U.S. Coast Guard	
	U.S. Marine Corps	
	U.S. Navy	
	Vietnam Veteran	
	Western Colorado University	Personalized variant also issued, with no logo at center.
	World War II Veteran	

=== Prior to 2000 ===
Image	Type	Serial format	Notes
	10th Mountain Division	12345E	
	Collector Truck/Tractor	12Z34	
	Collector Vehicle	12N34; 12R34	
	Denim	Coded by county of issuance: A1B1234	Successor to Designer base; issued from July 1992 to December 1999. Still currently revalidated.
	Designer	Coded by county of issuance: A1B-123	Issued from January 1989 to June 1992. Still currently revalidated.
	Firefighter	12345F	
	Honorably Discharged Veteran	12345B	
	Pioneers	12345D	
	Purple Heart	012345	
	United States Air Force	12345C	

== Renewal date tags ==
Colorado implemented a monthly staggered registration system in 1978, with separate stickers for the month and year of the expiration date (placed at the bottom left and bottom right of the plate respectively). As of 2024, month stickers are blue on white, while year stickers rotate through a four-color system introduced in 2002, as follows:

- 02
- 06
- 10
- 14
- 18
- 22
- 26
- 03
- 07
- 11
- 15
- 19
- 23
- 27
- 04
- 08
- 12
- 16
- 20
- 24
- 05
- 09
- 13
- 17
- 21
- 25

== See also ==
- Colorado Department of Revenue
- Colorado Department of Transportation
- History of Colorado
