= Task Force on the Implementation of Amendment 64 =

Task force of Colorado

The Task Force on the Implementation of Amendment 64 was a task force of Colorado, charged with considering and resolving a number of policy, legal and procedural issues relating to Colorado Amendment 64, which allows for personal use and regulation of marijuana.

On 10 December 2012, Governor Hickenlooper signed Executive Order B 2012-004 to create the Task Force to "consider and resolve a number of policy, legal and procedural issues". The task force had a deadline of February 28 to submit its proposals, and on March 13, 2013 issued 58 recommendations on how recreational pot should be grown, sold and taxed in the state.

Its membership was composed of:

1. Jack Finlaw, Co-Chair: Governor's Chief Legal Counsel
2. Barbara Brohl, Co-Chair: Executive Director of the Colorado Department of Revenue
3. Rep. Dan Pabon, appointed by the incoming Speaker of the House
4. Sen. Cheri Jahn, appointed by the incoming President of the Senate
5. Newly elected Rep. Dan Nordberg, appointed by the incoming House Minority Leader
6. Newly elected Sen. Vicki Marble, appointed by the incoming Senate Minority Leader
7. David Blake, representing the Colorado Attorney General
8. Kevin Bommer, representing the Colorado Municipal League
9. Eric Bergman, representing Colorado Counties Inc.
10. Chris Urbina, the Executive Director of the Colorado Department of Public Health and Environment
11. James Davis, the Executive Director of the Colorado Department of Public Safety
12. John Salazar, the Colorado Commissioner of Agriculture
13. Ron Kammerzell, the Senior Director responsible for the Colorado Medical Marijuana Enforcement Division
14. Christian Sederberg, representing the campaign to pass Amendment 64
15. Meg Sanders, representing the medical marijuana dispensary and cultivation industry
16. Craig Small, representing marijuana consumers
17. Sam Kamin, a person with expertise in legal issues related to the legalization of marijuana
18. Dr. Christian Thurstone, a person with expertise in the treatment of marijuana addiction
19. Charles Garcia, representing the Colorado Commission on Criminal and Juvenile Justice
20. Larry Abrahamson, representing the Colorado District Attorney's Council
21. Brian Connors, representing the Colorado State Public Defender
22. Daniel Zook, an at-large member from outside of the Denver area
23. Tamra Ward, representing the interests of employers
24. Mike Cerbo, representing the interests of employees
