= Law of Colorado =

The law of Colorado consists of several levels, including constitutional, statutory, regulatory, local, and case law. The Colorado Revised Statutes form the general statutory law.

== Sources ==
The Constitution of Colorado is the foremost source of state law. Legislation is enacted by the Colorado General Assembly, published in the Session Laws of Colorado, and codified in the Colorado Revised Statutes. State agencies promulgate regulations in the Colorado Register, which are in turn codified in the Code of Colorado Regulations. Colorado's legal system is based on common law, which is interpreted by case law through the decisions of the Supreme Court and the Court of Appeals, which are published in the Colorado Reporter and Pacific Reporter. Counties and municipalities may also promulgate local ordinances. In addition, there are also several sources of persuasive authority, which are not binding authority but are useful to lawyers and judges insofar as they help to clarify the current state of the law.

=== Constitution ===
The foremost source of state law is the Constitution of Colorado, which like other state constitutions derives its power and legitimacy from the sovereignty of the people. The Colorado Constitution in turn is subordinate only to the Constitution of the United States, which is the supreme law of the land.

=== Legislation ===
Pursuant to the state constitution, the Colorado General Assembly has enacted various laws. The bills and concurrent resolutions passed by a particular General Assembly session, together with those resolutions and memorials designated for printing by the House of Representatives and the Senate, are contained in the Session Laws of Colorado. These in turn have been codified in the Colorado Revised Statutes (C.R.S.).

=== Regulations ===
Cover page of the Colorado Register

Pursuant to certain broadly worded statutes, state agencies have promulgated an enormous body of regulations, published in the Colorado Register and codified in the Code of Colorado Regulations (CCR), which carry the force of law to the extent they do not conflict with any statutes or the state or federal Constitutions.

=== Case law ===
Colorado's legal system is based on a political party common law. Like all U.S. states except Louisiana, Colorado has a reception statute providing for the "reception" of English law. All statutes, regulations, and ordinances are subject to judicial review. Pursuant to common law tradition, the courts of Colorado have developed a large body of case law through the decisions of the Colorado Supreme Court and the Colorado Court of Appeals.

There is no official reporter. The Colorado Reporter (a Colorado-specific version of the Pacific Reporter) is an unofficial reporter for appellate decisions from 1883. Decisions of the Colorado Supreme Court were published in the official Colorado Reports from 1864 to 1980, and decisions of the Court of Appeals were published in the official Colorado Court of Appeals Reports from 1891 to 1980.

=== Local ordinances ===
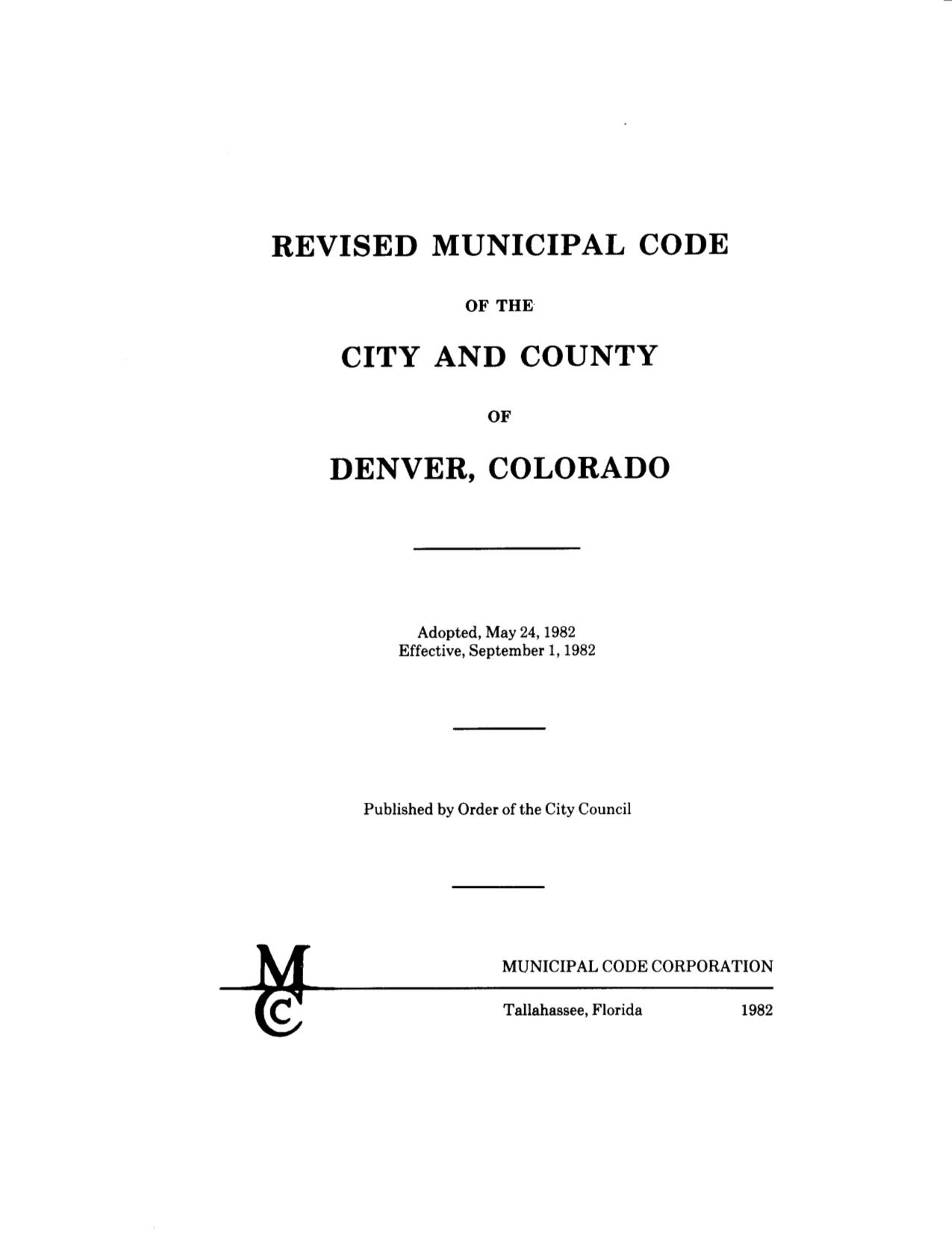
Title page of the Denver Revised Municipal Code

Colorado is divided into 64 counties, as well as some 271 active incorporated municipalities, including 196 towns, 73 cities, and two consolidated city and county governments.

Colorado counties have the authority to adopt and enforce ordinances and resolutions regarding health, safety, and welfare issues "as otherwise prescribed by law" which are not in conflict with any state statute, as well as the power to adopt ordinances for control or licensing of those matters of purely local concern in a number of policy areas. All such ordinances of a general or permanent nature and those imposing any fine, penalty, or forfeiture must be published.

Colorado municipalities have the power to adopt ordinances which are necessary and proper to provide for the safety, preserve the health, promote the prosperity, and improve the morals, order, comfort, and convenience of the municipality and its inhabitants and which are not in conflict with any laws, and have the power to enforce them with fines of up to $2,650.00, imprisonment for up to one year or both. All such ordinances of a general or permanent nature and those imposing any fine, penalty, or forfeiture must be published in a local newspaper, or three local public places otherwise.

== See also ==
=== Topics ===
- Drug policy of Colorado
- Capital punishment in Colorado
- Felony murder rule (Colorado)
- Gun laws in Colorado

=== Other ===
- Politics of Colorado
- Law enforcement in Colorado
- Crime in Colorado
- Law of the United States
