= THC (disambiguation) =

THC is tetrahydrocannabinol, the main active chemical compound in cannabis.

THC or ThC may also refer to:

== Arts, entertainment and media ==
- T.H.C. (band), an American trip hop band
- The H Collective, an American film company
- Texas Hippie Coalition, an American heavy metal band
- The Human Centipede (First Sequence), a 2009 Dutch horror film

== Businesses and organizations ==
- Taiwan Halal Center, in Taipei, Taiwan
- Tenet Healthcare Corporation, US
- Texas Historical Commission, US
- Tower Hamlets College, in London, England
- Transport Holding Company, a British Government–owned company of the 1960s
- Thüringer HC, a German handball club

== Science ==
- Temperate herbaceous clade, a monophyletic clade of legumes
- Tetrahydrochrysene, an estrogenic and antiestrogenic compound
- Thermohaline circulation, an ocean current
- Thorium(IV) carbide (ThC), an inorganic compound
- Total hydrocarbon content, measured using a flame ionization detector

== Other uses ==
- Tuyamuyun Hydro Complex, interconnected reservoirs and canals bordering Turkmenistan and Uzbekistan
