= Cannabis tourism in the United States =

Cannabis tourism in the United States is a form of tourism that exists in recreationally legal cannabis states. As of November 2026, 24 states, Washington, D.C., and two territories (Guam and the Northern Mariana Islands) have legalized recreational cannabis.

In 2014, the travel guide Fodors published a "how to" for cannabis tourists in Washington state. The official Washington tourism website has a FAQ section for cannabis tourism.

In 2013, prior to legalization, the Washington State Liquor Control Board (now the Washington State Liquor and Cannabis Board) commissioned a study of cannabis legalization on the state, including the impact of tourism. The study, written by Carnegie Mellon University researchers, estimated over 400,000 new visits a year to the state. The Washington State legislature specifically considered tourism in its 2015 I-502 reform. One legal expert stated "Washington’s cannabis tourism industry is in jeopardy" as a result.

Because consumption in public is illegal, rentals like (Bud and Breakfast) and Airbnb include "420 friendly" in descriptions for cannabis tourists, and cannabis tourism rental specialists have sprung up to meet demand. Some states like Illinois have provided an “on-premise” consumption license for dispensaries and any businesses that sell some form of cannabis, whether it be a dispensary, cannabis-infused restaurant or coffee shop like those commonly found in Amsterdam.

The actual impact of cannabis tourism is debated. Industry groups say it is significant, but state tourism officials in Washington said there is "fairly low amounts of consumer interest through our visitor information", and in Colorado "We still don't have any numbers that support that marijuana tourism exists". An NBC News report stated that Hotels.com bookings were up slightly after legalization in both states.

Manitou Springs is a small town in El Paso County, Colorado. It is home to two recreational cannabis dispensaries, the only two in the second most populous county in the state. As a direct result of recreational cannabis sales the city's tax base increased. Manitou sales tax collections set a record in July 2014, which included only a few hours of recreational cannabis sales for the month. One operator's Manitou Springs location is their most popular, due to its location at the foot of Pike’s Peak.

== Expansion ==
Tourism in Oregon was expected to begin in 2016 with legal retail availability for non-residents.

Expansion of cannabis tourism to Vermont, and to Mendocino and Humboldt Counties, California, has been discussed.

Tourism in Colorado has since seen a decline by 22% in cannabis tourism from 2021 to 2022. In that city report, in 2022, Denver fell to its lowest percentage since legalizing, following along with comments from state tourism officials in Washington.

== Books ==
- Hecht, P. (2014). Weed Land: Inside America's Marijuana Epicenter and How Pot Went Legit. University of California Press. ISBN 978-0-520-95824-1.
- Caulkins, J.P.; Kilmer, B.; Kleiman, M.A.R.; MacCoun, R.J.; Midgette, G.; Oglesby, P.; Pacula, R.L.; Reuter, P.H. (2015). Considering Marijuana Legalization: Insights for Vermont and Other Jurisdictions. RAND Corporation. ISBN 978-0-8330-8877-2.
