= Legislative staff in Colorado =

Legislative staffers in Colorado are employees of the state tasked with supporting the function of the Colorado General Assembly and the members who comprise that body. With very few exceptions, these personnel are non-partisan public servants. Colorado employs a total of 345 legislative staff across various functions.

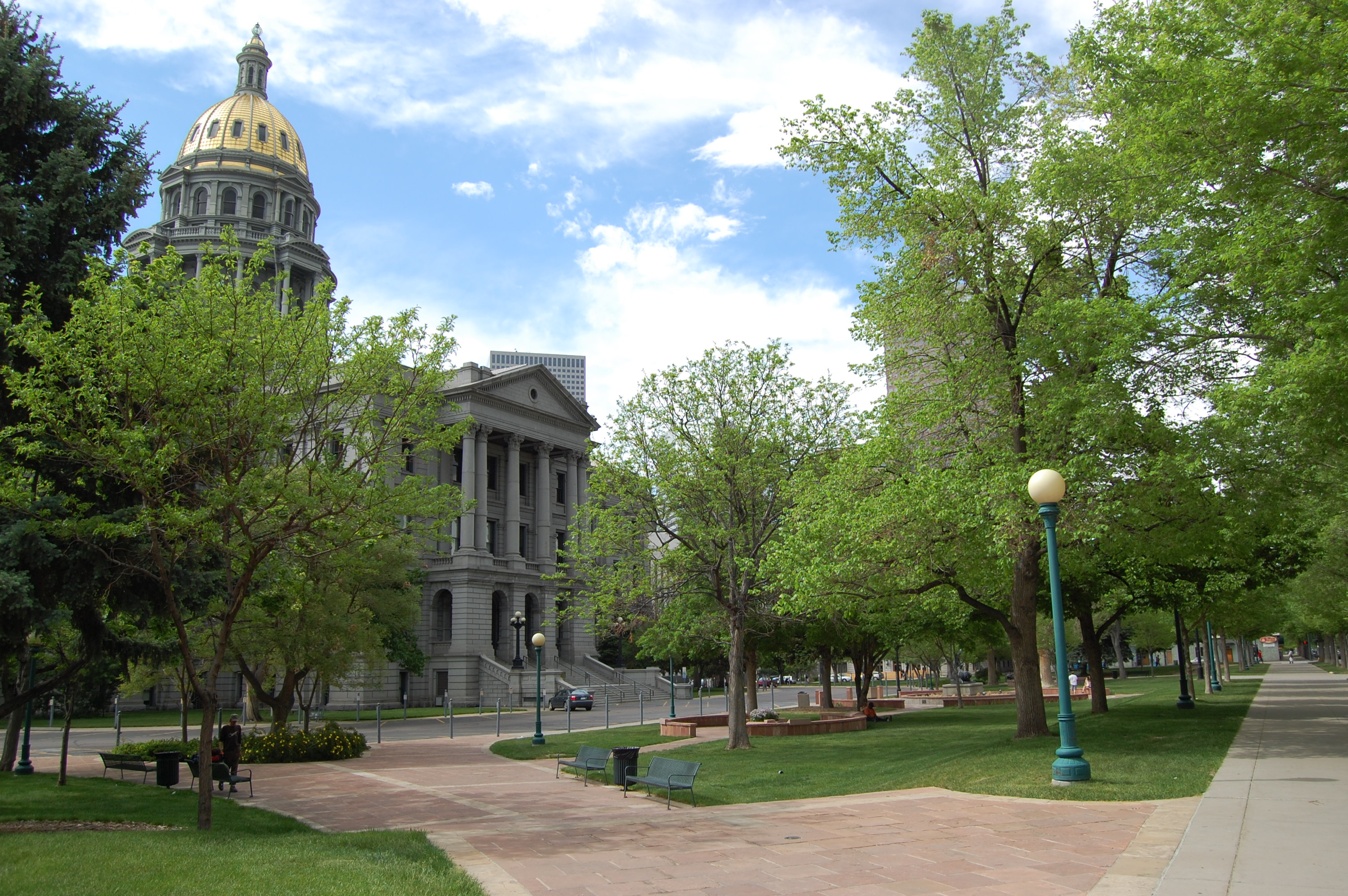
The Colorado State Capitol Building, the center of the Capitol Complex

== Types of staff members ==
NCSL classifies Colorado's legislative staff members into five broad categories:

- Member staff, who work for individual members of the General Assembly,
- Administrative staff, who support numerous functions of the legislature,
- Committee staff, who serve House and Senate committees as well as the Joint Budget Committee,
- Communications and leadership staff, who work for the majority and minority parties,
- Legal service staff, who provide legal advice and draft and revise statutory language.

== Member staff ==
Member staff, also called personal staff, are individuals who work directly for a specific legislator. These staffers serve at the pleasure of their respective state representative or senator and their employment with the state ends once their legislator leaves office or is defeated in an election. While technically the employment of these individuals is approved or denied by the Secretary of the Senate or the Chief Clerk of the House, selections are generally made independently by each elected official.

Common staff titles include: Legislative Aide, Legislative Assistant, Administrative Assistant, Executive Assistant, and Chief of Staff. Most official state documents use the blanket term Legislative Aide to refer to all member staff in Colorado.

=== Salary and benefits ===
The salary and benefits of member staff are set by the Executive Committee of the Legislative Council. Each legislative office is allotted a total of $4,200 per year for staff expenses. Each member of the legislature may employ, at most, two staffers as state employees. Other staff must serve as volunteers, interns, be paid out of pocket, or be reimbursed by campaign committees.

Technically, total billable man-hours may not exceed 420 per employee per session; though legislative staffers frequently work 40–60 hours per week, they may only bill the state for their first 24 hours per week at a rate of $10 per hour. Staff salary is based on the 120 business-day cycle of the regular session. Consequently, member staff are classified as session-only employees, meaning they can be paid only for work performed while the General Assembly is meeting, usually from mid-January through early May.

As employees of the State of Colorado, legislative aides participate in the Colorado Public Employees Retirement Association, to which the state makes supplementary contributions. Health, vision, and dental insurance are not provided, but may be purchased by employees. The state does not provide for sick pay or paid vacation days.

=== Responsibilities ===
Responsibilities for personal staff vary considerably from office to office. Senior staffers in offices with multiple employees, volunteers, and interns incur considerably more managerial responsibility than do their peers in more-sparsely staffed offices. Similarly, the scope of duties of staffers working for senior committee members or legislators from swing districts may not resemble the responsibilities of other members' staffs.

According to NCSL, the core responsibilities of personal legislative staff are to: "provide direct support to a member as they prepare for session, hearings or meetings and assist the member as they work with constituents." The Executive Committee describes their responsibilities to include:

Performing constituent service; editing and proofreading draft legislation; performing or assisting in administrative tasks to ensure the legislative office functions smoothly; providing basic legislative research; scheduling for the member; coordinating with statutory drafters and executive agencies; attending meetings in and around the district or Capitol Complex; maintaining knowledge of the location of the member at all times; receiving visitors or guests of the legislator; assisting the member in all pertinent legislative duties.

Furthermore, a small secretarial pool is made available to legislators to handle printing, basic communication, and other administrative tasks. This service is shared among all members of the General Assembly, irrespective of party affiliation. These staffers may be asked to perform a limited variety of germane tasks.

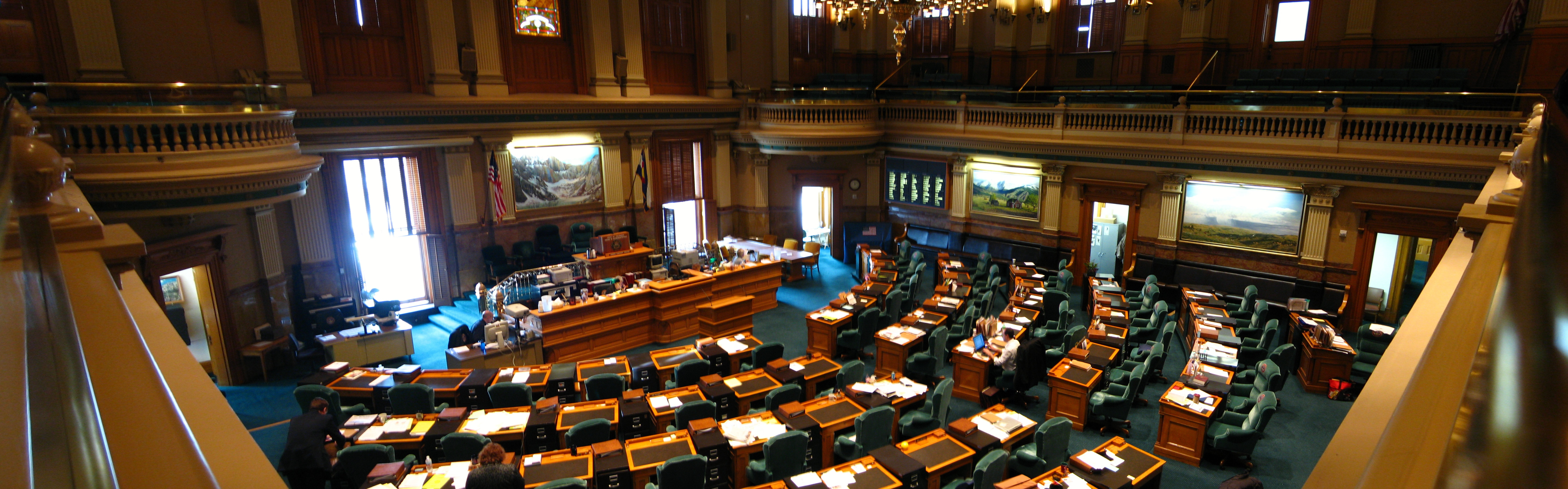
House of Representatives

=== Volunteers and interns ===
Competition for paid member staff positions is often intense. Because of the state's limited budget for paid staffers, most offices rely heavily on unpaid volunteers and interns. These employees report to an office's chief of staff, senior legislative aide, or directly to the member. As with aides, unpaid staff have varying levels of responsibility based on the legislative district and the staffer's level of education or experience.

A number of institutions of higher education in Colorado partner with the Colorado General Assembly to provide statehouse internship programs. The most-publicized of these is Colorado State University's legislative internship program, founded by longtime statehouse observer Dr. John Straayer. The program, operated continuously since 1996, provides interns to legislative offices two days per week during the entire legislative session. Some of the other institutions in the state which periodically run internship programs include: the University of Denver, the Sturm College of Law, the University of Colorado, the University of Colorado Law School, the Metropolitan State University of Denver, and Regis University.

== Administrative staff ==
The administrative staff of the Colorado General Assembly support a number of different functions of the institution. Most prominently, these include the Chief Clerk of the House and the Secretary of the Senate, the chief administrative staffers of each respective body. The legislature employs approximately 50 economists and fiscal note drafters as analysts and support personnel.

The General Assembly also employs enrolling and other clerks, payroll staffers, a small number of human resources staff, publications staff, and constituent services staff. Administrative staffers also include IT support staff, librarians, and state employees and volunteers who provide tours to members of the general public.

=== Salary and benefits ===
Administrative staff salaries vary widely based on job description. The state provides a fixed contribution towards the purchase of medical and dental insurance for these staffers. They have approximately 10 days per year of sick leave (6.66 hours earned per month), and enjoy 10 paid holidays per year.

== Committee staff ==
The committees of the Colorado General Assembly employ a small number of specialists as staffers to support their function. The bulk of these employees are committee secretaries. The state's Joint Budget Committee, tasked with drafting the state's annual budget, also employs its own economists and support staffers. All told, there are 17 Joint Budget Committee staffers and 35 staffers for the other standing committees for a total of 52 committee staff.

== Communications and leadership staff ==
The only partisan staffers employed by the General Assembly are in the House and Senate's minority and majority communications and leadership offices. These staffers are tasked with coordinating the messaging for members of their respective caucus, as well as providing them with supplemental policy analysis.

Job titles include the majority / minority chief of staff, the deputy majority / minority chief of staff, the majority / minority press secretary, majority / minority research assistant, the majority / minority communications / media director, the deputy majority / minority communications director, and the majority and minority legislative directors. All told, there are 32 communications and leadership staff members.

=== Salary and benefits ===
Communications and leadership staff are salaried at between $30,000 and $52,000 per year based on their position. The state provides a fixed contribution towards the purchase of medical and dental insurance for these staffers. They have approximately 10 days per year of sick leave (6.66 hours earned per month), and enjoy 10 paid holidays per year.

== Legal service staff ==
Colorado's Office of Legislative Legal Services (OLLS) includes legislative drafters and legal counsel for the Colorado General Assembly. These staffers write statutory language, assist in bill drafting, keep legislative records, review executive regulations to ensure they comply with statute, provide a host of publication services to publish new statutes, and make recommendations to legislative leadership. As with most legislative staffers in Colorado, legal service staffers are non-partisan. About 24 attorneys and 25 support staffers are employed as legislative legal service staff in Colorado. The Office is under the supervision of the Committee on Legal Services.

=== Responsibilities ===
Responsibilities do vary from position to position, but a typical staffer will:

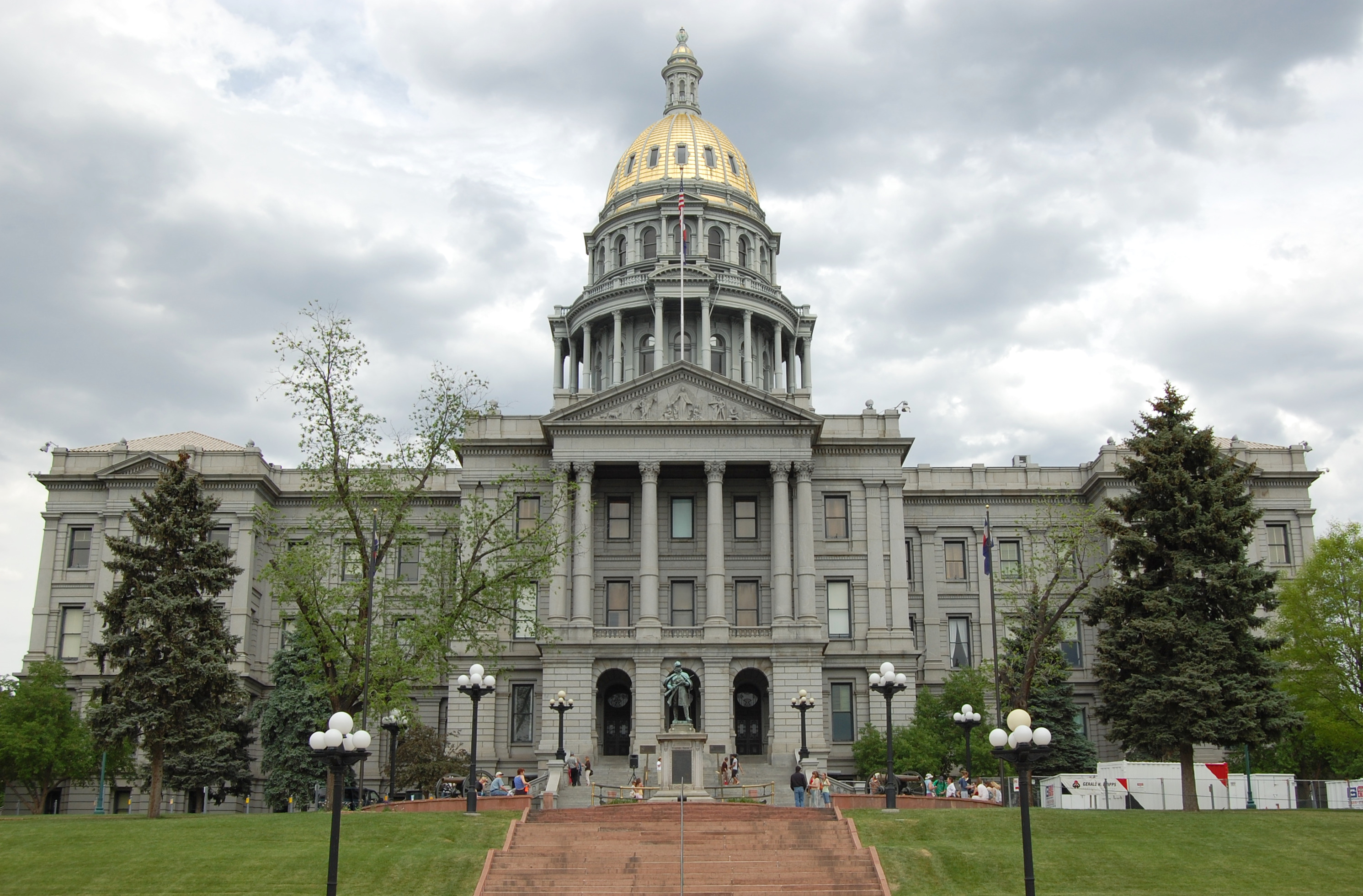
Colorado State Capitol Building

Draft legislation and amendments to legislation that are legally correct, accurately reflect the intent of their sponsors, are written comprehensibly in grammatically correct plain English, and adhere to all other Office style and format requirements; Annotating Colorado Supreme Court and Court of Appeals cases that apply or interpret the Colorado constitution, the Colorado Revised Statutes, or Colorado Court Rules; Reviewing, editing, and proofreading legislation, amendments to legislation, legal memorandums, and other written Office work product; Conducting policy and legal research; Edits legislation, amendments to legislation, legal memorandums, and other written office work product, including graphical presentation materials, for grammar, spelling, punctuation, comprehensibility, and adherence to all other Office style and format requirements; Prepare charts, tables, and other graphical presentation and research materials; Reviews executive branch agency rules to determine whether they are within the rule-making authority of the promulgating agency.

== Other employees at the Capitol Complex ==
There are also a number of security staff present at the Capitol Complex in Denver. These include members of the Colorado State Patrol, security screeners, executive protection details, and the Sergeants at Arms who provide security and enforce House and Senate decorum.
