= Thorium(IV) carbide =

Inorganic compound

Identifiers
CAS Number	12012-16-7
3D model (JSmol)	Interactive image
ECHA InfoCard	100.031.418
EC Number	234-574-0
PubChem CID	72720427
- InChI: InChI=1S/C.Th Key: AHPYHEXQCXTQEB-UHFFFAOYSA-N
- SMILES: [C]#[Th]

Properties
Chemical formula	ThC
Molar mass	244.049 g/mol
Appearance	crystals
Density	10.6 g/cm^{3}, solid
Melting point	2,500 °C (4,530 °F; 2,770 K)

Structure
Crystal structure	cubic
- Except where otherwise noted, data are given for materials in their standard state (at 25 °C [77 °F], 100 kPa). verify (what is ?) Infobox references

Thorium(IV) carbide (ThC) is an inorganic thorium compound and a carbide.
