= Colorado General Assembly =

Legislative branch of the state government of Colorado

Coordinates: 39.7392°N 104.9848°W

- 75th Colorado General Assembly

Type
- Type: Bicameral
- Houses: Senate; House of Representatives

History
- New session started: January 8, 2025

Leadership
- Senate President: James Coleman (D) since January 8, 2025
- House Speaker: Julie McCluskie (D) since January 9, 2023

Structure
- Seats: 100; 35 Senators; 65 Representatives
- Senate political groups: Democratic (23); Republican (12)
- House of Representatives political groups: Majority: Democratic (43); Minority: Republican (22)

Elections
- Last Senate election: November 5, 2024; 17 seats
- Last House of Representatives election: November 5, 2024; 65 seats
- Next Senate election: November 3, 2026; 18 seats
- Next House of Representatives election: November 3, 2026; 65 seats

Meeting place
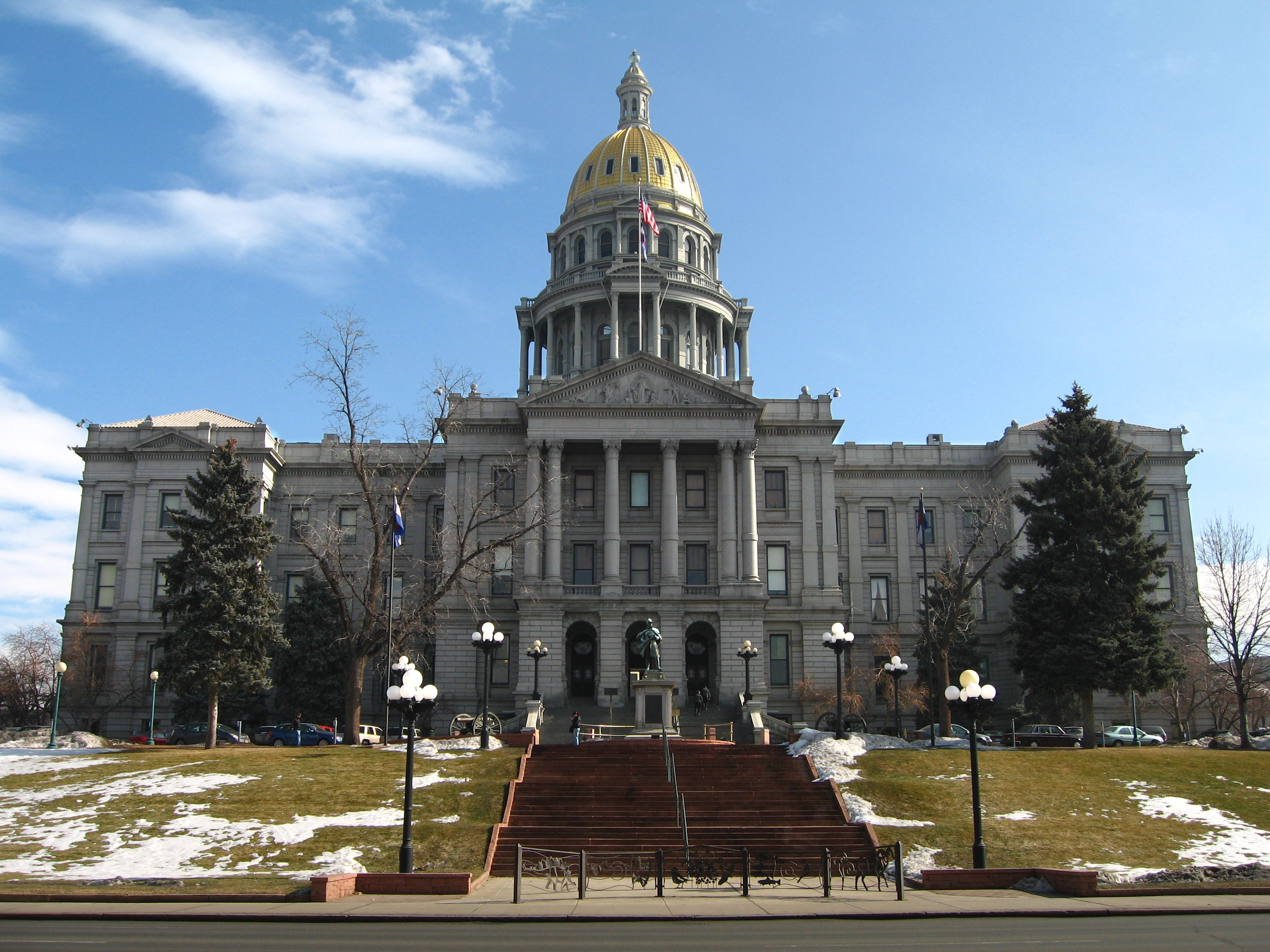
- Colorado State Capitol; Denver

Website
- Colorado General Assembly

Constitution
- Constitution of Colorado

The Colorado General Assembly is the state legislature of the State of Colorado. It is a bicameral legislature consisting of the Senate and House of Representatives that was created by the 1876 state constitution. Its statutes are codified in the Colorado Revised Statutes (C.R.S.). The session laws are published in the Session Laws of Colorado.

Colorado's legislature is similar to those of other states, except that, unlike many states, Colorado does not give its lieutenant governor any legislative authority (e.g. tie-breaking vote).

== History ==
The first meeting of the Colorado General Assembly took place from November 1, 1876, through March 20, 1877. Succeeding sessions met every two years until 1950, when it began to meet annually.

In 1966, Colorado voters passed Amendment 4, which constitutionally mandated that the legislature have 100 members, with 35 in the Senate and 65 in the House of Representatives. Additionally, it required that Colorado adopt single member districts. These changes would take effect beginning at the start of the 47th General Assembly in 1969.

The lieutenant governor served as Senate President until 1974 when Article V, Section 10 of the state constitution was amended, granting the Colorado Senate the right to elect one of its own members as President.

== Constitutional definition ==
The Colorado Constitution establishes a system of government based on the separation of powers doctrine with power divided among the executive, legislative and judicial branches of government. Article V vests the legislative power of the state in the General Assembly, while reserving to the people the power to propose, approve, and reject both laws and amendments to the state Constitution by initiatives or referendums.

== Composition ==
The General Assembly is bicameral, composed of the Colorado House of Representatives and the Colorado Senate. The House has 65 members and the Senate 35. Members of the House are elected to two-year terms, and members of the Senate are elected to four-year terms.

General legislative elections are held on the first Tuesday after the first Monday in November in each even-numbered year. The entire House is elected in each general election. Senators are elected in two classes such that, as nearly as possible, one-half of the senators are elected in each general election.

House members are limited to four consecutive terms in office, and state senators are limited to two consecutive terms. However, term-limited former members of both houses can run again after a four-year break.

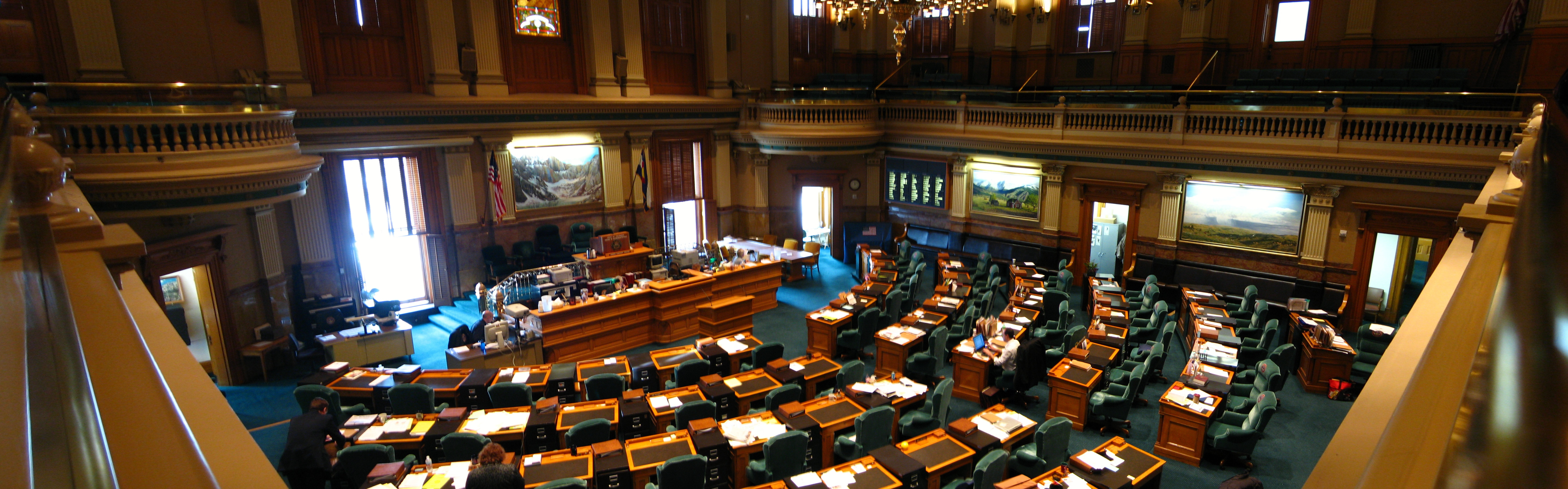
House of Representatives

The vast majority of members of the General Assembly who are ultimately elected (in excess of 90% of members ultimately elected in all recent sessions) are nominated through a major political party caucus process that places candidates on a primary ballot for the position sought in their political party, which generally requires 30% support from delegates to the relevant nominating body of the political party. It is also possible for individuals who have been registered to vote and affiliated with the political party in question for at least a year to gain access to a partisan primary ballot by petition. Minor party candidates can gain access to the general election ballot through a minor party caucus process. Unaffiliated candidates can gain access to the general election ballot by petition.

Vacancies in legislative offices are generally filled by political party vacancy committees, rather than special elections. Vacancy appointees who fill the first half of a state senator's term must stand for election at the next even year November election for the remainder of the state senate term for the seat to which the state senator was appointed.

The state auditor is appointed by the General Assembly, as are many members of independent boards and commissions.

Currently, the Colorado General Assembly is controlled by the Democratic Party. Democrats also hold the governor's office.

The Colorado General Assembly was the first state legislature to welcome women as elected members, with Clara Cressingham, Carrie C. Holly and Frances S. Klock all being elected to the State House of Representatives in 1894 and Helen Robinson being elected to the State Senate in 1912 (the second state upper house in the country to welcome women as members).

== Procedure and powers ==
With the notable exceptions listed below, the Colorado General Assembly operates in a manner quite similar to the United States Congress.

Regular sessions are held annually and begin no later than the second Wednesday in January. Regular sessions last no more than 120 days. Special sessions may be called at any time by the governor or upon written request of two-thirds of the members of each house, but are infrequent. Some committees of the General Assembly work between sessions and have limited power to take action without General Assembly approval between legislative sessions.

Joint procedural rules of the two chambers require most legislation to be introduced very early in the legislative session each year, and to meet strict deadlines for completion of each step of the legislative process. Joint procedural rules also limit each legislator to introducing five bills per year, subject to certain exceptions for non-binding resolutions, uniform acts, interim committee bills and appropriations bills. Most members of the General Assembly decide which bills they will introduce during the legislative session (or most of them) prior to its commencement, limiting the ability of members to introduce new bills at constituent request once the legislative session has begun.

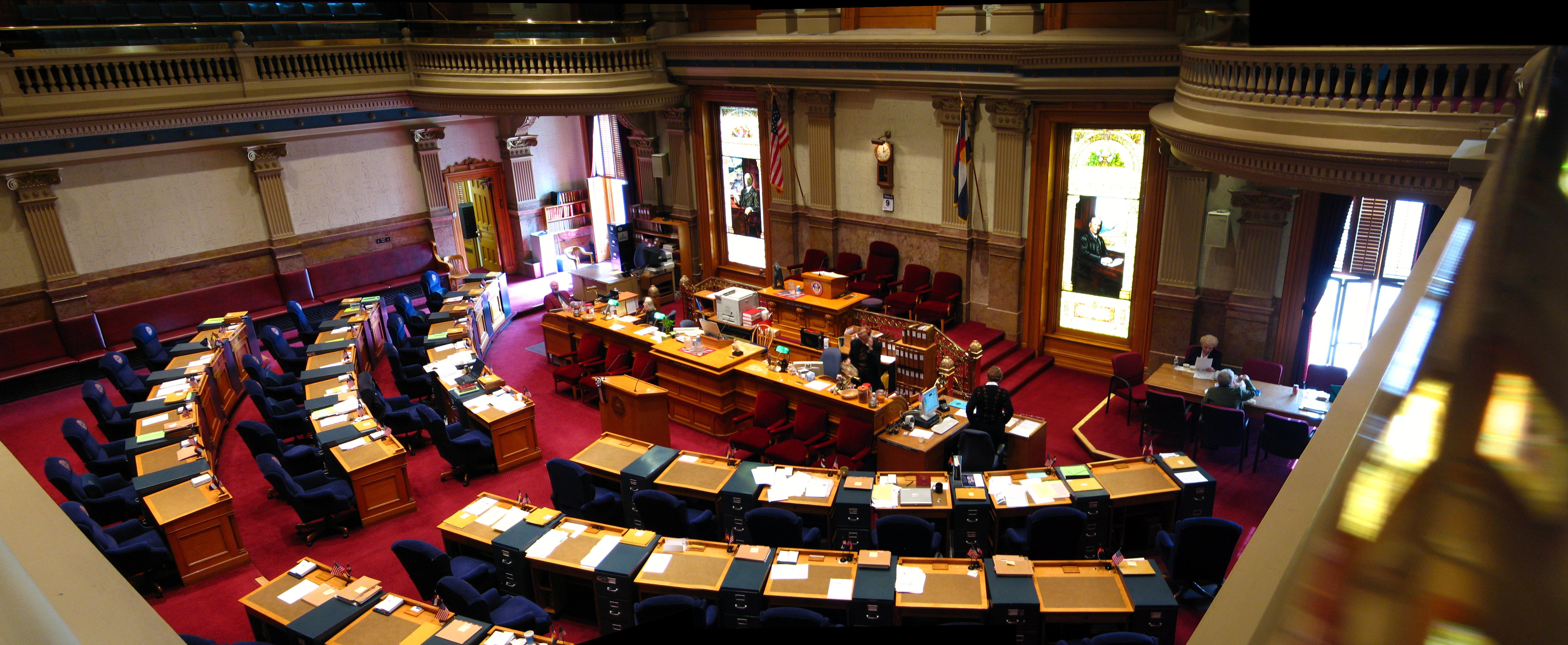
Senate Chamber

Most bills adopted by the General Assembly include a "safety clause" (i.e. a legislative declaration that the bill concerns an urgent matter) and take effect on July 1 following the legislative session unless otherwise provided. Some bills are enacted without a "safety clause" which makes it possible to petition to subject those bills to a referendum before they take effect, and have an effective date in August following the legislative session unless otherwise provided.

Colorado's legislature does not have an analog to the filibuster in the United States Senate requiring a supermajority for approval of any matter. The lieutenant governor does not have the power to preside or break tie votes in either house of the General Assembly. All new executive branch rules are reviewed annually by the legislature and the legislature routinely invalidates some of them each year.

The General Assembly does have subpoena power, However this power is rarely used.

The General Assembly does not have a role in the appointment or retention of state judges, although it must authorize the creation of each judgeship.

Many state agencies and programs are subject to "sunset review" and are automatically abolished if the General Assembly does not reauthorize them.

== Bill drafting ==
Before a bill is introduced in the General Assembly, the text typically passes through several stages. Policy proposals often originate with advocacy organizations, subject-matter experts, or attorneys who identify a need for statutory change. A legislator who agrees to sponsor the proposal then submits it to the Office of Legislative Legal Services (OLLS), the non-partisan in-house legal counsel for the General Assembly. At this point, OLLS will draft or revise the proposed bill text, often in collaboration with the initial advocates or subject-matter experts, to conform to the Colorado Revised Statutes and applicable constitutional requirements. Co-sponsors may join the bill after the text has been formalized.

Entity	Role in process	Contribution to bill text
External originator (e.g., advocates, subject-matter experts, attorneys)	Identifies the need for statutory change and prepares initial proposed language	Produces an initial working draft of the policy
Prime sponsor (legislator)	Agrees to carry the measure and manages its progress through the General Assembly	Provides the draft to OLLS as the basis for a formal bill request
Office of Legislative Legal Services (OLLS)	Non-partisan staff attorneys formalize the bill for introduction	Writes or rewrites the bill text to ensure conformity with the Colorado Revised Statutes and state drafting standards
Co-sponsor (legislator)	Adds their name to signal support for the measure	Typically joins after the bill text has been finalized or introduced

== State budget process ==
The governor submits a proposed budget to the Joint Budget Committee each year in advance of the year's legislative session. Colorado's fiscal year is from July 1 to June 30.

All bills introduced in the General Assembly are evaluated by the non-partisan state legislative services body for their fiscal impact and must be provided for in appropriations legislation if there is a fiscal impact.

A state budget, called the "Long Bill" is prepared each year by the Joint Budget Committee of the General Assembly. Unlike many legislative initiatives, the Long Bill is neither an acronym nor named after an individual with significant influence. The Long Bill is simply a lengthy bill that contains many appropriations. The House and the Senate alternate the job of introducing the long bill and making a first committee review of it. Colorado's state legislature is required to obtain voter approval in order to incur significant debt, to raise taxes, or to increase state constitutional spending limitations. It is also required to comply with a state constitutional spending mandate for K-12 education. The Governor has line item veto power over appropriations.

== Legislative staff ==
The Colorado General Assembly is staffed by approximately 230-year-round staff and 115 session-only staff. Staffing levels and expenditures have decreased since 2003. Similarly to Congressional staffers, legislative staff in Colorado fall into five broad categories: member staff, administrative staff, committee staff, communications and leadership staff, and legal service staff. With the exception of those working in communications and leadership, employees of the General Assembly are non-partisan staffers.

== Current makeup ==
There are 65 House Members and 35 Senate Members making up the 100 seats in Colorado General Assembly. Based on the 2010 census, each House member represents about 77,372 constituents and each Senator 143,691.

The 2018 Colorado elections resulted in Democrats extending their control in the House (41 Democrats; 24 Republicans) and capturing the Senate majority.

All 65 Colorado House seats were up for election in 2022. The chamber's Democratic majority increased to 46-19, keeping a supermajority. Also, the Democrats kept their majority in the 2022 elections for the Colorado State Senate. The current Senate makeup is 23 Democrats and 12 Republicans.

The 74th session will mark the first time in state history that women will hold the majority of seats in the General Assembly.

== See also ==
- Colorado House of Representatives
- Colorado Senate
- Colorado's congressional delegations
- Government of Colorado
- List of Colorado state legislatures
