= Colorado Revised Statutes =

Legal code of Colorado, United States

- Editor: Revisor of Statutes, Colorado Office of Legislative Legal Services; Colorado General Assembly Committee on Legal Services
- Publisher: LexisNexis
- OCLC: 37599208

The Colorado Revised Statutes (C.R.S.) are a legal code of Colorado, the codified general and permanent statutes of the Colorado General Assembly.

== Publication ==
The Colorado Revised Statutes are revised and published by the Revisor of Statutes of the Colorado Office of Legislative Legal Services under the supervision of the Committee on Legal Services as required by the Colorado Constitution.

The General Assembly has claimed copyright protection of the C.R.S. under the aegis of the Committee on Legal Services since 1970. The assertion has been called "one of the most aggressive state government uses of copyright". Beginning in 1989, West Publishing began its own distribution, challenging the copyright claim as an impermissible copyright of the public domain and as a violation of constitutional freedom of speech, prior restraint prohibitions, and due process. West settled with the state after the law was changed in 1990 to allow access to the legislative database for a large fee. On March 4, 2016, the Committee on Legal Services suspended its practice of copyright registration of the original publications and ancillary editorial work, and also suspended the fee for the statutory database containing the official text of the statutes.

In Georgia v. Public.Resource.Org, Inc. the Supreme Court ruled that official annotated editions of state laws are public domain.

== See also ==
- Law of Colorado
- United States Code
