= Colorado Department of Revenue =

Government agency

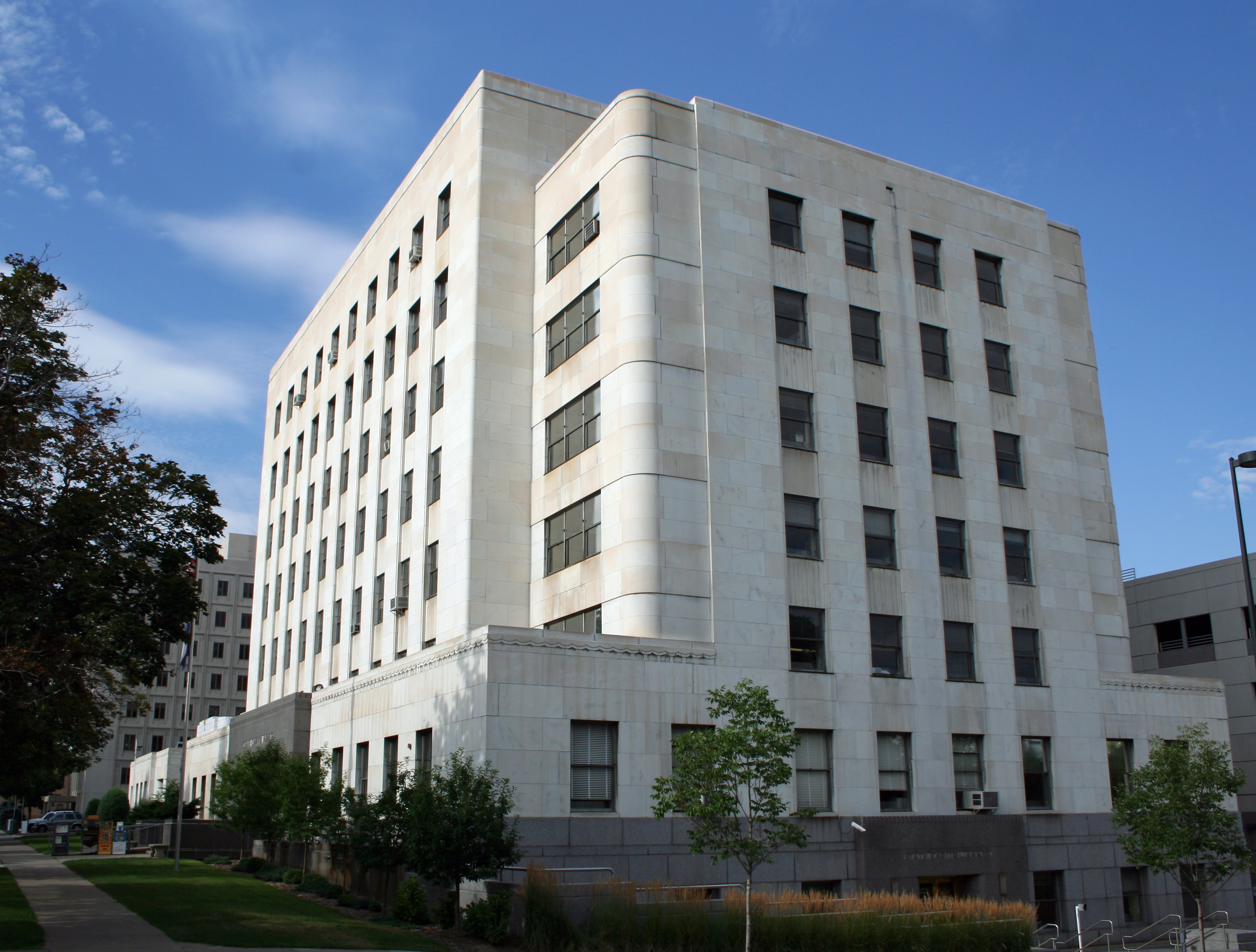
- The State Capitol Annex in Denver

Department overview
- Formed: 1941
- Type: Revenue service
- Jurisdiction: Colorado
- Headquarters: State Capitol Annex 1375 Sherman Street, Denver, Colorado
- Annual budget: $926,000,000
- Department executive: Heidi Humphreys, Executive Director (interim)
- Website: cdor.colorado.gov

The Colorado Department of Revenue (DOR) is a state agency in Colorado. The department collects most types of taxes and issues state identification cards and driver licenses and also enforces Colorado laws regarding gaming, liquor, tobacco, racing, auto dealers, and marijuana.

== Divisions ==
- Taxation Division:

- Division of Motor Vehicles
- Division of Natural Medicine
- Enforcement Division
  - Auto Industry Division
  - Division of Gaming
  - Liquor Enforcement Division
  - Marijuana Enforcement Division
  - Division of Racing
- Colorado Lottery

=== Division of Natural Medicine ===
The Division of Natural Medicine is the government agency responsible for regulating the use of psilocybin in Colorado. The Division of Natural Medicine is part of the Department of Revenue and was created by SB23-290, which implements Proposition 122. Proposition 122 is otherwise known as the Natural Medicine Health Act and passed in 2022. No prescription or referral is necessary to use psilocybin in Colorado. Participants also do not need to be state residents. Participants need to be at least 21 years old. They also need to complete a mental health history with a licensed facilitator. The mental health history screens for a personal or family history of bipolar disorder, schizophrenia, or suicidal thoughts. Those conditions are contraindicated, and an individual cannot use psilocybin if they have a personal or family history of these conditions. The use of psilocybin risks triggering bipolar mania, psychosis, or worsening suicidality. As of 2026, 34 healing centers have been approved in Colorado.

== See also ==
- Colorado Department of the Treasury
- Direct Marketing Ass'n v. Brohl
- Drug policy of Colorado
- Psilocybin decriminalization in the United States
