= Colorado Department of Personnel and Administration =

Principal department of the Colorado state government

Department of Personnel and Administration
- Seal of Colorado

- Headquarters in Denver

Department overview
- Formed: 1970 (Department of Personnel); July 1, 1995 (Department of Administration merged)
- Preceding agencies: Department of Personnel; Department of Administration
- Jurisdiction: State of Colorado
- Headquarters: State Services Building 1525 Sherman Street Denver, Colorado; 39.7394°N 104.9847°W
- Motto: Enabling the success of state government through efficiency, collaboration, and innovation
- Employees: 511.7 FTE (FY 2026-27)
- Annual budget: US$307.8 million (FY 2026-27)
- Department executives: Jana Locke, Executive director and state personnel director; Tobin Follenweider, Deputy executive director of operations; Heather Velasquez, Deputy executive director of administration; Robert Jaros, State controller; Tana M. Lane, State architect
- Parent department: Government of Colorado
- Website: dpa.colorado.gov

The Colorado Department of Personnel and Administration (DPA) is a principal department of the Colorado state government. It administers the statewide classified personnel system and supplies shared administrative infrastructure used by other agencies, including central payroll and the statewide accounting system, procurement rules, self-funded employee benefits, self-insurance for liability, property, and workers' compensation, the Colorado State Capitol complex, the state motor fleet, state archives, the Address Confidentiality Program, and a central panel of administrative law judges. The statutory name of the principal department is the Department of Personnel. "And Administration" is the operating name used after the former Department of Administration was abolished and its functions were transferred in 1995.

The department is headed by the state personnel director, who is also the executive director, appointed by the governor of Colorado with the consent of the Colorado Senate and serving at the governor's pleasure. The incumbent executive director is Jana Locke, who succeeded Tony Gherardini. Governor Jared Polis announced the appointment in April 2026 and stated that Locke would begin on May 18, 2026; the department's executive-director page states that she was appointed in May 2026. Headquarters are in the State Services Building at 1525 Sherman Street in Denver, adjacent to the State Capitol.

DPA's customers are other state departments, the General Assembly, institutions of higher education, some local governments, state employees, and the public. Most of its operating budget is reappropriated from user agencies rather than appropriated as General Fund. For fiscal year 2026-27 the Joint Budget Committee's appropriations report recorded $307,807,236 in total operating appropriations and 511.7 full-time equivalent positions after all 2026 session bills, 0.184 percent of statewide General Fund operating appropriations of $17.461 billion. The department is the custodian of its own Colorado Open Records Act records and has been the subject of repeated Office of the Colorado State Auditor performance audits of the classified personnel system, the Office of Administrative Courts, risk management, and statewide cellphone purchasing.

== History ==
=== Creation and 1995 merger ===
Article XII, section 14 of the Colorado Constitution establishes a state personnel system and a state personnel director. The Administrative Organization Act lists a "department of personnel" among the principal departments of the executive branch and creates it in Colorado Revised Statutes section 24-1-128. Title 24, article 50, of the statutes is the State Personnel System Act.

House Bill 95-1362, enacted as chapter 167 of the 1995 Session Laws, merged the Department of Administration into the Department of Personnel effective July 1, 1995. The Department of Administration was abolished. Its functions, including central services, accounts and control, state buildings, archives, and related support, were transferred to the Department of Personnel. The constitutional and statutory name of the principal department remains Department of Personnel. "Department of Personnel and Administration" is the operating name used in later Long Bills and on the department's website. A 2004 statutory rename (House Bill 04-1373) was contingent on a constitutional amendment (H.C.R. 04-1005) that voters rejected.

Section 24-1-107 authorizes the head of a principal department to rearrange internal divisions, which is why Long Bill subdivision names, SMART Act performance plans, and live websites do not always match a single statutory list.

=== Information systems ===
Statewide accounting before CORE used the Colorado Financial Reporting System (COFRS), in service from fiscal year 1991. The replacement project, later named the Colorado Operations Resource Engine (CORE), is a CGI Advantage enterprise system. The Governor's Office of Information Technology holds the vendor contract; DPA's Office of the State Controller is the business owner. CORE went live on July 1, 2014. A 2013 legislative contract table put CGI Component II (COFRS modernization) at $30,494,986. CGI announced the Colorado and West Virginia go-lives in August 2014, quoting then-executive director Kathy Nesbitt. The Office of the State Auditor's June 2016 CORE security audit and Joint Budget Committee capital figure-setting both treated the statewide go-live as July 2014. In March 2017 CGI announced a Colorado payroll-modernization contract valued at US$66.2 million over 20 years, with optional years. Vendor notification migrated from the Bid Information and Distribution System (BIDS), created in section 24-102-202.5, to the Colorado Vendor Self Service (ColoradoVSS) portal. Paid BIDS access ended in fiscal year 2013-14.

A separate human-resources and payroll modernization known as HRWorks was terminated on May 19, 2020, after about $41.6 million to $43.2 million had been appropriated. A September 14, 2020, DPA briefing to the Joint Technology Committee recorded that vendors had stopped work in February 2019, that the project ended in May 2020 after the FY 2020-21 funding request was eliminated, and that a remaining capital appropriation of about $3.8 million sat against $7.4 million still on the books. The Joint Budget Committee later recorded that the project ended on May 19, 2020, and did not produce a usable HR or payroll system. Central payroll remains a function of the State Controller. Fiscal Rule 9.3 moved executive-branch payroll to a biweekly lag beginning in July 2023.

=== Address Confidentiality Program and administrative courts ===
The Address Confidentiality Program was created by House Bill 07-1350 in the Colorado Secretary of State's office (then sections 24-21-201 and following), with enrollments beginning in July 2008. House Bill 11-1080, chapter 256 of the 2011 Session Laws, transferred the program to DPA effective June 2, 2011. It is now article 30, part 21 of title 24 (sections 24-30-2101 through 24-30-2115).

Senate Bill 05-185 renamed the Division of Administrative Hearings as the Office of Administrative Courts effective July 1, 2005. The office is a type 2 entity under DPA. The statutory head of the office is the DPA executive director, who appoints the chief judge.

Colorado State Archives originated with a state archivist position created in 1943 (Herbert O. Brayer). Archives became independent of the State Historical Society in 1959 and entered DPA through the 1995 merger (section 24-1-128(7)(b); title 24, article 80, part 1). The program has been housed in the Centennial Building at 1313 Sherman Street since 1976. Aly Jabrocki has been state archivist since November 2016.

=== Facilities and fleet reorganizations ===
State buildings functions sit in title 24, article 30, part 13. Senate Bill 13-263 directed a Capitol Complex master plan. In November 2016 DPA moved Capitol Complex facilities management, Capitol Complex architects, and State Fleet Management out of Central Services into a Division of Capital Assets. Senate Bill 22-239 created a Capitol Complex renovation fund in section 24-30-1313, with a statutory repeal date of July 1, 2031. DPA has reported about $91 million encumbered from the fund.

On July 29, 2026, DPA announced that the Division of Capital Assets would be decommissioned on August 1, 2026. State Fleet Management returned to the Division of Central Services. Capitol Complex moved to a Division of State Property. Statewide purchasing is not a DPA "Division of Finance and Procurement"; that former box is obsolete, and the Statewide Procurement and Contracts Office sits in the Office of the State Controller.

Senate Bill 21-055, signed March 21, 2021, repealed Central Collection Services. Agencies collect their own debts under section 24-30-202.4 and Fiscal Rule 10, with a private collection-agency fee cap of 18 percent.

== Leadership ==
The executive director is the state personnel director under article XII, section 14(4) of the state constitution and section 24-50-102. Governor Jared Polis announced that he had appointed Jana Locke, then deputy executive director of the Colorado Department of Public Safety, as DPA executive director. The Governor's office said Locke would begin on May 18, 2026. Polis posted the appointment on April 24, 2026. Locke succeeded Tony Gherardini. The department's executive-director page states that she was appointed in May 2026. The State Claims Board lists Locke as the DPA member.

Locke's DPA biography states that she has worked in Colorado state government for more than 20 years. She joined the Department of Public Safety in 2010 and served as legislative liaison, chief planning and communications officer, and interim deputy executive director before her appointment as CDPS deputy executive director in 2019. From 2007 to 2010 she was a senior management and budget analyst in Governor Bill Ritter's Office of State Planning and Budgeting. She was a Presidential Management Fellow at the United States Department of Justice.

Gherardini's last day at DPA was April 2, 2026. Polis's announcement credited his tenure with skills-based hiring, implementation of a statewide partnership agreement with Colorado WINS, a classified step-pay system, an increase of more than 800 electric vehicles in the state fleet, and a reduction of more than 580,000 square feet in the state's leased and owned footprint, which the release said saved more than $9 million a year in lease and facility costs. Gherardini became vice president and chief human resources officer of the University of Colorado system on April 13, 2026. CU's announcement described DPA under his leadership as a roughly 500-person agency with a $450 million budget supporting more than 30,000 statewide employees. Polis appointed him DPA executive director in November 2021, succeeding Kara Veitch, who had moved to the Governor's Office as chief legal counsel.

Tobin Follenweider is deputy executive director of operations. Heather Velasquez is deputy executive director of administration. Follenweider previously was chief operating and performance officer at the Colorado Department of Natural Resources. Velasquez previously was director of recovery and strategic initiatives and deputy director of operations in the Governor's Office.

Recent executive directors documented in official releases and news accounts include Kathy Nesbitt (appointed January 10, 2011; in office through the 2014 CORE go-live), June Taylor (documented in 2016-2017 under Governor John Hickenlooper), Kara Veitch (appointed February 2019; left September 29, 2021), Tony Gherardini (November 2021 - April 2, 2026), and Jana Locke (from May 18, 2026).

DPA is not the Colorado Department of Law. The attorney general is a separately elected constitutional officer heading a different principal department (section 24-1-113). Attorney General Phil Weiser sits on the State Claims Board by virtue of that office, not as DPA staff.

== Organization ==
The department's published performance plan and division websites, read together with the Long Bill, describe the following boxes as of August 2026. Internal titles can move under section 24-1-107; JBC presentations still used a Division of Capital Assets through the FY 2026-27 briefing cycle, while DPA decommissioned that division on August 1, 2026.

Department units and related entities (2026)
Unit	Head (as published)	Notes
Executive Director's Office	Jana Locke; deputies Tobin Follenweider (operations) and Heather Velasquez (administration)	Department accounting, budget, contracts, communications, and internal human resources. Statutory special-purpose programs attached to the office have included the Office of the State Architect, C-SEAP, the Statewide Equity Office, the Public-Private Partnership unit, and the Office of Sustainability.
Division of Human Resources	Chief human resources officer Laura Koeneman (deputy Jessica Greene)	Classified compensation and benefits, Learning and Development (section 24-50-122), C-SEAP (Janeen Haller-Abernethy), labor relations (Arianne Burger Shapiro), and the Statewide Equity Office, a type 2 entity (section 24-50-146; Rosie McNeil-Cusick).
Division of Central Services	Tom Montross	Integrated Document Solutions, Address Confidentiality Program (Kim Reynolds), Colorado State Archives (Aly Jabrocki), and, from August 1, 2026, State Fleet Management (Scott Edwards).
Division of State Property	Capitol Complex previously under DCA director Richard Lee	Capitol Complex facilities after the August 1, 2026, split. The Office of the State Architect (Tana M. Lane, AIA) and the Public-Private Partnership unit (Thomas Kurek; Senate Bill 22-130) are related state-buildings functions.
Office of the State Controller (Division of Accounts and Control)	Controller Robert "Bob" Jaros; deputy Tammy Nelson	Type 2. Statewide Procurement and Contracts Office (Sherri Maxwell), CORE Operations (Kyle Schlenker), State Office of Risk Management (Julie Mileham), and Financial Analysis and Reporting (Jeffrey Kahn).
Office of Administrative Courts	Chief judge and director Laura Broniak	Type 2. Statutory head is the DPA executive director. Offices in Denver, Colorado Springs, and Grand Junction.
Office of Sustainability	Caitlin Casassa	Created by Senate Bill 24-214; section 24-30-2303.
State Personnel Board	Board director Rick Dindinger	Type 1 and constitutionally independent. Not a DPA division. DPA hosts the website and carries the board's Long Bill appropriation.
State Claims Board	Locke; State Treasurer Dave Young; Attorney General Phil Weiser	Type 1. Staffing contact published on the DPA site is Amy Puchino at the Attorney General's Office.

=== Executive Director's Office ===
The office provides operational management, policy, departmental finance, communications, and legislative relations. JBC briefings treat the Office of the State Architect, C-SEAP, the Statewide Equity Office, and the Public-Private Partnership office as special-purpose units in this subdivision even when program websites sit elsewhere. The Public-Private Partnership Collaboration unit was created in 2022 (title 24, article 94) to review and govern selected public-private projects using unused state-owned real property. The Office of Sustainability, created in 2024, leads Greening Government implementation, metrics, and related grant and electrification work; Senate Bill 25-249 repealed an annual General Fund transfer into the Sustainability Revolving Fund, after which DPA requested replacement staffing and operating money.

=== Division of Human Resources ===
The division maintains classified job evaluation and pay systems, group benefits, leave and ADA guidance, skills-based hiring and work-based learning, mandatory statewide training, labor-management support under the Colorado Partnership for Quality Jobs and Services Act (sections 24-50-1101 through 24-50-1117), and director-level personnel rules (the Administrative Procedures in 4 CCR 801-1). Total Rewards designs medical, dental, life, flexible spending, and wellness plans and runs open enrollment. Learning and Development for the State of Colorado delivers supervisor, leadership, and compliance training under section 24-50-122. The Colorado State Employee Assistance Program provides confidential counseling, mediation, and critical-incident support from offices in Denver, Colorado Springs, and Grand Junction (section 24-50-604(1)(k)). The Statewide Equity Office is a type 2 transfer (section 24-50-146) and includes supplier-diversity work under Senate Bill 22-163.

JBC budget presentations have historically shown workers' compensation, property, and liability appropriations in this division, while DPA's FY 2025-26 performance plan places the State Office of Risk Management inside the Office of the State Controller. The underlying statutes (article 30, part 15) assign the risk system to the department and the executive director.

=== Division of Central Services ===
The division was created in 1976 (sections 24-30-1101 and following) as a type 2 consolidation of printing, document management, mail, graphics, fleet, and similar support, financed through the Department of Personnel Revolving Fund (section 24-30-1108) and the Motor Fleet Management Fund (section 24-30-1115). Travel management left the division in 2012. Capitol Complex and fleet left in 2016 and were partly restored in 2026 as described above.

Integrated Document Solutions is the state's printer and branding shop, with campuses at 1001 East 62nd Avenue in Denver and 2 Jetway Court in Pueblo. Services include graphic design, digital and commercial print, scanning (DCS states capacity of more than 500,000 documents a day), interoffice mail, mail security screening, warehousing, and the Secure Office Print Ecosystem for networked copiers. JBC figure-setting for FY 2025-26 showed 102.6 FTE in IDS personal services, $7,944,686 in FY 2024-25 personal services, $22,770,880 in operating expenses, and $1,733,260 in commercial-print pass-through.

The Address Confidentiality Program issues a legal substitute address and forwards first-class, certified, and registered mail for eligible survivors of stalking, sexual assault, domestic violence, human trafficking, and related crimes, and for certain protected health-care workers and patients. State and local agencies must accept the substitute address (section 24-30-2108). Certification lasts four years and is renewable. DCS reports more than 16,600 people served since July 2008. JBC tables showed 5,550 active participants in FY 2023-24 and a FY 2024-25 appropriation of $739,029 and 7.0 FTE. House Bill 25-1028, which would have modified the program, was postponed indefinitely on March 10, 2025, and did not become law.

State Fleet Management returned to the division on August 1, 2026. DCS describes a fleet of about 6,500 vehicles. Legislative Council Staff, using DPA data as of July 2025, counted 7,303 vehicles across agencies, with the largest inventories in Natural Resources, Public Safety, Corrections, and Transportation. FY 2025-26 vehicle lease payments reappropriated to DPA were $34.4 million. The FY 2024-25 acquisition report recorded 567 purchases, including 151 battery-electric and 48 plug-in hybrid vehicles, a snapshot of 811 electric vehicles and about 733 state-owned charging ports. The downtown motor pool at 1525 Sherman Street publishes daily rates of $45 for sedans and hybrids, $55 for electric and plug-in hybrid vehicles, and $70 for minivans and four-wheel-drive SUVs. JBC staff has cited about 875 collision incidents a year. Higher education may elect exemption from the central fleet; some judicial and legislative vehicles appear in counts even though commuting-assignment rules treat those branches differently.

==== Take-home vehicles (1560P) ====
Section 24-30-1113 lets an agency executive director approve use of a state-owned take-home vehicle for travel between an employee's residence and place of business. DPA writes the fleet rules and is charged with determining that commuting authorizations meet the statutory criteria. A November 2016 OSA performance audit (1560P; letter November 21, 2016) found that those criteria were unclear, that DPA rules did not appear to align with IRS fringe-benefit regulations, and that DPA did not review authorizations or act as a central oversight office. In calendar year 2015 eight agencies had authorized 782 commuters, with another 327 take-home assignments identified later, more than 1,000 employees in all. The auditor estimated commuting cost about $1.54 million that year; employees reimbursed about $15,400. Of a sample of 30 commuters, one file met all statutory requirements. The auditor estimated $1.38 million of the $1.54 million was spent on arrangements that did not meet every statutory criterion. Commute miles totaled more than 5.9 million, about 7,580 per commuter. Agency counts reported in contemporaneous coverage were Corrections 364, Transportation 243, Public Safety 87, Revenue 66, Natural Resources 25, Local Affairs 10, Public Health and Environment 4, and Military and Veterans Affairs 1.

Take-home use is a taxable fringe benefit under IRS rules. The auditor wrote that state requirements and agency controls did not clearly ensure IRS reporting, so the state may not have properly reported vehicle fringe benefits for those 1,000-plus employees, including specific concerns on 327. Two employees may have been underreported by more than $5,000 each in 2015; employees and the state could owe tax and IRS penalties. Of 17 commuters required to reimburse the state that year, 65 percent were not paying the amounts DPA rules required. Collections were about $15,400 of $40,800 owed. The department agreed with all ten recommendations, including statutory-criteria cleanup, an Attorney General/tax-specialist review of IRS reporting and any 2015 W-2 corrections, and setting reimbursement at the IRS commuting-fringe value. The Office of the State Controller later published assigned-authorization and monthly commuting-audit procedures under that statute.

Colorado State Archives collects, preserves, and provides access to historically and legally significant records and sets records-management standards for state and local government.

=== Division of State Property ===
Capitol Complex Facilities Management maintains state properties in the Capitol Complex and selected buildings at Camp George West, in Lakewood, and in Grand Junction. DPA materials describe roughly 1.2 million to 1.3 million square feet under management. JBC figure-setting showed 63.2 FTE and $4,568,546 in FY 2024-25 personal services. A Capitol Complex security line of $637,377 in FY 2024-25 was transferred to the Colorado Department of Public Safety. Armed complex security is a Colorado State Patrol function.

The Ralph L. Carr Colorado Judicial Center is a Judicial Branch facility (Senate Bill 08-206; principal cap $275 million), not a DPA reconstruction project. An arson fire there on January 2, 2024, was investigated by Denver police. Published damage estimates included about $35 million. DPA's documented role was nearby tenant support, including Attorney General mail operations at 1525 Sherman Street, not rebuilding the Carr Center.

=== Office of the State Controller ===
The controller's office (sections 24-30-201 through 24-30-209) is a type 2 entity. It promulgates State Fiscal Rules and procurement rules, produces the Annual Comprehensive Financial Report, runs central payroll for all three branches, operates CORE, administers statewide price agreements, and houses risk management. JBC staff recommended $17,248,420 and 81.6 FTE for Accounts and Control in FY 2025-26.

The Statewide Financial Information Technology Systems cash fund (section 24-30-209) supports CORE billing. The FY 2026-27 Long Bill increased CORE common-policy collections across agencies; JBC common-policy narrative compared about $9.3 million for CORE in FY 2026-27 with about $2.1 million in FY 2025-26.

The Office of the State Auditor's FY 2025 statewide single audit (report 2501F) found that the controller's office missed the August 4, 2025, close; about $22.5 billion posted in CORE after August 8, 2025, and about $24.1 billion posted after close; some year-end payroll posted to the wrong fiscal year; Gravity IT policies were incomplete (material weaknesses); and Integrated Document Solutions issued 23 duplicate warrants totaling about $7,600. Those findings are the auditor's, not adjudicated liability. Related OSA work in the same cycle included a service-disabled veteran-owned small business report (2556P) finding a 3 percent goal against 0.07 to 0.43 percent utilization and CORE overcounts.

==== Cellphone price agreements (2555P) ====
The Statewide Purchasing and Contracts Office inside the controller's office administers NASPO-based state price agreements with Verizon, AT&T, and T-Mobile for cellular devices and service. CORE paid those three vendors $9.3 million in FY 2023, $9.8 million in FY 2024, and $10.5 million in FY 2025. Cellphone service under the agreements generally costs $20 to $50 a month, with the handset typically included. DPA collects a 1 percent administrative fee on reported sales. DPA's own payments to the three carriers were $99,600, $69,600, and $81,500 across those years. Agencies may use other carriers; some rural programs use Viaero. CORE cannot isolate purchases made under a price agreement or split cellphones from tablets, hotspots, trail cameras, traffic signs, and gauges.

A July 2026 performance audit (2555P; transmittal July 23, 2026; released August 10, 2026), requested by a legislator and approved by the Legislative Audit Committee under section 2-3-108, reviewed DPA's vendor reporting and cellphone controls at the five highest-spend departments: Corrections, Human Services, Natural Resources, Public Safety, and Transportation. Those five accounted for about 65 percent of the three-carrier spend and about $6.7 million in FY 2025. The audit found 25 separate cellphone programs, not a statewide inventory. Public Safety paid the three carriers $2.19 million in FY 2025; Transportation $1.54 million; Human Services $1.19 million; Corrections $927,400; Natural Resources $876,800. CDOT had at least 57 Verizon accounts and 10 AT&T accounts. DPS later data showed at least 2,137 phones. None of the five departments produced a complete, reliable inventory. The Office of the State Controller's own cellphone policy requires written approvals before issuance, signed usage agreements, and risk-based usage monitoring; sampled phones were missing those documents. The audit sampled 863 phones (about 10 percent of each department's identifiable set) and stated the sample could not be projected to the population.

From usage data covering 6,688 of the roughly 10,000 phones the five departments identified, 398 phones (6 percent) had no calls, texts, or cellular data in the period examined. The auditor estimated about $173,000 on an annualized basis. Departments said some unused lines were emergency-only, assigned to vacant posts, or cheaper to keep than to pay early-termination fees. The auditor wrote that incomplete records made those explanations unverifiable. Colorado Politics reported the unused-phone figure as nearly $175,000 and quoted audit manager Vickie Heller that phones "may be issued unnecessarily" and that employees "may not understand their responsibilities."

Finding 3 was DPA's. Over FY 2023 through FY 2025 DPA did not receive 1 of 12 quarterly sales reports from AT&T (8 percent) and 8 of 12 from Verizon (67 percent). Verizon produced the eight missing reports in March 2026, after the audit team found they were gone. Itemized Verizon and T-Mobile data omitted sales to whole agencies that used the agreements: Verizon listed no sales to Corrections, Human Services, or DPA, even though Corrections and Human Services each had more than a thousand Verizon phones and DPA more than a hundred. T-Mobile listed no sales to Public Safety or Natural Resources. Verizon's reports put Public Safety at nearly $7.5 million in FY 2025 against $1.7 million in CORE. Both vendors misclassified political subdivisions and nonprofits as state agencies, including the Estes Park Recreation District, Denver International Airport, Ute Mountain Resort and Casino, Longs Peak Water District, Aurora Housing Authority, and Delta County Fire Protection District. Required line-item detail (item name, quantity, price) was replaced by agency totals. DPA staff told auditors they check only whether the 1 percent fee check matches the vendor's reported total, and do not review itemized rows "due to a lack of available staff." The auditor wrote that vendors then have an incentive to underreport sales because the fee is calculated from the report. DPA called the cellphone agreements "some of our biggest and most used state price agreements." Recommendation 11 told DPA to enforce reporting, review completeness, and validate agency accounts with the departments. DPA agreed, with a June 2027 date, and said it would compare carrier reports to CORE and review agencies against the controller's cellphone policy. All 11 recommendations in the report were agreed.

=== Office of the State Architect ===
Section 24-30-1302.5 creates the office. It administers state-funded planning, construction, energy conservation, and real-estate transactions for agencies and institutions of higher education, with statutory exceptions that include Colorado Department of Transportation right-of-way, Parks and Wildlife, the State Land Board, and Judicial property. Emergency controlled-maintenance uses the State Buildings fund above $5,000 (sections 24-30-1303.9(5) and 24-75-302(3.2)). Tana M. Lane, AIA, is the published state architect.

=== Office of Administrative Courts ===
The office is one of about 30 central ALJ panels in the United States. It hears workers' compensation, public-benefits, professional-licensing, child- and adult-abuse registry, special-education, teacher-dismissal, Title IX, PERA, Denver Employees Retirement Plan, and Fair Campaign Practices Act cases, among others. Statute makes the DPA executive director the head of the office and the appointing authority for the chief judge, who is also the office director. The published chief judge and director is Laura Broniak. Offices are in Denver, Colorado Springs, and Grand Junction. Judges are independent of the agencies whose cases they hear and are required by section 24-30-1003 to follow the Colorado Code of Judicial Conduct. They are not within the jurisdiction of the Commission on Judicial Discipline; complaints about ALJs are handled inside OAC, with attorney-regulation overlay. FY 2024 appropriation cited in the 2024 audit was about $8.2 million ($7.9 million reappropriated). The FY 2026-27 Long Bill added term-limited staff for Medicaid eligibility appeals, transferred from the Department of Health Care Policy and Financing. In written answers to the Joint Budget Committee on December 2, 2024, DPA said federal rules give HCPF 90 days from the hearing request for a final agency decision, so OAC must finish the hearing and initial decision in 60 days. Temporary public-health staff had held averages near 37 to 38 days through July 2024. After that staffing fell, DPA reported 62-day averages for September and October 2024 closings, expected turnaround above 78 days for September receipts and 103 days for October receipts, and hearings set 60 to 85 days out rather than the 25 to 35 day target. As of October 31, 2024, HCPF had 1,059 pending cases past the 90-day deadline. For appeals filed June through October 2024, DPA wrote that "approximately 99% of its final agency decisions will exceed the 90-day deadline." Asked whether OAC expected trouble meeting the federal 90-day rule, DPA answered "Yes." New November 2024 hearings were already being set into February 2025.

==== 2024 performance audit ====
Section 8-47-101(3)(d)(II) requires the state auditor to review the ALJs who hear workers' compensation cases. OSA's November 2024 performance audit (2358P; letter November 22, 2024; released December 1, 2024) also ran under the SMART Act. Workers' compensation and Medicaid were more than 80 percent of calendar-year 2023 filings. The office opened 9,274 cases and completed 1,592 hearings that year, with 19 ALJs and 20 support staff as of June 2024. About 70 percent of Medicaid appellants and 10 percent or fewer of workers' compensation appellants appeared without a lawyer. Management estimated 64 percent of 2023 hearings were remote and 36 percent in-person or hybrid. Twelve recommendations were issued; the office agreed to all twelve.

On timeliness, 96 percent of workers' compensation hearings and 94 percent of related orders met statutory deadlines. Medicaid cases met OAC's internal goals in 76 percent of general-population matters and 63 percent of special-population matters. Parties requesting delays were the usual stated cause; the auditor also found inconsistent Salesforce tracking and said some Medicaid goals may be unrealistic given case complexity. Data-reliability tests on 26,675 cases opened in 2021 to 2023 found errors in each year, as high as 11 percent of applicable records in a given test: 1,023 order records (about 2 percent) missing or wrong "ready to issue" dates; 1,720 (about 4 percent) missing or invalid issued-to-parties dates; 2,359 orders (5 percent) missing the ALJ's name; Medicaid dismissals miscoded as bench orders so they dropped out of delay reports; and eight different Salesforce labels for similar evidence-review time. Clerk data-entry guides dated from 2017 and ALJ guides from 2018. Ten of 16 surveyed ALJs called Salesforce unclear. OAC did not itself track how often the Industrial Claim Appeals Office or HCPF's Office of Appeals reversed its orders; the auditor pulled those figures from the other agencies.

Customer-service findings were mixed. Public perception had improved since 2012, and clerks were described as helpful, but the website had contradictory filing instructions, broken links, incomplete phone numbers, and legal language that advocacy groups said they no longer send Medicaid appellants to. OAC had not run a general customer survey in more than five years. Clerks received limited verbal training on public questions and no written desk aid. After Medicaid hearings OAC does not tell the appellant the ALJ decision; HCPF's Office of Appeals sends both the initial OAC order and HCPF's final agency action, which stakeholders said left people unsure which office to call. Virtual trailing dockets were run inconsistently: some ALJs did not tell waiting parties when to rejoin, and auditor connections timed out with no notice whether the hearing had started. Interpretation on a workers' compensation virtual hearing required a second device the party had not been told to have, then switched mid-hearing from simultaneous to consecutive translation.

Of 12 complaints received from September 2022 through March 2024, two files lacked the allegation or OAC's response, and two resolutions were not stored with the complaint. The Director/Chief Judge investigates ALJ complaints; if a Judicial Code violation is found, formal discipline may follow. That in-house path is the public's complaint channel for ALJs who decide workers' compensation, Medicaid, and licensing cases against the same executive branch that employs them.

==== Administrative-law-judge conflicts of interest ====
The 2024 audit's conflict finding is process failure, not a named recusal scandal. Auditors wrote they "did not identify evidence that any ALJs had conflicts of interest" and then documented "inherent risks that ALJs could adjudicate a case while they have a conflict or perceived conflict."

OAC hires ALJs with administrative-law experience. Workers' compensation judges are typically former attorneys from firms that litigated those cases. Supervising ALJs told auditors that conflicts from prior employment are common and that practices for checking assigned cases were inconsistent. Some stakeholders said they perceived bias from ALJs' former and current relationships with the lawyers appearing before them. One stakeholder raised a bias complaint with management; without a documented conflict process the auditor "could not substantiate the merit of the concern" and said OAC would have trouble defending itself on the record.

ALJs are supposed to self-identify professional or social conflicts and recuse if judgment might be impaired, and to list financial interests, outside employment, and gifts on OAC's Judicial Disclosure Form for the Director/Chief Judge to review. Other conflicts may be disclosed to a supervisor or on the record at hearing. Ethics training is every other year. In practice the office relies on ALJs to self-manage. Surveyed ALJs did not agree on the threshold: only 11 of 16 respondents said a financial interest in a party would be a potential conflict they would consider disclosing or that might lead them to recuse. Not all said they would take a potential conflict to a supervisor. Calendar-year 2023 produced three Judicial Disclosure Forms, all from one ALJ. Auditors did not see conflict discussion in the 23 hearings they observed or in sampled case files. They called the procedures insufficient to protect independence and credibility, and recommended a written identification process, updated training on what a conflict is, and consideration of a periodic independence-attestation form. OAC agreed, with a December 2025 date, and said ALJs already must follow Judicial Conduct Rule 2.11; it would write a standard process for applying that rule and cover conflicts at the biennial ethics CLE. That is a self-attestation model inside an office whose statutory head is the DPA executive director.

== State personnel system ==
The classified system covers most executive-branch employees and, with statutory exceptions, classified staff at some institutions of higher education. The DPA executive director is the State Personnel Director. The director writes the Administrative Procedures in 4 CCR 801-1 and administers selection, allocation, performance, and coverage designation (including sections 24-50-112.5 and 24-50-104(6)(b)). The director, not the State Personnel Board, reviews those categories. DPA's FY 2024-25 workforce report, published in May 2026, counted 30,337 classified employees and 115,720 employees in all statuses statewide, with 464 classified employees inside DPA. JBC overviews describe about 35,000 FTE excluding the Department of Higher Education.

The Colorado Partnership for Quality Jobs and Services Act governs labor relations with Colorado WINS for covered classified employees. The State Personnel Director classifies covered employees. Unfair-labor-practice charges are heard by the Division of Labor Standards and Statistics in the Colorado Department of Labor and Employment, not by DPA or the State Personnel Board. Partnership Agreement disputes do not go to the board. The current partnership agreement was signed September 23, 2024, and runs through July 31, 2027.

A Mercer total-compensation survey delivered October 1, 2025, found statewide classified total compensation about 9 percent below market and base pay 9.5 percent below market, and recommended a 3.1 percent cost-of-living adjustment costing $86,371,005 plus $9,086,218 for step pay. The General Assembly did not enact the across-the-board COLA. It enacted a 1 percent range adjustment and continued step pay, as described in a May 22, 2026, compensation memorandum. Step pay, effective July 1, 2024, is a time-in-job-series placement, not a performance rating and not total state service unless the career has been in that series. It is the classified vehicle for pay-equity structure under the Equal Pay for Equal Work Act; CDLE, not DPA, enforces that act against private employers.

From July 1, 2002, until step pay, classified movement through ranges used a performance-rated pot (later recast as merit pay by House Bill 12-1321). The Colorado State Patrol Association, citing DPA's FY 2002-03 annual report, wrote that the first-year pot was about $9 million, just over 60 percent of the roughly $15 million that had funded automatic anniversary increases, and called the two-decade regime an "unmitigated disaster." Governor Bill Ritter vetoed House Bill 10-1409, which would have restored twelve incremental rates per range; the veto message called existing progression "broken" but objected to a rigid twelve-step default. Step pay returned through the Colorado WINS partnership agreement rather than that 2010 bill.

=== State Personnel Board ===
The board is created by article XII, section 14. It is a five-member type 1 entity: three members appointed by the governor and two elected by classified employees. It sits under DPA only for organizational-chart and appropriation purposes (section 24-50-103(2)) and is constitutionally independent. In Spahn v. State Department of Personnel, 615 P.2d 66 (Colo. App. 1980), the Colorado Court of Appeals treated the board's independence as a constitutional constraint on the department. The board writes the Board Rules in 4 CCR 801-1 covering grievances, appeals, hearings, and standardization. Reversal of an appointing authority or of the director requires three of five members to find the action arbitrary, capricious, or contrary to rule or law; review is not de novo (Department of Corrections v. Stiles, 2020 CO 90).

Mandatory board hearings cover discipline and actions affecting pay, status, or tenure (section 24-50-125). Discretionary review within 120 days can include Colorado Anti-Discrimination Act claims, whistleblower claims, grievance defects, post-director comparative analysis, and the director's overall administration. The State Employee Protection Act (title 24, article 50.5) places whistleblower complaints at the board, not in DPA management. Board statistics for FY 2024-25 reported 36 whistleblower complaints, 4 hearings, and 0 initial decisions finding a violation. Rule 8-21 was amended March 17, 2026, with an effective date around May 15, 2026. The Department of Law represents agencies before the board and also supplies board counsel (published as Assistant Attorney General Jenna Anderson). That litigation role is separate from the State Claims Board.

=== 2013 personnel-system audit ===
Section 24-50-103.5(2) requires the state auditor to examine the Division of Human Resources' and the State Personnel Board's management of the classified system every four years. The May 2013 performance audit (report 2192) found that both needed to improve oversight. The department and the board agreed with the recommendations.

The division's electronic performance-review system did not match agency hard-copy files for 12 of 14 sampled employees. Between 4 percent and 8 percent of classified employees had no record of a required performance review in 2011 and/or 2012. The division was built around consulting, not proactive compliance monitoring. Key workforce databases were still unreliable, a finding repeated from the 2009 audit; the division had not developed human-resources metrics or trained agencies to use them. Most agencies ran their own HR shops; as of May 2013 only Treasury and State used DPA for day-to-day personnel work.

Director-level appeals (reallocations, examinations, performance evaluations, and overall administration of the system) are supposed to be decided in 90 days. If the deadline is missed, personnel rules automatically uphold the agency action. For FY 2011 and 2012 the auditor could not tell whether 201 of 370 appeals (54 percent) met the deadline because the decision date was missing or was recorded as the later file-close date. Of the 169 that could be measured, three missed 90 days and the agency won by default. One overtime-pay complainant filed a second appeal on a new occurrence of the same issue; the division never entered it, never investigated it, and issued a letter that omitted it. The "final decision" field was blank on 309 of 370 records. Five appeals were coded as closed in 1999. Staff used hard-copy tracking sheets. The auditor wrote that missed 90-day clocks mean improper agency actions can go unreviewed and affect other employees and applicants.

The board had replaced its 2009-criticized case system with Legal Files in July 2010, adapted from OAC's system. For 7 of 175 FY 2012 cases that continued past filing (4 percent), hearing dates or other key data were wrong or missing; one case was entered twice. The system had no field for the date the employee received the agency notice, so the statutory 10-day filing clock was checked by hand. Staff could not produce reliable reports; they gave the auditor dates from the wrong case on four matters. FY 2012: 270 filings, 137 approved for hearing, 8 ALJ opinions (about 6 percent), because most cases settled, withdrew, or were dismissed first. Two of those eight ALJ decisions were appealed to the five-member board.

==== Board conflicts of interest (2009 and 2013) ====
The 2009 audit had already told the board to write conflict rules, train, and require annual disclosures. Implementation was due January 2010. In 2013 the auditor found the recommendation still open. Members, ALJs, and staff completed disclosure and compliance forms in 2009 around the prior audit, skipped 2010 and 2011 except for one new ALJ and one new member, and signed again in August 2012 after the 2013 audit had started. Forms asked for potential and real conflicts, not apparent conflicts, even though the Code of Judicial Conduct and article 18 of title 24 require avoiding the appearance of impropriety. The Attorney General's November 2009 memo was advisory; it suggested a cooling-off period for members who had worked at an agency and the board never set one. No conflicts training after November 2009 except for new members. Disclosed conflicts were not shared with other members. The Colorado Court of Appeals had already treated board members as acting in a quasi-judicial capacity and, in 2003, reversed a board decision because a member had a conflict with an attorney on the case and did not recuse. The auditor wrote that without annual disclosures and a written recusal policy, a real or apparent conflict could taint a hearing and expose the decision to reversal. Constitutional Amendment S (2012) shortened board terms from five years to three and capped members at two terms, which the auditor said would increase turnover and make written rules more important. Recommendation 6 told the board to adopt a written policy covering apparent, potential, and real conflicts for members, ALJs, and staff; require annual signed statements; and train, with reminders at every board meeting. The board agreed in March to June 2013, said a policy and new form were approved in March 2013, and promised a second form in each monthly packet plus counsel or director reminders at meetings.

== Employee benefits ==
Section 24-50-604(1)(l) authorizes the State Personnel Director to self-fund group benefits. The Group Benefits Plan Reserve Fund is created in section 24-50-613. The plan year runs July 1 through June 30. The FY 2025 Annual Comprehensive Financial Report described Cigna self-funded PPO options, fully insured Kaiser HMOs, specific stop-loss of $500,000 per person, and $8.0 million recovered from stop-loss. Statewide health, life, and dental appropriations in the common-policy tables were $471,211,267 for FY 2025-26, with an executive request of $557,286,165 for FY 2026-27. Group Benefits Plan Reserve Fund expenses were $720,261,511 in FY 2024-25. The fiscal year-end fund balance was $20,944,647, below a 7.5 percent paid-claims target of $36,384,231. JBC compensation staff's September 22, 2025, interim wrote that the reserve would have dropped by nearly $60 million from the end of FY 2023-24 through the FY 2025-26 projection, that "it is clear to see in this table when the fund started to nosedive out of balance," and that the fund "essentially cannot have a negative fund balance." Staff projected a FY 2025-26 year-end deficit of $10,475,353. DPA requested $17,678,148 in overexpenditure authority ($9,801,682 General Fund), including a 1 percent buffer, and told staff there was "a moderate to high risk that actual expenditures will exceed projections by more than 1.0%." When the committee grandfathered existing GLP-1 anti-obesity prescriptions and told the fund to absorb the cost, the actuarial estimate was about $9.1 million; new prescriptions rose 30 percent and staff later put that decision at $23.9 million. Of a $26 million reserve drop in FY 2024-25, GLP-1 costs were $11.1 million above projection and other claims $11.4 million above; $3.8 million was unexplained. January actuals were 11.4 percent for fully insured Kaiser and 23.5 percent for self-funded Cigna. Compensation staff later recommended an Office of the State Auditor performance audit of DPA's health, life, and dental administration "as soon as possible," writing that the problems "appear to be tied to decisions about coverage under the authority of the Department." Staff also recommended cutting DPA's own health-life-dental General Fund template 16.8 percent because the department had underexpended that line by a 21.8 percent three-year average. Those figures are fund-status estimates, not enacted Long Bill totals for DPA's own operating budget.

The PERAPlus 457 deferred-compensation plan transferred out of DPA on July 1, 2009 (Senate Bill 09-066; section 24-51-1601) and is not a current DPA program. C-SEAP remains in DPA.

== Risk management ==
Part 15 of article 30, title 24, creates the state's risk-management system. The State Office of Risk Management (SORM) buys excess insurance, handles claims, and provides loss control for participating agencies. It is not the Colorado Department of Labor and Employment private-employer workers' compensation or self-insurance permit program, and it is not the Division of Insurance. Legal defense of claims may be provided by the Department of Law under section 24-30-1507. Broadspire is the published third-party administrator for state-employee workers' compensation claims.

SORM is housed in the Office of the State Controller, whose statutory job is statewide fiscal rules, CORE, payroll, and the Annual Comprehensive Financial Report. The FY 2025-26 SMART Act plan lists SORM under the controller with Julie Mileham as state risk management director. Joint Budget Committee staff have historically shown the workers' compensation, property, and liability common policies in the Division of Human Resources. The Risk Management Act assigns the system to the department and the executive director, not to the controller as a separate insurer. That placement puts a claims-paying and workplace-safety office inside the state's bookkeeping function: the same controller's office the FY 2025 statewide single audit cited for a missed CORE close and material IT-control weaknesses. The Colorado Department of Labor and Employment Division of Workers' Compensation remains the regulator of the Workers' Compensation Act; SORM is the state's self-insured employer-insurer for its own workforce.

=== 2010 performance evaluation ===
Section 24-30-1513 requires the state auditor to examine the risk-management system. In September 2010 the Office of the State Auditor issued a contracted performance evaluation of the Office of Risk Management (then in the Division of Human Resources) prepared by Bickmore Risk Services (report 2061). The evaluation is the last comprehensive published examination of how the office finances risk, controls loss, pays claims, and oversees vendors. It is not a financial-statement opinion. The contractors reported deficiencies they treated as serious enough to recommend eight corrective actions, all of which the office agreed to implement, some subject to resources and agency cooperation.

From FY 2005 through FY 2009 the state's measured "cost of risk" (premiums, retained losses, and administration, including legal fees) rose from $49 million to $55 million, about 12 percent. Self-retained losses were $44 million in FY 2009, 80 percent of that total, which the evaluators called variable costs that sound loss control could reduce. The office had not done a formal evaluation of how much risk the state should retain versus transfer. Property values had not been appraised in more than ten years. Crime coverage of $5 million sat below an $11 million Department of Revenue embezzlement in FY 2007. Workers' compensation excess limits of $25 million were called insufficient for a catastrophic event at a large facility; the contractors recommended considering at least $50 million. There was no excess liability policy wrapping around the Colorado Governmental Immunity Act for federal-law and out-of-state claims, which the report said could produce multi-million-dollar uninsured losses. Property cost was allocated by building values only, so high-loss agencies were subsidized by low-loss ones; applying loss experience would have nearly doubled the Colorado Department of Transportation share and cut the higher-education share by about 44 percent.

On workplace safety the contractors wrote that the office needed to "establish a culture of safety," that preventable employee injuries and "higher than warranted loss rates" would continue without a technically qualified loss-control lead, and that "without a strong loss control program ... the risks to state employee health and safety increase." A 2004 risk-management audit had already recommended a loss-control grant program and measurable safety performance objectives; neither had been implemented by 2010. Accident-investigation oversight was weak. Departments were not given workers' compensation loss-control results, incentives, or accountability measures. Pinnacol Assurance, then the workers' compensation third-party administrator, was not being required to furnish the monthly loss-prevention reports by department that the state needed to steer agency safety work. Marsh was not delivering a contract-required annual stewardship report.

On claims, the office processed about 3,360 workers' compensation claims a year from FY 2005 through FY 2009, plus about 1,210 liability and 115 property claims. Sample scoring against Insurance Institute of America-style best practices was high in investigation, but the report still found missing written procedures for claim-note updates, reserve re-estimates, payment coding, and delegated settlement authority. Internal-control findings included segregation-of-duties gaps and a recommendation to audit claims paid between September 2009 and April 2010. The State Risk Manager and Assistant Claims Manager carried caseloads the contractors called too high for supervision. The STARS information system did not reliably carry complete workers' compensation notes from Pinnacol, double-counted some reserve take-downs, and could not track property deductibles without a spreadsheet.

On litigation the contractors wrote that the office "lacks adequate procedures for managing litigation claims, which may be contributing to increases in the State's litigation costs." Liability procedures did not set litigation-expense authority or require a cost-benefit choice between trying a case and settling it. The Attorney General's staff managed litigation expenses. The ratio of litigation expenses to total payments on litigated cases was 75 percent in FY 2009, up from 42 percent in FY 2005, and averaged about 43 percent over five years, a level the evaluators called high and attributed largely to federal liability cases. Subrogation procedures were deficient in workers' compensation, property, and liability, so recoveries that could offset benefits paid to injured employees (for example from an at-fault driver) were at risk of being missed. The report's claims-processing description included "rejecting invalid claims and paying valid claims" as core functions; the recommended cure was written litigation plans, settlement-value review inside the risk office, and criteria for using outside counsel, not an instruction to contest every claim.

Fourteen years later, DPA's December 2024 Joint Budget Committee packet said property valuations had "not been assessed for more than 20 years" (the 2010 contractors had already said more than ten), that annual broker inflation updates "do not constitute actual replacement cost valuations," and that without current appraisals insurers would cover only the statement of values. The same packet said SORM had "paid over $9M in cyber related claims with no recovery from insurance, since no individual case exceeded the $5M retention," that wind and hail deductibles had moved from a flat $1 million to 3 percent of a location's total insured value, and that "future liability exposure may be less predictable, as the state no longer has excess liability insurance." In December 2025 DPA attributed a 10 percent rise in open workers' compensation inventory in part to Senate Bill 24-149, which barred making a ban on future state employment a settlement condition, produced "approximately 246 demands for settlement," and "results in claims staying open longer and potential repeat filing." DPA also told the committee that if one risk fund is projected to end the year insolvent, statute lets the department transfer among workers' compensation, property, and liability.

=== Workers' compensation costs and employee effects ===
The state-employee workers' compensation account is a self-insured pool. Injured employees deal with SORM and its third-party administrator (Pinnacol in 2010; Broadspire as of the OSC website), not with a licensed carrier whose rates the Division of Insurance reviews each year. That structure means cost pressure shows up as higher assessments on agencies, legal-defense spending inside the common policy, and the claims practices applied to state workers, rather than as a published NCCI experience mod for the State of Colorado as a named insured.

Commercial workers' compensation in Colorado has moved in the opposite direction from the state's self-insured common policy. The Division of Insurance, using National Council on Compensation Insurance filings, approved a 4.3 percent decrease in average voluntary-market loss costs for 2025, the eleventh consecutive year without an increase and a 53.5 percent cumulative decline over 11 years, and NCCI later proposed a further 6.9 percent decrease effective January 1, 2026 (a twelfth year of decline and about 56.8 percent since 2015). Commissioners attributed those cuts to fewer injuries and lower industry loss costs. NCCI's 2024 countrywide combined ratio for workers' compensation was about 86 percent, an underwriting gain, not a hard market.

The state's pool did not follow that path. JBC common-policy tables show workers' compensation program cost of $36,013,804 in FY 2023-24, $36,311,219 in FY 2024-25, $36,999,061 in FY 2025-26, and a FY 2026-27 request of $40,862,438. After fund-balance adjustments, allocable cost billed to agencies was $27,920,253, $34,445,429, $34,344,366, and a requested $44,153,165. The enacted FY 2026-27 Long Bill common-policy total for workers' compensation was about $44.7 million, compared with about $34.5 million in FY 2025-26, an increase of roughly 29 percent in one year while voluntary-market loss costs were cut. Inside the request, claims were $33,962,814, third-party administrator and loss-control fees $2,078,480, excess coverage $1,327,310, and legal services $2,223,344 (legal services had been $1,356,445 in FY 2023-24 and $1,929,105 in FY 2025-26).

Those legal-services dollars are the state's cost of defending and contesting workers' compensation matters, billed through the Department of Law into the DPA common policy. The 2010 evaluation already flagged missing cost-benefit tests before litigating and a high litigation-expense ratio on the liability side; it scored workers' compensation litigation-management files in its sample as meeting its checklist while still calling subrogation and loss-control failures a direct risk to injured employees. Later JBC hearings treat the workers' compensation line as driven by a three-year actuarial look at actual losses by department, not by NCCI loss costs. The result, as published, is that classified state employees are covered by a pool whose billed cost has risen while Colorado's insured private employers have seen more than a decade of falling loss costs, and that a growing legal-services appropriation sits inside the same assessment. The 2010 contractors tied weak loss control to preventable injuries; they did not publish a current denial-rate or "litigate the margins" statistic, and no later Office of the State Auditor report in the sources used here supplies a statewide SORM win-loss rate. What the figures do show is more money leaving the pool for lawyers at the same time employees face a self-insured administrator whose statutory job includes denying claims the state deems invalid.

=== SORM staff ===
The Office of the State Controller's staff directory, as of August 2026, listed the following SORM positions. The Director accordion did not name an incumbent on that page; the department's FY 2025-26 performance plan names Julie Mileham as state risk management director. The Liability Claims Manager slot was published as "Coming Soon."

State Office of Risk Management staff (OSC directory)
Position	Name (as published)
State risk management director	Julie Mileham (SMART Act plan; not named on the OSC staff accordion)
Liability claims manager	Vacant ("Coming Soon")
Liability claims administrator	Eileen "Lee" Taylor (SORM since 2016; directory describes litigation management and high-value claims)
Workers' compensation manager	Donna Goodwin (joined July 2020; previously ran CDOT's self-insured workers' compensation program)
Property insurance and safety administrator	Adam Alban (joined 2018)
Lead safety specialist	Brian Brickey (joined 2017)
Technical assistant (liability)	Priscilla Talich
Origami / RMIS administrator	Corey Riley (joined 2018)

Colorado Governmental Immunity Act caps applicable to many state tort claims were $505,000 per person and $1,421,000 per occurrence as of January 1, 2026, under section 24-10-114 as adjusted.

=== Risk funds ===
Statute splits state self-insurance into three pots. Section 24-30-1511.5 authorizes transfers among self-insurance funds and is not itself a property-insurance fund.

- The Risk Management Fund (section 24-30-1510) pays liability claims and related expenses against the state, its officials, or employees under the Colorado Governmental Immunity Act or federal law, including compromised or settled claims. It must hold reserves for incurred but unpaid claims. The executive director is charged with efficient operation of the fund.
- The Self-Insured Property Fund (section 24-30-1510.5) pays loss or damage to state property and must hold reserves for incurred but unpaid property claims.
- The State Employee Workers' Compensation Account (sections 24-30-1510.3 and 24-30-1510.7) is the state-employee workers' compensation pool, distinct from CDLE regulation of private self-insured employers. Section 24-30-1510.7 creates the account inside the Risk Management Fund. Section 24-30-1510.3 directs actuarially based assessments of higher-education risk for both that account and the Risk Management Fund.

JBC staff's FY 2026-27 operating common-policies briefing tabulated workers' compensation program costs of $36,999,061 for FY 2025-26 (allocable $34,344,366 after a fund-balance adjustment) and liability-plus-property program costs of $55,977,714 (allocable $66,521,194 after a $10.5 million fund-balance add). The briefing projected $12.9 million in property claims payouts for FY 2025-26. The FY 2026-27 Long Bill narrative table listed statewide common-policy appropriations of $44,668,243 for workers' compensation and $40,959,945 for risk management and property. The appropriations report compared the workers' compensation total of about $44.7 million with $34.5 million in FY 2025-26, and described the risk/property total as $41.0 million, including $25.9 million for property and $15.1 million for liability. Section 24-30-1513 requires the state auditor to examine the risk funds.

=== State Claims Board ===
Section 24-30-1508 creates a three-member type 1 State Claims Board: the DPA executive director, the state treasurer, and the attorney general. The board may request help from the commissioner of insurance. It oversees the Risk Management Fund. DPA schedules regular meetings in March, June, September, and December, held virtually, with a notice of public hearing posted one week in advance at the Secretary of State, DPA, Treasury, and Attorney General. As of 2026 the published members were Jana Locke, Treasurer Dave Young, and Attorney General Phil Weiser.

Section 24-30-1515 sets a settlement ladder. Department claims adjusters may settle up to $5,000; the claims manager up to $25,000; the state risk manager up to $50,000; the executive director up to $100,000; and the board from $100,000 up to the Colorado Governmental Immunity Act caps. The board is authorized to settle federal-law claims without that CGIA cap (section 24-30-1515(2)(b)). Settlements above $50,000 require consultation with the affected agency head. The State Administrative Procedure Act does not apply to these settlements.

Attributed board outcomes reported in reliable sources include a $25.1 million General Fund appropriation in FY 2013-14 related to the Lower North Fork wildfire claims, and an $8 million settlement approved September 20, 2023, in the federal civil-rights case of former inmate Christopher Tanner against the Department of Corrections, which Westword described as among the largest Colorado custodial medical-care settlements.

== Budget and staffing ==
DPA is funded almost entirely from General Fund, cash funds, and reappropriated funds; federal funds are $0 in the operating tables below. Reappropriated funds are payments from other agencies for fleet, print, risk, CORE, administrative-law, and similar common policies. The Joint Budget Committee's FY 2026-27 appropriations report is the source for enacted totals after all 2026 session bills. H.B. 26-1410 (Sirota/Bridges) is the FY 2026-27 Long Bill. The prior-year Long Bill was S.B. 25-206.

Department of Personnel operating appropriations
Fiscal year	Total funds	General Fund	Cash funds	Reappropriated funds	FTE
FY 2024-25 final	$285,346,531	$40,047,001	$24,388,762	$220,910,768	518.3
FY 2025-26 after 2025 session (JBC briefing)	$302,610,382	$35,163,407	$27,286,866	$240,160,109	495.9
FY 2025-26 after H.B. 26-1164 and H.B. 26-1410 add-on	$301,468,382	$34,305,753	$27,190,601	$239,972,028	500.5
FY 2026-27 H.B. 26-1410 Part XVI only	$310,373,150	$34,708,991	$39,254,079	$236,410,080	511.2
FY 2026-27 all bills	$307,807,236	$32,143,077	$39,254,079	$236,410,080	511.7

The FY 2025-26 all-bills total is 0.632 percent of statewide operating appropriations of $47.669 billion and 0.200 percent of statewide General Fund of $17.176 billion. The FY 2026-27 all-bills total is 0.620 percent of $49.694 billion statewide and 0.184 percent of $17.461 billion General Fund. About 77 percent of FY 2026-27 departmental funding is reappropriated. The executive FY 2026-27 request of $312.5 million and 521.8 FTE was not the enacted figure.

H.B. 26-1164, signed March 12, 2026, reduced FY 2025-26 authority by $490,721 total funds and added 4.6 FTE. A Long Bill add-on in H.B. 26-1410 cut $651,279 General Fund that had been appropriated to terminate a Higher Education private lease and was unused. Other 2026 bills netted -$2,565,914 against the Part XVI Long Bill subtotal, including H.B. 26-1406 (repeal of a capital funding requirement, -$2,600,060 General Fund).

Common-policy items that DPA administers for all agencies in FY 2026-27 include workers' compensation ($44.7 million statewide), Capitol Complex leased space, CORE, and fleet replacement of 545 vehicles (326 anticipated hybrid or electric). DPA's own Vehicle Replacement Lease/Purchase line is $40.1 million reappropriated.

=== Joint Budget Committee record ===
JBC staff briefings and hearings are the public record of what DPA asked for, what staff recommended, and what the department told the committee. Operating common policies (risk, fleet, CORE, ALJ, Capitol Complex, print) have averaged about 78.5 percent of DPA's budget over ten years. Risk and fleet together are about 67 percent of those common policies. JBC tables still parked workers' compensation, property, and liability in the Division of Human Resources and fleet in Capital Assets after DPA's own SMART Act plan and the August 2026 reorganization put those boxes elsewhere.

The executive FY 2026-27 request was $312.5 million and 521.8 FTE, up 3.3 percent from the FY 2025-26 appropriation of $302.6 million. Enacted after all 2026 bills was $307.8 million and 511.7 FTE. Request items included $1.12 million and 9.0 FTE for a payroll-system common policy; $722,970 and 6.2 FTE for OAC Medicaid staff; $836,049 and 3.9 FTE for CORE; $605,398 General Fund for the Office of Sustainability after Senate Bill 25-249 repealed the $400,000 annual General Fund transfer into the Sustainability Revolving Fund; $3.71 million to true-up print; $714,370 General Fund to keep Cornerstone (34,000 LMS licenses at $541,780, an "Elite Customer Success Package" at $153,480, and 3,000 content licenses, against about 1,000 current users); $1.70 million General Fund and about 3 FTE for a COWINS housing-pilot and CSEAP grants, including $10,000 down-payment grants for 30 to 50 employees; and $3.87 million reappropriated for 545 fleet replacements, winnowed from 1,263 CARS candidates. Offsets included cutting Statewide Planning Services again and eliminating the remaining $175,000 Equity Consultant line created by Senate Bill 22-163 after stakeholder work ended in FY 2023-24.

CORE Operations allocable cost in the common-policy table was $8.75 million in FY 2023-24, $2.50 million in FY 2024-25, $2.12 million in FY 2025-26, and a $9.58 million request for FY 2026-27, a 353.1 percent one-year jump. The drop had been fund-balance subsidies of $6.8 million to $10.6 million; those credits shrank to $3.22 million in the request year, so agencies would pay the full run-rate. The FY 2026-27 Long Bill still raised CORE collections to about $9.3 million.

OAC allocable cost rose 63.1 percent in FY 2025-26, to $11.32 million, including $3.38 million of one-time IT capital, then the request fell 44.6 percent to $6.27 million once that capital dropped out. A December 2, 2024, JBC hearing put OAC staffing as decision item R1.

JBC common-policy actuals for risk, which DPA billed to every agency, showed workers' compensation claims and excess of $30.7 million in FY 2021-22 and $34.6 million in FY 2024-25; property policies, deductibles, and payouts of $13.1 million then $36.2 million; and liability claims and excess of $6.4 million, $18.9 million, $35.1 million, then $8.3 million. Total risk actuals were $60.1 million, $81.3 million, $106.5 million, and $93.0 million. The FY 2023-24 spike was a $33.4 million mid-year supplemental for larger-than-expected liability payouts. Property payouts nearly doubled the next year; JBC staff attributed extensive damage at the Ralph L. Carr Judicial Center. Legal services inside those programs were $7.04 million in FY 2021-22 and $10.32 million in FY 2024-25: workers' compensation legal $1.22 million to $2.02 million, liability legal $5.83 million to $8.30 million. Request-year legal services were $2.22 million on workers' compensation and $8.96 million on liability. C-SEAP, the employee assistance program, is billed through the liability and property common policy ($2.92 million in the FY 2026-27 request). Risk appropriations grew at a 5.1 percent compound annual rate over ten years, about $4.0 million a year. Fleet lease-payment appropriations grew at 6.5 percent, about $1.7 million a year. Public Safety's vehicle-lease line in the request was $16.2 million; Natural Resources $7.86 million; Corrections $5.46 million.

Capitol Complex leased-space allocable cost was $17.2 million requested for FY 2026-27 at $13.95 per square foot on average, $19.73 downtown Denver. Security in that pool rose from $589,345 in FY 2023-24 to $826,076. A December 2024 hearing also listed the Supplier Database Cash Fund as a budget-reduction option, vacancy savings, contracted staff, and Address Confidentiality Program resources.

Written hearing packets are DPA's own answers. At the December 8, 2023, hearing the department said CPPS still paid more than 33,000 employees and that the Executive Director's Office "currently has an employee out on FMLA due to stress induced illness" in central payroll. Two years later, on December 18, 2025, DPA told Sen. Jeff Bridges and Rep. Kyle Brown that one of four planned CORE Payroll mock conversions was done, four parallel tests were "currently planned but not started," and "Go live is being evaluated for spring 2026 but is dependent on the results of forthcoming testing." Asked for a return on investment, DPA wrote that it was "difficult to fully quantify" until further testing.

JBC compensation staff put FY 2026-27 health, life, and dental at an $86.1 million (18.3 percent) jump to $557.3 million, larger than the usual 7 to 10 percent, after a Group Benefits Fund solvency issue, a GLP-1 grandfather of about $9.0 million the committee had told DPA to absorb from that fund, and the Partnership's 100 percent absorption of premium increases through June 30, 2028. DPA told the committee that anti-obesity GLP-1 cost per member per month rose from $0.39 at the end of FY 2022-23 to $44.30 by the end of FY 2024-25, that "There are no indications that AOMs will result in any significant plan savings, at least in the immediate term," and that it "intends to continue offering coverage" anyway. Additional drivers DPA listed were "reduction in stop loss reimbursement," high-cost claims, and a "partial rebuild of premium stabilization reserve." An executive one-time cut of the Unfunded Liability Amortization Equalization Disbursement rate from 10 percent to 9 percent, with "no plan to repay," was scored by JBC staff as about $30.3 million left uncontributed in 2026, growing to about $143.7 million by 2048 at a 7 percent return if PERA's 2048 path is held.

On housing, JBC staff wrote that "The State does not currently have data on the need for housing assistance among State employees" and was "skeptical" of the $1.7 million pilot. DPA said a 2022 internal survey found 28 percent of respondents knew CSEAP emergency grants existed and "less than 1 percent reported ever using the program"; average award was $270. Asked what data supported three extra CSEAP counselors, DPA told Rep. Scott Taggart: "This request did not analyze data, and is in response to perceptions on behalf of COWINS." First counseling waits were up to 30 days, mediation 61 days, facilitation 86 days.

Address Confidentiality Program VOCA awards were falling (national VOCA $56.7 million in 2018 to $18.2 million in 2021). DPA said personnel funding would run out at the end of September 2025 and operating at the end of December 2025, and that judges can remove or reduce the $26.60 surcharge, with FY 2023-24 collections of $157,208. Archives told the committee it "does not track customer satisfaction formally" while waits missed goals on 15.19 percent of FY 2023-24 requests, including incorporation records at 96 business hours. Bond Assistance, launched April 2024, had issued its first and only bond, $94,124.63, to a service-disabled veteran-owned firm. Of 10.0 FTE funded for the Colorado Equity Office inside DPA, "The funding in the Colorado Equity Office bill was sufficient to hire 6 FTE." Capitol Complex parking: 885 employee spaces, $135 covered and $120 uncovered, wait list of 377. Burnham Yard had spent $3.6 million of $14 million after four years; sale proceeds would repay Colorado Transportation Investment Office debt, not the General Fund. DPA opposed cutting controller ARPA compliance staff before April 30, 2027, writing that a reduction "would jeopardize the entire $3.8 billion awarded."

Across the 2023 through 2025 hearings DPA also told the committee that ARPA-funded employees shifting to permanent status "are not centrally tracked at a statewide level"; that "The State does not track contracted employee usage"; that vacancy-savings uses at other agencies were not tracked; that it "does not have visibility into sources of funds used to pay for non-common policy services such as IDS and fleet repair/maintenance"; and that skills-based hiring was still "establishing metrics."

After inflation, DPA General Fund had risen 92.0 percent since FY 2018-19, against a statewide General Fund increase of 13.6 percent. Staff attributed the growth to new FY 2022-23 line items (Equity Office, Procurement Equity, tuition reimbursement, labor relations), one-time transfers, and rising common-policy bills. The department's own FY 2026-27 General Fund offsets were $491,580, or 1.4 percent of its General Fund. JBC staff later wrote that CORE Payroll "was born from the failure of the HRWorks project" and that more than $50 million had been appropriated since FY 2022-23 to build CORE Payroll after that termination, on top of the $41.6 million to $43.2 million already spent on HRWorks. An $11.4 million CORE Upgrade certificate of participation, dated December 15, 2023, still had $8.9 million outstanding through 2031, payable from the statewide IT systems fund and/or the Supplier Database Cash Fund. After OSA found that fund over the 16.5 percent reserve cap for three consecutive years, OSPB and DPA asked in 2025 to delay fee-cut duties until two consecutive noncompliant years. Staff recommended the inflation adjustment and denied the delay, writing that "that compliance is difficult is not a reason to change statute."

Staff recommended denial of several DPA asks. The $1.7 million housing pilot was set at $0; staff was "skeptical of the need" and noted CDOT already spent about $9.1 million a year on housing stipends after studying vacancy rates, work DPA had not done. House Bill 25-1153's $100,000 language-access assessment sat unspent; DPA and the Office of New Americans then asked for statewide implementation money before the assessment, and "the Governor's Office did not share the Universal Policy with JBC staff." Cornerstone licenses had been bought with one-time professional-development cash after the committee denied a $15 million request that staff said lacked "thorough scoping"; DPA then asked $714,370 General Fund to renew 34,000 licenses. Staff assumed DPA knew the renewal cost when it spent $2.1 million of one-time money and recommended denial of General Fund. DPA did not give staff the per-agency user counts it asked for. Statewide Planning Services reverted $869,530 of $1.0 million in FY 2022-23 and $1,336,358 against a $1.45 million appropriation in FY 2023-24, then was cut to $7,811. The State Procurement Equity Program reverted $889,099 of $931,521 in its first year. Bond Assistance still held about $1.83 million after one award. Senate Bill 21-288's $14.0 million ARPA for Burnham Yard still had $10.4 million unencumbered with "no contractor or vendor yet" in staff's write-up. A $651,279 General Fund lease-termination buyout sat unused after CDHE reevaluated workspace needs.

For FY 2025-26 DPA asked spending authority to collect restitution on fleet crashes, asserting about $250,000 a year at risk. Staff recorded 875 collision incidents a year and 141 open cases from three years, then denied the collection request because "the Department was unable to provide assumptions and calculations underpinning both the assertion of loss and requested spending authority." Electrification replacements, staff wrote, were still chosen "based solely on a vehicle's model availability in the marketplace, rather than an analysis of whether or not the vehicle is a good fit for electrification." In November 2023, before the mid-year risk supplemental, staff reported that the liability program was projected to end FY 2023-24 with a $23.8 million deficit from unplanned liability and cybersecurity losses; the later common-policy briefing recorded a $33.4 million mid-year adjustment.

JBC compensation staff wrote that an across-the-board percentage "favors salary increases for the highest paid employees" and is "not a particularly good, 'bang for the buck' investment," and that applying a statewide structural adjustment to every class, including those already above market, reflected "bureaucratic inertia." The Partnership priced a 3.1 percent July 1, 2026, increase at $100.4 million. The enacted Long Bill did not include that COLA.

== Colorado Open Records Act ==
Colorado Open Records Act requests for DPA-held records are governed by sections 24-72-200.1 through 24-72-206. The department's published policy applies to all DPA divisions; the State Personnel Board says it follows the same policy but runs its own requests. The policy is not a substitute for the statute. Other agencies may use different procedures.

=== Portal-only intake and the three-day clock ===
DPA requires every request to be filed through an online Monday.com form. The department's CORA page publishes a departmental inbox for help accessing the form. If a request is sent to an individual staff mailbox, the recipient is instructed to tell the requester that the request will not be processed until it is resubmitted through the portal, and to copy the CORA inbox. Those bounce messages are kept under DPA's email-retention policy. Alternative intake is limited to accommodation cases; even then the same processing rules apply. Only the Open Records Request Liaison answers, unless the executive director authorizes someone else for "extraordinary circumstances."

The statutory three-working-day response under section 24-72-203(3)(b) does not start on the calendar day the public files. It starts the first working day after the portal (or an approved alternate) receives the request. Anything received after 12:00 p.m., or on a day DPA is officially closed, is treated as received the next working day. The policy's own example is an email at 12:09 p.m. Monday, counted as received Tuesday, due close of business Friday. A Saturday letter is counted as received Monday and due Thursday. Extenuating circumstances, as defined in the statute, add up to seven more working days. Federal Freedom of Information Act labels are converted to CORA and handled under state law.

Requests for State Personnel Board records filed with DPA are bounced to the Board Director. The policy does not apply to Office of Administrative Courts, State Personnel Board, or State Archives "regular work that is not governed by CORA (i.e., court documents or historical records)." When DPA is not the custodian it sends a formal written notice and, when it can, names the correct custodian.

=== Format, databases, inspection, and fees ===
Section 24-72-201 opens public records to inspection except as provided in part 2 or as otherwise specifically provided by law. Section 24-72-203(3.5) requires a digital copy of a digitally stored record in a searchable or sortable format matching how it is stored, and forbids converting a digital record into a non-searchable format before transmission, with listed exceptions. DPA's policy states that CORA does not guarantee a specific format. If production in a requested format would interfere with regular duties or "levy an undue burden," the liaison picks the format. Electronic records "may be produced electronically at the Department's discretion; this may or may not mean records are provided in their native format." The published policy is to issue PDFs "whenever possible so as to maintain the integrity of the record to the highest degree possible." The public and press may be limited to copies rather than originals if the custodian decides originals would interfere with work or "jeopardize the condition of the records." In-person inspection, when electronic production is not "easily or cost-effectively" available, is 9 a.m. to 4 p.m. Monday through Friday. A former misdemeanor penalty in section 24-72-206 was repealed in 2017.

DPA "manages multiple extremely large databases that contain private information." Its policy is to query those databases for the public information requested rather than provide the database. The statute does not require creation of a new record; the department "may choose to do so rather than provide access to the entire database."

Section 24-72-205 allows up to $0.25 per standard page, forbids a per-page fee for digital copies, and caps research-and-retrieval after the first free hour at a CPI-adjusted maximum that Legislative Council Staff posted at $41.37 per hour effective July 1, 2024. After the statutory response window the custodian must notify the requester that a copy is available but will be sent once the custodian receives payment or makes arrangements for receiving payment. DPA's published policy charges copying and staff time when a request takes more than one hour, $0.25 a page after 25 paper pages, no per-page fee for digital, and $41.37 an hour after the first hour. When it expects more than 25 pages or more than one hour, it issues an estimate; "such costs shall be paid in full before the production of records," with a later true-up and refund. Employees may not modify, redact, or omit records they send the liaison except as permitted or required by law; the liaison, not program staff, decides what is exempt.

== Oversight and reporting ==
The department submits SMART Act performance plans under section 2-7-203. Plans and annual reports are posted by the Governor's Office of Operations. The Joint Budget Committee staffs the Long Bill and takes DPA testimony each briefing cycle. The Office of the State Auditor audits the Annual Comprehensive Financial Report, conducts the section 24-30-1513 risk-fund examination, and publishes performance audits of DPA programs, including the 2010 risk-management evaluation, the 2013 personnel-system audit, the 2016 take-home vehicle audit, the 2024 Office of Administrative Courts audit, the FY 2025 statewide single audit, and the 2026 cellphone-cost audit. DHR publishes a workforce report. The State Claims Board posts agendas.

Section 24-75-402 caps uncommitted reserves in most fee-supported cash funds at 16.5 percent of the prior year's expenditures. After three consecutive noncompliant years the state controller must restrict spending authority. DPA's recurring finding is the Supplier Database Cash Fund (section 24-102-202.5), which collects vendor registration fees and a 1 percent quarterly payment on statewide price-agreement sales, the same fee mechanism the 2026 cellphone audit said DPA was not verifying against itemized carrier reports. OSA's FY 2022 cash-funds audit listed DPA among nine departments over the cap; Colorado Politics reported the supplier fund had then been over for three consecutive years, that the controller was restricting spending authority, and that the fund had been out of compliance in 10 of the prior 20 years. Statewide excess across 18 funds was $16.4 million. Unused fee revenue can affect whether the state owes TABOR refunds. Later tables showed the fund compliant in FY 2023 and FY 2024, then $3,210,517 over the cap as of June 30, 2025 (report 2554P), the eleventh noncompliant year since 2003. Because 2023 and 2024 were compliant, the three-year controller restriction did not automatically reattach in 2025.

A May 2002 performance audit of the statewide procurement-card program, then in DPA's Division of Finance and Procurement (report 1385), found that only about 50 percent of small purchases used the cards and estimated about $5 million in operating-cost savings in FY 2000 if cards had been used for eligible purchases of $3,000 or less. The report also flagged weak monitoring of unauthorized or inappropriate transactions. An August 2003 follow-up found four of seven 2002 recommendations only partly implemented and three not implemented.

== See also ==
- Government of Colorado
- Governor of Colorado
- Colorado State Capitol
- Colorado Department of Law
- Attorney General of Colorado
- Colorado Department of Labor and Employment
- Colorado Governmental Immunity Act
- Colorado Open Records Act
- Office of the Colorado State Auditor
