= Colorado Division of Housing =

Colorado State Agency

Agency overview
- Formed: 1970
- Jurisdiction: Government of Colorado
- Employees: 28
- Annual budget: $58 m USD (2024)
- Agency executives: Alison George, Division Director; Maulid (Mo) Miskell, Deputy Director; Dianne Brown, Executive Assistant; Randi Johnson-Hufford, Director of Operations
- Parent department: Colorado Department of Local Affairs
- Child agencies: Office of Housing Recovery; Office of Housing Finance & Sustainability; Office of Homeless Initiatives; Office of Rental Assistance; Office of Regulatory Oversight
- Website: https://doh.colorado.gov/

The Colorado Division of Housing is a State Agency for the state of Colorado. This agency is a child agency to the Colorado Department of Local Affairs in Colorado. The Colorado Division of Housing has child agencies of its own: the Office of Housing Recovery, Office of Housing Finance & Sustainability, Office of Homeless Initiatives, Office of Rental Assistance and the Office of Regulatory Oversight. The Colorado Division of Housing, as its name suggests, is in authority of the housing in Colorado.

== History ==
In 1970 the Department of Local Affairs sought the creation of the Colorado Division of Housing, successfully doing so. This newly formed agency was placed in charge of housing, mainly known for its attempts to deal with homelessness. This agency would form several offices to help deal with specific areas the division deals with. This division is also notable for findings one of the most recent being the Affordable Housing Investment Fund (2024). The Department of Local Affairs (DOLA) has been heavily funding the Colorado Division of Housing.

== See also ==
- Government of Colorado
- Colorado Department of Local Affairs
