= Colorado Department of Early Childhood =

Department of the Colorado state government

Department of Early Childhood
Department overview
- Formed: July 1, 2022
- Jurisdiction: Colorado
- Department executive: Lisa Roy, Executive Director
- Website: cdec.colorado.gov

The Colorado Department of Early Childhood (CDEC) aims to provide services to young children, families with young children, and professionals who work with young children. The department is charged with implementing tuition-free preschool for children in the year before they enter kindergarten throughout Colorado in the fall of 2023.

== Structure ==
CDEC is a principal department of the Colorado state government. The department includes the following boards, commissions, and committees:

- Safe Child Care Task Force
- Less than 24-Hour Child Care Licensing Appeals and Waiver Review Panel
- Colorado Child Abuse Prevention Trust Fund
- Colorado Interagency Coordinating Council
- Early Childhood Leadership Commission
- Early Childhood Sub-PAC

== History ==
The department began operating on July 1, 2022. It was formed from the Office of Early Childhood in the Colorado Department of Human Services.
