= Straitjacket =

Garment used for restraining people

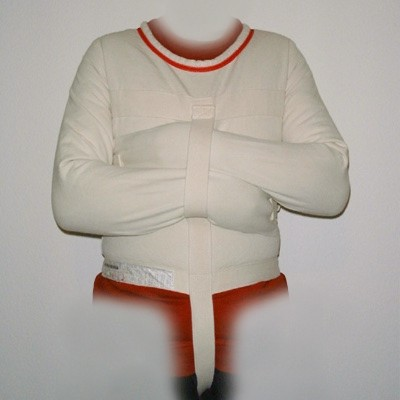
A Posey Straitjacket (small-size) manufactured by The Posey Company.

A straitjacket is a garment that restrains its wearer. Invented in the 18th century, it was originally designed to prevent patients in psychiatric asylums from harming themselves or others, though it was misused as a punishment against patients and prison inmates.

Straitjackets are still used in prisons. The WRAP has been compared to the straitjacket and is used by US authorities, including by Immigration and Customs Enforcement and in juvenile detention centres. Straitjackets are also used in escapology shows.

== History ==
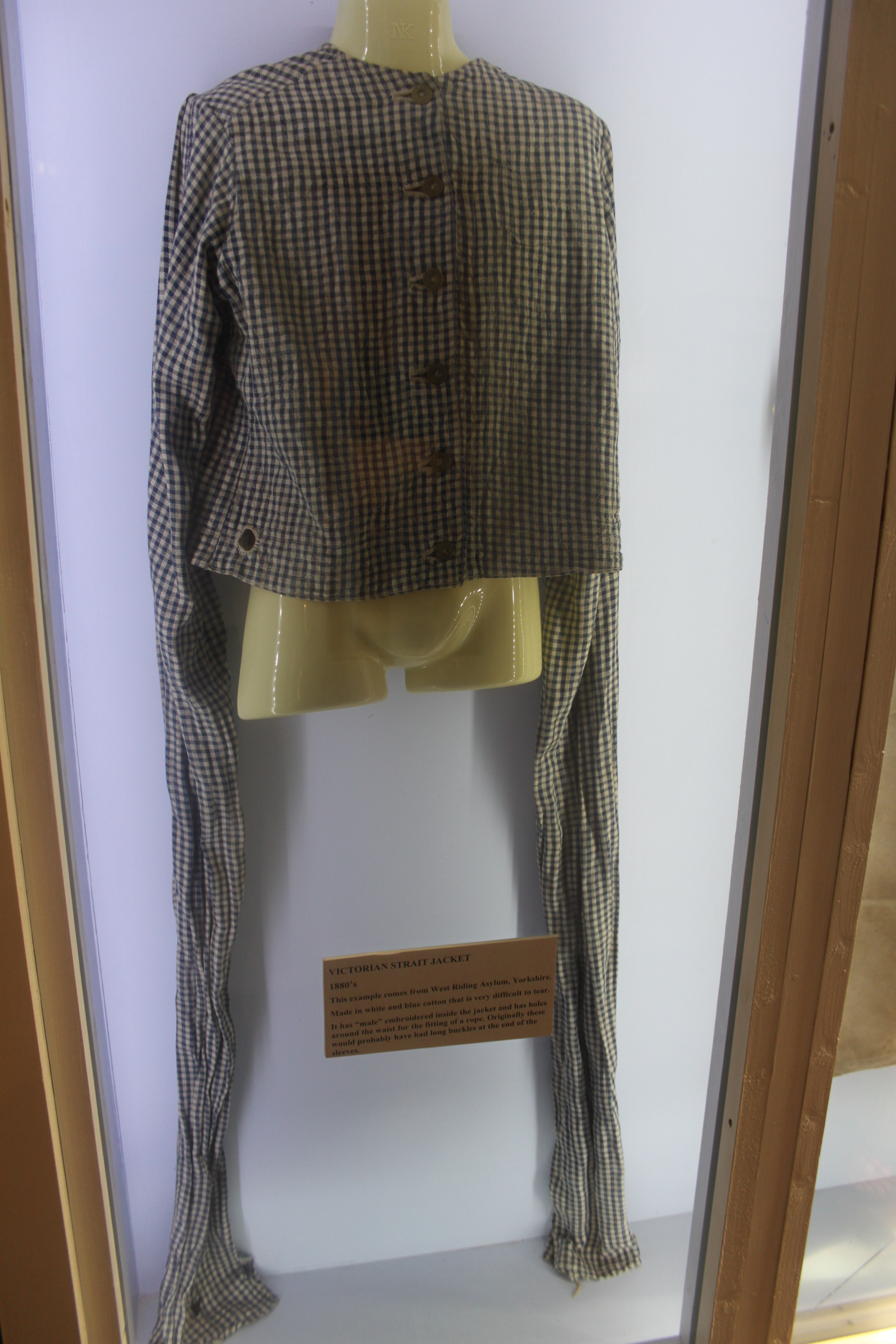
Victorian straitjacket on display at Glenside Museum

The straitjacket was invented in approximately 1770 in France. Scholars such as Michel Foucault claimed that the first straitjacket was created by an upholsterer named Guilleret for the Bicêtre Hospital in Paris, though Benoît Majerus expressed doubt about the authenticity of this. During this early period, the straitjacket was also referred to as a "camisole" or "strait waistcoat", and in 19th century Germany it was called the "Spanish straitjacket". In this context, the word "strait" referred to the garment's "tightly drawn" nature.

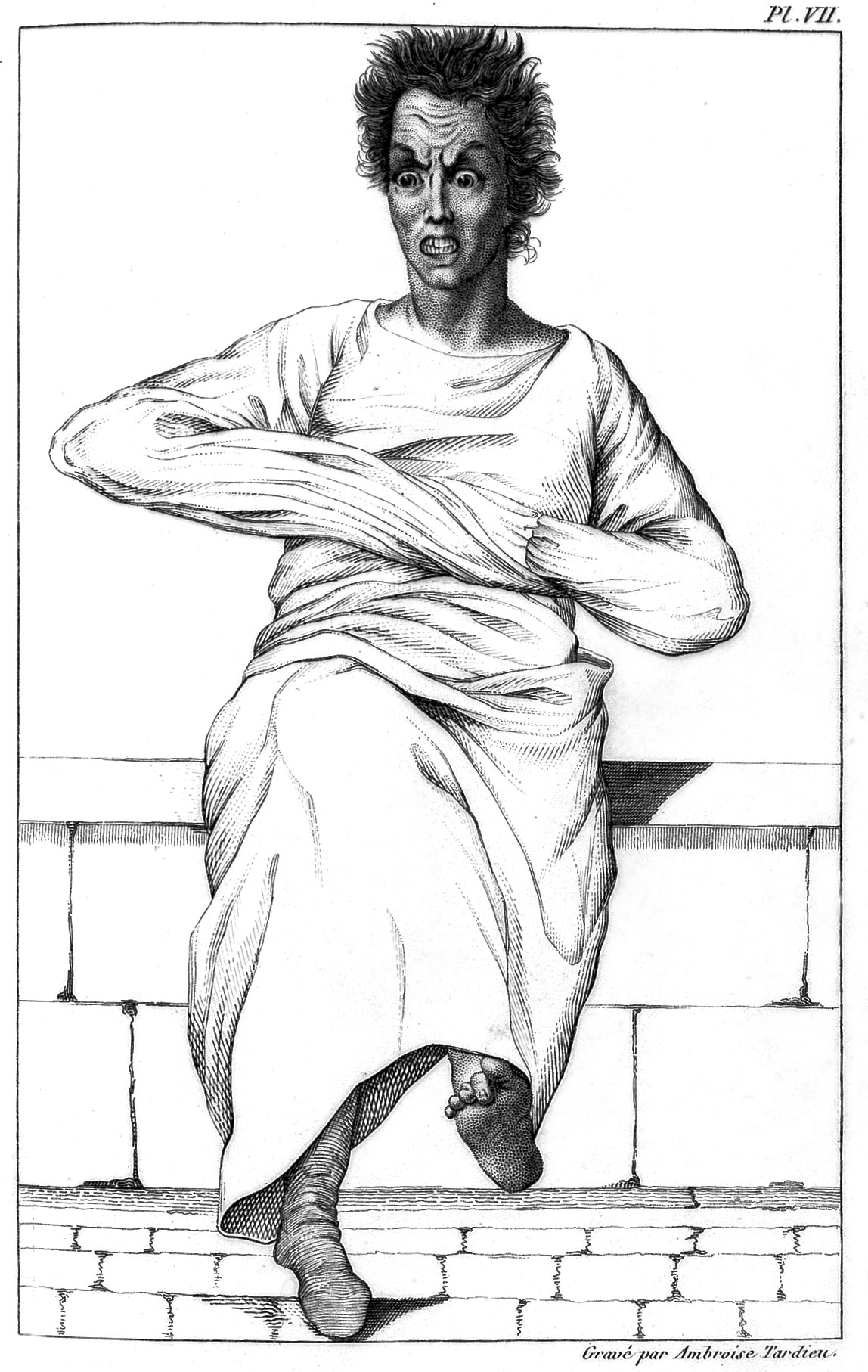
An 1838 depiction of a patient restrained with a straitjacket.

The straitjacket was designed to restrain inmates at psychiatric asylums. Intended as a "humane" alternative to metal restraints like chains and shackles, they would provide wearers with a greater degree of mobility while preventing them from harming themselves or others. Patients were also restrained with straitjackets to make them easier to manage by staff.

Early straitjackets were typically closed at the back by buttons and strings, and had long sleeves that were tied around the back of the wearer. Some straitjackets covered the head, restrained the legs or were constructed to secure the wearer to a bed. Institutions such as the Eastern Oregon State Hospital in Pendleton sewed their own straitjackets. Early straitjackets were made of canvas and occasionally leather. According to Majerus, the softness of the fabrics meant that straitjackets were more often used on women than men. Research by Elizabeth Willis found that a straitjacket that originated from Beechworth Asylum's Female Ward 2 (now kept in the Museum of Victoria's collections) had been modified for the comfort of the patient it restrained: "Someone—we do not know who—has sewn a roll of stockingette [sic] around the collar of the straitjacket, to prevent the rough canvas chafing the neck of the wearer."

Despite its popular consideration as humane, straitjackets were misused. Over time, asylums filled with patients and lacked adequate staff to provide proper care. The attendants were often ill-trained to work with the mentally ill and resorted to restraints to maintain order and calm. During the late nineteenth and early twentieth centuries, some prisons even used straitjackets to punish or torture inmates. In this period, Folsom State Prison and San Quentin State Prison were notorious for their use of the straitjacket on inmates. When 15-year-old Edward Andrews died in Birmingham Prison in 1853, authorities ruled that he had committed suicide having "been driven to despair at being punished" with the straitjacket.

== Modern usage ==
According to a spokesperson, most straitjackets produced by the company Humane Restraint (based in Wauakee, Wisconsin) are used in prisons. In August 2019, Lucas Vieira died while restrained in a straitjacket in Essex County Jail, New Jersey. According to county officials, the death was suicide. An attorney representing Vierira's estate stated that it was not known how he was able to commit suicide while restrained in the straitjacket. Valmir Xhemajili was beaten by sheriff's officers at the Bergen County Jail after he refused to wear a straitjacket in October 2021; the subsequent court case found that it was "unnecessary" for Xhemajili to be restrained with a straitjacket.

Accused individuals have also appeared in court wearing straitjackets. Victoria Afet was wheeled into court in April 2021, restrained in a full-body straitjacket, during which she yelled she was unable to breathe.

=== The WRAP ===
More than 1,500 authorities in the US use a restraining device that has been compared to the straitjacket called the WRAP. It was first introduced by law enforcement in the late 1990s and was introduced as an alternative to the hogtie restraint. The WRAP is sold in adult and juvenile sizes.

The WRAP can make breathing difficult for the wearer and increase feelings of anxiety. Analysing 10 lawsuits related to deaths of people who died in police custody while restrained in the WRAP, Capital & Main found they either stopped breathing or had a cardiac arrest while wearing the WRAP. Investigations found that, in 12 fatal incidents where the WRAP was used, the associated autopsy reports listed "restraint" as a contributing factor to the deaths. The Institute for the Prevention of In-Custody Deaths claimed the WRAP was "safe and 100% effective".

==== Use by US Immigration and Customs Enforcement ====
The WRAP is used by US Immigration and Customs Enforcement (ICE). As of February 2026, ICE has spent approximately $268,000 on WRAP restraints, which it uses in the detention and transportation of immigrants. Five West African men deported to Ghana said that they had been "straitjacketed" during the flight.

In February 2026, Delia Ramirez introduced the Full Body Restraint Prohibition Act, which seeks to ban agencies within the US Department of Homeland Security from buying and using the WRAP.

==== Use in juvenile detention centres ====
In 2014, it was found that the Yell County Juvenile Detention Center was using the WRAP to restrain young people for hours at a time. In 2017, investigations revealed that the WRAP had been used on young people in the custody of the Colorado Division of Youth Services 253 times across a 13 month period; over half of the young people interviewed in the Colorado Child Safety Coalition's report claimed to have been restrained with the WRAP.

== Escapology ==
After seeing a patient restrained with a straitjacket in an asylum in Canada, Harry Houdini introduced the straitjacket to his escapology performances. He would often escape from straitjackets while suspended upside down. In 1916, approximately 50,000 spectators gathered in Baltimore to watch Houdini escape from a straitjacket; it took him three minutes to free himself. This act has been recreated by numerous escapologists since.

As of 10 June 2016, Lucas Wilson from Toronto currently holds four Guinness World Records related to straitjacket escapology: he has performed the most straitjacket escapes in one hour (98 escapes), the fastest underwater straitjacket escape (22.86 seconds), and the fastest suspended straitjacket escape without chains (8.4 seconds), and the fastest suspended straitjacket escape with chains (10.6 seconds).
