= Colorado Department of Local Affairs =

Department of the Colorado state government

Department of Local Affairs
Department overview
- Jurisdiction: Colorado
- Department executives: Maria de Cambra, Executive Director; Dionne Stroter, Deputy Director
- Website: colorado.gov/dola

The Colorado Department of Local Affairs (DOLA) is the principal department of the Colorado state government responsible for local government assistance, property taxation, property assessment appeals, affordable housing, and housing construction regulation.

== Structure ==
DOLA is composed of 4 divisions:

Board of Assessment Appeals

- Hears appeals filed by real and personal property owners regarding property tax assessments.

Division of Housing

- Provides state and federal funding to private housing developers, housing authorities and local governments to increase the inventory of affordable housing.
- Offers Section 8 rental assistance statewide through local housing authorities and non-profit service organizations.
- Certifies all factory/manufactured structures built in or shipped to Colorado.
- Approves multifamily construction in counties with no construction codes.

Division of Local Government

- Provides technical assistance and information to local governments on available federal and state programs
- Acts as a liaison with other state agencies concerned with local governments.
- Performs research on local government issues.

Division of Property Taxation

- Coordinates and administers the implementation of property tax law throughout the 64 counties.
- Operates under the leadership of the property tax administrator, who is appointed by the Colorado State Board of Equalization.
