= Colorado Department of Health Care Policy and Financing =

Department of the Colorado state government

Department of Health Care Policy and Financing
Department overview
- Jurisdiction: Colorado
- Department executive: Vacant, Executive Director
- Website: hcpf.colorado.gov

The Colorado Department of Health Care Policy and Financing (HCPF) is the principal department of the Colorado state government responsible for administering the Health First Colorado (Medicaid) and Child Health Plan Plus programs as well as a variety of other programs for Colorado's low-income families, the elderly, and persons with disabilities.
