= Government of Colorado =

Governmental structure as established by the Constitution of the State of Colorado

- Logo of the Colorado government Great Seal of the State of Colorado
- Part of: United States of America
- Constitution: Constitution of Colorado

Legislative branch
- Name: Legislature
- Type: Bicameral
- Meeting place: Colorado State Capitol
- Upper house
- Name: Senate
- Presiding officer: James Coleman, President
- Lower house
- Name: House of Representatives
- Presiding officer: Julie McCluskie, Speaker

Executive branch
- Head of state and government
- Title: Governor
- Currently: Jared Polis
- Appointer: Election
- Cabinet
- Name: Cabinet
- Leader: Governor
- Deputy leader: Lieutenant Governor
- Headquarters: State Capitol

Judicial branch
- Name: Judiciary of Colorado
- Courts: Courts of Colorado
- Supreme Court of Colorado
- Chief judge: Monica Márquez
- Seat: Denver

The government of the State of Colorado is organized into three branches: the executive branch headed by the Governor, the legislative branch consisting of the General Assembly, and the judicial branch consisting of the Supreme Court and lower courts. This government was created by the Constitution of the State of Colorado, and allows for direct participation of the electorate by initiative, referendum, recall and ratification.

== Executive ==
=== Statewide elected officials ===
The five statewide elected officers are:

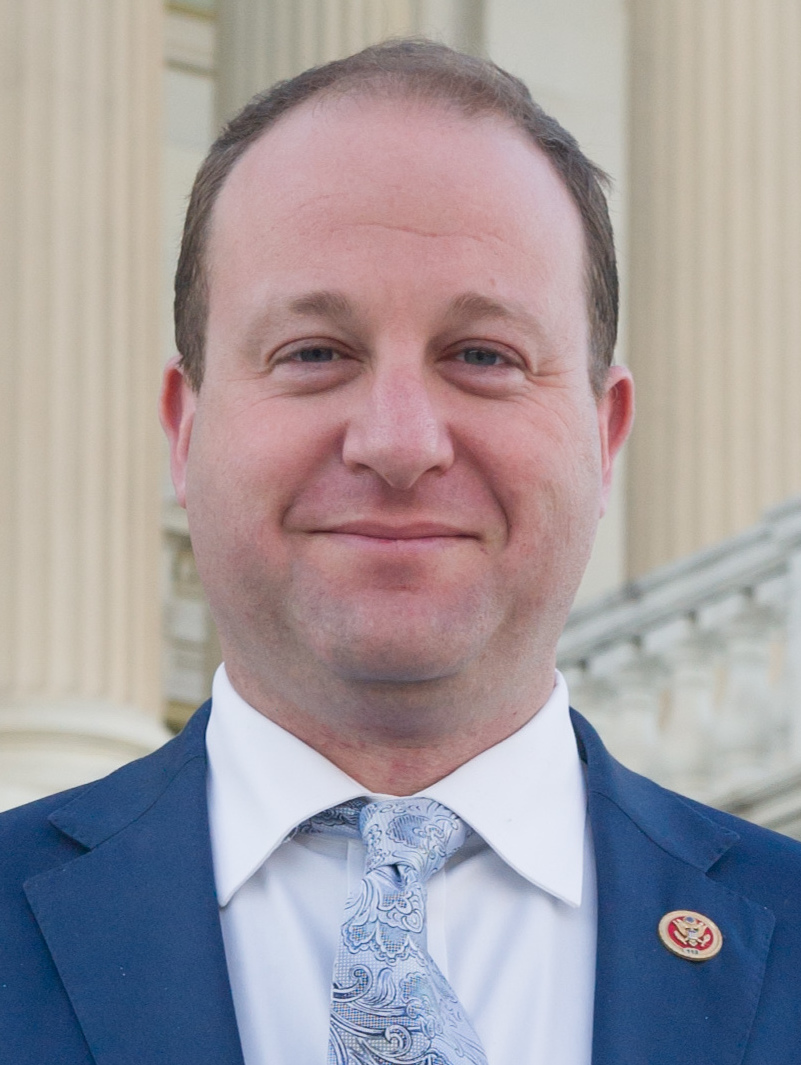
Jared Polis (D)
Governor

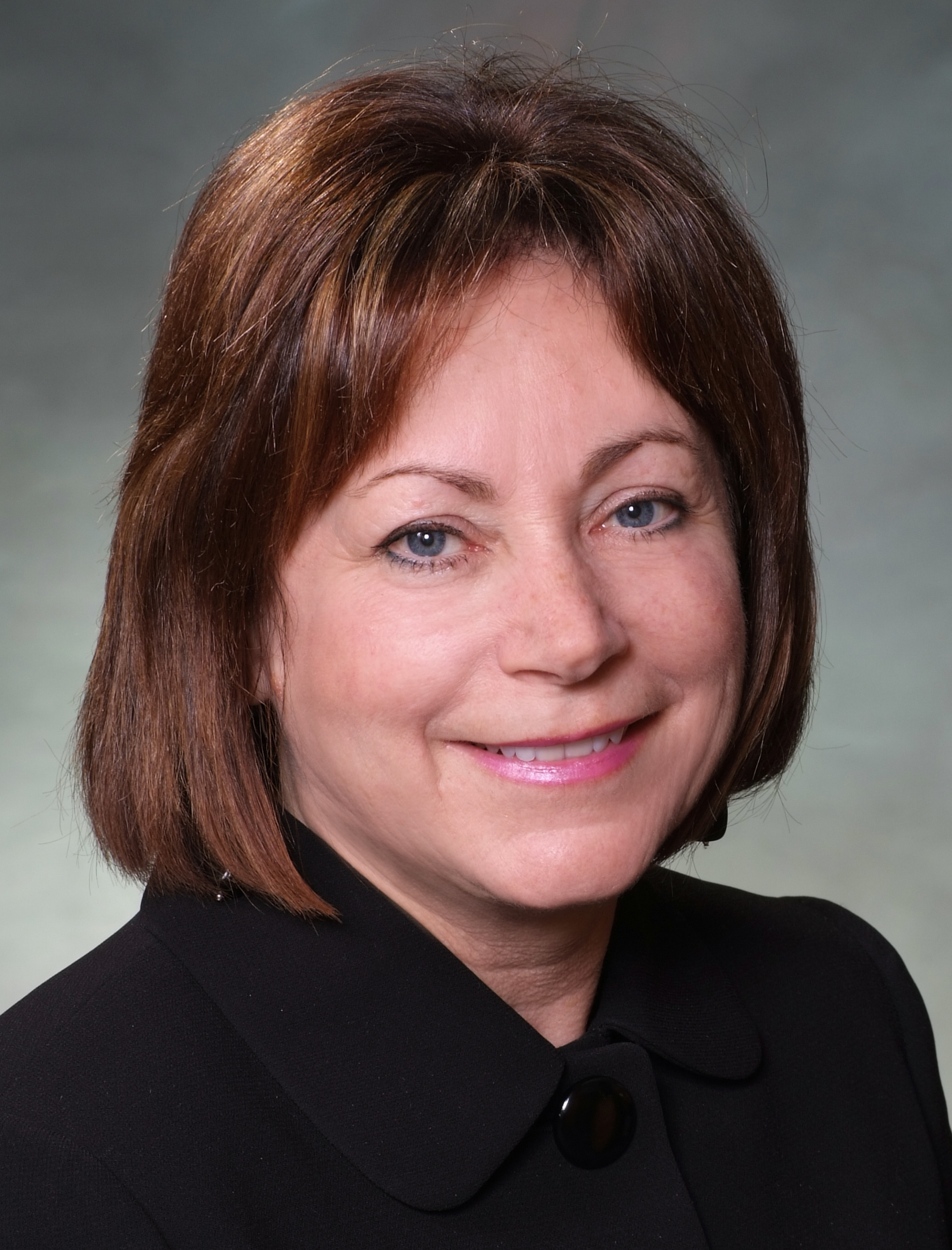
Dianne Primavera (D)
Lieutenant Governor

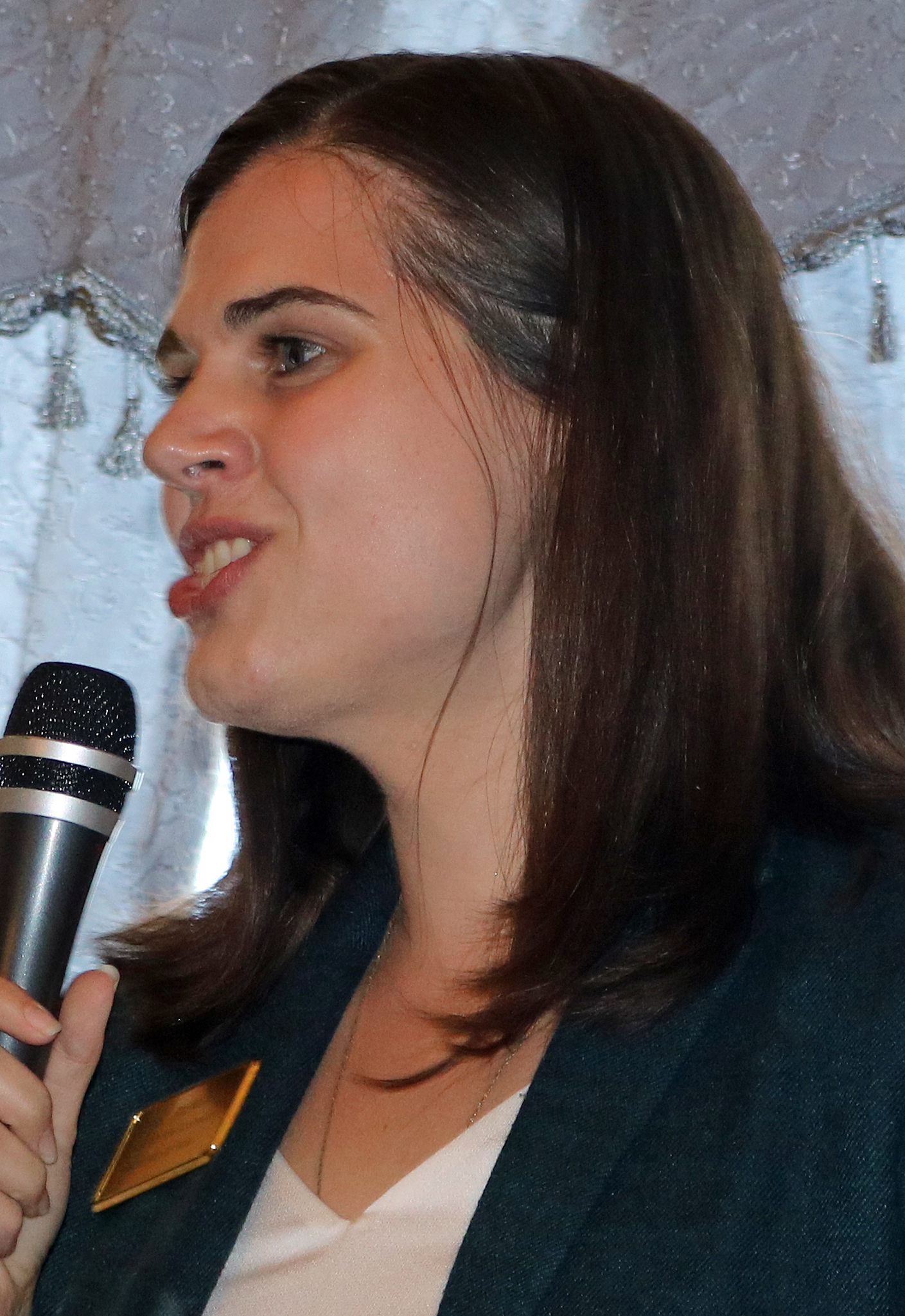
Jena Griswold (D)
Secretary of State

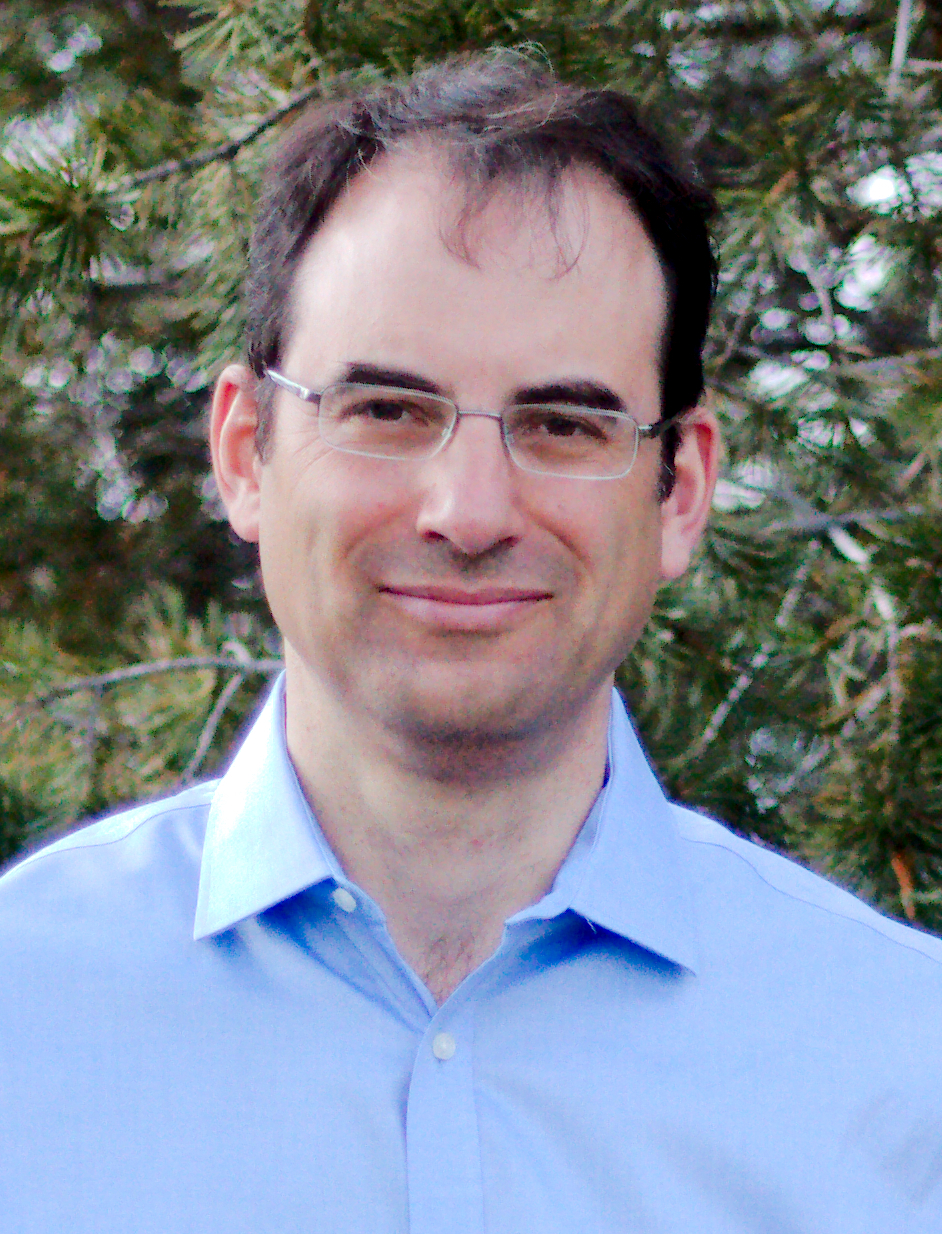
Phil Weiser (D)
Attorney General

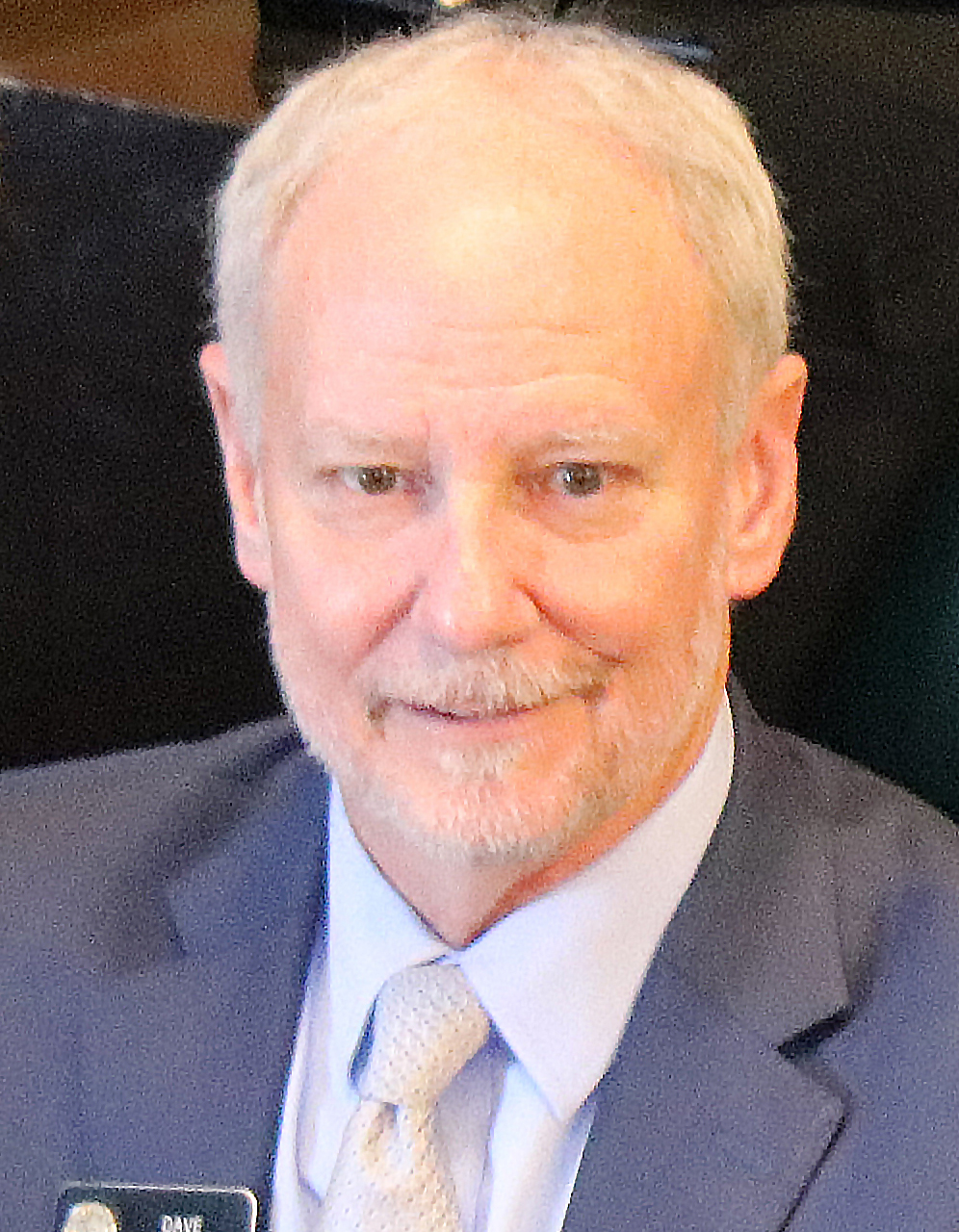
Dave Young (D)
State Treasurer

The Lieutenant Governor is elected on a ticket with the Governor. All statewide elected officers serve four-year terms.

==== Other elected executive branch officials ====
There are also elected members of the Colorado State Board of Education, and the Regents of the University of Colorado are elected from districts coterminous with Colorado's congressional districts or at large. As a result, the Governor does not have direct management authority over either the Department of Education or any of the state's institutions of higher education.

=== Principal departments of the executive branch ===
The executive branch is otherwise composed of the principal departments:

- Department of Agriculture (CDA)
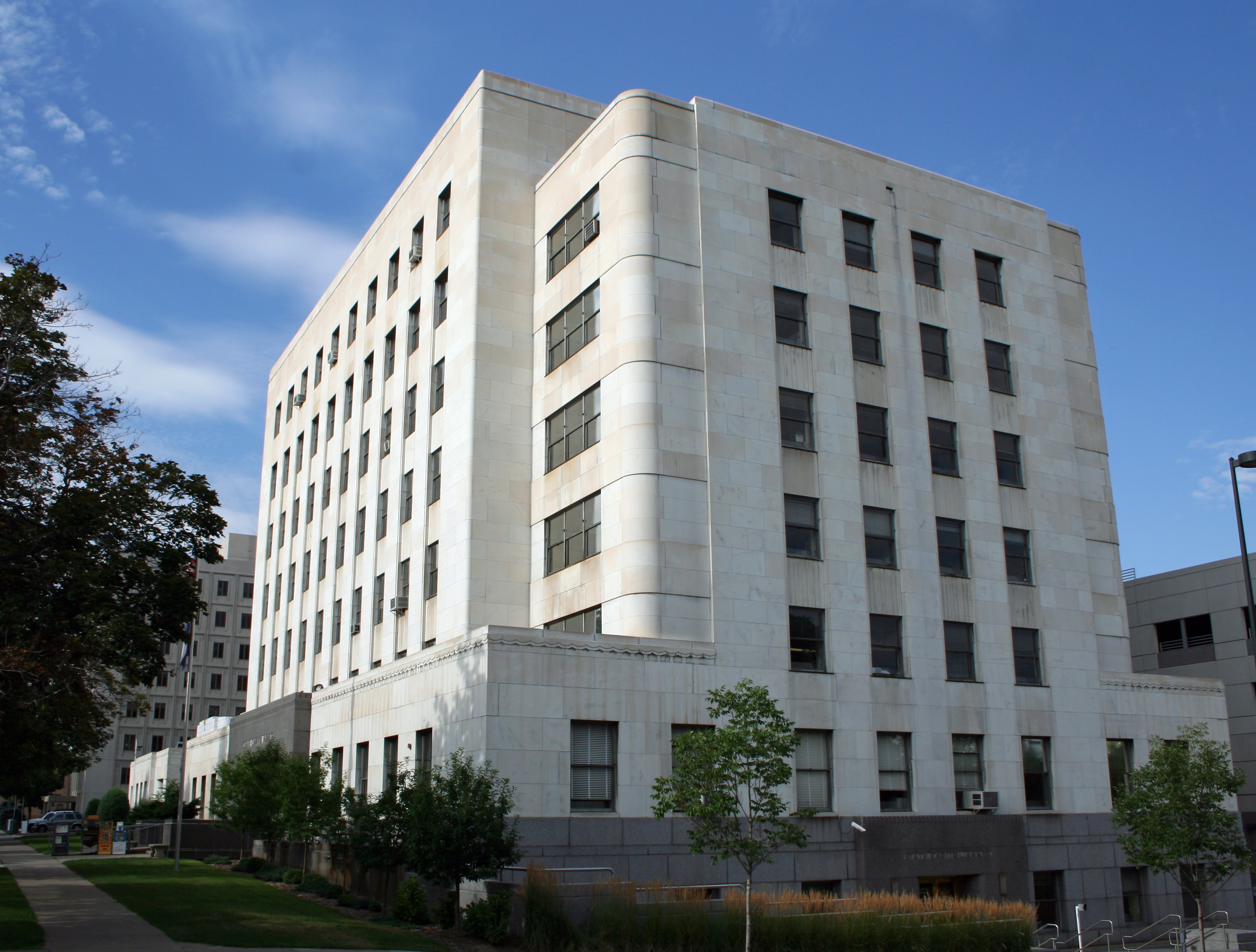
  The State Capitol Annex in Denver
- Department of Corrections (CDOC)
- Department of Early Childhood (CDEC)
- Department of Education (CDE)
- Department of Health Care Policy and Financing (HCPF)
- Department of Higher Education (CDHE)
- Department of Human Services (CDHS)
- Department of Labor and Employment (CDLE)
- Department of Law (DOL)
- Department of Local Affairs (DOLA)
- Department of Military and Veterans Affairs (DMVA)
- Department of Natural Resources (CDNR)
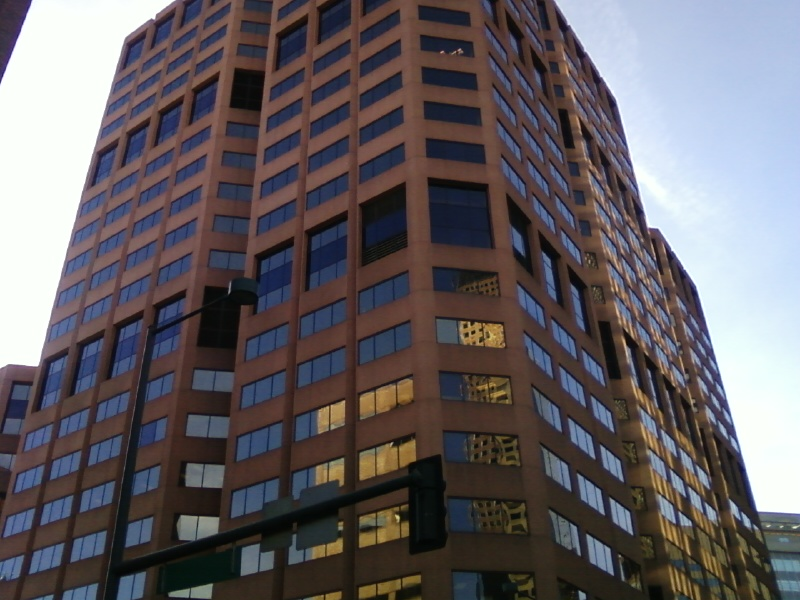
  One Civic Center Plaza in Denver
- Department of Personnel and Administration (DPA)
- Department of Public Health and Environment (CDPHE)
- Department of Public Safety (CDPS)
- Department of Regulatory Agencies (DORA)
- Department of Revenue (DOR)
- Department of State (DOS)
- Department of Transportation (CDOT)
- Department of the Treasury (CDT)

Regulations are published in the Colorado Register and codified in the Code of Colorado Regulations (CCR).

== Legislature ==
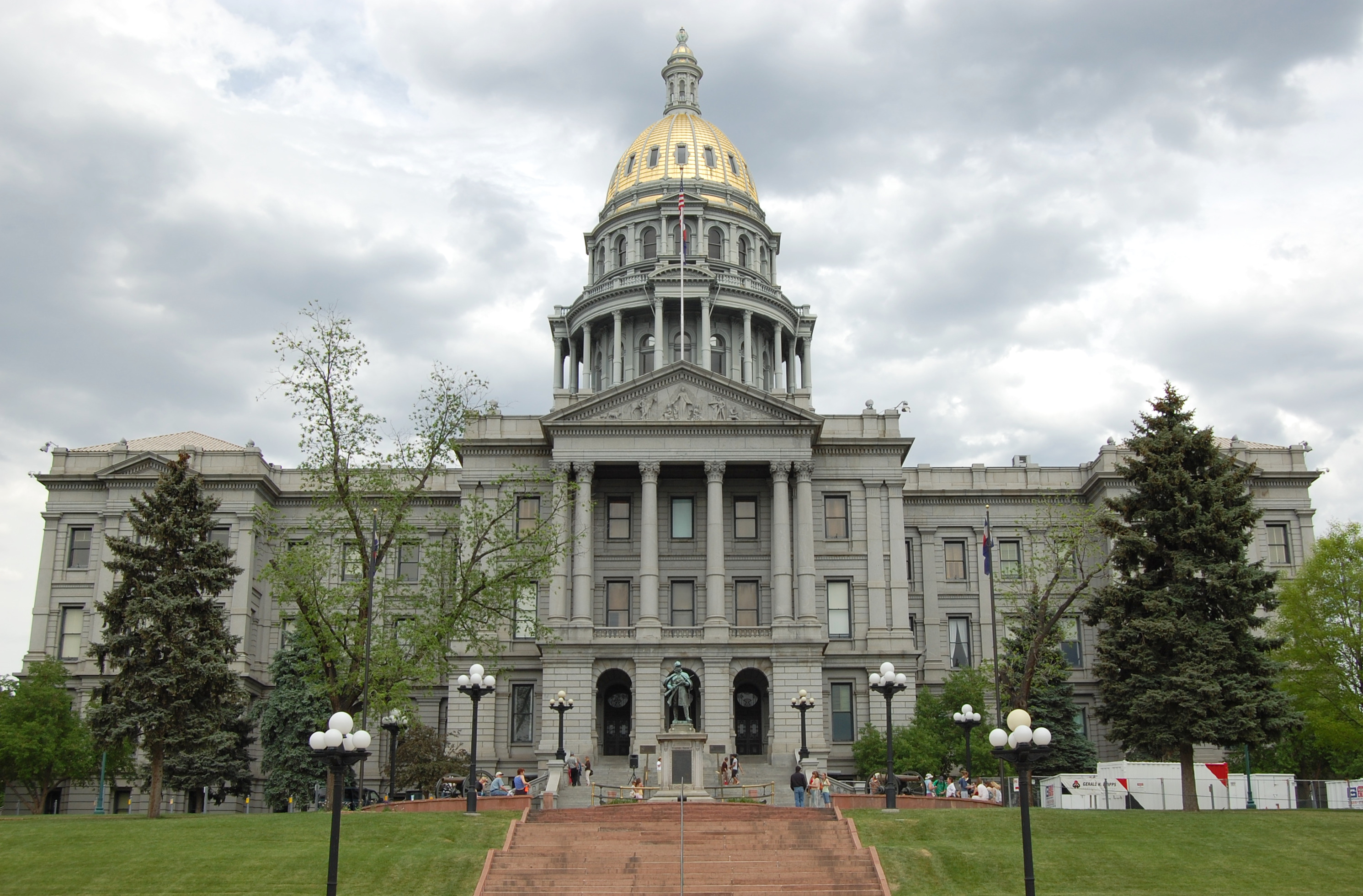
The Colorado State Capitol in Denver.

The legislative body of Colorado is the Colorado General Assembly made up of two houses, the House of Representatives and the Colorado Senate. Members of the House are elected for two year terms from single-member, equal population districts. Approximately half of the members of the state senate are elected each two years to four year terms from single-member, equal population districts. The House of Representatives has 65 members and the Senate has 35 for a total of 100 legislators in Colorado. The session laws are published in the Session Laws of Colorado. The laws of a general and permanent nature are codified in the Colorado Revised Statutes (C.R.S.).

== Direct democracy ==
In addition to providing for voting, the people of Colorado have reserved to themselves the:

- initiative of laws,
- referendum of other legislative acts, and
- recall of office holders.

== Judiciary ==
The judiciary of Colorado is defined by Article VI of the Colorado Constitution as well as the law of Colorado. The administration of the state judicial system is the responsibility of the Chief Justice of the Colorado Supreme Court as its executive head, and is assisted by several other commissions. Colorado courts include the:

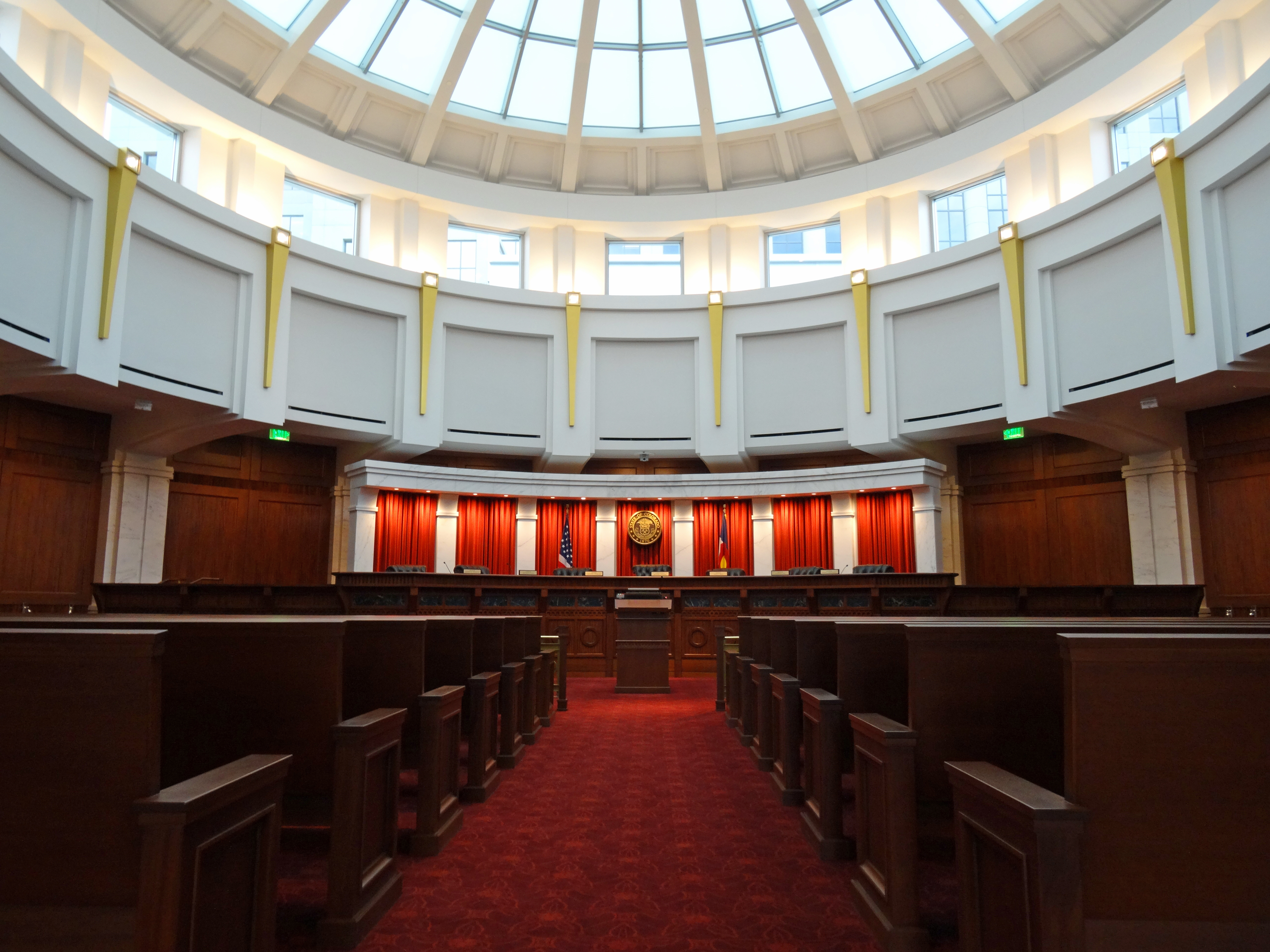
The Colorado Supreme Court courtroom in Denver

- Colorado Supreme Court,
- Colorado Court of Appeals,
- Colorado district courts,
- Colorado county courts,
- Colorado water courts,
- Colorado municipal courts.

All of the courts above, other than municipal courts and Denver's county court, are part of the state court system. In Denver, county and municipal courts are integrated and are not part of the state court system for administrative purposes, and the Denver Probate Court and the Denver Juvenile Court have jurisdiction over probate and juvenile matters, respectively. Outside Denver, these matters are within the jurisdiction of the district courts.

Most crimes in Colorado are prosecuted by a district attorney. One district attorney is elected for each of the state's 22 judicial districts in a partisan election. The state attorney general also has power to prosecute certain crimes, and in rare circumstances a special prosecutor may be appointed to prosecute a crime on a case by case basis. Municipal ordinance violations are prosecuted by city attorneys.

== Local government ==
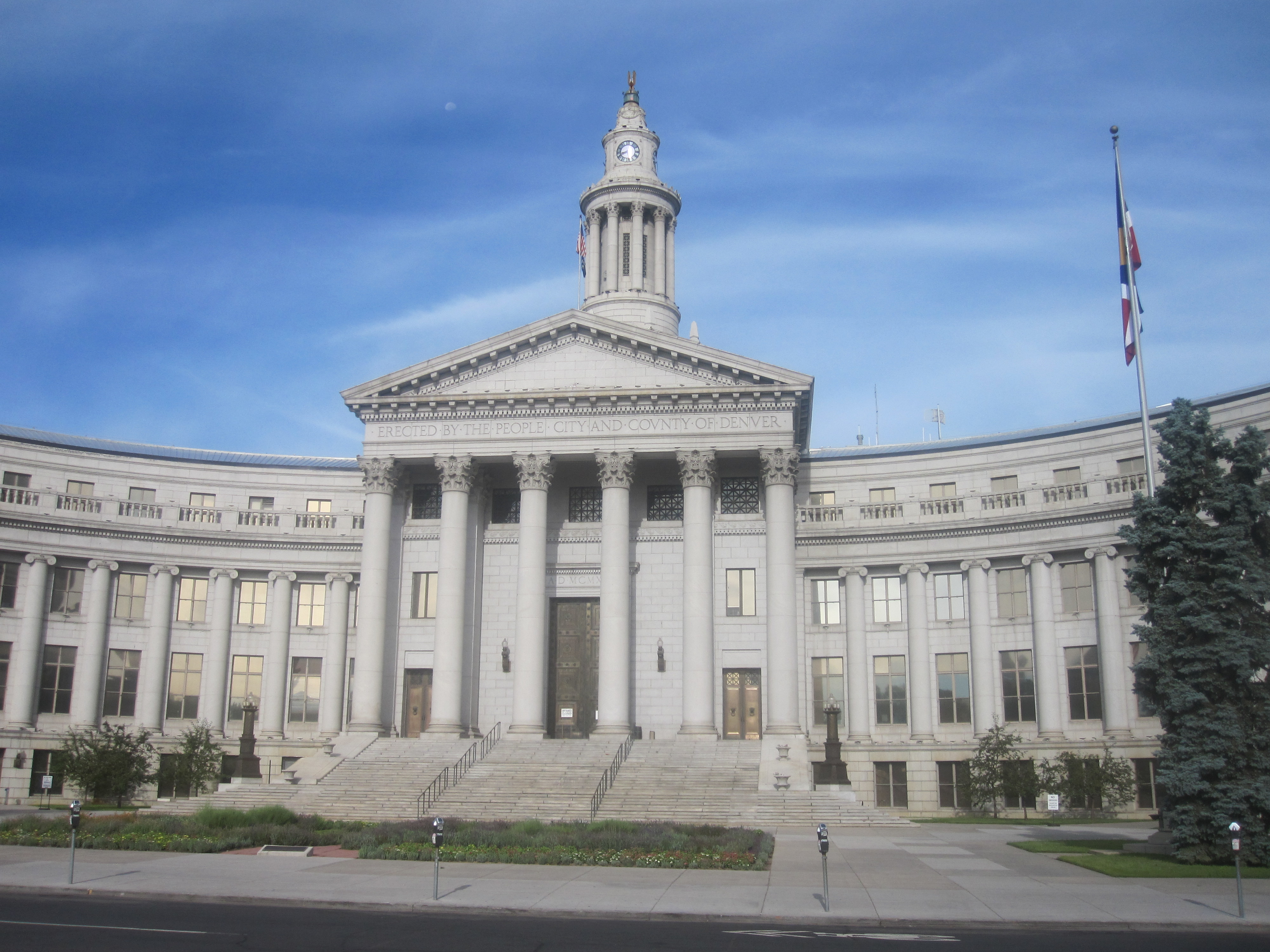
The Denver City and County Building.

Colorado is divided into 64 counties, two of which (Pitkin and Weld) are home rule. Counties are important units of government in Colorado since the state has no secondary civil subdivisions, such as townships. Two of these counties, the City and County of Denver and the City and County of Broomfield, have consolidated city and county governments.

The 273 Colorado municipalities operate under one of five types of municipal governing authority:

- 2 consolidated city and county governments (Broomfield and Denver)
- 102 cities and towns that are home rule municipalities
- 11 statutory cities
- 157 statutory towns
- 1 territorial charter municipality (Georgetown)

A municipality may extend into multiple counties. There are no township governments in Colorado, but there are more than 4,000 special districts. See Active Colorado Local Governments.

Other political subdivisions include the University of Colorado Hospital Authority, which provides patient care through UCHealth (University of Colorado Health), and the Denver Health And Hospital Authority (Denver Health), which operates a hospital south of downtown Denver among other facilities.

== Other governments ==
There are two federally recognized tribes in Colorado: the Southern Ute Indian Tribe and the Ute Mountain Ute Tribe. There are no other known state-recognized tribes.

== See also ==
- Elections in Colorado
- Law of Colorado
- Politics of Colorado
- Bibliography of Colorado
- Geography of Colorado
- History of Colorado
- Index of Colorado-related articles
- List of Colorado-related lists
- Outline of Colorado
