= Colorado Division of Youth Services =

Division of the Colorado Department of Human Services

The Colorado Division of Youth Services (formerly the Colorado Division of Youth Corrections) is a division of the Colorado Department of Human Services and is based in Denver. The division supervises and cares for youth the district courts commit to its custody. It operates 15 detention or residential facilities for youth aged 10 to 21. The division also manages juvenile parole in Colorado.

== Facilities ==
Colorado DYS operates 15 facilities across the state known as youth services centers. These facilities operate at one of three different classifications: secure detention for youth detained or awaiting adjudication, secure treatment for sentenced or committed youth, and multi-purpose accommodating both detained and committed youth.

- Campus at Lookout Mountain (Golden)
  - Aspire Youth Services Center (committed males)
  - Clear Creek Youth Services Center (committed males)
  - Golden Peak Youth Services Center (committed males)
  - Summit Youth Services Center (committed males)
- Campus at Mount View (Denver)
  - Betty K. Marler Youth Services Center (committed females)
  - Phoenix Youth Services Center (committed males)
  - Rocky Mountain Youth Services Center (co-ed multi-purpose)
  - Spring Creek Youth Services Center (co-ed multi-purpose)
- Grand Mesa Youth Services Center (Grand Junction) (co-ed multi-purpose)
- Marvin W. Foote Youth Services Center (Englewood) (co-ed detention)
- Phillip B. Gilliam Youth Services Center (Denver) (co-ed detention)
- Platte Valley Youth Services Center (Greeley) (co-ed multi-purpose)
- Prairie Vista Youth Services Center (Brighton) (co-ed detention)
- Pueblo Youth Services Center (Pueblo) (co-ed detention)
- Zebulon Pike Youth Services Center (Colorado Springs) (co-ed detention)
