= Colorado Department of Human Services =

Department of the Colorado state government

Department of Human Services
Department overview
- Jurisdiction: Colorado
- Motto: We're the people who help people.
- Department executive: Vacant, Executive Director
- Website: cdhs.colorado.gov

The Colorado Department of Human Services (CDHS) is the principal department of the Colorado state government that operates the state's social services. It has its headquarters in Denver.

== Offices and Divisions ==
=== Office of Adult, Aging and Disability Services ===
- Division of Aging and Adult Services - focuses on services benefiting older adults
- Division of Regional Center Operations - oversees regional centers serving people with intellectual and developmental disabilities
- Veterans Community Living Centers - offers living centers for veterans and qualifying family members
- Disability Determination Services - state agency that makes Social Security disability decisions
- Colorado Commission for the Deaf, Hard of Hearing and DeafBlind
- MINDSOURCE Colorado Brain Injury Network - provides services for people with brain injury
- Colorado Developmental Disabilities Council

=== Office of Civil and Forensic Mental Health ===
- Mental Health Hospitals - operates the state’s psychiatric hospitals
- Forensic Services
- Mental Health Transitional Living Homes

=== Office of Children, Youth and Families ===
- Division of Child Welfare - oversees child welfare practice and services
- Division of Community Programs
- Division of Youth Services - provides care to youth committed to the custody of the Department of Human Services
- Medical Oversight Unit
- Finance
- Communications
- Judicial and Legislation
- Colorado Implementation Science Unit

=== Office of Economic Security ===
- Division of Child Support Services - oversees child support in the state
- Division of Food and Energy Assistance
- Division of Economic and Workforce Support
- Staff Development Division

=== Community Partnerships ===
- Client Services
- Community and Family Engagement
- County and Tribal Liaisons
- Equity, Diversity and Inclusion - develops plans to foster inclusivity in the state government
- Implementation and Strategic Planning
- Operations
- Policy Advisory Committee - a forum for counties to make recommendations about policy changes

=== Administrative Solutions ===
- Human Resources
- Business Innovation, Technology and Security
- Legal
- Quality Assurance
- Facilities Management
- Audit

=== Financial Services ===
- Accounting
- Budget and Policy
- Contracts and Procurement
