= Colorado Open Records Act =

The Colorado Open Records Act (CORA) is the state freedom of information law in Colorado. Enacted in 1969, the legislation was patterned after the federal Freedom of Information Act (FOIA).

== History and reform efforts ==
Following the passage of the 1977 Criminal Justice Records Act, law enforcement agencies and courts were given discretion to withhold all criminal justice documents with the exception of "records of official action", including arrest and conviction records.

In the 21st century, concerns over high fees for filing requests for information and inadequate access to filing systems has led to calls for reforming the law. In 2014, a coalition of lawmakers pushed a proposal to cap charges for filing CORA requests to four times the Colorado minimum wage. In 2020, a Denver Post investigation discovered wide inconsistencies between state agencies' email retention practices, raising freedom of information concerns.

In 2022, a bipartisan coalition in the Colorado Senate led by Democrat Chris Hansen and Republican John Cooke pushed reform legislation that would have, among other provisions, abolished per-page fees for electronic record requests. However, the bill ultimately did not make it into law

== See also ==
- Freedom of Information Act (FOIA), federal legislation governing freedom of information
- Freedom of information in the United States
