= Colorado Department of Labor and Employment =

Department of the Colorado state government

Department of Labor and Employment
Department overview
- Jurisdiction: Colorado
- Department executive: Joe Barela, Executive Director
- Website: colorado.gov/cdle

The Colorado Department of Labor and Employment (CDLE) connects job seekers with great jobs, provides an up-to-date and accurate picture of the economy to help decision making, assists workers who have been injured on the job, ensures fair labor practices, helps those who have lost their jobs by providing temporary wage replacement through unemployment benefits, and protects the workplace — and Colorado communities — with a variety of consumer protection and safety programs.

== Actions ==
CDLE enforces labor laws. For example, in 2025 and 2026 after several instances of not paying their employees and routine late payment of employees several farms were prohibited from hiring workers via the H2-A program, and assessed back-wages and penalties.
