= Susanne E. Jalbert =

Activist for economic development, women's rights and gender equity

- Born: Susanne Elaine Beckman; 1951; Phelps County, Nebraska
- Occupation(s): Activists for women's rights and safety, gender equality, and economic development

External image
- Susanne E. Jalbert, photograph

Susanne E. Jalbert (née Beckman; born 1951) is an activist for economic development, women's rights, and gender equity. Her work includes being a global leader, senior advisor, and mentor, including her work with the United States Agency for International Development (USAID) around the world. She received the Distinguished Alumni Award from Colorado State University in 2011 and was inducted into the Colorado Women's Hall of Fame in 2022.

== Personal life and education ==
Susanne Elaine Beckman was born in 1951 in Holdrege Phelps County, Nebraska to Darrell H. Beckman. On March 17, 1973, she married William W. (Bill) Jalbert Jr. in Douglas County, Nevada, becoming Susanne E. Jalbert. Jalbert and her husband adopted a girl from Moldova, who is now married with two sons. Jalbert lives in Winter Park in Grand County, Colorado.

Jalbert received her Bachelor of Art from Saint Mary's College of California. At Colorado State University, she earned her master's degree in Education and Human Services in 1997 and then her Ph.D., during which she created the program "International Business Education and Training".

== Career ==
Jalbert worked as a tax accountant in the 1970s and 1980s, opening her own business in California. She also owned art-related businesses. She became interested in equity for women when she realized that women could not get credit cards and build a credit history on their own, which is essential for business owners.

Jalbert moved to Colorado in 1987. She worked at the Red Rocks Community College under Dorothy Horrell to develop educational programs and at the women's resource center. In the 1990s, she worked with Patricia Barela Rivera to create business educational opportunities for hundreds of Russians. Both Horell and Rivera are also Colorado Women's Hall of Fame inductees.

Now, Jalbert advocates for peace, women's rights and equity, and security, including spreading awareness about the related global challenges. She works with universities to provide programs for global change agents, such as the University of Denver's Inclusive Global Leadership Initiative, and is a mentor. Her home base is in Colorado, and she has worked in more than 50 countries around the world. Jalbert intercedes in areas where there are threats of physical harm and trafficking and limited economic possibilities for women due to their country's instability or war. She has written, spoken, and implemented programs to improve economic opportunities for women, including starting businesses, and fostered dignity and hope in communities around the world. She has researched ways to reduce human trafficking. She established Jalbert Consulting in 1981. Her clients include Deloitte Touche Tohmatsu International.

Jalbert has worked on United States Agency for International Development (USAID) initiatives, including being a senior advisor to 35 USAID implementing partners. Her work has included:

- USAID-Afghanistan Women in Government
- USAID-Afghanistan Herat Consulate diplomat
- Iraq business services director
- USAID-Moldova Anti-Trafficking Initiative
- USAID-Iraq Durable Communities and Economic Opportunities project

In 2015, she served as commissioner on the Colorado Office of Judicial Performance Evaluation Commission. Governor John Hickenlooper appointed her to evaluate judges and create material to help voters decide who they want to elect to be judges.

== Awards and honors ==
The College of Applied Human Sciences of Colorado State University recognized Jalbert with their Distinguished Alumni Award in 2011. She was inducted into the Colorado Women's Hall of Fame in 2022 for her activism and advocacy of women's rights and economic development.
