= Arlene Vigil Kramer =

Bilingual educator in Colorado (1938-)

- Born: April 1, 1938; Colorado
- Education: University of Colorado Boulder
- Occupation: Bilingual educator

Arlene Vigil Kramer, EdD, (born April 1, 1938) is an advocate for bilingual and bicultural education, and was the first Latina to complete a Doctor of Education degree.

== Early life ==
Arlene Vigil Kramer was born on April 1, 1938 in Colorado.

Kramer earned a master's and doctorate degrees at University of Colorado Boulder.

== Career ==
In 1959, Kramer began teaching second grade at Spann Elementary School in Pueblo, Colorado. 80% of the students had limited English skills, and Kramer designed the first Bilingual Instruction Curriculum in Colorado. Kramer was a founding member and first Vice President of the Colorado Association for Bilingual and Bi-cultural Education (CABBE). This organization was part of the coalition for the Colorado Bilingual-Bicultural Education Act of 1975.

Kramer worked at other higher education institutions, including: instructor of Education and Reading at Metropolitan State College, Regional Director for the Federal HEW Office of Human Development, Vice President of Instruction for Front Range Community College, and Dean of the School of Professional Studies for Metropolitan State College.

Additionally, Kramer was involved in the community on the boards of education organizations. She sat on the board of the National Head Start Bilingual Programs Overview Board, the Child Welfare League of America, and the National Council de La Raza.

In 1979, Kramer, Patricia Barela Rivera, Linda Alvarado, Dr. Cecilia Cervantes, and Irene Ibarra founded "Adelante Mujer," an organization that hosts educational conferences, workshops, and symposia in order to support the needs for Latinas entering school and college. In 1979, they hosted a conference in St. Cajetan's Church on Auraria campus. Over 1000 women attended. The conference celebrated women and their contribution to the community, and addressed systemic issues like racism and sexism.

Kramer also worked with P.E.O. International, which supports the educational advancement of women. After leaving academia, Kramer became president and owner of AVK Associates Marketing and Training.

== Published works ==
- Cuarón, Alicia V., Arlene Vigil (Kramer), and Dorothy Renteria. "La Mujer en el Ochenta [Women in the Eighties]." La Luz, Volume 8, Number 3, August–September, 1979: pages 16-17.

== Recognition ==
- 2016, Colorado Women's Hall of Fame inductee
- 2016, Latina Legacy Circle inductee
