= Colorado Women's Hall of Fame =

U.S. non-profit organization

Coordinates: 38.9972°N 105.5478°W

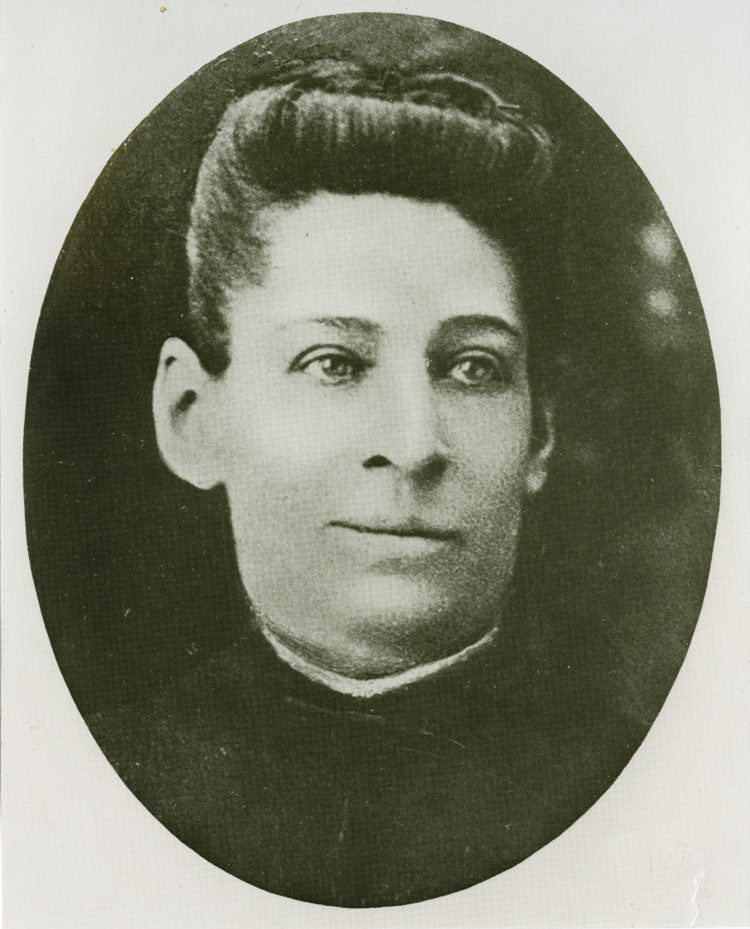
Frances Wisebart Jacobs, philanthropist, founder of the organization that became the United Way

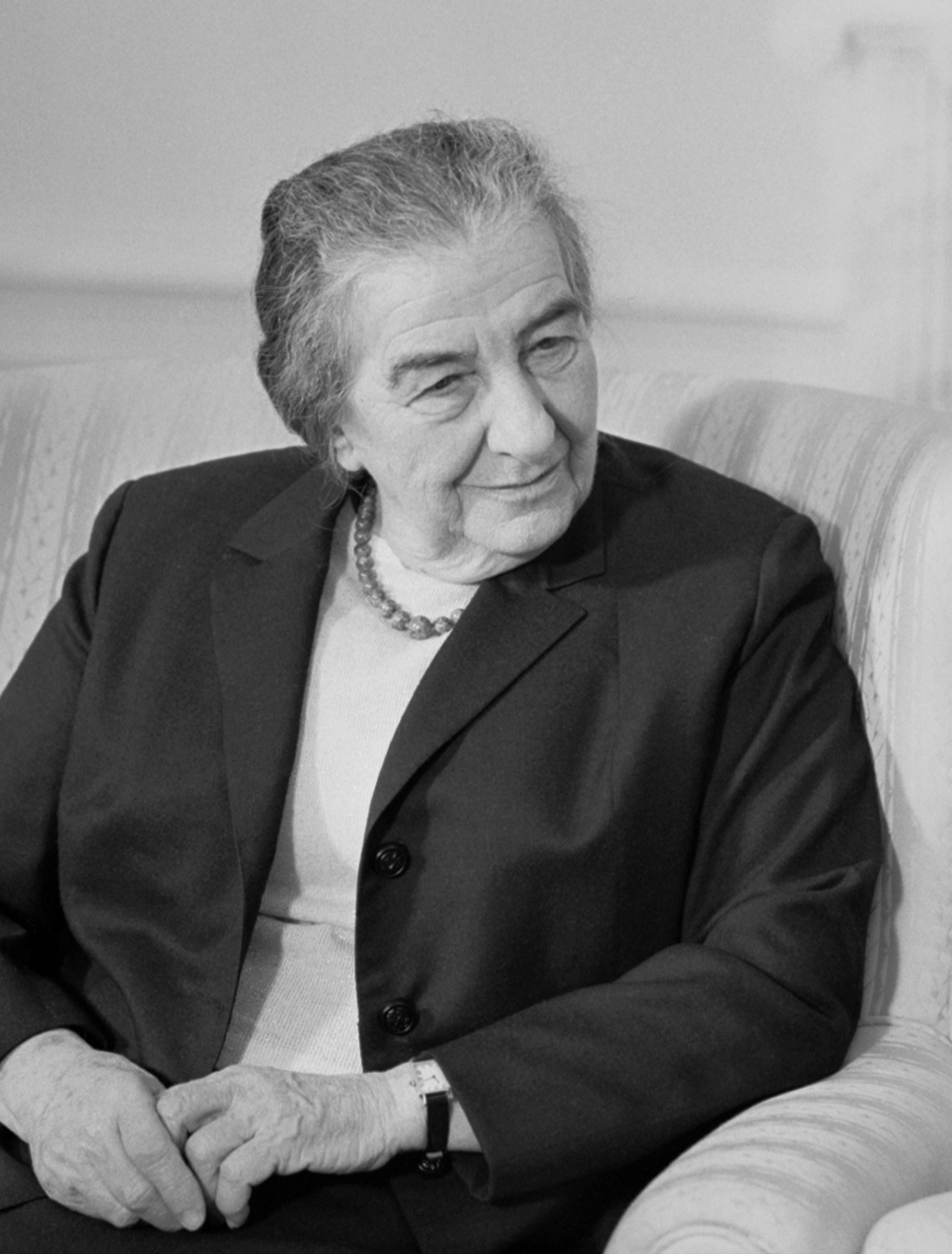
Golda Meir, Israel's fourth Prime Minister

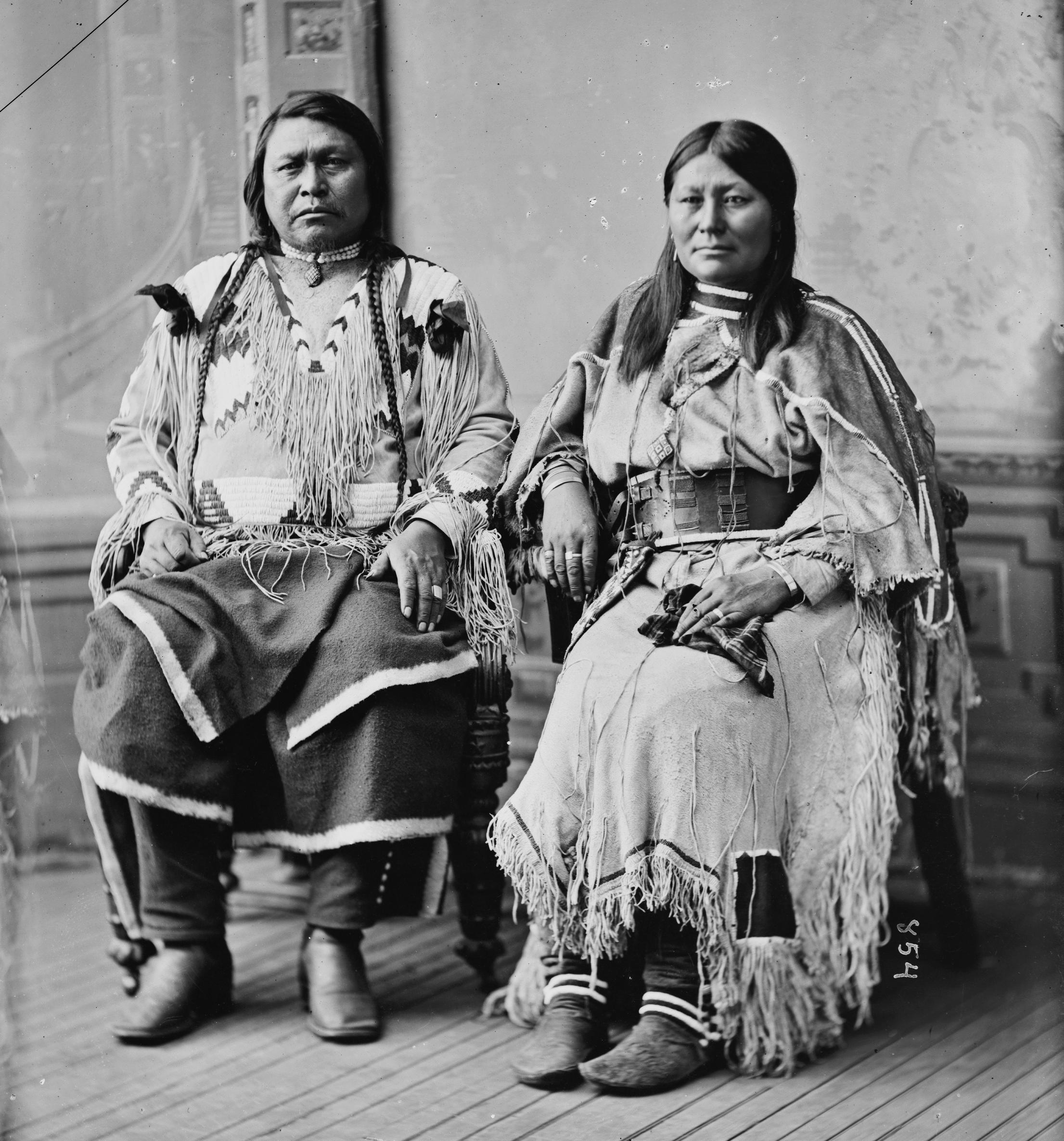
Chipeta, leader and negotiator, with her husband Chief Ouray

The Colorado Women's Hall of Fame is a non-profit, volunteer organization that recognizes women who have contributed to the history of the U.S. state of Colorado. As of 2024, 205 women have been inducted.

== History ==
There was a short-lived recognition program established in Colorado in 1965 to honor the contributions of women to the state, known as the Colorado Women of Achievement awards. Each year, three honorees from throughout the state who had distinguished themselves in their profession or avocation were recognized at an annual banquet held in Denver, given a cash award, and received a pin with the emblem of the program, which was sponsored by the Columbia Savings and Loan Association. The 1965 inductees, honored in 1966, included Verona Burkhard, Jo Eleanor Elliott and Sister Frances Marie Walsh. In 1967 the inductees for the 1966 award were Sabina O’Malley, Elizabeth McAulliffe Calabrese, and Genevieve Fiore. In 1968, the honorees for 1967 were recognized. They included Rena Mary Taylor, Marion M. Maresh, Mrs. E. Ray Campbell. Two Life Award recipients, honoring a life-long commitment of service, were given to Mary M. McDonald and Ella Matty Orman. 1968 inductees, recognized in 1969 were Anna M. Garnett, Betty Pellet, and Margaret Rossi, with Ruby Lewis Neal being recognized with the Life Award.

Almost two decades later, a new recognition program began. The Hall of Fame organization was founded and incorporated as a non-profit organization in 1984 to recognize women's contributions to the territory and state of Colorado and to provide role-models for young girls and women. Serving on the board also offers leadership opportunities for women. Discussed conceptually in February 1984, it was organized by June of the same year. M.L. Hanson sat as the president on the board until 1997.

== Criteria ==
The criteria for induction into the Colorado Women's Hall of Fame is that women have "significant ties to Colorado and during their lifetimes:

- Made significant and enduring contributions to their fields of endeavor
- Elevated the status of women
- Helped open new frontiers for women and for society in general
- Inspired others by their example"

== Inductees ==
Up to 10 inductees are admitted to the Hall of Fame every evenly numbered year.

Colorado Women's Hall of Fame
Name	Image	Birth–Death	Year	Area of achievement	Ref(s)
Judith E. N. Albino		(b. 1943)	2024	17th president of the University of Colorado System	
Madeleine Albright		(1937–2022)	2010	First woman to become the United States Secretary of State	
Anna Lee Aldred		(1921–2006)	2004	First woman in the United States to receive a jockey's license	
Stephanie Allen		(1937–2022)	2006	Founder of the Colorado Women's Coalition; founded Women's Vision Foundation to develop leadership skills among women; first woman recipient of the Dan Ritchie Award for Ethics in Business; Businesswoman, women's advocate, and civic leader;	
Linda G. Alvarado		(b. 1952)	2002	President and CEO of Alvarado Construction	
Theodosia Grace Ammons		(1861–1907)	2022	Powerful first wave feminist, suffragist and advocate for women's education	
Mary Lou Anderson		(1917–1994)	2020	Cultural arts and arts education	
Susan Anderson		(1870–1960)	1997	Frontier doctor	
Sue Anschutz-Rodgers		(b. 1936)	2008	Cattle rancher, philanthropist	
Kristi S. Anseth		(b. 1969)	2012	Tisone Professor and associate professor of surgery at the University of Colorado at Boulder	
Eppie Archuleta		(1922–2014)	1997	Folk artist	
Katherine Archuleta		(b. 1949)	2020	First Latina Director of the United States Office of Personnel Management	
Lena Lovato Archuleta		(1920–2011)	1985	Colorado educator, first Latina principal in the Denver Public Schools	
Christine Arguello		(b. 1955)	2014	Federal judge on the United States District Court for the District of Colorado and is a former Colorado state official	
Alida Cornelia Avery		(1833–1908)	2020	Physiclan, college professor, first president of the Colorado Woman Suffrage Association	
Polly Baca		(b. 1941)	2000	First woman to chair the Democratic Caucus of the Colorado House of Representatives (1976–79) and the first Latina elected to the Colorado State Senate	
Morley Cowles Ballantine		(1925–2009)	2014	Newspaper publisher, philanthropist	
Caroline Bancroft		(1900–1985)	1990	Journalist, former Ziegfeld Follies performer	
Ceal Barry		(b. 1955)	1997	Women's basketball coach	
Christine Benero		(b. 1960)	2024	President and CEO of Mile High United Way	
Isabella Bird		(1831–1904)	1985	Explorer, writer, and natural historian	
Joan Birkland		(1928–2019)	1996	Athlete and organizer	
Helen Marie Black		(1896–1988)	1991	Founder of the Denver Symphony Orchestra	
Mae Boettcher		(1912–2001)	2018	Philanthropist who supported cultural and healthcare facilities	
Helen Bonfils		(1889–1972)	1985	Arts patron, philanthropist, managed the Denver Post	
Janet Bonnema		(1938–2008)	2012	Transportation engineer for the Colorado Highway Department; won a 1972 sexual discrimination lawsuit against the Colorado Department of Highways when she was barred from working inside the Eisenhower Tunnel.	
Juana Bordas		(b. 1942)	1997	President of the National Hispana Leadership Institute, Peace Corps volunteer and advocate for women	
Libby Bortz		(b. 1934)	2022	Community activist in housing, education and criminal justice	
Elise M. Boulding		(1920–2010)	1996	Quaker sociologist and major contributor to creating the academic discipline of Peace and Conflict Studies	
Louie Croft Boyd		(1871–1951)	2004	Helped found the Colorado State Trained Nurses Association	
Antonia Brico		(1902–1989)	1986	Conductor and pianist	
Barbara Bridges			2024	Founder of Women+Film	
Guadalupe Briseño		(1933–2024)	2020	Chicana leader in Colorado’s Labor Movement	
Clara Brown		(1800–1885)	1989	Aided the settlement of former slaves during Colorado's Gold Rush	
Molly Brown		(1867–1932)	1985	Socialite, philanthropist, and activist who became famous due to her survival of the 1912 sinking of the RMS Titanic	
Joy S. Burns		(1927–2020)	2000	President of the Burnsley Hotel in Denver	
Frances Xavier Cabrini		(1850–1917)	2022	Champion of immigrants, the poor and the sick	
Hendrika B. Cantwell		(b. 1925)	1990	Advocate for neglected and abused children	
Lauren Young Casteel		(b. 1953)	2014	First black woman to head a foundation in Colorado	
Merle Chambers		(b. 1946)	2004	Philanthropist, businesswoman, and lawyer	
Mary Coyle Chase		(1906–1981)	1985	Journalist, playwright and screenwriter, known primarily for writing the Broadway play Harvey	
Chipeta		(1843/4–1924)	1985	Second wife of Chief Ouray of the Uncompahgre Ute tribe, she led her people after his death in 1880. Chipeta used diplomacy to try to achieve peace with the white immigrants to Colorado and often represented the Utes as a delegate to lobby the US Congress	
Caroline Nichols Churchill		(1833–1926)	1988	Feminist writer	
Fran Coleman		(b. 1945)	2024	First Latina Colorado State Representative in House District 1	
Judy Collins		(b. 1939)	2006	Singer-songwriter	
Gail Benjamin Colvin		(b. 1955)	2024	Director of Staff at the United States Air Force Academy	
Vicki Jane Cowart		(b. 1954)	2022	Champion for women scientists and dedicated crusader for women's reproductive rights	
Oleta Crain		(1913–2007)	1988	Major in the U.S. Army, regional administrator of the Women's Bureau for the U.S. Department of Labor	
Dana Hudkins Crawford		(1931-2025)	1996	Historic preservationist and developer	
Alicia Cuarón		(b. 1939)	2008	Mexican-American educator, human rights activist, and prominent Latina leader who became a Franciscan nun after a successful business career	
Margaret L. Curry		(1898–1986)	1996	Parole officer and advocate for women prisoners	
Evie Dennis		(b. 1924)	2008	Education and athletics advocate; Sportswomen of Colorado Hall of Fame 1997; Laureate of the Association of National Olympic Committees 1999; United States Track and Field Hall of Fame 2004	
Ruth Cousins Denny		(1920–2012)	2022	Educator and human rights activist	
Marion Downs		(1914–2014)	2006	Audiologist and professor at the University of Colorado Health Sciences Center who pioneered universal newborn hearing screening	
Jean Dubofsky		(b. 1942)	2008	First woman to become a Colorado Supreme Court Justice, former Deputy Attorney General for Colorado	
Fannie Mae Duncan		(1918–2005)	2012	Owner of The Cotton Club bar in Colorado Springs	
Mamie Eisenhower		(1896–1979)	1985	Wife of President Dwight D. Eisenhower, and First Lady of the United States from 1953 to 1961	
Elizabeth Piper Ensley		(1847–1919)	2020	African American educator, political activist, and suffragist	
Clarissa Pinkola Estés		(b. 1943)	2006	American poet, post-trauma specialist and Jungian psychoanalyst	
Anne Evans		(1871–1941)	2016	American arts activist who devoted her life to the founding and support of some of Colorado's largest cultural institutions, including the Denver Art Museum, the Central City Opera, and the Denver Civic Center	
Edwina Hume Fallis		(1876–1957)	1989	Author	
Terri H. Finkel		(b. 1953)	1996	Researcher into auto-immunity, AIDS, juvenile rheumatoid arthritis, lupus, and cancer	
Genevieve Fiore		(1912–2002)	1991	Humanitarian and peace activist	
Justina Ford		(1871–1952)	1985	Denver's first black woman physician	
Loretta Ford		(1920-2025)	2012	Dean of the University of Rochester School of Nursing (1972–1985), co-founded the nurse-practitioner model at the University of Colorado in 1965	
Leslie Foster		(b. 1957)	2018	Community activism	
Linda Fowler		(b. 1945)	2024	Planned Parenthood advocate; founder of the Colorado Legal Initiatives Project	
Virginia Fraser		(1928–2011)	2002	Advocate for women's rights and the elderly	
Patricia A. Gabow		(b. 1944)	2004	CEO of Denver Health and Hospital Authority	
Erinea Garcia Gallegos		(1903–2002)	2012	Educator and San Luis Valley postmistress	
Gudy Gaskill		(1927–2016)	2002	Outdoorswoman and organizer of the Colorado Trail	
Elnora M. Gilfoyle		(b. 1934)	1996	Occupational therapist and advocate for those with disabilities	
Laura Gilpin		(1891–1979)	2012	Photographer known for her portraits of Native Americans, particularly the Navajo and Pueblo, and her Southwestern landscapes	
Miriam Goldberg		(1916–2017)	1987	Publisher of the Intermountain Jewish News	
Carolína González		(1894–1996)	2020	Supporter of the arts and culture; provided a safe haven for economic and political refugees in Denver.	
Temple Grandin		(b. 1947)	2012	Doctor of animal science and professor at Colorado State University, bestselling author, and consultant to the livestock industry on animal behavior	
Elinor Miller Greenberg		(1932–2021)	2010	Adult educator and author	
Emily Griffith		(1868–1947)	1985	Pioneer of adult education, founder of the Emily Griffith Opportunity School	
Geraldine Grimes		(1950–2022)	2018	Community Service	
Barbara Grogan		(b. 1947)	2024	Businesswoman, founder of Western Industrial Contractors Inc, an industrial construction company	
Maria Guajardo		(b. 1959)	2010	Executive director of the Latin American Research and Service Agency	
Dusti Gurule		(b. 1969)	2024	Latina reproductive rights activist. Founding executive director of the Latina Initiative; President and CEO of the Colorado Organization for Latina Opportunity and Reproductive Rights	
Penny Rafferty Hamilton		(b. 1948)	2014	Pilot, educator, co-holder of World Aviation Speed Record, set October 22, 1991	
Zipporah Parks Hammond		(1924–2011)	2022	Dedicated medical professional; the first Black to earn a nursing degree from the University of Colorado	
Margaret "Meg" Hansson		(1922–2016)	2024	Entrepreneur, Gerry Baby Products Company	
Minnie Harding		(1857–1937)	2016	Philanthropist and charter member of the Colorado Federation of Women's Clubs.	
Rosalind Juanita Harris		(b. 1950)	2020	Founder of the Denver Urban Spectrum newspaper and the Urban Spectrum Youth Foundation	
Anna Jo Garcia Haynes		(b. 1934)	2016	Civil rights activist who brought the national Head Start Program to Denver; president emeritus, Mile High Montessori Early Learning Centers	
Josie Heath		(b. 1937)	2000	President of the Community Foundation serving Boulder County; Democratic nominee for the U.S. Senate in 1990 and 1992; community activist and educator	
Susan Helms		(b. 1958)	2018	NASA Astronaut aboard the Space Shuttle Endeavour	
Sumiko Hennessy		(b. 1937)	1989	Founding board member and executive director of the Asian Pacific Development Center in Denver	
Laura Hershey		(1962–2010)	2016	Author, activist and advocate for the disabled community.	
Gloria J. Higgins		(b. 1950)	2024	Entrepreneur and advocate for early childhood education	
Arlene Hirschfeld		(b. 1944)	2006	Community leader, philanthropist, and activist	
Elizabeth Hoffman		(b. 1946)	2024	20th president of the University of Colorado System	
Elsa Holguín			2024	President and CEO of the Denver Preschool Program	
Julia Archibald Holmes		(1838–1887)	2014	First woman to climb Pikes Peak	
Dorothy Horrell		(b. 1951)	2018	Chancellor of CU Denver	
Velveta Golightly-Howell		(b. 1957)	2020	Colorado Deputy District Attorney	
Ding-Wen Hsu		(b. 1948)	2012	Co-founder and majority shareholder of Pacific Western Technologies	
Swanee Hunt		(b. 1950)	1997	Founding director of the Women and Public Policy Program (WAPPP) at the Kennedy School, and former United States Ambassador to Austria	
Elizabeth Wright Ingraham		(1922–2013)	2014	Architect	
Helen Hunt Jackson		(1830–1885)	1985	Writer who became an activist on behalf of improved treatment of Native Americans by the U.S. government	
Frances Wisebart Jacobs		(1843–1892)	1987	School teacher and philanthropist who founded the United Way and National Jewish Hospital	
Susanne E. Jalbert		(b. 1951)	2022	Veteran global activist using economic development to create equitable and safe lives for women in more than 50 countries	
Kristina Johnson		(b. 1957)	2014	Optoelectronic processing systems, 3D imaging, and color management systems	
Jean Jones		(b. 1942)	2006	President and CEO of Girl Scouts – Mile Hi Council	
Jo Ann Cram Joselyn		(b. 1943)	2002	First woman and first American to serve as secretary general for the International Union of Geodesy and Geophysics	
Lula Lubchenco Josephson		(1915–2001)	2024	Pioneering pediatrician	
Katherine Keating		(1922–2009)	2008	First woman in the United States Navy to rise from seaman recruit to captain	
Mary Ann Kerwin		(b. 1931)	2012	Co-founder of La Leche League International; women's health advocate	
Arlene Vigil Kramer		(b. 1938)	2016	Educator and pioneer of bilingual education	
Mary Krugman		(1943–2023)	2024	Nursing leader	
Dottie Lamm		(b. 1937)	1985	Former First Lady of Colorado, ran for the U. S. Senate against Ben Nighthorse Campbell	
Carlotta LaNier		(b. 1942)	2004	The youngest of the Little Rock Nine, a group of African-American students who, in 1957, were the first black students ever to attend classes at Little Rock Central High School in Little Rock, Arkansas. Now a Colorado real estate broker	
Mary Florence Lathrop		(1865–1951)	1987	Journalist and lawyer; first woman to try a case before the Colorado Supreme Court	
J. Virginia Lincoln		(1915–2003)	2000	Director of the World Data Center A for Solar-Terrestrial Physics	
Mary Elitch Long		(1856–1936)	1996	Businesswoman and one of the original owners of Elitch Gardens	
Fannie Lorber		(1881–1958)	2006	Founder of the Denver Sheltering Home	
Carolyn Love		(b. 1950)	2024	Educator and non-profit leader; owner of Kebaya Consulting and Coaching	
Joanne Maguire		(b. 1954)	2014	Aerospace engineer	
Mary Lou Makepeace		(b. 1940)	2008	Colorado Springs' first female mayor	
Portia Mansfield		(1887–1979)	2004	Along with Charlotte Perry, co-founder of the Perry-Mansfield Performing Arts School & Camp	
Philippa Marrack		(b. 1945)	2010	Biologist known for her research into T cell development, T cell apoptosis and survival, adjuvants, autoimmune disease, and for identifying superantigens, the mechanism behind toxic shock syndrome.	
Ramona Martinez		(b. 1943)	2010	Businesswoman and former president of the Denver City Council; member of the Democratic National Committee since the 1990s	
Fay Matsukage		(b. 1955)	2018	Corporate and securities lawyer	
Martha Maxwell		(1831–1881)	1985	Self-educated naturalist and artist who helped found modern taxidermy	
Frances McConnell-Mills		(1899–1974)	1996	Denver's first city toxicologist and perhaps the first female forensic pathologist in the United States	
Hattie McDaniel		(1895–1952)	2010	American actress and first African-American to win an Academy Award for her role in Gone with the Wind	
Golda Meir		(1898–1978)	1985	Teacher, kibbutznik and politician who became the fourth Prime Minister of Israel	
Ellis Meredith		(1865–1955)	2018	Accomplished journalist who led Colorado's suffrage movement	
Mary Miller		(1842–1921)	2002	Founded the city of Lafayette, Colorado	
Sue Miller		(1934–2017)	2002	Fashion model and breast cancer survivor who founded the Sue Miller Day of Caring	
Mary J. Mullarkey		(1943–2021)	2012	Colorado Supreme Court Chief Justice	
Reynelda Muse		(b. 1946)	1997	First woman and first African-American to anchor a newscast in Colorado	
Carol Mutter		(b. 1945)	2004	First woman in the United States Armed Forces (USMC) to be promoted to both major general and lieutenant general	
Marianne Neifert		(b. 1948)	2020	Physician, breast feeding expert	
Lily Nie		(b. 1963)	2008	Founder of Chinese Children Adoption International, Chinese Children Charity Fund, and the Joyous Chinese Cultural School	
Rachel Bassette Noel		(1918–2008)	1996	African American educator, politician and civil rights leader; namesake of Rachel B. Noel Middle School	
Gale Norton		(b. 1954)	2020	United States Secretary of the Interior, Attorney General of Colorado	
Susan O'Brien		(1939–2003)	2010	First female television news director in Denver	
Katharine Stegner Odum		(1905–2005)	2022	Champion for the students at the Amache Japanese-American "relocation" camp during World War II	
B. LaRae Orullian		(b. 1933)	1988	Founding president and chief executive officer of the Women's Bank in Denver	
Owl Woman		(1828–1847)	1985	Cheyenne princess who managed relations between Native American tribes and Anglo American men	
Elizabeth Pellet		(1887–1976)	2016	First woman minority leader in Colorado State Legislature.	
Lydia Peña		(b. 1934)	2016	Catholic nun, educator and author who champions education for girls in Afghanistan and Ghana; founding member of the Rose Community Foundation	
Julie Villiers Lewis McMillan Penrose		(1870–1956)	2022	Philanthropist and Patron of the Arts	
Charlotte Perry		(1889–1983)	2004	Along with Portia Mansfield, co-founder of the Perry-Mansfield Performing Arts School & Camp	
Antoinette Perry-Frueauff		(1888–1946)	2004	Actress and director	
Helen White Peterson		(1915–2000)	1986	First Native American woman director of the National Congress of American Indians	
Anna Petteys		(1892–1970)	2008	First woman to be elected to the Colorado Board of Education	
Sarah Platt-Decker		(1855–1912)	1990	Suffragette and advocate for women's rights	
Doreen Pollack		(1921–2005)	2018	Developed protocol to teach deaf children to listen and talk	
Lydia Prado		(b. 1960)	2022	Mental health care advocate	
Amache Prowers		(1846–1905)	2018	Cultural mediator who bridged Native American and Western cultures	
Agnes Ludwig Riddle		(1865–1930)	2022	Groundbreaking politician, farmers' advocate, human rights advocate	
Jane Silverstein Ries		(1909–2005)	1990	First female landscape architect in Denver	
Mary Rippon		(1850–1935)	1985	One of the first women to become faculty at a university; taught at the University of Colorado in Boulder	
Patricia Barela Rivera		(b. 1947)	2022	Advocate for women through the promotion of public policy changes	
Cleo Parker Robinson		(b. 1948)	1989	Choreographer and artistic director of the Cleo Parker Robinson Dance Ensemble	
Helen Ring Robinson		(1878–1923)	2014	Journalist, suffragist, and the first woman elected to the Colorado State Senate	
Pauline Short Robinson		(1915–1997)	2000	First African-American librarian in Denver	
Josephine Roche		(1886–1976)	1986	Humanitarian, industrialist, activist, and politician	
Sandra I. Rothenberg		(b. 1943)	2016	Appellate court judge and sex discrimination litigation pioneer	
Eliza Routt		(1839–1907)	2008	Suffragist and Colorado's first First Lady alongside John Routt	
Florence Sabin		(1871–1953)	1985	Medical scientist. She was a pioneer for women in science; she was the first woman to hold a full professorship at Johns Hopkins School of Medicine, the first woman elected to the National Academy of Sciences, and the first woman to head a department at the Rockefeller Institute for Medical Research. In her retirement years, she pursued a second career as a public health activist in Colorado, and in 1951 received a Lasker Award for this work.	
Minnie Josephine Reynolds Scalabrino		(1865–1930)	2022	Journalist who advocated for women's suffrage	
Hazel Schmoll		(1890–1990)	1985	Colorado botanist who conducted the first systematic study of plant life in Southwestern Colorado	
Gail Schoettler		(b. 1943)	2018	44th Lieutenant Governor of Colorado	
Pat Schroeder		(1940–2023)	1985	Democratic politician who represented Colorado in the United States House of Representatives from 1973 to 1997	
Bartley Marie Scott		(1896–2023)	2010	Rancher and conservationist	
Shari Shink		(b. 1948)	2016	Attorney, advocate for abused and neglected children. Founded the Rocky Mountain Children's Law Center	
Mary G. Slocum		(1851–1933)	2022	Champion of post-secondary education for women	
Eudochia Bell Smith		(1887–1977)	1986	Newspaper editor, Colorado legislator, and registrar of Denver's US District Land Office	
Susan Solomon		(b. 1956)	2006	Atmospheric chemist working for the National Oceanic and Atmospheric Administration	
Caroline Spencer		(1861–1928)	2006	Suffragist and physician	
Vivien Spitz		(1924–2014)	2006	Court reporter at the Nuremberg War Crimes Trials	
Agnes Wright Spring		(1894–1988)	2022	Author, librarian, and trailblazing historian for women and western history	
Jacqueline St. Joan		(b. 1945)	2024	Attorney, judge, law professor, child advocate and writer	
May Bonfils Stanton		(1883–1962)	1985	Philanthropist	
Anne Steinbeck		(1929-2025)	1985	First Colorado woman to serve as president of the National Federation of Business and Professional Women's Clubs	
Ruth Stockton		(1916–1990)	1985	Legislator; first woman president pro-tem of the Colorado State Senate	
Elizabeth Hickok Robbins Stone		(1801–1895)	1988	Ran the first hotel in the Fort Collins area, serving Overland Trail travelers. She financed and initiated businesses to support the growth in and around the area.	
Augusta Tabor		(1833–1905)	1991	Entrepreneur, first wife of silver king Horace Tabor	
Baby Doe Tabor		(1854–1935)	1985	Second wife of Colorado businessman Horace Tabor and inspiration for the opera The Ballad of Baby Doe	
Gloria Tanner		(1935–2022)	2002	First African American woman to serve in the Colorado State Senate	
Alice Bemis Taylor		(1877–1942)	2010	Philanthropist	
Arie Parks Taylor		(1927–2003)	2004	Public servant and community leader	
Jill S. Tietjen		(b. 1954)	2010	Author, electrical engineer	
Mary Luke Tobin		(1908–2006)	1997	American Roman Catholic Religious Sister	
Olibama Lopez Tushar		(1906–2004)	2022	Author and historian of Hispanic culture	
Martha Urioste		(1937–2022)	2000	Montessori educator	
Marilyn Van Derbur		(b. 1937)	1996	1958 Miss America pageant holder and founder of the American Coalition for Abuse Awareness and One Voice	
Judith Wagner		(b. 1943)	2016	Co-founder of both the Colorado Women's Foundation and the Women's Bank	
Lenore E. Walker		(b. 1942)	1987	Founder of the Domestic Violence Institute	
Diana Wall		(1943–2024)	2014	Soil invertebrate diversity expert	
Mildred Pitts Walter		(b. 1922)	1996	Author, activist, educator, and women's advocate	
Emily Howell Warner		(1939–2020)	2002	First woman hired as a pilot by a major U.S. airline	
Wilma Webb	Wilma_Webb_and_Wellington_Webb_(cropped)	(b. 1944)	1991	Member of the Colorado State Legislature from 1980 to 1993; the first First Lady of Denver to have held political office herself	
Zita Weinshienk		(1933–2022)	2000	United States federal judge	
Elizabeth Georgiana Barratt Wells		(1854–1921)	2022	Advocate for the welfare of mothers and children	
Rhea Woltman		(1927–2021)	2008	Pilot and one of the First Lady Astronaut Trainees for the Mercury project	
Hannah Marie Wormington		(1914–1994)	1985	Archaeologist and author; first woman to obtain a doctorate in anthropology at Harvard and the first archaeologist and first woman to receive a Guggenheim Foundation fellowship	
Jean Yancey		(1914–2000)	1985	Women's small business consultant and motivational speaker	
Mildred Didrikson Zaharias		(1911–1956)	2008	Athlete who achieved outstanding success in golf, basketball, and track and field. She was named the 10th Greatest North American Athlete of the 20th Century by ESPN, and the 9th Greatest Athlete of the 20th Century by the Associated Press.	

== Notes ==
=== References ===
- Browman, David L. (2013). Cultural Negotiations: The Role of Women in the Founding of Americanist Archaeology. Lincoln, NE: University of Nebraska Press. ISBN 978-0-8032-4381-1.
- Mead, Rebecca J. (2004). How the Vote Was Won: Woman Suffrage in the Western United States, 1868–1914. New York, NY: New York University Press. ISBN 0-8147-5676-X.
- O'Connell, Agnes N.; Russo, Nancy Felipe (1990). Women in Psychology: A Bio-Bibliographic Sourcebook. New York, NY: Greenwood Press. ISBN 0-313-26091-5.
- Robertson, Janet (2003). The Magnificent Mountain Women: Adventures in the Colorado Rockies. Lincoln, NE: University of Nebraska Press. ISBN 0-8032-3892-4.
- Tinling, Marion (1986). Women Remembered: A Guide to Landmarks of Women's History in the United States. New York, NY: Greenwood Press. ISBN 0-313-23984-3.
- Woolum, Janet (1998). Outstanding Women Athletes: Who They Are and How They Influenced Sports in America (2nd ed.). Phoenix, AZ: Oryx Press. ISBN 1-57356-120-7.
