= Senator Stockton =

Senator Stockton may refer to:

== Members of the United States Senate ==
- John P. Stockton (1826–1900), U.S. Senator from New Jersey from 1865 to 1866 and 1869 to 1875
- Richard Stockton (senator) (1764–1828), U.S. Senator from New Jersey from 1796 to 1799
- Robert F. Stockton (1795–1866), U.S. Senator from New Jersey from 1851 to 1853

== United States state senate members ==
- Ruth Stockton (1916–1990), Colorado State Senate
- William Stockton (politician) (1918–1985), Florida State Senate
