= Velveta Golightly-Howell =

First Black female prosecutor in Colorado

- Born: 1957 (age 68–69); Tuscaloosa, Alabama
- Education: Tuskegee Institute, University of Colorado Law School
- Spouse: John L. Howell

Velveta Golightly-Howell (born 1957) was Colorado's first Black female prosecutor.

== Biography ==
Velveta Golightly was born in 1957 in Tuscaloosa, Alabama to parents Lonnie and Marie Golightly.

Golightly-Howell was among the first Black students to integrate public schools in Alabama. Watching Governor George Wallace bodily prevent Black students from entering a white school affected her deeply, and influenced her choice to become a lawyer and dedicate her life to civil rights.

She took courses at University of Alabama while she attended the Tuskegee Institute. She visited her older sister who was an army officer stationed at Fitzsimmons Army Base, and decided to make Colorado her home.

Golightly-Howell received her Juris Doctor from University of Colorado School of Law, where she was one of two Black students in her class. She is the eighth Black woman to graduate from CU Law school.

During her time at law school, she accepted a prominent one-year internship with the Denver District Attorney's Office alongside future governor of Colorado Bill Ritter. After graduating, she was appointed to be Colorado's first African American female Deputy District Attorney.

She was the first Vice President of the National Association of Black Women Attorneys, and founded the Colorado chapter of the organization. She served on the board of directors of the Women's Bar Association.

She went on to work for the U.S. Department of Health and Human Services (HHS) as the second African American Chief Regional Civil Rights Attorney in the Office of General Counsel. She eventually moved up to be a regional manager of the Office for Civil Rights with HHS.

In 2014, she was appointed Director of Civil Rights for the U.S. Environmental Protection Agency, and reported to Administrator Gina McCarthy. She left the position in 2017 after injuries sustained in a car accident.

She founded Sister-to-Sister: International Network of Professional African American (Black) Women. She is part of Jack and Jill of America.

She is a Member-At-Large Board Member of the Colorado American Civil Liberties Union.

=== Personal life ===
She is married to John L. Howell, and they have two sons.

== Recognition ==
In 2020, she was awarded the Mary Lathrop Trailblazer Award by the Colorado Women's Bar Association.

In 2021, she was inducted into the Colorado Women's Hall of Fame.
