= Sue Miller (cancer activist) =

American fashion model, breast cancer activist, counselor and author

- Born: March 7, 1934; Kansas City, Missouri, US
- Died: May 29, 2017 (aged 83); Denver, Colorado, US
- Burial place: Mt. Nebo Cemetery
- Education: University of Denver (BA, MA)
- Occupation(s): Fashion model, breast cancer activist, counselor, author
- Years active: 1953—2010s
- Spouse(s): Alan S. Miller; Alan "Skip" Sigman; Harold Cohen
- Children: 3
- Awards: Colorado Women's Hall of Fame, 2002

Natalie Sue Miller (March 7, 1934 – May 29, 2017) was an American fashion model, breast cancer survivor, breast cancer activist, counselor, and author. Born in Kansas City, Missouri, she moved to Denver, Colorado at age 19 as a newlywed and started a career in fashion modeling. After being diagnosed with breast cancer at the age of 34 and undergoing a mastectomy, she created a fashion show featuring models who had also had breast cancer. In 1981, she founded the Sue Miller Day of Caring, a non-profit organization for breast cancer education and awareness. In its first 35 years, the Day of Caring has been a resource for over 17,500 survivors of breast cancer, providing educational forums and support services at its annual event, held in nine U.S. cities. Miller earned her bachelor's and master's degrees at age 60 and 75, respectively, and wrote her autobiography, I'm Tougher Than I Look, in 2004. In 2002, Miller was inducted into the Colorado Women's Hall of Fame.

== Early life and marriage ==
Miller was born March 7, 1934, in Kansas City, Missouri. Her family moved several times during her childhood due to her father's work; she spent her teen years in Oklahoma City, Oklahoma. In 1953, at age 19, she married Alan Miller and they moved to Denver.

== Modeling career ==
Miller first appeared as a model in a television ad for a local store when she was 13. She was offered a contract to model for a Neiman Marcus store in Dallas when she was 17, but her parents did not want her to move to Texas. After she and her husband moved to Denver, she signed with the John Robert Powers modeling agency and with JF Images and had a successful career.

== Breast cancer survivor and activist ==
I wanted to let people know that surviving breast cancer doesn't just mean living, it means living well.

–Sue Miller

At age 34, she was diagnosed with breast cancer and underwent a bilateral mastectomy. At that time, breast cancer was perceived as fatal and even contagious, and Miller stopped receiving modeling jobs due to the scarring. When she was asked by a woman in a prosthesis store to put together a fashion show for them, she agreed on a condition: all the models must be women who had had breast cancer. She and five other women did a "Survivors Fashion Show" for bridge clubs and luncheons; she distributed cards reading, "Cancer is not catching and we're still beautiful".

At a show in the Jewish Community Center in 1980, she met Joan Camp, a nurse who was trying to spread breast cancer awareness, and decided to add an educational aspect to the fashion show. In 1981, they mounted the first Day of Caring. It included the fashion show, a boutique, a resource center, discussion groups, seminars and workshops, a silent auction, and the sale of handicrafts to benefit the organization. Day of Caring was the first nonprofit to be established for breast cancer awareness and education in Colorado.

The Day of Caring became an annual event, held in nine cities in the United States. By 2017, the Day of Caring was drawing thousands of attendees and the organization had reached out to more than 17,500 patients and survivors of breast cancer with educational forums and support services. Miller headed the organization until 2002, when she suffered a mild stroke. After her death in 2017, the organization merged with the Cancer League of Colorado.

In the 1970s, Miller established a Denver telephone network called Pre-surgical Partners, which connected breast cancer survivors with breast cancer patients to offer friendship and support during the treatment process. On the legislative front, Miller lobbied for a state bill requiring health care organizations to offer mammograms to women over 40, which successfully passed, and for the federal government to fund breast cancer research.

== Education ==
At the age of 60, Miller earned her B.A. in human services at the University of Denver. At age 75, she earned her M.A. in counseling psychology and counselor education at the same institution. She did her internship with The Denver Hospice and then opened a private counseling practice.

== Awards and honors ==
In 2002, Miller was inducted into the Colorado Women's Hall of Fame. She has also received the Arthritis Foundation's Sabin Award, given in memory of Florence R. Sabin to someone who has benefited the health of people in Colorado. She received the Bea Romer Women's Health Leadership Award, given by the Colorado Women's Health Campaign; and the Jacque Mattson Volunteer Award, given by the Denver affiliate of the Susan G. Komen Race for the Cure.

== Personal life ==
Miller had three children with her first husband, Alan S. Miller (1932–1995), who predeceased her. She was widowed from her second husband, Alan "Skip" Sigman (1931–2005). She married Harold Cohen in January 2006; he survived her.

She died on May 29, 2017, at the age of 83, in Denver, Colorado.

== Bibliography ==
- Miller, Sue (2006). I'm Tougher Than I Look: The Sue Miller Story. Williams Cohen Press. ISBN 978-1599754697.
