= Julia Archibald Holmes =

American journalist

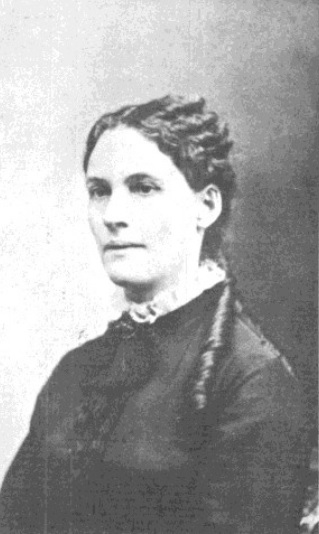
- Julia Archibald Holmes, circa 1870
- Born: February 15, 1838; Noel, Nova Scotia, Canada
- Died: January 19, 1887 (aged 48)
- Occupation: Journalist
- Spouse: James H. Holmes (m. 1857)

Julia Annie Archibald Holmes (February 15, 1838 – January 19, 1887) was an American suffragist, abolitionist, mountaineer and journalist. She was the first woman to climb Pikes Peak.

== Biography ==
Holmes was born in 1838 in Noel, Nova Scotia, Canada, and moved to Massachusetts with her family in 1848. Her father, James Archibald, was an abolitionist, while her mother Julia was a strong supporter of women's suffrage. The Archibald family relocated again in 1854 to Lawrence, Kansas, to assist in the abolitionist efforts sparked by the Kansas–Nebraska Act (see Bleeding Kansas); their Kansas home served as part of the Underground Railroad. In 1857, she married James H. Holmes, an abolitionist whom she had met through her father's friend John Brown.

Julia and James Holmes traveled to the Rocky Mountains in Colorado in 1858 with a group of gold miners. When the party arrived at the foot of Pikes Peak, the Holmeses decided to attempt to climb the mountain with J. D. Miller and George Peck. They reached the summit on August 5, 1858, making Julia Holmes the first woman to have climbed Pikes Peak. From the summit, she wrote in a letter to her mother: "Nearly everyone tried to discourage me from attempting it, but I believed that I should succeed; and now here I am, and I feel that I would not have missed this glorious sight for anything at all."

After climbing Pikes Peak, Holmes and her husband moved to Taos, New Mexico, where she worked as a correspondent for the New York Herald Tribune. She had four children before divorcing her husband in 1870 and relocating to Washington, D.C., where she worked in the Spanish Correspondence Division of the Bureau of Education, the first woman member, eventually advancing to the division chief.

Holmes was heavily involved in the women's suffrage movement in the 1860s and 1870s. She was a secretary for the National Woman Suffrage Association and spoke at the first National Woman Suffrage Association convention in 1869. She was involved in setting up associations for the movement in Washington, D.C., and, to aid the suffrage campaign, she attempted to register to vote in 1871. She was a friend of Susan B. Anthony.

Holmes died in 1887. She was posthumously inducted into the Colorado Women's Hall of Fame in March 2014.
