= Fannie Lorber =

Russian-born philanthropist and community activist

Fannie Eller Lorber (October 4, 1881 – June 9, 1958) was a Russian-born philanthropist and community activist. She founded the Denver Sheltering Home for Jewish Children, later known as the National Home for Jewish Children.

She was born in Geishen, a shtetl near Odessa, and came with her family to the United States in the early 1890s, settling in the West Colfax neighborhood of Denver, Colorado in 1896.

In 1902, she married Jacob Lorber, who owned a show business and later served in the state legislature. They had two sons.

In 1907, with her friend Bessie Willens, she founded the Denver Sheltering Home to look after the children of tuberculosis victims, many of whom came to Denver because of its sunshine and clean air. She served as its president for the rest of her life. In 1920, she set up a national fundraising office in New York City and established a chain of auxiliaries across the country to help support the Home. When a vaccine was developed in the late 1940s which virtually eliminated tuberculosis, the home began treating children with chronic asthma.

Lorber died in Denver at the age of 76.

She was inducted into the Colorado Women's Hall of Fame in 2006.

The Home eventually merged with the National Jewish Hospital and Research Center to become National Jewish Health.
