= Terri H. Finkel =

American pediatric rheumatologist and immunologist

- Born: 1953 (age 72–73); United States
- Education: Stanford University; Harvard University; University of Colorado
- Occupations: Immunologist; Pediatric rheumatologist
- Awards: Colorado Women's Hall of Fame

Terri H. Finkel (born 1953) is an American pediatric rheumatologist and immunologist who is the Children's Foundation of Memphis Endowed Chair and tenured professor of pediatrics at the University of Tennessee Health Science Center (UTHSC) and St. Jude Children's Research Hospital. Previously, she was the pediatrician-in-chief, chair of pediatrics and chief scientific officer at Nemours Children's Hospital. She is known for her research into autoimmunity, AIDS, juvenile rheumatoid arthritis, lupus, and cancer. Her work has been recognized in more than 200 publications, 10 U.S. patents, and 4 licensed technologies. Finkel has been placed in the top one percent of American pediatric rheumatologists by U.S. News & World Report. Her numerous honors include being named among America's Top Doctors by Castle Connolly every year since 2011 and induction into the Colorado Women's Hall of Fame in 1996.

== Biography ==
Finkel earned her medical degree from Stanford University in 1982, and received a PhD in biochemistry/biophysics at the same university two years later. After she completed a pediatric internship and residency at Harvard University and the University of Colorado, she went to National Jewish Health and Children's Hospital Colorado to do specialty training in pediatric rheumatology, where she greatly enhanced the general public's knowledge of autoimmunity, HIV/AIDS, juvenile rheumatoid arthritis, lupus, and cancer. She directed two research laboratories and oversaw the care of 400 children.

Finkel was inducted into the Colorado Women's Hall of Fame in 1996 for her work on researching T-cells. She also received awards from the American Cancer Society, American College of Rheumatology, Arthritis Foundation, Henry Kunkel Society, Gates Foundation, American Foundation for AIDS Research, Howard Hughes Medical Institute, the Lupus Foundation of America and the Pediatric AIDS Foundation.

In 1999, Finkel was recruited by the Children's Hospital of Philadelphia to be their Division Chief of Rheumatology, and was the Joseph Lee Hollander Endowed Chair of Pediatric Rheumatology and tenured professor of pediatrics at the Perelman School of Medicine at the University of Pennsylvania. She was attracted to the job as her grandmother had died from rheumatic fever, and Finkel wanted to ensure other people would not suffer similar effects. In 2011, she was recruited by the Nemours Foundation to lead the construction of Nemours Children's Hospital, where she focused on personalized medicine, which allows doctors to choose treatments suited to their patients. She led the development of a successful research enterprise across five institutions. She was recruited in 2020 as the Associate Chair of the Department of Pediatrics and tenured professor of pediatrics at the University of Tennessee Health Science Center and St. Jude Children's Research Hospital. Here she leads national and international research efforts on the use of big data, genomics, and artificial intelligence to address the causes and cures of rare diseases afflicting children and families worldwide. In 2024, she was became the Interim Chair of the Department of Pediatrics at the University of Tennessee Health Science Center as well as Pediatrician in Chief at Le Bonheur Children's Hospital.

Finkel established strategic partnerships with several area hospitals, academic establishments, and a research enterprise, and has had over 60 clinical research studies in progress and external research that have generated more than $6 million worth of funding. She has authored over 168 peer-reviewed medical papers across multiple academic and scientific journals. Her name was entered into the Congressional Record in 2014 when her biography was read in the House of Representatives to honor her leadership and contributions in the field of healthcare. U.S. News & World Report placed her among the top one percent of pediatric rheumatologists in the United States for the four years preceding 2014.

Finkel's paradigm-changing papers have been published in Nature and Nature Medicine. She has lectured internationally and nationally, including at the NIH, Institutes of Medicine, Imperial College of London, and Institute Pasteur. Finkel was a founding member of CARRA, the Childhood Arthritis Research and Rheumatology Alliance, which has led the U.S. in driving clinical research in pediatric rheumatology. She has served on the board of directors of One Day the Family AIDS Project, on the advisory board for the University of Central Florida College of Engineering and Management Systems, and is a director of the UCF Research Foundation Board.
