= Fannie Mae Duncan =

African-American businesswoman, activist, and philanthropist

- Born: July 5, 1918; Luther, Oklahoma
- Died: September 13, 2005 (aged 87); Denver, Colorado
- Occupations: Entrepreneur, philanthropist, and community activist
- Awards: Colorado Women's Hall of Fame, 2012

Fannie Mae Duncan (July 5, 1918 — September 13, 2005) was an African-American entrepreneur, philanthropist, and community activist in Colorado Springs, Colorado. She is best known as the proprietor of the Cotton Club, an early integrated jazz club in Colorado Springs named for the famous club in Harlem.

In 2012, Duncan was inducted into the Colorado Women's Hall of Fame. She was recognized for "her courageous stand fostered the peaceful integration of Colorado Springs."

== Early life ==
Fannie Mae Bragg was born on July 5, 1918, in Luther, Oklahoma. Her parents, Herbert and Mattie Brinson Bragg, had worked as sharecroppers in Oklahoma. She was one of seven children, all of whom helped with the work. From an early age, Fannie Mae wanted to help at the farm stand and sell produce; her father encouraged this entrepreneurial inclination. In 1926, Herbert Bragg died from injuries sustained in an automobile accident.

Frances Bragg-Payne was the first sibling to arrive in Colorado Springs who then sent for the rest of her family. Her mother moved the family to Colorado in 1933, including her brother, Cornelius Bragg. Five years later, she was the first in her family to graduate from high school; she attended Colorado Springs High School.

== Career ==
External images
- Fannie Mae Duncan, Edward Duncan, and his family, The Gazette
- Fannie Mae Duncan's residence
- Fannie Mae Duncan at the Cotton Club
- Edeard R. Duncan, Fannie Mae Duncan's husband and co-founder of Duncan's Cafe and Bar

After she married Edward Duncan, Mrs. Duncan worked with the military in Colorado Springs during World War II. At Camp Carson, she opened a soda fountain at the facility established for African-American soldiers called Haven Club. Flip Wilson was stationed at the camp and Duncan said that she gave him his first chance to perform. She opened a United Service Organizations (USO) center, after convincing the city manager to issue her a business license, at a time when it was very rare for African-Americans, particularly African-American women, to own a business on base.

In 1948, Duncan opened The Cotton Club to serve people irrespective of their ethnic heritage. Her customers included soldiers and their brides. Among the notable people that played at the jazz club included Duke Ellington, Etta James, Lionel Hampton, Mahalia Jackson, Billie Holiday, Muddy Waters, and Count Basie. At the time, hotels in the city would not serve African-Americans and she bought a historic mansion to provide lodging for performers and other visitors, including Medgar Evers.

It was standard practice for blacks to enter restaurants through rear doors and sit in balconies of theaters. Duncan's business approach was that she wanted to serve people of color, while also serving white people. Denying whites admittance to the Cotton Club, she felt meant that she would be denying their constitutional rights. This raised objections among local authorities, but she took a stand and peacefully provided for integrated patronage of the club. One of the concerned individuals was I.B. Bruce, the police chief. Nicknamed "Dad", Bruce became a good friend of Duncans and was successful in ensuring that there was no trouble at the business. Duncan worked out a deal with Bruce wherein patrons were free to mingle without interference, and in return Duncan tipped them off if she saw a customer they were looking for. To ensure safety, Duncan did not serve people who had too much to drink or were making trouble; she also hired her own security. To promote inclusiveness, she had a permanent sign in the club's window, "Everybody's Welcome" Due to urban renewal, the club closed in 1975 and the club at a new location was unsuccessful.

== Civic activist ==
She was active in civic organizations, often the first woman to become a member. She donated the first iron lung in the city and was a fundraiser for medical research. She was cofounder of the Sickle Cell Anemia Association chapter in the city and the philanthropic 400 Club. Duncan provided for college educations and was a mentor and role model.

== Death and legacy ==
Duncan died on September 13, 2005, in Denver. Although she had no surviving children of her own, she maintained close relationships with many nieces and nephews. In her later years, she raised one of her nieces as her daughter from infancy into adulthood. Her husband, Edward Duncan, a porter for the railroad, died in 1957.

The annual multicultural event, "Everybody Welcome", honors Duncan's business and civic career. In 2012, Duncan was inducted into the Colorado Women's Hall of Fame. She was recognized for her role in fostering the racial integration.
