= Jo Ann Joselyn =

- Education: University of Colorado
- Awards: Colorado Women's Hall of Fame
- Scientific career
- Fields: Astrogeology
- Workplaces: National Oceanic and Atmospheric Administration
- Thesis: Elemental Composition and Ionization State of the Solar Atmosphere and Solar Wind (1978)

Jo Ann Cram Joselyn is an astrogeophysicist. She was the first woman to receive a doctorate from the University of Colorado's astrogeophysics program, and has advocated for the importance of women's leadership in the sciences.

== Education ==
Joselyn received her Ph.D. from the University of Colorado Boulder in Boulder, Colorado, US in 1978, M.S. from the University of Colorado, Boulder, 1967, Engineering, and B.S. from the University of Colorado, Boulder, 1965, Applied Mathematics. Her thesis at CU Boulder was titled "Elemental Composition and Ionization State of the Solar Atmosphere and Solar Wind."

== Career ==
From 1968 to 1999, she worked at the National Oceanic and Atmospheric Administration (NOAA) as a space scientist and space weather forecaster. Her work focused on documenting and predicting space weather, particularly solar flares, sunspots, and their impact on communications. Joselyn served as the Secretary General of the International Association of Geomagnetism and Aeronomy (IAGA) from 1997 to 1999, and as Secretary General of the International Union of Geodesy and Geophysics (IUGG) from 1999 to 2007. To date, she is the only woman who has held that role. She was inducted into the Colorado Women's Hall of Fame in 2002.

== Selected publications ==
- Nancy Crooker; Jo Ann Joselyn; Joan Feynman, eds. (1 January 1997). Coronal Mass Ejections. Wiley Online Library. Bibcode:1997GMS....99.....C. doi:10.1029/gm099. ISBN 978-1-118-66437-7. ISSN 0065-8448. Wikidata Q111634331.
- Y. Kamide; W. Baumjohann; I. A. Daglis; et al. (1 August 1998). "Current understanding of magnetic storms: Storm-substorm relationships". Journal of Geophysical Research. 103 (A8): 17705–17728. Bibcode:1998JGR...10317705K. doi:10.1029/98ja01426. ISSN 0148-0227. Wikidata Q59919382.
- Jo Ann Joselyn (1995). "Geomagnetic activity forecasting: The state of the art". Reviews of Geophysics. 33 (3): 383. Bibcode:1995RvGeo..33..383J. doi:10.1029/95rg01304. ISSN 8755-1209. Wikidata Q122206486.
