= Joanne M. Maguire =

American engineer and executive

- Born: January 1954 (age 72); Connecticut, United States
- Education: Michigan State University; University of California, Los Angeles
- Occupations: Engineer; Executive
- Years active: 1975–present
- Awards: Colorado Women's Hall of Fame

Joanne M. Maguire (born January 1954) is an American engineer and former executive. She is the former executive Vice President of Lockheed Martin Space Systems between 2006 and 2013. Maguire was also an officer of Lockheed Martin, the first woman to serve in such a role, and was inducted into the Colorado Women's Hall of Fame in 2014.

== Biography ==
Maguire was born in January 1954 in the state of Connecticut. She has eleven siblings. Maguire is of Irish descent. Her father, Michael F. Maguire, worked as an aerospace engineer for United Aircraft (now called United Technologies) subsidiary of Pratt & Whitney. Maguire studied electrical engineering at Michigan State University and graduated with a bachelor's degree. She was a member of the university's Honor College. She later graduated from University of California, Los Angeles with a master's degree in engineering. Maguire also went to UCLA Anderson School of Management where she was a graduate of their executive program in management, and completed the Harvard Program for Senior Executives in National and International Security.

She joined TRW in 1975 and became responsible in technical and management positions within the company. Her main area was space system design and development ventures. Maguire later became TRW's deputy and Vice President of Business Development in January 2000 where she was responsible for the company's business development function. She oversaw TRW's strategy formulation, program development, marketing and communications, technology development and discretionary investment. Maguire stood down from the role in March 2003. She joined Lockheed Martin Space Systems in the same month where she was their Vice President of Special Programs for four months. In her role, Maguire focused on United States national security space system developments considered sensitive.

She became the company's first Executive Vice President in July 2003, and was also the first woman to become an officer of Lockheed Martin. Maguire became the Vice President of Lockheed Martin Space Systems in 2006. She oversaw several space exploration endeavors and the development and production for human space flight systems, weather satellites. She left the company in May 2013.

== Impact and honors ==
Maguire helped to increase the number of women into leadership and executive positions and in the company's overall employees for Space Systems Company. She became a role model and mentor for younger women. Maguire became the first female recipient of the International von Kármán Wings Award from the California Institute of Technology in 2010. She was ranked 31 in Fortune's 50 Most Powerful Women in Business in 2012. Maguire had been previously named as the magazine's 50 Most Powerful Women in Industry in 2006 and 2007, and was listed as the Top 50 Women in Technology by Corporate Board Member magazine in 2008. Maguire was honored by Girls, Inc. for her accomplishment as a "leader and role model for young women" that same year, and was awarded the Outstanding Leadership Award by Women in Aerospace in 1999. She is one of few women who have been named as a fellow of the American Institute of Aeronautics and Astronautics. She was also elected a member of the National Academy of Engineering in 2011 for individual and team leadership of successful space programs. Maguire was inducted into the Colorado Women's Hall of Fame in 2014.
