= Maria Guajardo =

American educator and advocate

- Born: Maria Resendez Guajardo; 1959 (age 66–67); San Joaquin Valley, California, US
- Other names: Maria Guajardo Lucero
- Education: B.S. psychology and social relations, Harvard University, 1982; M.S. clinical psychology, University of Denver, 1985; PhD, clinical psychology, University of Denver, 1988
- Occupations: Educator, advocate for children and Latinos
- Years active: 1988—present
- Children: 1
- Awards: Colorado Women's Hall of Fame, 2010

Maria Guajardo Lucero (born 1959) is an American educator and advocate for children and the Latino community. Born to illiterate Mexican migrant workers in California, she earned her undergraduate degree in psychology and social relations at Harvard University and her master's degree and doctorate in clinical psychology at the University of Denver. From 1988 to 2013, she worked in several state and national government-level positions to increase opportunities for low-income children and Latinos, and served as executive director of the Latin American Research and Service Agency. In 2013 she moved to Tokyo, Japan, to develop a new degree program in international liberal arts at Sōka University. She served as dean of the program from 2013 to 2016, when she was promoted to vice president of the university (2016-2020). She is the recipient of numerous honors and awards, and was inducted into the Colorado Women's Hall of Fame in 2010.

== Early life and education ==
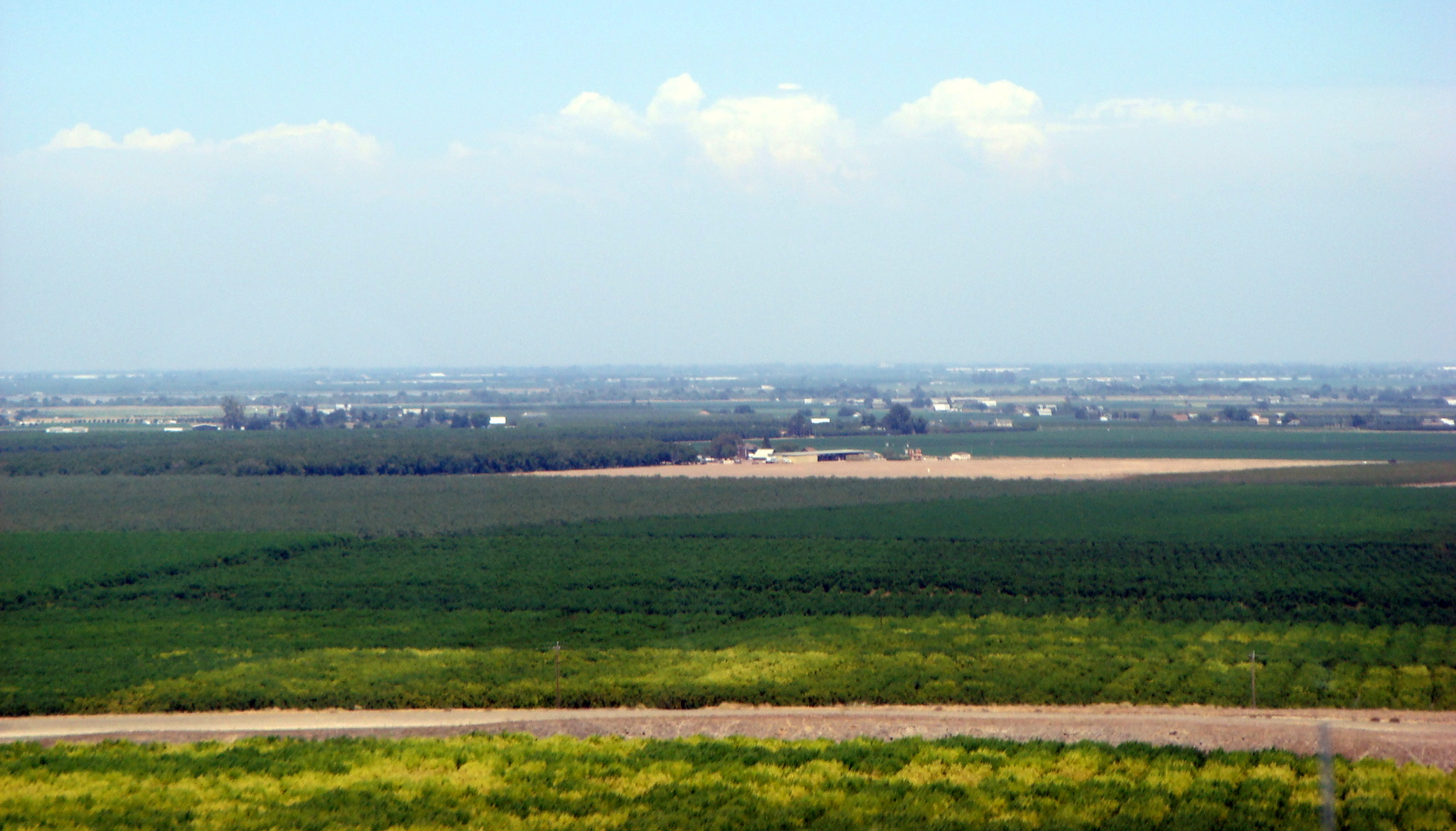
San Joaquin Valley

Maria Resendez Guajardo was born in 1959 to Mexican immigrant parents who were migrant workers in California. Guajardo was the fifth in a family of six children. Both her father, a former peasant farmer in Mexico, and her mother were illiterate. She grew up in migrant camps in the San Joaquin Valley and attended three different elementary schools. Though her home was Spanish-speaking, she was conversant in English by second grade. Her parents placed a strong emphasis on education, and took their children to the library to encourage reading. The family moved out of the migrant camps when the older children were ready to attend high school.

Following her junior year in high school, Guajardo joined a Massachusetts summer program that introduced her to several Ivy League colleges. She applied to–and was accepted at–all of them, ultimately choosing Harvard University for her undergraduate studies. She pursued her interests in children and education through extracurricular activities such as tutoring in an African-American high school and volunteer work at Massachusetts General Hospital. She earned her bachelor's degree in psychology and social relations at Harvard in 1982.

She received her master's degree in clinical psychology at the University of Denver in 1985, followed by a doctorate in clinical psychology from the same institution in 1988. For her doctoral dissertation, she studied the reasons for educational attainment and school dropout rate among Latina teens, focusing on the question, "What is it that allows students just like me to succeed in education?" Her research, which included interviews with approximately 600 students and their families, pointed toward "strong relationships with encouraging figures, particularly mothers" for those who succeeded in school, and dissatisfaction as early as elementary school for those who dropped out.

== Career ==
=== Government ===
I determined to make growing up easier for other children.

–Maria Guajardo

Guajardo's dissertation led to her hiring as the Dropout Prevention Coordinator at the Colorado Department of Education from 1988 to 1991. Among her achievements in this role were the receipt of a Kellogg National Fellowship to study "the role children have in creating world peace". She also traveled to international conferences to discuss the improvement of living conditions for children in developing countries.

From 1992 to 1997, Guajardo was executive director of the Latin American Research and Service Agency, a Latino political advocacy and community development organization. In this capacity, she opened a regional Latino public policy center. From 1997 to 2003, she served as executive director of Assets for Colorado Youth, a youth development agency.

In 2003, Mayor of Denver John Hickenlooper tapped Guajardo to become executive director of the Mayor's Office for Education and Children, a position she held for eight years. Guajardo helped promote a Denver preschool bill which provides access to high-level preschool options for four-year-old children from low-income families, and implemented the 5 by 5 Project, which provides children enrolled in the Head Start program with "five formative cultural experiences by the time they are 5 years old". Through another initiative, the Lights On After School Partnership, Guajardo enabled funding for more than 700 after-school programs servicing more than 50,000 students.

=== Teaching ===
Guajardo has frequently mentored young Latinas. From 2012 to 2013, she was a national speaker and trainer on the topics of "leadership, inclusive excellence, and racial healing".

In 2013, Guajardo moved to Tokyo, Japan, to develop a new degree program in international liberal arts at Sōka University. In 2013 she became a professor in that program, and also served as dean from 2013 to 2016. She was the first non-Japanese dean in that institution. From 2016-2020 she served as vice president of Sōka University.

In 2018, she was one of three finalists for the presidency of Fort Lewis College in Durango, Colorado.

== Affiliations and memberships ==
In 1992, President Bill Clinton named Guajardo to the Minority Mental Health panel, which studied the gaps in healthcare and resources among Latinos. Guajardo was a contributing editor to the U.S. Surgeon General's 2000 Report on Status of Mental Health of Minority Populations.

Guajardo has been a member of the board of trustees of Soka University of America and the University of Denver, being the first Latina on both these boards. She was also a board member and past board president of the Mental Health Center of Denver, Children's Hospital Colorado, the Denver Foundation, and the Veterans of Hope Project.

== Honors and awards ==
Among Guajardo's honors are the 1996 Sōka Gakkai Liberty Award, 1997 Sōka University Award of Highest Honor, 1997 Denver Women of Distinction Award from the Girl Scouts of Colorado, 2004 Gandhi King Ikeda Award from Morehouse College, 2006 National Women of Vision Award, 2008 Award for Municipal Excellence from the National League of Cities, and 2009 Martin Luther King, Jr. Humanitarian Award. She was honored by a Congressional Commendation for Education in October 2005. Guajardo was inducted into the Colorado Women's Hall of Fame in 2010.

== Personal life ==
Guajardo has one son, Santiago Rey Guajardo Lucero (born 1997). She has been a student and teacher of tai chi since 1983.
