= Katherine Keating =

American military servicewoman

Captain Katherine Keating
- Born: February 8, 1922; Pueblo, Colorado, United States
- Died: June 6, 2009 (aged 87); Beulah, Colorado
- Burial place: Beulah, Colorado
- Military career
- Allegiance: United States of America
- Branch: Navy
- Service years: 1942–1972
- Rank: Captain
- Unit: Navy Medical Service Corps
- Conflicts: World War II
- Awards: Meritorious Service Medal; U.S. Surgeon General's Certificate of Merit; Colorado Women's Hall of Fame
- Other work: Owner, KK Ranch and Carriage Museum

Katherine "Kay" Keating (February 8, 1922 – June 6, 2009) was an American military servicewoman, pharmacist, female veterans activist and business owner. She served with the Women Accepted for Volunteer Emergency Service (WAVES) in World War II and subsequently with the Navy Medical Service Corps. She achieved several milestones during her military career, including being the first female pharmacist in the US Navy, the first woman in the US Navy to advance in rank from seaman to captain, and the first female pharmacist to attain the rank of captain. After her retirement from active service, she operated a bed and breakfast and horse ranch in Beulah, Colorado. She was inducted into the Colorado Women's Hall of Fame in 2008.

== Early life and education ==
Katherine Keating was born in Pueblo, Colorado, on February 8, 1922, to Lawrence and Cecil Keating. She had one brother and one sister. In 1940 she graduated from Central High School and in 1942, from Pueblo Junior College. She enrolled at the University of Colorado but interrupted her studies to enlist in the WAVES in 1942. After World War II ended, she returned to the university and earned a B.S. in pharmacy studies in 1948.

== Military career ==
Upon enlisting in the WAVES in 1942, Keating trained as a radio operator and was posted to Hawaii, where she monitored radio signals and typed out code translations. She sometimes worked out of an underground station located in a pineapple field.

Back in Colorado after the war, she served in the United States Naval Reserve. In 1948 she re-enlisted in the navy to pursue a military career, and in 1950 became the first woman commissioned to the Navy Medical Service Corps.

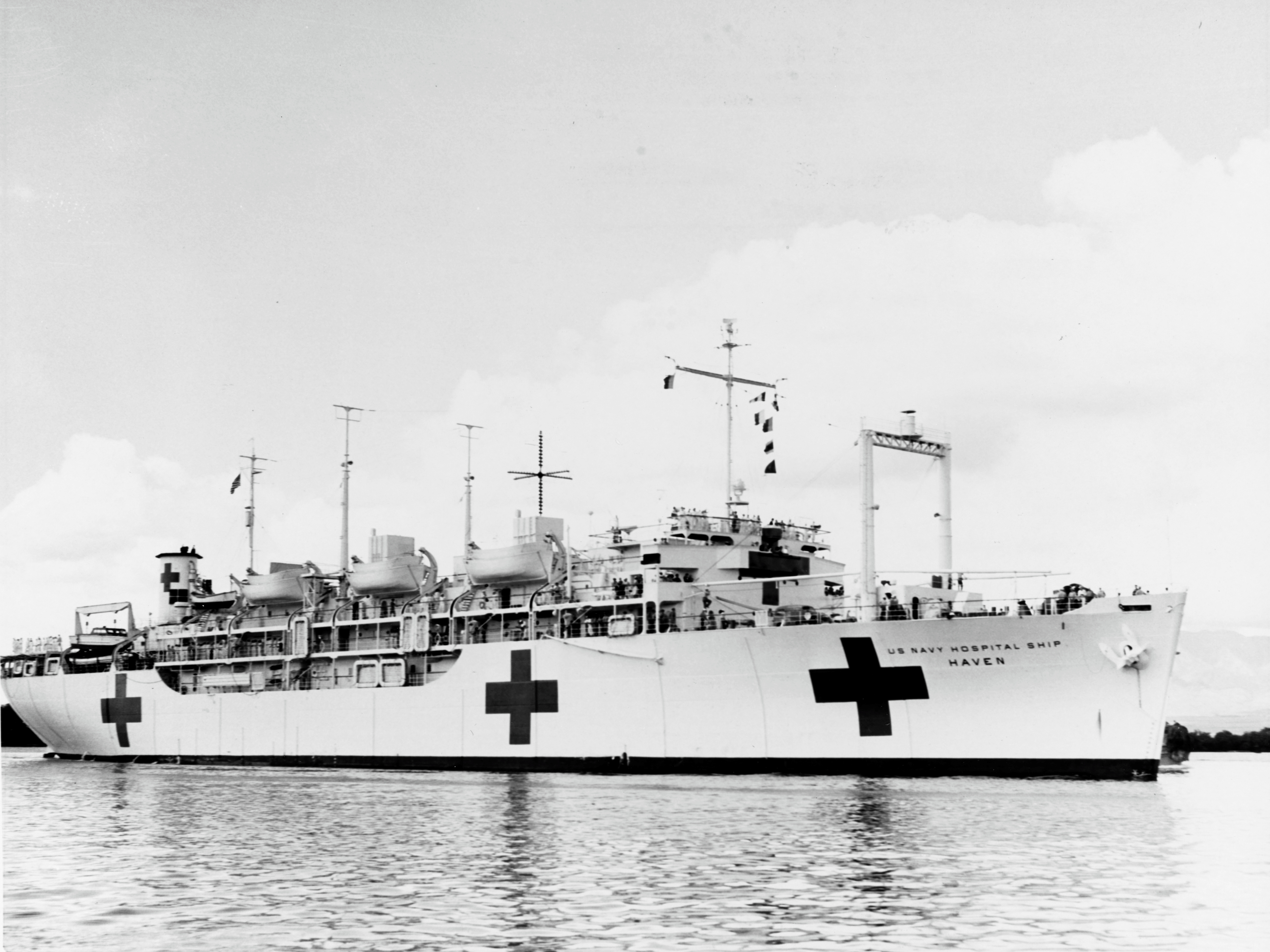
USS Haven anchored in Inchon Harbor, 1954

During the Korean War, Keating served on the USS Haven, a hospital ship which evacuated wounded American soldiers from Korea to US military hospitals in Japan. In addition to her pharmacist duties, Keating performed guard duty, cryptography, and officer training. In 1953, she served as an official "disinterested witness" for a prisoner of war exchange that took place aboard the ship under the auspices of the United Nations. In 1954, the ship evacuated wounded French Foreign Legion paratroopers after the Battle of Dien Bien Phu.

During the Vietnam War, Keating was assigned to U.S. naval hospitals in Japan.

Keating went on to serve as Chief of Pharmacy Service for six naval hospitals. She also lectured at the Pharmacy Technician School in San Diego, California.

She achieved several milestones during her tenure in the Navy Medical Service Corps, including being the first female pharmacist in the US Navy, the first woman in the US Navy to advance in rank from seaman to captain, and the first female pharmacist to attain the rank of captain. She was also "the first woman in the Medical Service Corps to go to sea, and the first woman officer to replace a male officer at sea". She retired from active service in 1972.

== Business owner ==
After leaving the navy, Keating settled in Beulah, Colorado, where she ran a bed and breakfast and horse ranch called the KK Ranch and Carriage Museum. Her horse-drawn carriages were popular at parades, weddings, and funerals. A display of her carriages and gear is featured at the Pueblo Heritage Museum.

Keating also worked for recognition of female veterans. In the 1990s, she was the biggest fund-raiser for the Colorado section of the Women in Military Service for America Memorial established at Arlington National Cemetery.

== Awards and honors ==
Keating's military honors include the Meritorious Service Medal and the U.S. Surgeon General's Certificate of Merit as a pharmacist.

The City Council of Pueblo declared March 24, 2006, as "Kay Keating Day". Keating was inducted into the Colorado Women's Hall of Fame in 2008. Also in 2008, she was the honorary parade marshal for the Colorado State Fair.

== Personal life ==
Keating never married. At one point, while she was on active duty, she raised her sister's two children through their teenage years.

She died on June 6, 2009, in Pueblo. Her oral history on her experiences in three wars is part of the Katherine Keating Collection at the Veterans History Project of the Library of Congress.

== Sources ==
- Stark, Alan; Hanson, Carl; Ilse, Travis, eds. (1996). Absolutely Every (Almost) Bed and Breakfast in Colorado (4th ed.). Travis Ilse Publishers. ISBN 1882092198.
- Witt, Linda; Bellafaire, Judith; Granrud, Britta (2005). A Defense Weapon Known To Be Of Value: Servicewomen of the Korean War Era. UPNE. ISBN 1584654724.
