= Martha Urioste =

Bilingual Montessori educator in Denver, Colorado (1937-2022)

Martha M. Urioste
- Born: October 2, 1937; Raton, New Mexico
- Died: December 8, 2022 (aged 85); Denver, Colorado
- Education: Loretto Heights College; Texas Tech University; University of Colorado Boulder
- Occupations: Educator; Montessori school principal; founder of Family Star

Martha Urioste (2 October 1937 – 8 December 2022) was a 20th-century American educator. Known as "La Madrina de Montessori," Urioste founded the first Montessori education in the Denver Public School system. She was a strong advocate for bilingual education, and taught Spanish to students in the classroom and on local television.

== Biography ==
Urioste was born on October 2, 1937, in Raton, New Mexico, to Mack and Nattie Urioste.

She graduated from Loretto Heights College in 1957, and Texas Tech University in 1958. She earned her doctorate in Counseling and Multicultural Education from University of Colorado Boulder.

She worked at Gilpin Elementary school as a first grade teacher. She held many roles in various schools in the Denver Public School system, and continued on to be a middle school Spanish teacher, a counselor at West High School, and Assistant Principal at North High School.

Urioste was assigned to address the high school dropout rates of Hispanics at North High School in Denver. Upon realizing that there was a deeper problem causing dropout that started earlier than high school, and after a presentation by Madame Elizabeth Caspari using the Montessori Bells (seen in Montessori sensory materials) she knew the Montessori approach could help. She put in a request to be a principal, and her first assignment was to a school in Northeast Denver, Mitchell Elementary. Writing in Multicultural Inclusion in an Urban Setting, Urioste said she believed introducing a Montessori programme at the school would improve integration by building interest and trust in education. She traveled to Rome, Italy to meet with Montessori colleagues. She brought back this model and asked to work in an elementary school to implement the new program.

When Urioste worked at Mitchell Elementary, she implemented the first Montessori style education in the Denver Public School system. This intervention made an impact on student education, and Urioste continued with the Montessori model. At the time, the IOWA tests at Montessori were the highest in the district. The school was so successful that in 1995, it was used as a demonstration of Denver's school integration success from court-ordered busing.

Urioste founded Family Star in 1988, which was a national 0–3 Early Head Start center using the Montessori model. This offered early childhood and parental education for low income families. Family Star started in a vacant apartment building in the Five Points neighborhood across the street from Mitchell Elementary. This intergenerational family center was one of the first Early Head Start sites, and has grown to two campuses with over 300 children.

Urioste taught Spanish on KRMA Channel 6 in Denver.

She developed foreign language and Hispanic culture classes. She was one of the first Hispanic-American counselors in DPS, and was the second bilingual coordinator.

=== Death and legacy ===
Urioste died on December 8, 2022.

Her papers are part of the Denver Public Library Western History and Genealogy collection.

== Published works ==
- Urioste, Martha M.; Moore, Amy Clarke (2016). The Family Star Story: The Community-Led Transformation of an Abandoned Building into a Montessori Infant-Toddler-Parent Education Center in Northeast Denver. Edgewater, Colorado: Great Work Publishing. ISBN 978-0-692-61020-6. OCLC 987571440.
- Urioste, M. (2014). Multicultural Inclusion in an Urban Setting. The NAMTA Journal, 39(3), https://files.eric.ed.gov/fulltext/EJ1183203.pdf

== Recognition ==
- 2000, Colorado Women's Hall of Fame
- 2011, Champion of Change, Escuela Tlatelolco
- 2017, Honorary Ph.D from Regis University
- 2018, Colorado Latino Hall of Fame Luminary
- 2018, NEWSED Community Development Corporation Civil Rights Award
