= Dana Hudkins Crawford =

American architectural preservationist (1931–2025)

- Born: Dana Hudkins; July 22, 1931; Salina, Kansas, U.S.
- Died: January 23, 2025 (aged 93)
- Occupation: architectural preservationist
- Years active: 1965–20??
- Known for: Larimer Square, Union Station
- Spouse: John W. R. Crawford III (married on October 12, 1955)

Dana Hudkins Crawford (July 22, 1931 – January 23, 2025) was an American architectural conservation developer and preservationist working in Denver, Colorado. She was involved in almost every renovation project in downtown Denver, from the initial designation of the LoDo District and creation of Larimer Square to the Union Station. She was recognized by her alma mater, Radcliffe College, for the Larimer Square project, was inducted into the Colorado Women's Hall of Fame, and in 2013 the hotel at the restoration project of Union Station was renamed as the Crawford Hotel in honor of her contributions to preserve the history of Denver.

== Life and career ==
Dana Hudkins was born on July 22, 1931, in Salina, Kansas. She graduated from Monticello College and then went on to complete her undergraduate degree at the University of Kansas in 1953, where she was a member of Pi Beta Phi. From there, she enrolled in Radcliffe College and studied Business Administration, graduating in 1954. That same year, she moved to Denver, Colorado and began working in a public relations firm. In 1955, she married a geologist, John W. R. Crawford III, and they subsequently had four sons.

In the early 1960s, when the Lower Downtown (LoDo) area of the 1400 block of Larimer Street was being proposed for demolition, Crawford organized a group of investors to buy the property for a potential retail redevelopment project. They formed an organization called Historic Denver, Inc. with the goal of preserving Denver's architectural heritage and save the Molly Brown House. There was strong opposition to the preservation movement from the Denver Urban Renewal Authority as well as community opposition from those who thought that designating the area as a preservation district would limit new development in the area. Finding financing was another hurdle, as many banks did not want to lend to a woman. She surmounted the problem by obtaining financing from the New York Life Insurance Company. After about 10 years of planning, in 1971, Denver's first Historic District, Larimer Square, was launched. She received a Radcliffe Alumnae Recognition Award for her successful development of Larimer Square.

After completing the Larimer Square project, Crawford started work on Union Station neighborhood but worked alone for nearly 30 years. In the interim, she worked on preservation of the Oxford Hotel, LoDo's Millennium retail office project, two Flour Mill Loft redevelopment ventures, the Ice House, Coors Field, and others. In 1996, she was inducted into the Colorado Women's Hall of Fame for her preservation and development of downtown Denver. The Flour Mill Loft Project, completed in 1999, was one of Crawford's personal favorites, as it was "the first residential project in the Platte Valley".

In 2008, several investors got together and a plan was formed to design, finance and build a transit system linked to Union Station. The station itself was accepting proposals and Crawford put together a team, which they called the Union Station Alliance, to make a bid. They won the project in December 2011 and a 99-year lease on the station and set about obtaining approval from the National Park Service to make alterations to the historic site. After a year, approval was attained, the consortium changed equity partners and the development got underway. In 2013, the hotel within Union Station, was renamed the Crawford Hotel in Crawford's honor as a way to recognize her contributions to the revitalization of downtown Denver.

Crawford died on January 23, 2025, at the age of 93.

== Sources ==
- Varnell, Jeanne; Hanson, M. L. (1999). Women of Consequence: The Colorado Women's Hall of Fame. Boulder, Colorado: Big Earth Publishing. ISBN 978-1-55566-214-1.
