= Ramona Martinez =

American businesswoman

Ramona Martinez (born September 1943) a member of the Democratic National Committee from Colorado for 16 years. A businesswoman and former president of the Denver City Council, Martinez has served on the DNC from 1992 to 2009. As a superdelegate to the 2008 Democratic National Convention, Martinez has publicly supported Bill Richardson, and then Hillary Clinton. She was inducted into the Colorado Women's Hall of Fame in 2010.

== Biography ==
Active in politics since the 1970s, Martinez was named chair of the Colorado Voter Registration Project in 1976 and worked for the Denver, Colorado city council. In 1987, she was elected to represent District 3 on the Denver City Council and served for a total of 16 years. During her tenure, she was elected the first Hispanic female city council president.

With her sister, Sara Barela, Martinez launched a successful travel agency. After leaving the Denver City Council, Martinez helped found REM Associates in 2003, a campaign management and public relations firm with corporate and political clients. Martinez is married; she and her husband, Lawrence, have three grown children: Larry, Laura, and Leonard.

Appointed as an at-large member of the Democratic National Committee during the Clinton administration, Martinez has been an active member of the DNC's Hispanic Caucus serving as vice-chair and later acting chair from February to November 2007; she was elected to head the Hispanic Caucus at the November 2007 DNC meeting.

Martinez has also served as secretary of the DNC Women's Caucus; and has been an executive committee member of the DNC since at least 2005. She has also served as Vice Chair of the Board of Directors for NALEO (National Association of Latino Elected and Appointed Officials) and as the first Chair of the Hispana Leadership Institute. In 2005, Martinez supported Howard Dean's successful bid to become DNC chairman.

As a member of the Democratic National Committee, Martinez has been a superdelegate to the 2000 and 2004 Democratic National Conventions, and will be a superdelegate to the 2008 Democratic National Convention. In 2007, she announced her intention to vote for New Mexico Gov. Bill Richardson; after he withdrew from the race in January 2008, she endorsed New York Sen. Hillary Clinton.

Although Martinez faced pressure to switch her convention vote to Illinois Senator Barack Obama after Obama won Colorado's caucus in February and became the Democrats' presumptive nominee in June, Martinez remained the lone holdout in the Colorado delegation to remain committed to Clinton as late as early August. Martinez supported Obama following the Democratic National Convention in August. She was later named to the Colorado Latino Advisory Council for Obama's campaign.
