= Anna Petteys =

American politician

Anna C. Petteys (1892–1970) was an American education activist, newspaper woman, lecturer and politician in the mid-20th century. She was inducted into the Colorado Women's Hall of Fame in 2008.

Born in 1892, she moved to Colorado in 1914 where she married Loronzo Petteys, with whom she had four children. After her son died in the Second World War, she set up a scholarship at Northeastern Junior College; originally a two-year scholarship for one person, it is now given to eleven young men each year. Her philanthropic work extended to include hospitals, libraries, women's shelters, volunteer fire departments, and much more, throughout most of northeastern Colorado.

In 1950 she won the first of three elections to the Colorado State Board of Education, serving as chairwoman for her last four years. Catching the attention of the White House, she was appointed to the Committee for Special Education and the Committee on Education for Migrant Children. She was also active in the United Nations, first having been selected to attend the United Nations Charter Convention in San Francisco, and later on appointment to the United Nations Commission on the Status of Women; it was during this time that she developed a relationship with Soong Mei-ling, the wife of Chiang Kai-shek.

With her son she opened up two newspapers, as well as a radio station, to serve northeastern Colorado.

In 1999, furnishings for the groundbreaking of a student center at Morgan Community College were provided by the Jack Petteys Memorial Foundation of Brush in memorial to Anna Petteys.
