= Erinea Garcia Gallegos =

American educator and postmistress

- Born: Erinea Garcia; 1903; Conejos, Colorado, US
- Died: 2002 (aged 98–99); San Luis, Colorado
- Occupations: Educator, postmistress
- Years active: 1920–1976
- Spouse: Maclovio Gallegos
- Children: 7
- Parent(s): José Amarante García; Teodora Espinosa de García
- Awards: Colorado Women's Hall of Fame, 2012

Erinea Garcia Gallegos (1903–2002) was an American educator and postmistress. Born in Conejos, Colorado, her family had deep roots in the region, being among the first settlers of the San Luis Valley that overlaps southern Colorado and northern New Mexico. She taught in elementary schools before her marriage and afterward served as postmistress of San Luis for nearly four decades. She was posthumously inducted into the Colorado Women's Hall of Fame in 2012.

== Early life, family, and education ==
Erinea Garcia was born in Conejos, Colorado, in 1903. Her father, José Amarante García, had eight children from his first wife, Sofia Espinosa de García. After Sofia's death, he married her sister, Teodora Espinosa de García, who bore him four children, including Erinea.

Antecedents on both her father's and mother's sides were among the first settlers in the San Luis Valley that overlaps southern Colorado and northern New Mexico, establishing farms and towns on Mexican land grants. After Colorado was admitted to the Union in 1876, Garcia's grandfather served in the state legislature. Her father was the sheriff of Conejos County for 19 years and was also a two-term Conejos County judge.

Garcia attended elementary school in Conejos and then entered the Loretto Academy for Girls in Pueblo. In 1921 a flood ravaged the town and the school was closed. Garcia went on to graduate from the high school in Antonito. She was among the first Hispanic women in Colorado to attend college. She took courses at Adams State University, Western State Colorado University, and the University of Utah, earning a teaching certificate.

== Career ==
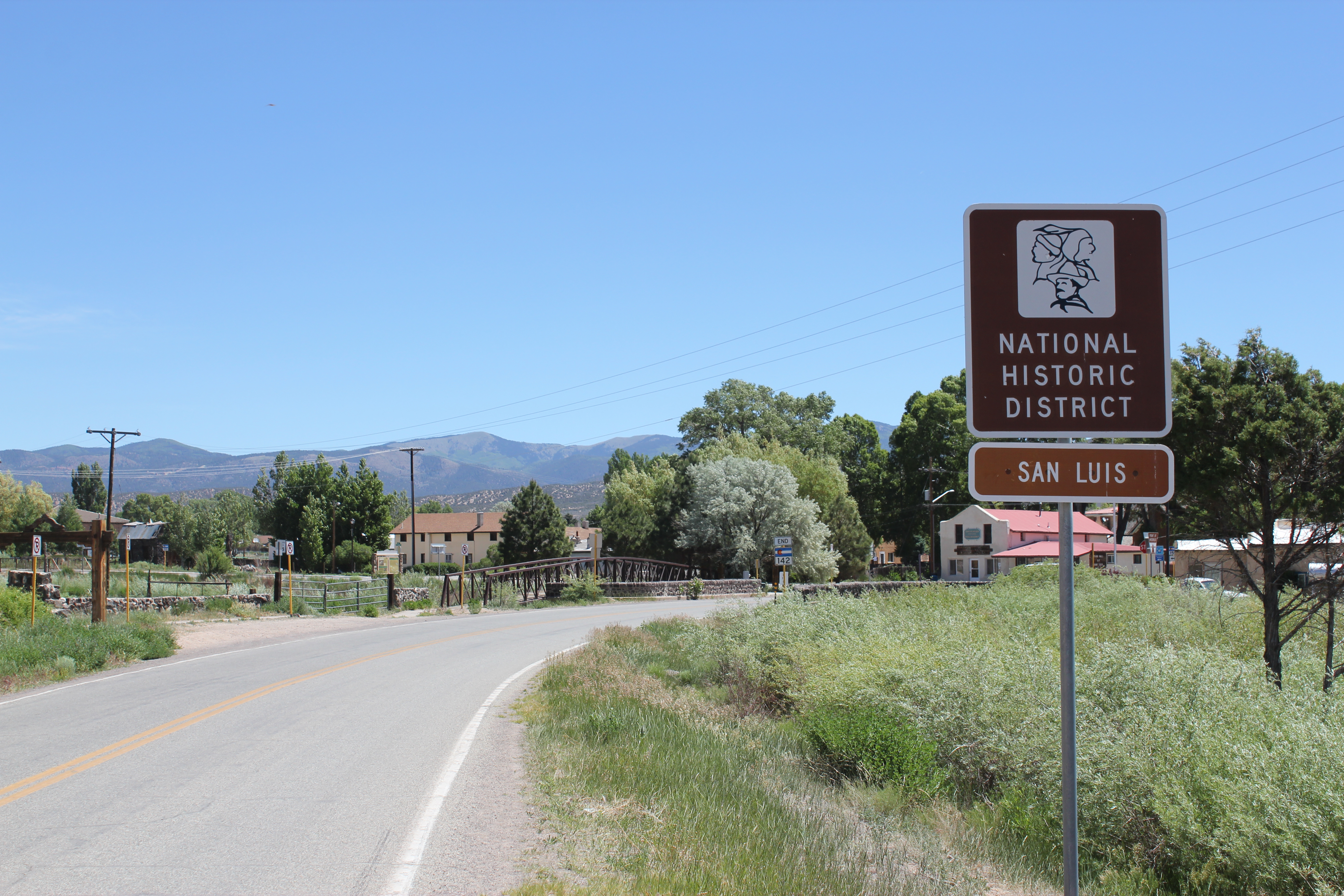
Plaza de San Luis de la Culebra Historic District

For 12 years, Garcia worked as a teacher in elementary schools in Conejos, San Luis, and other towns in the San Luis Valley. She also was a school principal. In 1932 she married and left her job to raise a family. In 1935, President Franklin D. Roosevelt appointed her postmistress of San Luis.

She and her husband moved into a Gallegos family-owned house adjacent to the post office building on Main Street in San Luis. Dating from the early 1860s, this house had been part of a farm and grain mill complex owned by Nasario Gallegos, Ceran St. Vrain, and Harvey Easterday. Known as the Gallegos-Easterday House, it is part of the Plaza de San Luis de la Culebra Historic District, which was listed on the National Register of Historic Places in 1976. A post office permit had been requested by Easterday in 1860 so the grain mill would have its own mailing address. When Garcia Gallegos and her family arrived, the post office building was also owned by the Gallegos family.

Garcia Gallegos was the postmistress of San Luis for nearly four decades. During World War II and other battles which saw local men stationed overseas, she assisted post-office patrons with writing and translating letters, and issued money orders. Upon her retirement in 1976, her daughter took over as postmistress.

== Honors ==
Garcia Gallegos was posthumously inducted into the Colorado Women's Hall of Fame in 2012. Her family also established the Erinea and Maclovio Gallegos Scholarship Fund at Adams State University.

== Personal life ==
She married Maclovio Gallegos, a native of San Luis, in 1932. They had seven children. Garcia Gallegos died in 2002.
