= Carolína González =

First owner of Mexican American restaurant in Denver

- Born: February 18, 1894; El Paso, Texas
- Died: May 8, 1996 (aged 102); Denver, Colorado
- Occupations: Businesswoman and advocate
- Spouse: Ramon González

Carolína Acuña Díaz González (1894–1996) was a businesswoman and activist in the Denver Latinx community. In the 1950s, she opened "Casa Mayan," a prominent restaurant and community gathering space.

== Biography ==
González was born in El Paso, Texas, on February 18, 1894.

=== Early life ===
Ramon Gonzalez's family moved from Chihuahua, Mexico, to El Paso, Texas, during the Mexican Revolution in the 1910s. Ramon and Carolína migrated to southern Colorado and then Denver in 1918 and lived in the Auraria neighborhood.

=== Denver and the Casa Mayan ===
González created a safe haven during the Depression for youths who were "riding the rails" to Colorado.

In the 1934, Ramon and Carolína purchased 1020 9th Street in Denver, Colorado. This was the oldest clapboard house built by Dr. William Smedley in 1872. Their home was known for their generous hospitality. In the 1940s, their neighborhood was one that was redlined by the City of Denver to delineate cultural minority neighborhoods and prevented investment and development.

In 1946, the family home evolved into the Casa Mayan restaurant, which was one of the first Latinx-owned Mexican American restaurants in Denver. The restaurant was renowned for its embodied elements of Mexican hospitality and generosity. It became a "mutualista" or refuge for immigrants in Colorado.

Casa Mayan became a cultural center for artists, musicians, athletes, politicians, and architects, and advocacy groups like the West Side Coalition. Diners included Tex Ritter, William Shirer, Andrés Segovia, Marian Anderson, Paul Robeson, and many prominent locals. The restaurant became a kind of salon. President Harry Truman ate at the Casa Mayan in 1948.

Casa Mayan closed in 1974 by the Denver Urban Renewal Authority when the neighborhood was razed to build the Auraria Campus. The home was spared demolition and declared a landmark later that year. González moved from Auraria to Athmar Park, where there was no sense of community.

=== Marriage and children ===
Carolína married Ramon González in the 1910s–1920s. Ramon died in 1960.

At the time of her death, she was survived by her children: sons Ralph, Ramon and Arnold; four daughters, Maria Zimmermann, Belen Aranda and Marta Alcaro, and Celia Chia; 29 grandchildren; 40 great-grandchildren; and several great-great-grandchildren.

=== Death and legacy ===
Her former residence is now part of the National Register of Historic Places in Denver. It is one of the oldest remaining homes in the area, as most of the neighborhood was demolished for the Auraria Campus.

In 2006, Gregorio Alcaro and Trini H. González cofounded the Auraria Casa Mayan Heritage organization to protect the memory and community awareness of the cultural heritage of the area.

In 2020, González was inducted to the Colorado Women's Hall of Fame for her advocacy.

== See also ==
- Auraria Campus
- Auraria, Denver
- Chicano movement
- National Register of Historic Places listings in Colorado
