= Lydia Peña =

Nun, artist, and educator in Denver, Colorado (born 1934)

- Born: December 4, 1934; San Mateo, New Mexico
- Education: Loretto Heights College
- Occupations: Sister of Loretto, artist and art historian

Lydia M. Peña (born 1934) is an artist and art historian, and is a Sister of Loretto. She was inducted into the Colorado Women's Hall of Fame for her work in education.

== Biography ==
Lydia M. Pena was born in San Mateo, New Mexico. She attended boarding school at St. Vincent's Academy High School in Albuquerque, New Mexico.

She graduated from Loretto Heights College with a B.S. in dietetics in 1955.

She entered the Sisters of Loretto after graduating, and became a nun. She attended religious training in Nerinx, Kentucky.

== Education and career ==
Peña taught at St. Mary's Academy in Denver from 1958 to 1965. She then worked at Loretto Heights College as the chair of the Art Department from 1965 to 1988, and became a full professor in 1986.

In 1963, she earned her first master's degree in education from St. Louis University, and followed with a second master's degree in art history from University of Denver in 1968.

She earned her PhD in Art History from Union Institute and University, and completed her dissertation at the Smithsonian American Art Museum. Her dissertation focused on artist Agnes Tait McNulty and her work at the National Collection of Fine Arts at the Smithsonian. She also created a traveling exhibit and a catalog about the artist.

In 1988, Peña worked at Regis University as a faculty advisor and instructor in the University Without Walls program, teaching art history, religious studies, and philosophy. She then worked in fund raising and endowment as Director of Special Gifts.

Pena has been active in the Colorado Catholic Community. She was on the board of the Rose Community Foundation, Rocky Mountain PBS, the Women's Forum, and on the Blue Ribbon Committee for the Design of Denver International Airport. She was Chair of the Mayor's Commission on Cultural Affairs and President of the Loretto Community from 1995 to 2001.

In 2012, Peña curated an exhibit on the 200th anniversary of the founding of the Sisters of Loretto at Denver Public Library.

== Published works ==
- Peña L. M. (1983). The life and times of Agnes Tait 1894-1981. Arvada Center for the Arts and Humanities ; Roswell Museum and Art Center. ISBN 9780961298203

== Recognition ==
In 1999, she was honored as a Woman of Distinction from the Girl Scouts of Colorado.

In 2007, she received Regis University's Civis Princeps award.

In 2016, Peña was inducted into the Colorado Women's Hall of Fame.

In 2019, Regis University awarded her an honorary doctorate.
