= Joy S. Burns =

American businesswoman (1927–2020)

- Born: Joy Steelman; December 2, 1927
- Died: July 17, 2020 (aged 92); Denver, Colorado
- Education: University of Houston
- Occupations: Businesswoman, philanthropist

Joy S. Burns (December 2, 1927 – July 17, 2020) was the president and CEO of the D.C. Burns Realty and Trust Company and the owner of the Burnsley Hotel. She was involved in the Denver, Colorado, community and served on a number of boards. Burns was also involved with the University of Denver.

She graduated with a business degree from the University of Houston.

Burns died on July 17, 2020, at age 92.

== Career ==
Burns was President of the Burnsley Hotel from 1985 through 1993.

In 1995, Burns became President and CEO of the D.C. Burns Realty and Trust Company.

Burns was on the board of:

- University of Denver Board of Trustees
- Denver Metro Convention and Visitor's Bureau (now Visit Denver)
- Sportswomen of Colorado, Inc.
- Denver Center for the Performing Arts
- Metropolitan Football Stadium District

Burns was also a founder of the Women's Bank in 1976 (changed to Colorado Business Bank in 1993) and the Women’s Foundation of Colorado, in the 1980s.

== Recognition ==
She was inducted into multiple Colorado halls of fame:

- 1997 - University of Denver Athletic Hall of Fame
- 1998 - Colorado Business Hall of Fame
- 1999 - Colorado Tourism and Travel Hall of Fame
- 2000 - Colorado Women's Hall of Fame

== University of Denver involvement ==
Burns's work with the University of Denver started in 1972 when she began volunteering with the Women's Library Association. In 1981, she joined the board of trustees. Nine years later she became chairman of the board, becoming the first woman to hold the post. She was a trustee for 30 years and supported the Joy Burns Arena at the Ritchie Center and the Joy Burns Plaza in the Newman Center for the Performing Arts. In addition, she supported the Franklin L. Burns School of Real Estate and Construction Management, named after her late husband. She was the recipient of the 2005 DU Josef Korbel Humanitarian Award and the 2008 award for Distinguished Service to the university.

== Links ==
- Colorado Business Hall of Fame
- Daniels College of Business: Burns School History
