= Vivien Spitz =

American court reporter

- Vivien Spitz, from a photo taken during the Nuremberg trials.
- Born: Vivien Ruth Putty; 1924; Montana
- Died: April 1, 2014; Texas
- Notable work: Court reporter at the Nuremberg trials (1946-1948); court reporter in the United States House of Representatives (1972-1982)

Vivien Spitz (1924 – April 1, 2014), born Vivien Ruth Putty, was an American court reporter at the Nuremberg trials after World War II. From 1972 to 1982, she was Chief Reporter of Debates in the United States House of Representatives.

== Early life ==
Vivien Ruth Putty was born in Montana and raised in Woodstock, Illinois. She supported herself, her widowed mother Kathryn Putty and two younger siblings as a switchboard operator in her teens, before World War II, and learned to take dictation to improve her job prospects. During the war, she graduated from Gregg College in Chicago, where she trained as a court reporter.

== Career ==
Putty worked as a court reporter in Detroit after completing her training in Chicago. From 1946 to 1948, she was a civilian employee of the United States Army, assigned to the Subsequent Proceedings trial at Nuremberg, to transcribe the testimony of twenty Nazi doctors and their assistants. "I just had the feeling that I never saw such evil faces in my life, and eyes," she recalled. She later experienced recurrent nightmares from the overwhelming images she transcribed.

Spitz became a court reporter in Denver, and was the first woman to serve as Official Reporter of Debates in the United States Senate. For ten years, from 1972 to 1982, she was Chief Reporter of Debates for the United States House of Representatives. She was a fellow of the Academy of Professional Reporters of the National Court Reporters Association.

In retirement, Spitz lived in Aurora, Colorado. In the mid-1980s, she was outraged by reports of a local school teacher calling the Holocaust a hoax. She joined the University of Denver Holocaust Awareness Institute's Speakers Bureau, and toured as a lecturer, speaking to community groups about the Nuremberg trials. She helped to found the University of Colorado Holocaust Contemporary Bioethics Program.

Spitz published a memoir, Doctors from Hell, The Horrific Account of Nazi Experiments on Humans (2005). In 2006, Spitz was inducted into the Colorado Women's Hall of Fame.

== Personal life ==
Vivien Putty married Ellis Spitz, a military police officer she met in Nuremberg. They had two sons, John and Peter. Spitz died in Texas in 2014, aged 89 years. In 2017 she appeared in older footage in the documentary Caring Corrupted: The Killing Nurses of the Third Reich. There is a collection of items donated by Spitz, including transcripts and photographs, in the United States Holocaust Memorial Museum Archives.
