= Olibama Lopez Tushar =

Colorado historian (1906-2004)

- Born: January 2, 1906; Manassa, Colorado, United States
- Died: January 19, 2004 (aged 98); Denver, Colorado, US
- Education: University of Colorado Boulder, University of Denver
- Occupations: Historian and educator
- Notable work: The People of El Valle
- Spouse: Frederick Tushar

Olibama Lopez Tushar (1906 – 2004) was an American scholar of Hispanic heritage in Colorado. Her book, The People of El Valle, is influential in the history and genealogy of the San Luis Valley.

== Biography ==
Olibama Lopez was born on January 2, 1906, at Los Rincones near Manassa, Colorado. Her parents were Fernandez B. Lopez and Josefina Manzanares, and she had one brother. She descended from Spanish settlers from New Mexico that migrated to the San Luis Valley in 1849 as part of the Sangre de Cristo Land Grant. When she was 6 years old in 1912, her family moved to Zarephath, New Jersey, before returning to the San Luis Valley within 2 years.

Her family moved to Denver, Colorado, to give her a better education, where they attended private school. The family spent the school year in Denver and returned to Mogote, Colorado, during summers.

Lopez Tushar graduated as valedictorian from Belleview High School in 1924. She attended Belleview Junior College, where she taught Spanish in exchange for tuition. In 1926, she and her brother attended University of Colorado Boulder. She was one of the first Hispanic graduates of University of Colorado Boulder. She received her bachelor's degree in education. Tushar then attended the University of Denver as one of, if not the first, Hispanic woman to earn a master's degree from the institution. She further developed her thesis, "The Spanish Heritage in the San Luis Valley," into her later book The People of El Valle.

In 1940, Lopez Tushar was recruited by the superintendent of Walsenburg Public Schools as a teacher for her cultural knowledge and connection with Hispanic students. During her time at Huerfano High School, she sponsored the Spanish Club and supported a student production of "El Fandango." The school continued to put on this show every spring, and celebrated the 50th anniversary of the production in 1990.

In 1942, Lopez Tushar was drafted into the war effort as a deputy acting censor in El Paso, Texas.

In 1945, she returned to Denver to become a translator for Gates Rubber Co., N.O. Nelson Export Co., and Dana Kepner Co.

She was a member of Phi Alpha Kappa, a sorority for businesswomen. She was a member of the Territorial Daughters of Colorado. She was a very involved volunteer with the Genealogical Society of Hispanic America.

She retired in 1961, but continued to tutor individuals and groups in three languages.

=== Personal life ===
In 1950, she met Frederick Tushar, and they married a year later. They remained together until Frederick died in 1988.

Lopez Tushar spoke six languages: Spanish, Portuguese, Italian, Latin, French, and English.

=== Death and legacy ===
Lopez-Tushar died on January 19, 2004, in Wheat Ridge, Colorado.

Lopez Tushar's work has influenced the genealogy and historical record of southern Colorado. Her book, The People of El Valle, was based on her master's thesis. She was unable to find a publisher, so she self-published the book and sold 5,000 copies. This title has been used in numerous college and university courses, and is cited by many histories since then. The first edition was endorsed by the Colorado Centennial-Bicentennial commission. The Denver Post's review in 1976 called the book a "paper-bound gem."

== Published works ==
- The People of El Valle: A History of the Spanish Settlers in the San Luis Valley

== Recognition ==
In 2003, she was honored with The Lena L. Archuleta Community Service Award by Denver Public Library.

A bronze bust of Lopez Tushar is in the Gates Western History Reading Room of the Denver Public Library.

The Olibama Lopez Tushar Hispanic Legacy Research Center in Denver is named for her.

In 2019, she received the Legacy Award from The Latino Hall of Fame.

She was inducted into the Colorado Women's Hall of Fame in 2022.
