= Geraldine Grimes =

Educator in Denver, Colorado (1950–2022)

- Born: September 17, 1950; Aurora, Colorado
- Died: May 11, 2022 (aged 71); Denver, Colorado
- Occupation: Educator

Geraldine "Gerie" Grimes (née Butler, 1950–2022) was an educator and activist in Denver, Colorado, who advocated for better education for Black children and children with disabilities. She was CEO and president of Hope Center, and was inducted into the Colorado Women's Hall of Fame in 2018.

== Biography ==
Geraldine Butler was born on September 17, 1950, in Aurora, Colorado, to parents retired master sergeant Alonzo and Elizabeth Jane Butler. She was one of seven children. She graduated from East High School in Denver in 1968.

Grimes received her undergraduate degree in non-profit administration from Metropolitan State University in 1987. She received her graduate degree in non-profit management from Regis University in 2001.

Grimes married Kenneth Grimes and the couple were married for 52 years. They had two sons, Troy Del Ray and Aaron Dion Grimes. She and her family lived in the Park Hill neighborhood, where she focused much of her activities.

Grimes is best known for her work with Hope Center, where she served as president and CEO. She joined the organization in 1982 as a bookkeeper in the vocational program. The organization serves children and adults who are labeled "at risk" by the state for their developmental disabilities. She worked for the organization for 36 years.

For 45 years, she was involved with numerous other community organizations, including: Center for African American Health, Denver Early Childhood Council, Holly Area Redevelopment Project (HARP), Falcon Youth Organization, and Colorado Special Olympics Volunteer.

She also had leadership roles in organizations; she spent two terms as the president of the Metropolitan State University Alumni board, was president of the Colorado Black Roundtable and the Colorado Black Women for Political Action.

In 2009, she was a Ph.D candidate and Buell Fellow at University of Denver.

Grimes died on May 11, 2022.

== Recognition ==
- 2013, Anna Jo Haynes Caring About Kids Award from Mile High United Way
- 2013, the Mary McLeod Bethune Legacy Award from the National Council of Negro Women
- 2013, Martin Luther King Jr. Peace Award from Metropolitan State University of Denver
- 2014, William Funk Award for Building Stronger Communities from Colorado Nonprofit Association
- 2018, Colorado Women's Hall of Fame
- 2022, Denver Preschool Program Legacy Award
