= Lily Nie =

Lily Nie (born 1963) is the founder of Chinese Children Adoption International, which has overseen the international adoptions of over 10,160 Chinese children. She was inducted into the Colorado Women's Hall of Fame in 2008.

== Life and education ==
Lily Nie was born in Yingkou in 1963. She earned a law degree from Fushun University. She moved to the United States in 1987 to marry her fiancé, Joshua Zhong. She and her husband relocated to Colorado from South Carolina in 1988, when her husband received a scholarship to Denver Seminary. In the 1990s, she began working on a master's degree in business administration, and earned it in 1994 from the University of Phoenix. She also has a degree in human resources management from Colorado Christian University. She and her husband also had a baby boy and girl. Both she and her husband became United States citizens in 1999.

== Career and activism ==
Nie became a business law attorney in China after receiving her law degree. After relocating to the United States, she became interested in activism for vulnerable children after being taught English from a couple that was raising four adopted children. When she and her husband had to relocate to Colorado, she enrolled in the Spring International Language Institute and worked as a maid and taught Mandarin Chinese to afford her tuition. In 1992, the laws in China changed to let foreigners adopt Chinese children. She founded Chinese Children Adoption International with her husband. In 1994, she helped adopt 20 Chinese children living in orphanages and relocated them to Colorado homes. In 1995, Nie made five trips to China and facilitated the adoption of 140 children. Chinese Children Adoption International is now the largest China-only adoption agency in the world. The organization has also paved the way for addressing the care of children in Chinese orphanages, and increasing Chinese governmental oversight of orphanages.

Nie created the Chinese Children Charity Fund to raise funds to care for Chinese children living in orphanages. The charity went on to open three orphanages in China, called Lily Orphan Care Centers, and helped to train orphanage care workers. After Chinese policy allowed foster care, the organization began to train foster care parents and families and helped to place children in foster homes in China. The organization actively places special-needs children in American homes, as well. They have also established bilingual Chinese agents in all provinces of China, and they help facilitate adoptions. In 1996, Nie started the Joyous Chinese Cultural School in Littleton, Colorado. The school was started to teach Chinese children the Chinese language and about Chinese culture. She also founded the ChinaRoots program, which helps lead heritage trips to China for adopted children and their families. She also aided in creating the Red Thread Counseling Center, which was the first counseling agency in the United States to help provide counseling and emotional help to adopted children and their adoptive families. Nie and her organization have also established charity programs for children too old to be placed with families.
