= Ding-Wen Hsu =

Colorado businesswoman and community leader (b. 1948)

- Born: 1948 (age 77–78); Taiwan
- Occupations: Businesswoman and community leader
- Spouse: Tai-Dan Hsu

Ding-Wen Hsu (born 1948) is a Taiwanese businesswoman in Denver, Colorado. She is the co-founder and current Director of Federal Facility Management Division of Pacific Western Technologies. She is one of the co-founders of the Colorado Dragon Boat Festival, one of the largest Asian festivals in the Rocky Mountains.

== Biography ==
Ding-Wen Hsu was born in Taiwan in 1948.

Hsu arrived in the US in 1976 with her husband Tai-Dan Hsu, who attended graduate school at the University of Iowa. Her husband received a job as hydrologist, and the family moved to Colorado in 1978.

Hsu became a US citizen in 1981.

Hsu co-founded Pacific Western Technologies, Ltd. with her husband in 1987.

== Advocacy ==
Hsu, John Chin and Howie Solow created the Colorado Dragon Boat Festival and held the first event in August 2001. This became the largest Asian festival in the Rocky Mountain area. They started the event with a grant for $1000 from the city of Denver.

Hsu is a national fellow of the Asian Pacific American Women's Leadership Institute.

== Personal life ==
Hsu is married to Tai-Dan Hsu.

== Recognition ==
Representative Ed Perlmutter gave a tribute to Hsu in the Colorado House of Representatives in 2007.

In 2011, Hsu was honored as one of the Asian American Heroes of Colorado by the Asian Chamber of Congress.

Hsu was inducted into the Colorado Women's Hall of Fame in 2012.

Regis University awarded the Civis Princeps award to Ding-Wen Hsu, an award for outstanding citizens of Colorado.
