= Virginia Fraser =

American rights activist (1928–2011)

- Born: Virginia Hart; September 30, 1928; Cleveland, Ohio, US
- Died: November 18, 2011 (aged 83); Colorado
- Education: B.A., Hiram College; M.A., speech communication, University of Denver
- Occupation: State Long-Term Care Ombudsman
- Years active: 1980–2001
- Awards: Colorado Women's Hall of Fame, 2002

Virginia H. Fraser (September 30, 1928 – November 18, 2011) was an American activist for human rights, women's rights, and elder rights. She was the Long-Term Care Ombudsman for the state of Colorado for more than two decades. She co-wrote several works on nursing home care and eldercare. She was inducted into the Colorado Women's Hall of Fame in 2002.

== Early life and education ==
Virginia Hart was born in Cleveland, Ohio on September 30, 1928. She was a graduate of Hiram College, where she met her husband, Charles H. Fraser. They married in June 1951. The couple moved to Colorado in 1957, where she earned her master's degree in speech communication at the University of Denver.

== Career ==
In the early 1950s she assisted the American Friends Service Committee with the integration of playgrounds in Washington, D. C. She later worked for the League of Women Voters on issues such as fair housing, civil rights, alternative education, and the environment. She was a frequent participant in protest marches and wrote many letters to the editor to promote her causes.

In 1977 Fraser was inspired to begin advocating for elder rights. She was teaching in a program for "older, non-traditional students" at Loretto Heights College in Denver. To help students fulfill a course requirement to perform a community service project, she contacted a local nursing home and supervised student activities there. A newspaper article about the project garnered more than 100 requests for assistance, and she contacted the Colorado Congress of Seniors. That organization had just received a $20,000 Federal grant to fund a State Long-Term Care Ombudsman, and they offered Fraser the position. She began working in 1980.

Fraser grew the office from a one-woman operation to a staff of 40 salaried and 100 volunteer ombudsmen, soliciting funds from both public and private sectors. The ombudsmen advocated for residents of nursing homes and assisted living facilities across the state. They collected complaints from residents and advocated for them to management, but had no legal power to penalize transgressions. They also prepared an annual report for the Colorado legislature. In the early 2000s, the Colorado State Long-Term Care Ombudsman's office was cited by the United States Department of Health and Human Services as one of the "finest" in the country.

As part of her visits to nursing homes, Fraser encouraged residents to form their own councils to lobby for their rights. She also created a "residents' rights Bingo game" that teaches residents and staff about their rights in a fun way. More than 7,000 copies of the game were purchased by nursing homes across the United States. Fraser later suggested a project to stitch a "residents' rights quilt" at one of the largest nursing homes in the state.

In May 2001 Fraser and Jan Meyers, then co-directors of the State Long-Term Care Ombudsman's office, resigned in protest at an attempt by the Colorado Department of Human Services to curb their independence. While Federal law for state ombudsmen defined the ombudsmen's role as "recommend[ing] changes and facilitat[ing] public comment on Federal, state, and local laws, rules and policies", the state department demanded that the ombudsmen obtain permission from it before speaking with legislators or with the media about problems in long-term care facilities.

== Affiliations and memberships ==
Fraser was a founding member of The Network for Special Elders, the predecessor for the local branch of the Alzheimer's Association.

On the local front, she was a founding member of the Littleton Council on Human Relations and the Metro Denver Fair Housing Center. She was also a member of the Arapahoe Community College Board, the Littleton Planning Commission, and the Littleton Museum Board. She volunteered to record oral histories of numerous long-time Littleton residents for the Museum. She was also a member of the Marias, an informal group of local women activists who met monthly to talk about state, local, and personal issues.

== Awards and honors ==
Fraser received many national awards for her efforts to promote nursing-home rights. In 2000 she was a recipient of the Dr. Martin Luther King Jr. Humanitarian Award. She received the Littleton Independent's Most Valuable Citizen Award, and was inducted into the Colorado Women's Hall of Fame in 2002.

== Personal life ==
She and her husband Charles H. Fraser, a pediatrician, had four daughters. The family enjoyed hiking, horseback riding, and bicycling.

Fraser suffered from Parkinson's disease in her later years. She died of a stroke on November 18, 2011, aged 83.

== Bibliography ==
- Understanding 'Senility': A Layperson's Guide. Prometheus Books. 1987. ISBN 0879753927. (with Susan M. Thornton)
- The New Elders: Innovative programs by, for and about the elderly. Loretto Heights College. 1987. (with Susan M. Thornton)
- Nursing Homes: Getting Good Care There. American Source Books. (with Sarah Greene Burger, Sara Hunt, and Barbara Frank)
