= Katharine Stegner Odum =

Educator at Camp Amache (1905-2005)

- Born: 1905
- Died: 2005 (aged 99–100); Fort Collins, Colorado
- Education: Colorado A&M
- Occupation: Educator

Katharine Stegner Odum (1905 - 2005) was an educator at Amache High School in the Amache Japanese American Internment Camp in Colorado.

== Biography ==
Katharine Stegner Odum was born in 1905. She grew up on homesteads in Saskatchewan, Montana, and Dakota.

She was widowed in 1934.

She completed her Bachelor's and Master's degrees at Colorado A&M. She taught in Del Norte, Colorado and worked as a farm laborer.

Odum was a master teacher and senior advisor at Amache High School. She was a counselor, archivist, mentor, and advocate for the students in her purview. She was remembered as a beloved teacher. The success of many student activities was due to her efforts. She sponsored the senior class and Las Allegrias student organization.

Her students held a reunion in 1993 to honor her, and more than 80 students and families attended.

Odum moved to Fort Collins in 2002. Odum died in 2005.

In 1998, she was honored by the Amache Historical Society's "Distinguished Service Award."

In 2005, Odum was recognized by the Japanese American National Museum at its Annual Award Gala for her teaching.

Odum was inducted into the Colorado Women's Hall of Fame in 2022.
