= Lydia Prado =

Mental health leader in Denver, CO

Lydia M. Prado (b. 1960) is an American mental health leader in Denver, Colorado, advocating for community-led health and supporting underserved members of the community. She is the Executive Director of Lifespan Local. In 2022, she was inducted into the Colorado Women's Hall of Fame.

== Biography ==
Prado grew up on the East Side of Los Angeles, California in 1960.

She earned her doctorate at the University of Denver in 1994.

Prado was the Vice President of Child and Family Services for the Mental Health Center of Denver for 17 years. She launched the Dahlia Campus for Health and Wellbeing in Northeast Park Hill. The Dahlia Campus is an important community center to the Park Hill neighborhood where residents can improve their well-being with healthy food and activities. The campus includes preschool, a dental clinic for children, an urban farm and greenhouse, therapy spaces, a teaching kitchen, and mental health services.

She founded Lifespan Local. This organization is creating another community center in Westwood. In 2021, the organization purchased the Redeemer Lutheran Church in southwest Denver, and they are renovating the space.

In 2018, Prado joined the University of Denver Barton Institute for Philanthropy and Social Enterprise as Director of Community Partnerships.

Prado is on the board of HealthOne, Denver Preschool Program, and Colorado Health Foundation.

== Published works ==
- Prado, Lydia Marie. (1995). Explaining why remarriages are at risk for divorce: exploring the role of communication in remarital relationships. Thesis (Ph.D.)--University of Denver, 1995.
- Prado, L. M., & Markman, H. J. (1999). Unearthing the seeds of marital distress: What we have learned from married and remarried couples. Conflict and cohesion in families: Causes and consequences, 51-85.
- Stanley, Markman, H. J., Prado, L. M., Olmos-Gallo, P. A., Tonelli, L., St. Peters, M., Leber, B. D., Bobulinski, M., Cordova, A., & Whitton, S. W. (2001). Community-Based Premarital Prevention: Clergy and Lay Leaders on the Front Lines. Family Relations, 50(1), 67–76. https://doi.org/10.1111/j.1741-3729.2001.00067.x
- Kline, Stanley, S. M., Markman, H. J., Antonio Olmos-Gallo, P., St. Peters, M., Whitton, S. W., & Prado, L. M. (2004). Timing Is Everything: Pre-Engagement Cohabitation and Increased Risk for Poor Marital Outcomes. Journal of Family Psychology, 18(2), 311–318. https://doi.org/10.1037/0893-3200.18.2.311
- Whitton, Olmos-Gallo, P. A., Stanley, S. M., Prado, L. M., Kline, G. H., Peters, M. S., & Markman, H. J. (2007). Depressive Symptoms in Early Marriage: Predictions from Relationship Confidence and Negative Marital Interaction. Journal of Family Psychology, 21(2), 297–306. https://doi.org/10.1037/0893-3200.21.2.297

== Recognition ==
- 2022, Colorado Women's Hall of Fame
- 2022, 9News Leader of the Year
- 2014, The César Chávez Latino Leadership Hall of Fame Award
