= Dorothy Horrell =

American educator, university administrator and philanthropy administrator

- Born: Dorothy Ann Ortner; February 21, 1951 (age 74); Holyoke, Colorado, US
- Education: B.S., home economics, Colorado State University, 1973; M.Ed., education administration, Colorado State University; PhD, educational administration, Colorado State University
- Occupation(s): Educator, college administrator
- Spouse: Ted Horrell
- Children: 1
- Awards: Colorado Women's Hall of Fame, 2018

Dorothy Ann Ortner Horrell (born February 21, 1951) is an American educator, university administrator, and philanthropy administrator. From 2016 to 2020, she held the post of Chancellor of University of Colorado Denver. She was previously president of both Red Rocks Community College and the Colorado Community College System, and president and CEO of the Bonfils–Stanton Foundation. In 2009, she was appointed by Colorado Governor John Hickenlooper to the Colorado State University Board of Governors, which she also served as chair for a two-year term. Active on the boards of many community organizations, she was inducted into the Colorado Women's Hall of Fame in 2018.

== Early life and education ==
Dorothy Ann Ortner was born on February 21, 1951, in Holyoke, Colorado. The third of eight children, she grew up on her grandfather's farm where her father had also been raised. Starting at age 8, she entered 4-H competitions and eventually competed at the local, state, and national levels.

It was eye-opening, and the first situation in my life where I experienced being very different from everyone else. It instilled in me the idea that none of us has 'the right way' of doing things, and we shouldn't judge those who are different as better, worse or wrong.

–Dorothy Horrell on her experience in Taiwan

After high school graduation in 1969, she earned all of her academic degrees – a Bachelor's of Science in home economics and a Master of Education and PhD in education administration – from Colorado State University.

In 1973, she was one of two students from the state selected to participate in a six-month International Farm Youth Exchange program in Taiwan arranged by 4-H. She left a week after earning her undergraduate degree. The different families who hosted her across Taiwan generally spoke some English. Her visit coincided with a typhoon, and she witnessed the resiliency and coping mechanisms of people in that situation. She later credited the experience for developing her views on leadership and community.

== Career ==
Horrell began her career as a high school teacher in Adams County, Colorado. She then assumed administrative positions with the State Board for Community Colleges and Occupational Education, which governs the Colorado Community College System. She was the first woman director of the Occupational Educational division, and the inaugural vice president of Educational Services.

Horrell served as the first woman president of Red Rocks Community College, from 1989 to 1998. She then became the first woman president of the Colorado Community College System in 1998. However, she unexpectedly resigned from the latter post in 2000, stating that she wished to spend more time with her family. The following year, she accepted the position of president and CEO of the Bonfils–Stanton Foundation, serving in this capacity from 2001 to 2013. During her tenure, she founded the Livingston Fellowship Program and saw the arts and leadership foundation named Colorado's Foundation of the Year in 2007.

In 2009, Governor John Hickenlooper appointed Horrell to the Colorado State University Board of Governors. She was reappointed by the governor in 2012. She served as chairman of the board from 2013 to 2015.

After a brief retirement, Horrell re-entered academia in 2016 to become Chancellor of University of Colorado Denver. She retired from this post in June 2020.

== Affiliations and memberships ==
Horrell has been an active board member of many community organizations. These include: the First National Bank Colorado, the Young Americans Bank, the West Chamber of Commerce Serving Jefferson County, the Jefferson Economic Council, and the Exempla Healthcare System. She was a founding member of the board of Arrupe Jesuit High School (2003-2011) and Clyfford Still Museum (2005-2013), chair of the Board of the Colorado Association of Funders (2009), and co-chair of the Commission on the Reform of Denver's High Schools (2004–05). She has also been a member of the Governor's P-20 Education Council (2007-2011) and the Denver Commission to End Homelessness (2004-2012). In 2017 she joined the board of directors of the Coalition of Urban Serving Universities.

== Awards ==
The Colorado Women's Chamber of Commerce named Horrell one of the Top 25 Most Powerful Women and bestowed on her its ATHENA Award in 2016. She has been inducted into the Colorado 4-H Hall of Fame and, in 2018, into the Colorado Women's Hall of Fame.

== Personal life ==
She and her husband Ted Horrell have one daughter. They reside in Wheat Ridge, Colorado.
