= Linda G. Alvarado =

American construction executive (born 1952)

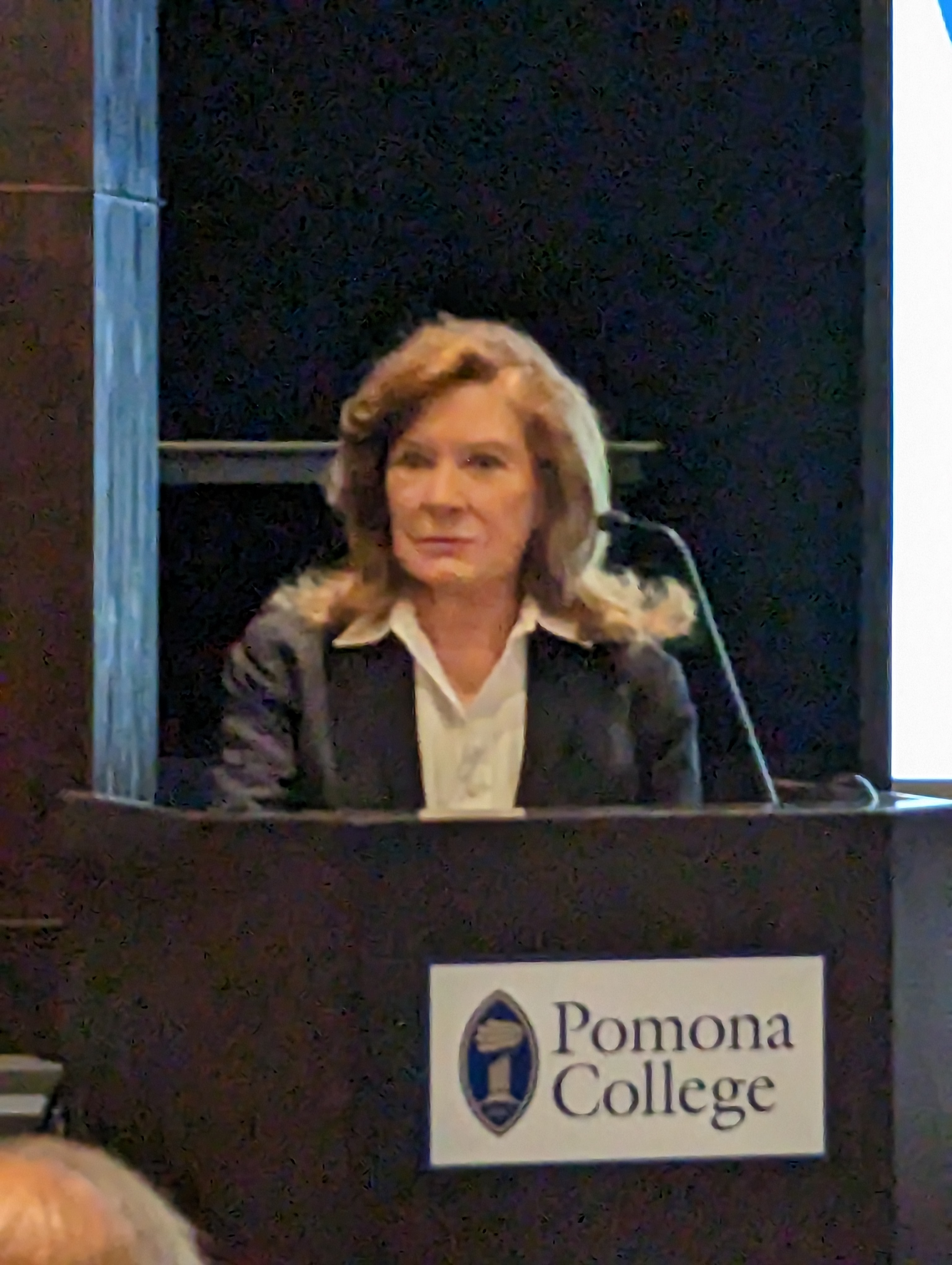
Alvarado at Pomona College in 2023

Linda Alvarado (born 1952) is president and chief executive officer of Alvarado Construction, Inc., a large commercial and industrial general contracting/site management and design/build firm in Denver, Colorado. She is also President of Palo Alto, Inc. (a restaurant company), co-owner of the Colorado Rockies baseball team, and currently a member of the board of 3M.

== Early life ==
Alvarado was born in Albuquerque, New Mexico. She attended Pomona College in Claremont, California where she graduated in 1973 with a bachelor's degree in economics. She was physically challenged at the age of 5, diagnosed with a hernia. She started the Alvarado company in 1976 with the help of her parents, given a loan of $2,500. The company started off by building concrete sidewalks and moved on to larger projects such as schools, stadiums, and aquariums. When she first opened her business, she was active on serving nonprofit boards, supporting minorities and developing stronger connections with the inner city. At the age of 27, she served on her first corporate board.

== Career ==
Linda Alvarado founded her company, Alvarado Construction, in 1976 and continues to oversee the company as CEO. Considered to be one of the fastest-growing construction companies in the United States, Alvarado Construction has offices in four different states. Alvarado Construction is now one of the largest commercial real estate companies in the west, reporting a revenue of $41 million a year. She also holds director positions on 5 Fortune 1000 companies and sits on the boards of 3M, Pitney Bowes, the Pepsi Bottling group and Qwest Communications International. Alvarado co-owns the major league baseball franchise, the Colorado Rockies. She is both the first Hispanic co-owner of a major league team and the first woman ever involved in a formal bid for ownership of a major league baseball team. Alvarado also owns many restaurant franchises in various states.

== Awards and honors ==
- Sara Lee Corp.’s Frontrunner Award (1993),
- Revlon Business Woman of the Year (1996),
- Designated one of the 100 Most Influential Hispanics in America by Hispanic Business Magazine,
- Member of the President's Advisory Commission on Educational Excellence for Hispanic Americans (1995–2001),
- The 1996 U.S. Hispanic Chamber of Commerce Business Woman of the Year distinction, honored by the prestigious Sara Lee Corporation Frontrunner Award,
- The 2001 Horatio Alger Award,
- Inducted into the Colorado Women's Hall of Fame (2002),
- Inducted into the National Women's Hall of Fame (2003),
- Named to the White House Commission for Hispanic Excellence in Education,
- Named Woman of the Year by the Mexican American Foundation,
- The National Women's Economic Alliance Director's Choice Award.
- Nominated "Most Inspiring American Latino" by the American Latino TV network.

== Community involvement ==
Alvarado supports initiatives to educate Latinos and helps to Latino women create business careers. She is a member of the Greater Denver Chamber of Commerce, the National Network of Hispanic Women, and the Hispanic Chamber of Commerce.
