= Lula Lubchenco =

American pediatrician

- Born: 1915; Russian Turkestan
- Died: 2001 (aged 85–86)
- Education: University of Denver; University of Colorado School of Medicine
- Medical career
- Field: Pediatrics
- Institutions: Colorado General Hospital
- Research: Small for gestational age infants

Lula Olga Lubchenco (1915–2001) was an American pediatrician. Her family moved from Russian Turkestan to South Carolina when she was a small child, and Lubchenco's higher education and career were spent almost entirely in Colorado. After completing a pediatric residency in Denver, Lubchenco joined the faculty of the University of Colorado School of Medicine and was the first director of the Premature Infant Center at Colorado General Hospital.

Lubchenco was among the early physicians to suspect a link between oxygen administration and the eye condition that became known as retinopathy of prematurity. Her research into small for gestational age infants led to a chart that plotted birth weight against gestational age; the chart became known informally as the "Lulagram". Lubchenco remained involved with committees at the university until her death.

== Early life ==
Lubchenco was born in Russian Turkestan in 1915. Lubchenco's mother, Portia McKnight Lubchenco, was an American physician and the first female to graduate from North Carolina Medical College. Portia Lubchenco met her husband Alexis, a Russian agronomist, when he came to the United States to learn to grow cotton. Alexis Lubchenco was a professor at the University of Moscow and was friends with politician Alexander Kerensky. Lula Lubchenco was the second of five children, and the family lived in Turkestan until Lubchenco was about two years old. The family made their way to the U.S. via China and the Pacific Ocean, ultimately settling on a farm in South Carolina.

In 1930, when the boll weevil damaged the family's crops, they moved to Northeast Colorado, where Lubchenco graduated from high school. She attended Denver University and completed a medical degree from the University of Colorado School of Medicine in 1939. Lubchenco completed a rotating internship at Colorado General Hospital and began her pediatric training at Strong Memorial Hospital. In 1941, for family reasons, she returned to Denver to complete her pediatric residency and research fellowship at Denver Children's Hospital.

== Career ==
Lubchenco was a private-practice pediatrician and a faculty member at the University of Colorado School of Medicine for a short time before she was asked to head Colorado General Hospital's Premature Infant Center on what was supposed to be an interim basis. Early in her career, she worked with obstetrics chairman E. Stewart Taylor to hold collaborative training in neonatal resuscitation for obstetric and pediatric residents.

By 1950, Lubchenco noted that a high percentage of her former preterm patients were developing blindness from an eye condition known as retrolental fibroplasia (RLF), which was later renamed retinopathy of prematurity (ROP). She conducted a study that compared some of the Premature Infant Center's practices in the 1943–49 period (when RLF was rare) to the strategies that were in use by 1950. Evidence pointed to excessive oxygen administration as an important cause of RLF, and Lubchenco was able to greatly reduce the incidence of RLF in her center by managing the oxygen carefully, though it took several years before physicians at other hospitals were convinced of this connection.

In the early 1960s, Lubchenco began to publish her research on the relationship between birth weight and gestational age in newborns. A chart that allowed clinicians to plot a baby's birth weight against its gestational age became informally known as the "Lulagram". Before Lubchenco began her work, babies with low birth weights were referred to as premature. Her work led to the popularization of the term low birth weight, which underscored the fact that such babies may or may not have been born early. The descriptors small for gestational age, appropriate for gestational age and large for gestational age originated with Lubchenco's work.

In 1973, the Medical College of Pennsylvania named Lubchenco the Medical Woman of the Year.

== Personal life ==
During her medical training, Lubchenco met and became engaged to Denver internist Carl Josephson. They married and had four daughters. The youngest daughter, Gretchen Josephson, was born with Down syndrome.

== Later life ==
Lubchenco retired from clinical practice in 1977, but she remained a member of university committees until her death. The University of Colorado gave Lubchenco an honorary doctorate in 1989.
