= Ruth Stockton =

American politician (1916–1990)

Member of the Colorado Senate
- In office 1964–1984

Member of the Colorado House of Representatives
- In office 1961–1964

Personal details
- Born: June 6, 1916 Ridgefield Park, New Jersey
- Died: October 21, 1990 (aged 74) Lakewood, Colorado
- Party: Republican
- Spouse: Truman Stockton
- Education: Columbia University

Ruth Small Stockton (June 6, 1916 – October 21, 1990) represented Jefferson County for 24 years as a Republican state representative in the Colorado General Assembly. Stockton was the Senate Majority Caucus leader (1967–1968) and the first woman to serve as the state's president pro tempore (1979–1980). She was inducted into the Colorado Women's Hall of Fame in 1985.

She attended Vassar College but dropped out during the depression to work at Macy's, though she returned later to complete classes at Columbia University. Her father, Arthur Small, was worked for the Republican National Committee. While at the 1936 Republican National Convention, she met her future husband, Truman Stockton, who was then the president of the Young Republicans and a Colorado delegate.

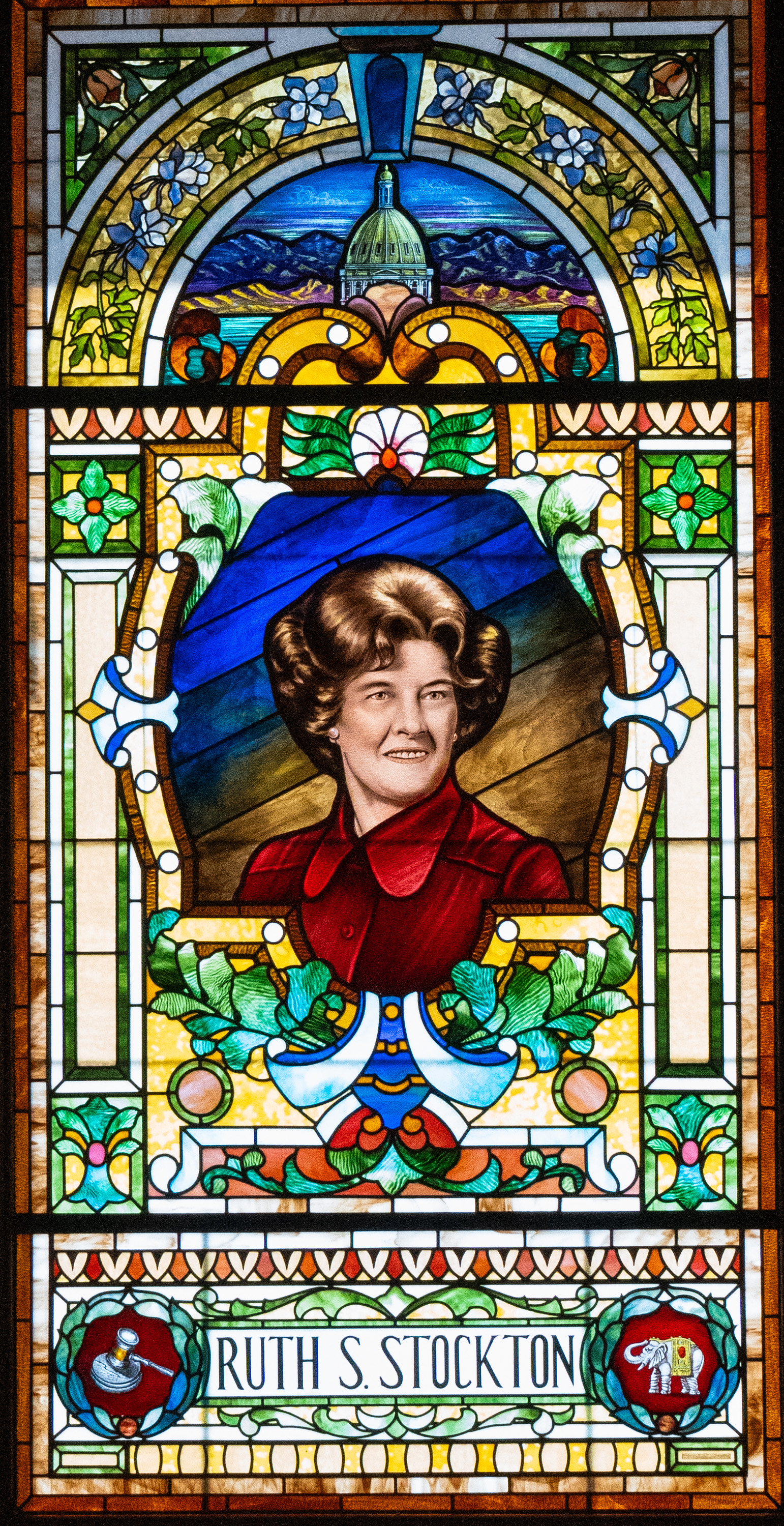
Stained glass mural of Stockton in the Colorado State Capitol.

Stockton waited until her daughter went to college to run for office. She was first elected to the Colorado House of Representatives in 1961 and, after subsequent reelections to the house, won a seat in the Colorado Senate, where she represented Lakewood from 1965 until 1984. Stockton was the Senate Majority Caucus leader (1967–1968) and the first woman to serve as the state's president pro tempore (1979–1980). During over two decades in office, she chaired the Appropriations, Senate Services, and Health, Environment, Welfare, and Institutions committees, in addition to chair the Joint Budget Committee, which she was the first woman to do. Stockton was a moderate Republican and supported the Equal Rights Amendment and women's abortion rights.

In 1986, a stained glass mural of Stockton was installed in the Senate chamber of the Colorado State Capitol.
