= Patricia Barela Rivera =

Latina businesswoman and workplace equity advocate

- Born: 1947 (age 78–79); Corrales, New Mexico
- Education: University of New Mexico
- Occupation: Business Consultant
- Organizations: Progressive Women of Colorado; Colorado Women Circles of Influence; Adelante Mujer Hispana; Les Mujeres of League of United Latin American (LULAC); Latina Safehouse; Las Mujeres Valientes; Latinos Leadership Institute
- Known for: First Latina District Director for the U.S. Small Business Administration

Patricia Barela Rivera (born 1947) is a businesswoman and advocate for workplace diversity and gender equality. In 2023, she was inducted into the Colorado Women's Hall of Fame. She is currently the president and owner of consulting firm PBR Solutions, and serves on the University of Northern Colorado Board of Trustees through 2024.

== Biography ==
Patricia Barela Rivera was born in Corrales, New Mexico. Her last name is a combination of her parents' names: Barela is her father's name and Rivera is her mother's maiden name. She comes from a family of sixth-generation New Mexicans.

She attended the University of New Mexico and earned a bachelor's degree in business administration. In 1970, she began her career at the University of Albuquerque. She was recruited as the Regional Civil Rights/EEO Specialist for the U.S. Forest Service, then regional management trainer for the Office of Personnel Management in the Rocky Mountain region.

In 1980, she was an organizer for the Adelante Mujer Hispana Conference, which was the first conference to support training, education, and employment for Hispanic women.

Barela Rivera worked with the Colorado governor's office from 1994 to 1997. She was appointed as Deputy Director of the Department of Local Affairs by Governor Roy Romer. She then went on to be the Director of Citizen Advocacy and Outreach in the governor's office. She led the development of the Colorado Diversity Plan for all 27 agencies.

She was the first Latina to serve as a District Director for the U.S. Small Business Administration. While in this role, her office supported 17,500 small business loans worth $2 billion. She retired in 2008 after 11 years of service. Under her watch, her office was consistently ranked as one of the top SBA district offices in the nation. Her office received the "Administrator's Award for Excellence for the Greatest Increase in Emerging Market."

She co-founded the following organizations: Progressive Women of Colorado, Colorado Women Circles of Influence, Adelante Mujer Hispana, Les Mujeres of League of United Latin American (LULAC), Latina Safehouse, Las Mujeres Valientes, and Latinos Leadership Institute.

== Recognition ==
- 2025, Denver Business Journal, Outstanding Women in Business Lifetime Achievement Award
- 2023, Colorado Women's Hall of Fame
- 2009, Martin Luther King, Jr. Business Award
- 2007, Colorado Women's Chamber of Commerce Athena Award
- 1997, Girl Scout Women of Distinction Denver
