= Portia Mansfield =

American dance educator and choreographer

Portia Mansfield (November 19, 1887 – January 29, 1979) was an American dance educator and choreographer. She was inducted into the Colorado Women's Hall of Fame in 2004.

The daughter of Edward R. Swett, a hotel manager, and Myra Mansfield, she was born Portia Mansfield Swett in Chicago. Her family moved to Florida in 1899 and she was educated in Winter Park there and then at Miss Morgan's School for Girls in New York City from 1903 to 1906 following another move. In 1906, she began studies in philosophy and psychology at Smith College but also took courses in physical education.

After graduating from Smith College, Mansfield undertook further studies in dance in Europe and the United States and then operated a dance school in Omaha, Nebraska. In 1913, with Charlotte Perry, she founded the Perry-Mansfield Performing Arts School & Camp in Steamboat Springs, Colorado. It later became the oldest continuous dance school and camp in the United States and, in 1994, was added to the National Register of Historic Places. Over the years, members of the faculty included Doris Humphrey, Agnes de Mille, José Limón and Louis Horst. Alumni included actors Lee Remick, Dustin Hoffman and Julie Harris.

In 1921, Mansfield established a dance company, the Portia Mansfield Dancers, later known as the Perry-Mansfield Dancers. She provided the choreography for the company.

In 1979, a documentary film A divine madness was created on the lives of Manfield and Perry.
