= Perry-Mansfield Performing Arts School & Camp =

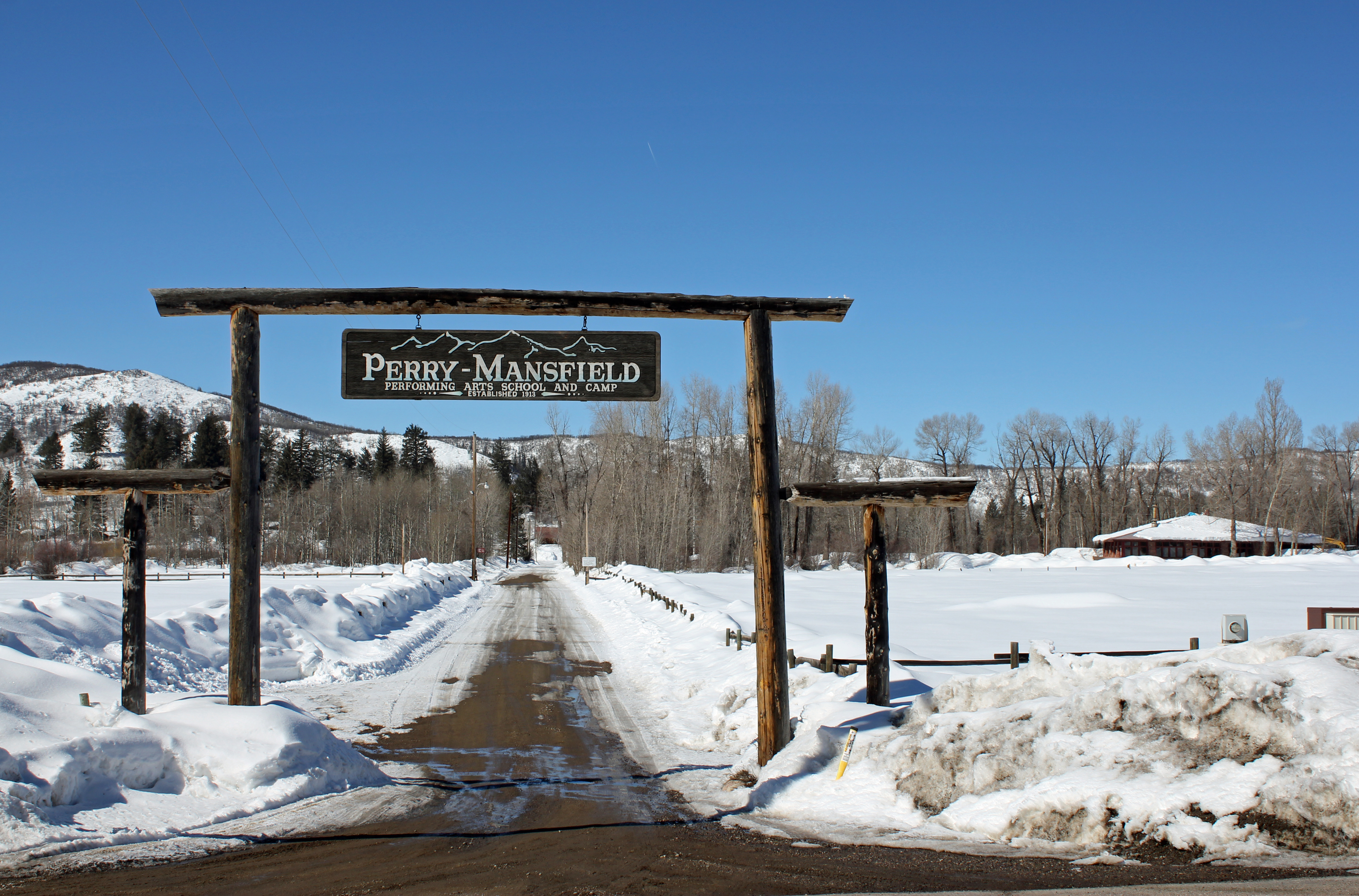
The school's entrance.

The Perry-Mansfield Performing Arts School & Camp is a dance, theater and equestrian camp located in Steamboat Springs, Colorado. Founded in 1913 by Charlotte Perry and Portia Mansfield, it is the oldest continuously operating dance and theater school in America. In 1995 the site was included on the National Register of Historic Places and in 2004 Mansfield and Perry were inducted into the Colorado Women's Hall of Fame.

== Situation ==
The school is located on 76 acres in Strawberry Park, just outside the town of Steamboat Springs and serves 200 students each summer in programs that include an arts discovery program for pre-teens, an equestrian day camp, an arts training junior camp, a young artist intensive and a preprofessional intensive program in dance and theater.

== History ==
In 1913, Charlotte Perry and Portia Mansfield, both alumna of Smith College founded their first camp near Lake Eldora in Colorado, and after a year moved the camp to Steamboat Springs to a 15 acre property bought for $200. Early on, Perry and Mansfield lived in a small cabin on the property while local carpenters constructed a dining hall and dance studio with a small theater on the property. Other residents stayed in tents on the campus. To subsidize the newly founded camp, Portia Mansfield, a student of the Pavley-Oukrainsky School, also taught dance in Chicago in Hyde Park. Mansfield also studied the Delsarte technique as well as the Gilbert method.

Perry-Mansfield became an important part of the physical education movement in the early 20th century, as it was one of the few places where women could study dance and return to their own programs prepared to teach physical education.

Notable alumni and faculty of the school include Julie Harris, Doris Humphrey, Charles Weidman, José Limón, Hanya Holm, Valerie Bettis, Merce Cunningham, Louis Horst, Agnes de Mille, Martha Clarke, Jessica Biel, Dustin Hoffman, and Ruthana Boris.

== Current Program ==
Perry-Mansfield currently offers courses from grade 5, grouped by age, from a junior camp to a pre-professional intensive course for grades 11 up to college age.

Prominent dance faculty at Perry-Mansfield in recent years include Robert Battle, Antonio Brown, Desiree Burch, and Richard Bennett, among others.

== Other Activities ==
In recent years, in addition to dance and theater camp programs and horseback riding programs, Perry-Mansfield has sponsored a festival of New Works, curated by Andrew Leynse, director of the off-Broadway Primary Stages in New York. In the first 10 days, audience members are permitted to watch rehearsals in progress and see plays being workshopped from readings to performance.
