= Julie Harris =

American actress (1925–2013)

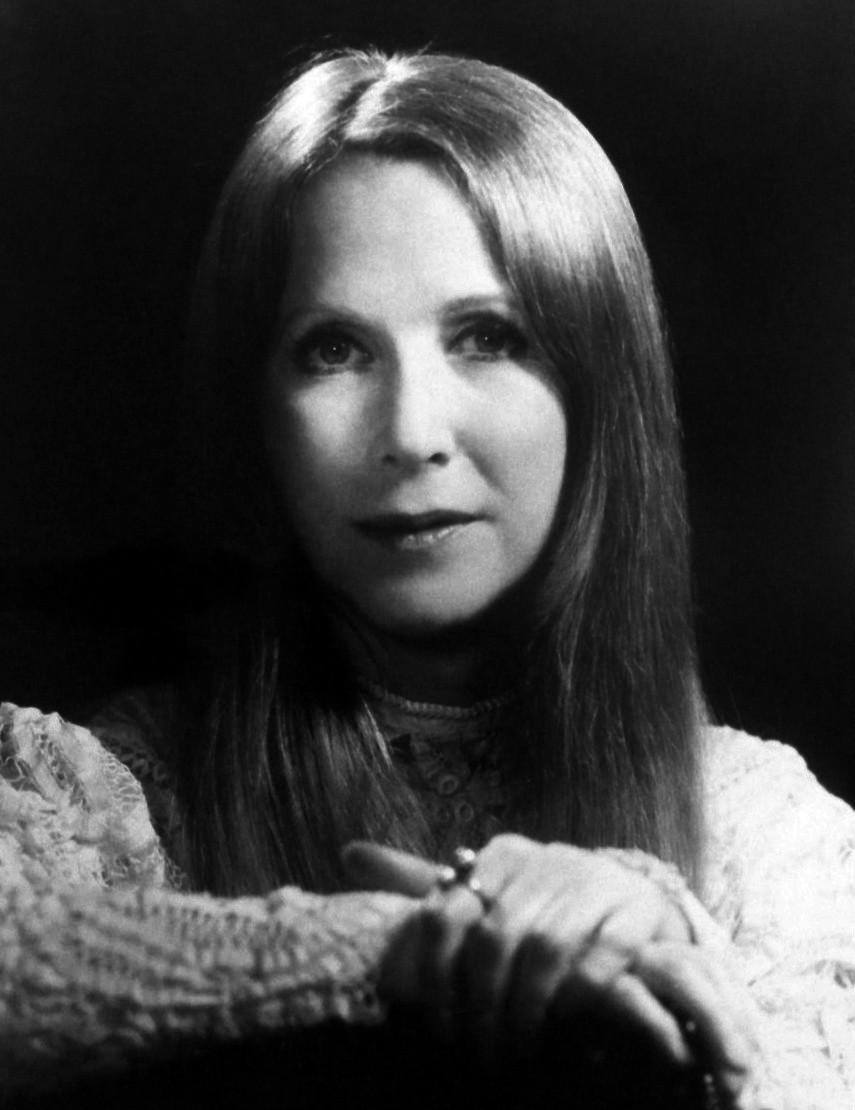
- Publicity photo of Julie Harris (1973)
- Born: Julia Ann Harris; December 2, 1925; Grosse Pointe, Michigan, U.S.
- Died: August 24, 2013 (aged 87); West Chatham, Massachusetts, U.S.
- Education: Yale University
- Occupation: Actress
- Years active: 1945–2009
- Spouses: Jay Julian (m. 1946; div. 1954) Manning Gurian (m. 1954; div. 1967) Walter Carroll (m. 1977; div. 1982)
- Children: 1

Julia Ann Harris (December 2, 1925 – August 24, 2013) was an American actress. Widely regarded as one of the greatest actresses of the American theater, she earned numerous accolades including a record five Tony Awards for Best Lead Actress in a Play, as well as three Primetime Emmy Awards and a Grammy Award, in addition to nominations for an Academy Award and a BAFTA Award. She was inducted into the American Theater Hall of Fame in 1979, received the National Medal of Arts in 1994, the Special Lifetime Achievement Tony Award in 2002, and the Kennedy Center Honor in 2005.

After making her Broadway debut in 1945 Harris went on to win five Tony Awards for Best Actress in a Play for her roles in I Am a Camera (1952), The Lark (1956), Forty Carats (1969), The Last of Mrs. Lincoln (1973), and The Belle of Amherst (1977). Her other Tony-nominated roles were in Marathon '33 (1964), Skyscraper (1966), The au Pair Man (1974), Lucifer's Child (1991), and The Gin Game (1997).

She starred in the 1950 play The Member of the Wedding, a role she reprised in the 1952 film of the same name, for which she was nominated for the Academy Award for Best Actress. Her other notable film roles include East of Eden (1955), I Am a Camera (1955), The Haunting (1963), and Reflections in a Golden Eye (1967). Harris received three Primetime Emmy Awards, for her roles in Little Moon of Alban (1958), Victoria Regina (1962), and Not for Ourselves Alone (1999). She won the Grammy Award for Best Spoken Word Album for The Belle of Amherst (1978).

== Life and career ==
=== Early years and education ===
Julia Ann Harris was born on December 2, 1925, in Grosse Pointe Park, Michigan, the daughter of Elsie L. (née Smith), a nurse, and William Pickett Harris, an investment banker and authority on zoology. She had an older brother, William, and a younger brother, Richard. She graduated from Grosse Pointe Country Day School, which later merged with two others to form the University Liggett School. In New York City, she attended The Hewitt School. As a teenager, she also trained at the Perry-Mansfield Performing Arts School & Camp in Colorado with Charlotte Perry, a mentor who encouraged Harris to apply to the Yale School of Drama, which she soon attended for a year. In 2007, Yale bestowed an honorary Doctor of Fine Arts degree upon Harris. As a founding member of Lee Strasberg's Actors Studio, Harris studied method acting, which emphasized psychology and emotions, and although it was strongly associated with male actors, she was able to successfully employ its techniques.

=== 1945–1959: Early roles ===
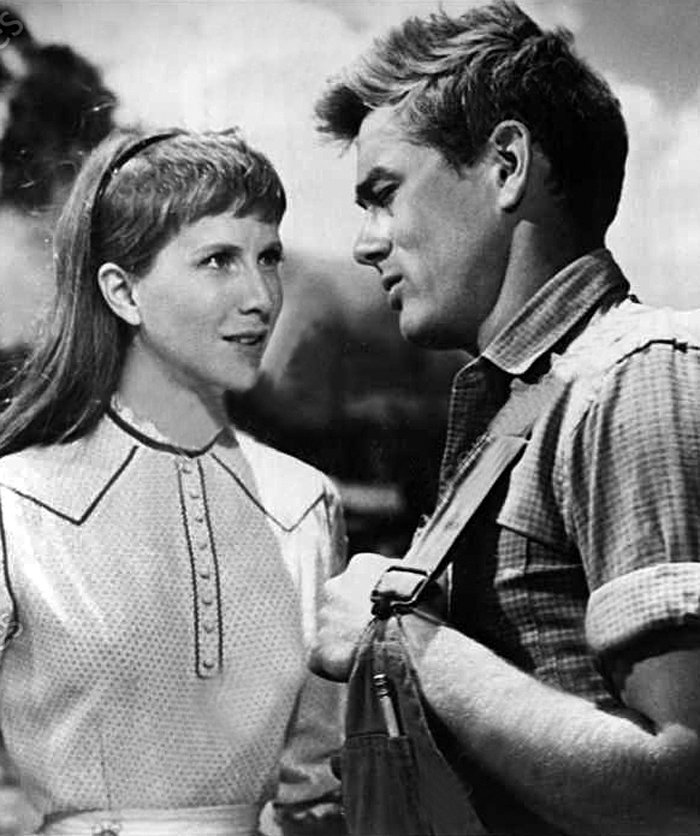
Harris and James Dean in East of Eden (1955)

In 1952, Harris won her first Best Actress Tony Award for originating the role of insouciant Sally Bowles in I Am a Camera, the stage version of Christopher Isherwood's Goodbye to Berlin (later adapted as the Broadway musical Cabaret (1966) and as the 1972 film, with Liza Minnelli as Sally). Harris repeated her stage role in the film version of I Am a Camera (1955). Harris's screen debut was in 1952, repeating her Broadway success as the lonely teenaged girl Frankie in Carson McCullers's The Member of the Wedding, for which she was nominated for the Academy Award for Best Actress. Director Elia Kazan cast her in East of Eden (1955) opposite James Dean in his first major screen role.

Harris was nominated for 11 Primetime Emmy Awards for her television work, winning three. She starred as Nora Helmer opposite Christopher Plummer in A Doll's House (1959), a 90-minute television adaptation of Henrik Ibsen's play. She made more appearances in leading roles on the Hallmark Hall of Fame than any other actress, also appearing in two different adaptations of the play Little Moon of Alban, her performance in the 1958 TV movie of the same name earning her the Primetime Emmy Award for Outstanding Lead Actress in a Limited Series or Movie.

=== 1960–1989: Breakthrough and acclaim ===
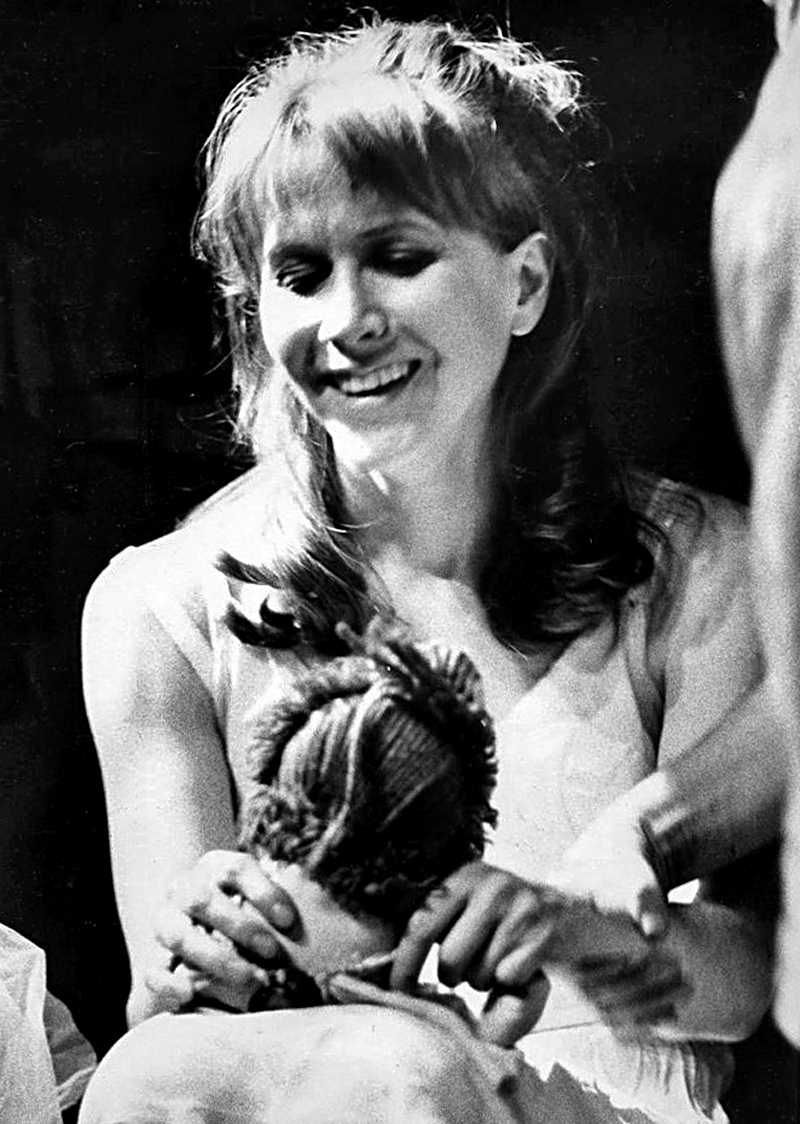
In an Actors Studio play, Marathon '33 (1963)

She played the ethereal Eleanor Lance in The Haunting (1963), director Robert Wise's screen adaptation of a novel by Shirley Jackson. Another cast member recalled Harris refusing to socialize with the other actors while not on set, later explaining that she had done so as a method of emphasizing the alienation from the other characters experienced by her character in the film. Other notable films Harris appeared in during the 1960s include Requiem for a Heavyweight (1962), Harper (with Paul Newman) (1966), and Reflections in a Golden Eye (1967). Another noteworthy film appearance was the World War II drama The Hiding Place (1975).

Her second Emmy win came for her role as Queen Victoria in the 1961 Hallmark Hall of Fame production of Laurence Housman's Victoria Regina. She received further Emmy nominations for a range of roles including Anastasia (1967), The Last of Mrs. Lincoln (1976)—where she reprised her Tony-winning role as Mary Todd Lincoln from the 1973 play of the same name—and The Woman He Loved (1988). She won her third Emmy award in 2000 for Outstanding Voice-Over Performance for her voice role of Susan B. Anthony in Not for Ourselves Alone.

Of particular note is her Tony-winning performance in The Belle of Amherst, a one-woman play (written by William Luce and directed by Charles Nelson Reilly) based on the life and poetry of Emily Dickinson. She received a Grammy Award for Best Spoken Word Recording for the audio recording of the play. She first performed the play in 1976 and subsequently appeared in other solo shows, including Luce's Brontë. Harris holds the Tonys record as the person with most wins (5) and nominations (9) in the Lead Actress in a Play category. Other Broadway credits include The Playboy of the Western World, Macbeth, The Member of the Wedding, A Shot in the Dark, Skyscraper, And Miss Reardon Drinks a Little, Forty Carats, The Glass Menagerie, A Doll's House, The Gin Game, and a North American tour in 1992 of Lettice and Lovage in the lead part originated by Maggie Smith on Broadway.

In 1980, Harris guest starred in the series Knots Landing as country singer Lilimae Clements, the eccentric and protective mother of Valene Ewing (Joan Van Ark); she returned to the series as a regular character from 1981 to 1987. The role earned Harris a nomination for the Primetime Emmy Award for Outstanding Supporting Actress in a Drama Series, and two Soap Opera Digest Award nominations. In 1983, Harris became a company member of The Mirror Theater Ltd's Mirror Repertory Company. She became a mentor to the company, having urged Founding Artistic Director Sabra Jones to create the company from 1976 forward, when Jones married John Strasberg. Harris and Jones met at a performance of The Belle of Amherst, a revival of which The Mirror Theater Ltd recently performed in their summer home in Vermont.

=== 1990–2009: Established actress ===
Harris made two recordings of narrations of E. B. White's children's book Stuart Little for the Pathways of Sound record label: the last six chapters for a single LP record in 1965, and the entire book for a two-record set in 1979. She also recorded narrations of many children's books for Caedmon Records. Harris also did extensive voiceover work for documentary maker Ken Burns: the voices of Emily Warren Roebling in Brooklyn Bridge (1981), Ann Lee in The Shakers: Hands to Work, Hearts to God (1984), and most notably Southern diarist Mary Boykin Chesnut for Burns' 1990 series The Civil War.

In the summer of 2008, she appeared on stage again in Chatham, Massachusetts, as "Nanny" in a Monomoy Theater production of The Effect of Gamma Rays on Man-in-the-Moon Marigolds. Harris continued to work until 2009, well into her eighties, narrating five historical documentaries by Christopher Seufert and Mooncusser Films, as well as being active as a director on the board of the independent Wellfleet Harbor Actors Theater (WHAT). In 2007, when the company built a new, additional theater, also in Wellfleet, Massachusetts, Ms Harris declined to have the building named for her. However, she consented to their naming "a piece of it after me"; WHAT named their stage the "Julie Harris Stage".

=== Personal life and death ===
Harris lived in West Chatham, Cape Cod, for many years until her death. Three times divorced, she had one son, Peter Alston Gurian. A breast cancer survivor, she suffered a severe fall requiring surgery in 1999, a stroke in 2001, and a second stroke in 2010.

Harris died on August 24, 2013, of congestive heart failure at her home in West Chatham, Massachusetts. Harris was cremated after her death.

== Acting credits ==
=== Film ===
Year	Title	Role	Notes
1952	The Member of the Wedding	Frances "Frankie" Addams	Film debut
1955	East of Eden	Abra Bacon	
1955	I Am a Camera	Sally Bowles	
1957	The Truth About Women	Helen Cooper	
1958	Sally's Irish Rogue	Sally Hamil	
1962	Requiem for a Heavyweight	Grace Miller	
1963	The Haunting	Eleanor "Nell" Lance	
1964	Hamlet	Ophelia	
1966	Harper	Betty Fraley	
1966	You're a Big Boy Now	Miss Nora Thing	
1967	Reflections in a Golden Eye	Alison Langdon	
1968	The Split	Gladys	
1968	Journey to Midnight	Leona Gillings	"The Indian Spirit Guide"
1970	The People Next Door	Gerrie Mason	
1975	The Hiding Place	Betsie Ten Boom	
1976	Voyage of the Damned	Alice Fienchild	
1979	The Bell Jar	Mrs. Greenwood	
1983	Brontë	Charlotte Brontë	
1985	Crimewave		Uncredited
1986	Nutcracker: The Motion Picture	Clara (voice)	
1988	Gorillas in the Mist	Roz Carr	
1992	Housesitter	Edna Davis	
1993	The Dark Half	Reggie Delesseps	
1996	Carried Away	Joseph's Mother	
1997	Bad Manners	Professor Harper	
1998	Passage to Paradise	Martha McGraw	
1998	The First of May	Carlotta	
2006	The Way Back Home	Jo McMillen	
2008	The Golden Boys	Melodeon Player	
2009	The Lightkeepers	Mrs. Deacon	

=== Television ===
Year	Title	Role	Notes
1948–1949	Actors Studio		4 episodes
1951	Starlight Theatre	Bernice	episode: "Bernice Bobs Her Hair"
1951–1953	Goodyear Television Playhouse		2 episodes
1955	The United States Steel Hour	Shevawn	episode: "A Wind from the South"
1956	The Good Fairy	Lu	TV movie
1957	The Lark	Joan of Arc	TV movie
1958	Little Moon of Alban	Bridgid Mary Mangan	TV movie
1958	Johnny Belinda	Belinda	TV movie
1959	A Doll's House	Nora Helmer	TV movie
1960	NBC Sunday Showcase	Francesca	episode: "Turn the Key Deftly"
1960–1961	DuPont Show of the Month	Mattie Silver/Julia	2 episodes
1961	Play of the Week		episode: "He Who Gets Slapped"
1961	The Heiress	Catherine Sloper	TV movie
1961	The Power and the Glory	Maria (Priest's Mistress)	TV movie
1961	Victoria Regina	Queen Victoria	TV movie
1963	Pygmalion	Eliza Doolittle	TV movie
1964	Little Moon of Alban	Brigid Mary Mangan	TV movie
1964	Kraft Suspense Theatre	Lucy Bram	episode: "The Roborioz Ring"
1965	The Holy Terror	Florence Nightingale	TV movie
1965	Rawhide	Emma Teall	episode: "The Calf Women"
1965	Laredo	Annamay	episode: "Rendezvous at Arillo"
1966	Bob Hope Presents the Chrysler Theatre	Isobel Cain/Vicky Cain	episode: "Nightmare"
1967	Anastasia	Anastasia	TV movie
1967–1968	Tarzan	Charity Jones	4 episodes
1968	Garrison's Gorillas	Therese Donet	episode: "Run from Death"
1968	Run for Your Life	Lucrece Lawrence	episode: "The Rape of Lucrece"
1968	Daniel Boone	Faith	episode: "Faith's Way"
1968	Bonanza	Sarah Carter	episode: "A Dream to Dream"
1968	Journey to the Unknown	Leona Gillings	episode: "The Indian Spirit Guide"
1968	The Big Valley	Jennie Hall	episode: "A Stranger Everywhere"
1969–1970	The Name of the Game	Verna Ward/Ruth 'Doc' Harmon	2 episodes
1970	House on Greenapple Road	Leona Miller	TV movie
1970	How Awful About Allan	Katherine	ABC Movie of the Week
1971	The Virginian	Jenny	episode: "Wolf Track"
1972	Home for the Holidays	Elizabeth Hall Morgan	ABC Movie of the Week
1973	Thicker than Water	Nellie Paine	9 episodes
1973	Medical Center	Helen	episode: "The Guilty"
1973	Columbo	Karen Fielding	episode: "Any Old Port in a Storm"
1973	Hawkins	Janet Hubbard	episode: "Die, Darling, Die"
1973	The Evil Touch	Aunt Carrie/Jenny	2 episodes
1974	The Greatest Gift	Elizabeth Holvak	TV movie
1975	Long Way Home	Elizabeth Holvak	TV movie
1975	The Family Holvak	Elizabeth Holvak	10 episodes
1975	Match Game	Herself (panelist)	6 total episodes (1 for syndication)
1976	The Last of Mrs. Lincoln	Mary Todd Lincoln	TV movie
1976	The Belle of Amherst	Emily Dickinson	TV movie
1978	Stubby Pringle's Christmas	Georgia Henderson	TV movie
1979	Backstairs at the White House	Mrs. Helen 'Nellie' Taft	miniseries
1979	Tales of the Unexpected	Mrs. Bixby/Mrs. Foster	2 episodes
1979	The Gift	Anne Devlin	TV movie
1980–1987	Knots Landing	Lilimae Clements	165 episodes
1986	Annihilator	Girl	TV movie
1986	Family Ties	Margaret	episode: "The Freshman and the Senior"
1987	The Love Boat	Irene Culver	episode: "Who Killed Maxwell Thorn?"
1988	The Woman He Loved	Alice	TV movie
1988	Too Good to Be True	Margaret Berent	TV movie
1988	The Christmas Wife	Iris	TV movie
1989	Single Women Married Men	Lucille Frankyl	TV movie
1990	The Civil War	Mary Chestnut (voice)	miniseries; 9 episodes
1993	Vanished Without a Trace	Odessa Ray	TV movie
1993	When Love Kills: The Seduction of John Hearn	Alice Hearn	TV movie
1994	Scarlett	Eleanor Butler	miniseries
1994	One Christmas	Sook	TV movie
1995	Secrets	Caroline Phelan	TV movie
1995	Lucifer's Child	Isak Dinesen	TV movie
1996	Little Surprises	Ethel	TV short
1996	The Christmas Tree	Sister Anthony	TV movie
1997	Ellen Foster	Leonora Nelson	TV movie
1998	The Outer Limits	Hera	episode: "Lithia"
1999	Love Is Strange	Sylvia McClain	TV movie
1999	Not for Ourselves Alone	Susan B. Anthony (voice)	TV documentary

=== Theater ===
Year	Title	Role	Venue
1945	It's a Gift	Atlanta	
1946	Henry IV, Part 2		
1946	Oedipus Rex		
1946–1947	The Playboy of the Western World	Nelly	
1947	Alice in Wonderland	White Rabbit	alternate
1948	Macbeth	Witch	
1948	Sundown Beach	Ida Mae	
1948–1949	The Young and Fair	Nancy Gear	
1949	Magnolia Alley	Angel Tuttle	
1949	Montserrat	Felisa	
1950–1951	The Member of the Wedding	Frankie Addams	
1951–1952	I Am a Camera	Sally Bowles	
1954	Mademoiselle Colombe	Colombe	
1955–1956	The Lark	Joan	
1959–1960	The Warm Peninsula	Ruth Arnold	
1960	King John	Blanch of Spain	
1960	Romeo and Juliet	Juliet	
1960	Little Moon of Alban	Bridgid Mary Mangan	
1961–1962	A Shot in the Dark	Josefa Lantenay	
1963–1964	Marathon '33	June	
1964	Hamlet	Ophelia	
1964–1965	Ready When You Are, C.B.!	Annie	
1965–1966	Skyscraper	Georgina	
1968–1970	Forty Carats	Ann Stanley	
1971	And Miss Reardon Drinks a Little	Anna Reardon	
1972	Voices	Claire	
1972–1973	The Last of Mrs. Lincoln	Mary Todd Lincoln	
1973–1974	The au Pair Man	Mrs. Rogers	
1974–1975	In Praise of Love	Lydia Cruttwell	
1976	The Belle of Amherst	Emily Dickinson	
1979	On Golden Pond	Ethel Thayer	
1979	Break a Leg	Gertie Kessel	
1980–1981	Mixed Couples	Clarice	
1983	Under The Ilex	Dora de Houghton Carrington Partridge	
1988	Bronte	Charlotte Brontë	
1989–1990	Love Letters	Melissa Gardiner	
1990	Driving Miss Daisy	Daisy Werthan	
1991	Lucifer's Child	Isak Dinesen	
1992	Dear Liar	Mrs. Patrick Campbell	
1993	The Fiery Furnace	Eunice	
1994	Exile in Jerusalem	Elsa	
1994–1995	The Glass Menagerie	Amanda Wingfield	
1996	Sonya	Sonya Tolstoy	
1997	The Road to Mecca	Miss Helen	
1997	The Gin Game	Fonsia Dorsey	
1998	Scent of the Roses	Annalise Morant	
2000	All My Sons	Kate Keller	
2001	Fossils		

=== Sound recordings ===
Harris played Laura in a 1964 Caedmon Records production of The Glass Menagerie, with Montgomery Clift as Tom and Jessica Tandy in Harris's later role of Amanda. Harris can also be heard reading poetry on poetry albums she recorded for Caedmon and on the original Broadway cast recording of Skyscaper.

== Legacy and honors ==
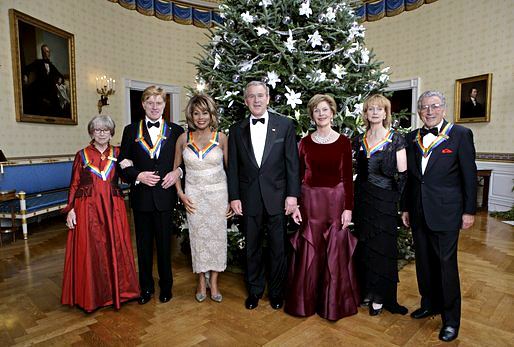
President George W. Bush and Laura Bush pose with the Kennedy Center honorees (L to R): Julie Harris, Robert Redford, Tina Turner, Suzanne Farrell, and Tony Bennett in 2005

Harris is often recognized as one of the greatest and most decorated actresses in the history of the American theater. (Note: Attributed to multiple sources.) Ben Brantley, theater critic for The New York Times, considered her "the actress who towered most luminously ... rather like a Statue of Liberty for Broadway." Alec Baldwin, who played Harris's son on Knots Landing, praised her in a tribute in the Huffington Post: "Her voice was like rainfall. Her eyes connected directly to and channeled the depths of her powerful and tender heart. Her talent, a gift from God."

Harris ties with Angela Lansbury with five Tony Award wins (Audra McDonald has since passed them both, with six wins). However, she holds the record (alongside Chita Rivera) for the most individual Tony Award nominations, with 10 (Audra McDonald has also since received her 10th nomination). In 1966, Harris won the Sarah Siddons Award for her work in Chicago theatre.

On December 5, 2005, Harris was named a Kennedy Center Honoree. At a White House ceremony, President George W. Bush remarked: "It's hard to imagine the American stage without the face, the voice, and the limitless talent of Julie Harris. She has found happiness in her life's work, and we thank her for sharing that happiness with the whole world."

On August 28, 2013, Broadway theaters dimmed their lights for one minute in honor of Harris. On December 3, 2013, Joan Van Ark announced at a Broadway memorial service the creation of the Julie Harris Scholarship, which provides annual support to an actor studying at the Yale School of Drama. Alec Baldwin made the first contribution. In 2021, Yale Drama became tuition-free and was rebranded the David Geffen School of Drama at Yale University.

=== Awards and nominations ===
Year	Category	Nominated work	Result	Ref.
Academy Awards
1952	Best Actress	The Member of the Wedding	Nominated	
BAFTA Awards
1955	Best Foreign Actress	I Am a Camera	Nominated	
Emmy Awards
1956	Outstanding Lead Actress in a Limited Series or Movie	The United States Steel Hour	Nominated	
1959	Outstanding Lead Actress in a Limited Series or Movie	Little Moon of Alban	Won	
1960	Outstanding Lead Actress in a Limited Series or Movie	DuPont Show of the Month	Nominated	
1962	Outstanding Lead Actress in a Limited Series or Movie	Victoria Regina	Won	
1965	Outstanding Individual Achievement	The Holy Terror	Nominated	
1967	Outstanding Lead Actress in a Limited Series or Movie	Anastasia	Nominated	
1977	Outstanding Lead Actress in a Limited Series or Movie	The Last of Mrs. Lincoln	Nominated	
1982	Outstanding Supporting Actress in a Drama Series	Knots Landing	Nominated	
1988	Outstanding Supporting Actress in a Limited Series or Movie	The Woman He Loved	Nominated	
1998	Outstanding Supporting Actress in a Limited Series or Movie	Ellen Foster	Nominated	
1999	Outstanding Voice-Over Performance	Not for Ourselves Alone	Won	
Grammy Awards
1968	Best Children's Music Album	Magic Fishbone/Happy Prince/Potted Princess	Nominated	
1972	Best Children's Music Album	The Story of Sheherazade	Nominated	
1978	Best Spoken Word Recording	The Belle of Amherst	Won	
Tony Awards
1952	Best Actress in a Play	I Am a Camera	Won	
1956	Best Actress in a Play	The Lark	Won	
1964	Best Actress in a Play	Marathon '33	Nominated	
1966	Best Actress in a Musical	Skyscraper	Nominated	
1969	Best Actress in a Play	Forty Carats	Won	
1973	Best Actress in a Play	The Last of Mrs. Lincoln	Won	
1974	Best Actress in a Play	The au Pair Man	Nominated	
1977	Best Actress in a Play	The Belle of Amherst	Won	
1991	Best Actress in a Play	Lucifer's Child	Nominated	
1997	Best Actress in a Play	The Gin Game	Nominated	

== See also ==
- List of actors with Academy Award nominations
- List of American film actresses
- List of American television actresses
- List of people with breast cancer
- List of Primetime Emmy Award winners
- List of Tony Award records
