= Charlotte Perry =

American educator (1889–1983)

Charlotte Louise Perry
- Born: 21 December 1889; Denver, Colorado, U.S.
- Died: 28 October 1983
- Education: Smith College (BA, English literature and botany)
- Occupations: Educator, performing arts school founder
- Known for: Co-founder of Perry-Mansfield Performing Arts School & Camp
- Awards: Inducted into Colorado Women's Hall of Fame (2004)

Charlotte Louise Perry (December 21, 1889 – October 28, 1983) was an American educator. She was inducted into the Colorado Women's Hall of Fame in 2004.

The daughter of Samuel Perry and Louise Manson, she was born in Denver, Colorado. From a young age, she developed a love for the outdoors and also for the theater. She received a BA in English literature and botany from Smith College in 1911. With Portia Mansfield, she established the Perry-Mansfield Performing Arts School & Camp in Steamboat Springs, Colorado in 1913. Besides the arts: dance, drama, art and music, the camp incorporated outdoor activities including tennis, swimming, horseback riding and overnight camping. It later became the oldest continuous dance school and camp in the United States. In 1994, she school was added to the National Register of Historic Places. Alumni included actors Lee Remick, Dustin Hoffman and Julie Harris.

When Portia Mansfield established the Portia Mansfield Dancers, later the Perry-Mansfield Dancers, Perry served as general designer and technical director and later was one of the leading dancers for the company.

In 1979, a documentary film A divine madness was created on the lives of Manfield and Perry.
