= Walter Cronkite =

American broadcast journalist (1916–2009)

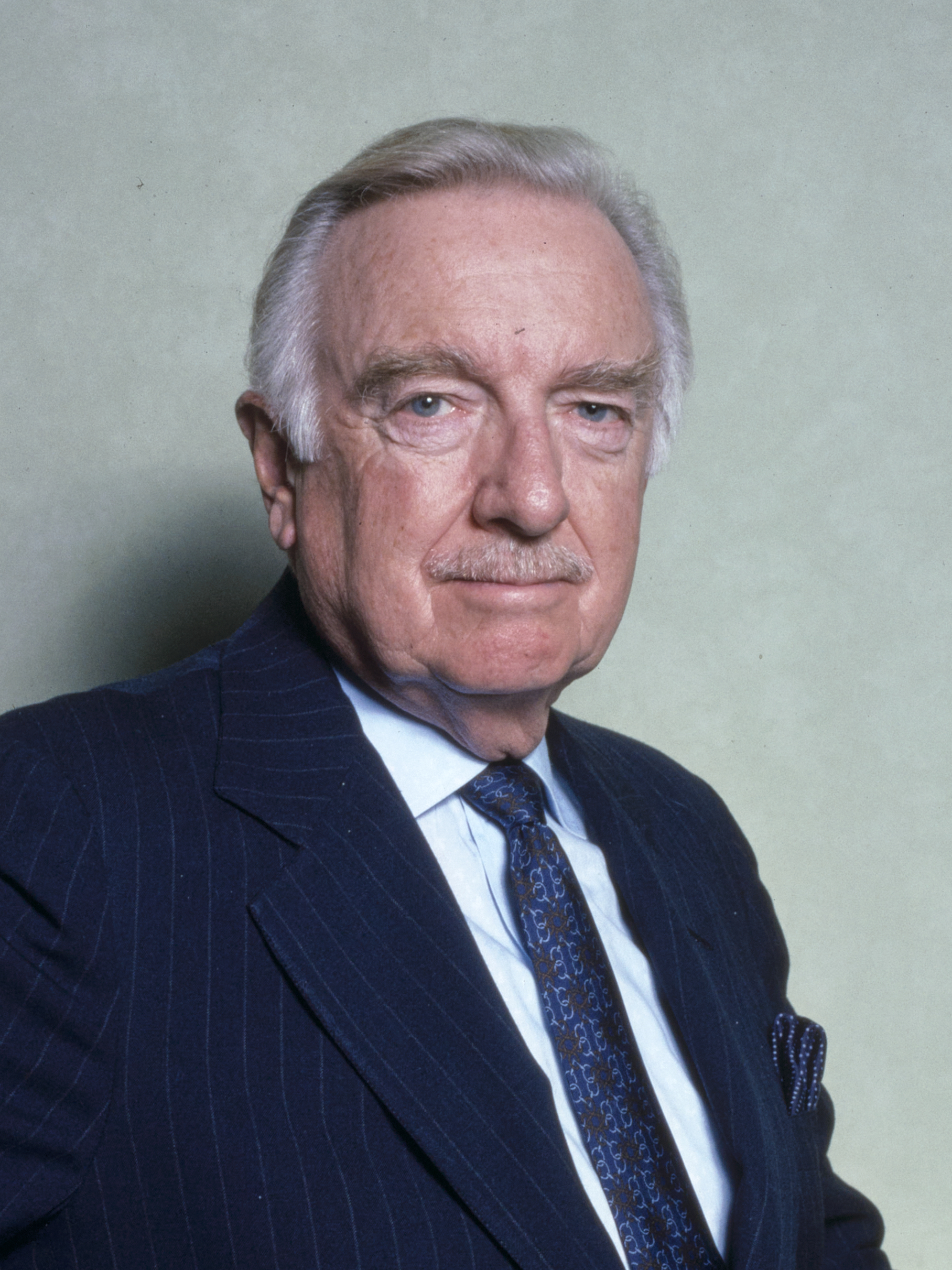
- Cronkite in 1983
- Born: Walter Leland Cronkite Jr. November 4, 1916; St. Joseph, Missouri, U.S.
- Died: July 17, 2009 (aged 92); New York City, U.S.
- Resting place: Mount Moriah Cemetery, Kansas City, Missouri, U.S.
- Occupations: Television and radio broadcaster; news anchor
- Years active: 1935–2009
- Spouse: Mary Elizabeth "Betsy" Maxwell (m. 1940; died 2005)
- Children: 3, including Kathy
- Relatives: Deborah Rush (daughter-in-law)

Walter Leland Cronkite Jr. (November 4, 1916 – July 17, 2009) was an American broadcast journalist who served as anchorman for the CBS Evening News from 1962 to 1981. During the 1960s and 1970s, he was often cited as "the most trusted man in America" after being so named in an opinion poll. Cronkite received numerous honors including two Peabody Awards, a George Polk Award, an Emmy Award, and the Presidential Medal of Freedom.

Cronkite reported many events from 1937 to 1981, including bombings in World War II; the Nuremberg trials; combat in the Vietnam War; the Dawson's Field hijackings; Watergate; the Iran hostage crisis; and the assassinations of President John F. Kennedy, civil rights pioneer Martin Luther King Jr., and Beatles musician John Lennon. He was also known for his extensive coverage of the American space program, from Project Mercury to the Moon landings to the Space Shuttle. He was the only non-NASA recipient of an Ambassador of Exploration award. Cronkite is known for his departing catchphrase, "And that's the way it is," followed by the date of the broadcast.

== Early life and education ==
Cronkite was born on November 4, 1916, in Saint Joseph, Missouri, the son of Helen Lena (née Fritsche) and Dr. Walter Leland Cronkite, a dentist.

Cronkite lived in Kansas City, Missouri, until he was 10, when his family moved to Houston, Texas. He attended elementary school at Woodrow Wilson Elementary School (now Baker Montessori School), junior high school at Lanier Junior High School (now Lanier Middle School) in Houston, and high school at San Jacinto High School, where he edited the high school newspaper. He was a member of the Boy Scouts. He attended college at the University of Texas at Austin (UT), entering in the fall term of 1933, where he worked on the Daily Texan and became a member of the Nu chapter of the Chi Phi fraternity. He interviewed Gertrude Stein when she visited the university. He also was a member of the Houston chapter of DeMolay, a Masonic fraternal organization for boys.

While attending UT, Cronkite had his first experience in performance, appearing in a play with fellow student Eli Wallach. He dropped out in 1935, not returning for the fall term, to concentrate on journalism.

== Career ==
Cronkite left college in his junior year, in the fall term of 1935, after starting a series of newspaper reporting jobs covering news and sports. He entered broadcasting as a radio announcer for WKY in Oklahoma City, Oklahoma. In 1936, he met his future wife, Mary Elizabeth "Betsy" Maxwell, while working as the sports announcer for KCMO (AM) in Kansas City, Missouri. His broadcast name was Walter Wilcox.

He later explained that radio stations at the time did not want people to use their real names for fear of taking their listeners with them if they left. In Kansas City, he joined the United Press International (UP) in 1937.

With his name now established, he received a job offer from Edward R. Murrow at CBS News to join the Murrow Boys team of war correspondents, relieving Bill Downs as the head of the Moscow bureau. CBS offered Cronkite $125 (equivalent to $2,900 in 2025) per week along with "commercial fees" amounting to $25 (equivalent to $580.04 in 2025) for almost every time Cronkite reported on air. Until then, he had been making $57.50 (equivalent to $1,334 in 2025) per week at UP, but he had reservations about broadcasting. He initially accepted the offer. When he informed his boss Harrison Salisbury, UP countered with a raise of $17.50 (equivalent to $406.03 in 2025) per week; Hugh Baillie also offered him an extra $20 (equivalent to $464.03 in 2025) per week to stay. Cronkite ultimately accepted the UP offer, which angered Murrow who held a grudge for years.

Cronkite became one of the top American reporters in World War II, covering battles in North Africa and Europe. He was aboard USS Texas starting in Norfolk, Virginia, through her service off the coast of North Africa as part of Operation Torch, and then back to the US. On the return trip, Cronkite was flown off Texas in one of her Vought OS2U Kingfisher aircraft when Norfolk was within flying distance. He was granted permission to be flown the rest of the distance to Norfolk so that he could outpace a rival correspondent on USS Massachusetts to return to the US and to issue the first uncensored news reports to be published about Operation Torch. Cronkite's experiences aboard Texas launched his career as a war correspondent. Subsequently, he was one of eight journalists selected by the United States Army Air Forces to fly bombing raids over Germany in a Boeing B-17 Flying Fortress as part of group called The Writing 69th, and during a mission fired a machine gun at a German fighter. He also landed in a glider with the 101st Airborne Division in Operation Market Garden and covered the Battle of the Bulge. After the war, he covered the Nuremberg trials and served as the United Press main reporter in Moscow from 1946 to 1948.

=== Early years at CBS ===
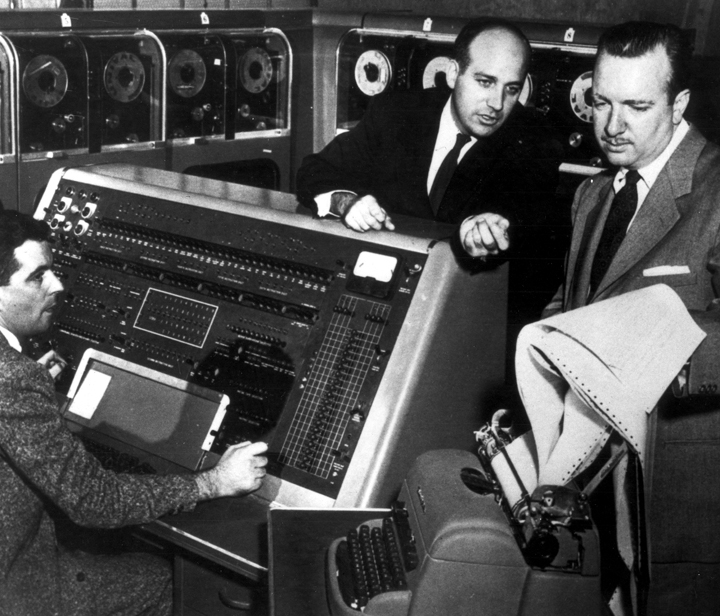
Walter Cronkite with a Weather Computer in 1952

In 1950, Cronkite joined CBS News in its young and growing television division, again recruited by Murrow. Cronkite began working at WTOP-TV (now WUSA), the CBS affiliate in Washington, D.C. He originally served as anchor of the network's 15-minute late-Sunday-evening newscast Up to the Minute, which followed What's My Line? at 11:00 pm ET from 1951 through 1962.

Although it was widely reported that the term "anchor" was coined to describe Cronkite's role at both the Democratic and Republican National Conventions, marking the first nationally televised convention coverage, other news presenters bore the title before him. Cronkite anchored the network's broadcasts of the 1952 presidential conventions, as well as its broadcasts of later conventions. In 1964 he was temporarily replaced by the team of Robert Trout and Roger Mudd; this proved to be a mistake, and Cronkite returned to the anchor chair for future political conventions.

From 1953 to 1957, Cronkite hosted the CBS program You Are There, which reenacted historical events, using the format of a news report. His famous last line for these programs was: "What sort of day was it? A day like all days, filled with those events that alter and illuminate our times ... and you were there." In 1971, the show was revived and redesigned to attract an audience of teenagers and young adults, hosted again by Cronkite on Saturday mornings. In 1957, he began hosting The Twentieth Century (eventually renamed The 20th Century), a documentary series about important historical events of the century composed almost exclusively of newsreel footage and interviews. A long-running hit, the show was again renamed as The 21st Century in 1967 with Cronkite hosting speculative reporting on the future for another three years. Cronkite also hosted It's News to Me, a game show based on news events.

During the presidential elections of 1952 and 1956 Cronkite hosted the CBS news-discussion series Pick the Winner.

Another of his network assignments was The Morning Show, CBS' short-lived challenge to NBC's Today in 1954. His on-air duties included interviewing guests and chatting with a lion puppet named Charlemane about the news. He considered this discourse with a puppet as "one of the highlights" of the show. He added, "A puppet can render opinions on people and things that a human commentator would not feel free to utter. I was and I am proud of it." Cronkite also angered the R. J. Reynolds Tobacco Company, the show's sponsor, by grammatically correcting its advertising slogan. Instead of saying "Winston tastes good like a cigarette should" verbatim, he substituted "as" for "like."

He was the lead broadcaster of the network's coverage of the 1960 Winter Olympics, the first-ever time such an event was televised in the United States. He replaced Jim McKay, who had suffered a mental breakdown.

=== Anchor of the CBS Evening News ===
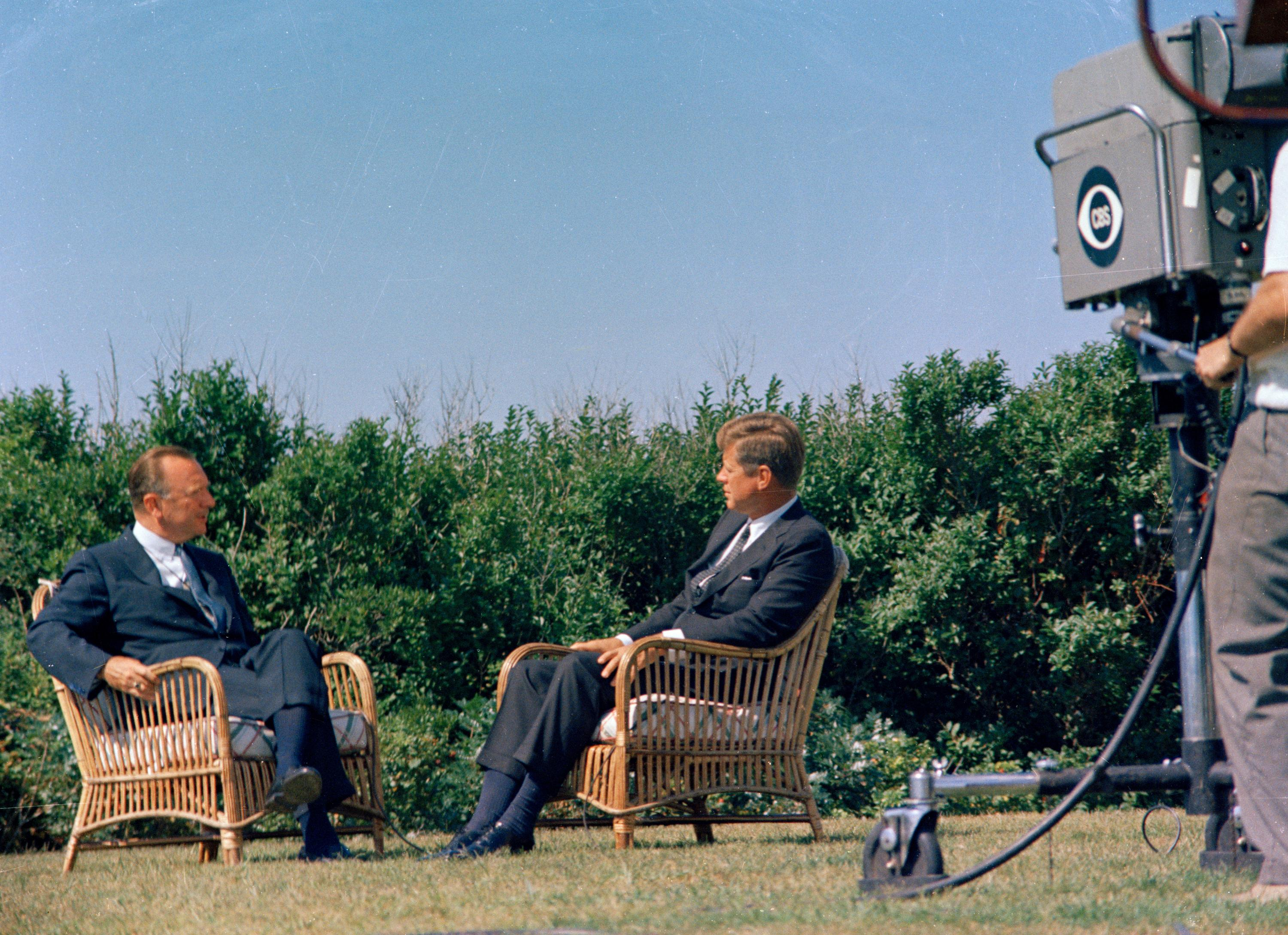
Cronkite interviewed President John F. Kennedy to inaugurate the first half-hour nightly news broadcast in 1963.

On April 16, 1962, Cronkite succeeded Douglas Edwards as anchorman of CBS's nightly feature newscast, tentatively renamed Walter Cronkite with the News, but later the CBS Evening News on September 2, 1963, when the show was expanded from 15 to 30 minutes, making Cronkite the anchor of American network television's first nightly half-hour news program. Cronkite's tenure as anchor of the CBS Evening News made him an icon in television news.

During the early part of his tenure anchoring the CBS Evening News, Cronkite competed against NBC's anchor team of Chet Huntley and David Brinkley, who anchored The Huntley–Brinkley Report. For much of the 1960s, The Huntley–Brinkley Report had more viewers than Cronkite's broadcast. A key moment for Cronkite came during his coverage of John F. Kennedy's assassination on November 22, 1963. Another factor in Cronkite and CBS' ascendancy to the top of the ratings was that, as the decade progressed, RCA made a corporate decision not to fund NBC News at the levels that CBS provided for its news broadcasts. Consequently, CBS News acquired a reputation for greater accuracy and depth in coverage. This reputation meshed well with Cronkite's wire service experience, and in 1967 the CBS Evening News began to surpass The Huntley–Brinkley Report in viewership during the summer months.

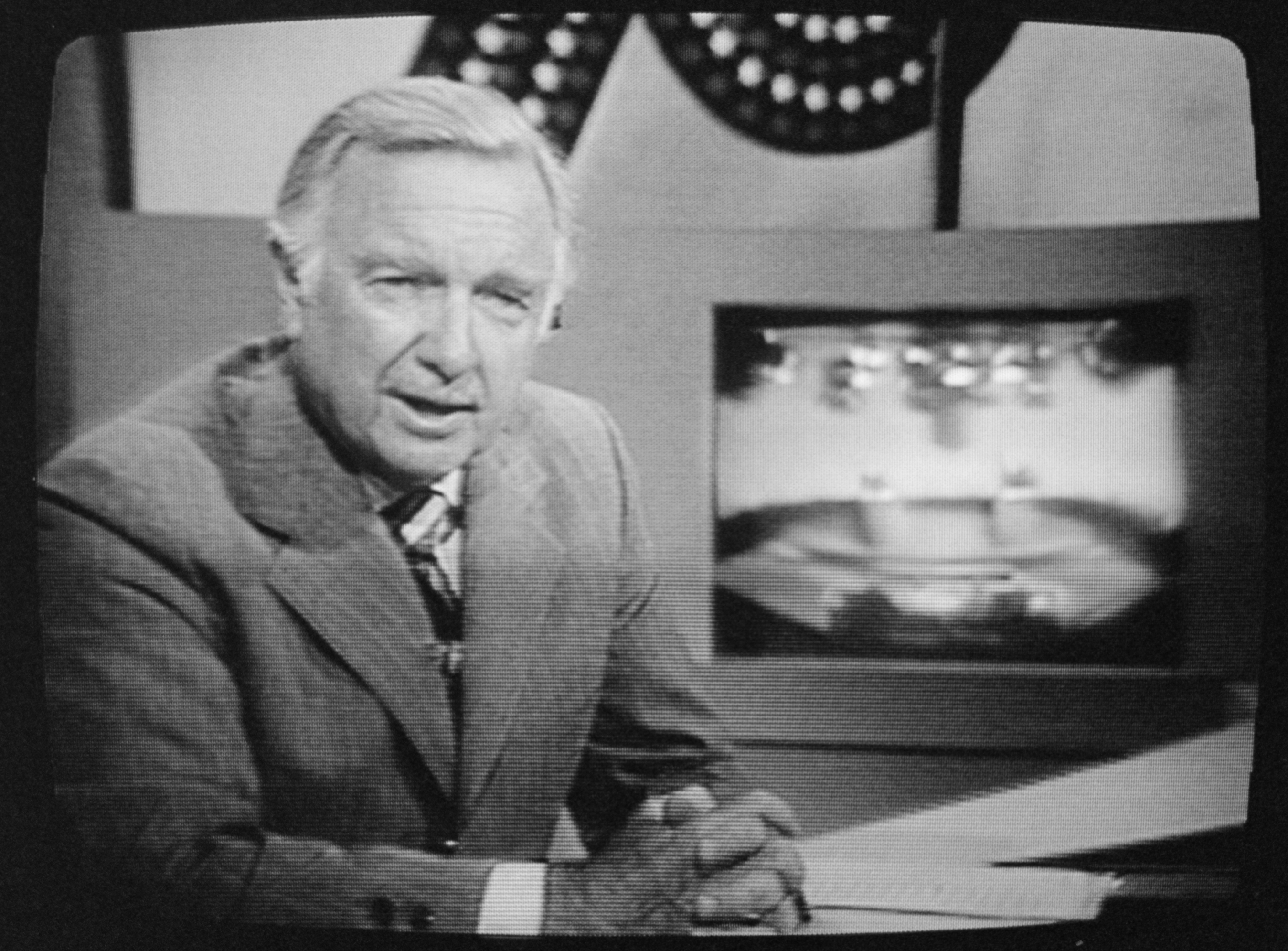
Walter Cronkite was on television during the 1st presidential debate between Gerald Ford and Jimmy Carter in 1976.

In 1969, during the Apollo 11 (with co-host and former astronaut Wally Schirra) and Apollo 13 Moon missions, Cronkite received the best ratings and made CBS the most-watched television network for the missions. In 1970, when Huntley retired, the CBS Evening News finally dominated the American TV news viewing audience. Although NBC finally settled on the skilled and well-respected broadcast journalist John Chancellor, Cronkite proved to be more popular and continued to be top-rated until his retirement in 1981.

One of Cronkite's trademarks was ending the CBS Evening News with the phrase "...And that's the way it is," followed by the date. Keeping to standards of objective journalism, he omitted this phrase on nights when he ended the newscast with opinion or commentary. Beginning with January 16, 1980, Day 50 of the Iran hostage crisis, Cronkite added the length of the hostages' captivity to the show's closing in order to remind the audience of the unresolved situation, ending only on Day 444, January 20, 1981.

== Historic moments ==
=== Kennedy's assassination ===
Cronkite broke the news of the assassination of John F. Kennedy on Friday, November 22, 1963. He had been standing at the United Press International wire machine in the CBS newsroom as the bulletin of the president's shooting broke and he prepared to get on the air.

There was no television camera in the studio, as the technical crew was working on it. Eventually, the camera was retrieved and brought back to the newsroom. Because of the magnitude of the story and the continuous flow of information coming from various sources, time was of the essence but the camera would take at least twenty minutes to become operational under normal circumstances. The decision was made to dispatch Cronkite to the CBS Radio Network booth to report the events and play the audio over the television airwaves while the crew worked on the camera to see if they could get it set up quicker.

CBS was ten minutes into its live broadcast of the soap opera As the World Turns (ATWT), which had begun at the very minute of the shooting. A "CBS News Bulletin" bumper slide abruptly broke into the broadcast at 1:40 pm EST. Over the slide, Cronkite began reading what would be the first of three audio-only bulletins that were filed in the next twenty minutes,

Here is a bulletin from CBS News: in Dallas, Texas, three shots were fired at President Kennedy's motorcade in downtown Dallas. The first reports say that President Kennedy has been seriously wounded by this shooting.

While Cronkite was reading this bulletin, a second one arrived, mentioning the severity of Kennedy's wounds,

...President Kennedy shot today just as his motorcade left downtown Dallas. Mrs. Kennedy jumped up and grabbed Mr. Kennedy, she called, "Oh no!", the motorcade sped on. United Press [International] says that the wounds for President Kennedy perhaps could be fatal. Repeating, a bulletin from CBS News: President Kennedy has been shot by a would-be assassin in Dallas, Texas. Stay tuned to CBS News for further details.

Just before the bulletin cut out, a CBS News staffer was heard saying "Connally too", apparently having just heard the news that Texas Governor John Connally had also been shot while riding in the presidential limousine with his wife Nellie and President and Mrs. Kennedy.

CBS then rejoined the telecast of ATWT during a commercial break, which was followed by show announcer Dan McCullough's usual fee plug for the first half of the program and the network's 1:45 pm station identification break. Just before the second half of ATWT was to begin, the network broke in again with the bumper slide. In this bulletin Cronkite reported in greater detail about the assassination attempt on the president, while also breaking the news of Governor Connally's shooting,

...President Kennedy was shot as he drove from Dallas Airport to downtown Dallas; Governor Connally of Texas, in the car with him, was also shot. It is reported that three bullets rang out. A Secret Service man has been...was heard to shout from the car, "He's dead". Whether he referred to President Kennedy or not is not yet known. The President, cradled in the arms of his wife Mrs. Kennedy, was carried to an ambulance and the car rushed to Parkland Hospital outside Dallas, the President was taken to an emergency room in the hospital. Other White House officials were in doubt in the corridors of the hospital as to the condition of President Kennedy. Repeating this bulletin: President Kennedy shot while driving in an open car from the airport in Dallas, Texas, to downtown Dallas.

Cronkite recapped the events as they had happened, that the President and Governor Connally had been shot and were in the emergency room at Parkland Hospital, and no one knew their condition as yet. CBS then decided to return to ATWT, which was now midway through its second segment.

The cast had continued to perform live while Cronkite's bulletins broke into the broadcast, unaware of the unfolding events in Dallas. ATWT then took another scheduled commercial break. The segment before the break would be the last scheduled network programme until Tuesday, November 26. During the commercial, the bumper slide interrupted the proceedings again and Cronkite updated the viewers on the situation in Dallas. This bulletin went into more detail than the other two, revealing that Kennedy had been shot in the head and Connally in the chest. Cronkite remained on the air for the next ten minutes, continuing to read bulletins as they were handed to him and recapping the events as they were known. He also related a report given to reporters by Texas Congressman Albert Thomas that the President and Governor were still alive, the first indication of their condition. At 2:00 pm EST, with the top of the hour station break approaching, Cronkite told the audience that there would be a brief pause so that all of CBS' affiliates, including those in the Mountain and Pacific time zones which were not on the same schedule, could join the network. He then left the radio booth and went to the anchor desk in the newsroom.

Within twenty seconds of the announcement, every CBS affiliate except Dallas's KRLD (which was providing local coverage) was airing the network's feed. The camera was finally operational by this time and enabled the audience to see Cronkite, who was wearing a suit and tie but not his suit coat, given the urgent nature of the story. Cronkite reminded the audience of the assassination attempt and handed to KRLD news director Eddie Barker at the Dallas Trade Mart, where Kennedy was supposed to be making a speech before he was shot. Barker relayed information that Kennedy's condition was critical. Then, after a prayer for Kennedy, Barker quoted an unofficial report that the president was dead but stressed it was not certain.

After several minutes, the coverage returned to the CBS newsroom where Cronkite reported that the president had been given blood transfusions and two priests had been called into the room. He also played an audio report from KRLD that someone had been arrested in the assassination attempt at the Texas School Book Depository. In Dallas, Barker announced another report of the death of the president, mentioning that it came from a reliable source. Before the network left KRLD's feed, Barker first announced, then retracted, a confirmation of Kennedy's death.

CBS cut back to Cronkite reporting that one of the priests had administered last rites to the president. In the next few minutes, several more bulletins reporting that Kennedy had died were given to Cronkite, including one from CBS's own correspondent Dan Rather that had been reported as confirmation of Kennedy's death by CBS Radio. As these bulletins came into the newsroom, it was becoming clearer that Kennedy had died. Cronkite stressed that these bulletins were reports and not an official confirmation of the president's condition; some of his colleagues recounted in 2013 that his early career as a wire service reporter taught him to wait for official word before reporting a story. Still, as more word came in, Cronkite seemed to be resigned to the fact that it was only a matter of time before the assassination was confirmed. He appeared to concede this when, several minutes after he received the Rather report, he received word that the two priests who gave the last rites to Kennedy told reporters on the scene that he was dead. Cronkite said that report "seems to be as close to official as we can get" but would not declare it as such. Nor did he do so with a report from Washington, DC that came moments later, which said that government sources were now reporting the president was dead (this information was passed on to ABC as well, which took it as official confirmation and reported it as such; NBC did not report this information at all and chose instead to rely on reports from Charles Murphy and Robert MacNeil to confirm their suspicions).

At 2:38 pm EST, while filling time with some observations about the security presence in Dallas, which had been increased due to violent acts against United Nations Ambassador Adlai Stevenson in the city earlier that year, Cronkite was handed a new bulletin. After looking it over for a moment, he took off his glasses, and made the official announcement,

From Dallas, Texas, the flash, apparently official: (reading AP flash) "President Kennedy died at 1 p.m. Central Standard Time." (glancing up at clock) 2 o'clock Eastern Standard Time, some 38 minutes ago.

After making that announcement, Cronkite paused briefly, put his glasses back on, and swallowed hard to maintain his composure. With noticeable emotion in his voice he read the next sentence of the news report:

Vice President Johnson (clears throat) has left the hospital in Dallas, but we do not know to where he has proceeded; presumably he will be taking the oath of office shortly and become the 36th President of the United States.

With emotion still in his voice and eyes watering, Cronkite once again recapped the events after collecting himself, incorporating some wire photos of the visit and explaining the significance of the pictures now that Kennedy was dead. He reminded the viewers that Vice President Johnson was now the President and was to be sworn in, that Governor Connally's condition was still unknown, and that there was no report of whether the assassin had been captured. He then handed the anchor position to Charles Collingwood, who had just entered the newsroom, took his suit coat, and left the room for a while.

At about 3:30 pm EST, Cronkite returned to the newsroom to relay some new information. The two major pieces of information involved the Oath of Office being administered to President Johnson, and that Dallas police had arrested a man named Lee Harvey Oswald whom they suspected had fired the fatal shots. After that, Cronkite left again to begin preparing for that night's CBS Evening News, which he returned to anchor as normal. For the next four days, along with his colleagues, Cronkite continued to report segments of uninterrupted coverage of the assassination, including the announcement of Oswald's death at the hands of Jack Ruby on Sunday. The next day, on the day of the funeral, Cronkite concluded the CBS Evening News with the following assessment about the events of the last four dark days:

It is said that the human mind has a greater capacity for remembering the pleasant than the unpleasant. But today was a day that will live in memory and in grief. Only history can write the importance of this day: Were these dark days the harbingers of even blacker ones to come, or like the black before the dawn shall they lead to some still as yet indiscernible sunrise of understanding among men, that violent words, no matter what their origin or motivation, can lead only to violent deeds? This is the larger question that will be answered, in part, in the manner that a shaken civilization seeks the answers to the immediate question: Who, and most importantly what, was Lee Harvey Oswald? The world's doubts must be put to rest. Tonight there will be few Americans who will go to bed without carrying with them the sense that somehow they have failed. If in the search of our conscience we find a new dedication to the American concepts that brought no political, sectional, religious or racial divisions, then maybe it may yet be possible to say that John Fitzgerald Kennedy did not die in vain. That's the way it is, Monday, November 25, 1963. This is Walter Cronkite, good night.

Referring to his coverage of Kennedy's assassination, in a 2006 TV interview with Nick Clooney, Cronkite recalled:

I choked up, I really had a little trouble...my eyes got a little wet...[what Kennedy had represented] was just all lost to us. Fortunately, I grabbed hold before I was actually [crying]."

In a 2003 CBS special commemorating the 40th anniversary of the assassination, Cronkite recalled his reaction upon having the death confirmed to him, he said:

And when you finally had to say it's official, the President is dead...pretty tough words in a situation like that. And they were, um, hard to come by.

According to historian Douglas Brinkley, Cronkite provided a sense of perspective throughout the unfolding sequence of disturbing events.

=== Vietnam War ===
In mid-February 1968, on the urging of his executive producer Ernest Leiser, Cronkite and Leiser journeyed to Vietnam to cover the aftermath of the Tet Offensive. They were invited to dine with General Creighton Abrams, the deputy commander of all forces in Vietnam, whom Cronkite knew from World War II. According to Leiser, Abrams told Cronkite, "we cannot win this Goddamned war, and we ought to find a dignified way out."

Upon return, Cronkite and Leiser wrote separate editorial reports based on that trip. Cronkite, an excellent writer, preferred Leiser's text over his own. On February 27, 1968, Cronkite closed "Report from Vietnam: Who, What, When, Where, Why?" with that editorial report:

We have been too often disappointed by the optimism of the American leaders, both in Vietnam and Washington, to have faith any longer in the silver linings they find in the darkest clouds. They may be right, that Hanoi's winter-spring offensive has been forced by the Communist realization that they could not win the longer war of attrition, and that the Communists hope that any success in the offensive will improve their position for eventual negotiations. It would improve their position, and it would also require our realization, that we should have had all along, that any negotiations must be that – negotiations, not the dictation of peace terms. For it seems now more certain than ever that the bloody experience of Vietnam is to end in a stalemate. This summer's almost certain standoff will either end in real give-and-take negotiations or terrible escalation; and for every means we have to escalate, the enemy can match us, and that applies to invasion of the North, the use of nuclear weapons, or the mere commitment of one hundred, or two hundred, or three hundred thousand more American troops to the battle. And with each escalation, the world comes closer to the brink of cosmic disaster. To say that we are closer to victory today is to believe, in the face of the evidence, the optimists who have been wrong in the past. To suggest we are on the edge of defeat is to yield to unreasonable pessimism. To say that we are mired in stalemate seems the only realistic, yet unsatisfactory, conclusion. On the off chance that military and political analysts are right, in the next few months we must test the enemy's intentions, in case this is indeed his last big gasp before negotiations. But it is increasingly clear to this reporter that the only rational way out then will be to negotiate, not as victors, but as an honorable people who lived up to their pledge to defend democracy, and did the best they could.

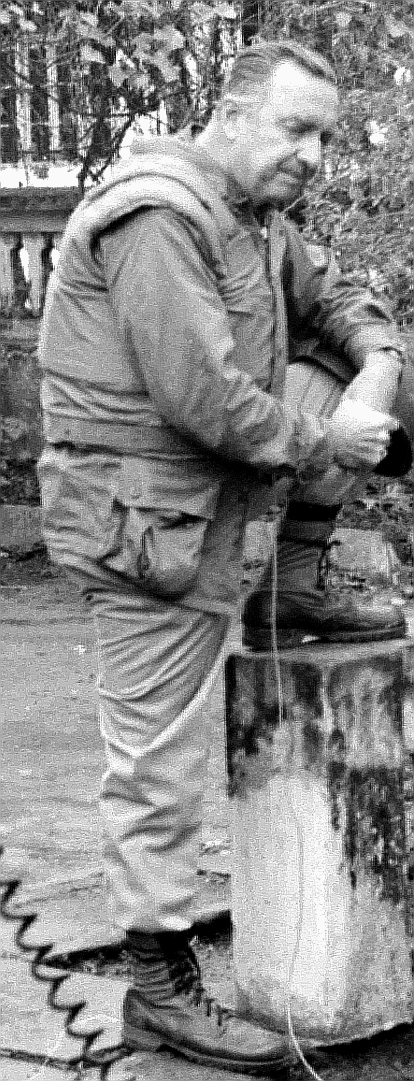
Cronkite reported on location during the Vietnam War in 1968.

Following Cronkite's editorial report, President Lyndon B. Johnson is claimed by some to have said, "If I've lost Cronkite, I've lost Middle America." However, this account of Johnson has been questioned by other observers in books on journalistic accuracy. At the time the editorial aired, Johnson was in Austin, Texas, attending Texas Governor John Connally's birthday gala and was giving a speech in his honor.

In his book This Just In: What I Couldn't Tell You on TV, CBS News correspondent Bob Schieffer, who was serving as a reporter for the Fort Worth Star-Telegram when Cronkite's editorial aired, acknowledged that Johnson did not see the original broadcast but also defended the allegation that Johnson had made the remark. According to Schieffer, Johnson's aide George Christian "told me that the President apparently saw some clips of it the next day" and that "That's when he made the remark about Cronkite. But he knew then that it would take more than Americans were willing to give it." When asked about the remark during a 1979 interview, Christian claimed he had no recollection about what the President had said. In his 1996 memoir A Reporter's Life, Cronkite claimed he was at first unsure about how much of an impact his editorial report had on Johnson's decision to drop his bid for re-election, and what eventually convinced him the President had made the statement was a recount from Bill Moyers, a journalist and former aide to Johnson.

Several weeks later, Johnson, who sought to preserve his legacy and was now convinced his declining health could not withstand growing public criticism, announced he would not seek reelection.

During the 1968 Democratic National Convention in Chicago, Cronkite was anchoring the CBS network coverage as violence and protests occurred outside the convention, as well as scuffles inside the convention hall. When Dan Rather was punched to the floor (on camera) by security personnel, Cronkite commented, "I think we've got a bunch of thugs here, Dan."

=== Other historic events ===
The first publicly transmitted live trans-Atlantic program was broadcast via the Telstar satellite on July 23, 1962, at 3:00 pm EDT, and Cronkite was one of the main presenters in this multinational broadcast. The broadcast was made possible in Europe by Eurovision and in North America by NBC, CBS, ABC, and the CBC. The first public broadcast featured CBS's Cronkite and NBC's Chet Huntley in New York, and the BBC's Richard Dimbleby in Brussels. Cronkite was in the New York studio at Rockefeller Plaza as the first pictures to be transmitted and received were the Statue of Liberty in New York and the Eiffel Tower in Paris. The first segment included a televised major league baseball game between the Philadelphia Phillies and the Chicago Cubs at Wrigley Field. From there, the video switched first to Washington, D.C.; then to Cape Canaveral, Florida; then to Quebec City, Quebec, and finally to Stratford, Ontario. The Washington segment included a press conference with President Kennedy, talking about the price of the American dollar, which was causing concern in Europe. This broadcast inaugurated live intercontinental news coverage, which was perfected later in the sixties with Early Bird and other Intelsat satellites.

On November 22, 1963, Cronkite introduced the Beatles to the United States by airing a four-minute story about the band on the CBS Morning News. The story was scheduled to be shown again on the CBS Evening News that same day, but the assassination of John F. Kennedy prevented the broadcast of the regular evening news. The Beatles story was aired on the evening news program on December 10.

General of the Army Dwight D. Eisenhower returned to his former Supreme Headquarters Allied Expeditionary Force (SHAEF) headquarters for an interview by Cronkite on the CBS News Special Report D-Day + 20, telecast on June 6, 1964.

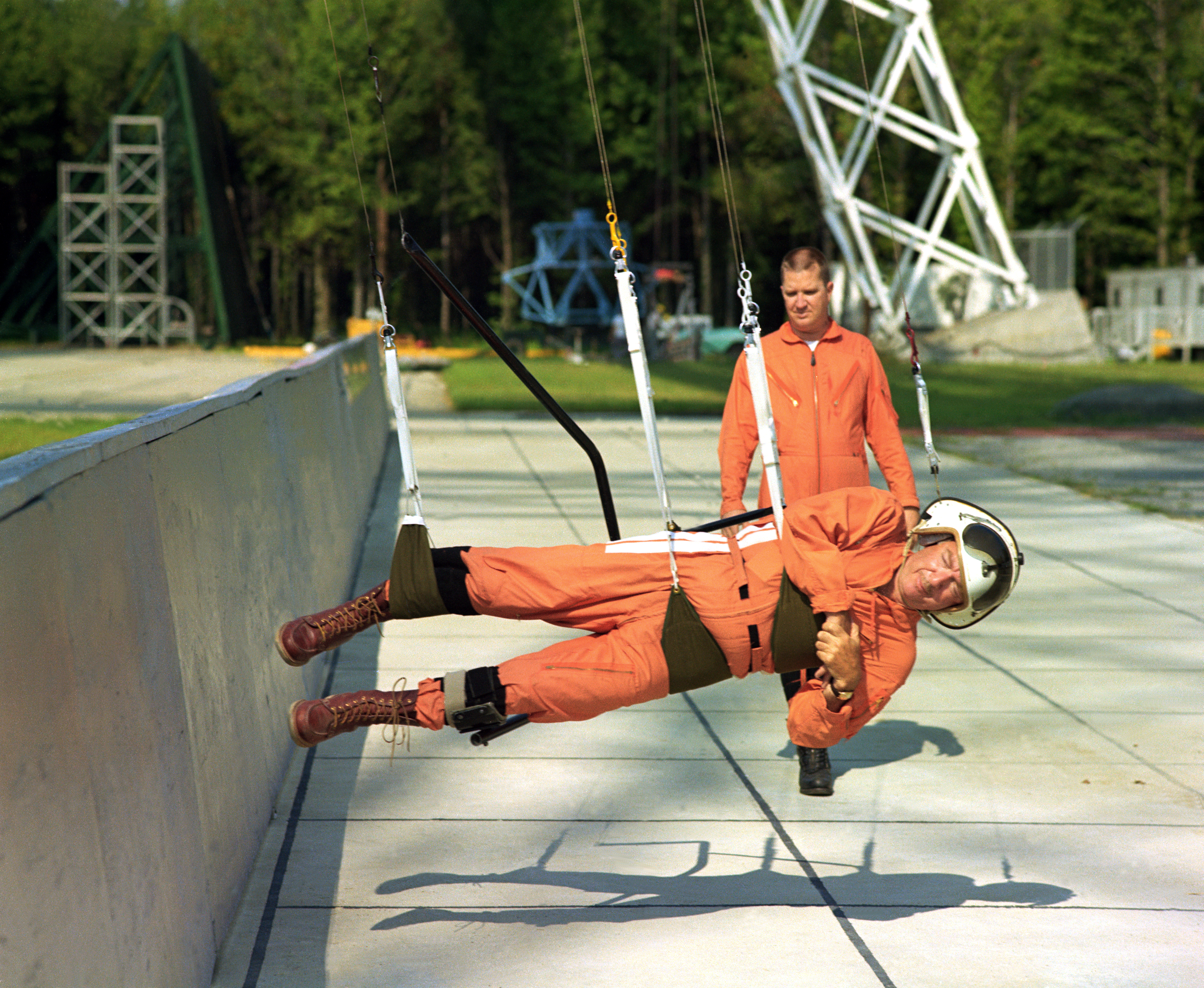
Cronkite demonstrated the Reduced Gravity Walking Simulator, that was used for astronaut training before the Moon landings (1968).

Cronkite is remembered for his coverage of the United States space program, and at times was visibly enthusiastic, rubbing his hands together on camera with a smile and uttering, "Whew...boy" on July 20, 1969, when the Apollo 11 lunar landing mission put the first men on the Moon.

Cronkite participated in Richard Nixon's 1972 visit to China. Because Cronkite was colorblind, he had to ask others what color of coat First Lady Pat Nixon was wearing when they disembarked in Peking (Beijing).

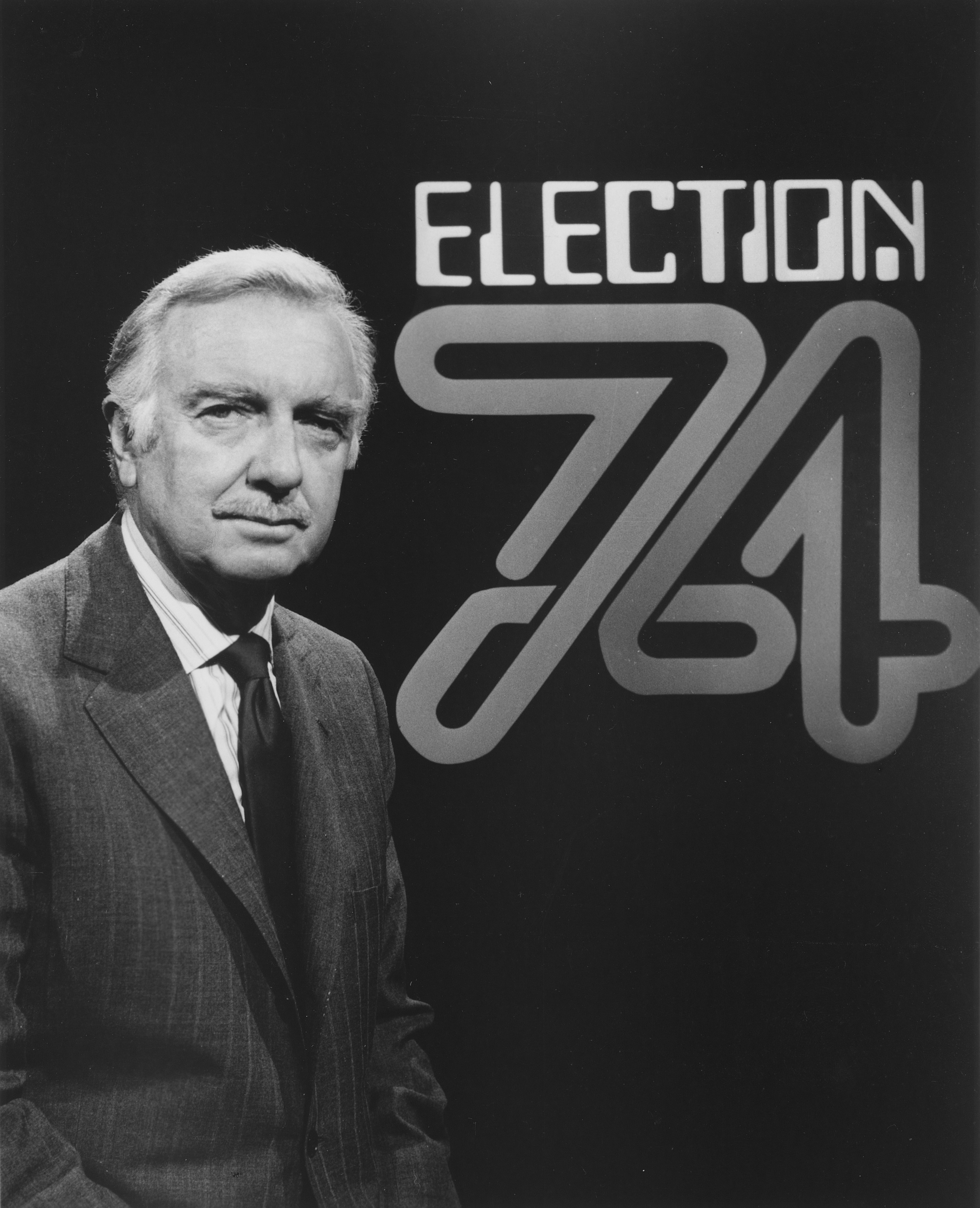
Cronkite in a 1974 promotional image regarding the 1974 elections; the first to take place after Nixon's resignation

According to the 2006 Public Broadcasting Service (PBS) documentary on Cronkite, there was "nothing new" in his reports on the Watergate affair; however, Cronkite brought together a wide range of reporting, and his credibility and status is credited by many with pushing the Watergate story to the forefront with the American public, ultimately resulting in the resignation of President Richard M. Nixon on August 9, 1974. Cronkite had anchored the CBS coverage of Nixon's address, announcing his impending resignation, the night before.

The January 22, 1973, broadcast of the CBS Evening News saw Cronkite break the news of the death of another notable American political figure. At approximately 6:38 pm Eastern Time, while a pre-recorded report that the Vietnam peace talks in Paris had been successful was being played for the audience, Cronkite received a telephone call in the studio while off camera. The call was from Tom Johnson, the former press secretary for President Lyndon B. Johnson, who was at the time serving as station manager of KTBC-TV, which at the time was the CBS affiliate in Austin, Texas and had been owned by the former President until recently.

The pre-recorded report was cut short while Cronkite was talking to Johnson, and when the live camera returned Cronkite had the telephone receiver held to his ear. Once he was told he was back on the air, Cronkite briefly nodded and held up one of his fingers to let the audience and studio crew know he needed a moment to let Johnson finish talking before he relayed the topic of conversation to the nation watching. Once Johnson finished talking, Cronkite thanked him and asked him to stay on the line as he reported the following:

I'm talking to Tom Johnson, the press secretary for Lyndon Johnson, who has reported that the thirty-sixth President of the United States died this afternoon in a...ambulance plane on the way to San Antonio, where he was taken after being stricken at his ranch- the LBJ Ranch, in Johnson City, Texas. He was stricken at 3:40 pm, Central Standard Time, 4:40...Eastern Standard Time. Three agents who were at the scene, who are permanently attached to the ranch to protect the President, uh, went to his immediate aid, gave him all emergency aid they could, put him in a plane, I suppose, Tom, one of the President's own planes? *pauses to wait for response* Colonel George McGranahan, who was the man who proclaimed the President dead upon arrival at Brooke Army General Hospital, in San Antonio. *pauses again* And Mrs. Johnson was notified of the events at her office in Austin and flew immediately to San Antonio and Tom Johnson, no relation, the President's news secretary, has told me that from Austin.

During the final ten minutes of that broadcast, Cronkite reported on the death, giving a retrospective on the life of the nation's 36th president, and announced that CBS would air a special on Johnson later that evening. This story was re-told on a 2007 CBS-TV special honoring Cronkite's 90th birthday.

== Retirement ==
On February 14, 1980, Cronkite announced that he intended to retire from the CBS Evening News; at the time, CBS had a policy of mandatory retirement by age 65. Although sometimes compared to a father figure or an uncle figure, in an interview about his retirement he described himself as being more like a "comfortable old shoe" to his audience. His last day in the anchor chair at the CBS Evening News was on March 6, 1981; he was succeeded the following Monday by Dan Rather.

Cronkite's farewell statement:

This is my last broadcast as the anchorman of The CBS Evening News; for me, it's a moment for which I long have planned, but which, nevertheless, comes with some sadness. For almost two decades, after all, we've been meeting like this in the evenings, and I'll miss that. But those who have made anything of this departure, I'm afraid have made too much. This is but a transition, a passing of the baton. A great broadcaster and gentleman, Doug Edwards, preceded me in this job, and another, Dan Rather, will follow. And anyway, the person who sits here is but the most conspicuous member of a superb team of journalists; writers, reporters, editors, producers, and none of that will change. Furthermore, I'm not even going away! I'll be back from time to time with special news reports and documentaries, and, beginning in June, every week, with our science program, Universe. Old anchormen, you see, don't fade away; they just keep coming back for more. And that's the way it is: Friday, March 6, 1981. I'll be away on assignment, and Dan Rather will be sitting in here for the next few years. Good night.

On the eve of Cronkite's retirement, he appeared on The Tonight Show hosted by Johnny Carson. The following night, Carson did a comic spoof of his on-air farewell address.

== Other activities ==
=== Post-CBS Evening News ===
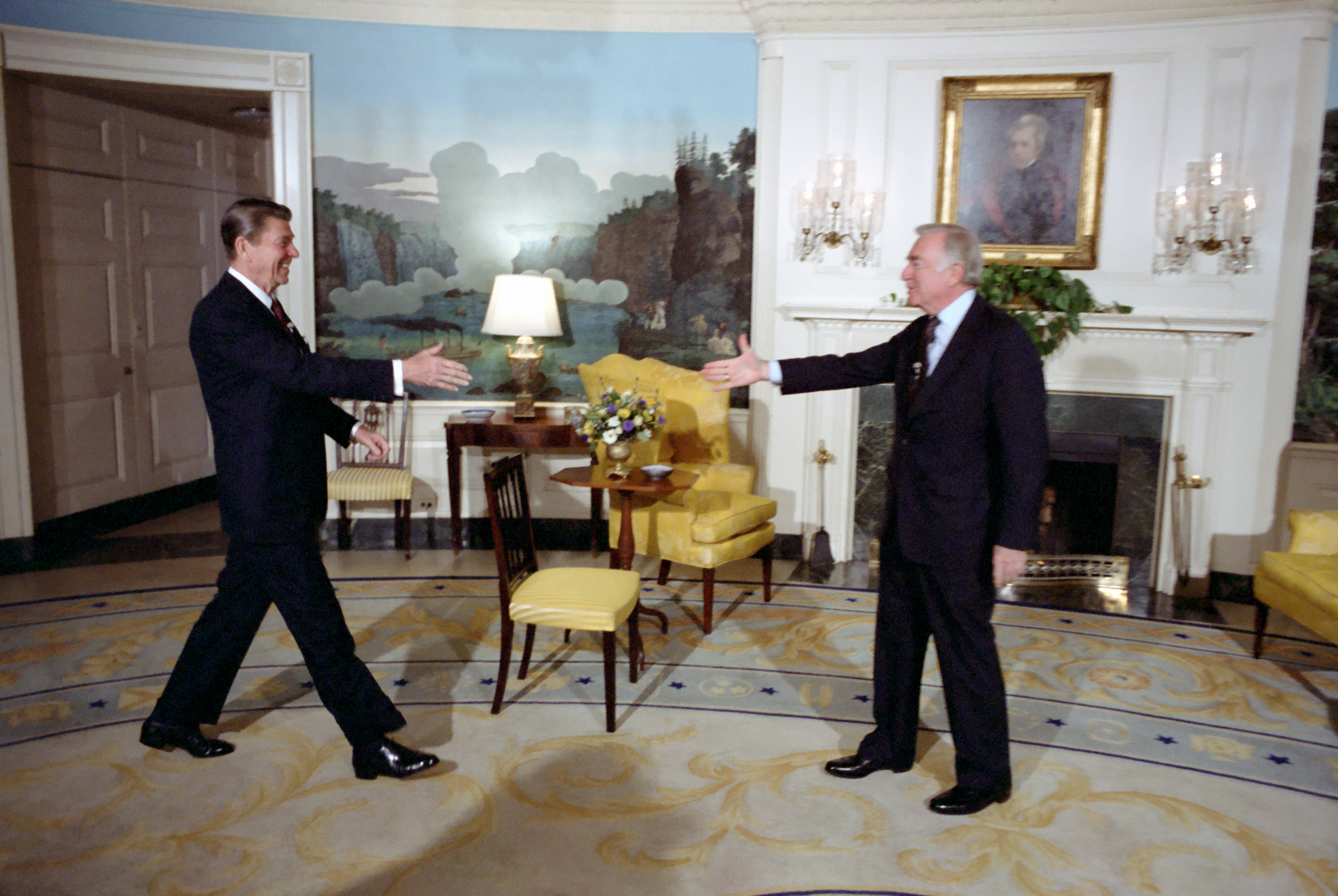
Cronkite met with President Ronald Reagan at the White House in 1981.

As he had promised on his last show as anchor in 1981, Cronkite continued to broadcast occasionally as a special correspondent for CBS, CNN, and NPR into the 21st century; one such occasion was Cronkite anchoring the second space flight by John Glenn in 1998 as he had Glenn's first in 1962. Cronkite hosted Universe until its cancellation in 1982. In 1983, he reported on the British general election for the ITV current affairs series World In Action, interviewing, among many others, the victorious Prime Minister, Margaret Thatcher. Cronkite hosted the annual Vienna New Year's Concert on PBS from 1985 to 2008, succeeded by Julie Andrews in 2009. For many years, until 2002, he was also the host of the annual Kennedy Center Honors.

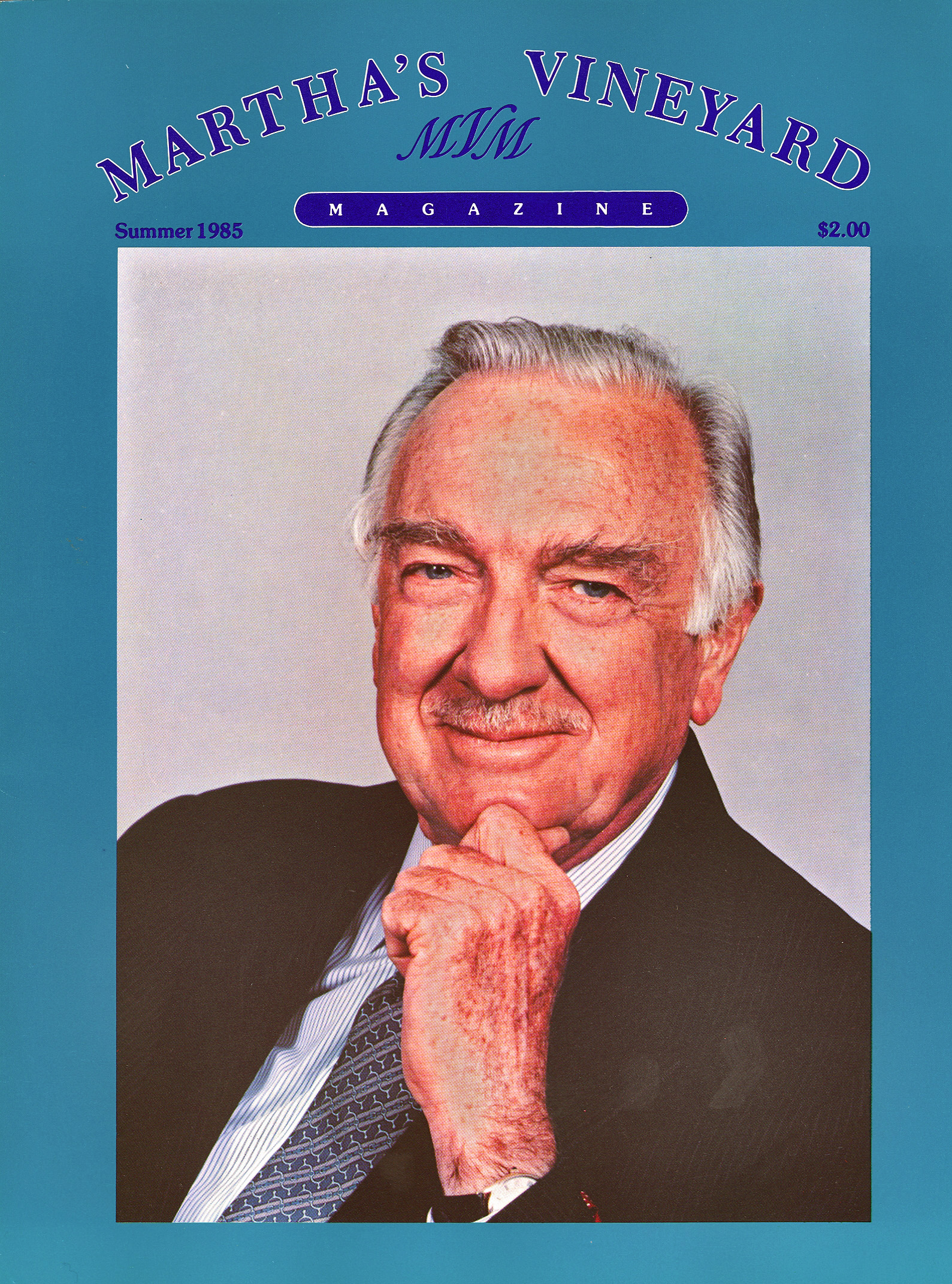
Cronkite wrote an article for the first issue of Martha's Vineyard Magazine.

In 1998, Cronkite hosted the 90-minute documentary, Silicon Valley: A 100 Year Renaissance, produced by the Santa Clara Valley Historical Association. The film documented Silicon Valley's rise from the origin of Stanford University to the current high-technology powerhouse. The documentary was broadcast on PBS throughout the United States and in 26 countries. Prior to 2004, he could also be seen in the opening movie "Back to Neverland" shown in the Walt Disney World attraction The Magic of Disney Animation, interviewing Robin Williams as if he is still on the CBS News channel, ending his on-camera time with Cronkite's famous catchphrase. In the feature, Cronkite describes the steps taken in the creation of an animated film, while Williams becomes an animated character (and even becomes Cronkite, impersonating his voice). He also was shown inviting Disney guests and tourists to the Disney Classics Theater.

On May 21, 1999, Cronkite participated in a panel discussion on "Integrity in the Media" with Ben Bradlee and Mike McCurry at the Connecticut Forum in Hartford, Connecticut. Cronkite provided an anecdote about taking a picture from a house in Houston, Texas, where a newsworthy event occurred and being praised for getting a unique photograph, only to find out later that the city desk had provided him with the wrong address.

=== Voice-overs ===
Cronkite narrated the IMAX film about the Space Shuttle, The Dream is Alive, released in 1985. From May 26, 1986, to August 15, 1994, he was the narrator's voice in the EPCOT Center attraction Spaceship Earth, at Walt Disney World in Orlando, Florida. He provided the pivotal voice of Captain Neweyes in the 1993 animated film We're Back: A Dinosaur's Story, delivering his trademark line at the end. In 1995, he made an appearance on Broadway, providing the voice of the titular book in the 1995 revival of How to Succeed in Business Without Really Trying.

Cronkite was a finalist for NASA's Journalist in Space program, which mirrored the Teacher in Space Project, an opportunity that was suspended after the Challenger disaster in 1986. He recorded voice-overs for the 1995 film Apollo 13, modifying the script he was given to make it more "Cronkitian." In 2002, Cronkite was the voice of Benjamin Franklin in the educational television cartoon Liberty's Kids, which included a news segment ending with the same phrase he did back on the CBS Evening News. This role earned him Daytime Emmy nominations for Outstanding Performer in a Children's Series, in 2003 and 2004, but he did not win. His distinctive voice provided the narration for the television ads of the University of Texas, Austin, his alma mater, with its 'We're Texas' ad campaign.

He held amateur radio operator license KB2GSD and narrated a 2003 American Radio Relay League documentary explaining amateur radio's role in disaster relief. The video tells Amateur Radio's public service story to non-hams, focusing on ham radio's part in helping various agencies respond to wildfires in the Western US during 2002, ham radio in space and the role Amateur Radio plays in emergency communications. "Dozens of radio amateurs helped the police and fire departments and other emergency services maintain communications in New York, Pennsylvania and Washington, DC," narrator Cronkite intoned in reference to ham radio's response to the terrorist attacks on September 11, 2001. Unusually, Cronkite was a Novice-class licensee—the entry level license—for his entire, and long, tenure in the hobby.

On February 15, 2005, he went into the studio at CBS to record narration for WCC Chatham Radio, a documentary about Guglielmo Marconi and his Chatham station, which became the busiest ship-to-shore wireless station in North America from 1914 to 1994. The documentary was directed by Christopher Seufert of Mooncusser Films and premiered at the Chatham Marconi Maritime Center in April 2005. In 2006, Cronkite hosted the World War One Living History Project, a program honoring America's final handful of veterans from the First World War. The program was created by Treehouse Productions and aired on NPR on November 11, 2006. In May 2009, Legacy of War, produced by PBS, was released. Cronkite chronicles, over archive footage, the events following World War II that resulted in America's rise as the dominant world power.

Prior to his death, "Uncle Walter" hosted a number of TV specials and was featured in interviews about the times and events that occurred during his career as America's "most trusted" man. In July 2006, the 90-minute documentary Walter Cronkite: Witness to History aired on PBS. The special was narrated by Katie Couric, who assumed the CBS Evening News anchor chair in September 2006. Cronkite provided the voiceover introduction to Couric's CBS Evening News, which began on September 5, 2006. Cronkite's voiceover was notably not used on introducing the broadcast reporting his funeral – no voiceover was used on this occasion.

=== TV and movie appearances ===
Cronkite made a cameo appearance on a 1974 episode of The Mary Tyler Moore Show, in which he met with Lou Grant in his office. Ted Baxter, who at first tried to convince Cronkite that he (Baxter) was as good a newsman as Eric Sevareid, pleaded with Cronkite to hire him for the network news, at least to give sport scores, and gave an example: "The North Stars 3, the Kings Oh!" Cronkite turned to Grant and said, "I'm gonna get you for this!" Cronkite later said that he was disappointed that his scene was filmed in one take, since he had hoped to sit down and chat with the cast.

In the late 1980s and again in the 1990s, Cronkite appeared on the news-oriented situation comedy Murphy Brown as himself. Both episodes were written by the Emmy Award-winning team of Tom Seeley and Norm Gunzenhauser. He also continued hosting a variety of series. In the early 1980s, he was host of the documentary series World War II with Walter Cronkite. In 1991, he hosted the TV documentary Dinosaur! on A&E (not related to the documentary of the same title hosted by Christopher Reeve on CBS six years earlier), and a 1994 follow-up series, Ape Man: The Story of Human Evolution. In 1995, he narrated the World Liberty Concert held in the Netherlands.

Cronkite routinely hosted the Kennedy Center Honors from 1981 to 2002. He was interviewed for the 1992 documentary Beyond 'JFK': The Question of Conspiracy.

Cronkite appeared briefly in the 2005 dramatic documentary The American Ruling Class, written by Lewis Lapham, and the 2000 film Thirteen Days reporting on the Cuban Missile Crisis. He provided the opening synopsis of the American Space Program leading to the events of Apollo 13 for the 1995 Ron Howard film of the same name.

=== Political activism ===
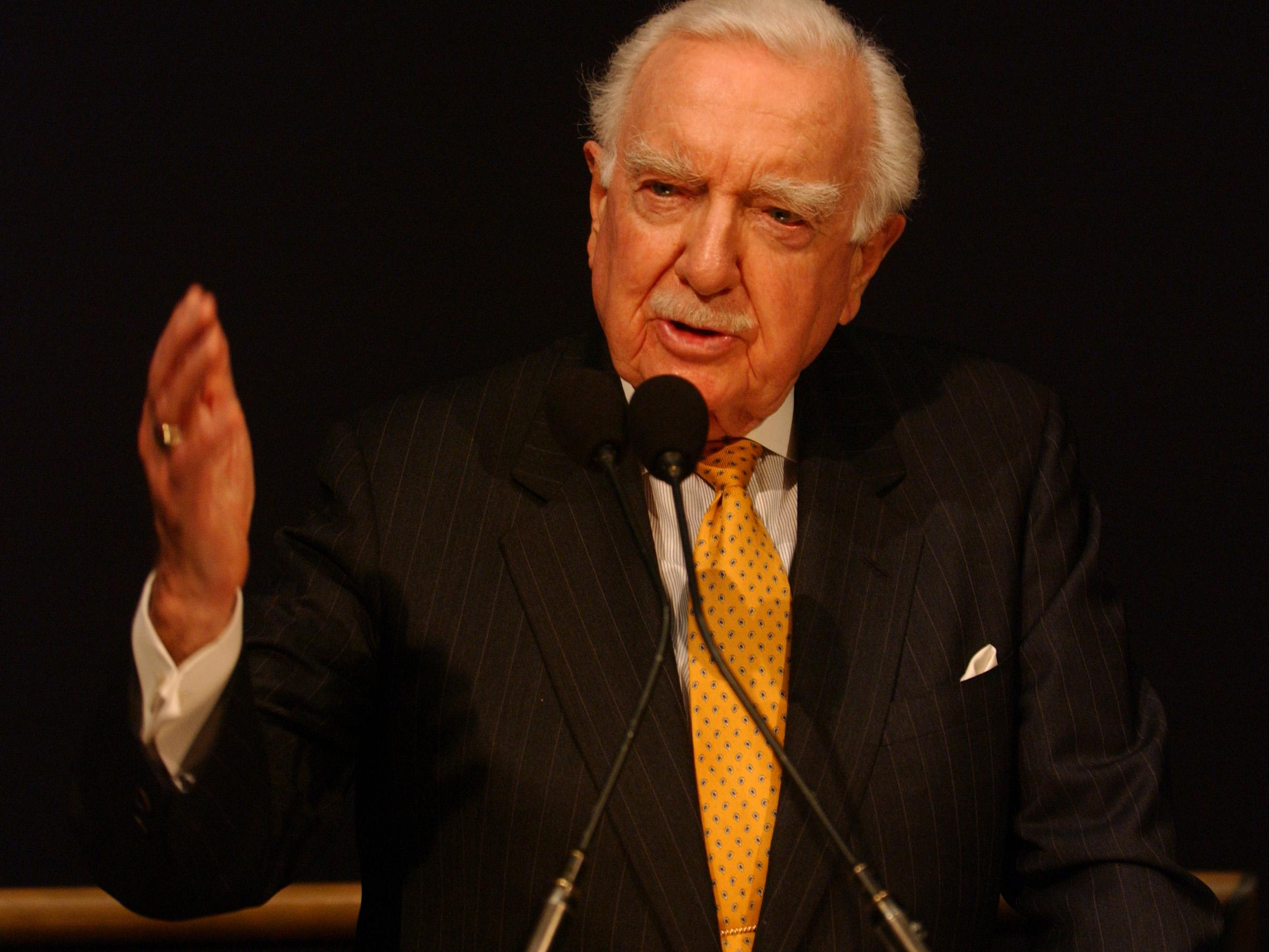
Cronkite speaks at a NASA ceremony in February 2004.

Cronkite wrote a syndicated opinion column for King Features Syndicate. In 2005 and 2006, he contributed to The Huffington Post. Cronkite was the honorary chairman of The Interfaith Alliance. In 2006, he presented the Walter Cronkite Faith and Freedom Award to actor and activist George Clooney on behalf of his organization at its annual dinner in New York.

Cronkite was a vocal advocate for free airtime for political candidates. He worked with the Alliance for Better Campaigns and Common Cause, for instance, on an unsuccessful lobbying effort to have an amendment added to the McCain-Feingold-Shays-Meehan Campaign Finance Reform Act of 2001 that would have required TV broadcast companies to provide free airtime to candidates. Cronkite criticized the present system of campaign finance which allows elections to "be purchased" by special interests, and he noted that all the European democracies "provide their candidates with extensive free airtime." "In fact," Cronkite pointed out, "of all the major nations worldwide that profess to have democracies, only seven – just seven – do not offer free airtime". This put the United States on a list with Ecuador, Honduras, Malaysia, Taiwan, Tanzania, and Trinidad and Tobago. Cronkite concluded that "The failure to give free airtime for our political campaigns endangers our democracy." During the elections held in 2000, the amount spent by candidates in the major TV markets approached $1 billion. "What our campaign asks is that the television industry yield just a tiny percentage of that windfall, less than 1 percent, to fund free airtime."

He was a member of the Constitution Project's bipartisan Liberty and Security Committee. He also supported the nonprofit world hunger organization Heifer International.

In 1998, he supported President Bill Clinton during Clinton's impeachment trial. He was also a proponent of limited world government on the American federalist model, writing fundraising letters for the World Federalist Association (now Citizens for Global Solutions). In accepting the 1999 Norman Cousins Global Governance Award at the ceremony at the United Nations, Cronkite said:

It seems to many of us that if we are to avoid the eventual catastrophic world conflict we must strengthen the United Nations as a first step toward a world government patterned after our own government with a legislature, executive and judiciary, and police to enforce its international laws and keep the peace. To do that, of course, we Americans will have to yield up some of our sovereignty. That would be a bitter pill. It would take a lot of courage, a lot of faith in the new order. But the American colonies did it once and brought forth one of the most nearly perfect unions the world has ever seen.

Cronkite contrasted his support for accountable global government with the opposition to it by politically active Christian fundamentalists in the United States:

Even as with the American rejection of the League of Nations, our failure to live up to our obligations to the United Nations is led by a handful of willful senators who choose to pursue their narrow, selfish political objectives at the cost of our nation's conscience. They pander to and are supported by the Christian Coalition and the rest of the religious right wing. Their leader, Pat Robertson, has written that we should have a world government but only when the messiah arrives. Any attempt to achieve world order before that time must be the work of the Devil! Well join me... I'm glad to sit here at the right hand of Satan.

In 2003, Cronkite, who owned property on Martha's Vineyard, became involved in a long-running debate over his opposition to the construction of a wind farm in that area. In his column, he repeatedly condemned President George W. Bush and the 2003 invasion of Iraq. Cronkite appeared in the 2004 Robert Greenwald film Outfoxed, where he offered commentary on what he said were unethical and overtly political practices at the Fox News channel. Cronkite remarked that when Fox News was founded by Rupert Murdoch, "it was intended to be a conservative organization – beyond that; a far-right-wing organization". In January 2006, during a press conference to promote the PBS documentary about his career, Cronkite said that he felt the same way about America's presence in Iraq as he had about their presence in Vietnam in 1968 and that he felt America should recall its troops.

Cronkite spoke out against the war on drugs in support of the Drug Policy Alliance, writing a fundraising letter and appearing in advertisements on behalf of the DPA. In the letter, Cronkite wrote: "Today, our nation is fighting two wars: one abroad and one at home. While the war in Iraq is in the headlines, the other war is still being fought on our own streets. Its casualties are the wasted lives of our own citizens. I am speaking of the war on drugs. And I cannot help but wonder how many more lives, and how much more money, will be wasted before another Robert McNamara admits what is plain for all to see: the war on drugs is a failure."

== Personal life ==
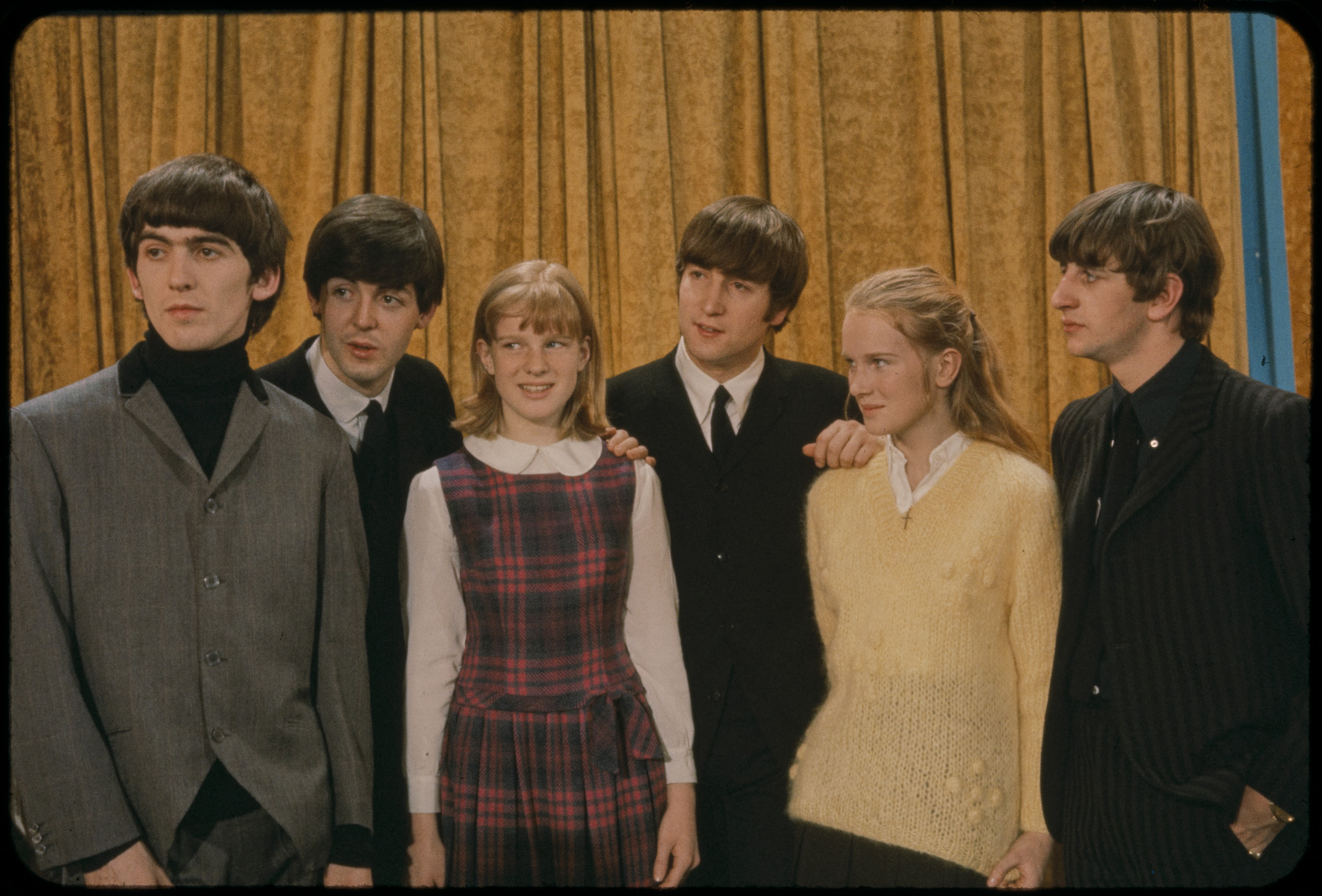
Cronkite's daughters Nancy and Kathy with the Beatles, February 8, 1964

Cronkite was married for nearly 65 years to Mary Elizabeth 'Betsy' Maxwell Cronkite, from March 30, 1940, until her death from cancer on March 15, 2005. They had three children: Nancy Cronkite, Mary Kathleen "Kathy" Cronkite, and Walter Leland (Chip) Cronkite III (who is married to actress Deborah Rush). Cronkite dated singer Joanna Simon from 2005 to 2009. A grandson, Walter Cronkite IV, worked at CBS and currently serves as director of communications at the Structured Finance Association. Cronkite's cousin is former Mayor of Kansas City and 2008 Democratic nominee for Missouri's 6th congressional district Kay Barnes.

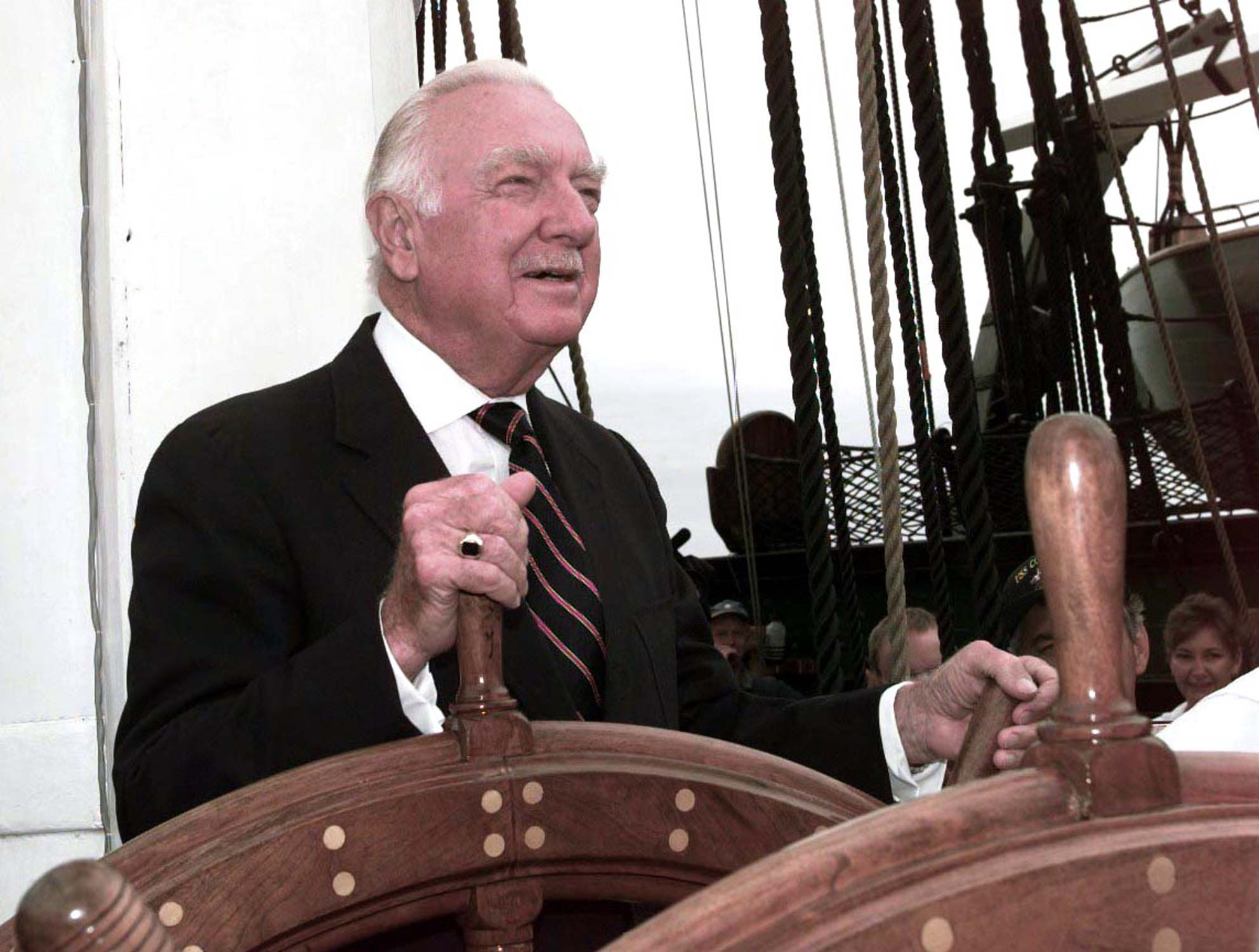
Cronkite helmed the USS Constitution in July 1997.

Cronkite was an accomplished sailor and enjoyed sailing coastal waters of the United States in his custom-built 48-foot Sunward Wyntje. Cronkite was a member of the United States Coast Guard Auxiliary, with the honorary rank of commodore. Throughout the 1950s, he was an aspiring sports car racer and participated in the 1959 12 Hours of Sebring.

Cronkite was an Episcopalian. He briefly considered entering the ministry before deciding to embark on a career in journalism.

Cronkite was reported to be a fan of the game Diplomacy, which was rumored to be Henry Kissinger's favorite game.

== Death ==
External videos
- Memorial service for Walter Cronkite, September 9, 2009, C-SPAN

In June 2009, Cronkite was reported to be terminally ill. He died on July 17, 2009, at his home in New York City aged 92. He is believed to have died from cerebrovascular disease.

Cronkite's funeral took place on July 23, 2009, at St. Bartholomew's Church in midtown Manhattan, New York City. Among many journalists who attended were Tom Brokaw, Connie Chung, Katie Couric, Charles Gibson, Dan Rather, Andy Rooney, Morley Safer, Diane Sawyer, Bob Schieffer, Meredith Vieira, and Barbara Walters. At his funeral, his friends noted his love of music, including, recently, drumming. He was cremated and his remains buried next to those of his wife, Betsy, in the family plot in Kansas City.

A memorial service for Cronkite was held at Lincoln Center in New York City on September 9, 2009. Presidents Barack Obama and Bill Clinton eulogized him, as did CBS presidents Les Moonves and Howard Stringer, Nick Clooney, Tom Brokaw, Katie Couric, Buzz Aldrin, and Bob Schieffer, among others. Obama said Cronkite "was a voice of certainty in a world that was growing more and more uncertain. And through it all, he never lost the integrity or the plainspoken speaking style that he gained growing up in the heartland."

== Legacy ==
=== Public credibility and trustworthiness ===
For many years, until a decade after he left his post as anchor, Cronkite was considered one of the most trusted figures in the United States. For most of his 19 years as anchor, he was the "predominant news voice in America". Affectionately known as "Uncle Walter", he covered many of the important news events of the era so effectively that his image and voice are closely associated with the Cuban Missile Crisis, the assassination of President John F. Kennedy, the Vietnam War, the Apollo 11 Moon landing, and the Watergate scandal. USA Today wrote that "few TV figures have ever had as much power as Cronkite did at his height." Enjoying the cult of personality surrounding Cronkite in those years, CBS allowed some good-natured fun-poking at its star anchorman in some episodes of the network's popular situation comedy All in the Family, during which the lead character Archie Bunker would sometimes complain about the newsman, calling him "Pinko Cronkite."

Cronkite trained himself to speak at a rate of 124 words per minute in his newscasts so that viewers could clearly understand him. In contrast, Americans average about 165 words per minute, and fast, difficult-to-understand talkers speak close to 200 words per minute.

=== Awards and honors ===
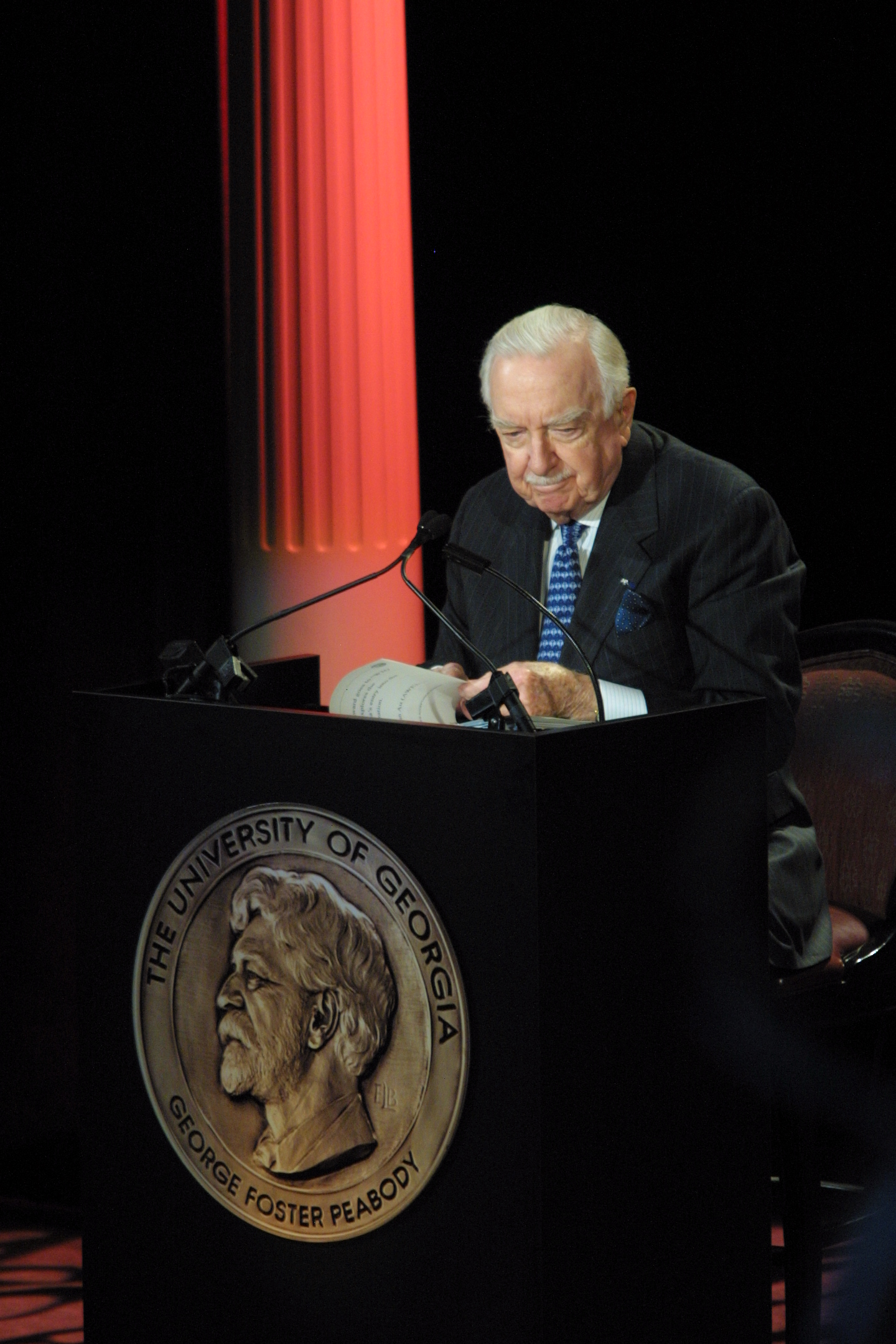
Cronkite hosted the 61st Annual Peabody Awards Luncheon in May 2002.

In 1968, the faculty of the E. W. Scripps School of Journalism at Ohio University voted to award Cronkite the Carr Van Anda Award "for enduring contributions to journalism." In 1970, Cronkite received a "Freedom of the Press" George Polk Award and the Paul White Award from the Radio Television Digital News Association.

In 1972, in recognition of his career, Princeton University's American Whig-Cliosophic Society awarded Cronkite the James Madison Award for Distinguished Public Service.

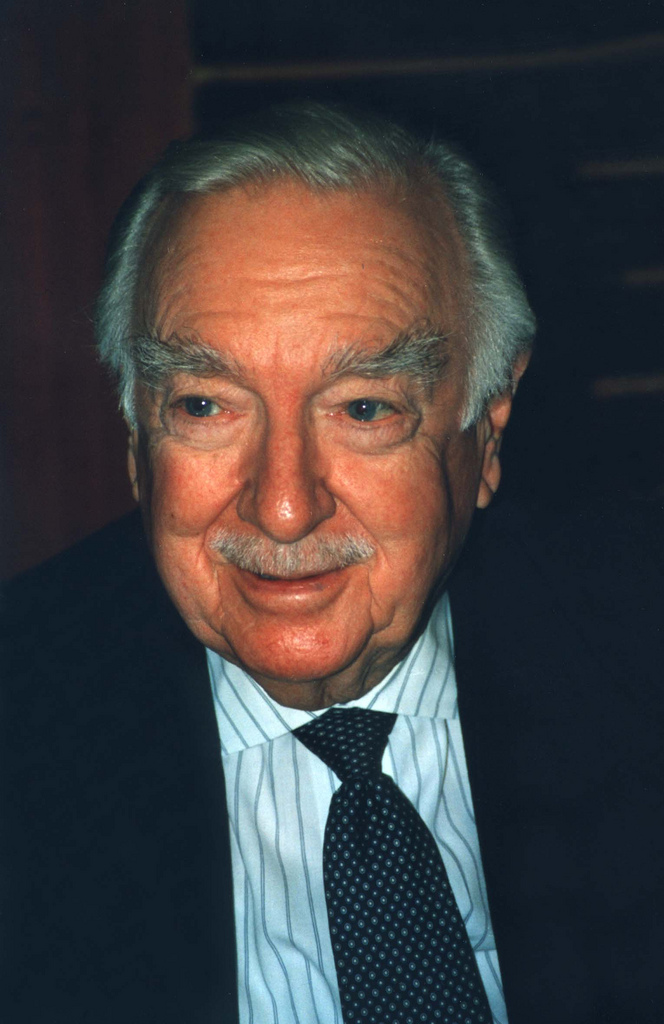
Cronkite in 1996

In 1977, Cronkite was elected to membership in the American Antiquarian Society, for which he was a proactive supporter and member, even participating in educational video materials for the society's 175th anniversary. In 1981, the year he retired, former president Jimmy Carter awarded Cronkite the Presidential Medal of Freedom. In that year, he also received the S. Roger Horchow Award for Greatest Public Service by a Private Citizen, an award given out annually by Jefferson Awards, and the Paul White Award for lifetime achievement from the Radio Television Digital News Association. In 1985, Cronkite was honored with the induction into the Academy of Television Arts and Sciences Hall of Fame. In 1989 he received the Four Freedoms Award for the Freedom of Speech. He was elected to the American Philosophical Society in 1994. In 1995, he received the Ischia International Journalism Award. In 1999, Cronkite received the Rotary National Award for Space Achievement's Corona Award in recognition of a lifetime of achievement in space exploration. He was elected a Fellow of the American Academy of Arts and Sciences in 2003. On March 1, 2006, Cronkite became the first non-astronaut to receive NASA's Ambassador of Exploration Award. Among Cronkite's numerous awards were four Peabody awards for excellence in broadcasting.

In 2003, Cronkite was honored by the Vienna Philharmonic with the Franz Schalk Gold Medal, in view of his contributions to the New Year's Concert and the cultural image of Austria.

Minor planet 6318 Cronkite, discovered in 1990 by Eleanor Helin, is named in his honor.

There is a street named after Cronkite in San Antonio, Texas.

=== Cronkite School at Arizona State University ===
A few years after Cronkite retired, Tom Chauncey, a former owner of KOOL-TV, the then-CBS affiliate in Phoenix, contacted Cronkite, an old friend, and asked him if he would be willing to have the journalism school at Arizona State University named after him. Cronkite immediately agreed. The ASU program acquired status and respect from its namesake.

Cronkite took the time to interact with the students and staff of the Walter Cronkite School of Journalism and Mass Communication. He made the trip to Arizona annually to present the Walter Cronkite Award for Excellence in Journalism to a leader in the field of media.

"The values that Mr. Cronkite embodies – excellence, integrity, accuracy, fairness, objectivity – we try to instill in our students each and every day. There is no better role model for our faculty or our students," said Dean Christopher Callahan.

The school, with approximately 1,700 students, is widely regarded as one of the top journalism schools in the country. It is housed in a new facility in downtown Phoenix that is equipped with 14 digital newsrooms and computer labs, two TV studios, 280 digital student workstations, the Cronkite Theater, the First Amendment Forum, and new technology. The school's students regularly finish at the top of national collegiate journalism competitions, such as the Hearst Journalism Awards program and the Society of Professional Journalists Mark of Excellence Awards. In 2009, students won the Robert F. Kennedy Journalism Award for college print reporting.

In 2008, the state-of-the-art journalism education complex in the heart of ASU's Downtown Phoenix campus was also built in his honor. The Walter Cronkite Regents Chair in Communication seats the Texas College of Communications dean.

=== Walter Cronkite Papers ===
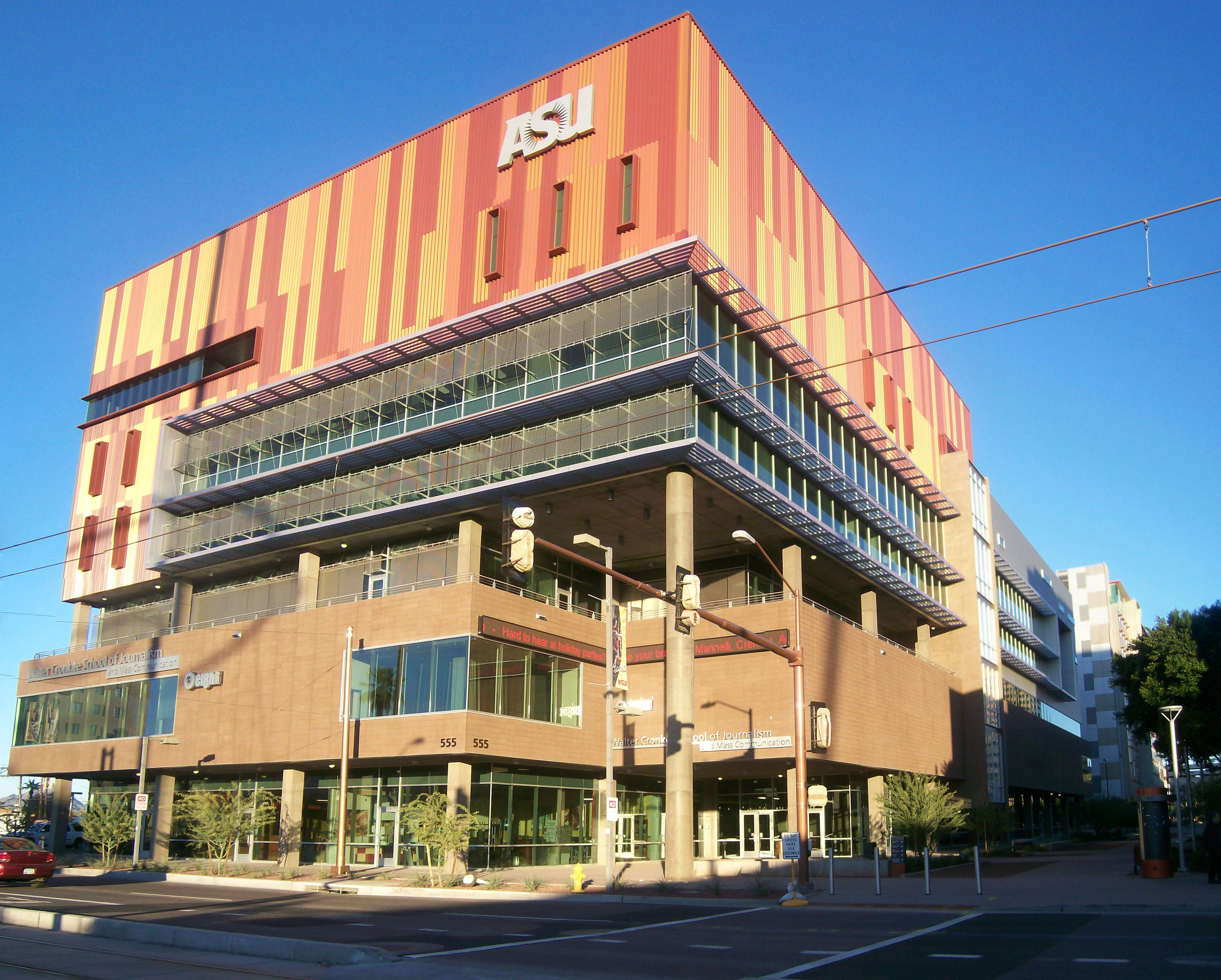
The Walter Cronkite School of Journalism and Mass Communication is at Arizona State University in Phoenix.

The Walter Cronkite papers are preserved at the curatorial Dolph Briscoe Center for American History at the University of Texas at Austin. Occupying 293 linear feet (almost 90 metres) of shelf space, the papers document Cronkite's journalism career. Amongst the collected material are Cronkite's early beginnings while he still lived in Houston. They encompass his coverage of World War II as a United Press International correspondent, where he cemented his reputation by taking on hazardous overseas assignments. During this time he also covered the Nuremberg war crimes trial serving as the chief of the United Press bureau in Moscow. The main content of the papers documents Cronkite's career with CBS News between 1950 and 1981.

The Cronkite Papers include a variety of interviews with U.S. presidents, including Herbert Hoover, Harry Truman, and Ronald Reagan.

External videos
- Booknotes interview with Cronkite on A Reporter's Life, June 29, 1997, C-SPAN

Cronkite was helped in compiling the materials for his autobiography by Don Carleton, executive director for the Center for American History in the early 1990s, which was published as A Reporter's Life in 1996. Materials from the archive would later be integral to the television adaptation Cronkite Remembers, which was shown on the Discovery Channel.

NASA presented Cronkite with a Moon rock sample from the early Apollo expeditions spanning 1969 to 1972. Cronkite passed on the Moon rock to Bill Powers, president of the University of Texas at Austin, and it became part of the collection at the Dolph Briscoe Center for American History. Carleton said at this occasion, "We are deeply honored by Walter Cronkite's decision to entrust this prestigious award to the Center for American History. The Center already serves as the proud steward of his professional and personal papers, which include his coverage of the space program for CBS News. It is especially fitting that the archive documenting Walter's distinguished career should also include one of the moon rocks that the heroic astronauts of the Apollo program brought to Earth."

=== Memorial at Missouri Western State University ===
On November 4, 2013, Missouri Western State University in St. Joseph, Missouri, dedicated the Walter Cronkite Memorial. The nearly 6,000 square-foot memorial includes images, videos and memorabilia from Cronkite's life and the many events he covered as a journalist. The memorial includes a replica of the newsroom from which Cronkite broadcast the news during the 1960s and 1970s. In 2014, the Memorial received the Missouri Division of Tourism's Spotlight Award.

== Books ==
- Cronkite, Walter (1971). The Challenges of Change. Washington: Public Affairs Press. LCCN 71-149494.
- ——————— (1971). Eye on the World. New York: Cowles Book Co. ISBN 0402120884.
- ——————— (1996). A Reporter's Life. New York: Alfred A. Knopf. ISBN 0-394-57879-1.

== See also ==
- New Yorkers in journalism
- Walter Cronkite School of Journalism and Mass Communication

Media offices
Preceded by Douglas Edwards	CBS Evening News anchor April 16, 1962 – March 6, 1981	Succeeded by Dan Rather
Preceded by None	American television prime time anchor, Winter Olympic Games; 1960	Succeeded by Jim McKay
