= Kathy Cronkite =

American actress (born 1950)

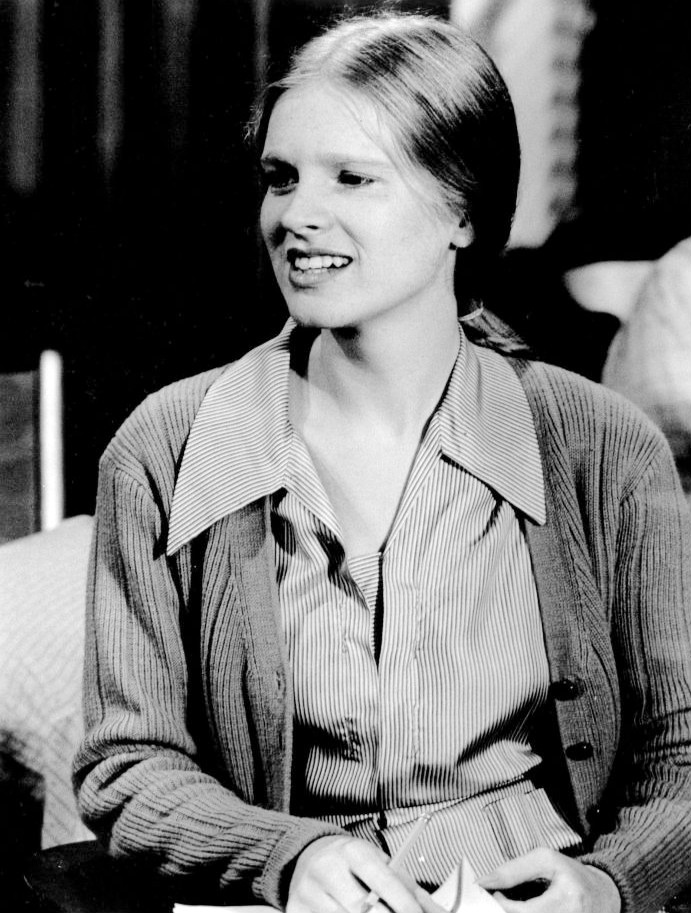
- Cronkite's acting debut on The Waltons, 1975.
- Born: September 5, 1950 (age 75)
- Occupations: Mental health advocate, actress
- Years active: 1974–current
- Spouse: William F. Ikard (div.)
- Children: 2
- Father: Walter Cronkite

Kathy Cronkite (born September 5, 1950) is an American actress and mental health professional. She is the daughter of the late CBS News anchorman Walter Cronkite.

Cronkite is a public speaker on issues related to mental health, especially depression. She is the author of the books On the Edge of Darkness: Conversations on Conquering Depression and On the Edge of the Spotlight: Celebrities' Children Speak Out About Their Lives.

In 1979, she co-starred on the short-lived NBC sitcom Hizzonner.

She also had roles in the movies Network, Billy Jack, The Trial of Billy Jack, Billy Jack Goes to Washington and Which Way Is Up.

Cronkite was previously married to William F. Ikard. They have two children. She lives in Austin, Texas.

== Filmography ==
Year	Title	Role	Notes
1974	The Trial of Billy Jack	Kristen	
1975	Corner of the Circle		
1976	Network	Mary Ann Gifford	
1977	Billy Jack Goes to Washington		
1977	Which Way Is Up	Photographer	
