= Christopher Seufert =

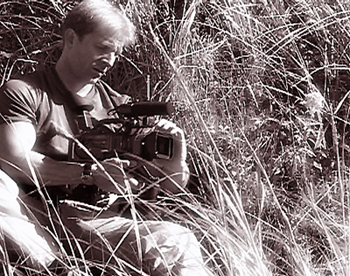
Christopher Seufert

Christopher Seufert (born 1967) is a documentary film producer and director, and photographer based in Chatham, Massachusetts. His production company is Mooncusser Films.

His film work has appeared on HBO, VH-1, the Discovery Channel, the History Channel, PBS, and Twin Cities Public Television. Additional works include direct cinema documentaries with alternative-folk musician Suzanne Vega, the late writer/illustrator Edward Gorey, Depeche Mode musician Vince Clarke, journalist Walter Cronkite, and filmmaker Albert Maysles. He also directed music videos for David Ryan of The Lemonheads and musician Chris Trapper of The Push Stars.

His photography is published in 6 hard-cover photography books including The Cape Cod National Seashore: A Photographic Adventure and Guide (Schiffer, 2012), and Cape Cod & the Islands Reflections (Schiffer, 2010).

Seufert received his BA in English from Trinity College and his MA in Anthropology from California State University, East Bay. According to interviews with NewEnglandFilm.com and the Boston Globe, his academic background was as a journalist and archaeologist and he split his time among these disciplines until the mid-90s when he dedicated himself full-time to documentary production.

Seufert directed actress Julie Harris as voice talent in five documentary projects and directed CBS journalist Walter Cronkite in a 2005 documentary about the early wireless stations of radio pioneer Guglielmo Marconi. As Cronkite's last project it was winner of the Massachusetts Cultural Council Gold Star Award.

He has created original natural environment recordings through the use of binaural recording techniques with the Neumann KU-100 head microphone. He has also produced an international world soundscapes series and a 100-part series of Cape Cod recordings.
