= A Reporter's Life =

1997 memoir by Walter Cronkite

- Author: Walter Cronkite
- Language: English
- Genre: Memoir
- Published: 1997
- Publisher: Ballantine Books
- Publication place: United States
- Pages: 384

A Reporter's Life by Walter Cronkite was published by Ballantine Books on October 28, 1997. The 384-page memoir chronicles Cronkite's decades of reporting, focusing on his experiences with D-Day, the Civil Rights Movement, the John Kennedy assassination, NASA's first crewed Moon landing and Moon walk, freedom movements in South Africa and much more. It includes personal accounts of his interactions with presidents from Franklin D. Roosevelt to Richard Nixon.

== Media coverage of the book ==
As the New York Times book review said, "It's the story of a modest man who succeeded extravagantly by remaining mostly himself -- succeeded in a demanding new medium, itself part of an exploding technology that made the world more complex by enabling peoples to know more about one another. And not unlike journalism itself, his memoir is a short course on the flow of events in the second half of this century -- events the world knows more about because of Walter Cronkite's work, and some of which might not have happened without it."

Publishers Weekly said that "Written with wry, self-deprecating humor, Cronkite's memoir gives us the veteran TV newscaster at his most relaxed and ingratiating as he recounts dozens of his scoops."

The LA Times recounts, "Cronkite is entitled to boast--especially in a book that is less surprising for its hubris than for the bitterness with which it ends. After almost 400 pages of great stories, unforgettable characters and impressive journalistic achievements at CBS, Cronkite complains that ultimately he was 'driven from the temple where for 19 years . . . I had worshiped the great god News'."

Ashbel Green was the editor.
