= Not for Ourselves Alone =

- Written by: Geoffrey Ward
- Directed by: Ken Burns
- Narrated by: Sally Kellerman

Production
- Producers: Paul Barnes; Ken Burns
- Cinematography: Buddy Squires; Allen Moore; Ken Burns
- Editor: Sarah E. Hill
- Running time: 210 minutes
- Production companies: Florentine Films; WETA

Original release
- Network: WETA
- Release: November 7 – November 8, 1999

Not for Ourselves Alone: The Story of Elizabeth Cady Stanton & Susan B. Anthony is a 1999 American documentary film by Ken Burns produced for National Public Radio and WETA. The documentary explores the movement for women's suffrage in the United States in the 19th century, focusing on leaders Elizabeth Cady Stanton and Susan B. Anthony. It won a Peabody Award in 1999. It was released on VHS on November 9, 1999.

== Events covered in the documentary ==
- The revolution
- "I wish you were a boy" The status of women in the mid-1850s
- A drudge or a doll
- Connections to the abolitionist movement
- Temperance and reform
- Mental Hunger - the restrictions leading to activism
- The Seneca Falls Convention on women's rights
- "A caged lion" - Susan B. Anthony
- Women's Souls
- The Woman's National Loyal League and the American Civil War
- The 15th amendment and women's rights
- The Revolution (newspaper)
- Done It! Women's rights before the courts
- Spreading the Word
- Making History
- Division and unity - the American Woman Suffrage Association and the NWSA merge
- Self Sovereignty - a philosophy of freedom
- The Woman's Bible - a challenge to religion
- Anthony's death
- The franchise comes
