= Female state legislators in the United States =

Percentage of state legislature that is female.

Women have served in state legislatures in the United States since 1895. Their ranks have increased with the advent of nationwide women's suffrage after 1920. Although the number of women serving in state legislatures has more than quintupled since 1971, they remain underrepresented. In 2023, women held less than half of the seats in state legislatures across the majority of states. Specifically, seven states —Oklahoma (19.2%), Louisiana (19.4%), Alabama (17.4%), South Carolina (14.8%), Mississippi (14.5%), Tennessee (14.4%), and West Virginia (11.9%)— had legislatures where women occupied less than 20% of the seats.

== Table. US states and Washington, DC. 2023 ==
- Rank is by overall percent. D.C. is not ranked. Duplicate ranks if same overall percent.
- D is Democrat. R is Republican. Ind is Independent. NP is non-partisan.
- Location links are for "Politics of LOCATION" or "Government of LOCATION" links.

Women in state legislatures in 2023. Party affiliations. Female/male ratios by branch. Overall ratio and percent.
Location	Rank	Senate	Senate ratio	House	House ratio	Overall ratio	Overall percent
Alabama	46	3D, 1R	4/35	10D, 10R	20/105	24/140	17.1
Alaska	25	2D, 3R	5/20	7D, 6R, 2Ind	15/40	20/60	33.3
Arizona	2	11D, 5R	16/30	20D, 9R	29/60	45/90	50.0
Arkansas	43	2D, 3R	5/35	10D, 16R	26/100	31/135	23.0
California	11	15D, 3R	18/40	27D, 5R	32/80	50/120	41.7
Colorado	3	11D, 2R	13/35	30D, 5R	35/65	48/100	48.0
Connecticut	16	10D, 2R	12/36	39D, 19R	58/151	70/187	37.4
Delaware	20	8D, 0R	8/21	14D, 0R	14/41	22/62	35.5
Florida	12	7D, 9R	16/40	25D, 15R	50/120	66/160	41.3
Georgia	21	14D, 2R	16/56	46D, 19R	65/180	81/236	34.3
Hawaii	18	8D, 0R	8/25	18D, 2R	20/51	28/76	36.8
Idaho	30	4D, 7R	11/35	5D, 16R	21/70	32/105	30.5
Illinois	10	20D, 5R	25/59	43D, 6R	49/118	74/177	41.8
Indiana	38	3D, 7R	10/50	15D, 16R	31/100	41/150	27.3
Iowa	35	8D, 7R	15/50	16D, 13R	29/100	44/150	29.3
Kansas	32	7D, 10R	17/40	17D, 16R	33/125	50/165	30.3
Kentucky	31	4D, 5R	9/38	15D, 18R	33/100	42/138	30.4
Louisiana	42	2D, 3R	5/39	11D, 18R	29/105	34/144	23.6
Maine	7	11D, 3R	14/35	48D, 19R	67/151	81/186	43.5
Maryland	9	14D, 1R	15/47	57D, 7R	64/141	79/188	42.0
Massachusetts	29	11D, 0R	11/40	46D, 4R, 1Ind	51/160	62/200	31.0
Michigan	14	12D, 3R	15/38	31D, 12R	43/110	58/148	39.2
Minnesota	17	19D, 3R	22/67	36D, 17R	53/134	75/201	37.3
Mississippi	47	2D, 7R	9/52	7D, 9R, 2Ind	18/122	27/174	15.5
Missouri	36	5D, 7R	12/34	28D, 17R	45/163	57/197	28.9
Montana	26	10D, 4R	14/50	15D, 19R	34/100	48/150	32.0
Nebraska	19	18NP	18/49	n/a	unicameral	18/49	36.7
Nevada	1	9D, 4R	13/21	20D, 5R	25/42	38/63	60.3
New Hampshire	15	7D, 5R	12/24	101D, 49R	150/400	162/424	38.2
New Jersey	24	8D, 2R	10/40	25D, 6R	31/80	41/120	34.2
New Mexico	6	10D, 1R	11/42	31D, 7R	38/70	49/112	43.8
New York	21	17D, 3R	20/63	50D, 3R	53/150	73/213	34.3
North Carolina	34	13D, 4R	17/50	24D, 9R	33/120	50/170	29.4
North Dakota	41	1D, 7R	8/47	9D, 18R	27/94	35/141	24.8
Ohio	37	3D, 5R	8/33	13D, 17R	30/99	38/132	28.8
Oklahoma	45	5D, 5R	10/48	10D, 9R	19/101	29/149	19.5
Oregon	13	7D, 2R	9/30	18D, 10R	28/60	37/90	41.1
Pennsylvania	26	8D, 9R	17/50	37D, 27R	64/203	81/253	32.0
Rhode Island	8	14D, 2R	16/38	30D, 3R	33/75	49/113	43.4
South Carolina	49	1D, 3R, 1Ind	5/46	8D, 12R	20/124	25/170	14.7
South Dakota	39	2D, 5R	7/35	4D, 17R	21/70	28/105	26.7
Tennessee	48	5D, 3R	8/33	3D, 9R	12/99	20/132	15.2
Texas	33	4D, 4R	8/31	32D, 14R	46/150	54/181	29.8
Utah	40	5D, 2R	7/29	8D, 12R	20/75	27/104	26.0
Vermont	5	12D, 0R	12/30	58D, 9R, 2Ind	69/150	81/180	45.0
Virginia	21	11D, 3R	14/40	27D, 7R	34/100	48/140	34.3
Washington	4	15D, 5R	20/49	35D, 12R	47/98	67/147	45.6
Washington, D.C.	N/A	4D, 1Ind	5/13	n/a	unicameral	5/13	38.5
West Virginia	50	0D, 4R	4/34	2D, 11R	13/100	17/134	12.7
Wisconsin	28	5D, 3R	8/33	20D, 13R	33/99	41/132	31.1
Wyoming	44	0D, 7R	7/31	3D, 10R	13/62	20/93	21.5

== Table. US territories. 2023 ==
Note: 24 female legislators overall in Puerto Rico. Affiliations: 8 PNP, 11 PPD, 5 Third Party.

US territorial legislatures in 2023. Party affiliations. Female/male ratios by branch. Overall ratio and percent.
Location	Rank	Senate	Senate ratio	House	House ratio	Overall ratio	Overall percent
American Samoa	5	1Ind	1/18	1	1/21	2/39	5.1
Guam	1	4D, 2R	6/15	n/a	unicameral	6/15	40.0
Northern Mariana Islands	4	2D, 1Ind	3/9	1D, 2I	3/20	6/29	20.7
Puerto Rico	3	13Ind	13/27	n/a	11Ind	24/78	30.8
U.S. Virgin Islands	2	4D, 1Ind	5/16	n/a	unicameral	5/16	31.3

== History ==
The first women to serve in any state legislature were Clara Cressingham, Carrie C. Holly and Frances S. Klock, who were all elected in 1894 to the Colorado State House of Representatives. All three were elected the year after women in Colorado obtained the right to vote through popular election in 1893. As Secretary of the House Republican Caucus, Cressingham was the first woman to fill a leadership position in an American legislature. In 1896, Martha Hughes Cannon became the first woman elected to an upper body of a state legislature when she defeated her own husband, Angus M. Cannon, for a seat in the Utah State Senate.

The 50th state to see the debut of female state legislators in their lower house was Hawaii in 1959, who elected Dorothy Devereux and Eureka Forbes to their House of Representatives upon admittance to statehood. Alabama's Senate was the 50th upper house to welcome women when Ann Bedsole and Frances Strong joined the Senate in 1983.

In 2016, the highest shares of female members of a state legislature - at least 35% per state legislature - were in Colorado (30/65 in the House, 12/35 in the Senate), Vermont (65/150 in the House, 9/30 in the Senate), and Arizona (19/60 in the House, 13/30 in the Senate). The shares in Colorado and Vermont decreased to below 40% in 2017, while Arizona, Illinois, Nevada and Washington all saw their numbers increase up to between 35% and 39%. Altogether in 2017, women constitute 24.8% of all state legislators in the United States, a ratio that has increased by less than 4 percentage points since 1994.

Only four chambers have reached a near or absolute majority of women:

- New Hampshire Senate (2009-2010, 13/24 women)
- Nevada Assembly (2019, 23/42 women)
- Colorado House of Representatives(2019, 32/65 women)
- Oregon House of Representatives (2020, 30/60 women)

== List of first women to serve in state and territorial legislatures ==
List of first women to serve in state and territorial legislatures
Location	Year	House	Year	Senate
Alabama	1923	Hattie Hooker Wilkins	1983	Ann Bedsole; Frances Strong
Alaska (state)	1959	Helen Fischer; Dora Sweeney	1959	Irene Ryan
Alaska (territory)	1937	Nell Scott	1949	Anita Garnick
Arizona	1915	Rachel Emma Berry	1915	Frances Willard Munds
Arkansas	1922	Frances Hunt	1964	Dorathy Allen
California	1919	Esto Broughton; Grace S. Dorris; Elizabeth Hughes; Anna Saylor	1977	Rose Ann Vuich
Colorado	1895	Clara Cressingham; Carrie Clyde Holly; Frances Klock	1913	Helen Robinson
Connecticut	1921	Emily Sophie Brown; Rev. Grace Edwards; Lillian Frink; Mary Hooker; Helen Jewett	1925	Alice Merritt
Delaware	1925	Florence Hanby	1947	Vera Gilbride Davis
Florida	1929	Edna Giles Fuller	1963	Beth Johnson
Georgia	1923	Bessie Kempton; Viola Ross Napier	1925	Margaret Johnson
Hawaii (state)	1959	Dorothy L. Devereux; Eureka Forbes	1963	Patsy Mink
Hawaii (territory)	1925	Rosalie Keliʻinoi	1933	Elsie Hart Wilcox
Idaho	1898	Clara Campbell; Hattie Noble; Mary Allen Wright	1935	Margaret Bogard Pike
Illinois	1923	Lottie Holman O’Neill	1925	Florence Fifer Bohrer
Indiana	1921	Julia D. Nelson	1943	Arcada Balz
Iowa	1929	Carolyn Campbell Pendray	1933	Carolyn Campbell Pendray
Kansas	1919	Minnie J. Grinstead	1929	Patricia Solander
Kentucky	1922	Mary Elliott Flanery	1950	Carolyn Moore
Louisiana	1940	Doris Lindsey Holland; Beatrice Hawthorne Moore	1936	Doris Lindsey Holland
Maine	1923	Dora Pinkham	1927	Katharine Allen; Claire Carter; Dora Pinkham
Maryland	1922	Mary Risteau	1935	Mary Risteau
Massachusetts	1923	Sylvia Donaldson; Susan Fitzgerald	1937	Sybil Holmes
Michigan	1925	Cora Reynolds Anderson	1921	Eva McCall Hamilton
Minnesota	1923	Myrtle Cain; Sue Metzger Dickey Hough; Hannah Jensen Kempfer; Mabeth Hurd Paige	1927	Laura Emelia Naplin
Mississippi	1924	Nellie Nugent Somerville	1924	Carrie Belle Kearney
Missouri	1923	Mellcene Smith; Sarah Lucille Turner	1973	Mary Gant
Montana	1917	Maggie Smith Hathaway; Emma Ingalls	1945	Ellenore Bridenstine
Nebraska	1925*	Mabel Gillespie; Clara Humphrey; Sarah Muir	1946	Nell Krause
Nevada	1919	Sadie Hurst	1935	Frances Friedhoff
New Hampshire	1921	Jessie Doe; Dr. Mary L. R. Farnum	1931	E. Maude Ferguson
New Jersey	1921	Margaret Laird; Jennie Van Ness	1966	Mildred Barry Hughes
New Mexico	1923	Bertha M. Paxton	1925	Louise Holland Coe
New York	1919	Mary Lilly; Ida Sammis	1935	Rhoda Fox Graves
North Carolina	1921	Lillian Clement	1931	Gertrude Dills McKee
North Dakota	1923	Minnie Craig; Nellie Doughterty	1951	Agnes Kjorlie Geelan
Ohio	1923	Nettie Clapp; Lulu Gleason; Adelaide Ott; May Van Wye	1923	Nettie Loughead; Maude Waitt
Oklahoma	1921	Bessie S. McColgin	1921	Lamar Looney
Oregon	1915	Marian Towne	1915	Kathryn Clarke
Pennsylvania	1923	Alice Bentley; Rosa DeYoung; Sarah McCune Gallaher; Helen Grimes; Sarah Gertrude MacKinney; Lillie Pitts; Martha Speiser; Martha Thomas	1925	Flora M. Vare
Rhode Island	1923	Isabelle Ahearn O'Neill	1929	Lulu Mowry Schlesinger
South Carolina	1945	Harriet Johnson	1929	Mary Gordon Ellis
South Dakota	1923	Gladys Pyle	1937	Jessie Sanders
Tennessee	1923	Marian Scudder Griffin	1921	Anna Lee Worley
Texas	1923	Edith Wilmans	1927	Margie Neal
Utah	1897	Sarah E. Anderson; Eurithe LaBarthe	1896	Martha Hughes Cannon
Vermont	1921	Edna Beard	1923	Edna Beard
Virginia	1924	Sarah Lee Fain; Helen Henderson	1980	Eva Mae Scott
Washington	1913	Frances Axtell; Nena Jolidon Croake	1923	Reba Hurn
West Virginia	1923	Anna Johnson Gates	1934	Hazel Edna Hyre
Wisconsin	1925	Mildred Barber; Hellen Brooks; Helen Thompson	1975	Kathryn Morrison
Wyoming	1911	Mary Bellamy	1931	Dora McGrath
Territories
American Samoa	1953	Zilpher Jennings; Mabel Reid		
Guam	1955	Cynthia Torres; Lagrimas Untalan	–	Unicameral
Puerto Rico	1933	María Luisa Arcelay De La Rosa	1937	María Martinez De Pérez Almiroty
U.S. Virgin Islands	1953	Ann Christian Abramson	–	Unicameral

== State Legislative Leadership ==
Leadership positions at the state legislatures include senate presidents, presidents pro tempore, house speakers, majority and minority leaders of the senate and house. In 2023, women held leadership positions in 35 state senates and in 32 state houses, which corresponds to 26% of 350 positions. 44 women (34D, 10R) serve in these leadership roles at State Senates and 47 (36D, 11R) serve at the State Houses. Nine states (AL, IN, KY, MS, NE, SC, SD, TX, WY) have no women in leadership positions.

=== Current Women Speakers of State Houses ===
There are 10 (9D, 1R) women currently serving as the speakers of State Houses.

- Julie McCluskie (D-CO)
- Adrienne A. Jones (D-MD)
- Melissa Hortman (D-MN)
- Julie Fahey (D-OR)
- Joanna McClinton (D-PA)
- Jill Krowinski (D-VT)
- Laurie Jinkins (D-WA)
- Nadine Nakamura (D-HI)
- Melissa Minor-Brown (D-DE)
- Lisa Demuth (R-MN)

=== Current Women Presidents or Presidents Pro Tempore of Senates ===
There are 15 (11D, 4R) women currently serving as Presidents or Presidents Pro Tempore of State Senates. In some state the Lieutenant Governor is the President of the Senate

- Michelle Kidani (D-HI)- Vice President of the Hawaii Senate
- Amy Sinclair (R-IA)- President of the Iowa Senate
- Regina Ashford Barrow (D-LA)- President pro tempore of the Louisiana Senate
- Karen Spilka (D-MA)- President of the Massachusetts Senate
- Ann H. Rest (D-MN)- President pro tempore of the Minnesota Senate
- Shirley Turner (D-NJ)- President pro tempore of the New Jersey Senate
- Mimi Stewart (D-NM)- President pro tempore of the New Mexico Senate
- Andrea Stewart-Cousins (D-NY)- Temporary President and Majority Leader of the New York State Senate
- Kim L. Ward (R-PA)- President pro tempore of the Pennsylvania Senate
- Hanna M. Gallo (D-RI)- President pro tempore of the Rhode Island Senate
- Louise Lucas (D-VA) President pro tempore of the Virginia Senate
- Winsome Sears (R-VA) President of the Virginia Senate in her role as Lieutenant Governor of Virginia
- Donna J. Boley (R-WV)- President pro tempore of the West Virginia Senate
- Eleni Kounalakis (D-CA)- President of the California Senate in her role as Lieutenant Governor of California
- Leslie Rutledge (R-AK)- President of the Arkansas Senate in her role as Lieutenant Governor of Arkansas
- Dafna Michaelson Jenet (D-CO)- President pro tempore of the Colorado Senate
- Susan Bysiewicz (D-CT)- President of the Connecticut Senate in her role as Lieutenant Governor of Connecticut
- Kyle Evans Gay (D-DE)- President of the Delaware Senate in her role as Lieutenant Governor of Delaware
- Mattie Daughtry (D-ME)-President of the Maine Senate
- Cindy O'Laughlin (R-MO)- President pro tempore of the Missouri Senate
- Marilyn Dondero Loop (D-NV)- President pro tempore of the Nevada Senate
- Sharon Carson (R-NH)- President of the New Hampshire Senate
- Rachel Hunt (D-NC)- President of the North Carolina Senate in her role as Lieutenant Governor of North Carolina
- Michelle Strinden (R-ND)- President of the North Dakota Senate in her role as Lieutenant Governor of North Dakota
- Mary Felzkowski (R-WI)- President of the Wisconsin Senate

== Female State Legislators by Race and Ethnicity ==
According to the Center for American Women and Politics (CAWP), 99 representatives identify as Asian American/Pacific Islander, 383 identify as Black, 192 identify as Latina, 14 identify as Middle Eastern/North African, 36 identify as Native American/Alaska Native/Native Hawaiian, 3 identify as Multiracial Alone, and 1735 identify as white.
