= List of the first women holders of political offices in the United States =

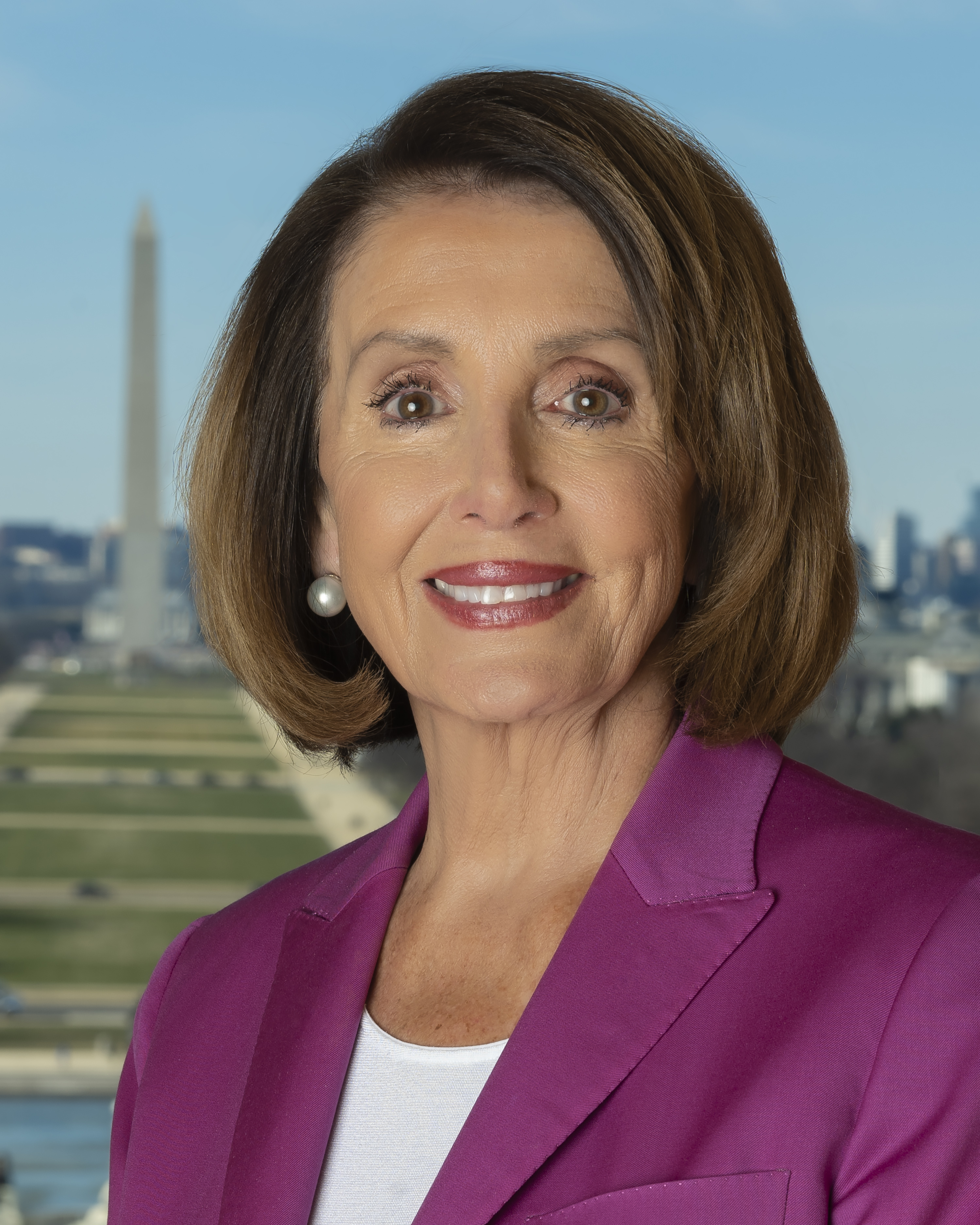
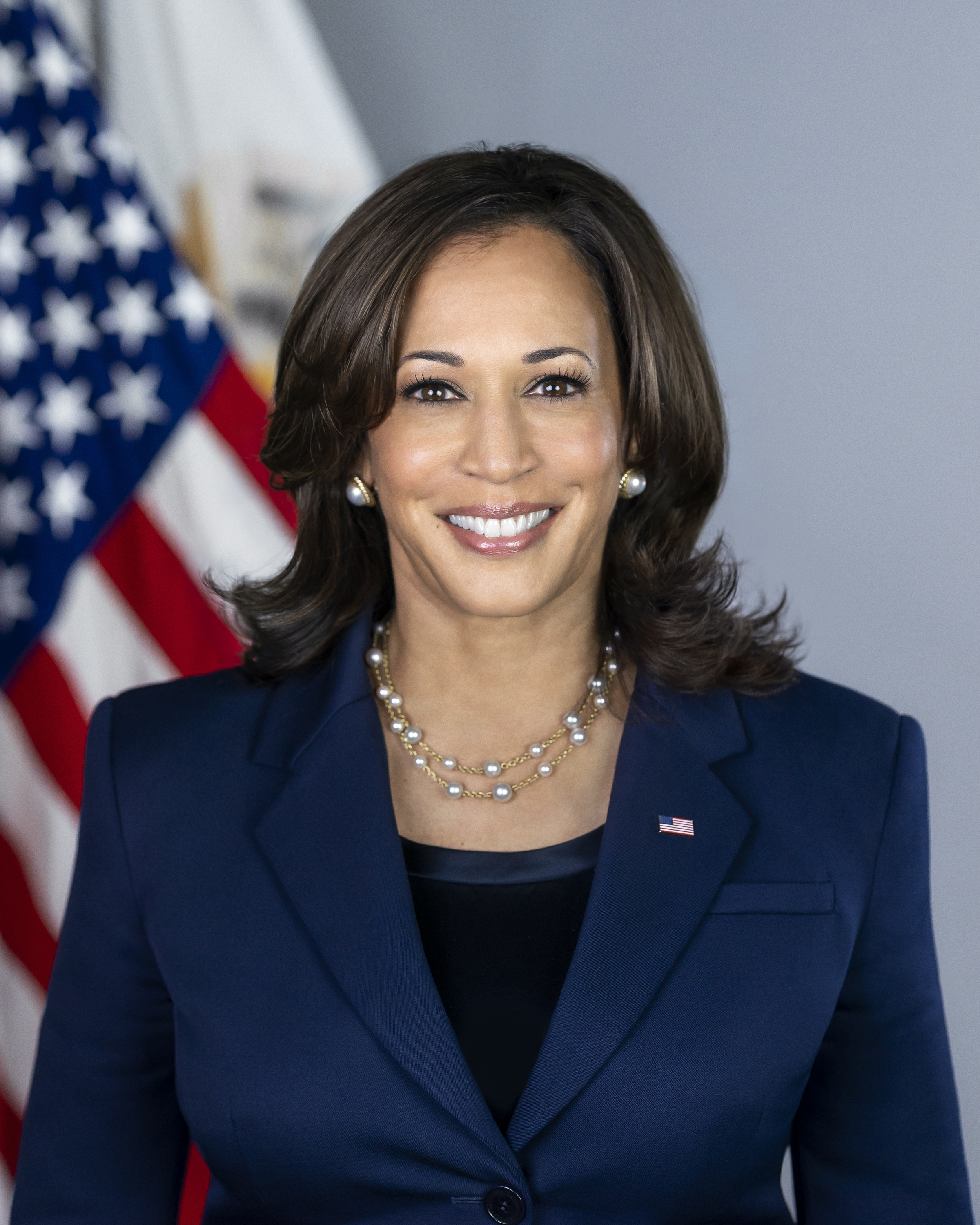
American women political firsts:
- Nancy Pelosi (left) was the first woman to serve as Speaker of the United States House of Representatives.
- Kamala Harris (right) was the first woman to serve as Vice President of the United States.

Throughout the history of the United States, various women have become the first to hold numerous political positions. At the federal level, Frances Perkins became the first female member of the Cabinet of the United States upon becoming Secretary of Labor in 1933. Women have gone on to serve as the heads of various other executive branch departments. Moreover, although no woman has ever been President of the United States, Kamala Harris became the first female Vice President of the United States in 2021.

In the United States Congress, Jeannette Rankin became the first female legislator upon entering the United States House of Representatives in 1917. Five years later, Rebecca Latimer Felton became the first woman to serve in the United States Senate. In 2007, Nancy Pelosi became the first female Speaker of the United States House of Representatives.

At the state level, Nellie Tayloe Ross became the first woman to serve as a governor in the United States, becoming Governor of Wyoming in 1925. (Note: In addition, Miriam A. Ferguson became Governor of Texas in 1925.) Women have also been the first in statewide positions such as lieutenant governor and legislative speaker.

Finally, at the local level, Susanna M. Salter became the first female mayor in the United States, becoming the chief executive of Argonia, Kansas in 1887. Women have also been the first to serve in other municipal positions, including boards of education.

This article excludes women firsts in American judicial courts. In the federal judiciary, although six women (Note: Sandra Day O'Connor, Ruth Bader Ginsburg, Sonia Sotomayor, Elena Kagan, Amy Coney Barrett, and Ketanji Brown Jackson) have served as Associate Justice of the Supreme Court of the United States, there has never been a female chief justice of the United States.

== Federal ==
=== Executive ===
==== Presidential line of succession ====
Except for Speaker of the House of Representatives and President pro tempore of the Senate, all of the following offices are part of the Cabinet of the United States.

Image	Name	Start of tenure	End of tenure	Rank in presidential succession	Office of first	Notes
Portrait of Kamala Harris	Kamala Harris	January 20, 2021	January 20, 2025	1	Vice President	
Portrait of Nancy Pelosi	Nancy Pelosi	January 4, 2007	January 3, 2011	2	Speaker of the House of Representatives	(Note: This office is traditionally considered part of the legislature of the United States.)
Portrait of Nancy Pelosi	Nancy Pelosi	January 3, 2019	January 3, 2023	2	Speaker of the House of Representatives	(Note: This office is traditionally considered part of the legislature of the United States.)
Portrait of Patty Murray	Patty Murray	January 3, 2023	January 3, 2025	3	President pro tempore of the Senate	(Note: This office is traditionally considered part of the legislature of the United States.)
Portrait of Madeleine Albright	Madeleine Albright	January 23, 1997	January 20, 2001	4	Secretary of State	
Portrait of Janet Yellen	Janet Yellen	January 26, 2021	January 20, 2025	5	Secretary of the Treasury	
	None			6	Secretary of Defense	
Portrait of Janet Reno	Janet Reno	March 12, 1993	January 20, 2001	7	Attorney General	
Portrait of Gale Norton	Gale Norton	January 31, 2001	March 31, 2006	8	Secretary of the Interior	
Portrait of Ann Veneman	Ann Veneman	January 20, 2001	January 20, 2005	9	Secretary of Agriculture	
Portrait of Juanita M. Kreps	Juanita M. Kreps	January 23, 1977	October 31, 1979	10	Secretary of Commerce	
Portrait of Frances Perkins	Frances Perkins	March 4, 1933	June 30, 1945	11	Secretary of Labor	(Note: Perkins was the first woman to serve as a secretary in the Cabinet of the United States.)
Portrait of Oveta Culp Hobby	Oveta Culp Hobby	April 11, 1953	July 31, 1955	12	Secretary of Health and Human Services (Note: Until 1980, this office was called Secretary of Health, Education, and Welfare. The first woman to assume this office under the current title was Patricia Roberts Harris.)	
Portrait of Carla Anderson Hills	Carla Anderson Hills	March 10, 1975	January 20, 1977	13	Secretary of Housing and Urban Development	
Portrait of Elizabeth Dole	Elizabeth Dole	February 7, 1983	September 30, 1987	14	Secretary of Transportation	
Portrait of Hazel R. O'Leary	Hazel R. O'Leary	January 22, 1993	January 20, 1997	15	Secretary of Energy	
Portrait of Shirley Hufstedler	Shirley Hufstedler	November 30, 1979	January 20, 1981	16	Secretary of Education	
	None			17	Secretary of Veterans Affairs	
Portrait of Janet Napolitano	Janet Napolitano	January 21, 2009	September 6, 2013	18	Secretary of Homeland Security	

==== Department heads ====
In addition to the positions listed below, in 2003, Susan Livingstone became the first woman to serve as United States Secretary of the Navy in an acting capacity.

Image	Name	Start of tenure	End of tenure	Title of department	Notes
Portrait of Megan Brennan	Megan Brennan	February 1, 2015	June 15, 2020	Postmaster General	(Note: The postmaster general ceased to be a member of the United States Cabinet in 1971.)
Portrait of Sheila Widnall	Sheila Widnall	August 6, 1993	October 31, 1997	Secretary of the Air Force	(Note: The secretary of the Air Force ceased to be a member of the United States Cabinet in 1949.)
Portrait of Christine Wormuth	Christine Wormuth	May 28, 2021	January 20, 2025	Secretary of the Army	(Note: The secretary of the Army ceased to be a member of the United States Cabinet in 1949.)

==== Advisors ====
Image	Name	Start of tenure	End of tenure	Title of office	Notes
Portrait of Carla Anderson Hills	Carla Anderson Hills	February 6, 1989	January 20, 1993	Trade Representative	
Portrait of Laura Tyson	Laura Tyson	February 5, 1993	April 22, 1995	Chair of the Council of Economic Advisers	
Portrait of Laura Tyson	Laura Tyson	February 21, 1995	December 12, 1996	Director of the National Economic Council	
Portrait of Alice Rivlin	Alice Rivlin	October 17, 1994	April 26, 1996	Director of the Office of Management and Budget	
Portrait of Condoleezza Rice	Condoleezza Rice	January 20, 2001	January 26, 2005	National Security Advisor	
Portrait of Susie Wiles	Susie Wiles	January 20, 2025	Incumbent	White House Chief of Staff	

=== Legislative ===
==== Senate ====
Fifteen states have not had female representation in the United States Senate.

Image	Name	Start of first term	End of last term	State of first	Notes
Portrait of Rebecca Latimer Felton	Rebecca Latimer Felton	October 3, 1922	November 22, 1922	Georgia	(Note: Felton was the first woman to be appointed to the United States Senate.)
Portrait of Hattie Caraway	Hattie Caraway	November 13, 1931	January 3, 1945	Arkansas	(Note: Caraway was the first woman to be elected to the United States Senate, in 1932. She was also the first woman to preside over the Senate, in 1943.)
Portrait of Rose McConnell Long	Rose McConnell Long	January 31, 1936	January 3, 1937	Louisiana	
Portrait of Dixie Bibb Graves	Dixie Bibb Graves	August 20, 1937	January 10, 1938	Alabama	
Portrait of Gladys Pyle	Gladys Pyle	November 9, 1938	January 3, 1939	South Dakota	
Portrait of Margaret Chase Smith	Margaret Chase Smith	January 3, 1949 (Note: Smith had previously served in the United States House of Representatives.)	January 3, 1973	Maine	(Note: Smith was the first woman to serve in both houses of the United States Congress.)
Portrait of Eva Bowring	Eva Bowring	April 16, 1954	November 7, 1954	Nebraska	
Portrait of Maurine Neuberger	Maurine Neuberger	November 9, 1960	January 3, 1967	Oregon	
Portrait of Muriel Humphrey	Muriel Humphrey	January 25, 1978	November 7, 1978	Minnesota	
Portrait of Nancy Kassebaum	Nancy Kassebaum	December 23, 1978	January 3, 1997	Kansas	
Portrait of Paula Hawkins	Paula Hawkins	January 1, 1981	January 3, 1987	Florida	
Portrait of Barbara Mikulski	Barbara Mikulski	January 3, 1987	January 3, 2017	Maryland	
Portrait of Jocelyn Burdick	Jocelyn Burdick	September 12, 1992	December 14, 1992	North Dakota	
Portrait of Dianne Feinstein	Dianne Feinstein	November 4, 1992	September 29, 2023	California	
Portrait of Carol Moseley Braun	Carol Moseley Braun	January 3, 1993	January 3, 1999	Illinois	
Portrait of Patty Murray	Patty Murray	January 3, 1993	Incumbent	Washington	(Note: Murray became the first female president pro tempore of the United States Senate in 2023.)
Portrait of Kay Bailey Hutchison	Kay Bailey Hutchison	June 14, 1993	January 3, 2013	Texas	
Portrait of Debbie Stabenow	Debbie Stabenow	January 3, 2001	January 3, 2025	Michigan	
Portrait of Jean Carnahan	Jean Carnahan	January 3, 2001	November 23, 2002	Missouri	
Portrait of Hillary Clinton	Hillary Clinton	January 3, 2001	January 21, 2009	New York	
Portrait of Lisa Murkowski	Lisa Murkowski	December 20, 2002	Incumbent	Alaska	
Portrait of Elizabeth Dole	Elizabeth Dole	January 3, 2003	January 3, 2009	North Carolina	
Portrait of Jeanne Shaheen	Jeanne Shaheen	January 3, 2009	Incumbent	New Hampshire	
Portrait of Mazie Hirono	Mazie Hirono	January 3, 2013	Incumbent	Hawaii	
Portrait of Elizabeth Warren	Elizabeth Warren	January 3, 2013	Incumbent	Massachusetts	
Portrait of Tammy Baldwin	Tammy Baldwin	January 3, 2013 (Note: Baldwin had previously served in the United States House of Representatives.)	Incumbent	Wisconsin	
Portrait of Joni Ernst	Joni Ernst	January 3, 2015	Incumbent	Iowa	
Portrait of Shelley Moore Capito	Shelley Moore Capito	January 3, 2015	Incumbent	West Virginia	
Portrait of Catherine Cortez Masto	Catherine Cortez Masto	January 3, 2017	Incumbent	Nevada	
Portrait of Cindy Hyde-Smith	Cindy Hyde-Smith	April 2, 2018	Incumbent	Mississippi	
Portrait of Martha McSally	Martha McSally	January 3, 2019	December 2, 2020	Arizona	
Portrait of Kyrsten Sinema	Kyrsten Sinema	January 3, 2019 (Note: Sinema had previously served in the United States House of Representatives.)	January 3, 2025	Arizona	
Portrait of Marsha Blackburn	Marsha Blackburn	January 3, 2019	Incumbent	Tennessee	
Portrait of Cynthia Lummis	Cynthia Lummis	January 3, 2021	Incumbent	Wyoming	
Portrait of Lisa Blunt Rochester	Lisa Blunt Rochester	January 3, 2025 (Note: Blunt Rochester had previously served in the United States House of Representatives.)	Incumbent	Delaware	
Official Portrait of Darline Graham Nordone	Darline Graham	July 14, 2026	Incumbent	South Carolina	

==== House of Representatives ====
Mississippi is the only state that has not had female representation in the United States House of Representatives.

Image	Name	Start of first term	End of last term	State of first (Note: The name of each representative's state is listed, followed by the specific congressional district she represented.)	Notes
Portrait of Jeannette Rankin	Jeannette Rankin	March 4, 1917	March 3, 1919	Montana (MT-AL)	(Note: Rankin was the first woman elected to the House of Representatives.)
Portrait of Jeannette Rankin	Jeannette Rankin	January 3, 1941	January 3, 1943	Montana (MT-1)	(Note: Rankin was the first woman elected to the House of Representatives.)
Portrait of Alice Robertson	Alice Robertson	March 4, 1921	March 3, 1923	Oklahoma (OK-2)	
Portrait of Winnifred Mason Huck	Winnifred Mason Huck	November 7, 1922	March 3, 1923	Illinois (IL-AL)	
Portrait of Mae Nolan	Mae Nolan	January 23, 1923	March 3, 1925	California (CA-5)	
Portrait of Mary Teresa Norton	Mary Teresa Norton	March 4, 1925	January 3, 1951	New Jersey (NJ-12; 1925–1933)	
Portrait of Mary Teresa Norton	Mary Teresa Norton	March 4, 1925	January 3, 1951	New Jersey (NJ-13; 1933–1951)	
Portrait of Edith Nourse Rogers	Edith Nourse Rogers	June 30, 1925	September 10, 1960	Massachusetts (MA-5)	
Portrait of Katherine G. Langley	Katherine G. Langley	March 4, 1927	March 4, 1931	Kentucky (KY-10)	
Portrait of Pearl P. Oldfield	Pearl P. Oldfield	January 11, 1929	March 4, 1931	Arkansas (AR-2)	
Portrait of Pearl P. Oldfield	Ruth Bryan Owen	March 4, 1929	March 3, 1933	Florida (FL-4)	
Portrait of Ruth Baker Pratt	Ruth Baker Pratt	March 4, 1929	March 3, 1933	New York (NY-17)	
Portrait of Willa Blake Eslick	Willa Blake Eslick	August 13, 1932	March 3, 1933	Tennessee (TN-7)	
Portrait of Virginia E. Jenckes	Virginia E. Jenckes	March 4, 1933	January 3, 1939	Indiana (IN-6)	
Portrait of Kathryn O'Loughlin McCarthy	Kathryn O'Loughlin McCarthy	March 4, 1933	January 3, 1935	Kansas (KS-6)	
Portrait of Isabella Greenway	Isabella Greenway	October 3, 1933	January 3, 1937	Arizona (AZ-AL)	
Portrait of Nan Wood Honeyman	Nan Wood Honeyman	January 3, 1937	January 3, 1939	Oregon (OR-3)	
Portrait of Elizabeth Hawley Gasque	Elizabeth Hawley Gasque	September 13, 1938	January 3, 1939	South Carolina (SC-6)	
Portrait of Frances P. Bolton	Frances P. Bolton	February 27, 1940	January 3, 1969	Ohio (OH-22)	
Portrait of Margaret Chase Smith	Margaret Chase Smith	June 3, 1940	January 3, 1949 (Note: Smith went on to become a United States senator on this date.)	Maine (ME-2)	(Note: Smith was the first woman to serve in both houses of the United States Congress.)
Portrait of Florence Reville Gibbs	Florence Reville Gibbs	October 3, 1940	January 3, 1941	Georgia (GA-6)	
Portrait of Katharine Byron	Katharine Byron	May 27, 1941	January 3, 1943	Maryland (MD-6)	
Portrait of Veronica Grace Boland	Veronica Grace Boland	November 3, 1942	January 3, 1943	Pennsylvania (PA-11)	
Portrait of Clare Boothe Luce	Clare Boothe Luce	January 3, 1943	January 3, 1947	Connecticut (CT-4)	
Portrait of Eliza Jane Pratt	Eliza Jane Pratt	May 25, 1946	January 3, 1947	North Carolina (NC-8)	
Portrait of Georgia Lee Lusk	Georgia Lee Lusk	January 3, 1947	January 3, 1949	New Mexico (NM-AL; Seat A)	
Portrait of Reva Beck Bosone	Reva Beck Bosone	January 3, 1949	January 3, 1953	Utah (UT-2)	
Portrait of Ruth Thompson	Ruth Thompson	January 3, 1951	January 3, 1957	Michigan (MI-9)	
Portrait of Elizabeth Kee	Elizabeth Kee	July 17, 1951	January 3, 1965	West Virginia (WV-5)	
Portrait of Gracie Pfost	Gracie Pfost	January 3, 1953	January 3, 1963	Idaho (ID-1)	
Portrait of Leonor Sullivan	Leonor Sullivan	January 3, 1953	January 3, 1977	Missouri (MO-3)	
Portrait of Coya Knutson	Coya Knutson	January 3, 1955	January 3, 1959	Minnesota (MN-9)	
Portrait of Catherine Dean May	Catherine Dean May	January 3, 1959	January 3, 1971	Washington (WA-4)	
Portrait of Patsy Mink	Patsy Mink	January 3, 1965	January 3, 1977	Hawaii (HI-AL; Seat B; 1965–1971)	
Portrait of Patsy Mink	Patsy Mink	January 3, 1965	January 3, 1977	Hawaii (HI-2; 1971–1977)	
Portrait of Patsy Mink	Patsy Mink	September 22, 1990	September 28, 2002	Hawaii (HI-2)	
Portrait of Lera Millard Thomas	Lera Millard Thomas	March 26, 1966	January 3, 1967	Texas (TX-8)	
Portrait of Elizabeth B. Andrews	Elizabeth B. Andrews	April 4, 1972	January 3, 1973	Alabama (AL-3)	
Portrait of Pat Schroeder	Pat Schroeder	January 3, 1973	January 3, 1997	Colorado (CO-1)	
Portrait of Lindy Boggs	Lindy Boggs	March 20, 1973	January 3, 1991	Louisiana (LA-2)	
Portrait of Virginia D. Smith	Virginia D. Smith	January 3, 1975	January 3, 1991	Nebraska (NE-3)	
Portrait of Claudine Schneider	Claudine Schneider	January 3, 1981	January 3, 1991	Rhode Island (RI-2)	
Portrait of Barbara Vucanovich	Barbara Vucanovich	January 3, 1983	January 3, 1997	Nevada (NV-2)	
Portrait of Leslie Byrne	Leslie Byrne	January 3, 1993	January 3, 1995	Virginia (VA-11)	
Portrait of Barbara Cubin	Barbara Cubin	January 3, 1995	January 3, 2009	Wyoming (WY-AL)	
Portrait of Tammy Baldwin	Tammy Baldwin	January 3, 1999	January 3, 2013 (Note: Baldwin went on to become a United States senator on this date.)	Wisconsin (WI-2)	
Portrait of Stephanie Herseth Sandlin	Stephanie Herseth Sandlin	July 12, 2004	January 3, 2011	South Dakota (SD-AL)	
Portrait of Carol Shea-Porter	Carol Shea-Porter	January 3, 2007	January 3, 2011	New Hampshire (NH-1)	
Portrait of Carol Shea-Porter	Carol Shea-Porter	January 3, 2013	January 3, 2015	New Hampshire (NH-1)	
Portrait of Carol Shea-Porter	Carol Shea-Porter	January 3, 2017	January 3, 2019	New Hampshire (NH-1)	
Portrait of Lisa Blunt Rochester	Lisa Blunt Rochester	January 3, 2017	January 3, 2025 (Note: Blunt Rochester went on to become a United States senator on this date.)	Delaware (DE-AL)	
Portrait of Cindy Axne	Cindy Axne	January 3, 2019	January 3, 2023	Iowa (IA-3)	
Portrait of Mary Peltola	Mary Peltola	September 13, 2022	January 3, 2025	Alaska (AK-AL)	
Portrait of Becca Balint	Becca Balint	January 3, 2023	Incumbent	Vermont (VT-AL)	
Portrait of Julie Fedorchak	Julie Fedorchak	January 3, 2025	Incumbent	North Dakota (ND-AL)	

===== Non-voting members =====
Image	Name	Start of first term	End of last term	Territory of first (Note: The name of each representative's territory is listed, followed by the specific congressional district she represented.)	Notes
Portrait of Eleanor Holmes Norton	Eleanor Holmes Norton	January 3, 1991	Incumbent	Washington, D.C. (DC-AL)	
Portrait of Donna Christensen	Donna Christensen	January 3, 1997	January 3, 2015	United States Virgin Islands (VI-AL)	
Portrait of Madeleine Bordallo	Madeleine Bordallo	January 3, 2003	January 3, 2019	Guam (GU-AL)	
Portrait of Amata Coleman Radewagen	Amata Coleman Radewagen	January 3, 2015	Incumbent	American Samoa (AS-AL)	
Portrait of Jenniffer González-Colón	Jenniffer González-Colón	January 3, 2017	January 2, 2025	Puerto Rico (PR-AL)	
Portrait of Kimberlyn King-Hinds	Kimberlyn King-Hinds	January 3, 2025	Incumbent	Northern Mariana Islands (CNMI-AL)	

== State ==
=== Governors ===
- Wyoming – Nellie Tayloe Ross in 1925
- Texas – Miriam A. Ferguson in 1925
- Alabama – Lurleen Wallace in 1967
- Connecticut – Ella T. Grasso in 1975
- Washington – Dixy Lee Ray in 1977
- New Hampshire – Vesta M. Roy in 1982
- Kentucky – Martha Collins in 1983
- Vermont – Madeleine Kunin in 1985
- Nebraska – Kay A. Orr in 1987
- Arizona – Rose Mofford in 1988
- Kansas – Joan Finney in 1991
- Oregon – Barbara Roberts in 1991
- New Jersey – Christine Todd Whitman in 1994
- Ohio – Nancy Hollister in 1998
- Montana – Judy Martz in 2001
- Delaware – Ruth Ann Minner in 2001
- Massachusetts – Jane Swift in 2001
- Hawaii – Linda Lingle in 2002
- Michigan – Jennifer Granholm in 2003
- Utah – Olene Walker in 2003
- Louisiana – Kathleen Blanco in 2004
- Alaska – Sarah Palin in 2006
- North Carolina – Bev Perdue in 2009
- New Mexico – Susana Martinez in 2011
- Oklahoma – Mary Fallin in 2011
- South Carolina – Nikki Haley in 2011
- Rhode Island – Gina Raimondo in 2015
- Iowa – Kim Reynolds in 2017
- Maine – Janet Mills in 2019
- South Dakota – Kristi Noem in 2019
- New York – Kathy Hochul in 2021
- Arkansas – Sarah Huckabee Sanders in 2023
- Virginia – Abigail Spanberger in 2026

=== Other officials ===
- State legislator – Carrie C. Holly, Clara Cressingham, and Frances S. Klock, all of Colorado in 1894
- State Senator – Martha Hughes Cannon of Utah in 1896
- First woman to serve in both houses of a state legislature (Note: The Nebraska Legislature is unicameral.) – Edna Beard of Vermont in 1923
- Speaker of a state legislature – Minnie Davenport Craig of North Dakota in 1933
- Lieutenant governor – Consuelo Northrop Bailey of Vermont in 1955
- Majority leader of a state senate – Sandra Day O'Connor of Arizona in 1972

== Local ==
- Superintendent of Public Education – Ellen Webster in 1872 in Harvey County, Kansas
- Superintendent of Public Education – Mary Higby in 1872 in Labette County, Kansas
- Board of Education – Lydia Sayer Hasbrouck in 1880
- Mayor – Susanna M. Salter in 1887
- Chief of the Cherokee Nation – Wilma Mankiller in 1985
- Chairwoman of the Tohono O'odham Nation – Vivian Juan-Saunders in 2003

== See also ==
- Female state legislators in the United States
- Feminism in the United States
- List of American women's firsts
- List of female United States presidential and vice presidential candidates
- List of first openly LGBTQ politicians in the United States
- List of first women lawyers and judges in the United States
  - Sandra Day O'Connor – First woman to serve as a United States Supreme Court justice
- History of women in the United States
- Timeline of women in the United States
- Women in the United States Armed Forces
- Women's suffrage in the United States
