= Balz =

Balz as a reduced form of the male given name Balthasar is a German-language surname. Notable persons with that name include:

- Arcada Balz (1879–1973), American educator, clubwoman, and politician
- Bruno Balz (1902–1988), German songwriter
- Burkhard Balz (born 1969), German politician
- Caroline Balz, Swiss curler
- Dan Balz (born 1946), American journalist
- Ernst Balz (1904–1943), German sculptor
- Erwin Bälz (1849–1913), German internist, anthropologist, and physician in Japan
- Heiko Balz (born 1969), German Freestyle wrestler

== See also ==
- Balz–Schiemann reaction, a chemical reaction
- Water Balz, an expandable water toy
- BALZ, a file compression method in PeaZip
- Baltz
- Belz (disambiguation)
