= 1893 Colorado women's suffrage referendum =

- November 7, 1893

Results
Choice	Votes	%
Yes	35,798	54.78%
No	29,551	45.22%
Total votes	65,349	100.00%
County results
Yes
70–80%
60–70%
50–60%
No
70–80%
60–70%
50–60%

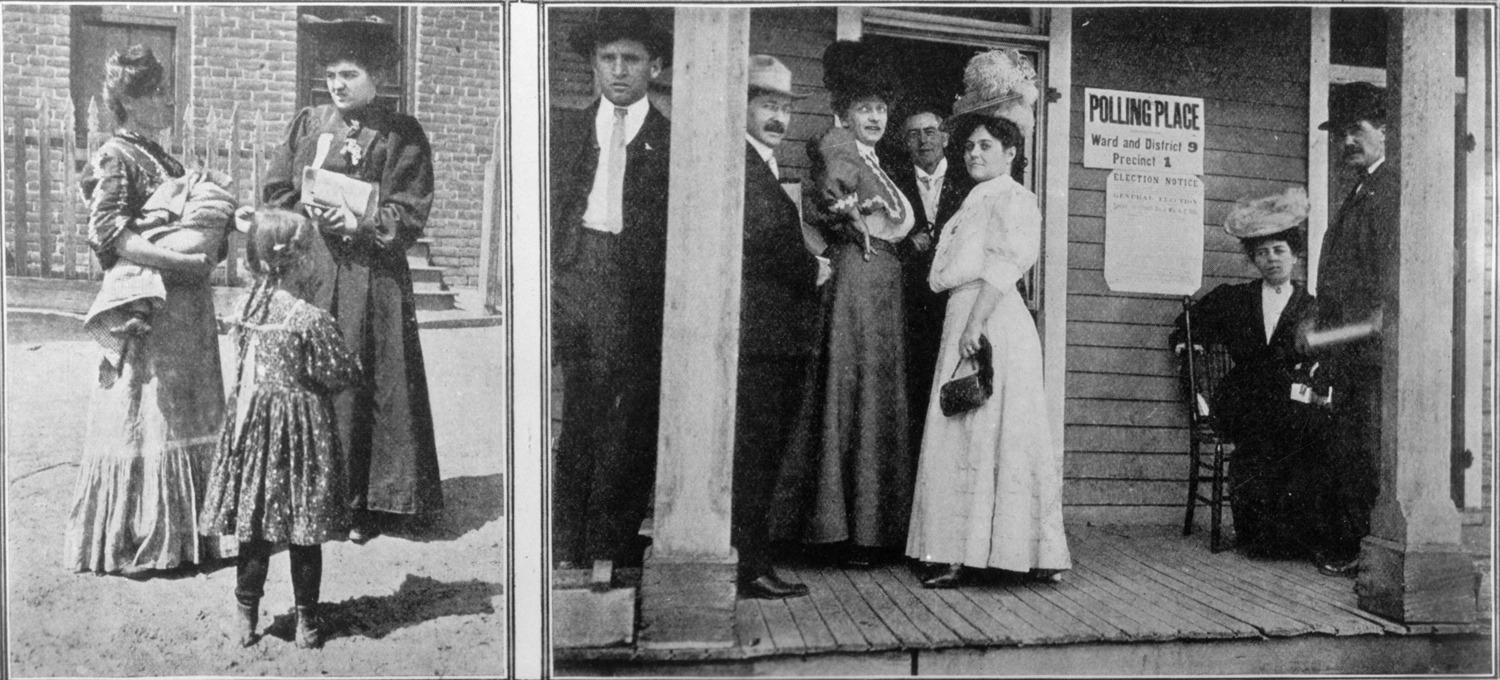
Men and women outside a polling station in Colorado 1893.

On November 7, 1893, a referendum on women's suffrage was held in Colorado that secured women's voting rights. Subsequently, Colorado became the first American state to enact women's suffrage by popular referendum. The act granted women the right to vote "in the same manner in all respects as male persons are."

== Historical background ==
Before Colorado, two western states and territories had already granted women's suffrage, namely Wyoming and Utah. Influenced by the actions of female activists in those states, Colorado's own suffrage movement began to gain traction in the 1870s. Throughout the earlier half of the decade, many propositions urging legislators to grant suffrage were defeated.

On January 10, 1876, suffrage advocates held a convention at the Unity Church in Denver, intending to influence the state's constitutional convention. The convention established the Territorial Women's Suffrage Society, which turned into the Women's Suffrage Association of Colorado once Colorado was granted statehood. The Non-Partisan Equal Suffrage Association was eventually backed by Governor John Routt. A minority report was created and sent to the convention. Women were not granted the right to vote, but they were granted the right to vote in school elections and hold school offices.

With the backing of John Routt, the women's suffrage movement gained traction. In 1877, male legislators decided to hold a referendum to determine the voting status of women. Although the movement gained the recognition of many popular suffrage advocates, such as Susan B. Anthony, suffrage was defeated. Legislative efforts between 1877 and 1893 were sparse. In 1881, a bill for municipal suffrage was sent to Legislature and lost. However, during that time, many grassroots organizations still were still holding meetings and advocating for women's rights.

In 1893, the Ninth General Assembly passed a motion to put the question of women's suffrage up for election. As a result, the Colorado Non-Partisan Equal Suffrage Association was integral to the 1893 referendum. It was a grassroots coalition of women's organizations, churches, political parties, charity groups, unions and farmers alliances. Having no members or money to their name, the organization toured around the state, rallying for support. Their campaign pivoted to directly address the women of Colorado: "Women of Colorado, do you know the opportunity that is before you this fall? Do you know that there is a possibility you may rise to legal equality with man?" one leaflet asked the state's women. "Awake from your indifference . . . The ballot is the greatest power and protection of this day and age."

== 1893 Referendum ==
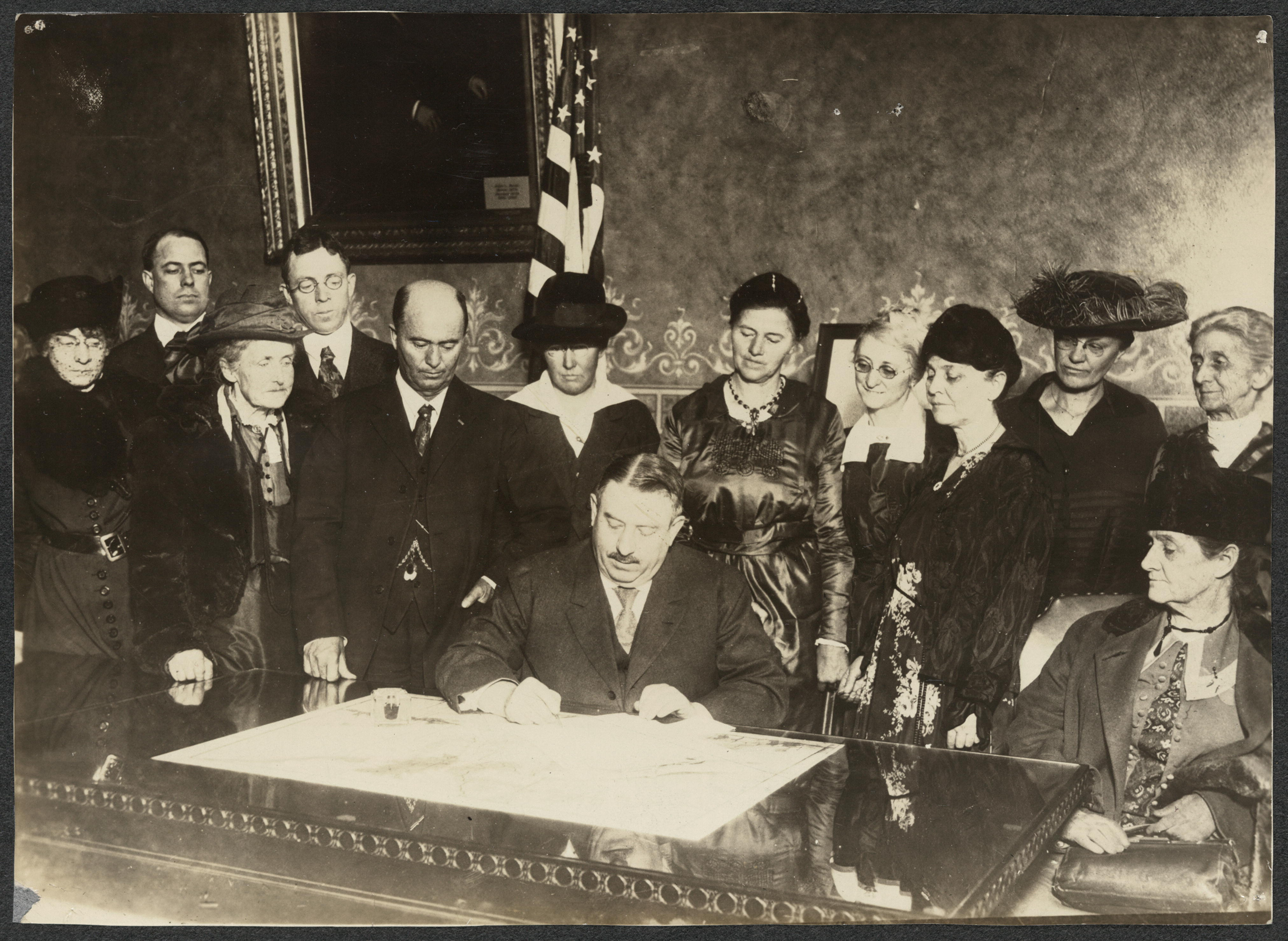
Colorado's ratification of suffrage amendment

The act itself was drafted by lawyer J. Warner Mills of Denver and sponsored by Rep. J.T. Heath of Montrose County. After the bill was presented in the Colorado General Assembly, anti-suffragists placed a copy of their journal, the Remonstrance, on the desk of ever legislator. The suffrage bill left committee and went to the House on January 24, 1893. After a first attempt, the bill failed in the house by 39 to 21. It came up for another vote on March 8. At this vote, it passed 34 to 27. It was then introduced in the Senate and passed there on April 3 by 20 to 10. Then the bill was signed by governor Davis Hanson Waite. The general election where the referendum would appear would be held in fall of 1893.

In the end, 55% of the electorate turned out to vote, with 35,798 voting in favor and 29,551 voting against. The Delta Independent had a headline that read "Women will vote in this state just like a man" after women won the vote.

== Legacy ==
In the months after the passing of the 1893 Suffrage Bill, the number of women learning political history skyrocketed. One Denver firm reported selling a larger number of books on political economy during the first eight months than they had in the 20 years before. The following year, three Colorado women - Clara Cressingham, Carrie Clyde Holly and Frances Klock - became the first women to be elected to any legislature in U.S. history when they were elected to the Colorado House of Representatives. However, despite this support, the General Assembly was almost entirely controlled by men. Women were, however, able to exert their influence a little, through the enaction of Prohibition bills. Even after legislation passed, the Non-Partisan Equal Suffrage Association remained active for many years, advocating for suffrage in other states across America.

In 1919 the US congress voted in favor of the 19th amendment and needed 36 states to vote in its favor. This amendment was ratified on December 15, 1920, by Colorado. Colorado was one of 35 other states that had recognized women's suffrage rights in 1920.

== See also ==
- Women's suffrage in Colorado
- Women's suffrage in the United States
- Women's suffrage in states of the United States
