= Belz (disambiguation) =

Belz is a town in Ukraine.

Belz may also refer to:

== Places ==
- Belz (crater), a crater on Mars, named after the Ukrainian town
- Belz, Morbihan, Brittany, France
- Belz, the German spelling of Bălți, Moldova
- Belz Great Synagogue, Jerusalem, Israel
- Belz Museum of Asian and Judaic Art, Memphis, Tennessee, USA
- Duchy of Belz, a medieval state

== People ==
- Belz (Hasidic dynasty), a Hasidic dynasty from the Ukrainian town
- "The Belz", nickname of comedian Richard Belzer
- Christian Belz (born 1974), Swiss long-distance runner
- Corinna Belz, German documentary filmmaker
- Gabrielle Belz, Australian immunologist
- Joel Belz (1941–2024), American publisher

== Other ==
- Belz Enterprises, an American company

== See also ==
- Balz (disambiguation)
