= Baelz =

Baelz is a surname. Notable persons with that name include:

- Peter Baelz (1923–2000), Anglican priest and theologian
- Hakos Baelz, Australian VTuber and singer
- Erwin Bälz (Baelz; 1849–1913), German physician active in Imperial Japan

== See also ==
- Balz
