= Senator Gant =

Senator Gant may refer to:

- Jason Gant (born 1976), South Dakota State Senate
- Mary Gant (born 1936), Missouri State Senate
