= Sara Andersen =

Sara Andersen may refer to:

- Sara Thrige (Sara Gedsted Thrige Andersen), Danish footballer
- Sara Nicole Andersen, Norwegian-Iranian model and beauty pageant titleholder

== See also ==
- Sarah Andersen, American cartoonist
- Sarah Anderson (disambiguation)
