= Electoral firsts in the United States =

Electoral firsts in the United States include:

- List of first African-American mayors
- List of first African-American U.S. state legislators
- List of first openly LGBT politicians in the United States
- List of the first women holders of political offices in the United States

== See also ==
- List of first minority male lawyers and judges in the United States
- List of first women lawyers and judges in the United States
