= Dorothy Devereux =

Dorothy Devereux may refer to:

- Dorothy Percy, Countess of Northumberland (1565–1619), née Devereux, English noblewoman
- Dorothy L. Devereux (1911–1994), American politician from Hawaii
