= Baltz =

Baltz is a surname. Notable people with the surname include:

- Kirk Baltz (born 1959), American actor
- Lewis Baltz (1945–2014), American photographer
- Mark Baltz (born 1948), American football official
- Mary C. Baltz (1923–2011), American soil scientist
- Meade Baltz (1912–1994), American businessman and politician
- Stephen Baltz (1949–1960), American air crash fatality
- Tim Baltz (born 1981), American comedian
- William N. Baltz (1860–1943), American politician
