= Frank P. Walsh =

American lawyer (1864–1939)

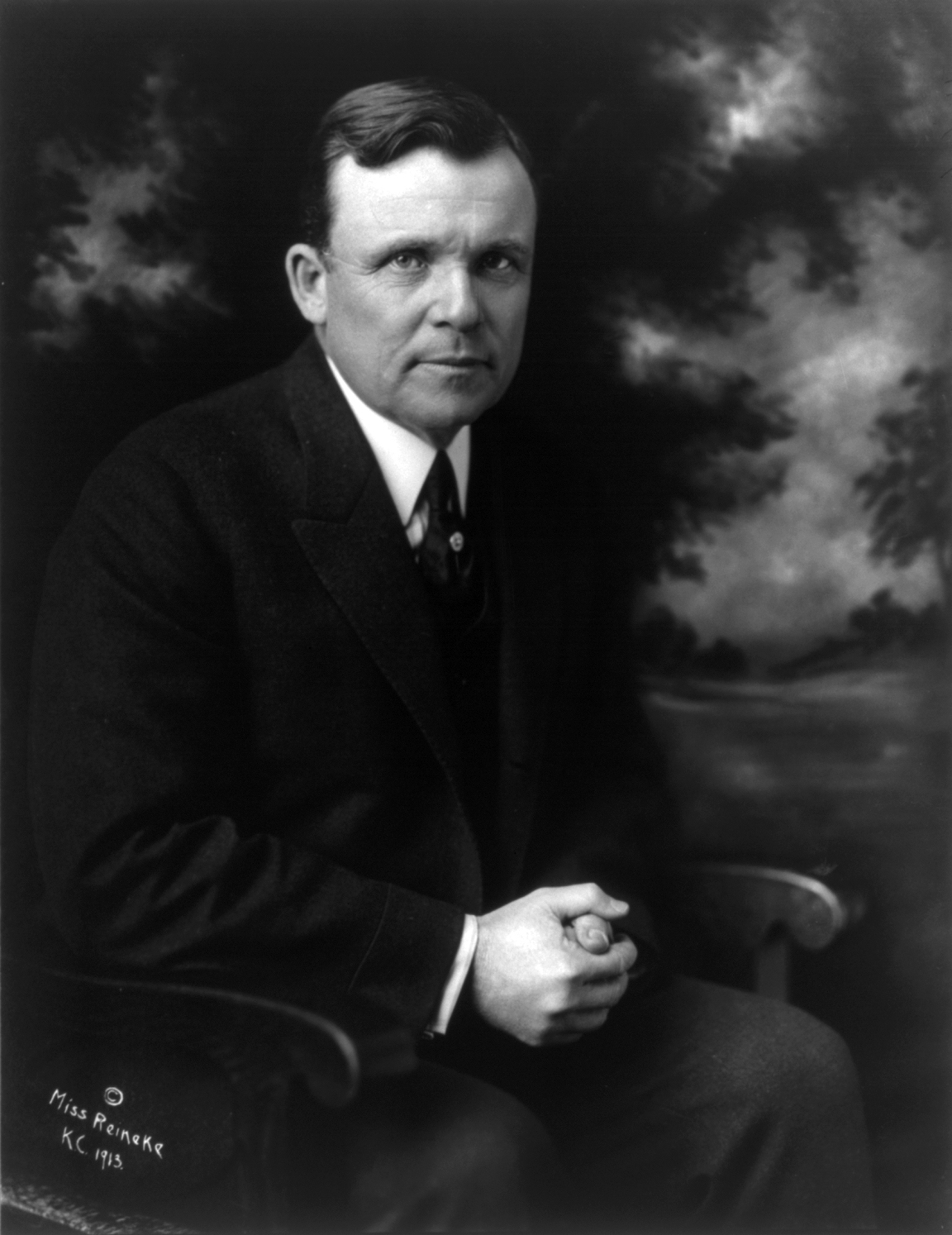
- Born: Francis Patrick Walsh; July 20, 1864; St. Louis, Missouri, U.S.
- Died: May 2, 1939 (aged 74); New York City, New York, U.S.
- Resting place: Mount St. Mary's Cemetery; Kansas City, Missouri, U.S.
- Occupation: Lawyer
- Spouse: Katherine O'Flaherty (m. 1891)
- Children: 9

Francis Patrick Walsh (July 20, 1864 – May 2, 1939) was an American lawyer. Walsh was noted for his advocacy of progressive causes, including Georgism and the land value tax, improved working conditions, better pay for workers, and equal employment opportunities for all, including women. He was appointed to several high-profile committees to investigate and report on working conditions. He was also active in championing independence for Ireland.

== Early life ==
Frank P. Walsh was born in St. Louis, Missouri, on July 20, 1864. At age 10 he dropped out of public school and worked as a telegraph boy in St. Louis. He taught himself stenography, and was considered expert in that craft when he was admitted to the bar in 1889.

Walsh was employed as a clerk in lawyers' offices. In 1885 he moved to Kansas City, Missouri, and began working in the office of noted Kansas City lawyer Gardiner Lathrop (who is famous for co-founding the Kansas City Country Club, among other things). He gained sufficient experience in legal matters in that employment that he passed the bar exam in 1889 and immediately began to practice law in Kansas City, successfully defending Jesse E. James, son of the bandit Jesse James, on an accusation of train robbery in that same year. In 1910, Walsh defended B. Clark Hyde who was accused of murdering his father-in-law Thomas H. Swope.

== Career ==
Walsh was active in Kansas City municipal improvement projects, and was a member of the Kansas City Commercial Club in 1913 when he was nominated by President Woodrow Wilson to head the newly formed Commission on Industrial Relations. Walsh had previously considered supporting Theodore Roosevelt's Progressive Party, but after meeting Wilson he concluded that "Mr. Wilson's progressiveness was more progressive" than Roosevelt's.

Walsh told a reporter, "Our purpose is to inquire into the general conditions of labor in the principal industries of the United States, including agriculture, into relations between employers and employees, conditions of sanitation, safety, methods for avoiding or adjusting labor disputes through mediation and negotiation, the smuggling of Asiatics into the United States or its possessions, and the underlying causes of dissatisfaction in the industrial situation." Walsh investigated labor-management clashes from 1913 to 1918, and in 1918 was named co-chairman, with ex-President William Howard Taft, of the National War Labor Board. Taft formed an amiable relationship with Walsh, writing that Walsh "is a curious man":

He has cultivated the use of emotion, of an hysterical character, to secure a flow of words. He weeps and he brings into requisition all the arts of the jury lawyer.... However, in dealing with me, behind closed doors, I have found him amenable. He is an Irishman, with all the camaraderie of an Irishman.

Walsh was an Irish nationalist who chaired the American Commission on Irish Independence. He fell out of favor with Wilson for pushing for US recognition of the proclaimed Irish Republic.Walsh's activities in behalf of Irish Independence were analyzed by author Julie E. Manning in her 1989 book, Frank P. Walsh and the Irish Question.

Walsh was also a supporter of Indian nationalism and Egyptian nationalism. He was a co-Vice President of the Friends of Indian Freedom society and in 1919 wrote that "Were it not for my absorption, at present, in the Irish matter, I would throw myself into this Egyptian business with a will. In 1919 Walsh was involved in the founding of a worldwide anti-imperialist organisation, the 'League of Oppressed Peoples'.

In 1919 Walsh was retained by the National Women's Trade Union League, whose members had been ousted from their jobs as streetcar conductors at the conclusion of World War I. Walsh argued before the War Labor Board that women had the same rights as men to work. At the end of the case the WLB found in favor of the women's organization, and reversed a lower-court ruling on the subject.

The headline from an April 14, 1922 article in The New York Times concerning Walsh's court maneuvers indicates how Walsh was seen by the nation: "'Forget the Law', He Urges". The article describes a legal appeal to the US Railroad Labor Board, to forget the "legal phrases and technicalities of the laws and pay more attention to the humanitarian side in deciding wages for railroad employees . . . Walsh told the board that the wage matter was one far above the law and went down into the deepest moral questions, the structure of society, and even into the fundamental religion . . regardless of the law, the men must have a living wage."

Walsh's activities in behalf of the American Labor Movement were analyzed by author Maria Eucharia Meehan in her book, Frank P. Walsh and the American Labor Movement.

In 1931 Walsh was named chairman of the New York Power Authority.

Walsh served as the first legal counsel to the Amalgamated Association of Iron and Steel Workers, remaining in that role from 1918 until his death in 1939.

In 1936 Walsh was chairman of the Catholic Citizen's Committee for Ratification of the Federal Child Labor Law.

In 1941 the Walsh family donated the collected files of Walsh to the New York Public Library.

For a time, Walsh's secretary in New York was Sarah Lucille Turner, who had been one of the first women elected to the Missouri House of Representatives.

== Personal life ==
Walsh married Katherine O'Flaherty of Kansas City in 1891. They had nine children: Jerome, James, John Frederick, Frank P. Jr., Cecelia, Virginia, Frances, Sarah and Catherine.

Walsh died of a heart attack while walking in front of the New York County Courthouse in New York City on May 2, 1939. He was buried at Mount St. Mary's Cemetery in Kansas City, Missouri on May 6.
