= Sarah Anderson =

Sara Anderson or Sarah Anderson may refer to:

== People ==
- Sara Anderson Immerwahr (née Anderson; 1914–2008), American archaeologist
- Sarah Anderson (Minnesota politician) (born 1972), member of the Minnesota House of Representatives
- Sarah A. Anderson (1901–1992), member of the Pennsylvania House of Representatives
- Sarah E. Anderson (1853–1900), member of the Utah State Legislature
- Dame Sarah Lillian Anderson (1956–2025), British charity founder and entrepreneur, see 2026 New Year Honours
- Sarah Pia Anderson (born 1952), British television and theatre director
- Sari Anderson (née Sarah R. Anderson; born 1978), American multisport and endurance athlete
- Sarah Anderson (curler) (born 1995), American curler

== Fictional characters ==
- Sarah Anderson, a character in the 1987 American teen comedy film Adventures in Babysitting
- Sarah Andersen (Hollyoaks), a character on the British soap opera Hollyoaks

== Schools named after Sarah Anderson (1922–1981), American educator ==
- PS 9 Sarah Anderson School, an elementary school in Manhattan, New York City
- The Anderson School, a K-8 school for intellectually gifted children in New York City

== Other ==
- Sarah Anderson (ship)

== See also ==
- Sarah Andersen (born 1992), American cartoonist (Sarah's Scribbles)
