= New Limerick, Maine =

Town in Maine, United States

- Town
- Location of New Limerick, Maine
- Coordinates: 46°07′18″N 67°59′14″W
- Country: United States
- State: Maine
- County: Aroostook

Area
  - Total: 19.53 sq mi (50.58 km^{2})
  - Land: 18.44 sq mi (47.76 km^{2})
  - Water: 1.09 sq mi (2.82 km^{2})
- Elevation: 397 ft (121 m)

Population (2020)
  - Total: 574
  - Density: 31/sq mi (12/km^{2})
- Time zone: UTC-5 (Eastern (EST))
  - Summer (DST): UTC-4 (EDT)
- ZIP code: 04761
- Area code: 207
- FIPS code: 23-48960
- GNIS feature ID: 582620

New Limerick is a town in Aroostook County, Maine, United States. The population was 574 at the 2020 census. The town was settled in 1775 and incorporated on March 18, 1837, from New Limerick Plantation. It received its name from the fact that many of its settlers had previously lived in Limerick in York County at the southern end of the state, which in turn was probably named after the Irish city of Limerick.

== Geography ==
According to the United States Census Bureau, the town has a total area of 19.53 square miles (50.58 km^{2}), of which 18.44 square miles (47.76 km^{2}) is land and 1.09 square miles (2.82 km^{2}) is water.

=== Climate ===
This climatic region is typified by large seasonal temperature differences, with warm to hot (and often humid) summers and cold (sometimes severely cold) winters. According to the Köppen Climate Classification system, New Limerick has a humid continental climate, abbreviated "Dfb" on climate maps.

== Demographics ==
Historical population
| Census | Pop. | Note | %± |
|---|---|---|---|
| 1840 | 123 | | — |
| 1850 | 160 | | 30.1% |
| 1860 | 226 | | 41.3% |
| 1870 | 308 | | 36.3% |
| 1880 | 590 | | 91.6% |
| 1890 | 567 | | −3.9% |
| 1900 | 600 | | 5.8% |
| 1910 | 481 | | −19.8% |
| 1920 | 412 | | −14.3% |
| 1930 | 404 | | −1.9% |
| 1940 | 413 | | 2.2% |
| 1950 | 543 | | 31.5% |
| 1960 | 394 | | −27.4% |
| 1970 | 427 | | 8.4% |
| 1980 | 513 | | 20.1% |
| 1990 | 524 | | 2.1% |
| 2000 | 523 | | −0.2% |
| 2010 | 510 | | −2.5% |
| 2020 | 574 | | 12.5% |
U.S. Decennial Census

=== 2010 census ===
As of the census of 2010, there were 510 people, 241 households, and 154 families living in the town. The population density was 27.7 inhabitants per square mile (10.7/km^{2}). There were 407 housing units at an average density of 22.1 per square mile (8.5/km^{2}). The racial makeup of the town was 98.6% White, 0.4% African American, and 1.0% from two or more races. Hispanic or Latino of any race were 0.4% of the population.

There were 241 households, of which 18.7% had children under the age of 18 living with them, 53.5% were married couples living together, 5.4% had a female householder with no husband present, 5.0% had a male householder with no wife present, and 36.1% were non-families. 30.3% of all households were made up of individuals, and 14.5% had someone living alone who was 65 years of age or older. The average household size was 2.12 and the average family size was 2.59.

The median age in the town was 51.4 years. 15.1% of residents were under the age of 18; 5.7% were between the ages of 18 and 24; 16.1% were from 25 to 44; 40.6% were from 45 to 64; and 22.5% were 65 years of age or older. The gender makeup of the town was 47.8% male and 52.2% female.

=== 2000 census ===
As of the census of 2000, there were 523 people, 223 households, and 148 families living in the town. The population density was 28.3 inhabitants per square mile (10.9/km^{2}). There were 381 housing units at an average density of 20.6 per square mile (8.0/km^{2}). The racial makeup of the town was 99.81% White and 0.19% Native American.

There were 223 households, out of which 25.1% had children under the age of 18 living with them, 61.0% were married couples living together, 3.1% had a female householder with no husband present, and 33.2% were non-families. 25.6% of all households were made up of individuals, and 16.1% had someone living alone who was 65 years of age or older. The average household size was 2.35 and the average family size was 2.83.

In the town, the population was spread out, with 22.8% under the age of 18, 3.1% from 18 to 24, 26.2% from 25 to 44, 31.5% from 45 to 64, and 16.4% who were 65 years of age or older. The median age was 44 years. For every 100 females, there were 95.1 males. For every 100 females age 18 and over, there were 97.1 males.

The median income for a household in the town was $29,286, and the median income for a family was $36,250. Males had a median income of $30,588 versus $19,875 for females. The per capita income for the town was $14,940. About 10.3% of families and 10.4% of the population were below the poverty line, including 5.0% of those under age 18 and 22.7% of those age 65 or over.

== Notable person ==
- Dora Pinkham, born in New Limerick; in 1922, she became the first woman elected to the Maine Legislature
