= Malcolm Muir (publisher) =

American publisher

Malcolm Muir (1885 – January 30, 1979) was a U.S. magazine industrialist.

== Biography ==
Muir was born in New York City. He served as president of McGraw-Hill Publishing from 1928 to 1937. During his tenure as president, he helped create BusinessWeek magazine in 1929, the same year that McGraw-Hill stock was publicly traded for the first time.

The first issue of The Business Week, the original title of BusinessWeek, was published on September 7, 1929, a mere seven weeks before the stock market crash that signalled the beginning of the Great Depression. Muir is quoted as saying: "The Business Week will never be content to be a mere chronicle of events. It aims always to interpret their significance ... The Business Week always has a point of view, and usually a strong opinion, both of which it does not hesitate to express. And all the way through, we hope you will discover it is possible to write sanely and intelligently of business without being pompous or ponderous."

Muir served as the editor-in-chief and president of Newsweek magazine between 1937 and 1959. He was responsible for changing the four-year-old News-Week magazine's name to Newsweek and introducing international editions. He was named honorary chairman of the board when the Washington Post Company bought the magazine in 1961.

Muir died in 1979 in Manhattan from stomach disease, pneumonia and old age.

Sarah Lucille Turner, who had been one of the first women elected to the Missouri House of Representatives, became Muir's secretary while he was president of McGraw-Hill. After a hiatus she returned to work for him at Newsweek, eventually becoming the magazine's personnel director.
