= Lillian Frink =

American politician (1882–1974)

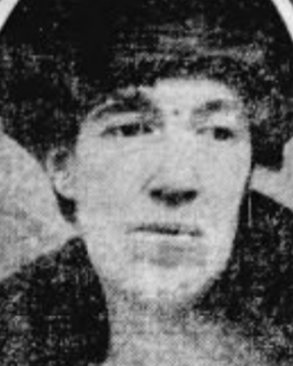

Member of the Connecticut House of Representatives from Canterbury
- In office 1921–1925
- Preceded by: Arthur C. Bennett; Edward Baker
- Succeeded by: Clinton E. Frink; Andrew T. J. Clark
- In office 1953–1959
- Preceded by: Nelson L. Carpenter; Charles Grab
- Succeeded by: Hans Hansen; Richard L. Trayner

Personal details
- Born: Lillian Mae Spalding; 1882 Brooklyn, Connecticut, U.S.
- Died: March 14, 1974 (aged 91) Plainfield, Connecticut, U.S.
- Party: Republican
- Spouse: Clinton E. Frink
- Relatives: Frank D. Spalding (brother)
- Education: Willimantic Normal School

Lillian Mae Frink (née Spalding; 1882 – March 14, 1974) was an American politician who served in the Connecticut House of Representatives from 1921 to 1925 and 1953 to 1959, representing the town of Canterbury as a Republican. She was among the first five women to serve in the Connecticut General Assembly, taking office in the first state legislative session following the ratification of the Nineteenth Amendment.

== Personal life and family ==
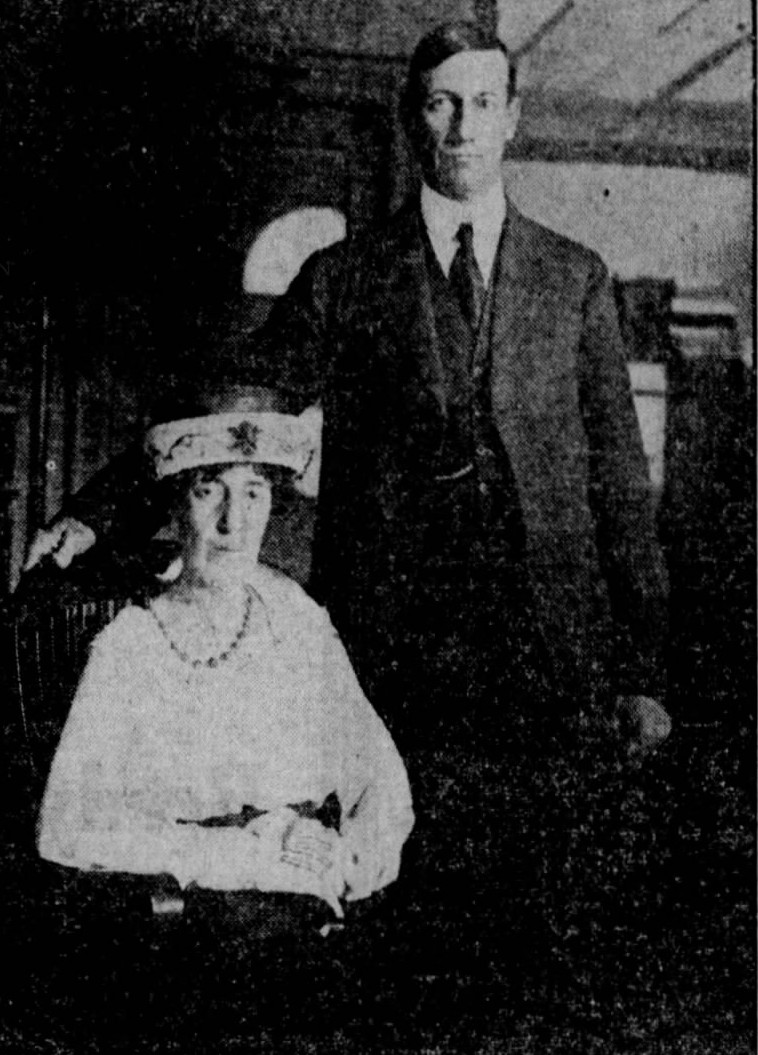
Lillian Frink and Frank Spalding

Frink was born in 1882 in Brooklyn, Connecticut, to parents Frank and Emma Spalding. She graduated from the Willimantic Normal School and worked as a schoolteacher in her early career. She was the sister of politician Frank D. Spalding, who would later serve alongside her in the Connecticut House of Representatives. Frink's husband, Clinton E. Frink, was also a state legislator. He represented Canterbury in the Connecticut House from 1925 to 1933, immediately following Lillian's first two terms.

Frink was a longtime resident of Canterbury. While serving in the legislature, she lived in the historic William Moore House in the area now known as the Canterbury Center Historic District. In 2018, the house burned down, and it was demolished in 2019.

In 1920, Clinton Frink purchased Hoxie's Store, a local business in Canterbury. Along with his brother-in-law, William Wright, he opened a new store, Frink & Wright's Merchandise, in the location. Wright and the Frinks operated the store until the mid-1940s, when it was sold to state legislator Sally Romanoff and her husband, William. The Romanoffs operated the store until 1953.

Frink died on March 14, 1974, in Plainfield, Connecticut. She was 91.

== Political career ==
Frink was elected to the Connecticut House of Representatives in 1920, the first election cycle in which women in Connecticut could vote for and hold state office, and was among the first five women to serve in the General Assembly. A Republican, she served two terms as one of two representatives from the town of Canterbury and did not run for reelection in 1924. She was succeeded by Clinton E. Frink and Andrew T. J. Clark. During her first term, Frink was a member of the Public Health and Safety Committee and clerk of the Legislative Expenses Committee.

In 1952, Frink was again elected to represent Canterbury in the Connecticut House, and she served three terms. She did not run for reelection in 1958 and was succeeded by fellow Republicans Hans Hansen and Richard L. Trayner.

Outside of her service in the House, Frink remained active in local politics and government. From 1923 to 1932, she worked as postmistress of Canterbury. From 1937 to 1960, she was Canterbury's town clerk. In 1941, she also served as treasurer. She was a member of the state and national Order of Women Legislators.

=== Political positions and legislation ===
In 1920, Frink commented that while she was not a suffragist, she had "the serious intent of proving that women can legislate honestly, fairly, and wisely" as a member of the House of Representatives. In 1953, she remarked that she had "never really thought [suffrage] was necessary until it came".

In 1955, Frink authored and introduced House Bill 1065, a bill intended to regulate the manufacture, sale, and transportation of realistic toy pistols in Connecticut. The bill sought to establish a fine of up to $100 for "any person who shall manufacture, distribute, transport, carry or sell toy pistols that are colored black, blue, silver or aluminum, or any person who shall paint toy pistols black, blue, silver or aluminum". J. & E. Stevens, then the second-largest business in Cromwell and one of the largest producers of toy pistols in the United States, was notably opposed to the bill, claiming that if the law were passed, the strain of making changes to their most popular products could force the plant to close and thus impact the jobs of 125 residents of Cromwell, Portland, and Middletown. The bill also faced significant local opposition from both Republican and Democratic politicians and organizations, and Frink withdrew the bill on February 16, 1955, shortly before it was scheduled to be heard by the General Assembly's Judiciary Committee.
