= Walter G. Alexander =

American politician & physician (1880–1953)

- Born: December 3, 1880; Lynchburg, Virginia, U.S.
- Died: February 5, 1953 (aged 72); Orange, New Jersey, U.S.
- Occupations: physician and politician
- Known for: first African American to serve in the New Jersey Legislature
- Political party: Republican
- Other political affiliations: Progressive (1912)

Walter Gilbert Alexander I (December 3, 1880 – February 5, 1953) was an American physician and Republican politician from New Jersey. He was president of the National Medical Association and the first African American to serve in the New Jersey Legislature.

== Early life and career ==
Alexander was born in Lynchburg, Virginia, in 1880, the son of former slaves. He attended public schools in Lynchburg and entered Lincoln University in Chester County, Pennsylvania in 1895 at the age of 14. He graduated in 1899 and then attended the Boston College of Physicians and Surgeons (now Tufts University School of Medicine), receiving his M.D. in 1903. After practicing medicine for one year in Kimball, West Virginia, he opened a practice in Orange, where he resided for the rest of his life.

From 1906 to 1912, Alexander served as vice president of the New Jersey National Medical Association, and in 1907 he organized the North Jersey Medical Society. He was an active member of the National Medical Association (NMA), the largest and oldest national organization representing African-American physicians in the United States. He assisted in the founding of the Journal of the National Medical Association in 1908. Dr. Alexander was a founding member of the Oranges and Maplewood Unit of the NAACP. This Unit was the first NAACP established in New Jersey. He served as general secretary of the NMA from 1912 to 1924 (and again from 1928 to 1932), as president from 1925 to 1926, and as chairman of the board of trustees from 1942 to 1944. He received the NMA's distinguished service award in 1944.

== Political career ==
Alexander became involved in Essex County politics, serving on the Republican County Committee in 1911. In 1912, he was a candidate for the New Jersey General Assembly on the Progressive Party ticket with Theodore Roosevelt, making him the first African American in the state to have a regular party endorsement for a legislative seat. In 1914, he was a candidate for City Commissioner of Orange, receiving the eleventh highest vote total in a field of 54 candidates. In 1919, Alexander was an unsuccessful candidate for the Assembly on Essex County's Republican League ticket.

In 1920, Alexander won election to the Assembly, on a twelve-person Republican slate in Essex County that also included the first two women elected to the New Jersey Legislature, Margaret B. Laird and Jennie C. Van Ness. In March 1921, Alexander was appointed to serve as acting Speaker of the Assembly while Speaker George S. Hobart was attending a National Guard investigation. It marked the first time that an African American had acted in this capacity, though an African American would not be elected to the speakership until 1974, when S. Howard Woodson was chosen for the position. He won re-election to the Assembly later in 1921.

Alexander was selected as alternate-at-large to the 1924 Republican National Convention. Four years later, the Republican State Committee selected him as one of seven delegates-at-large to the 1928 Republican National Convention.

== Later life ==
Alexander maintained close ties to his alma mater, Lincoln University, serving as graduate manager of athletics from 1920 to 1926, president of the General Alumni Association from 1931 to 1936, and member of the board of trustees in 1936. In 1939 the university awarded him an honorary degree of Doctor of Humane Letters.

On October 13, 1926, Alexander along with 12 other individuals, co-founded Alpha Alpha Lambda (ΑΑΛ), the first New Jersey chapter of the African-American fraternity Alpha Phi Alpha (ΑΦΑ).

He was appointed the president of the New Jersey Tuberculosis League. He was also a member of the state Public Health Council, the Committee on Health and Welfare under Governor Alfred E. Driscoll, and the medical advisory committee of the National Youth Administration. In 1939 he was the first African American admitted to membership in the New Jersey Public Health Association.

Alexander died in 1953 at his home in Orange at the age of 72, survived by his wife Lillian.

In 2007, Governor Jon Corzine signed a bill commemorating the achievements of Alexander, along with Hutchins F. Inge, the first African American to serve in the New Jersey Senate.

== See also ==
- List of African-American officeholders (1900–1959)
