= Ernst Balz =

German sculptor and soldier (1904–1945)

- Born: 24 February 1904; Forchtenberg, German Empire
- Died: 31 December 1945 (aged 41)

Ernst Balz (24 February 1904 – 31 December 1945) was a German sculptor. His work was part of the sculpture event in the art competition at the 1936 Summer Olympics.

== Life and career ==
Balz was born in Forchtenberg, Baden-Württemberg on 24 February 1904.

He began his studies at the art academy in Munich, and continued at the Kunstgewerbeschule in Berlin, where he was taught by his future father-in-law Wilhelm Gerstel. In 1934 he settled in Berlin as a freelance artist. He became known for his statues of young men, portrait busts and small sculptures.

He volunteered for military service at the start of the Second World War in 1939 and went missing-in-action in Romania in 1944. He was officially declared dead by the local court in Berlin-Zehlendorf on 27 April 1964. His official date of death was given as, 31 December 1945, with no place of death recorded.

== Personal life ==
He was married to fellow sculptor Doris Balz, having studied under her father Wilhelm Gerstel, and had four children. His daughter Doris Waschk-Balz is also a sculptor and medalist.
