= Jennie C. Van Ness =

American politician

Jennie Carolyn (Sullivan) Van Ness (August 27, 1879 – September 15, 1967) was a leader in the women's suffrage and Prohibition movements in New Jersey. She was one of the first two women to serve in the New Jersey Legislature, elected in 1920 as a Republican.

== Early life and career ==
Jennie Carolyn Sullivan was born in Chicago, Illinois, in 1879, the daughter of John and Caroline Sullivan. She married Frank W. Van Ness, a businessman, and they settled in East Orange, New Jersey, where they raised three daughters.

Van Ness worked as a substitute teacher at East Orange High School and was an active local civic organizer. She also joined the New Jersey Woman Suffrage Association (NJWSA), a group founded by Lucy Stone and other New Jersey suffragists in 1867. Van Ness ran the NJWSA's citizenship schools, which sought to educate women throughout the state in government and politics. In April 1920, when the NJWSA was reorganized as the New Jersey League of Women Voters, she was made a regional director and also chaired a board to draw up a state program on legislative issues.

== Legislative tenure ==
In September 1920, Van Ness was one of two women, along with Margaret B. Laird, designated by the Essex County Republican Party to run on the twelve-person slate for the New Jersey General Assembly. On announcing her candidacy, she was quoted by the Newark Evening News as saying,

My home is the center, but not the circumference of my life, just as it is the center, but not the circumference of the life of every right-living husband and father.

Van Ness and Laird won and became the first two women to serve in the state legislature. Also elected on the Essex County slate was Walter G. Alexander, the first African American to serve in the legislature.

During her single term in the Assembly, Van Ness served on the standing committees for Education and for Unfinished Business, and on the joint committees for the Industrial School for Girls, the School for Feeble Minded Children, and the State Library. She supported Republican legislation granting women equal privileges in government employment, as well as equal representation on party committees.

Van Ness was best known for her sponsorship of a prohibition enforcement bill, known as the Van Ness Act. Attorneys with the Anti-Saloon League helped to draw up the legislation, which was intended to reinforce the federal Volstead Act. The Van Ness Act assessed severe penalties on the sale and manufacture of alcoholic beverages and provided for the trial of offenders before a magistrate without jury:

Whenever a complaint is made before any magistrate that a person has violated one or more of the provisions of this act, it shall be the duty of such magistrate, and every such magistrate is hereby given full power and authority to issue his warrant so complained against, and, summarily, without a jury and without any pleadings, to try the person so arrested and brought before him, and to determine and adjudge his guilt or innocence.

Introduced in early 1921, the act passed the Republican-controlled legislature over the veto of Governor Edward I. Edwards and became law. In the 1921 legislative election, "wet" (anti-Prohibition) candidates strenuously opposed the Van Ness Act as a violation of constitutional and personal liberties. Anti-Prohibition forces also made a special drive to defeat Van Ness in her Essex County race. She was the only Republican candidate on the Essex County slate to fail to be reelected in November 1921.

The Van Ness Act was on the books for less than a year, as the New Jersey Court of Errors and Appeals ruled it unconstitutional in February 1922.

== Later life ==
After her defeat Van Ness continued to be active in the New Jersey Women's Republican Club, serving as the club's legislative chair in 1926. In 1927, she looked back on the first wave of suffragists to seek political office:

It's not that we want the political jobs themselves, but they seem to be the only language the men understand. We don't really want these $200 a year jobs. But the average man doesn't understand working for a cause.

According to Past and Promise: Lives of New Jersey Women, "after 1931 no reference to Van Ness appears in the public record." She died on September 15, 1967, in Wilmington, North Carolina.
