= Mary L. R. Farnum =

Mary Louise Rolfe Farnum (February 10, 1870 – February 9, 1965) was an American physician and politician who was one of the first two women to serve in the New Hampshire House of Representatives.

== Early life ==
Farnum was born to Charles M. and Maria (Morrison) Rolfe on February 10, 1870, in Boscawen, New Hampshire. She was a descendant of Henry Rolfe, one of the original settlers of Concord, New Hampshire. She graduated from Concord High School in 1888 and taught for three years in the schools of Boscawen and Penacook. On September 15, 1892, she married Samuel H. Farnum of Penacook. He died on June 13, 1893, and she subsequently took up the study of medicine.

== Medicine ==
Farnum graduated from the Boston University School of Medicine in 1900. After working at a dispensary in Boston and a women's hospital in Brooklyn, Farnum established a practice in Hartford, Connecticut. She eventually returned to Penacook to be closer to her family and practiced in the village for some time. She was also active in town affairs as a member of the school board, head of the town's Red Cross organization, and treasurer of the Congregational church. Following her mother's death, she gave up her medical practice to care for her father.

== Politics ==
Shortly after the ratification of the Nineteenth Amendment to the United States Constitution granted women suffrage, Farnum ran for Boscawen's seat in the New Hampshire House of Representatives. Farnum, a Democrat, won by a 30-vote margin in the same election where Boscawen voted nearly 3 to 1 in favor of Republican presidential candidate Warren G. Harding. She served on the Public Health and Normal School committees. She delivered her maiden speech on February 23, 1921. It was only twelve words and informed the legislature that the normal school committee was unanimously against the proposed state teacher's college in Manchester. Despite its brevity, Farnum's remarks "spelled death for the measure" according to The Lewiston Daily Sun. She also spoke before the House in favor of a factory inspection bill. She did not run for reelection in 1922.
