= Mary Gant =

American politician (born 1936)

Mary L. Jones Gant

Member of the Missouri Senate from the 9th district
- In office 1973–1981

Personal details
- Born: July 14, 1936 (age 90) Kansas City, Missouri, U.S.
- Party: Democratic
- Spouse(s): Bill Dearing; Ronald A. Gant; Peter Newquist
- Children: 3 (2 sons, 1 daughter)
- Occupation: politician

Mary L. Jones Gant (born July 14, 1936) is an American politician who became the first woman elected to the Missouri Senate. She was born in Kansas City, Missouri. In 1972, after three terms in the Missouri House, she was elected to the state senate with over 70% of the vote. Although she belonged to the Democratic Party, she was against the Equal Rights Amendment and later endorsed Republican Kit Bond for Governor of Missouri over the Democratic incumbent Joseph P. Teasdale. She lost re-election to Lee Swinton Missouri's first African-American state senator from the Kansas City Area. In 1981, Governor Bond appointed her as chair of the State Board of Mediation. She held this position for 13 years.

Her husband died February 1, 2019, in Jefferson City, Missouri, at age 96. He and Mary Gant were married on April 17, 1979, in San Benito, Texas, and had been married for over 40 years. He had served as a torpedo bomber pilot during World War II and had worked as a special agent for the FBI.

== See also ==
- Mellcene Thurman Smith and Sarah Lucille Turner, first women elected to the Missouri House of Representatives, in 1922
