= Margaret B. Laird =

American politician

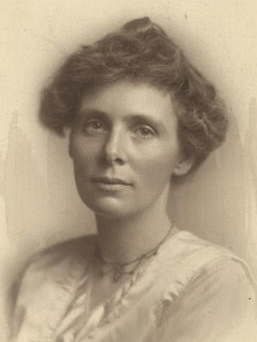
- Born: 1871
- Died: November 29, 1968; Neptune Township, New Jersey
- Occupations: New Jersey Legislature; nurse
- Known for: women's suffrage
- Spouse: Reginald M. Laird

Margaret Brydon Laird (1871 - November 29, 1968) was a leader in the women's suffrage movement in New Jersey. She was one of the first two women to serve in the New Jersey Legislature, elected in 1920 as a Republican.

== Life ==
Laird trained as a nurse in Newark, New Jersey, graduating from Newark City Hospital (now The University Hospital) in 1895. She married Reginald M. Laird, a druggist from Newark, and they had two children.

Laird became actively involved in women's suffrage organizations. She served as vice president of the Women's Political Union, chair of the Newark chapter of the National Woman Suffrage Association, state treasurer of the National Woman's Party, and organizer of the Newark Women's Republican Club. She campaigned for the passage of the Nineteenth Amendment, which secured women's suffrage in 1920.

In 1920, Laird was one of two women, along with Jennie C. Van Ness, designated by the Essex County Republican Party to run on the twelve-person slate for the New Jersey General Assembly. Laird and Van Ness won, and became the first two women to serve in the state legislature. Also elected on the Essex County slate was Walter G. Alexander, the first African American to serve in the legislature.

Laird served two terms in the Assembly. She was active in establishing the state's juvenile court law, and she supported legislation for equal salaries for women employed by the state government. She declined to run for a third term because of the Assembly's late hours.

Laird remained active in local politics, serving as president of the Newark Women's Republican Club from 1926 to 1932. She died in 1968 at the age of 97, in a nursing home in Neptune, New Jersey.
