= Dora Pinkham =

American politician

Member of the Maine Senate from the 16th district
- In office January 5, 1927 – January 7, 1931 Serving with F. W. Mitchell and W. H. Bragdon
- Preceded by: Allen C. T. Wilson
- Succeeded by: Herbert W. Kitchen
- Constituency: Aroostook County

Member of the Maine House of Representatives from the Fort Kent and Wallagrass district
- In office January 3, 1923 – January 7, 1925
- Preceded by: William J. Audibert
- Succeeded by: William J. Audibert

Personal details
- Born: Dora Julia Bradbury; September 27, 1891 New Limerick, Maine, U.S.
- Died: November 19, 1941 (aged 50)
- Party: Republican
- Spouse: Niles Pinkham (m. 1917)
- Education: Mount Holyoke College (BA); Columbia University (MA)

Dora Julia Bradbury Pinkham (September 27, 1891 — November 19, 1941) was an American politician. A Republican, Pinkham was first woman elected to the Maine Legislature in 1922. She served in both the Maine House of Representatives and Maine Senate.

== Early life ==
Dora Bradbury was born September 27, 1891, in New Limerick, Maine. Her parents were Lester and Dora (Small) Bradbury. The family moved to Fort Kent in 1892. Bradbury attended grade school in Fort Kent, and then Houlton High School in Houlton.

Bradbury graduated from Mount Holyoke College in 1913, and earned a master's degree from Columbia University in 1914. She then worked as a teacher, civil servant, and bookkeeper. In 1917, Bradbury married Fort Kent businessman Niles Pinkham.

== Political career ==
Pinkham ran in the 1922 election, and defeated two-term Democrat William J. Audibert. Pinkham was the only one elected of nine women who ran for the legislature that year. She began serving in the Maine House of Representatives on January 3, 1923. Pinkham, a Protestant, represented an overwhelmingly Catholic region of Maine that bordered on the Canadian province of Quebec.

In the legislature, Pinkham served on the Joint Committee for Public Health, the Maine Publicity Committee, the Joint Committee for Education, and on several ad hoc committees. Of the six bills she sponsored in the Maine House of Representatives, five were passed. Pinkham ran for re-election in 1924 and lost to the previous incumbent William J. Audibert.

In 1926, Pinkham was elected to the Maine Senate. That year, both Pinkham and Katherine Allen became the first women to serve in the Maine Senate. Pinkham was re-elected to the Senate in 1928.

As a senator, Pinkham held a chair on the Joint Standing Committees on Education and Public Health, and served on the Joint Standing Committees on State Prisons and Interior Waters, the Senate Committee on Bills in Second Reading, and on numerous special and ad hoc committees.

== Later life ==
After leaving the Senate, Pinkham served as special secretary to Maine Governor William Tudor Gardiner. From 1932 to 1935, she was a member of a state advisory council on health and welfare. Pinkham remained active in Republican politics in Maine. Pinkham died on November 19, 1941.
