= May M. Van Wye =

American politician

May Martin Van Wye

Member of the Ohio Senate from the Hamilton County district
- In office January 1922-December 1928

Member of the Ohio House of Representatives from the Hamilton County district
- In office January 1928-December 1930

Personal details
- Born: December 31, 1878 Brooklyn, New York
- Died: August 26, 1968 (aged 89) Cincinnati, Ohio
- Party: Republican

May Martin Van Wye (1878–1968) was a member of the Ohio House of Representatives and the Ohio Senate. She was one of the first six women elected into the Ohio General Assembly in 1922. In 1962, she published her first novel, Eve's Tower, which is loosely based on her experiences as a female state senator.

Van Wye was born May Martin on December 31, 1878, in Brooklyn, New York to Lewis E. Martin and Ella M. Seaman. She married Benjamin C. Van Wye (1867–1940), who became professor of speech at the University of Cincinnati. She died August 26, 1968, in Cincinnati, Ohio.
