= Lee Swinton =

American politician (1922–1994)

Member of the Missouri Senate

Lee Vertis Swinton (August 9, 1922 – July 9, 1994) was an American politician who became the first African-American to serve in the Missouri Senate from the Kansas City area. He was a Democrat. He was a former Kansas City NAACP president.
