= Belz (crater) =

Crater on Mars

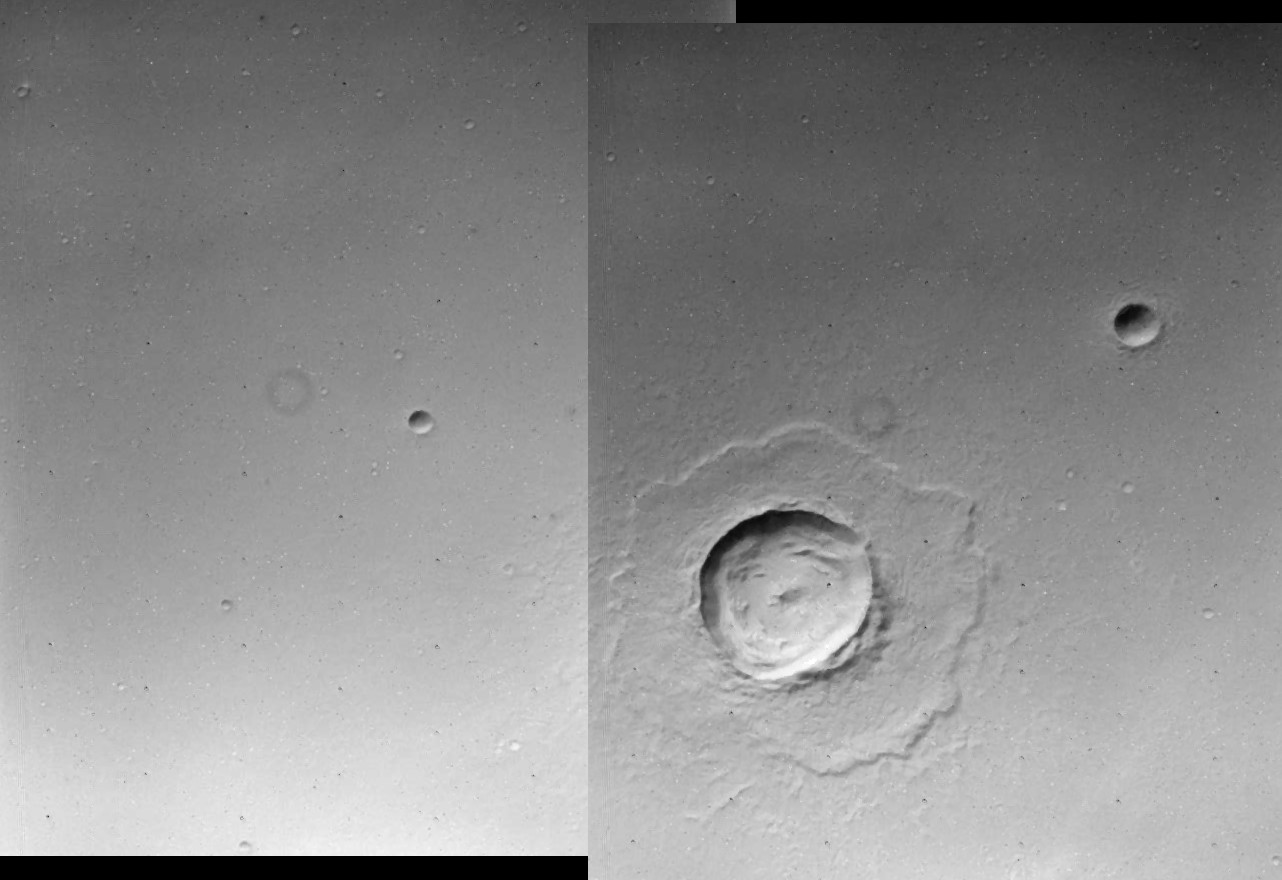
- Viking Orbiter mosaic
- Planet: Mars
- Coordinates: 21.57°N 43.23°W
- Quadrangle: Oxia Palus
- Diameter: 10.21 km (6.34 mi)
- Eponym: Belz, Ukraine

Belz is an impact crater in the Oxia Palus quadrangle of Mars. It was named after the city of Belz, Lviv Oblast, Ukraine, in 1976.

Belz is an example of a rampart crater.

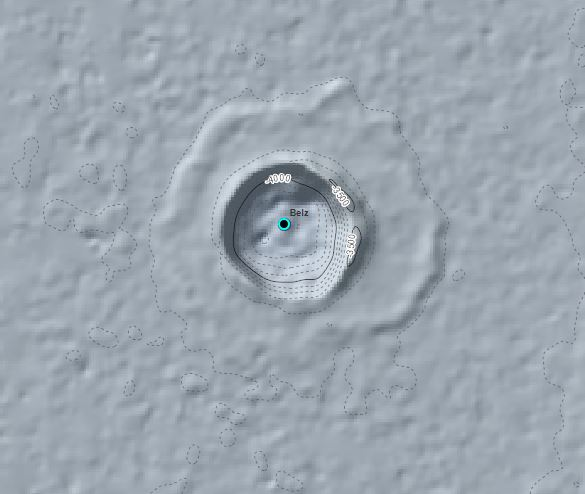
A topographic representation of Belz crater created by RedMapper.
