= Nettie McKenzie Clapp =

American politician

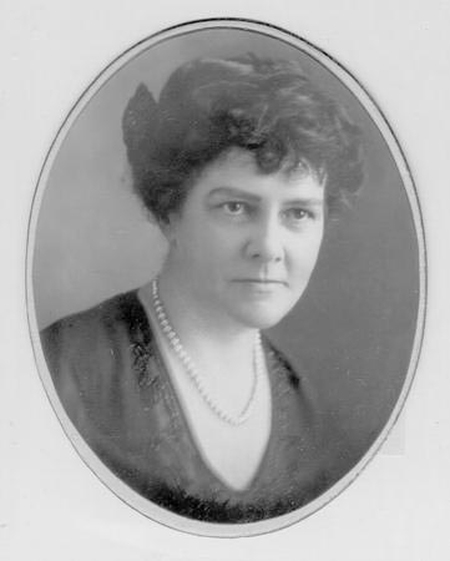

Member of the Ohio House of Representatives from the 94th district
- In office January 1922 – December 1930

Personal details
- Born: August 22, 1868 Cincinnati, Ohio
- Died: July 30, 1935 (aged 66) Cleveland, Ohio
- Party: Republican
- Spouse: Harold T. Clapp

Nettie McKenzie Clapp (August 22, 1868 – July 30, 1935) was a member of the Ohio House of Representatives. In 1922 she became one of the first women elected to the Ohio General Assembly. Clapp was the first woman legislator to sponsor a bill in the Ohio General Assembly and the first woman to serve on the Republican National Convention Executive Committee in 1924.

Clapp served four consecutive terms in the Ohio Legislature from 1922 to 1930 representing Cuyahoga County.
