= Eureka Forbes (politician) =

American politician

Eureka B. Forbes

Member of the Hawaii Senate
- In office 1966–1974

Member of the Hawaii House of Representatives
- In office 1959–1966

Personal details
- Born: Eureka Bernice Barnum; October 17, 1904 Fort Worth, Texas, U.S.
- Died: September 15, 1985 (aged 80) Honolulu, Hawaii, U.S.
- Party: Republican
- Spouse: Frederick B. Forbes (m. 1932)
- Children: 3
- Education: University of California at Los Angeles; University of Hawaii
- Profession: Teacher

Eureka Bernice Forbes (née Barnum; October 17, 1904 – September 15, 1985) was an American politician from the state of Hawaii. She was one of the first women elected to the Hawaii House of Representatives after statehood in 1959.

== Biography ==
=== Early life and education ===
Forbes was born Fort Worth, Texas in 1904. Forbes earned a bachelor of arts degree from the University of California at Los Angeles (UCLA), and her early career was spent as a teacher in Los Angeles where she taught elementary school from 1924 to 1930. She married Frederick B. Forbes in June 1932 and moved to Hawaii shortly afterwards where her husband worked. They had three children.

=== Teaching career ===
Forbes continued her career as a teacher in Hawaii, owning a nursery school and kindergarten and teaching at Kamehameha Schools as well as a high school and girls' school. Forbes later attended the University of Hawaii and earned a master's degree, also serving as its musical director. Residing in Manoa, she also owned a dress shop.

=== As part of the Hawaii House of Representatives ===
In 1959, Forbes was elected to the Hawaii House of Representatives as a Republican to represent Manoa. She was one of the first two women to be elected to the House following statehood, alongside Dorothy L. Devereux. In the 1950s, she was the only female member on the City Charter Commission, and she also served on the Hawaii Territorial Commission and various commissions for children and youth. A self-described political moderate, she served in the House until 1966, when she was elected to the Hawaii Senate to represent Manoa and Waikiki, until her retirement in 1974. During that time, she was also instrumental in the founding of Hawaii Pacific College. She later received various alumni-related honors from the University of Hawaii, also serving as president of its alumni association. In 1970, she was named Hawaii's Mother of the Year. Forbes died in a Honolulu nursing home, where she resided for the last decade of her life, on September 15, 1985.
