= Sarah Lucille Turner =

American politician (1898–1972)

Member of the Missouri House of Representatives from the 6th district
- In office 1922–1924

Sarah Lucille Turner, later known as Sarah Turner Jepson (March 28, 1898 – April 12, 1972), was a Missouri lawyer and politician who later went on to a career at Newsweek. With Mellcene Thurman Smith, she was one of the first two women elected to the Missouri General Assembly, although Smith joked that she was first woman representative because representatives were sworn in by alphabetical order.

== Life and career ==
Turner was a native of Centralia, Illinois, who moved with her family to Kansas City, Missouri, when she was ten. A 1915 honors graduate of Northeast High School, she took a job during the day for Havens Structural Steel Company and took night classes at the Kansas City School of Law she graduated in 1922 and began work with the law firm of Hagerman & Jost. She and Smith were both elected a few months after law school graduation, in 1922, and both were Democrats. Otherwise, they were quite different; Turner was unmarried, unlike Smith, and was the youngest member of the House at the time of her service.

Turner had not planned to seek office, but changed her mind when some of the men in her law school classes voiced objections to the idea of women serving as office-holders. Her parents objected to her decision to run. She was the first woman to preside over the Missouri House of Representatives, on March 16, 1923. Committees on which she served included Civil and Criminal Procedure, Constitution Amendments and Criminal Jurisprudence, and University and School of Mines and she chaired the Children's Code Committee. She favored better schools and the increase of teachers' pay. She expressed interest in legislation affecting women and children. Five of her bills were passed, and she introduced others, pertaining to children's employment, increasing appropriations for the state women's reformatory, and licensing children's boarding homes. She also introduced the legislation declaring the hawthorn as the state flower. Smith and Turner both lost their bids for re-election in 1924. During her term Turner represented the 6th District, consisting of part of Jackson County, in the Legislature. Besides her political career, Turner was active in historic preservation as well; she is said to have been part of the effort to save the George Caleb Bingham House and Huston Tavern in Arrow Rock, both today part of Arrow Rock State Historic Site.

After her defeat Turner moved, first to New York City, where she practiced law, served as secretary to attorney Frank P. Walsh, and worked as secretary for Malcolm Muir, vice-president of McGraw-Hill. Later she moved to Washington, D.C. to work for Hugh S. Johnson, who directed the National Recovery Act. In 1932 she married a real estate agent, Walter C. Jepson, a veteran of the United States Air Force who had served in both World Wars. When Muir became the publisher of Newsweek she returned to her position as his secretary; eventually she became the magazine's personnel manager, from which position she retired at 65. She and her husband then moved to Southern Pines, North Carolina, where she died of cancer.

A small collection of material related to Turner's life and career is held by the Missouri Valley Special Collections unit of the Kansas City Public Library.

== See also ==
- Mary Gant, first woman elected to the Missouri State Senate, in 1979
