= Mary C. Baltz =

American soil scientist (1923 – 2011)

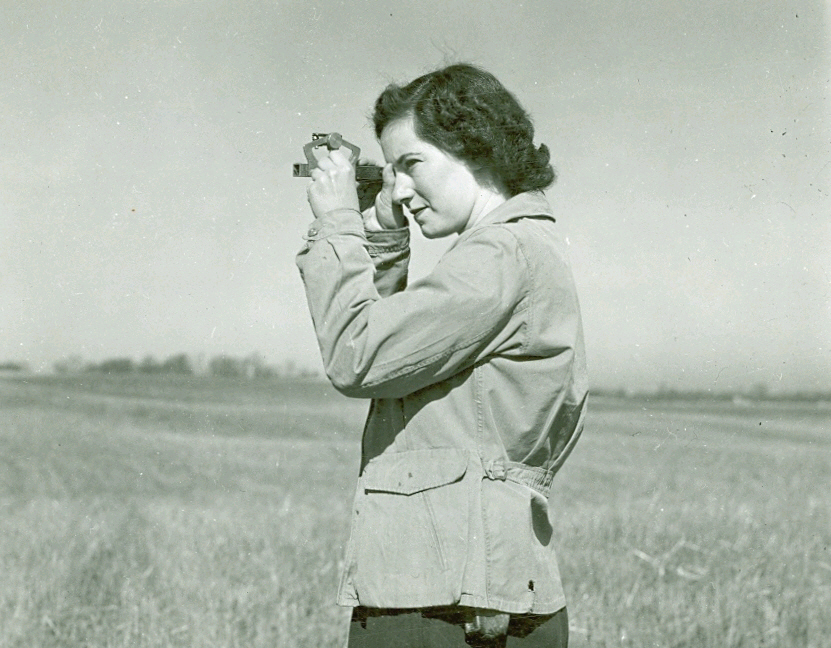
- Baltz as a Survey Party Chief in Canastota, New York
- Born: 1923; United States
- Died: 2011 (aged 87–88); Sedona, Arizona
- Other name: Mary Baltz Tyler
- Education: Cornell University
- Occupation: Soil scientist
- Known for: first woman soil scientist officially assigned in the field for the American Soil Conservation Service
- Scientific career
- Workplaces: Soil Conservation Service

Mary C. Baltz (1923 – September 2011) was an American soil scientist.

== Career ==
Mary Baltz was the first woman soil scientist officially assigned in the field for the Soil Conservation Service.

After graduating from Cornell University, Baltz joined the soil survey as a Junior Soil Surveyor in 1946 and later became a Survey Party Chief.

Labor shortages during World War II gave her the opportunity to work in a job that, up to that time, had been reserved for men. By 1951, Baltz was responsible for soil mapping on farms in Madison, Oneida and Lewis counties in the state of New York, and was later assigned the task of map measurement for the entire state. The work was done by cutting out the soil map delineations on copies of the field sheets and then weighing the areas with the same label. The weight was later converted to acres.

Baltz hired the team of women to work with her in the winter months.

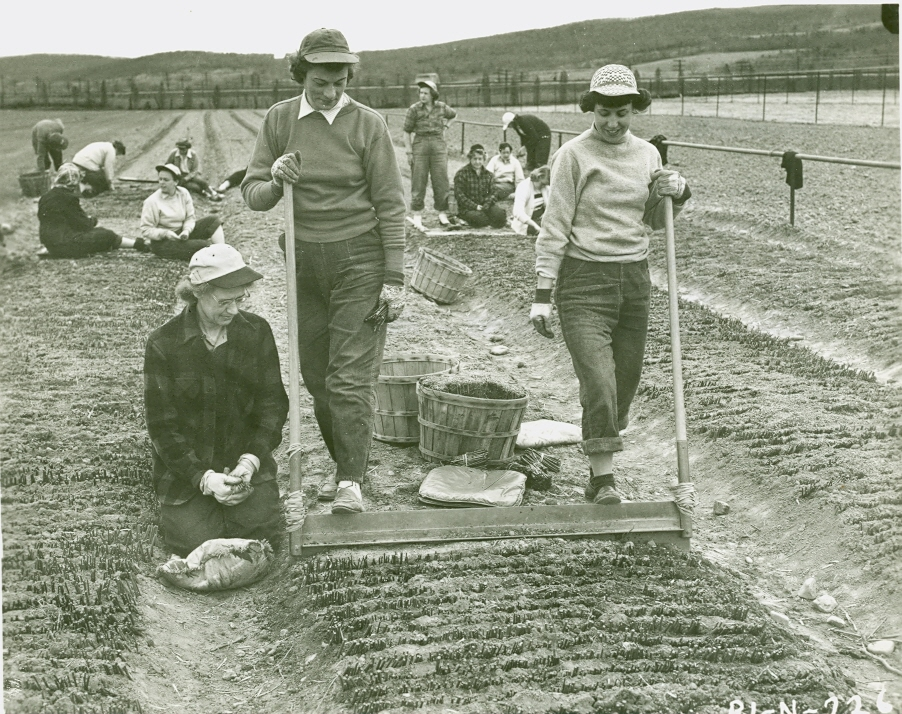
Team of women scientists hired by Mary Baltz

She worked for the SCS until the 1960s.

== Trivia ==
Mary Baltz was mentioned in a Forgotten Superheroes of Science section of The Skeptics' Guide to the Universe podcast, episode #633.

== See also ==
- NRCS New York Photo Gallery
