= Mellcene Thurman Smith =

American politician (1871–1957)

Member of the Missouri House of Representatives from the Second District of St. Louis County district
- In office 1922–1924

Personal details
- Born: November 13, 1871 Buchanan County, Missouri, United States
- Died: June 21, 1957 (aged 85) St. Louis, Missouri, United States
- Spouse: Edward T. Smith (died 1964)
- Parents: John William Thurman (father); Cecelia Marion Thurman (mother)

Mellcene Thurman Smith (November 13, 1871 – June 21, 1957) was one of the first women elected to the Missouri House of Representatives.

== Early life and education ==
Smith was born to John William and Cecelia Marion Thurman in Buchanan County, Missouri. She went to school in St. Joseph and Kansas City. Smith intended to have a career on-stage as a lyric soprano and studied voice. She married Edward T. Smith of St. Louis, where she moved and worked with him as secretary-treasurer at the family-owned St. Louis Law Print Company. She participated in a number of civic, historical, and political organizations, including the League of Women Voters as president of the University City League, Daughters of the American Revolution, the Women's Democratic State Committee, Daughters of the American Colonists, and U.S. Daughters of 1812. Smith was also an active member of the Christian Church and related organizations. She volunteered for the American Red Cross, worked to establish local libraries, and supported prohibition and women's suffrage.

== Politics ==
In 1920, Smith was a delegate to the Democratic state convention. Following pressure from the St. Louis League of Women Voters, she ran unopposed in the 1922 Democratic primary. Despite strong Republican opposition, she was elected in November 1922 on the Clean Election League ticket for the Second District of St. Louis County. She was aided in her electoral efforts by support from the League of Women Voters. She was one of the first two women elected to the Missouri General Assembly along with Sarah Lucille Turner, although Smith joked that she was first because representatives were sworn in by alphabetical order. Upon her election, Smith described her intent while in Jefferson City: "I do not intend to drape my feet over the top of a desk in the Capitol building. And I am determined not to spatter the walls of the place with tobacco juice." Her husband was unimpressed with her new workplace, saying, when he visited her there: "And this is what you left your home for?"

She sponsored eleven bills to improve St. Louis County government, six of which became laws, including one mandating voter registration in St. Louis County. She served on the Banks and Banking, Children's Code, and Eleemosynary Committees, and also chaired the Committee on State Libraries.

== Later life and death ==
Although she sought reelection in 1924, Smith was defeated. She returned to her civic involvement and pursued her genealogy hobby. She served as president of the St. Louis Law Printing Company following her husband's death in 1954. She died in St. Louis of cancer.

== See also ==
- Mary Gant, first woman elected to the Missouri State Senate, in 1979
