= Katherine Allen (Maine politician) =

American politician (1874 – 1953)

- Born: July 27, 1874; Hampden, Maine
- Died: November 27, 1953 (aged 79); Los Angeles, California
- Education: Hampden Academy
- Known for: First female senator in Maine
- Political party: Republican
- Spouse: Edward Allen

Katherine C. Allen (July 27, 1874 – November 27, 1953) was an American politician and farmer from Maine. A Republican, Allen resided in Hampden, Maine, and represented Penobscot County in the Maine Senate. In January 1927, Allen became one of the first two women sworn-in as members of the Maine Senate, with the other being Dora Pinkham. Four other women were elected to the Maine House of Representatives in the same election. In 2007, Allen and the other early women legislators were honored with the passage of a joint resolution of the Maine House of Representatives.

Allen was born and raised in Hampden, Maine, to parents Jesse and Caroline Arey. She graduated from Hampden Academy. As of 1926, she was a stock farmer who sold her products in nearby Bangor. She was also a member of the International Association of Rebekah Assemblies and the Bangor Business and Professional Women's Club.

Allen died on November 27, 1953, while visiting her brother in Los Angeles.
