= Eurithe LaBarthe =

American politician

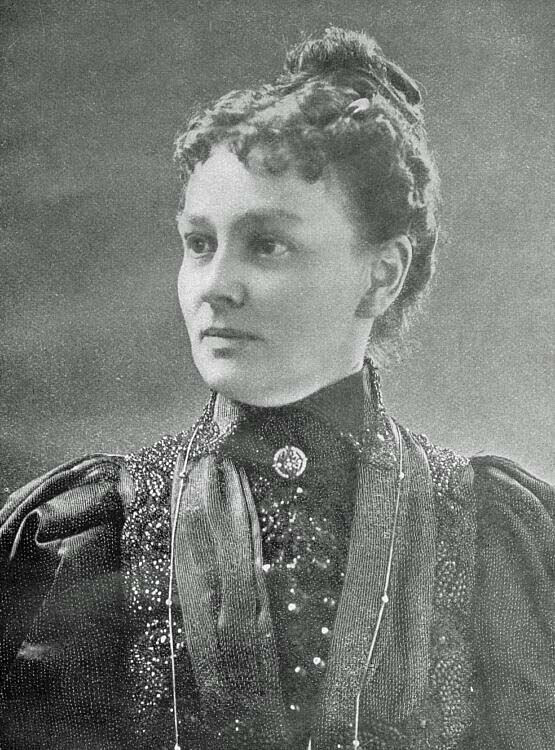
Eurithe LaBarthe

Eurithe K. LaBarthe (1845 in Peoria, Illinois–November 22, 1910 in Salt Lake City, Utah) was an American teacher and principal who served as a state legislator in Utah. She was a Democrat who lived in Salt Lake City. She wrote the high hat law which required women to remove their hats at public venues, so views would not be obstructed, or face a fine. She proposed a curfew for children. She was an organizer of the Utah State Historical Society.

LaBarthe née Ramsey was born in Peoria, Illinois in 1845. She was not Mormon. She was elected to the Utah House of Representatives in 1896, two years after White women won the right to vote in Utah in 1894.
