= Sarah McCune Gallaher =

American politician

Member of the Pennsylvania House of Representatives
- In office 1923–1924

Personal details
- Born: June 8, 1864 New Washington, Pennsylvania, U.S.
- Died: July 23, 1964 (aged 100) Spangler, Pennsylvania, U.S.
- Party: Republican
- Education: Indiana University of Pennsylvania; Cornell University; Oxford University; Université de Paris; University of Pennsylvania
- Profession: Educator

Sarah McCune Gallaher (June 8, 1864 – July 23, 1964) was an American politician from the state of Pennsylvania. She was one of the first women elected to the Pennsylvania House of Representatives in 1923, alongside Alice Bentley, Rosa de Young, Helen Grimes, Sarah Gertrude MacKinney, Lillie Pitts, Martha Speiser, and Martha Thomas. A Republican, she served a single term, until 1924.

Gallaher was born in New Washington, Pennsylvania and attended Indiana University of Pennsylvania where she earned her bachelor's and master's degrees. She later attended Cornell University, earning a Bachelor of Philosophy degree. Gallaher also received education from Oxford University, the Université de Paris, and University of Pennsylvania and was an educator by career. She was the proprietor (along with her sister Ada) and principal of Hallesen Place at Ebensburg Elementary Boarding School from 1904 to 1942 and also established a boarding school in Puerto Rico. Gallaher was also noted as a historian and authority on George Washington, Benjamin Franklin and William Penn. She died in Spangler, Pennsylvania, just over a month after her 100th birthday, in 1964.
