= Dorothy L. Devereux =

American politician

Member of the Hawaii House of Representatives for the 15th district
- In office 1958–1972

Personal details
- Born: Dorothy Louise Nelson; November 9, 1911 Spokane, Washington, U.S.
- Died: January 15, 1994 (aged 82) Honolulu, Hawaii, U.S.
- Party: Republican
- Spouse: John W. Devereux (m. 1934; died 1968)
- Children: 4
- Education: California Lutheran School of Nursing
- Profession: Nurse

Dorothy Louise Devereux (née Nelson; November 9, 1911 – January 15, 1994) was an American politician from the state of Hawaii. She was one of the first women elected to the Hawaii House of Representatives after statehood in 1959.

Devereux was a native of Spokane, Washington, the daughter of John and Olive (née Davis) Nelson. A registered nurse by profession, she received her nursing education at the California Lutheran School of Nursing in Los Angeles and also did postgraduate work at Chicago Lying-in Hospital. She resided in Chicago, working in the public health sector until the around 1935, when she moved to Hawaii. She married John William Devereux in 1934 and had four children. After moving to Hawaii, she served on the Governor's Committee on Employment of the Handicapped, Conference on Education, Hawaii School Survey, as president of the Hawaii Parent-Teacher's Congress and on the Governor's Advisory Committee on Vocational Rehabilitation.

In 1958, Devereux was elected to the Hawaii Territorial House of Representatives as a Republican. She was elected once again after statehood in 1959 to represent the 15th district, Manoa-Waikiki. Alongside Eureka Forbes, she was one of the first two women to be elected to the Hawaii House of Representatives after statehood in 1995. She served until 1972. Later, Devereux was also a founding member of the Hawaii Crippled Children's Society as well as the Sultan Foundation Nursery School. Devereux died at a hospital in Honolulu on January 15, 1994. Her husband predeceased her in 1968.
