= Arcada Balz =

American politician

Member of the Indiana State Senate
- In office 1943–1950

Personal details
- Born: Arcada Campbell Stark; December 31, 1879 Bloomington, Indiana, U.S.
- Died: August 18, 1973 (aged 93) Orlando, Florida, U.S.
- Party: Republican
- Spouse: Frederick C. Balz
- Profession: Teacher

Arcada Stark Balz (December 31, 1879 – August 18, 1973) was an American educator, clubwoman, and politician in the state of Indiana who became the first woman elected to the Indiana Senate, serving two consecutive four-year terms from 1943 to 1950 and representing Johnson and Marion Counties. Prior to entering politics, Balz was a teacher in the Indianapolis public schools and a leader in the woman's club movement in the state. Balz was the president of the Indiana Federation of Women's Clubs from 1935 to 1937. In addition, she served as president of the New Harmony Memorial Commission from 1939 to 1947.

== Early life and education ==
Arcada Campbell Stark was born on December 31, 1879, on a farm near Bloomington, Indiana, to Mary LeFevre (Weaver) and James Norbourn Stark. During her youth, the Stark family lived in Colorado and Kansas before moving to Indianapolis.

Stark attended Indianapolis's Emmerich Manual High School and was a graduate of Indianapolis Normal College (which later became a part of Butler University) and Indiana University's Extension Division.

== Marriage and family ==
Arcada Stark was married to Frederick C. Balz, the owner of the Star Millinery Company of Indianapolis.

== Career ==
=== Educator and clubwoman ===
Balz, a longtime resident of Indianapolis, began her career as a teacher prior to her marriage in the Indianapolis public schools, where she taught history, art, and literature to junior high school students. She also became active in the woman's club movement as a member of the Woman's Department Club of Indianapolis, where she chaired its literature, program, and applied education committees. In addition, she served as program chair, vice president, and president of the 7th District of the Indiana Federation of Women's Clubs, as well as chairperson of the press and publicity department, then first vice president, and from 1935 to 1937 as the state president of the Indiana Federation of Women's Clubs (later shortened to the Indiana Federal of Clubs).

During Balz's tenure as state president of the Indiana Federal of Clubs, her home district raised $8,000 to purchase radium for a free cancer clinic at Indianapolis City Hospital and helped to develop orchestra programs in city schools. She also recommended that the IFC establish a forestation project in collaboration with the Indiana state government. She also began planning for the publication of History of the Indiana Federation of Clubs (1939). In addition to her work with the IFC, Balz served as a director from Indiana on the advisory board of the General Federation of Women's Clubs, and chaired the program committee for the GFWC's annual meeting in San Francisco, California, in 1939. Balz was involved in other civic affairs such as the Indiana State Advisory Public Health Council in 1937, the Indiana Division of the Federal Writers Project, and an appointment to the Governor's Safety Council under the McNutt administration.

=== Politician ===
Balz's political activities began in the late 1930s after she suggested establishing a New Harmony Memorial the preserve the historic community of New Harmony, Indiana. Governor M. Clifford Townsend appointed Balz to the New Harmony Memorial Commission, where she served as its president from 1939 to 1947.

In November 1942, Balz became the first woman elected to the Indiana Senate, where she served two consecutive four-year terms from 1943 to 1950 representing Johnson and Marion Counties. Balz served on the Committee on Benevolent Institutions and in the 1947 session of the Indiana General Assembly, she chaired the Senate Committee on Public Health. As a women's rights advocate, Balz supported regulation of women's working hours and wages. Her other legislative interests included licensing nursing home care, efforts to improve school attendance, and establishing a merit system for state employees.

== Death and legacy ==
Balz remained in Indianapolis after leaving the state legislature in 1950. She moved to Orlando, Florida, in 1969, and died there on August 18, 1973, at the age of 93. Her remains are Interred at Crown Hill Cemetery in Indianapolis, Indiana.

Balz lead the way for other women elected to serve in Indiana Senate. As of July 25, 2019, Indiana women held a total of 36 seats (24 percent) of the 150 seats in the state legislature, slightly lower than the national average of 28.9 percent. Nine Indiana women were serving in the Indiana Senate.

== Selected published works ==
- History Indiana Federation of Clubs (1939)
