= Sarah E. Anderson =

American politician (1853–1900)

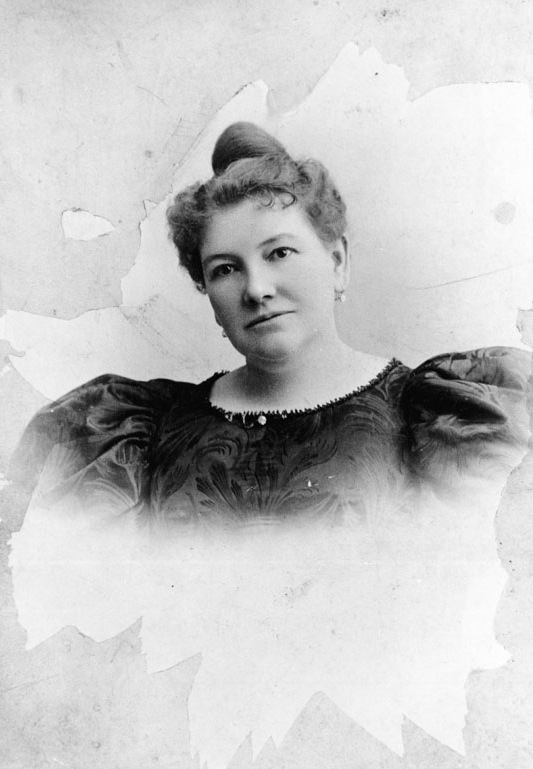

Member of the Utah House of Representatives from the 4th district
- In office January 11, 1897 – January 8, 1899

Personal details
- Born: January 30, 1853 Weber County, Utah
- Died: December 22, 1900 (aged 47)

Sarah Elizabeth Nelson Anderson (January 30, 1853 – December 22, 1900) was a member of the Utah House of Representatives. Just one year prior to her election, in 1895, she was described by The Ogden Daily Standard as "one of the most prominent and popular women in Ogden City and Weber County." The article also mentions her strength, both mental and physical. She challenged Charles Tyree, Odgen City's registrar, who refused to register her as a voter because of the Edmunds-Tucker Act. Her argument was taken to the territorial Supreme Court, where she ultimately lost. This did not change her desire to have a voice in government. In 1896 she joined the 2nd Utah State Legislature as one of three women to be elected there. During her service she was Chairperson of the House Committee on Public Health. She authored bills, none of which became law.

== Early life and family ==
Anderson was born on January 30, 1853, in Weber County, Utah, to parents David Nelson and Sarah Brown. At her death two brothers named C.A. Nelson and Wm. L. Wilson were listed as well as half-brother J.H. Nelson and half-sister Mrs. H.L. Griffin.

At the age of 17, she was married to Dr. Porter L. Anderson and bore five children with him until his death January 9, 1888. Widowed after 18 years of marriage, she was left to raise the five children. Their names are as follows; Lee Anderson, Mrs. Alta Anderson Costello, Dewey Anderson, Miss Maud and Florence. In an article that appear in the Salt Lake Tribune it was reported that her home life with her children occupied most of her time.

== Political career ==
=== Women enfranchisement ===
A year prior to her husband's death, Congress passed the Edmunds–Tucker Act, which amongst many restrictions also disenfranchised women. In 1894, Congress passed the Enabling Act, allowing Utah to submit an application for statehood, ratify a constitution, and elect state officials. Section 4 of the Enabling Act did not clarify that women were denied the right to vote to ratify the state constitution; it used the phrase "qualified voters of said proposed state." Previously in Section 2, it was clearer in mentioning the same eligibility should be used for the ratification vote as was voting for delegates, with being male listed as a qualification. Further complicating things, Section 19 stated that state government officials could be elected at the time of the ratification vote and did not mention any qualifications to vote. What qualifications were required came into question and women began asking to be registered to vote. The Utah Commission, which was a federally appointed group, was tasked with making lists of registered voters. Not wanting to interpret the law and face criticism, they suggested listing all females on a separate list so they could be easily dismissed if needed. However, the Utah Commission ultimately did not make this decision because on August 6, 1895, Anderson used this basis to go to local deputy registrar Charles Tyree to register as a voter. Tyree refused her petition. She successfully challenged this refusal to register her as a voter by arguing her case in a District Court.

Judge H.W. Smith ruled in her favor, allowing women to vote for ratification and state officials. Several well-respected lawyers helped her in success, including Franklin S. Richards, Samuel R. Thurman, and H.P. Henderson. Tyree, with the help of prominent attorney Arthur Brown, appealed it to the territorial Supreme Court, where Anderson ultimately lost. Two out of the three judges agreed the Enabling Act did not afford women the right vote to ratify the new state constitution or for state officials and Anderson had lost her case. Justice William H. King gave the dissenting opinion. Many women withdrew from politics as a result of the Supreme Court ruling, but Anderson continued. Utah's new constitution did contain perimeters allowing women to be enfranchised.

=== Legislator ===
Anderson would become one of the first women elected to Utah legislature during the 1896 elections. In office, she served as the chairperson of the House Committee on Public Health, although few of her bills passed. She authored two bills, HB 39 and HB 26. HB 39 was concerning police officers and fire commissioners. More specific details are not known about HB 39. This bill died because of a bad report in committee. HB 26 had the objective of teaching the results of drug and narcotic use in schools. This bill was also terminated, but a substitute bill with the same provisions was codified in state statutes.

=== Political preferences ===
Anderson was committed to her belief in gender equality. A legislative colleague, S. A. Kenner, noted that she was decisive and her political leanings were firm, being thoughtfully and carefully formed. At this time period during Anderson's political career a concern about women being in engaged in politics was that they would lose what was known as feminine charm. Also speaking of Anderson and supposedly to abate those fears he said, "Yet she did not lose her sweet, womanly repose." An article in the Salt Lake Tribune written in 1897 describes her to be well read and astutely up to date on current events and concerns.

== Later life ==
Anderson died on December 22, 1900, following a three-week illness. She was expected to make a full recovery and then suddenly became more weak and died soon after with her children surrounding her. Daughters Maud and Florence were between the ages of 16 and 18 when Sarah died. The Ogden Standard reported her death and stated "Mrs. Sarah Elizabeth Anderson was one of the most prominent and popular women in Ogden City and Weber County. Her life had been the making of one grand testimonial as to the goodness and worth of herself as a woman, a wife and a mother; she was one of the noblest and truest friends."
