= Clara Cressingham =

American politician

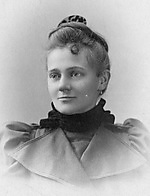

Member of the Colorado House of Representatives
- In office 1895–1896

Personal details
- Born: October 6, 1863 Brooklyn, New York, U.S.
- Died: c. July 1906 (aged 42) Denver, Colorado, U.S.
- Party: Republican

Clara Cressingham (October 6, 1863 – 1906) was one of the first women elected to serve in any state legislature in the United States. She was also the first woman to serve in a leadership position in any state legislature.

== Early life ==
Cressingham was born in Brooklyn, New York on October 6, 1863, the daughter of Seth W. Howard. She was raised in Brooklyn, where she also attended public schooling. She married William H. Cressingham in 1883 and the family moved to Denver in 1890, where her husband worked as a typesetter. After she and her husband had moved from New York, she was employed as a writer, and she was the mother of two children when elected to the Colorado General Assembly.

== Legislative career ==
Colorado became the first state in which women obtained the right to vote through popular election in 1893. The following year, on November 6, 1894, three women were elected to serve in the Colorado House of Representatives. Besides Cressingham, they included Carrie C. Holly and Frances S. Klock. All three were Republicans and were sworn into office in 1895. Each served one term, from 1895 to 1896.

At 32 years old, Clara Cressingham was the youngest of these three legislators. As Secretary of the House Republican Caucus, Cressingham was the first woman to fill a leadership position in an American legislature.

Cressingham is credited with being the first woman to introduce a law in the United States. It set a government–provided bounty of $3 per ton on sugar beets raised in the state and sold to a factory within its borders, thus boosting the budding Colorado sugar beet industry. Other bills she introduced during her two years in the House addressed the creation of a state board of arbitration and a system of free schools. Along with the other two women in the legislature, she successfully supported a bill to create homes for "delinquent" girls.

Cressingham died in 1906 of "rheumatism of the heart" at the age of 42. (Note: In addition to the recorded 1906 Denver burial for a Clara Cressingham, the 1910 US Federal Census has her husband listed as being a widower.)
