= Frances S. Klock =

American politician

Member of the Colorado House of Representatives
- In office 1895–1896

Personal details
- Born: February 1, 1844 Lee, Massachusetts, U.S.
- Died: October 6, 1908 (aged 64) Denver, Colorado, U.S.
- Party: Republican

Frances S. Klock (January 1, 1844 – October 6, 1908) was an American politician in the state of Colorado.

== Legislative career ==
Colorado became the first state in which women obtained the right to vote through popular election on January 7, 1893. The following year, on November 6, 1894, three women were elected to serve in the Colorado House of Representatives. Besides Frances Klock, they included Clara Cressingham and Carrie C. Holly. All three were Republicans and were sworn into office in 1895. Each served one term, from 1895 to 1896.
