= Carrie C. Holly =

American politician

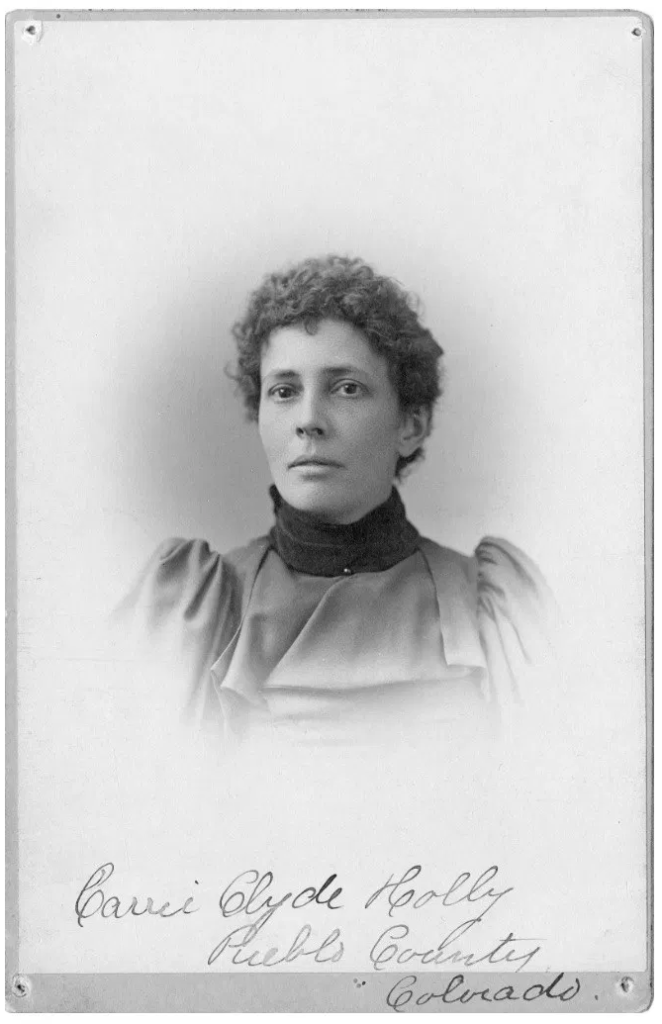

Member of the Colorado House of Representatives
- In office 1895–1896

Personal details
- Born: July 15, 1866 New York City, U.S.
- Died: July 13, 1943 (aged 76) Castle Rock, Washington, U.S.
- Party: Republican
- Spouse: Charles Frederick Holly

Caroline Clyde Holly (July 15, 1866 – July 13, 1943) was a U.S. politician in the state of Colorado.

== Legislative career ==
Colorado became the first state in which women obtained the right to vote through popular election in 1893. The following year, on November 6, 1894, three women were elected to serve in the Colorado House of Representatives. Besides Holly, they included Clara Cressingham and Frances S. Klock. All three were Republicans and were sworn into office in 1895. Each served one term, from 1895 to 1896.

Carrie Holly introduced a total of fourteen bills. One became law: a bill that aimed to increase the Age of Consent for girls to 21. The outcome was a compromise: the Age of Consent was increased to 18. Carrie Holly published a detailed account of the legislative process.

She did not run for re-election after her first term, although she maintained an active interest in politics and public affairs and was admitted to the bar in 1896.

She was married to the associate justice of the Colorado Territorial Supreme Court Charles Frederick Holly.
