= Women's suffrage in Colorado =

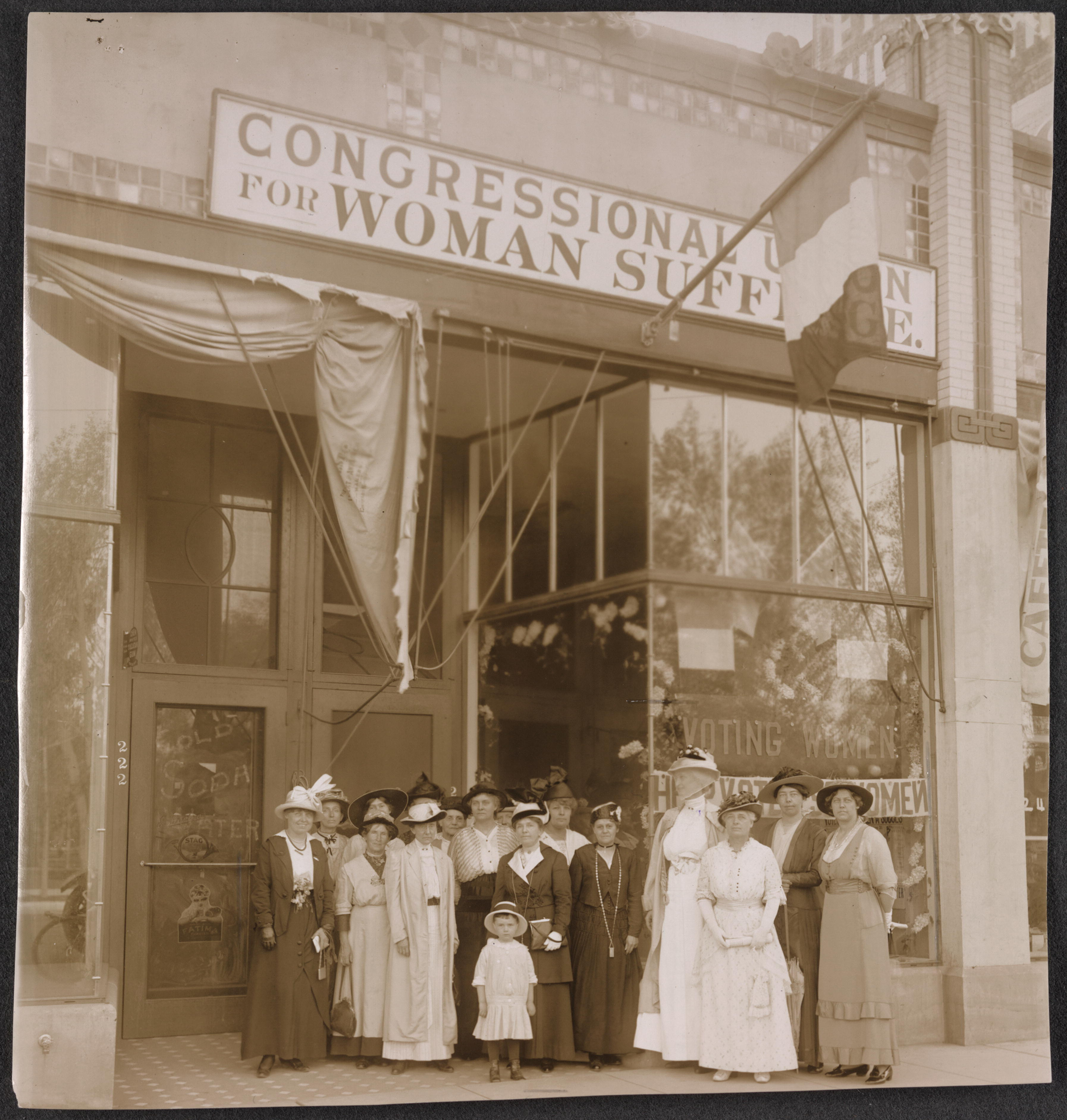
Colorado Headquarters of the Congressional Union.

In 1893, Colorado became the second state in the United States to grant women's suffrage and the first to do so through a voter referendum. Even while Colorado was a territory, lawmakers and other leaders tried to include women's suffrage in laws and later in the state constitution. The constitution did give women the right to vote in school board elections. The first voter referendum campaign was held in 1877. The Woman Suffrage Association of Colorado worked to encourage people to vote yes. Nationally known suffragists, such as Susan B. Anthony and Lucy Stone spoke alongside Colorado's own Alida Avery around the state. Despite the efforts to influence voters, the referendum failed. Suffragists continued to grow support for women's right to vote. They exercised their right to vote in school board elections and ran for office. In 1893, another campaign for women's suffrage took place. Both Black and white suffragists worked to influence voters, gave speeches, and turned out on election day in a last-minute push. The effort was successful and women earned equal suffrage. In 1894, Colorado again made history by electing three women to the Colorado house of representatives. After gaining the right to vote, Colorado women continued to fight for suffrage in other states. Some women became members of the Congressional Union (CU) and pushed for a federal suffrage amendment. Colorado women also used their right to vote to pass reforms in the state and to support women candidates.

== Early efforts ==
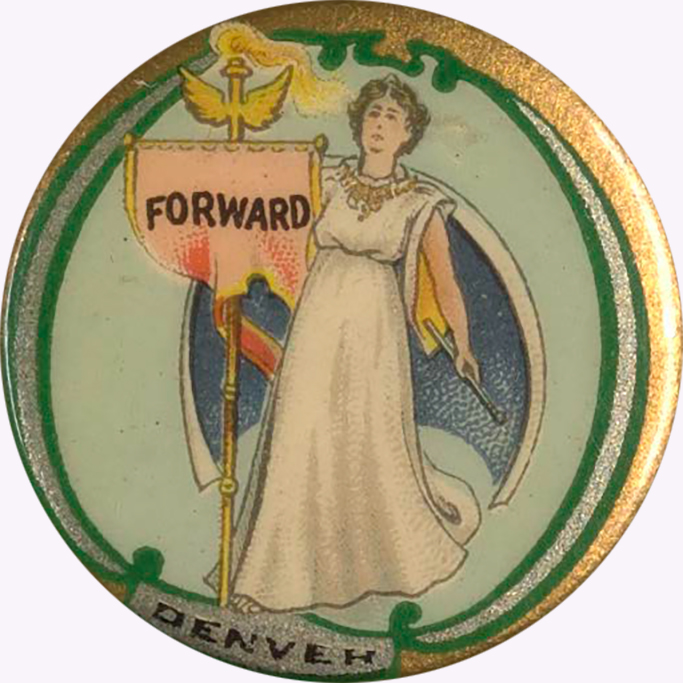
"Forward Denver" suffrage button, undated

Former governor of the territory of Colorado, John Evans, and D. M. Richards worked to include women's suffrage issues in the territorial legislature in 1868. Later, the territorial governor, Edward McCook, addressed the legislature on January 3, 1870, where he supported women's suffrage. The proposal to give women the vote was not only discussed by the lawmakers but also circulated throughout Colorado at churches and in the news.

Women's suffrage was reignited in 1876 when a convention was held at the Unity Church of Denver on January 10. The convention included speakers such as Margaret W. Campbell from Massachusetts and Reverend Eliza Tupper Wilkes from Colorado Springs. The convention formed the Territorial Woman Suffrage Society which had a committee that would address the upcoming state Constitutional Convention. The suffrage committee was able to address the convention, who "listened with respectful attention, but with a non-committal silence." The Woman Suffrage Association of Missouri also addressed the convention and many women's suffrage petitions were sent to the delegates. The Constitutional Convention considered women's suffrage on February 15. The delegates voted 24 to 8 against adding women's enfranchisement to the state constitution, though one section of the document allowed for later suffrage referendums. The convention also directed the first Colorado General Assembly to create a women's suffrage referendum during their first legislative session which was held in 1877. Women also gained the right to vote in school board elections.

Suffragists prepared for the upcoming 1877 referendum. On February 15, 1877, the Woman Suffrage Association held their annual convention and Alida Avery was elected president. On August 15, a mass meeting was held in Denver to organize a committee for a women's suffrage campaign. Susan B. Anthony came to the state in September to give a series of lectures. Another mass meeting took place in Denver on October 1 which included speakers such as Lucy Stone, Mary Grafton Campbell and Avery. The election took place on October 2 and women went to the polls to try to influence voters, however, the suffrage referendum was defeated.

After the defeat of the 1877 referendum, there was only one other women's suffrage bill in the Colorado General Assembly. The bill, proposed in 1881 to grant women municipal suffrage never passed. The General Assembly did receive a petition for women's suffrage in 1891.

In 1881, a meeting was held to create the Colorado Equal Suffrage Association (CESA). When Matilda Hindman of South Dakota arrived in Colorado in 1890 to raise money for efforts in her territory, she helped reignite suffrage organizations in Denver. Hindman held a meeting in her rooms at the Richelieu Hotel where women not only raised money for South Dakota but also created a Denver chapter of CESA. Members of the CESA began to pressure the General Assembly on women's suffrage. The arrival of Louise M. Tyler, moving from Boston to Denver, also spurred the creation of an auxiliary to the National American Woman Suffrage Association (NAWSA). Over time the membership of the auxiliary grew, with Tyler serving as president until 1892.

Women journalists helped the fight for women's suffrage in Colorado. Both Ellis Meredith and Minnie Reynolds secured support from Colorado newspapers on women's suffrage. Journalist Caroline Nichols Churchill attended the 1881 meeting to create the CESA, but when a man was elected president, she refused to continue to work with CESA. She did help form the Fort Collins Equal Suffrage Association that year. Churchill, who wrote the women's rights newspaper, the Queen Bee, felt that women should be in charge of women's organizations. Despite Churchill's refusal to participate in the organization, her newspaper continued to cover women's suffrage and took on the topic from a more radical perspective. The paper also helped to build support for women's suffrage in Colorado. Her paper urged women to exercise their right to vote in school elections.

The tactic of mobilizing women to vote in school elections was also supported by the Woman's Christian Temperance Union (WCTU) in Colorado. Showing that women were interested in voting and were already using their limited voting rights was key to the suffragists' argument that women wanted equal franchise. Women also were key to the successful election of Ione T. Hanna to the Denver School Board in May 1893.

== Suffrage referendum ==
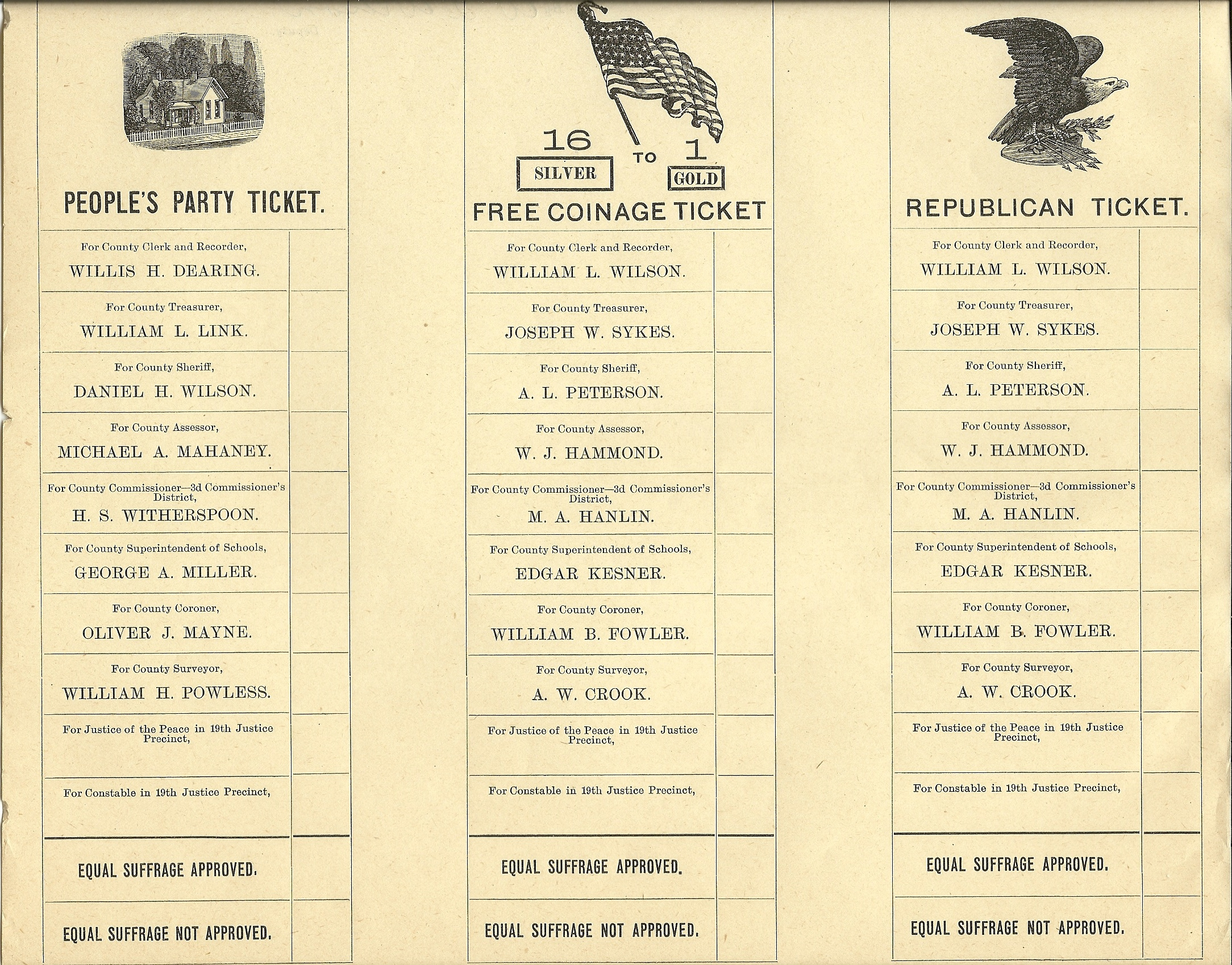
1893 Ballot for Park County, Colorado. Women's suffrage referendum choice is at the bottom.

The General Assembly of Colorado passed a bill for a voter referendum for women's suffrage in 1893. That year, the state suffrage group changed its name to the Non-Partisan Equal Suffrage Association of Colorado (CNPESA). Martha A. Pease was elected president and Elizabeth Piper Ensley served as treasurer. At first, CNPESA met at members' homes, but later, Baby Doe Tabor donated the use of rooms in the Tabor Grand Opera House in Denver.

When the suffrage campaign began for the upcoming vote, the CNPESA only had a little less than $25 in their treasury. In Denver, suffragists asked the National American Woman Suffrage Association (NAWSA) for help. Ellis Meredith, the vice president of CNPESA, attended the NAWSA annual convention in June and convinced Carrie Chapman Catt to aid in the campaign. Lucy Stone donated to the Colorado campaign, as did suffragists from Iowa and California. Small clubs around the state mobilized to support the campaign. Minnie Reynolds was able to get around 75% of the newspapers in Colorado to support women's suffrage. Catt came to Colorado to speak in September where she was "well received." Wherever there were not suffrage groups, Catt organized the women in town.

Before the election, suffragists produced fliers that showed voters which choice to select to approve women's suffrage. On the day of the vote, November 7, men who supported women's suffrage urged suffragists to appear at the polls. Many did, giving out suffrage leaflets and encouraging men to vote for equal franchise. The referendum passed in favor of women's suffrage, 35,798 for and 29,451 against. Colorado became the first state to enfranchise women through the popular vote, and the second state to give women equal suffrage. The first woman to register to vote in Colorado was Eliza Pickrell Routt.

== After state suffrage ==
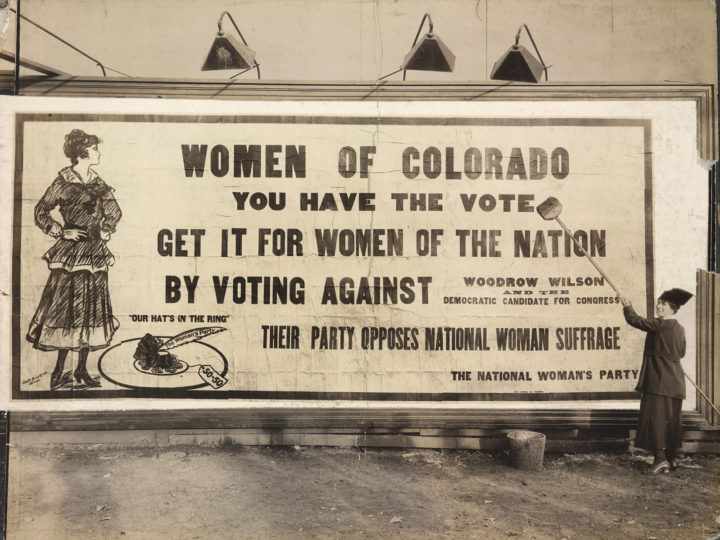
National Woman's Party suffrage billboard in Denver, 1916

Women were involved in supporting reforms in Colorado after they won the vote. Many of these reforms were related to the welfare of children, women's rights, and temperance issues. Sanitation of the state also improved after women's suffrage. Women also ran for office, with three women representatives elected in 1894: Clara Cressingham, Carrie C. Holly, and Frances S. Klock. By 1906, more than half of Colorado counties had women school superintendents.

The Colorado State Equal Suffrage League (CSESL) existed for two years. It sponsored The Colorado Woman, a periodical edited by Prof. Grace Espy Patton, the first issue published in December 1894.

The Colorado Equal Suffrage Association (CESA) stayed together after women won the vote in Colorado so that suffragists could help activists in other states. Colorado suffragists also testified in front of the United States Congress and served as delegates to political party conventions. In 1896, a national survey of women's officeholding in the United States was published and crowned both Colorado and Kansas as the "banner states" for women's right to hold office.

Caroline Spencer from Colorado Springs was involved in the more militant suffrage group, the Congressional Union (CU, and later known as the National Woman's Party), where she was one of the most active members in the state. Spencer picketed the White House and was arrested and imprisoned for her protest work on behalf of national women's suffrage. Along with Spencer, Ruth Astor Noyes was another active CU member who worked in Colorado. Noyes helped organize support for a national woman's suffrage amendment among Colorado's major political parties. The Democratic Party in Colorado worked to organize against the CU, seeing the organization as a threat because they protested against the party for failing to support women's suffrage. The work of the CU eventually led to state political parties to include support for women's suffrage in their platforms. In 1916, the Suffrage Special came through Colorado, stopping in Denver and Colorado Springs in April. The Suffrage Special was a tour planned by the CU. Members of the CU wanted to recruit women from the West where the vote had succeeded. The suffragists on the national tour were treated to luncheons and mass meetings. The Prison Special also came through and visited Denver in 1919.

In the Colorado General Assembly, Representative Mabel Ruth Baker and co-author, Senator Agnes L. Riddle, submitted House Joint Resolution No. 2 to encourage the U.S. Senate to pass the amendment. After the women's suffrage amendment passed the U.S. Congress, Colorado called a special legislative session to open on December 8, 1919. Representatives May Tower Bigelow and Baker proposed the resolution to ratify the amendment in the General Assembly. Both houses went on to unanimously ratified the Nineteenth Amendment. The final gavel was given to Representative Bigelow so that a woman could close the results. The ratification was signed on December 15, 1919. The League of Women Voters (LWV) of Colorado was formed on June 17, 1920.

== African American and Native American women's suffrage ==
In the 1870s a Colored Woman's Suffrage Association was established in Denver. In 1893, Elizabeth Piper Ensley was one of the founding members of the Non-Partisan Equal Suffrage Association of Colorado (CNPESA). Ensley helped to encourage African American women in Colorado to join the movement and influenced Black men to vote for women's suffrage.

Despite the passage of the Indian Citizenship Act in 1924 which declared all Native Americans to be U.S. citizens, Native American women who lived on reservations were not allowed to vote until 1970. Members of the Colorado Ute tribe continued to face issues voting well into the 90s.

== Anti-suffragism in Colorado ==
The Catholic bishop of Colorado, Joseph Projectus Machebeuf, was vocally against women's suffrage. His opinions on women's suffrage had an effect on areas of the state with large Catholic populations. Liquor interests were also opposed to women's suffrage in Colorado.

== See also ==
- List of Colorado suffragists
- Timeline of women's suffrage in Colorado
- Women's suffrage in states of the United States
- Women's suffrage in the United States
