= List of Colorado suffragists =

Coordinates: 38.9972°N 105.5478°W

The location of the State of Colorado in the United States of America.

This is a list of suffragists, suffrage groups, and others associated with the cause of women's suffrage in the U.S. State of Colorado.

== Groups ==
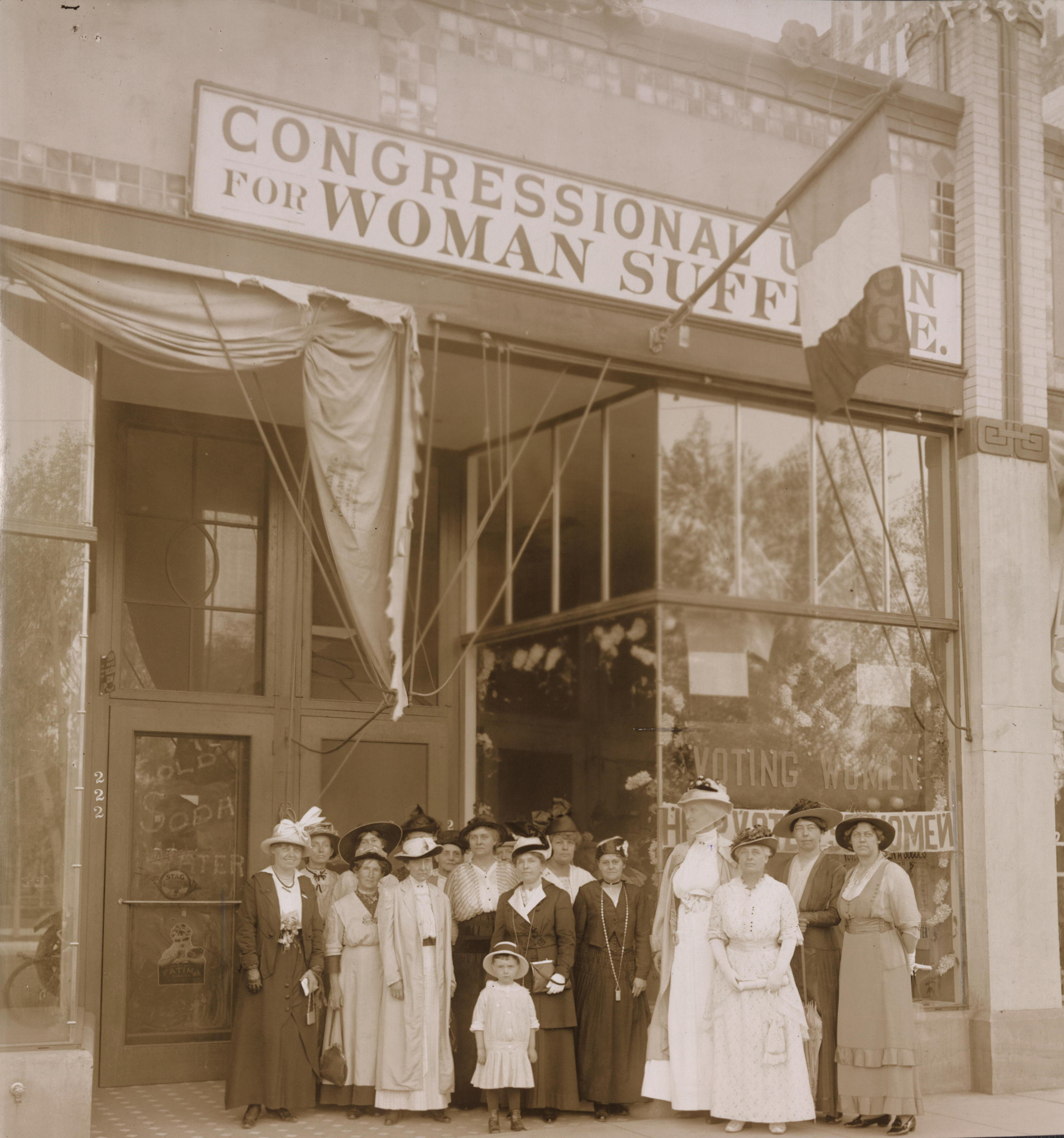
Congressional Union for Woman Suffrage - 1914. Left to right: 1. Mrs. Alberta Benson (Chairman Sale of Suffragist); 2. Miss Hattie Bell Gandy; 3. Mrs. Carrie Gledhill; 4. Back of her Miss Amand Blocker Byrd (Reporter for the Telegraph); 5. Dr. Caroline Spencer - State Secretary; 6. Mrs. E. St. Clair Thompson, Organizer; 7. Mrs. Thos. H. Anderson; 8. Mrs. Van Rouse; 9. Mrs. Lillian Kerr 1st vice-chairman; 10. Mrs. Bertha W. Fowler - State Chairman; 11. Mrs. A.B. Williams; 12. Mrs. Alice M. Ruggles of the Boston Equal Suffrage League; 13. Mrs. Robt. Fuller, formerly of Dover, Mass. - now of Colorado Springs.

- City League of Denver
- Colorado Equal Suffrage Association, formed in 1881.
- Colorado Non-Partisan Suffrage Association
- Colored Woman's Suffrage Association
- Congressional Union for Woman Suffrage, later the National Woman's Party
- Fort Collins Equal Suffrage Association, formed in 1881.
- Territorial Woman Suffrage Society (also Colorado Woman Suffrage Society), formed in 1876.
- Woman's Christian Temperance Union (WCTU)
- Young Women's League

== Suffragists ==
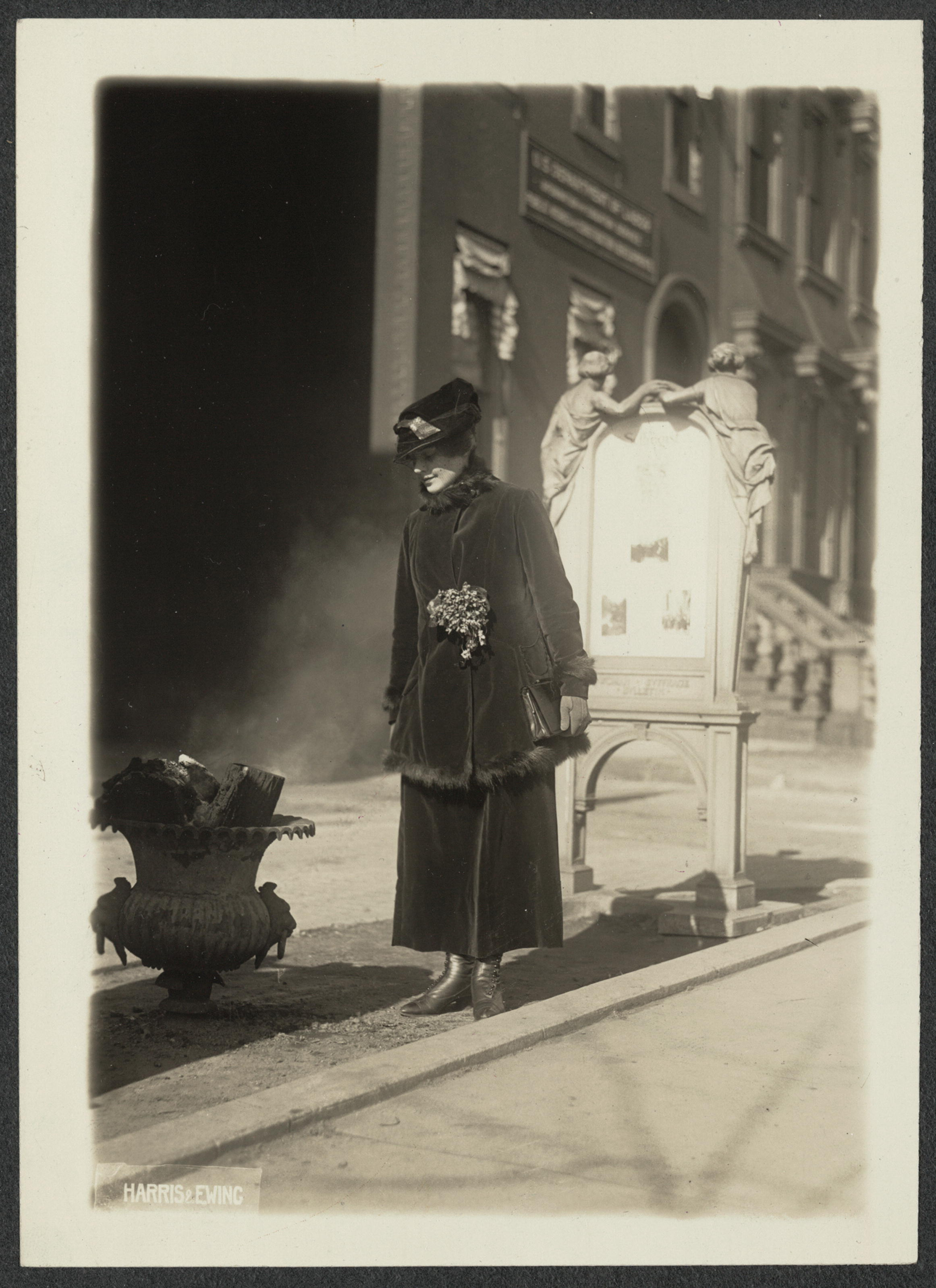
Berthe Arnold at a watchfire.

- Frances Wisebart Jacobs (Denver)
- Theodosia Ammons (Denver)
- Berthe Louise Arnold (Colorado Springs)
- Virginia Arnold (Colorado Springs)
- Alida Avery (Denver)
- Adella Brown Bailey (Denver).
- Mary B. Bates
- Elsie Lincoln Benedict
- Louie Croft Boyd
- Mary C. C. Bradford (Denver)
- Margaret Brown
- Margaret W. Campbell
- Caroline Nichols Churchill (Denver)
- Martha A. B. Conine
- Sarah Jane Leffingwell Corbin (Fort Collins)
- Amy K. Cornwall
- Ray David (Denver)
- Sarah Platt-Decker
- Ida Clark DePriest.
- Elizabeth Ensley
- Mary L. Geffs
- Natalie Gray (Colorado Springs)
- Olive Hogle
- Julia Archibald Holmes
- Katherine Tipton Hosmer (Springfield)
- Margaret W. Kessler (Denver)
- Lucy McIntyre (Fort Collins)
- Ellis Meredith
- Mildred Morris (Denver)
- Grace Espy Patton (Fort Collins)
- Martha A. Pease
- Elizabeth Eyre Pellett
- Minnie J. Reynolds (Denver)
- Helen Ring Robinson
- Eliza Pickrell Routt
- Hazel Schmoll
- Caroline Spencer (Colorado Springs)
- Isaac N. Stevens
- Elizabeth Hickok Robbins Stone (Fort Collins)
- Baby Doe Tabor (Leadville and Denver)
- Mary Jewett Telford
- Louise M. Tyler (Denver)
- Albina Washburn (Loveland)
- Eliza Tupper Wilkes (Colorado Springs)

=== Politicians supporting women's suffrage ===
- Lucas Brandt (Larimer County)
- Henry P. Bromwell (Denver)
- Jared L. Brush
- Allison H. DeFrance (Jefferson County)
- John Evans
- Omar E. Garwood (Denver)
- Silas Haynes (Weld County)
- Edward McCook
- John Long Routt
- Amos Steck
- Agapito Vigil
- Davis Hanson Waite
- Abram Young (Jefferson County)

== Publications ==
- The Colorado Antelope, founded in 1879, later known as the Queen Bee in 1882.
- The Colorado Woman.

== Suffragists campaigning in Colorado ==
- Susan B. Anthony
- Mary Grafton Campbell
- Carrie Chapman Catt
- Laura Ormiston Chant
- Susan S. Fessenden
- Matilda Hindman
- Therese A. Jenkins
- Anne Henrietta Martin
- Ruth Astor Noyes
- Lucy Stone

== Antisuffragists ==
- Joseph Projectus Machebeuf (Denver)

== See also ==
- Timeline of women's suffrage in Colorado
- Women's suffrage in Colorado
- List of African American suffragists
- List of American suffragists
- Women's suffrage in states of the United States
- Women's suffrage in the United States
- Bibliography of Colorado
- Geography of Colorado
- History of Colorado
- Index of Colorado-related articles
- List of Colorado-related lists
- Outline of Colorado
