= Timeline of women's suffrage in Colorado =

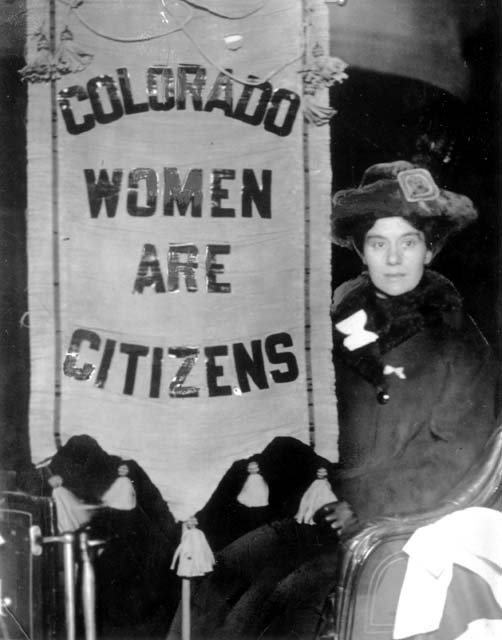
Colorado Women are Citizens

This is a timeline of women's suffrage in Colorado. Women's suffrage efforts started in the late 1860s. During the state constitutional convention for Colorado, women received a small win when they were granted the right to vote in school board elections. In 1877, the first women's suffrage referendum was defeated. In 1893, another referendum was successful. After winning the right to vote, Colorado women continued to fight for a federal women's suffrage amendment. While most women were able to vote, it wasn't until 1970 that Native Americans living on reservations were enfranchised.

== 19th century ==
=== 1860s ===
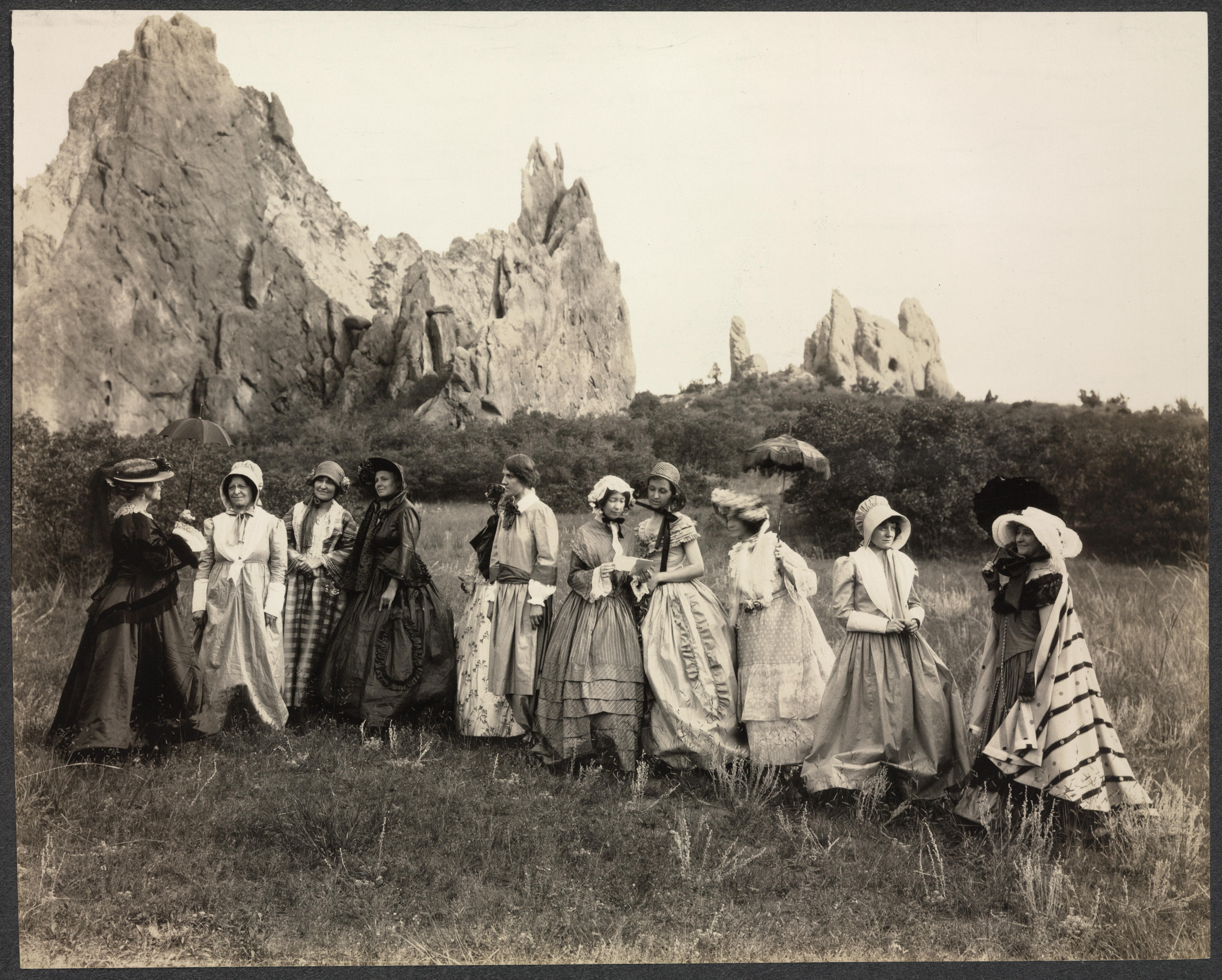
Rehearsing with Garden of the Gods at Colorado Springs

1868

- John Evans and D. M. Richards worked to include women's suffrage as an issue in the territorial legislature.

=== 1870s ===
1870

- January 3: The territorial governor, Edward M. McCook, addresses the legislature where he supports women's suffrage.

1876

- January 10: Women's suffrage convention is held at the Unity Church in Denver.
- February 15: The state Constitutional Convention delegates hear arguments on women's suffrage. Women's suffrage is defeated by a vote of 24 to 8, but a provision of the constitution allows later suffrage referendums.

1877

- February 15: The Woman Suffrage Association holds their annual convention.
- August 15: A mass meeting to organize a women's suffrage campaign took place in Denver.
- September 11: Susan B. Anthony arrives in Granada to give a women's suffrage speech.
- October 1: Another mass meeting is held in Denver. Speakers include Lucy Stone and Margaret W. Campbell.

1879

- Women's rights newspaper, The Colorado Antelope, is founded by Caroline Nichols Churchill.

=== 1800s ===
1881

- The Colorado Equal Association is organized.
- A bill to grant municipal suffrage to women fails in the General Assembly.

=== 1890s ===
1891

- The General Assembly receives a women's suffrage petition.

1893

- January 24: Women's suffrage bill comes out of committee and goes to the state House.
- March 8: Women's suffrage bill is voted on again in the House and passed 34 to 27.
- April 3: The bill passes in the state Senate, 20 to 10.
- September 4: Carrie Chapman Catt comes to Colorado for a series of lectures and to help organize suffrage groups.
- November 7: The referendum on women's suffrage takes place and suffragists win the right to vote in all elections in Colorado.

== 20th century ==
=== 1910s ===
1914

- The Congressional Union opens their headquarters in Denver.

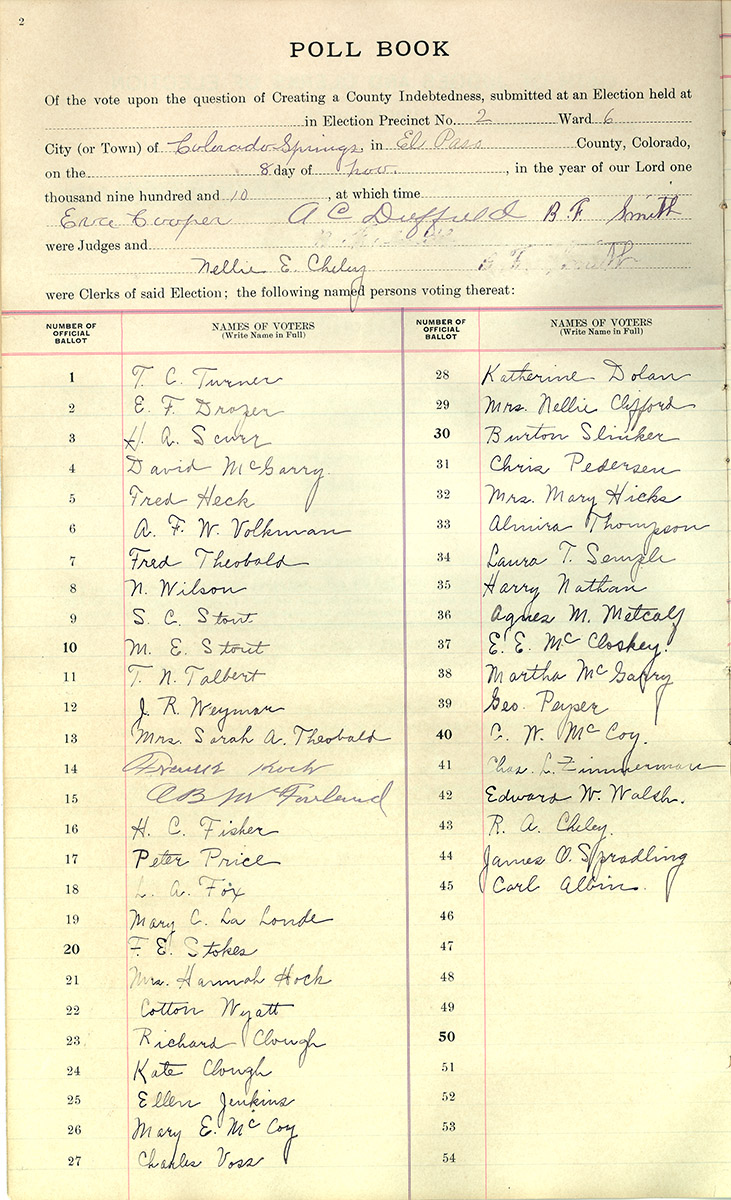
Colorado Springs poll book, November 8, 1910

1916

- April 15: The Suffrage Special arrives in Denver.
- April 17: The Suffrage Special arrives in Colorado Springs.
- August: The National Woman's Party holds a convention in Colorado Springs at the Hotel Antlers.

1919

- December 8: A special session of the Colorado General Assembly is called.
- December 15: Colorado ratifies the Nineteenth Amendment.
- The Prison Special visits Denver.

=== 1920s ===
1920

- June 17: The State Equal Suffrage Association dissolves and becomes the League of Women Voters of Colorado.

1924

- The Indian Citizenship Act gives Native Americans U.S. citizenship, but Colorado will not allow them to vote.

=== 1970s ===
1970

- Native Americans living on reservations are finally allowed to vote in Colorado.

== See also ==
- List of Colorado suffragists
- Women's suffrage in Colorado
- Women's suffrage in states of the United States
- Women's suffrage in the United States
