= May Tower Bigelow =

American artist, lawyer, physician and politician

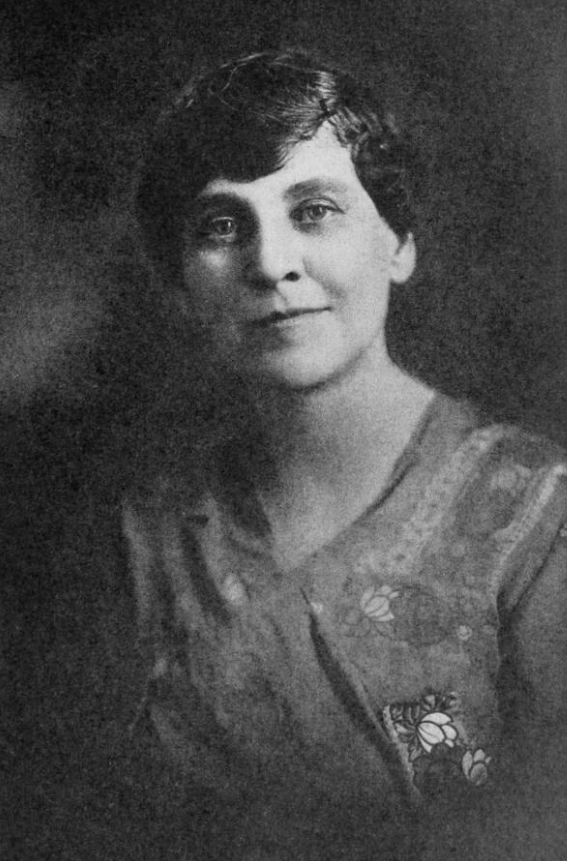

Member of the Colorado House of Representatives
- In office 1919

Personal details
- Born: May Tower; April 13, 1866 St. Charles, Minnesota, US
- Died: October 28, 1935 (aged 69) Denver, Colorado, US
- Party: Republican
- Spouse: Charles Wesley Bigelow (m. 1891)
- Children: 4
- Education: Nebraska State University; Radcliffe College; LMU Munich; University of Colorado School of Medicine
- Occupation: Artist, lawyer, physician

May Tower Bigelow (April 13, 1866 – October 28, 1935) was an artist, lawyer, physician and state legislator serving in the Colorado House of Representatives 1919 session.

== Biography ==
She was born April 13, 1866, in St. Charles, Minnesota. She studied at Nebraska State University and Radcliffe College.

After her education she started teaching, then progressed to be a mathematics instructor at the Nebraska State Normal College, now the University of Nebraska at Kearney. She then went on to study law and pass the Nebraska bar.

She was an artist and made illustrations for a medical publication.

She married Charles Wesley Bigelow an educator and banker, on May 16, 1891, and they had four children together and moved to Denver.

Both her and her husband then went to Harvard University for postgraduate work, before going to Europe to study first in England then on to study medicine at the Ludwig-Maximilians-Universität München (LMU) in Germany. They returned to Colorado, and she completed her study at the University of Colorado School of Medicine and obtained her doctor of medicine degree in June 1915.

== Political career ==
She was one of two women to run to serve in the Colorado House of Representatives in 1918 on the Republican ticket along with Mabel Ruth Baker. Both Bigelow and Baker won seats in the house for the session starting on January 1, 1919, with another woman Agnes Riddle serving in the state senate in the same session. She was a Republican and represented the Denver district in the house. In a special session of the legislature held on December 8, 1919, a resolution put forth by these three women legislators sought to ratify the Federal Suffrage Amendment that would then go on to be the Nineteenth Amendment to the United States Constitution.

In 1920 she also ran in the Republican Primary for the office of Superintendent of Public Instruction, but lost to Katherine L. Craig who received 67.7% of the vote.

Her final attempt at political office was to run for Mayor of Denver in 1927 but she was unsuccessful.

== Murder accusation and death ==
When not pursuing politics she ran a medical practice and health clinics.

In May 1935 she was accused of performing an illegal operation that resulted in the death of Ella Lea Moynahan the young wife of legislator James Moynahan from the 29th general assembly.

Bigelow died October 28, 1935, from a blood clot on the brain. She was survived by her husband and three of her children. Her husband blamed the continued worry over the unresolved murder changes for quickening her death, a charge that Bigelow had strongly denied.
