= Minnie Reynolds Scalabrino =

American journalist

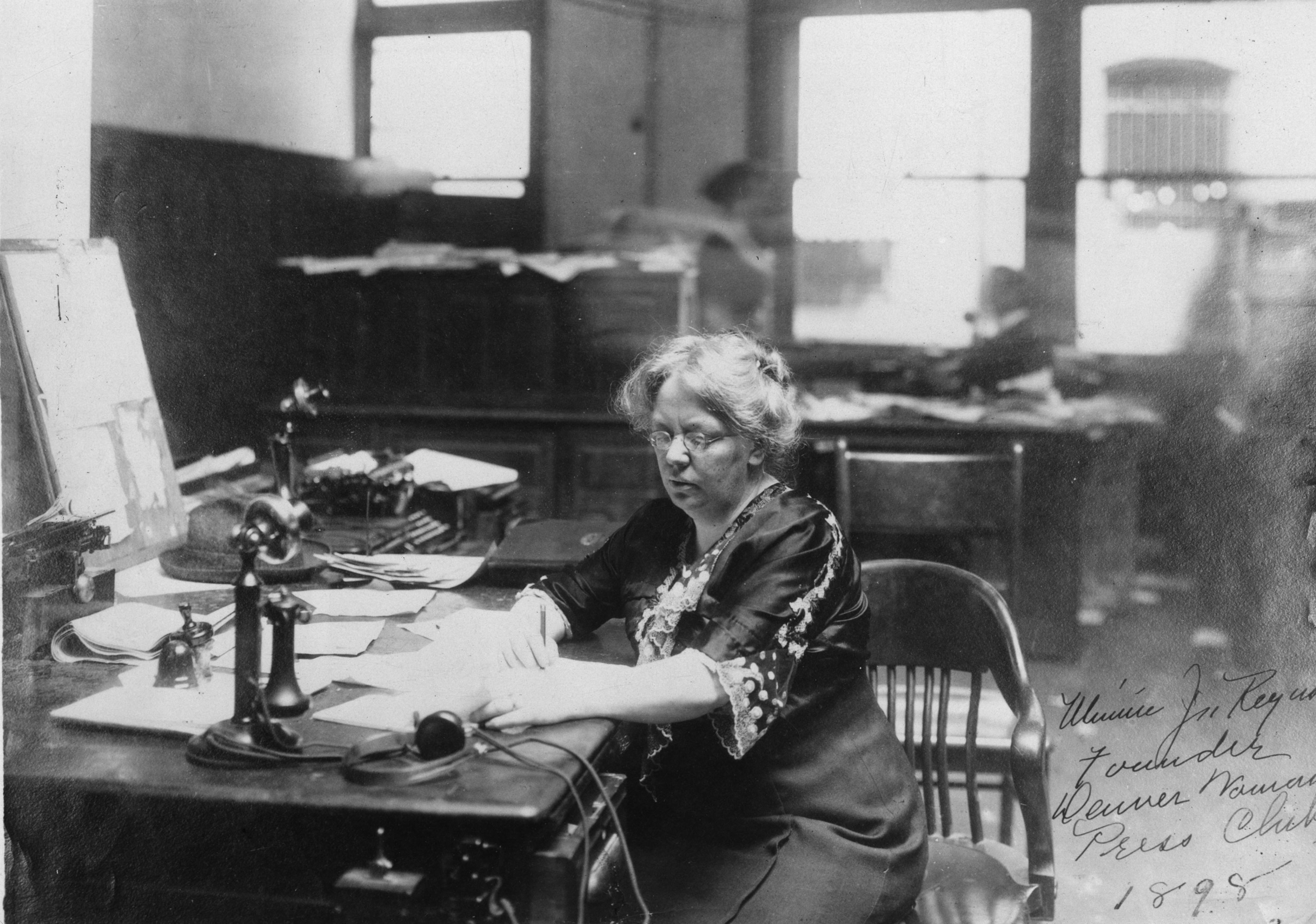
- Minnie J. Reynolds in 1895, History Colorado
- Born: Minnie Josephine Reynolds; 1865; Norwood, New York, United States
- Died: May 29, 1936 (aged 70–71)
- Burial place: Family plot at Norwood, New York
- Other names: M. J. Reynolds
- Occupations: Journalist, suffragette, women's club organizer, book author
- Known for: Leader in state and national campaigns that gave women the right to vote

Minnie Reynolds Scalabrino (1865 – 1936) was an American journalist, women's rights activist, and organizer, founding the Denver Woman's Press Club and Denver Woman's Club. She advocated for equal rights, women's suffrage and temperance, something that she was devoted to for more than 30 years. She was instrumental in the passage of laws that gave women the right to vote at the state level, and then in 1920 for women throughout the United States.

She organized Denver and state libraries for the Women's Club of Denver and the State Federation of Women's Club. She wrote for the Rocky Mountain News about women's issues, society news, politics, and women's clubs activities. She wrote several books, her best is The Terror, a novel about the French Revolution.

She was married in 1905, but continued to use her maiden name Minnie J. Reynolds because that was what she had been known as for years.

== Early life ==
Minnie Josephine Reynolds was born in Norwood, New York in 1865. (Note: She was said to have been born in January 1870 in the 1900 census, but the 1870 census shows her to be five years old and living with her parents.) She was the fourth of six children born to Sarah Rood and Wait Reynolds, the latter of whom died in 1880. He was a farmer, a prominent businessman and esteemed citizen of the Norwood and Potsdam communities. She had an older sister Helen, a school teacher, who took on the responsibility of providing for and educating her siblings after their father died; her mother was an invalid. Helen was 13 years older, Jesse was about 8 years older, and she had younger siblings, Grace and Harry. Helen joined her in Colorado to fight for women's suffrage, a cause that was also important to their mother.

== Career ==
Scalabrino came to Colorado and worked as a school teacher at Pitkin, Colorado. While there, she submitted articles and poems to the Pitkin Miner newspaper. She also contributed to a newspaper in Aspen, Colorado. She had written a number of articles under the name M. J. Reynolds. The Rocky Mountain News hired her, assuming that she was a man. Accordingly, she moved to Denver in 1890 to work for the paper. When they saw that she was a woman, she was assigned as a society editor. She met people on the street, when bicycling through the city, to gather interesting news stories. On May 17, 1891, the Rocky Mountain News published her story about the "Early Days of Colorado" and on June 26, 1892, it published the article "The Mare Stella". In 1894, she wrote "A ballad of China-Town", "Washington", "Ballad of Modern Times", and "Men of the Common Weal". After she became the editor of the women's page, she wrote political articles.

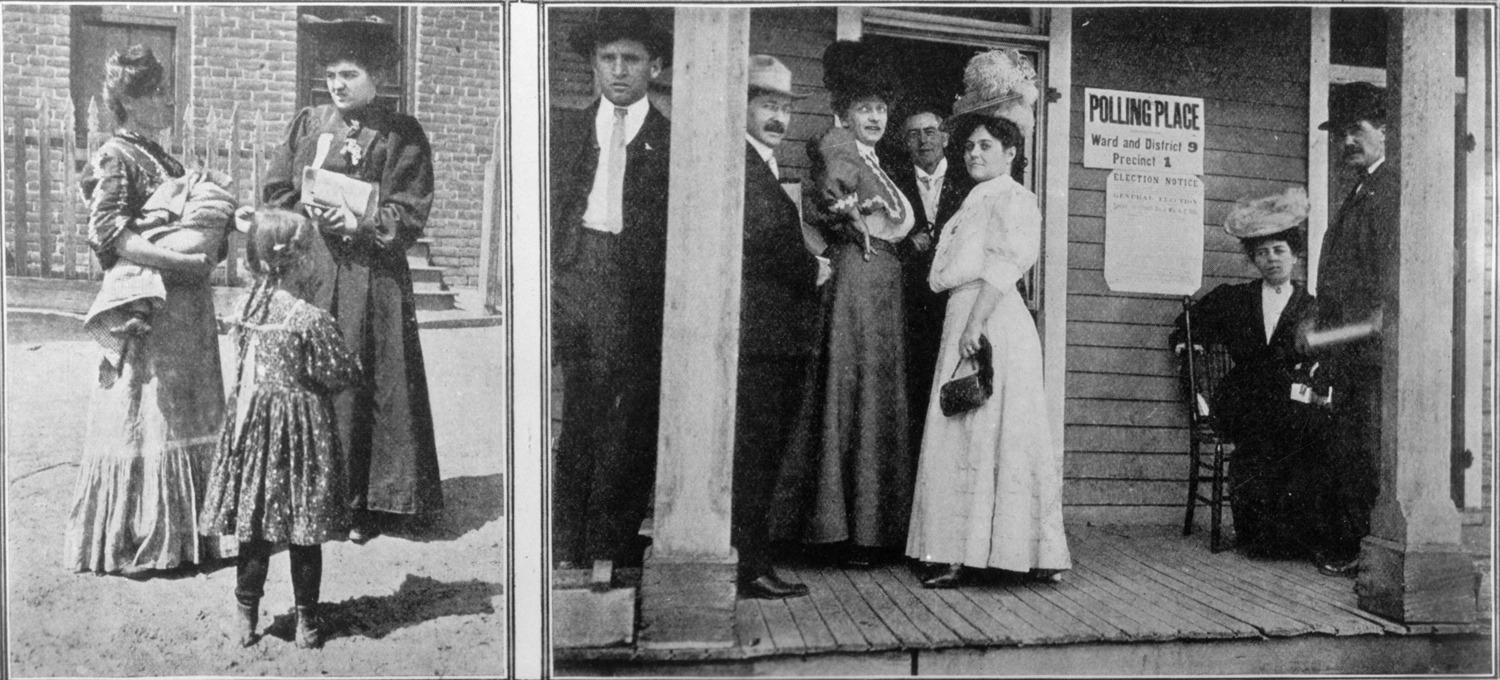
Both men and women are lined up outside a polling station. Suffragettes fought for the right to vote for Colorado women, succeeding in 1893.

In 1893, she lobbied politicians and journalists to promote women's right to vote. The state's equal suffrage bill was put before the legislature that year. She convinced 75% of Colorado newspapers to include pro-suffrage editorials and columns. She, Ellis Meredith, and Patience Stapleton wrote newspaper articles and editorials. Scalabrino's articles were published in the Rocky Mountain News. Her sister Helen moved to Colorado, where she became the campaign secretary and the press chair of the Colorado Equal Suffrage Association. Carrie Chapman Catt visited Colorado to help the drive for women's right to vote. The bill was put on the ballot for the November 1893 election, and women were granted the right to vote in the state. Wyoming, a territory at the time, had already given women the right to vote. Colorado was the first state to do so. Scalabrino became known as an expert on woman's suffrage campaign techniques. Other important suffrage activists included Elizabeth Piper Ensley, an African American suffragette of Denver; Dr. Ethel Strasser of Grand Junction; Caroline Nichols Churchill ; and Anna Chamberlain of Colorado Springs. See also: List of Colorado suffragists

Scalabrino ran for state legislature in 1894. A member of the Populist Party, she did well in the polls, but did not win the election. She supported civil rights for African Americans and labor unions. Although women had attained the right to vote and she was perceived as a good speaker, public opinion was against giving women the right to be legislators at that time.

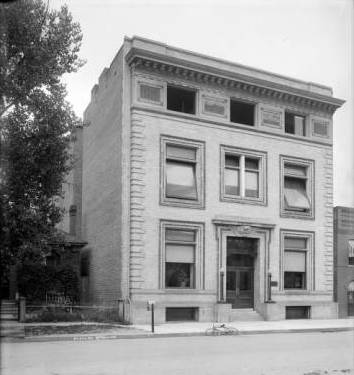
Woman's Club Denver, ca. 1910

In 1894, she founded the Denver Woman's Club. Four years later, she founded and was the first president of the Denver Woman's Press Club, which supports journalists, publicists, and writers. The Press Club's purpose has been "To advance and encourage women in literary work, to cultivate acquaintance and friendship among women of literarv tastes, to secure the benefits arising from organized effort, and to drive dull care away." She led the effort to create libraries and circulating libraries under the auspices of the Women's Club of Denver. This was followed later by a traveling library for the State Federation of Women's Club, with Colorado the only state to win a national award for a library. She began writing about women's club activities for the newspaper.

While on vacation in the eastern United States, Scalabrino sent some of her stories to editors at the New York Post and The New York Times. The Times hired her in 1901 to write about Colorado and its women. After she resigned from the Rocky Mountain News, The Times hired her as a full-time reporter. She wrote a column in the paper called "By the Bachelor Girl" in which she stated in 1903 that: 'The woman who cultivates her conversational powers in order to make herself agreeable to men hasn't a bit of sense' and 'No woman with a grain of sense ever lets a man gather from her remarks that his character offers any intricacies to her comprehension'. She also wrote "Ship Me Somewhere" in 1911 for The Times:

Ship me somewhere west of Kansas where the earth's not crowded so;
Where they have about four people to each square mile, you know;
Where the atmosphere's been washed and dried and Ironed so smooth and fine
That it seems a happy foretaste of some elixir divine.

For I'm sick of all these people, swarming, sweltering to und fro.
Sick of twenty-storied scrapers, and the stony streets below;
About this time each year It comes, that longing back to me.
For those spaces west of Kansas, where they stretch out wide and free.

Oh, 1 love the locomotive, when her head is pointed West,
And her wheels are swift revolving, it is then I love her best;
Past the lake front at Chicago, cornfields rich of "old Miszoo,"
Past the bluffs at Kansas City, westward portals rolling through

When my long day's work is over, and I toil und moil no more,
don't plant me in the sodden earth upon this foggy shore;
Ship me somewhere west of Kansas, where the great plains onward sweep‘
Neath the shadow of the Rockies it is still, and I shall sleep.

In New Jersey, she was a suffragist as well as secretary and state organizer for the Women's Political Union. She worked for the National American Woman Suffrage Association from 1901 to 1909. After her marriage, she wrote a few books and had her articles published. She wrote The Chalk in the Bartomn Schools, How Man Conquered Nature. and The Crayon Clue.

She drafted a proposed amendment for Congress that would grant women the right to vote across the United States in 1909. She was requested to do this by the National American Woman Suffrage Association. She saw the women attaining the right to vote in Washington state, California, Arizona, Oregon, Kansas, and New York by 1917. She gave 100 speeches in the state of Washington alone and because she had built a national presence with her maiden name, she billed herself as Minnie Reynolds.

She was back in Colorado when the Nineteenth Amendment to the United States Constitution was passed in June 1918 and became law on August 26, 1920. She recalled: "on the last great drive which took the federal amendment through, I was down and out with neuritis."

She completed the last and perhaps best novel, The Terror (1930) that was set during the French Revolution. She continued to speak about women's right to vote into 1934.

== Personal life ==
She had a new Victorian house at Broadway and Bayaud in Denver in the 1890s. In 1900, she was head of the household of her siblings on Bayaud Street, including her older sister Helen, younger sister Grace, and younger brother Harry.

When she worked for The New York Times, she wrote a series of articles about Italy. During that time, she met Salvatore Scalabrino. She married him in Manhattan, New York on December 31, 1904, becoming Minnie Reynolds Scalabrino. They spent a year in Italy getting to know his family and throughout Europe. They returned to the United States in 1906. She lived in Bloomfield, New Jersey in 1909. Scalabrino visited in Colorado in November 1910, and spent her final years on the Scalabrino's farm in New Jersey.

She had a stroke in May 1936, after which she was taken 20 miles to a hospital in Phillipsburg, New Jersey. She died there on May 29, 1936. She was buried in her family's plot in Norwood, New York.

== Legacy ==
She was a role model during the late 19th century for women who sought to define themselves outside of their stereotypical roles of a "homemaker and appendage of her husband". Scalabrino was described by the University of Colorado Denver as a woman who "broke barriers as a female journalist and devoted her life to the fight for suffrage." In 2022, she was inducted into the Colorado Women's Hall of Fame.

== See also ==
- Jeannette Rankin, a suffragette that she mentored
