= Mary L. Geffs =

American journalist

Mary L. Geffs (1854–1939) was an author, speaker, and suffragist. She married young and her husband, who was a stock trader and legislator, died at a young age. As a young woman, she worked in sweat shops to support her family. She investigated and reported on occupational hazards in sweat shops and coal mining camps, and became an advocate for occupational safety. Geffs went on lecture tours for the Socialist Party of America and campaigned for University of Colorado regent, state superintendent of public instruction, and governor.

She was a delegate for the National Woman Suffrage Association conventions and she went on a speaking tour of the western United States advocating for women's right to vote. Geffs edited The Living Issue to communicate labor issues. It was endorsed by the Knights of Labor. She published the book Under Ten Flags about the settlement of Weld County, Colorado in 1938.

== Early life ==
Mary L. Vanpelt was born in 1854 to Mary Ann Fuller Vanpelt and Cyprus Vanpelt, a farmer. She was raised in Union Township of Clinton County, Ohio with her brothers Fuller, David who became a judge, and Cyrus who was a minister. She received a good education.

== Marriage and children ==
Mary L. Vanpelt, at the age of 16, married Robert Geffs on November 24, 1870 in Clinton, Ohio, becoming Mary L. Geffs. Robert was born to Mary and Thomas Geffs on April 24, 1849 on a farm in Clinton County, Ohio. (Note: He is also said to have been born in 1851.) Geffs and her husband moved near Fort Scott in Bourbon County, Kansas in 1872 and Robert worked in the stock business. By March 1, 1875, they lived in Pawnee, Kansas and had a 2 year and 3 months old daughter, Inez, who was born in Ohio. Robert was elected to serve a term in the legislature in 1877. While on a road-trip to buy cattle, he was robbed of $2,200 (equivalent to $74,242 in 2024), which left him in financial distress. He was severely injured when his horse fell on him. In mid-May 1879, he returned to his parents' house near Sabina in Clinton County, Ohio upon hearing that his sister was ill. He died there May 23, 1879, believed to be due to the injuries he sustained when his horse fell on him.

In 1880, Geffs was a 26-year-old widow living in Pawnee, Kansas. She had four children Inez, Ernest, Osco, and Bessie, the eldest seven years of age and the youngest just 8 months old.

== Career and suffrage ==
After her husband's death, Geffs worked 10-hour days in Cincinnati sweatshops and at her residence in a cheap tenement. She sewed clothes to support herself and her children. Earning little, she was subject to eviction and she was worried that her children did not have enough to eat.

She studied economics and became a reporter and an activist for working class interests. She joined the Knights of Labor. From 1892 to 1894, Geffs investigated the conditions of working women and children for the state bureau of labor statistics of Ohio. She lost her job and the report she wrote was suppressed after she would not modify the report to better represent "business" interests. "The Sweating System", written by Geffs in 1893 was published in The Progressive Woman in 1910. In it, she describes how women worked from home, where they had children, but were paid so little that they needed to work long hours to eke out a poverty level wage. Women also worked in factories in unsafe and sweltering conditions, subject to illnesses from working in hot and close quarters.

She was a delegate from Ohio that attended the National Woman Suffrage Association convention of 1884 and 1894.

She moved west and was employed as a reporter for Denver newspapers, and augmented her income by sewing for others. In 1906, she joined the Socialist Party and sat on Colorado state executive and national committees. She became a campaign speaker in 1910. In 1912, she was a delegate to the Socialist Party convention in Indianapolis, Indiana. Her areas of interest were providing children a good education, abolishing the death penalty, and establishing qualification requirements for Socialist party candidates. She was sent by the party to Arizona in 1912 to speak about women's suffrage. The following year, she toured western states, including Washington, Oregon, Idaho, Utah, Wyoming, and Montana.

Geffs visited coal mining communities and she spoke of her findings to a group of women as they awaited word from the president following a request for federal troops following the Ludlow Massacre (1914). She asserted that pregnant women paid for and were forced to be attended to by corporate physicians. She claimed that babies died of "willful neglect" and if women tried to bring in other physicians, they were run out of the mining camps.

She campaigned for University of Colorado regent, state superintendent of public instruction, in 1910 for secretary of governor, and in 1918 for governor.

Geffs edited The Living Issue to communicate labor issues. It was endorsed by the Knights of Labor. She published the book Under Ten Flags about the settlement of Weld County, Colorado in 1938.

== Personal life and death ==
In 1900, she lived with her son Ernest and daughter Bessie on California Street in Denver. Geffs lived and worked out of 5075 Raleigh Street in 1910. In 1920, she was living with her daughter Bessie and son-in-law John Carlson's house in Eaton, Colorado. She lived at 5025 Tennyson Street in Denver in 1928. After having been ill for a year, she died at her daughter Bessie's house on November 8, 1939 at the age of 85.

== See also ==
- List of Colorado suffragists
