= Denver Woman's Press Club =

Denver social club for women writers

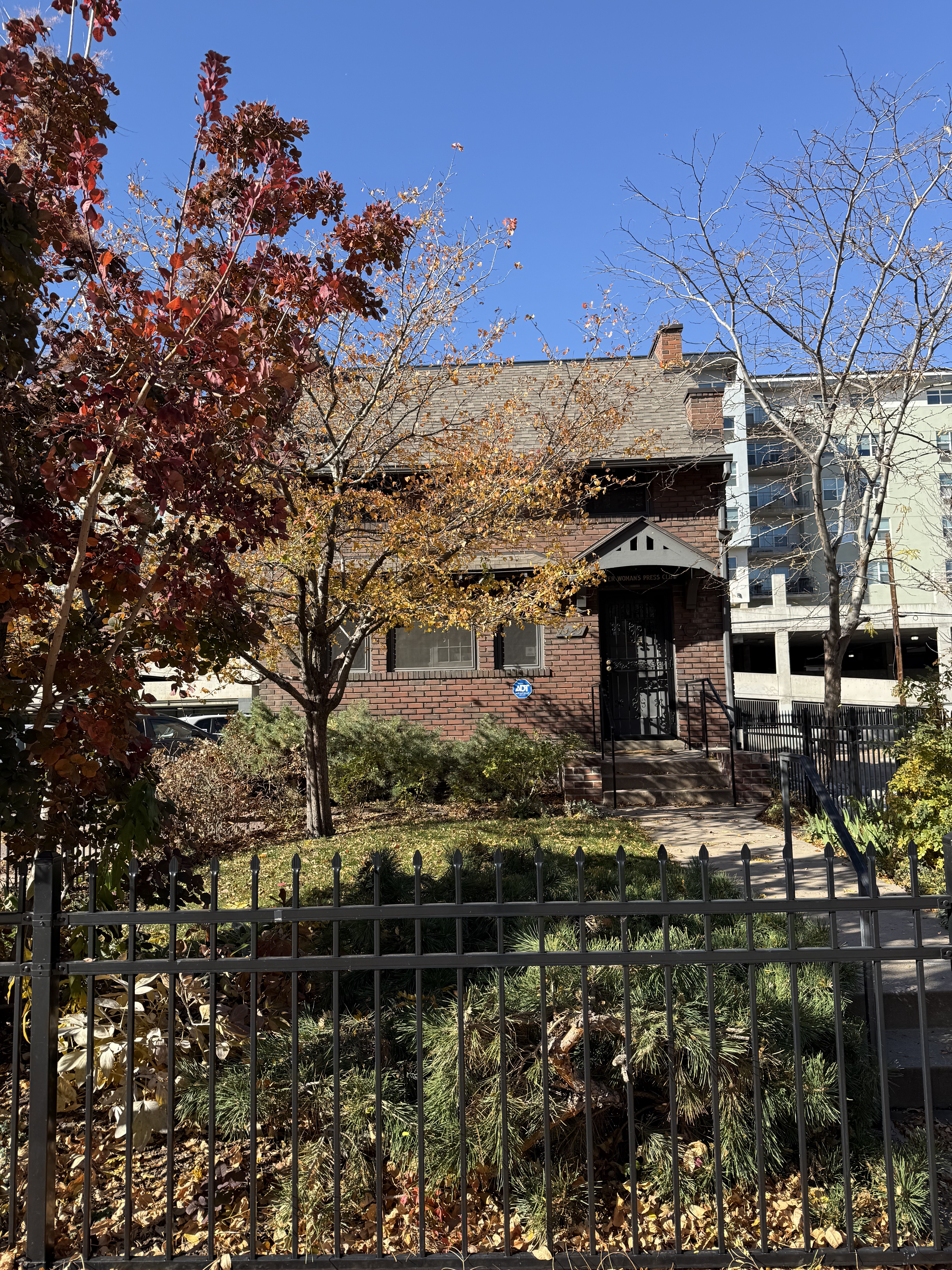
- Location: 1325 Logan Street, Capitol Hill, Denver, Colorado

History
- Built: 1910

Site notes
- Architect(s): Varian and Varian
- Architectural style: English cottage

The Denver Woman's Press Club (DWPC) was founded in March 1898 in Denver, Colorado by Minnie J. Reynolds. The Denver Woman's Press Club has served as a place where Colorado professional women writers, such as journalists and novelists, can gather, learn, and network.

== History ==
The club was created in response to a request from the General Federation of Women's Clubs. Minnie J. Reynolds, a writer for the Rocky Mountain News, was contacted by the General Federation of Woman's Clubs about holding their biennial conference in Denver in July 1898. Although a woman's press club did not truly exist in Denver yet, Minnie said there was such a club and that they could host the event. Minnie was known to use her position to advocate for women's rights and she hurried and gathered some peers together to create a press club. The founders rode their bicycles to a home in the Capitol Hill neighborhood where they created guidelines for the organization. Some criteria for admittance included were as noted:

"No woman shall be admitted to the club who is . . .

- A bore
- Who holds out on news reporters
- Who has not a proper respect for the power of the press
- Who does not read your paper
- Who cannot do something to drive dull care away.

Copy readers and proof readers are forever barred from membership of this club."

The club served as a place for women to gather and promote empowering ideals, such as suffrage. The organization is known for running contests for writers and aspiring writers.

In addition to professional writers, the organization also allows 'affiliate' members to join. Some well-known affiliate members have included Margaret Tobin Brown, Mary Elitch Long, and Elizabeth Sumner Byers.

In 1924, the organization moved into its current headquarters at 1325 Logan Street in Denver. This building, also known as the Burr House, is a Denver landmark and on the National Register of Historic Places.

In January 2024, the DWPC updated its bylaws to include men as members. The first male member is Ryan Warner.

== Notable members ==
- Margaret Tobin Brown, suffragist and Titanic survivor
- Elizabeth Sumner Byers, social reformer
- Alice Polk Hill, founder and poet laureate
- Mary Elitch Long, business woman
- Leonel Campbell Ross O'Bryan, aka Polly Pry, newspaper reporter
- Minnie J. Reynolds, founder, newspaper reporter, and activist
- Helen Ring Robinson, first female state senator (CO)
- Lucile Morris Upton, newspaper reporter
- Lenora Mattingly Weber, writer
- Helen Marsh Wixen, founder and first CO state superintendent of public instruction
