= Martha A. B. Conine =

American politician

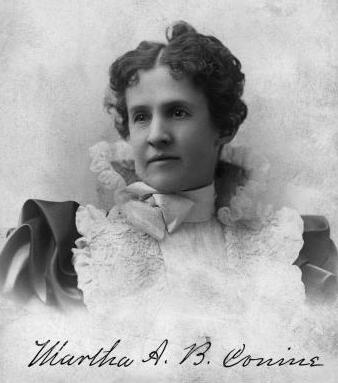
Martha A. B. Conine

Martha A. B. Conine was a state legislator in Colorado, a women's suffragist, and a leader of women's clubs. She was born in New York. She married J. M. Conine. She moved to Wisconsin and then Colorado. She served as president of the North Denver Women's Club.

She represented Arapahoe County in the Colorado House of Representatives. She supported passage of a primary nomination law.

She wrote to Mariana Wright Chapman (1849-1910). The Denver Public Library has an item related to her in its calling card collection.
