= Agnes Ludwig Riddle =

American politician (1865-1930)

- Born: 1865; Silesia, Germany
- Died: May 5, 1930 (aged 64–65); Englewood, Colorado
- Occupations: Nurse, farmer, Colorado politician
- Spouse: Joseph M. Riddle

Colorado State Representative
- In office 1911–1914

Colorado State Senator
- In office 1917–1920

Agnes Ludwig Riddle (born 1865 - died 5 May 1930) was an American politician who served as a member of the Colorado House of Representatives from 1911 to 1914 and in the Colorado Senate from 1917 to 1920. She was the first woman to serve in both chambers of the Colorado General Assembly.

== Biography ==
Agnes Ludwig was born in Germany around 1865.

She emigrated to the United States in 1882. She was a nurse and midwife, and worked at a hospital in Colorado before she married.

Agnes Ludwig met Joseph M. Riddle on July 15, 1890 in Denver, Colorado. The couple had no children of their own, but they adopted and raised six nieces and nephews.

=== Career ===
Riddle was the Secretary and Organizer for the Colorado State Grange, and strengthened the organization. They donated land to create Glendale Grange.

She worked with her husband on their dairy farm, and became known as the "dairy legislator" because she maintained her job delivering milk before going to the House of Representatives.

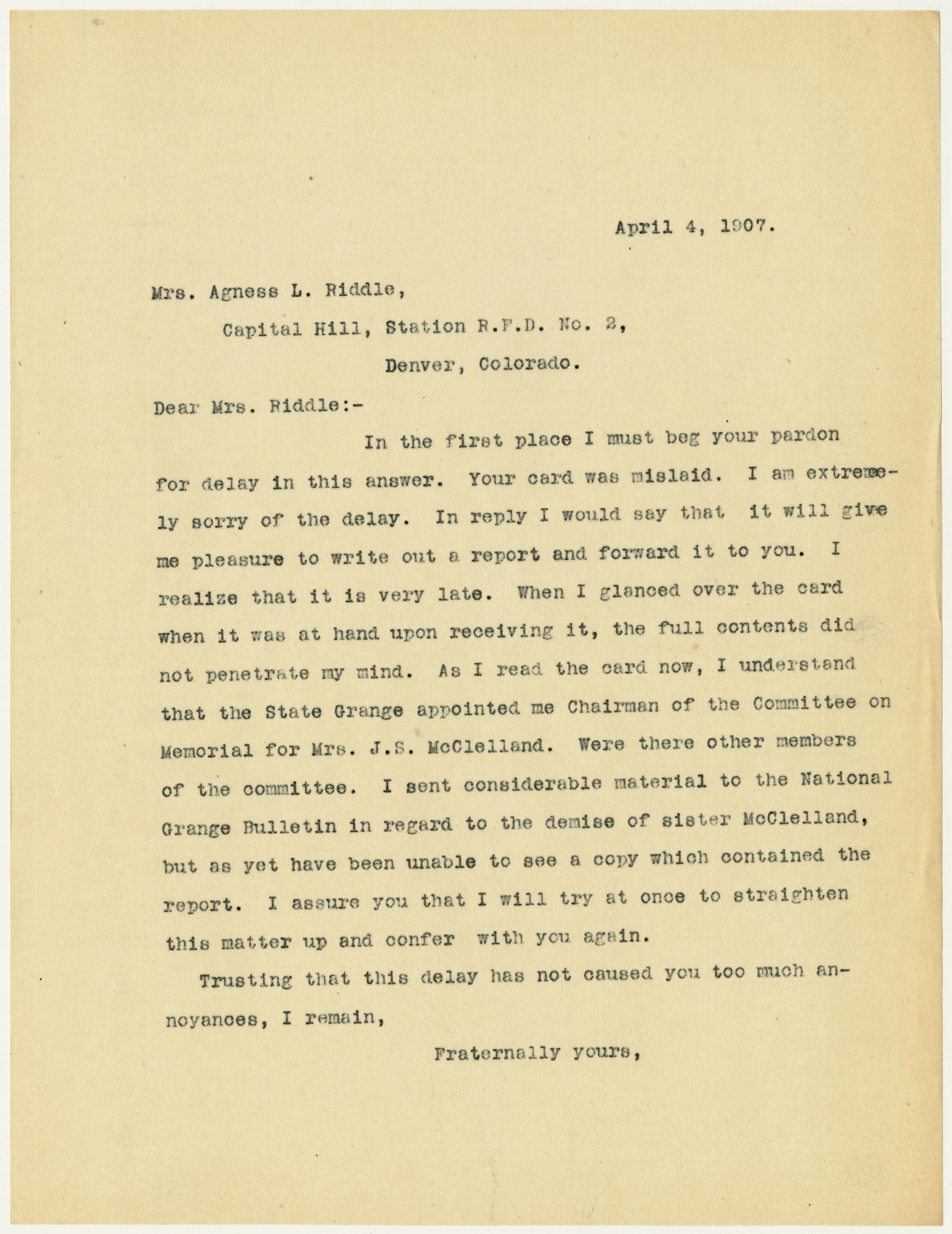
Letter from Theodosia Grace Ammons to Agnes Ludwig Riddle

Riddle was elected to the Colorado House of Representatives from 1911 to 1914, and was part of the 18th and 19th General Assemblies.

Riddle was elected to the Colorado Senate from 1917 to 1920, and represented district 22 including Adams, Arapahoe, Elbert, and Morgan counties. She was Colorado's second woman senator.

She opposed legislation to create a state police force. She was a fierce advocate of farmers and their families. She was on many committees that addressed labor, child welfare, dairy and farm improvements, and support for destitute mothers.

Riddle was a Republican, but had some progressive ideals. She established the National Anti-Klan party, and was the only woman Senator in the US to bring forth ratification of the 19th amendment to the US Constitution.

Riddle was tapped by President WIlson and US Food Administrator Hoover to aid in the World War II food problem. She was an excellent speaker and traveled across the state to teach methods of food preservation and conservation. She was an Executive Committee member of the Women's Council of Defense.

=== Death and legacy ===
Riddle died on May 5, 1930 in Englewood, Colorado. She is buried beside her husband at Fairmount Cemetery in Denver, Colorado.

In 2022, she was inducted into the Colorado Women's Hall of Fame.

== See also ==
- Timeline of women's suffrage in Colorado
