= Helen Ring Robinson =

American politician (1878–1923)

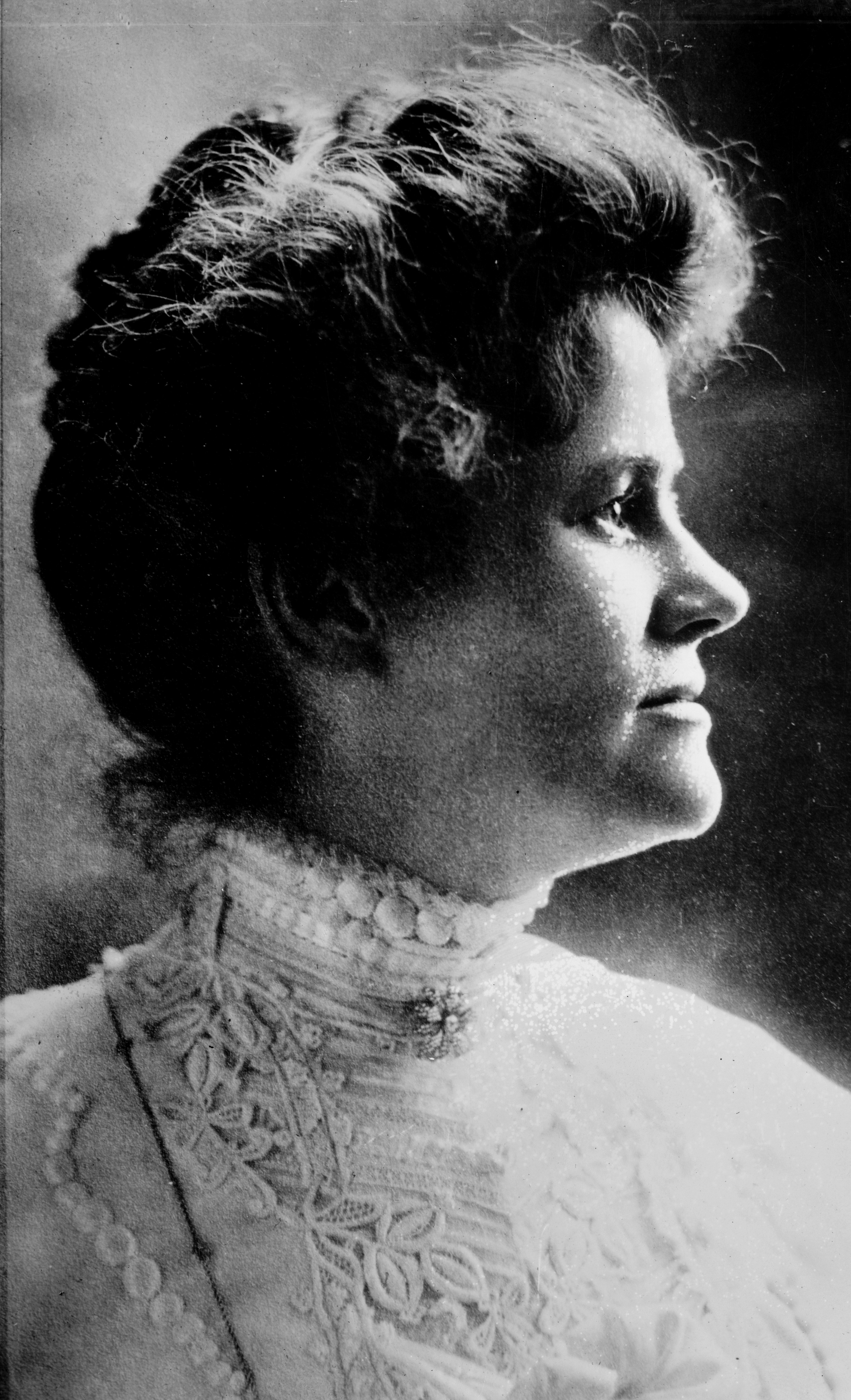
- Helen Ring Robinson circa 1913

Member of the Colorado Senate from the 1st district
- In office January 1, 1913 – January 3, 1917

Personal details
- Born: Helen Ring; 1878 Eastport, Maine, U.S.
- Died: 1923 (aged 44–45) Denver, Colorado
- Resting place: Fairmount Cemetery, Denver, Colorado
- Party: Democratic Party
- Spouse: Ewing Robinson (m. February 13, 1902)
- Parent(s): Thomas Warren Ring and Mary Margaret (Thompson) Ring
- Profession: Suffragist; Writer; Peace activist

Helen Ring Robinson (1878–1923), was an American suffragist, writer, and political office holder. She was the first woman to serve as a state senator in the United States and the first in the Colorado State Senate. She was elected in 1912 and began her service in the 19th Colorado General Assembly, when she was sworn in on January 1, 1913. She was inducted into the Colorado Women's Hall of Fame in 2014.

== Early life ==
Helen Ring Robinson was born in 1878 in Eastport, Maine. She grew up in New England and went to Wellesley College, a private women's liberal arts college in Wellesley, Massachusetts.

== Career ==
=== Educator ===
Robinson moved to Denver in 1895 and taught at Wolfe Hall until 1898, when she went to teach at the Wolcott School for Girls. It was established by a friend who also lived in Providence. It was during her time at Wolcott that she became acquainted with members of Denver society.

=== Journalist ===
She then began working in the newspaper industry. She spent ten years as a literary critic and editorial writer for the Rocky Mountain News and the Denver Times. Helen was an early member of the Denver Woman's Press Club.

=== Politics ===
After leading a crusade against Denver's poor water service, she was recruited to run for office. She was elected to the Colorado Senate for one four-year term in 1912, and took office in 1913. While in office, she was appointed chair of the Colorado State Senate Education Committee. As a state senator, Robinson traveled the country making speeches on women's issues. In 1915 she served as a speaker for the Fayette Equal Rights Association, giving presentations throughout central Kentucky on woman suffrage.

Among the progressive laws she passed were a minimum wage law for women and an abatement for property used for prostitution – both efforts to limit prostitution. Women were not allowed to serve on juries at that time, although women had received the vote in Colorado in 1893. All of Robinson's bills on this issue failed. Consequently, women could not serve on juries in the state until 1944.

== Personal life ==
She died in 1923. Her body lay in state in the Capitol rotunda before her service. She was buried at Fairmount Cemetery in Denver.

== See also ==
- Rebecca Latimer Felton, served in the United States Senate on November 22, 1922, for one day.

== Publications ==
- Preparing Women for Citizenship (1918)
- Uncle Tom's Cabin for Children by Harriet Beecher Stowe; adapted by Helen Ring Robinson. From the Collections at the Library of Congress
