= Grace Espy Patton =

Prof. Grace Espy Patton
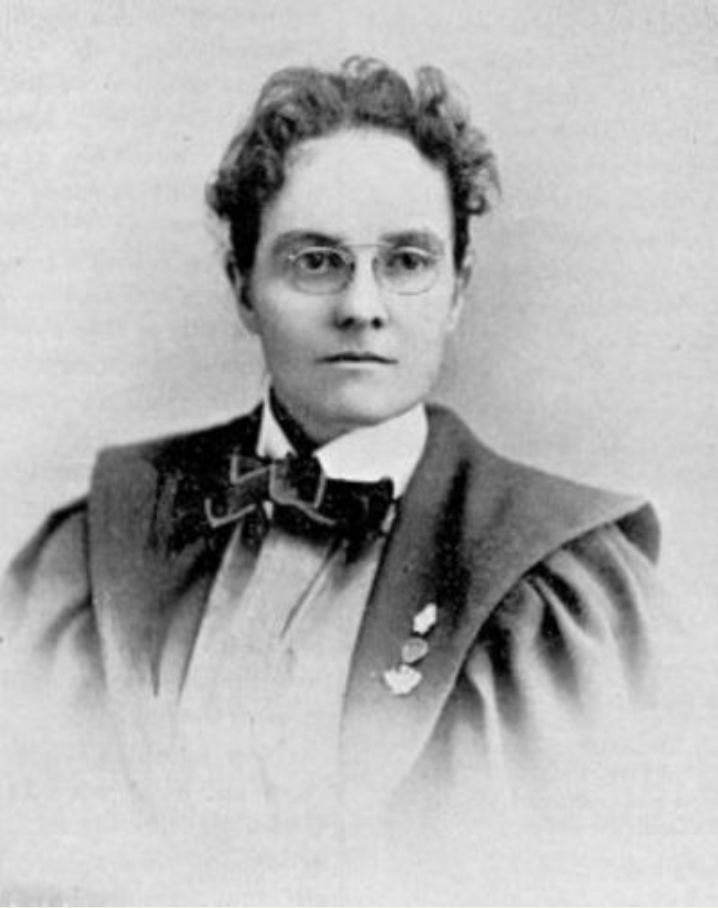
- Patton ca. 1896
- Born: October 5, 1866; Hartstown, Pennsylvania, U.S.
- Died: July 22, 1904 (aged 37); Fort Assinniboine, Montana, U.S.
- Burial place: Mount Olivet Cemetery
- Other name: Grace Patton-Cowles
- Education: Colorado State College
- Occupations: professor; state superintendent of schools; writer; publisher; clubwoman
- Employer: Colorado Agricultural College
- Known for: The only woman serving as state superintendent of schools in the United States in 1897.
- Notable work: Tourney (magazine); The Chalchihuitl (novel)
- Title: State superintendent of schools
- Term: 1897-98
- Political party: Democratic Party
- Spouse: Warren Hayden Cowles (m. 1898)

Signature
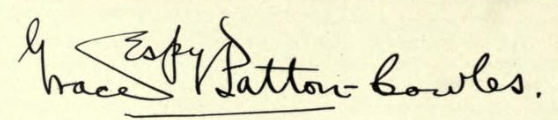

Grace Espy Patton (after marriage, Patton-Cowles; 1896–1904) was an American educator, writer, suffragist, and state superintendent of schools. Born in Pennsylvania, she moved to Colorado during childhood, where she made her career as a professor and public official. Patton taught modern languages at the Colorado Agricultural College (now Colorado State University) and founded the Tourney, a literary magazine. She became widely known as the first woman to serve as Colorado's State Superintendent of Public Instruction (1897–1898), a role that made her the only woman in the United States to hold such a position at the time, as well as the ex officio state librarian. Patton was active in Democratic politics and the women's suffrage movement, wrote both fiction and political pieces, and participated in national conventions as a lecturer and delegate. After her marriage to Warren Hayden Cowles, she engaged in Red Cross relief work during the Spanish-American War and traveled internationally before her death in Montana in 1904.

== Early life and education ==
Grace Espy (sometimes misspelled, "Espey") Patton was born in Hartstown, Pennsylvania on October 5, 1866. Her parents, the descendants of people associated with colonial history, had been citizens of that state. At the age of ten, she came with her parents to Colorado, they deciding to settle at Fort Collins. Grace's father, David Patton, served two years as mayor of Fort Collins. Grace had at least one sibling, a brother, Webb A., who became a newspaper man of Clear Creek County, Colorado.

In Fort Collins, she grew to adulthood and received her education. After her high school course, she entered the city's Colorado State College, where she was graduated in 1885 with the highest honors and the degree of Bachelor of Science.

In 1896, the degree of Master of Science was conferred by Colorado State Agricultural College.

== Career ==
=== Miss Patton ===
After graduation, she was at once offered and accepted the position of instructor at Colorado State Agricultural College, and for, six years, she served on that faculty (1885–1891). In 1891, she was appointed to the chair of English and Sociology at the college, teaching for another twelve years in this period, while also contributing to leading newspapers and magazines.

Patton established and edited the Tourney, a monthly literary paper devoted to sociology that was read throughout the U.S.

In January 1894, she came to Denver, moving her magazine and publishing it from this city, though in September of that year, it was being published in Fort Collins. Changes in name, management, scope, and publishing city were announced in November. Patton would continue to serve as editor of The Colorado Woman, published in Denver, but Mary C. C. Bradford was added as the associate editor in charge of the Club department. With a focus on women's interests and women's club work, the best literary talent in the state was to be represented in the new periodical's columns, with the first issue due out on December 15, 1894. The periodical's new sponsor was the Colorado State Equal Suffrage League (CSESL), an organization that only existed for two years.

In 1895, Patton became president of the Colorado Women's Democratic Club. When women were made citizens of Colorado, Patton allied herself with the Democratic party. Her oratorical talents were of great service to her party, and her keen sense of humor insured her a cordial reception wherever she appeared. As president of the Colorado Women's Democratic Club, Patton was the most prominent woman in her party, and the Democratic state convention that met at Pueblo before the election of 1896 gave her a unanimous nomination for superintendent of public instruction. She was endorsed by the Silver Republican Party, and went into office with a big majority.

Patton's romance novel, The Chalchihuitl, was published in 1896. The mythical story was based on the legend of the search for the mystic stone, the Chalchihuitl, by an Aztec princess.

In January 1897, Patton assumed the office of Superintendent of Public Instruction, which she held even after marriage. The department of public instruction in Colorado carried with it many diverse duties. The Superintendent was a member of the State Land Board of Education. Patton consequently had jurisdiction over fifty-six counties, 1,500 districts, and over 3,000 teachers. She was expected to visit each school at least once a year. She had a deputy and a clerk to assist her in the routine work, which was voluminous. Her travels to different schools were not always by rail, but often on horseback, by stagecoach, or by ranch wagon. In order to become acquainted with the best methods employed for the care of defective classes, Patton visited State institutions in Nebraska and Illinois. Her experience helped her to make her administration of great help to the school interests of the state. The establishment of school libraries, the extension of the kindergarten system and the general introduction of manual training received special attention. Schoolroom decoration was also one of the Patton's chief reforms; she published a pamphlet on this subject, as well as one on libraries and their management. At Chattanooga, Tennessee, in 1898, she attended the national convention of the State superintendents of public instruction, and was invited to be presiding officer.

Patton's writing on behalf of women's suffrage was characterized as being "clever and caustic". In 1896, she served as state auditor of the Suffrage Association. Advocating for giving the franchise to women, she worked with all her influence to bring that about, and it was in this campaign that her power as an orator was developed. On the platform, Patton was a favorite with Colorado audiences. At the national suffrage convention of February 1898, in Washington, D.C., Susan B. Anthony introduced Patton. It was the first time Patton had ever delivered a speech outside of her State. She was supposed to talk on the "New Education", but declined to do so, owing to the limited time at her disposal. Instead, she gave another, stirring speech.

=== Mrs. Cowles ===
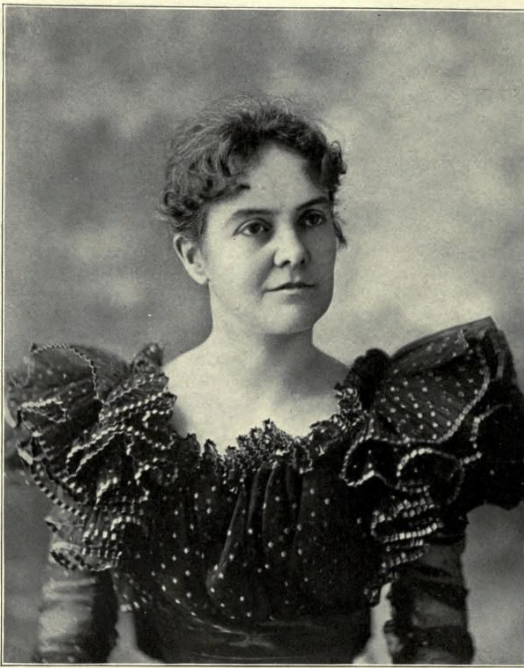
Patton in 1899

"there should be a physical as well as a mental qualification required of teachers." (Grace Espy Patton Cowles, The School Journal, 1898)

In April 1898, in Chicago, she married Warren Hayden Cowles, of the U.S. Army, though the friendship between the two had originated long before in the Agricultural College, where both were instructors. Following her marriage, Patton wrote and spoke frequently, being in demand at national women's conventions and recognized as one of the leaders among women for many reforms of her era.

Captain Cowles was serving with the Fourth United States Infantry while it was stationed at Fort Logan. The regiment was then ordered to Fort Sheridan and Patton, the bride of a day, was left in Denver. The Spanish–American War took the regiment to Cuba, and Patton came to Chicago in time to see her husband one moment on the train. She returned to Denver, where she lived while her husband was in Cuba. Soon after the outbreak of the war, Patton was in the head office of the Red Cross Society in New York City. She was eager to take an active hand in helping the wounded soldiers who were them commencing the Cuban campaign. Her request to that effect was granted, and she was soon at the scene of the battle. She remained in Cuba for two months, assisting the sick and wounded in the different camps, returning to the U.S. in June 1899.

In 1899, in Denver, Patton organized the "Non-Sentimental Club". Its motto was: "Woman should not wear her heart on her sleeve".

The regiment returned with Captain Cowles safe, but before he could be joined by Patton, the troops were ordered to Manila, and Patton reached Chicago again only in time to say good-by to her departing husband on the train. When the war broke out in the Philippines, Patton was offered a post at that place by the Red Cross. She left San Francisco on the transport with the Twentieth Kansas regiment, remaining in the general hospital in Manila for a time, but at her own request, was assigned to field duty. After becoming ill, she returned to the U.S., and, accompanied by her friends, headed to the Red Cross general headquarters at New York.

Later, Patton accompanied her husband to the Philippines, where she planned to write a few press letters on life among the army women of Manila. They returned to the U.S. in 1903 in order for Patton to be hospitalized and treated in Denver for "nervous troubles".

== Death and legacy ==
Patton left for northern Montana in June 1904, her husband serving as major the couple made a trip to the Philippines. of the Twenty-fourth infantry at Fort Assinniboine, one of the largest of the U.S. army posts in that time. She died at Fort Assinniboine on July 22, 1904. Patton was buried in Mount Olivet Cemetery in the Archdiocese of Denver.

The Grace Espy Patten Cowles Collection, 1863-1935 is held by Stephen H. Hart Library & Research Center at the History Colorado Center.

== Selected works ==
=== Novels ===
- The Chalchihuitl (1896)

=== Literary journals ===
- Tourney (1894-)
