= Mabel Ruth Baker =

American politician

Mabel Ruth Baker (1880 - 19??) was an American politician. She was a state legislator in Colorado, serving multiple terms.

Baker was believed to have been born on December 6, 1880, to Stephen Franklin and Irene Willard. Although she was noted as Mrs. Mabel Ruth Baker in The Woman Citizen of February 1920, the identity of her purported husband remains unknown.

In 1919, Baker was elected with one other woman, Dr. May F. Bigelow, as representatives in the Colorado Assembly. From 1919 to 1924, Baker served in the Colorado House of Representatives as a Republican.

Baker was a sponsor of education bills including the requirement of an oath to be taken by teachers and for teacher pay. A Republican, she lived in Denver.
