= Ellis Meredith =

American novelist (1865–1955)

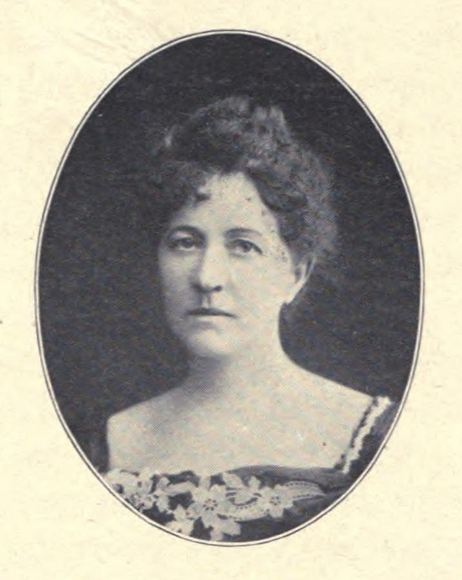
- Ellis Meredith in 1902
- Born: 1865; Montana Territory, United States
- Died: 1955 (aged 89–90)
- Occupations: Suffragist; journalist; novelist
- Employer(s): Rocky Mountain News (1893–1917); Women's Bureau of the Democratic Party
- Spouses: Howard S. Stansbury (m. 1889; div. 1901) Henry H. Clement (m. 1913)

Ellis Meredith (1865–1955) was an American suffragist, journalist, and novelist, known as the Susan B. Anthony of Colorado.

== Early years ==
Ellis Meredith was born in Montana Territory in 1865 to Frederick Allison and Emily R. Sorin Meredith. Her mother graduated from Hamline University at Saint Paul, Minnesota in 1859 and received her master's degree in 1863. Her father was the editor of the Red Wing Republican when they were married. The Merediths were settlers of Bannack by the winter of 1862–1863 when they traveled by wagon to Bitterroot Valley in southwestern Montana. Ellis, her mother and brother, went to her grandfather's house in De Soto, Missouri, for some time. In 1885, she moved to Denver with her family, where her father was a printer and later managing editor of the Rocky Mountain News. Her mother was the first journalist in Denver when she began writing for the paper in 1886. She was also a suffragist.

== Career ==
=== Suffrage movement ===
In 1890 she and five other women founded the Colorado Non-Partisan Equal Suffrage Association. In 1893 she went to the Woman's Congress at the Chicago World's Fair in August 1893 to ask for help from Susan B. Anthony and Lucy Stone, leading suffrage activists, saying, "If Colorado goes for woman suffrage, you may count on a landslide in that direction throughout the west." Susan B. Anthony agreed to send organizer Carrie Chapman Catt to help, and Meredith wrote to Anthony about the situation in Colorado while Carrie Chapman Catt traveled around Colorado organizing.

=== Journalist and author ===
She joined the Rocky Mountain News in 1893. She began writing the column A Woman's World for the Rocky Mountain News in 1889, where she (among other things) advocated women's suffrage. In 1894 she became part of the editorial staff of the Rocky Mountain News, where was the first female journalist in Colorado, and probably the United States, to cover the legislature.

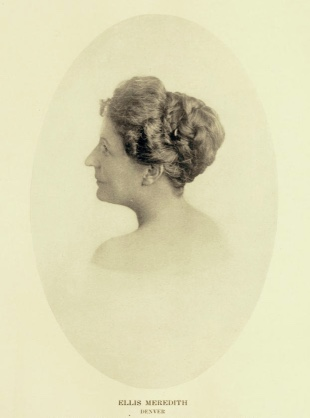
Ellis Meredith, Representative Women of Colorado, 1914

Meredith also wrote three novels - The Master Knot of Human Fate (1901), Heart of My Heart (1904), and Under the Harrow (1907).

=== Politics ===
On November 7, 1893, the men of Colorado voted for women's suffrage and Meredith stayed involved in politics. In 1902, she helped write Denver's first city charter as one of only was four female delegates to the Denver City Charter convention. She was the vice chair of the Democratic Party State Central Committee from 1904 until 1908, and in February 1904 she became one of the people from Colorado to testify to the House of Representatives' Committee on the Judiciary in favor of the suffrage amendment. The first woman elected to office in Denver, she became City Election Commissioner in 1910 and served in that role until 1915. In 1917 she moved to Washington, D.C. to work at the National Democratic headquarters.

== Personal life ==
Meredith was married in 1889 to Howard S. Stansbury and they divorced in 1901. She married Henry H. Clement in 1913. She moved to Washington, D.C. in 1917 to take a job with the Women's Bureau of the Democratic Party and continued to be an active member of the Woman's National Democratic Club.

She died in 1955. The Ellis Meredith Papers are held in the Colorado Historical Society in Denver, Colorado. Meredith was inducted into the Colorado Women's Hall of Fame in 2018.
