= Queen Bee (newspaper) =

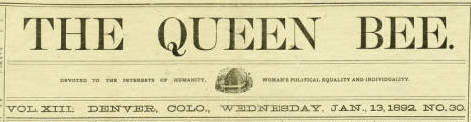
The Queen Bee heading, January 13, 1892

The Queen Bee, formerly known as The Colorado Antelope was an American journal dedicated to women's rights. The paper was founded by Caroline Nichols Churchill in Denver in 1879. The Antelope came out monthly until 1882, when Churchill moved to a weekly format and renamed the paper the Queen Bee. The paper was popular and was praised by Susan B. Anthony. Both papers covered various issues, including women's suffrage, race, and had a strong pro-feminist stance. Churchill continued to publish the paper until a few months before she died in 1926.

== History ==
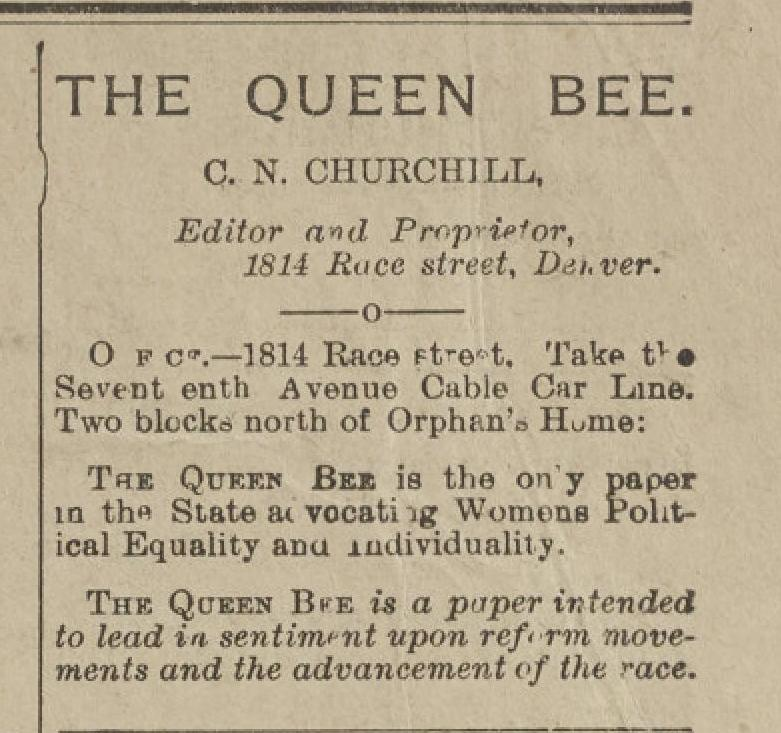
The Queen Bee was "devoted to the interests of humanity, woman's political equality and individuality" (masthead). This issue, "No. 10" was likely issued in the first decade of the 20th century, followed cessation of its weekly publication prior to 1895

Caroline Nichols Churchill founded The Colorado Antelope in Denver in 1879. The paper was published with her own money at 386 Holladay Street and the first edition came out in October. She wrote the paper for women and had a small staff made up of women. Churchill even traveled on her own throughout frontier regions to sell the paper. She chose the name because she felt that antelopes were "alive, active, and hard to take down." The motto of the paper was "Come let us reason together."The Colorado Antelope was published monthly until 1882.

The Queen Bee started on July 5, 1882 and was published weekly. That year, the paper had a circulation of around 2,500 readers. Churchill traveled throughout the West to promote the paper and gather news to write about. Churchill continued to publish the paper until 1926, a few months before she died.

== About ==
The Colorado Antelope was a three-column paper that sold for $1.50 a year. The heading of the paper read "Devoted to the Interests of Humanity, Woman's Political Equality and Individuality." The Queen Bee had an unusual format with the first page of the paper populated with epigrams and mottoes in the left-hand column. Churchill also added poems and stories throughout the news she printed. Both papers were sold to subscribers and also in bookstores in Denver.

Both papers expressed Churchill's philosophy of equal rights for women. Churchill's vocal feminism was expressed in the paper. The paper promoted the work of women in business and urged readers in Denver to boycott businesses that mistreated women. Her papers were pro-women's suffrage. She also wrote an advice column on various topics for young women. Churchill also addressed issues of race and was often supportive of minority groups, such as Chinese immigrants, though she was less supportive of various Native American tribes.

== Reception ==
Both papers were criticized by the community. However, they were also very popular among women readers and a few men. One woman wrote, "I could not do without your paper." Susan B. Anthony praised the Colorado Antelope in 1881.
