= Margaret W. Campbell =

American suffragist (b. 1827, d. 1908)

Margaret W. Campbell (January 16, 1827-November 5, 1908) was an American women's suffrage advocate.

== Personal life ==
Campbell was born in Hancock County, Maine, on January 16, 1827. She attended the district schools there. She moved to Iowa in 1857, locating in Linn County. During the American Civil War, she was active in soldiers' aid societies.

== Suffragist ==
As early as 1850, her attention was called to the subject of women's suffrage by reading the proceedings of the first Woman's Rights Convention held in Worcester, Massachusetts. She soon became a firm believer in the reform but did not enter the field as a worker until 1863. It was at this time made her first public speeches in the suffrage cause, writing also on the subject for the newspapers.

In 1869, she was sent as a delegate to the convention of the American Woman Suffrage Association at Cleveland, Ohio. From this time on, Campbell became one of the prominent public speakers in the cause in New England and New York. For more than 20 years she was an officer of the American Woman Suffrage Association and for a long time was connected with the Woman's Journal. She was associated with Lucy Stone, Julia Ward Howe, Susan B. Anthony, and other national leaders in the reform, often speaking with them at conventions in various states.

As she toured the country working for the cause, her husband, a painter, often painted portraits to cover their expenses.

=== Massachusetts ===
In February 1869, she attended a suffrage convention at Springfield, Massachusetts, where a number of the national leaders were among the speakers. Here Campbell made an eloquent address which attracted general attention. At one point in her life, she lived in Springfield.

In 1870, Campbell was a delegate to the state convention of the Massachusetts Woman Suffrage Association. She organized women's suffrage societies in Berkshire, Essex, Hampden, Plymouth, and Worcester Counties.

=== Iowa ===
In November 1879, Campbell settled in Iowa and continued active in the suffrage cause, taking part in all of the state campaigns. She was four years president of the State Suffrage Association and for two years corresponding secretary.

=== Michigan ===
She worked with American Woman Suffrage Association to attempt to amend the Michigan Constitution to allow women to vote, in 1874 but it was defeated, 136,000-40,000.

=== Colorado ===
In 1875, it became increasingly likely that the United States Congress would admit Colorado as the 38th state. Campbell moved to the territory, spending much of 1875 and 1876 trying to convince the Colorado constitutional convention to give women the right to vote. On January 10, 1876, she helped organize a women's suffrage convention at Unity Church in Denver. It was timed to coincide with the convention drafting a constitution for the territory, and was publicized with pamphlets placed on the desks of territorial legislators and delegates to the constitutional convention. The convention established the Territorial Woman Suffrage Society, the precursor to the Non-Partisan Equal Suffrage Association.

The convention did not grant women the right to vote, but it did agree to hold a referendum on the issue in 1877. Campbell returned to work on that campaign, giving lectures to drunken miners in small schoolhouses and on the banks of rivers. To get to some locations, she traveled up the sides of mountains on a "sure-footed little burro" along dangerous trails where they could have plunged thousands of feet to their deaths. Despite her efforts, the referendum failed by a margin of nearly two-to-one.

=== Other states ===
Campbell spent much of 1872 in Maine, organizing the Maine Women Suffrage Association. She then spent two years organizing in Michigan, Illinois, Indiana, Iowa, Nebraska, Colorado. She then returned to work in New England before focusing her attentions on Iowa, Indiana, and Nebraska.

== Later years and death ==
In 1901, she removed to Joliet, Illinois. She died there in 1908, with the funeral services held at the home of her son, George.

== Works cited ==
Berenson, Barbara F. (9 April 2018). Massachusetts in the Woman Suffrage Movement: Revolutionary Reformers. History Press. ISBN 978-1-4671-1862-0.
