= Caroline M. Churchill =

American journalist (1833–1926)

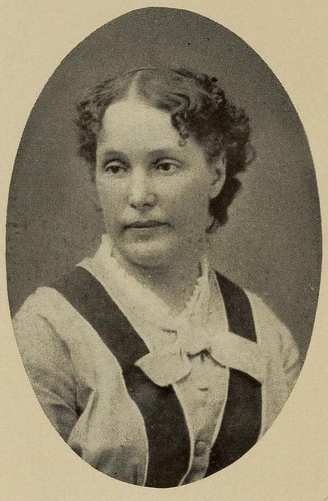
- Caroline M. Churchill (ca. 1873–74)
- Born: Caroline Maria Nichols; December 23, 1833; Pickering, Upper Canada
- Died: 1926
- Occupations: editor of the feminist newspaper The Queen Bee; writer of travel literature; suffragist
- Writing career
- Pen name: C. M. Churchill

Caroline Maria Nichols Churchill (née Nichols; pen name, C. M. Churchill; December 23, 1833 – 1926) was a Canadian-born writer and newspaper editor in the United States, best known as the editor of the Queen Bee, a feminist publication prominent during the Colorado Suffrage movement. As a travel writer and editor, Churchill aimed to promote female independence in the post Civil War West, culminating ultimately in the right to vote in the state of Colorado. Her publications Over the Purple Hills, Over the Evergreen Hills, and Little Sheaves detailed the growth of California as well as her experiences in Texas, Missouri, Kansas, Indian Territory and later Colorado. In 1988, she was inducted into the Colorado Women's Hall of Fame.

== Early life ==
Caroline (nickname, "Kate") Maria Nichols was born in 1833 in Pickering, Upper Canada, located about 40 miles from Toronto. Not much is known about her immediate family apart from the fact that her parents were Americans. Her father was a prosperous tradesman who was nearly 50 at the time of her birth. Her formal schooling was very limited, amounting to several months to one year at most. She was mainly a self-taught learner who spent the long winters reading or sewing and mending for families in the nearby area.

== Move to Minnesota (1857–62) ==
In the early 1850s, she married a man she referred to only as "Mr. Churchill". In 1857, Churchill and her young family moved to Minnesota for what she called the five longest years of her life. Outside St. Cloud, she lived an isolated pioneer life of a frontierswoman, experiencing Native American raids and warfare. Once while teaching in a rural school, she and others took shelter from an Indian attack. During the long months, she became an avid reader of the editor and Washington Correspondent Jane Grey Swisshelm, whom she later credited in The Queen Bee for opening her eyes to "the wrongs in which women suffer from the absolute power of the ruling class".

Mr. Churchill died in 1862, leaving her in poor health with a young daughter. In her 1909 autobiography, Active Footsteps, she refers to her coughing fits and weak lungs; some commenters on her life have taken this to mean she had tuberculosis, but it may have been another condition such as allergies. She believed, as many physicians did at the time, that "outdoor life was the only means in which even fair health could be obtained," and she and her daughter moved west to California to seek a milder climate. Churchill most certainly used her allergies to leave a traditional and rigid domestic setting in order to lead a life outside of traditional means.

== Travel writing (1869–79) ==
In 1869, Churchill left her daughter with her sister and moved to California to seek a profession as a travel writer and a milder climate that might relieve her health problems. Her writings from this period covered travels in Texas, Missouri, Kansas, Indian Territory, and especially California. For Churchill, this profession allowed her to make a cultural contribution to a mainly male-dominated literary world.

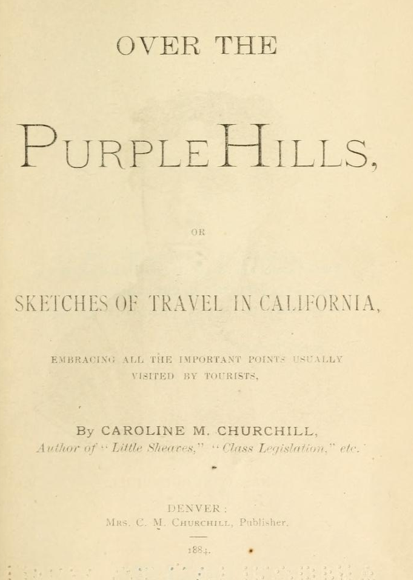
Title page of Churchill's 1884 essay collection

=== Published books ===
Before her work as an editor, Churchill was known as a travel writer and roving essayist. Her published works, Little Sheeves (1874) and Over the Purple Hills, or Sketches from Travel in California (1883) give illustrations of her experiences travel as an unaccompanied woman in the post-Civil War West.

The publication of Little Sheeves and Over the Purple Hills marked the emergence of Churchill as a public persona and literary figure, an area usually restricted to women. Her works and opinions broadened the public opinion of social ideas of what women of a certain social class could accomplish. As one of the first female travelers, she pioneered and vocalized freedoms for women before her work on legal enfranchisement began.

Her final published book was her autobiography, Active Footsteps, which detailed her life in Minnesota, her travels in the west, and her work in Colorado. Not much is known about her personal life, other than what is divulged in Active Footsteps. '

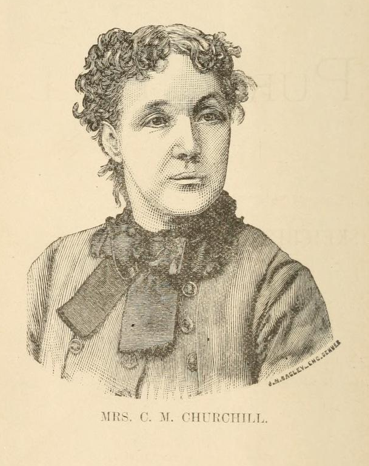
Artist sketch from Over the Purple Hills

=== Travels in the West ===
During her time in California, Churchill's ideologies of equal treatment and feminist suffrage first began to take a political turn. She began to understand the effectiveness, as well as importance, of direct political action. She worked to overturn an 1872 San Francisco bill that punished prostitutes but excluded any consequences for their male clientele. Churchill wrote and presented a counter-bill that overturned the previous ruling page. She became well known in the area, and was offered a permanent position at The Pioneer by editor Emily Pitts-Stevens but turned down the job. Through her writing and its application to politics, Churchill realized that she could promote reforms for women, and could move other women to action through her writing.

Her works included essays, poems, and general sketches of the area. She also consistently lectured on manners and morals, often relating to women's rights as citizens. In her sketches of the area, she also took industries to task that did not treat women fairly. In one short essay, she created a set of rules regulating boarding houses in response to their poor treatment of women traveling alone – largely in response to injustices suffered by women traveling alone, including charging more for a room or sleeping in a bed-bug infested bed.

=== Growing sympathy ===
Her travels further exposed her to the lives and conditions of other races and ethnic groups in the West. Her legacy as a writer and editor is not only in pursuit of suffrage for women, but as an early voice of equal treatment for many immigrant and minority groups, including the Chinese and Native Americans, specifically the Ute tribe. While traveling in Yosemite National Park, she witnessed a white trail guide beating a Chinese worker, whom she confronted. While many westerners held negative views of Chinese immigrants, Churchill remained a defender of their rights in her writings throughout her life. Her writing reflected a belief that all peoples should have an equal opportunity to lead a life free from bodily harm and repression.

== The Queen Bee and women's newspapers ==
=== Settling in Colorado and the Colorado Antelope ===
Churchill decided after her years of travel that she would permanently settle in California. However, traveling back from Chicago in 1879 to arrange publication of Purple Hills, she stopped to rest in Denver and decided that Colorado was the place for her to live. In Denver, she found a population – both male and female – who showed interest in progressive ideas on women's issues, which prompted her to begin her newspaper the same year. She used the byline "C.M. Churchill" for all her articles in this newspaper.

Bless your heart my dear sir, do you not know that all this stuff about woman's sphere is local twaddle ... A woman's sphere is to seek every good place and good thing in life and to shun the evil and bad. A man's sphere is no more nor no less.

— Caroline Churchill, Colorado Antelope, December 1879

She named her paper Colorado Antelope, which was supposed to mimic the forward strides of the movement toward Women's suffrage in the United States by describing a small animal that was hard to catch. The motto of the paper, "Come let us reason together," showed Churchill's attitudes on women's rights in the nineteenth century, and expressed her dedication to the "interests of humanity, woman's political equality and individually."

The paper was – as declared by Churchill – an instant success, after selling twenty-five hundred copies in the first three months and thus was able to reduce the subscription price from one dollar and fifty cents to one dollar a year.

=== The Queen Bee ===
In 1882, Churchill changed the title of her newspaper to the moniker The Queen Bee a name that represented her as much as her publication, as the editor and majority voice of the newspaper. The paper had grown in circulation, and Churchill was able to increase publications from monthly to weekly editions.

Each paper consisted of many of the same types of writings featured in her travel literature, and also included stories relating to women from other newspapers. Churchill consistently used her platform to editorialize her experience as a female traveler and specifically female journalist; she believed that most publications were specific to the needs and rights of men, not women.

The popularity of her paper prevented her from writing more books, although Churchill still traveled extensively in the Colorado area to promote her paper, seek advertisers, and even deliver papers herself to remote corners of the state.

While extremely popular among suffrage and liberal circles, Churchill was met with mixed reviews from many other journalistic agencies in the west. She did not shy away from challenging many male editors and their political positions from papers across the American West. These challenges varied from scathing reports to humorous adversaries, such as Dave Day from the Solid Muldroon, with whom she carried on a friendly and satirical correspondence. However, the Colorado Press Association as of 1881 refused to admit Churchill as an editor of distinction. While initially confident that she would reapply, her autobiography years later noted that she refused to have anything to do with them after.

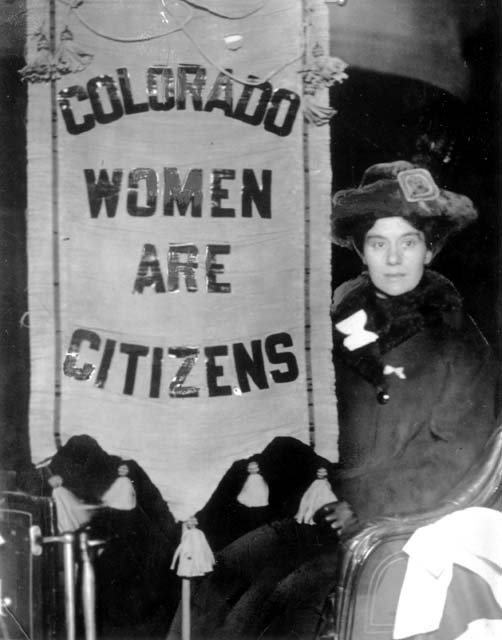
Colorado Women Crusading for Equal Rights

== Suffrage activities ==
The late nineteenth century in Colorado was host to a number of forces that ultimately led to suffrage – including the Women's Christian Temperance Union, the Farmer's Alliance populist political party, the merger of NWSA and AWSAA into NAWSA. However, what was most influential in regards to Churchill was that by 1890 in Colorado, most women met in cities and were able to meet and discuss the incendiary topics she frequently discussed in The Queen Bee. Social democratic politics in the west was focused on suffrage, temperance, and populism – such as the Farmer's Alliance – in which Churchill consistently challenged, questioned, and at times affirmed.

Churchill and her writings that demanded equal suffrage were similar, but far more critical than most of the sentiments expressed by many of the women's clubs in Colorado at the time. Many of these clubs who aimed for suffrage practiced a "domestic ideology", or maintain that there were separate spheres of influence and importance for men and women. These clubs recognized the failings of the first suffrage referendum in 1887 – when the Colorado Constitution was first written and enfranchisement to women denied – and sought to align their politics with the voting body of men – keeping quite on any individual racial sentiments regarding the vast number of ethnic populations in the state.

One man said to me not long since, 'You must not champion the Chinaman, if you want help here'. Said I, 'Brother, I should be an American citizen if I were not a woman, and a slave to the trousers of the country, but I am partially free, and struggling for my freedom, and I shall take the liberty to champion whom and what I please, and your royal highness will be obliged to stand it, and with no back talk

— Caroline Churchill, The Queen Bee, October 1892

Churchill was willing to not only question the racial subtext which underlay the women's suffrage movement, but to constantly question, challenge, and applaud the actions of men in the state of Colorado. While she did not challenge any individual's right to suffrage, Churchill was critical of many racial groups – often targeting men's actions. While she was sympathetic to the hardships of many immigrant populations – most vocally the Chinese – she routinely challenged Anglo-American men for their drinking and violence, as well as their involvement against female enfranchisement. While her support of immigrant populations was groundbreaking, many women's suffrage groups thought she was too outspoken, and that criticizing different male groups hurt the overall chances of state suffrage. Her relationship with the Colorado Women's Christian Temperance Union, considered a major force behind suffrage, was rocky because Churchill was wary of women working on behalf of the male-dominated Church. This distrust in the church led to many more critical articles regarding the church, including her harshly unsympathetic views towards Mexican immigrants, on which she blamed a negative Catholic influence.

Throughout the entire suffrage movement, leading up to the 1893 Colorado women's suffrage referendum, Churchill continued to speak her mind, even if it was against the general practices of many women campaigning for the vote – she was insistent that she would not "curry favor" to the larger majority. While she remained an outsider of the movement, she continued to vocalize her thoughts and often, pioneering support for immigrants who were continually mistreated or abused.

== Later life ==
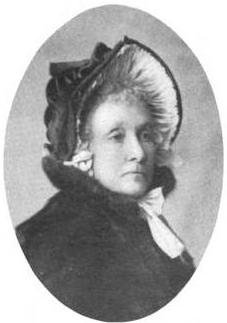
Caroline Churchill (1909)

Churchill's fame was most noted up to the suffrage amendment in Colorado in 1893. After women gained the right to vote, subscriptions for The Queen Bee declined. Churchill ceased to be a public presence or persona, and the last of her known efforts are pleas for more readers in 1895, when she announced a brief hiatus of the publication. The Queen Bee did not print another issue.

Aside from her public persona and writings, little is known about Churchill's personal life in Colorado or elsewhere. Historians are unclear about many facts in her later life. Today, Churchill is celebrated by western historians as a key figure in the western suffrage movement and a pioneer as a female journalist.

== Selected works ==
- Little Sheeves (1874)
- Over the Purple Hills, or Sketches from Travel in California (1883)
- Active Footsteps (1909)
