= Esquire Theatre (Denver) =

Historic movie theater in Denver, Colorado, US

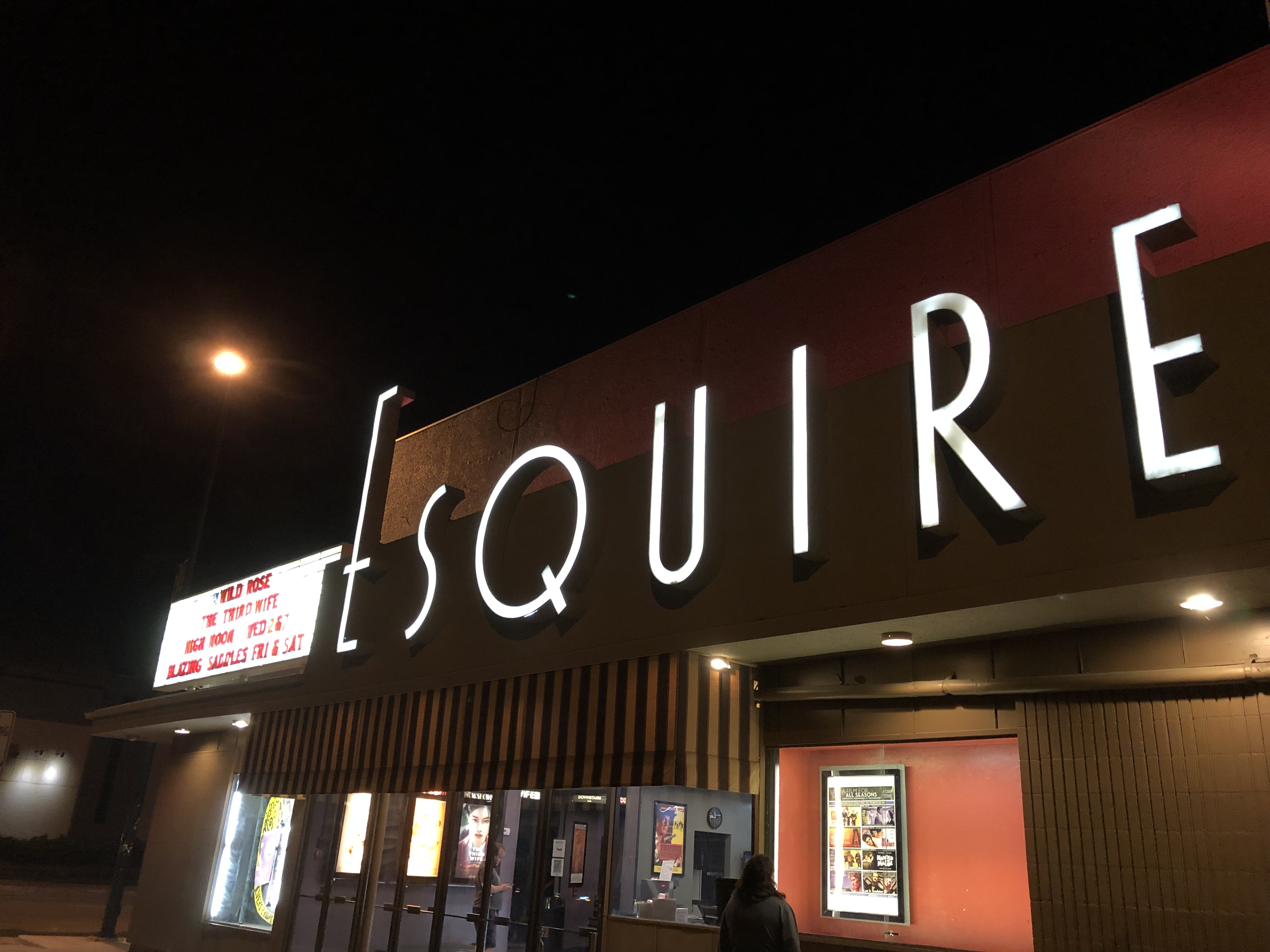
- Esquire Theatre, Denver, Colorado. July 12, 2019. Iconic Marquee.
- Interactive map of Esquire Theatre
- Former names: Hiawatha Theater (1927–1942)
- Address: 590 Downing St. Denver, CO 80218; United States
- Coordinates: 39.725401°N 104.972785°W
- Owner: Franklin 10 LLC
- Operator: Landmark Theatres (1980–2024)
- Capacity: Approximately 450 (originally 800)
- Type: Cinema
- Screens: 2 (twinned by the early 1990s; sources differ on whether the conversion occurred in the 1980s or early 1990s)
- Designation: Non-contributing structure, Alamo Placita Historic District
- Parking: 28

Construction
- Groundbreaking: May 24, 1927
- Opened: September 3, 1927 (as Hiawatha)
- Renovated: 1965 (Crowther exterior), 1980s or early 1990s (twinned), 2019 (interior)
- Closed: July 18, 2024
- Years active: As the Hiawatha: 1927–1942; As the Esquire: 1942–2018, 2019–2020, 2021–2024
- Cost: More than $40,000 (1927; equivalent to $741,379 in 2025)
- Architect: Richard L. Crowther (1965 renovation)
- General contractors: Dutton & Kendall (1927 construction)

Website
- landmarktheatres.com/denver/esquire-theatre

The Esquire Theatre, originally the Hiawatha Theater, is a historic movie theater building at 590 Downing Street in Denver, Colorado, at the corner of East Sixth Avenue and Downing Street in the Capitol Hill neighborhood. Built in 1927 by theater operator Gordon B. Ashworth with an American Indian decorative theme inspired by Longfellow's poem The Song of Hiawatha, the building housed a neighborhood cinema through the late 1920s and 1930s before closing around 1939. It reopened in November 1942 as the Esquire, operated by Fox-Intermountain Theaters, with Helen Jean Spiller as manager and an all-female staff.

Under Spiller's management (1942 to approximately 1954), the Esquire functioned as both a neighborhood cinema and a community gathering place, hosting annual toy matinees, children's programming, and prestige bookings including the 1949 Denver roadshow engagement of Laurence Olivier's Hamlet. In November 1954, Fox Intermountain formally repositioned the Esquire as its key Denver venue for international and art-house films, launching a subscription-based film festival circuit across a 25-city, seven-state territory. The Denver Film Society used the Esquire as its primary exhibition venue, and the theater introduced a no-late-seating policy for Diabolique in 1956, four years before Alfred Hitchcock's similar policy for Psycho. The building also served as a recurring venue for Denver's Jewish community, from Yiddish and anti-Nazi film screenings at the Hiawatha in the 1930s through civic events at the Esquire in the 1950s, a connection documented primarily through the Intermountain Jewish News.

Landmark Theatres began operating the Esquire in 1980, continuing its identity as an art-house and repertory cinema. The theater gained attention in 1988 as the site of Denver's exclusive run of Martin Scorsese's The Last Temptation of Christ, which drew protests and record attendance. The Esquire also maintained a long-running midnight movie series, including one of the longest continuous runs of The Rocky Horror Picture Show in the United States. The building's exterior was redesigned in 1965 by Denver architect Richard L. Crowther. After closures for water damage in 2018 and the COVID-19 pandemic in 2020, Landmark ceased operations in July 2024 when its lease expired. The building, owned since 2021 by Franklin 10 LLC, is slated for adaptive reuse as restaurant and retail space, with the theater's marquee signs to be preserved.

== Construction and opening (1927) ==
=== Announcement and groundbreaking ===
In May 1927, Denver theater operator Gordon B. Ashworth announced plans to build the Hiawatha Theater at 590 Downing Street. (Note: Ashworth had owned and directed the Federal Theater at West 37th Avenue and Federal Boulevard for three years and was a member of the local film board of trade.) Ashworth, a former World War I flier and lieutenant, described the project as inspired by Longfellow's poem The Song of Hiawatha: "the architectural materialization of the story of this stalwart Indian." "The story of Hiawatha will be depicted in the decorative system," Ashworth explained, "and the brilliant, rich Indian coloring will be used throughout." He framed the Hiawatha in national terms, declaring that Denver would "find itself in the ranks of the unusual in theaters" alongside new cinema palaces being constructed across the country. Ashworth envisioned the Hiawatha as "a jewel in a western setting," with "every detail so perfectly arranged that there will not be one false note" and construction arranged so that "every seat will be the best seat in the house." The building was planned as "ultra-modern in every health-promoting, scenic and lighting detail," with a seating capacity of 900 and a construction budget of more than $40,000 (equivalent to $741,379 in 2025).

Excavation began on Tuesday, May 24, 1927, with the contracting firm of Dutton & Kendall handling construction. Ashworth targeted an opening in early September, a timeline of approximately three and a half months that the project met. The Hiawatha was sufficiently noteworthy to be picked up by the national film trade press: a July 13, 1927 Film Daily roundup, "Five New Theaters for Denver by Fall," placed the Hiawatha alongside other contemporaneous Denver projects including a 1,000-seat house being built by contractor Michael McEahern at West 44th Avenue and Yates Street and a 1,000-seat Carter Theatre being built by W. J. Carter at West 10th Avenue and Santa Fe Drive.

=== Architecture and interior design ===
Denver artist Corliss McGee designed and painted a series of brilliantly colored murals for the interior, Indian in motif and tone, depicting the story of Hiawatha; the Rocky Mountain News article included an illustration of one of McGee's mural designs. The interior walls were finished in a light bronze tone; the upper portions, rounding into the ceiling, bore designs taken from Indian blankets, each an authentic symbol representing a legend, worked in reds, blues, and what the Rocky Mountain News described as "the brilliant Indian tones." Indian pottery jars arranged along the top of the walls provided indirect lighting, with additional Indian motifs below serving as light fixtures. The lighting system was combined "in a most unusual manner" with the ventilation system. The carpet was Indian in tone and design, and the lobby was described as "very handsomely dressed."

Illustration of a mural design by Denver artist Corliss McGee for the Hiawatha Theatre interior, published in the Rocky Mountain News on July 3, 1927. McGee's murals depicted the story of Hiawatha in what the paper called "the brilliant Indian tones."

The Rocky Mountain News called the Hiawatha "the only really western theater in the community," with an exterior "effective in simplicity and of design." Less than two months after opening, the Denver Clarion, the University of Denver student newspaper, went further, claiming the Hiawatha had "the distinction of being the first theater in America built after the American Indian style." The community "looks upon the edifice with pride," the paper noted, and reported that "something original and new may be expected each time" from the stage presentations. (Note: The KiMo Theater in Albuquerque, designed in Pueblo Deco style, also opened in 1927. Whether the Hiawatha's claim of primacy is literally accurate is uncertain, but it was made contemporaneously.)

The theater's opening capacity was reported as 800 seats, down from the 900 planned during construction. (Note: The planned capacity of 900 seats was reported in both the May 22 and May 25, 1927 Rocky Mountain News articles; the September 2 opening preview reported 800. Whether the design was scaled back during construction or one figure is rounded is not clear from available sources.)

The original Hiawatha Theatre was a brick building with a stepped parapet along Downing Street, a boxy marquee, steel casement windows, and decorative arched windows on the primary façade. The original architect is unknown; the building was constructed by Dutton and Kendal General Contractors.

Phil Goodstein, a Denver historian whose The Ghosts of Denver: Capitol Hill is one of the few published accounts of the building's early history, wrote that the Hiawatha was built "at the behest of John Thompson of the Bluebird." Contemporary Rocky Mountain News accounts from 1927, however, consistently identify Gordon B. Ashworth as the theater's builder and owner. Thompson may have been a financial backer, or the attribution may reflect an error in Goodstein's account, written approximately 95 years after the theater's construction.

=== Opening weekend ===
The Hiawatha Theatre at 590 Downing Street, late 1927. The marquee advertises Lon Chaney in Mockery. Denver Tramway overhead lines and rails are visible on Sixth Avenue. The building's original facade, with Gothic-arched windows and zigzag canopy, was replaced in a 1965 redesign by Richard L. Crowther.

The Hiawatha opened on the evening of Saturday, September 3, 1927. That morning, Ashworth, drawing on his aviation background, flew over Denver with Justin A. McInniny of the Alexander Aircraft Company in an Alexander Eaglerock biplane, dropping numbered circulars over the city. Circulars ending in "0" earned a 30-day theater pass; those beginning with "5" earned a free airplane ride from Alexander Airport.

The opening-night feature was Winners of the Wilderness starring Joan Crawford, accompanied by a color film of Whittier's The Barefoot Boy. On stage, a trio of melody makers performed alongside a child singer performing an Indian song, a live theatrical extension of the building's decorative program, reflecting the performance conventions of the era. The following day's booking was College Days with Marceline Day. The Rocky Mountain News described the opening as "a gala affair attended by all the film men as well as fans in town," with crowds arriving "from all parts of the city." On Saturday afternoon, Ashworth hosted a free children's matinee for the neighborhood.

Local businesses took out a full-page welcome advertisement: Quality Bakery at 1308 East 6th Avenue ("Welcome to Our Neighbor The Hiawatha Theater"), Hannon Drug Company at the corner of 6th and Marion ("One Block From the Hiawatha"), Wobido's Pharmacy at the corner of 4th and Corona, the National Quality Meat Market at 1310 East 6th Avenue, the Colorado Photo Company at 1942 Broadway ("The Hiawatha Selected Us"), and a screen and millwork company that had done finish work on the theater's interior.

=== Early programming and sound technology ===
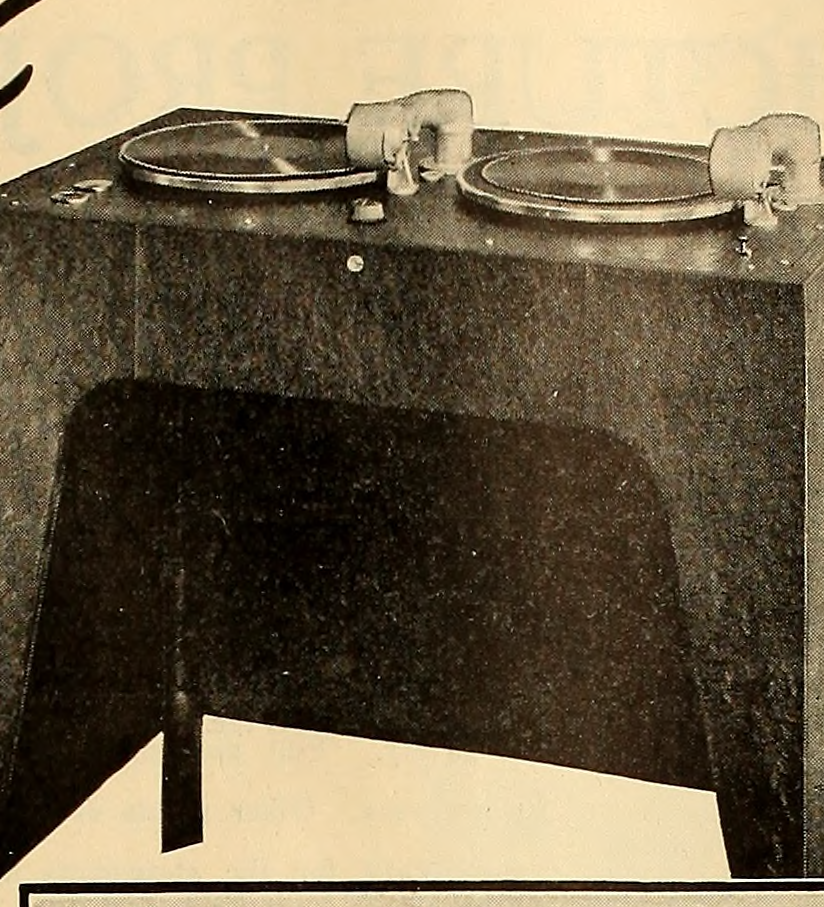
The Orchestraphone, the non-synchronous disc sound system the Hiawatha installed in late December 1927, as advertised in The Motion Picture Projectionist (1928)

Within weeks of opening, the Hiawatha began staging live dance prologues on weekend evenings. Bernard Hoffman, a dancer previously associated with the America Theater, composed and staged the programs, decorating the stage for each performance. In December 1927, Billy B. Beam, a vaudeville comedian from Muskogee, Oklahoma, completed an eight-week residency across the Hiawatha, Cameron, and other Denver neighborhood theaters. A veteran of Big Time vaudeville circuits, Beam had originated the "gift night" format (comedy combined with prize giveaways) in 1909, and toured nationally with his wife, booking himself independently. The combination of film screenings and live vaudeville acts was the standard presentation model for neighborhood theaters in the late silent film era. In late December 1927, just two months after The Jazz Singer launched the sound film revolution, the Hiawatha installed the Orchestraphone, described by the Rocky Mountain News as "the most recent of the talking motion picture machines." Released by the National Theater Supply Company, it was the only Orchestraphone in Denver.

The Orchestraphone was a non-synchronous, disc-based system. Rather than mechanically locking a soundtrack to the projector, it played commercial phonograph records through turntables and loudspeakers to accompany silent pictures, and was marketed to smaller and independent houses as an inexpensive alternative to the costly synchronized systems such as Vitaphone then being installed in downtown movie palaces. The cultural historian Emily Thompson has described such non-synchronous theater turntables as a "curious prehistory" of later disc-jockey and remix practice, while cautioning that there is no known connection between the booth equipment of the late 1920s and the turntablism that emerged decades later. First National held a trade-style preview of The Shepherd of the Hills using the system on December 29, in cooperation with the National Theater Supply Company.

== Ownership changes and Depression-era operations (1927–1939) ==
=== Change of ownership ===
Ashworth sold the Hiawatha within approximately three months of opening. By December 1927, J.J. Hamilton had purchased the theater and installed the Orchestraphone, planning to make the venue "ultra-modern in every particular." In November 1933, the International Amusement Company, headed by Theodore Zadra and H.A. Goodridge, took over operation. The company already controlled the Ogden Theatre on East Colfax Avenue and the Liberty Bell Theater in Leadville. Manager Louis Williams and the entire Hiawatha staff were retained.

By the mid-1930s the Hiawatha had been absorbed into the Fox chain, predating the Fox-operated Esquire reopening of 1942 by more than five years. A June 13, 1936 Film Daily item in the trade paper's "Coming and Going" Denver column noted that Louis Williams — the same manager identified in the 1933 Rocky Mountain News coverage as having been retained by International Amusement Co. at the time of its acquisition — had moved on from the Hiawatha within the Fox organization: "Louis Williams, former manager of the Hiawatha theatre here, is the city manager at Walsenburg, Colo., succeeding [Wayne]…" A May 18, 1937 Fort Collins Coloradoan item reported that Bill Hughes, son of Coach Harry W. Hughes, had been made manager of "the Hiawatha theater, one of the Fox group, in Denver," and was to assume his new duties Thursday. (Note: How the Hiawatha passed from International Amusement to Fox is not established in the available newspaper record. The 1936 Film Daily Williams transfer notice and the 1937 Coloradoan Bill Hughes appointment are two of the few surviving traces of the building's mid-to-late-1930s operation, both placing it within the Fox organization.) Three years later, the Fox connection was reaffirmed when the Daily Sentinel of Grand Junction reported in June 1940 that Ed C. Nelson "is the new manager of the Fox theatre [in Montrose] coming here from the Hiawatha theatre in Denver" and that his predecessor, Vern Fletcher, had been "promoted to the booking offices of Fox International in Denver." The 1940 notice anchors a Fox-Intermountain operational presence in Denver — with a regional booking office and former Hiawatha personnel attached to it — at a moment when the Hiawatha itself had ceased advertising film bookings. The wording "coming here from the Hiawatha theatre" is consistent with Nelson having managed the Hiawatha until its c. 1939 closure rather than implying that the Hiawatha was still operating in mid-1940.

=== Community life ===
During the Depression, the Hiawatha functioned as a neighborhood institution beyond its role as a cinema. In the summer of 1932, the theater fielded a softball team in the Lakeside League at Lakeside Amusement Park. In the Rocky Mountain softball tournament, the Hiawatha defeated Stearns Dairy 8–4 (with a lineup of Nadler, Snyder, Zekerman, Neumen, Richardson, Schwartz, Zarens, Goldman, Cohen, Zekman, and Martin) and beat Fabricant Auto 2–0. The team received a forfeit from Boulder Cleaners, had a late game against Sobule Brothers at 10 PM in the Lakeside League, and advanced to face O.P. Skaggs at 9 PM and then Conoco Oil in the semi-finals.

Denver's Intermountain Jewish News followed the 1932 season through Herman Enger's weekly column "Thru Enger's Eyes," which grouped the Hiawatha club among the city's "Jewish teams," alongside B'nai B'rith, the Sobule Brothers, and the Zekman Furriers, the name under which the same players competed in another league. The column named several of the men, including pitcher Fred Zekman, who threw a no-hit, no-run game in July 1932, and Bennie Newman, whom Enger called one of the best all-around softball players in the city.

In November 1932 the theater was the scene of a daylight robbery that drew national wire-service attention. According to an Associated Press dispatch carried in the Fort Collins Coloradoan and elsewhere, a "well dressed and young" robber pushed his way into the cashier's cage and asked Marian Llewellyn, the 21-year-old cashier, if he might use her telephone. Without waiting for permission, he picked up the receiver, ordered a taxi-cab, then chatted with the cashier until the cab arrived; only then did he produce a revolver, order Llewellyn to load all the theater's receipts, about $150 (equivalent to $3,540 in 2025), into a bag, and ride away in the waiting taxi.

=== Jewish community programming ===
The Hiawatha served as a venue where Denver's Jewish community could see films reflecting their experience. The theater screened Symphony of Six Million (RKO, directed by Gregory La Cava, produced by David O. Selznick, score by Max Steiner) on July 10-12, 1932, at Depression-era prices of 10¢ and 25¢ (equivalent to $2 in 2025 and equivalent to $6 in 2025). The Intermountain Jewish News described the engagement as an opportunity for "Jewish people who were unable to see this true picture of Jewish life at moderate prices."

== Final Hiawatha years and closure (1939) ==
In its final months of confirmed operation, the Hiawatha screened two films of particular significance. In April 1939, the theater showed Professor Mamlock (1938), a Soviet anti-Nazi film written by Friedrich Wolf, a Jewish refugee from Hitler's Germany, depicting the persecution of a German-Jewish surgeon. The Intermountain Jewish News noted the film had been "banned in some eastern states because it is too dangerous."

In late May, the Hiawatha screened Mamele (1938, made in Poland), starring Molly Picon, whom the IJN called "darling of the Yiddish stage." The film arrived in Denver direct from a two-month run at New York's Continental Theater. An "overflow audience sat spellbound," the paper reported in its review; the film ran through the following Monday. Both screenings occurred months before the German invasion of Poland on September 1, 1939; much of the Polish Yiddish film industry that produced Mamele would be destroyed in the Holocaust.

The Hiawatha's last confirmed operation was in late May 1939. The building was dark from approximately mid-1939 until its reopening as the Esquire in November 1942. (Note: No contemporary closure announcement has been located. The cause of the closure is not established in the available newspaper record.) The building's final programming, politically challenging anti-fascist cinema and Yiddish-language film, foreshadowed the art-house identity the venue would formally adopt over a decade later under its new name.

== Reopening as the Esquire (1942) ==
The building reopened on Tuesday, November 10, 1942 as the Esquire Theatre, operated by Fox-Intermountain Theaters, Inc. The former Hiawatha had been "completely remodeled in a thoroly modern manner," with a new screen, new projection and sound equipment, and what the Denver Post called "a striking front." Spiller described it as "the most up-to-date theater in the Rocky Mountain west." The Esquire opened as a first-run house, showing films "day and date" with the downtown Denver Theatre, the Fox chain's Denver flagship. The premiere attraction was Thunder Birds in Technicolor, starring Gene Tierney, Preston Foster, and John Sutton, with Counter-Espionage starring Warren William as The Lone Wolf and Eric Blore. Doors opened nightly at 6:45 PM except on Tuesdays, Saturdays, and Sundays, when doors opened at 3 PM with continuous performances. Wartime admission prices were 40¢ for matinees (before 6 PM), 50¢ for evenings, 30¢ for soldiers, 10¢ for children, and 60¢ on Sundays, all prices including tax. By 1953, the Esquire was one of nine Fox theaters in Denver. Variety tracked the opening in its Picture Grosses column. The November 25, 1942 issue gave the Esquire's reported seating capacity as 752 (somewhat below the 800 figure the Rocky Mountain News had reported at the 1927 Hiawatha opening), with admission prices of 30, 40, 50, and 60 cents. The Esquire's opening-week box-office (week of November 10–17) was $5,000 with Thunder Birds and the Universal short-feature comedy Get Hep to Live; in its second week, the Esquire and the Denver played Gentleman Jim (Warner Bros.) and That Other Woman (20th Century-Fox), with the Esquire taking $4,500 and the Denver $13,000. (Note: Variety's listing of "Thunder Birds" plus "Get Hep to Live" for the opening week differs slightly from the Denver Post's November 3, 1942 advertisement, which paired "Thunder Birds" with the Columbia feature "Counter-Espionage." A mid-week change to the secondary feature is one explanation; another is that one of the two trade reports erred in capturing the Esquire's bill of fare.)

A full-page advertisement in Motion Picture Daily on November 19, 1945 reproduced a Western Union telegram from Fox-Intermountain president Rick Ricketson to PRC Pictures vice-president Harry H. Thomas, congratulating Thomas on the Denver first-run engagement of the Cinecolor feature The Enchanted Forest: "Our Denver Esquire and Weber theatres have just concluded first run engagement of 'The Enchanted Forest' and we have moved the picture to our Aladdin theatre. The first week engagement in the three first run houses was very satisfactory and the audience reaction was splendid." The advertisement, headlined "AT THREE FOX THEATERS — DENVER ESQUIRE WEBBER" and signed "Thanks 'RICK' RICKETSON for a TOP AD and Exploitation CAMPAIGN for a TOP PICTURE!", confirms that the Esquire functioned as one of three Fox-Intermountain first-run houses in Denver during the Helen Spiller–era 1940s, running mainstream Hollywood product alongside the prestige bookings the Esquire is better known for.

=== Helen Jean Spiller ===
Helen Spiller, photographed in November 1942 when the Denver Post announced her as "Denver's first woman theater manager." Spiller managed the Esquire from its 1942 opening until approximately 1954 and instituted the theater's all-female staff.

Helen Jean Spiller, described by the Denver Post as "Denver's first woman theater manager," was named manager of the Esquire at its 1942 opening. At the time, Spiller lived at 4 Logan Street and had spent seven years in the motion picture business, the last three as cashier at the downtown Denver Theatre, the Fox chain's Denver flagship. "And to carry the feminine touch a step farther," the Post reported, "the Esquire will be operated by an all-girl staff." She remained central to the theater's identity until her death in 1957. Her Rocky Mountain News obituary described her as "prominent in Denver theater circles." She had come to Colorado as a young woman and spent most of her life in Denver, with a career spent entirely within the Fox theater organization, where she had worked her way up from cashier to personnel manager, bookkeeper, and finally theater manager. The obituary confirmed that she "instituted a famous all-girl staff for the theater," the same all-female team announced in the 1942 opening coverage, notable enough to be memorialized in print fifteen years later. A 1956 "Staff Week" event during which "the Esquire aides" ran the theater and staged a midnight screening of Diabolique appears to reference this staff demonstrating their capabilities.

In October 1953, Spiller received the Clayton Long Trophy, the highest award in the Fox-Intermountain Theaters chain, presented by Rick Ricketson, president of the organization, and Ray Davis, the Fox Denver city manager. She represented the Esquire in partnerships beyond the theater itself, including a corporate safety incentive program with the Gates Rubber Company that pooled $6,480 (equivalent to $77,978 in 2025) in ticket books from nine Denver Fox theaters for Gates' 4,500 employees. Other Fox managers participating included Harvey Gollogher of the Bluebird Theater and Earl Goldsworth. The national film trade press also routinely listed Spiller as Esquire manager: a 1947 Boxoffice Denver-section roster of Fox-Intermountain managers grouped her with Ralph Lee at the Bluebird, Ned Greenslit at the Aladdin, and Harry Goodridge at the Ogden.

The obituary appears to indicate that Spiller managed the Esquire from 1942 until approximately 1954, when she received a promotion within the Fox organization; the exact year and the new title are unclear due to damage in the surviving text. Spiller lived at 1045 East 12th Avenue, within walking distance of the theater. She died October 22, 1957; services were held at 1 PM at Howard Mortuary with cremation at Tower of Memories. She was survived by her mother, Mrs. Maude Spiller; and two sisters, Mildred Spiller and Mrs. Charles Jeffers, all of Denver. The family requested memorial gifts to the Colorado Heart Fund in lieu of flowers.

Like the Hiawatha before it, the Esquire was occasionally the scene of armed robbery during Spiller's tenure. On the night of September 4, 1946, an Associated Press dispatch reported, a "freckle-faced, youthful gunman" forced a "formally-dressed woman" to serve as a shield in a $58 (equivalent to $958 in 2025) holdup at the Esquire. According to Detective Sergeant Charles Burns, the gunman had entered Mrs. Charles Foy's car as she sat in front of a friend's house, drawn a revolver, and ordered her to drive him to "the Esquire, a neighborhood theatre."

=== Community programming ===
Helen Spiller, manager of the Esquire, watches as Jimmy Grimshaw donates a toy during the theater’s 1949 holiday matinee. The drive supported the Denver Santa Claus Shop. Bill Burton, engineer of the American Legion’s toy train, helped collect gifts, and a Lions Club miniature locomotive was stationed outside the theater.

Under Spiller's management, the Esquire ran annual holiday toy matinees as a sustained community practice. In 1949, the Esquire and the Bluebird Theater held a joint toy matinee, partnering with the Denver Santa Claus Shop, the Lions Club, and the American Legion. The Lions Club stationed a miniature locomotive in front of the Esquire to collect donations, with Bill Burton serving as engineer of the American Legion's toy train. Films were donated by Warner Bros. and Columbia Pictures. Donations were delivered to Trinity Church at East 18th Avenue and Broadway for distribution to families through welfare agency certificates. Jimmy Grimshaw, age 2 1/2, of 1121 East 6th Avenue (the Esquire's own block) was photographed arriving early with his toy. Spiller told the Rocky Mountain News: "Wheel toys and sporting goods are particularly in demand. We hope toys will be in fairly good condition, because repair facilities are limited." In 1951, Lorraine Keys of 420 Monroe Street was photographed arriving early. The program included an Abbott and Costello comedy and color cartoons. In 1953, the theater partnered with Goodwill Industries, screening a Roy Rogers film donated by Republic Pictures, a Hopalong Cassidy picture from United Artists, and an Our Gang comedy. Jackie Carl Bartholomew, age 4, of 628 Corona Street was photographed presenting his toy to Spiller.

Spiller also ran Saturday kid matinees with a secret-code contest whose clues were hidden in Fox Theaters' newspaper advertisements, and weekly Wednesday summer matinees (three-hour programs starting at 1 PM with games, features, comedies, and color cartoons) with membership loyalty cards offering every fourth show free. In one characteristic promotion, Spiller spotted a photograph of three-year-old Heidi Vincent of 175 South Knox Court in the Sunday Rocky Mountain News and invited her, and every other girl in Denver named Heidi, to see the film Heidi at the Esquire for free. Girls named Heidi were told to call Miss Spiller at the theater. The theater also hosted a children's spring and summer fashion show, offered alongside the regular movie program, given by Cramer's of Aurora, with garments modeled by youngsters, and an eighth-birthday block party in November 1950, with cake for every patron, a sneak preview of an outdoor action film, and free admission for all children turning eight that month for the Saturday morning Hopalong Cassidy show.

=== Prestige bookings and the Fox chain ===
Even before its formal repositioning as an art-house venue, the Esquire handled prestige bookings normally associated with downtown flagship theaters. Laurence Olivier's Hamlet, the 1948 Best Picture winner and the first non-American film to receive the award, was described as "now being shown in the larger American cities" when the Esquire announced its engagement. The film played a multi-week roadshow engagement at the Fox Esquire beginning February 15, 1949. All seats were reserved, with twice-daily showings at 2:30 and 8:30 PM. Tickets went on sale February 8 at the theater and were also available at the downtown Paramount Theater. Evening prices ranged from $1.20 to $2.40 (equivalent to $16.24 in 2025 equivalent to $32.48 in 2025); matinees from $1.20 to $1.80, more than double the standard movie ticket of the era.

In late 1952, the Esquire ran a joint promotion with the downtown Denver Theater and the Rocky Mountain News for the Doris Day film April in Paris (Warner Bros.), including a national contest with a trip to Paris as the grand prize. Local finalists received passes good at any Fox Denver theater.

The Esquire's status within the Fox-Intermountain circuit also extended to industry-only events. National film trade publications listed the Esquire repeatedly during the late 1940s and early 1950s as Denver's designated venue for distributor trade screenings — afternoon advance shows for exhibitors, bookers, and the press scheduled by major studios. Motion Picture Herald trade-screening calendars place industry shows at the Esquire on November 20, 1946, March 1, 1948, and October 26, 1953 (the latter an MGM trade show for Kiss Me Kate).

In May 1951, Anthony Dexter (born Walter Craig) made personal appearances at both the downtown Denver Theater and the Esquire to open the Columbia Pictures biopic Valentino. Dexter was joined on the whirlwind tour by his costar, the British actress Patricia Medina; the pair received Colorado State College of Education alumni for an hour at the Brown Palace Hotel, where Dexter had performed in The Little Theatre of the Rockies in the summer of 1947. The Greeley Daily Tribune reported that the appearances at the Denver and Esquire theaters "highlighted the release of the picture in Colorado."

By April 1954, the Esquire was drawing block-long lines for Heidi, winner of the Venice International Film Festival's best youth film award, with four daily performances and audiences in which adults outnumbered children. A Rocky Mountain News feature by Frances Melrose profiled Spiller as "mopping her brow" from the volume of business. One woman telephoned Spiller from a barbershop nearly a block away to ask whether she would make the next show. The same feature situated the Esquire within Denver's mid-1950s exhibition landscape: Pinocchio was playing at the RKO Orpheum, Prince Valiant was opening in CinemaScope at the Denver Theater, and Justice Is Done (another Venice prize winner) was at the Vogue Art Cinema.

== Art-house pivot and the Denver Film Society (1954–1970s) ==
The Esquire's association with art-house and repertory programming predated Landmark Theatres' involvement by decades. Goodstein wrote that in the 1950s, "the Esquire emphasized it was a serious theater rather than a simple cinema," stressing "high-class films, e.g. Shakespearean dramas such as Lawrence Olivier in Henry V." The cinema served tea before the movies began, handing patrons printed programs for the films.

=== Fox-Intermountain's repositioning ===
In November 1954, Fox Intermountain Theaters (a division of National Theatres) formally designated the Esquire as its key Denver venue for "unusual films from all over the world." The repositioning launched with the Western premiere of The Little Kidnappers (1953). The Esquire became the flagship for a 25-city, seven-state film festival circuit across Fox Intermountain's territory, with films offered on a subscription basis over twelve-week periods in cooperation with local civic groups. Fox described the arrangement as a first: no other exhibition chain was known to be offering subscription art-film programming with community partnerships. Festival programs also launched in Rawlins and Laramie, Wyoming, and La Junta, Colorado.

=== Denver Film Society programming ===
The Denver Film Society used the Esquire as its primary Denver exhibition venue. In the first months of 1956, DFS presented Cocktails in the Kitchen, a British comedy "in the tradition of Genevieve and Doctor in the House" that had completed a successful two-month run at Boston's Exeter Street Theater; any couple married during the engagement was admitted free. Showings ran at 5:30, 7:30, and 9:30 PM, with Saturday matinees at 3:30 and Sunday matinees at 1:30 and 3:30. DFS also staged a revival of The Life of Emile Zola (1937 Best Picture) with the Robert Benchley short How to Sleep, on the same daily schedule.

The Western premiere of Diabolique (Henri-Georges Clouzot) in late January 1956 proved a landmark booking. The Rocky Mountain News called it "one of the most important films to come out of France in the last 10 years." The film had won the French critics' prize and the New York Film Critics' award for Best Foreign Language Film of 1955, and its New York engagement had been playing to capacity since October. For this screening, the Esquire introduced a no-late-seating policy: "Because of the unusual nature of this motion picture, the Esquire Theater will not admit any patron after the main feature has begun." The Rocky Mountain News described the practice as "unprecedented." DFS also announced plans to bring Clouzot's The Wages of Fear to Denver. The no-late-seating policy continued as a standing house rule; by May 1956 the paper noted that "nearly all Esquire patrons have heartily endorsed this new system, which gives them freedom from distraction during the showing of the feature films." The practice predated Alfred Hitchcock's famous no-late-admission policy for Psycho (1960) by four years. National trade press tracked the engagement: a February 1956 Variety picture-grosses report observed that Diabolique "looks sock at Esquire" — the publication's idiom for strong box-office performance.

The Diabolique midnight screening at 11:45 PM during Staff Week, with the Esquire's staff running the theater to demonstrate their capabilities, also established a midnight movie tradition at the venue that would persist for decades.

=== 1960s and 1970s programming ===
The Esquire Theatre at 590 Downing Street, October 1968, showing the Richard L. Crowther redesigned exterior (1965). The marquee advertises The Graduate during its 52-week run at the theater. Photograph by Benjamin Draper.

The theatre also screened mainstream prestige releases during this period. West Side Story played at the Esquire in 1961, and Mary Deshaies worked the ticket booth in 1964 during a run of Zorba the Greek. By 1967, the Esquire was equipped with Panavision and DeLuxe Color projection capability. The Graduate opened at the Esquire on December 22, 1967, and ran for 52 consecutive weeks, one of the longest exclusive engagements in the film's national rollout, matched only by the Four Star in Los Angeles, the Coronet in New York, and the Town in Seattle.

In August 1972, four trustees of the Denver-based Golden Indian Bread Foundation — including Vernon Bellecourt, national director of the American Indian Movement — sued in Denver District Court to halt the Esquire premiere of When the Legends Die, a 20th Century Fox adaptation of Hal Borland's novel about a young Ute man, on the grounds that the screening had been advertised as a benefit for the foundation. Bellecourt called the film "another exploitation by 20th Century-Fox," and the trustees argued that holding the benefit at the Esquire would create the public impression that the foundation endorsed the film. Judge James Flanigan denied the request for a temporary restraining order on August 25, 1972, finding no clear showing of "immediate and irreparable injury and harm," and the premiere proceeded as scheduled.

The Esquire was also used for non-film events during this period. The Colonial Dames of Colorado sponsored an annual "Know Your Antiques" lecture series at the theater on three consecutive Wednesday mornings each fall in 1972 and 1973, drawing curators from the Boston Museum of Fine Arts, the Winterthur estate in Delaware, and Old Sturbridge Village in Massachusetts. Proceeds supported Colonial Dames–maintained museums in Colorado, including the McAllister House in Colorado Springs and the Colonial Rooms at the Denver Art Museum.

=== The Esquire as a venue for diverse communities ===
The Esquire served as a gathering point and exhibition venue for multiple Denver communities. In spring 1956, the Mile-Hi chapter of the Japanese American Citizens League (JACL) co-sponsored the first Denver showing of Samurai, an International Film Festival winner, with the screening announced for April 26 and expected to run for three weeks. Tickets were available at $1.00 at both the JACL office at 1225 20th Street and the Esquire.

In September 1956, the Ladies Auxiliary of the Jewish National Home for Asthmatic Children (JNHAC) held a membership theater party at the Esquire, with a dessert luncheon served in the lobby before a sneak preview. Lieutenant Governor Stephen McNichols delivered greetings at the event, organized by Mrs. Ben Kaminsky (tea chairman), Mrs. Manuel Hoffman (program chairman), Mrs. Albert Rose (membership chairman), and auxiliary president Mrs. Maurice (Nan) Gaon. The Jewish community's connection to the building extended back to the Hiawatha era, from Symphony of Six Million in 1932 and the Yiddish and anti-Nazi programming of 1939, through the JNHAC events of 1956, a relationship spanning twenty-four years across both names, documented primarily through the Intermountain Jewish News.

In 1987, under Landmark Theatres' operation, the Esquire extended its engagement of the Merchant Ivory film Maurice, covered by Out Front, Colorado's LGBT newspaper, as a significant screening for its readership.

=== Name change ===
Sources disagree on when the theatre was renamed. Four independent sources place the name change in 1942: a 2020 article in the CU Denver Historical Studies Journal, which noted that the 1942 reopening featured "Denver's first female theater manager and an all-female staff"; research compiled by preservation activist Jolee Harston as reported in Westword; a 2005 Denver Post retrospective, which noted that the Esquire "reopened as the Esquire in 1942 with 'Thunderbirds'"; and Phil Goodstein's history of Capitol Hill, which corroborated that "the remodeled hall became the Esquire in 1942" and that the cinema "advertised that it employed Denver's first women theater manager and an 'all-girl staff.'" Goodstein noted that the Hiawatha "did not fare well through the 1930s" and that by 1941, an Evangelical temple had rented the building for Sunday morning services, placing the closure in religious rather than purely commercial terms and filling the gap between the Hiawatha's last confirmed film screenings in 1939 and the 1942 reopening.

Other sources tie the name change to the building's 1960s renovation rather than the 1942 reopening. The Denver Landmark Preservation Commission's 2024 staff report states that "in 1965, notable Denver architect Richard Crowther made extensive alterations to the building and it reopened as the Esquire Theater." Goodstein dated a separate remodeling to 1966, describing it as "further remodeling and a role change." A BusinessDen article placed the name change more vaguely in "the 1960s."

The weight of available evidence favors 1942 for the name change itself, with the 1965–1966 date referring to the Crowther renovation that gave the building its current exterior appearance; the DLPC report appears to conflate the two events. A contemporary Denver Post advertisement from November 3, 1942 — announcing the opening of "a new and distinctive show place, the Esquire Theatre, Sixth and Downing Streets" — confirms the 1942 date for the name change.

=== Crowther renovation ===
In 1965, architect Richard Crowther undertook a major renovation that gave the building its current exterior appearance, replacing the Hiawatha's ornamental features with an austere modernist exterior. Crowther, born in Newark, New Jersey, had worked as a neon light designer in San Diego before moving to Denver in 1948. His firm, Richard L. Crowther & Associates, was based at 257 Fillmore Street in Cherry Creek and expanded in February 1961 to include associates Jack Kruse and Gary Landin. Crowther was known for what the city described as "progressive architecture and the use of passive solar energy." His other Denver projects included the Cooper Cinerama Theater, a cylindrical structure with a 146-degree louvered screen and 814 seats, the first theater designed for Cinerama, which opened on March 9, 1961, at a cost of $1 million and was demolished in 1994. He also designed Cooper theaters in St. Louis Park, Minnesota, and Omaha, Nebraska, as well as ride entrances at Lakeside Amusement Park, White Spot restaurants, and King Soopers stores. The 1965 Esquire commission was his third major Denver theater project of the 1960s: Motion Picture Exhibitor had documented his $250,000 (equivalent to $2,693,486 in 2025) face-lifting renovation of downtown Denver's Denham Theatre in 1961, which reopened on a reserved-seat basis with the Western premiere of Ben-Hur. A Fellow of the American Institute of Architects, Crowther also authored The Paradox of Smoking (1983) and donated his professional materials to the Denver Public Library's Western History Department. He died in 2006 at age 96.

The Ortiz article described the Esquire's post-renovation design as an "austere square box" and an "unornamented Plain Jane," a stark departure from the domes, arches, terra cotta, and elaborate themes of Denver's earlier movie palaces. The city staff report noted that "the Esquire Theater exhibits many of Crowther's design principals including the use of materials and signage design."

=== Building specifications ===
The building measures 9,175 square feet (852.4 m^{2}) with 25-foot (7.6 m) ceilings. Originally a single-screen theatre with a balcony and an opening capacity of 800 seats, the Esquire was converted to a two-screen configuration sometime between the 1980s and the early 1990s; sources disagree on the precise date. Goodstein placed the twinning in "the early 1990s," writing that "another remodeling occurred in the early 1990s saw it turned into a two-screen movie house." A February 2000 Colorado Springs Gazette Telegraph Denver Movie Theater Guide attributed the change to "the '80s," writing that the building "had a balcony, and in the '80s it was remodeled to be a two-screener." The Denver Post described the result as a "twin-screener" with a capacity of approximately 450 seats. The building sits on a corner lot with two street addresses: 590 Downing Street (used throughout the theatre's operating history) and 1212 East 6th Avenue (the Sixth Avenue frontage, used in the property's 2026 commercial lease listing). The lot includes 24 on-site parking spaces; the total gross leasable area following the 2024–2026 renovation is listed as 15,274 square feet (1,419.0 m^{2}), divisible to a minimum of 3,000 square feet (280 m^{2}). The listing agent is Sam Leger of Unique Properties, co-owner of Franklin 10 LLC.

The theatre was equipped with Panavision and DeLuxe Color capability by 1967 and screened films in 70mm format on multiple occasions through its history.

The Esquire is located within the Alamo Placita Historic District, but because Crowther's 1965 alterations fall outside the district's period of significance (1889–1942), the property is classified as non-contributing.

=== Racial segregation ===
Nancelia Jackson, who arrived in the Cherry Creek neighborhood in 1926, recalled "having fun at the Esquire Theatre," but her son Gary reminded her that she had been required to sit in the segregated balcony upstairs. Jackson lived on Garfield Street in Cherry Creek for nearly her entire life; her grandfather William Pitts had built homes in the neighborhood and co-founded the Black resort town of Lincoln Hills near Nederland. Jackson died on August 18, 2024, at age 98, two months shy of her 100th birthday. Her obituary reiterated that she had been "only allowed to watch movies from the Esquire Theatre's balcony." Gary Jackson went on to become the first Black prosecutor in Colorado; Nancelia's diary, begun at age 14, was accessioned at the Museum of Boulder and was being digitized for the Smithsonian's National Museum of African American History and Culture at the time of her death.

== Landmark Theatres era (1980–2024) ==
Landmark Theatres began operating the Esquire in 1980 as a lessee rather than the building's owner. A 1983 legal brief filed with the Colorado Supreme Court in Friends of Chamber Music v. Denver cited the Esquire as an example of a privately owned theatre, distinguishing it from city-owned entertainment venues for purposes of Denver's Facilities Development Admissions Tax. By 1986, the Esquire was co-managed with the Mayan Theatre.

Landmark was an LA-based company; during the Mark Cuban ownership period, it was a subsidiary of 2929 Entertainment and operated 52 locations across 27 markets nationally. Cuban sold Landmark to the Cohen Media Group in 2018. Under Landmark's management, the Esquire operated as part of a three-venue art-house circuit alongside the Mayan and the Chez Artiste. Together the three theaters gave Landmark eight screens in Denver, and the city became one of the chain's top markets nationally. Landmark's vice president of marketing, Ray Price, acknowledged the difficulty of the art-house business but noted that hard work and luck could make it succeed. The circuit's reach extended beyond Denver itself; a 2000 Colorado Springs Gazette article noted that the Mayan, Chez Artiste, and Esquire offered foreign, independent, and off-mainstream fare (films such as Topsy-Turvy, Sweet and Lowdown, and an adaptation of Mansfield Park) that might never reach Colorado Springs. A 1997 Regis University Highlander article described the Landmark chain, "which includes the Mayan, the Chez Artiste, and the Esquire," as providing "quality movies compared to most of what Hollywood shoves down our throats."

In 1996, Rebecca Cole managed the Esquire, which she described as showing "mainly independent films that usually don't attract big, mainstream audiences."

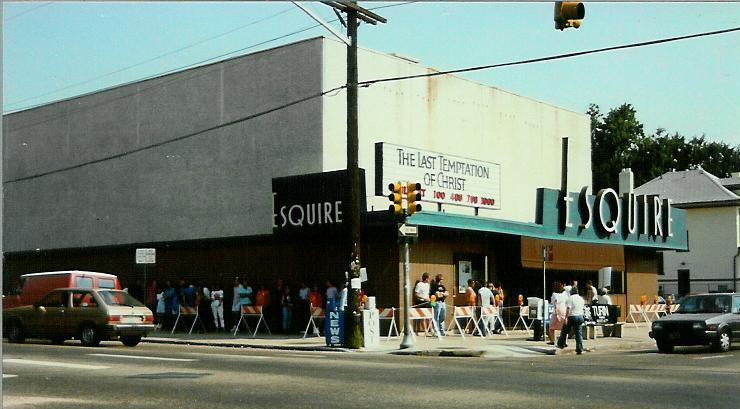
Showing Martin Scorsese's The Last Temptation of Christ in August 1988. A single protestor is visible near the front carrying a sign.

In 1988, the Esquire was the site of Denver's exclusive run of Martin Scorsese's The Last Temptation of Christ, which drew protests and record attendance. A 2005 Denver Post retrospective noted: "Nothing pushes ticket sales quite like a dust-up; the Esquire reported record attendance."

Contemporaneous wire coverage on the eve of the August 26, 1988 Denver opening reported that opponents of the film "began gearing up Thursday to protest the film's opening in Denver today, while city police and businesses braced for expected traffic and parking jams." Police projected that about 300 people would turn out for peaceful demonstrations at the Esquire; theater owners told the Associated Press that the protests were likely to "increase attendance to the film." A separate group of 25 Denver-area ministers announced a counter-event under the banner "Jesus is Alive." A fuller version of the same AP dispatch, carried that day on page 52 of the Colorado Springs Gazette Telegraph, identified David Swanson, manager of Landmark's Denver operations, who said the chain had edited the Esquire's answering-machine message and changed its unlisted office number in an effort to discourage angry calls. The same article identified the Reverend Maurice Gordon of Lovingway United Pentecostal Church as the lead protest organizer, who had held a press conference the day before detailing plans for picketing at the theater. Gordon "hasn't seen the film," the AP reported, "but said he read Nikos Kazantzakis' novel on which it is based. The book was 'clearly inspired by Satan,' he said." Colorado Springs ministers had separately petitioned that city's council to bar a local opening, but the council declined on First Amendment grounds and the film was not scheduled to open there. The next day, the Gazette Telegraph published reporter Tom Morton's on-the-scene account of opening night under the headline "Singing pickets greet debut of 'Last Temptation' in Denver: Moviegoers line up behind barricade," with a photograph by Mark Reis of the Esquire's marquee. Subsequent reporting put the actual turnout well below the 300 protesters police had projected: a December 1988 Gazette Telegraph retrospective by Morton, written ahead of a Colorado Springs screening, recorded that the August 26 Denver opening had drawn "nearly 300 moviegoers" while only "about 40 people sang hymns and carried signs in protest outside the Esquire Theater."

In May 1990, when Landmark closed the Ogden Theatre, Denver Post film critic Howie Movshovitz reported that "some films will move to the upstairs screen at the Esquire or the Mayan." With the three screens at United Artists' Chez Artiste also available, Denver would continue to receive a good selection of non-mainstream films.

In 1987, the Esquire extended its engagement of the Merchant Ivory film Maurice, covered by Out Front, Colorado's LGBT newspaper, as a significant screening for its readership.

=== Concessions and atmosphere ===
By the early 2000s the Esquire offered concessions well beyond standard movie-theater fare, reflecting its art-house identity. Moviegoers could purchase imported Lindt chocolate bars for $2.75 (enjoyed, on at least one occasion, while watching the 7:30 p.m. showing of Chocolat) while the theater's barista prepared cappuccinos and half-caf lattes. Haydn Sillech, president of Colorado Cinema Holdings, which had recently taken over six Mann Theaters in the Denver metro area, noted that Dippin' Dots and hot pretzels had proven especially popular with younger audiences. The theater's popcorn developed its own reputation; a 2012 Denver Post listing described it as "the best popcorn in town," and patrons recalled "popcorn machines from 1927."

Manager Rebecca Cole, who oversaw the Esquire's program of mainly independent films at 590 Downing Street, observed that in nice weather "people want to go to the mountains," but extremely hot summer days reliably drew customers grateful for air conditioning. A February 2000 Colorado Springs Gazette Telegraph Denver Movie Theater Guide characterized the Esquire as "a quaint, unassuming two-screen neighborhood theater" in "Denver's trendy Capitol Hill area," and noted Saturday-night midnight Rocky Horror Picture Show screenings, free parking in the adjacent lot, and ample street parking in the evenings. A 2009 visitors' guide prepared for the American Library Association described the Esquire as a two-screen theater in Denver's residential Capitol Hill neighborhood presenting independent films, with general admission at $9.75 and matinee tickets at $7.25. The guide noted that the theater was accessible from the Colorado Convention Center via the Route 2 bus, with a trip of approximately twenty minutes.

=== Festivals and benefit events ===
The Esquire served as a regular venue for the Denver International Film Festival across multiple years, typically hosting the festival's closing-night screening. Documented festival use of the Esquire goes back at least to May 1979, when a two-week Denver International Film Festival sponsored by First National Bank of Denver used the Esquire, the Ogden, and the Flick as its three theater venues, programming "over 140 film programs and special events." Documentary filmmaker Frederick Wiseman made a personal appearance at the Esquire on the evening of May 11, 1979 to introduce his documentary Meat, filmed at the Monfort feedlot and packing company in Greeley; other festival guests that year included Lillian Gish (at the Ogden, with a screening of D. W. Griffith's Broken Blossoms), John Schlesinger, Christopher Reeve, and Academy Award–winning matte painter Albert Whitlock. A decade later, festival representative Gloria Campbell told a Gazette Telegraph reporter that Woody Allen had personally chosen Denver for the world premiere of Crimes and Misdemeanors to open the 12th festival on October 19, 1989, citing the strength of his Denver following: "Hannah and Her Sisters had a better run at the Esquire in Denver than anywhere else in the country." The Westword–Denver International Film Festival of October 1988 — running concurrent with the Esquire's exclusive Denver engagement of The Last Temptation of Christ — programmed a 7:30 p.m. screening of Clint Eastwood's Charlie Parker biopic Bird at the Esquire on Thursday, October 20, 1988. The 13th festival in 1990 opened at the Paramount Theatre with the American premiere of Waiting for the Light, starring Shirley MacLaine, Teri Garr, and Vincent Schiavelli, and closed at the Esquire with Charles Burnett's To Sleep with Anger on October 18 — billed as the festival's "Last Reel Party" — in which Danny Glover played a villainous house guest.

The Denver International Film Society's financial difficulties in 1991 highlighted the Esquire's role in the festival's history. When the society voted to seek Chapter 11 reorganization, a retrospective account noted that early festival audiences had dashed between the Ogden, the Vogue, and the Esquire, with the Aladdin and the Denver Center Cinema added later, all of which had since closed except the Esquire.

The 14th festival in 1991 opened at the Paramount with Little Man Tate, Jodie Foster's directing debut, ran approximately 80 programs through October 17 at the Cherry Creek Cinema, and concluded with John Sayles' City of Hope at the Esquire. The 15th festival in 1992, which opened with a gala screening of Strictly Ballroom, used the Tivoli, Esquire, and Paramount theaters as its primary venues, with additional events at the Boulder Public Library. The official closing screening was held at the Esquire, while 25th-anniversary presentations of Bonnie and Clyde, The Graduate, and In Cold Blood took place at the Paramount.

The Denver International Film Society organized a recurring benefit event called "Denver Cannes, Too!" that paired Esquire screenings with social gatherings at the nearby La Coupole Cafe. In 1993 the event featured the Italian film Especially on Sunday at the Esquire, followed by a summer buffet on La Coupole's patio; in a distinctly European touch, Cinema Paradiso was screened outdoors on a billboard above the restaurant's patio. The 1994 edition featured a screening of Lina Wertmüller's Me, Let's Hope I Make It at 7:15 p.m., followed by a party at La Coupole with Mumm champagne and hors d'oeuvres. Tickets were $20. In 1996 the event screened Bernardo Bertolucci's Stealing Beauty at 7 p.m., after which guests moved to a patio party at La Coupole featuring Perrier-Jouët champagne, a buffet supper, and dancing. Tickets were $20, or $15 for Denver Film Society members.

The Esquire also served as a venue for benefit premieres and private promotional events throughout the 1990s and 2000s. In May 1992 Landmark Theatre Corp. and Sony Classics co-presented a benefit premiere of Howards End, starring Vanessa Redgrave, Anthony Hopkins, Emma Thompson, and Helena Bonham Carter, at 7 p.m. on May 19 at the Esquire Theatre, with all proceeds going to the Colorado AIDS Project. Tickets were $10 for the film alone or $25 for preferred seating and a dessert reception afterward at Chives American Bistro, with the higher tier also including a champagne reception.

In July 1994 a premiere screening of That's Entertainment! III was held at the Esquire, followed by a reception at the Denver Buffalo Company. Admission was $25 for the film and party or $10 for the film only. In September 1998 Fox Searchlight invited 125 local bartenders to a private screening of The Impostors at the Esquire, with a pre-party at Chives hosted by Grand Marnier.

In June 2004 Boulder-based Free Speech TV hosted a special benefit screening of Michael Moore's Fahrenheit 9/11 at the Esquire, with University of Colorado graduate Urban Hamid, an Iraqi-Swedish journalist whose footage appeared in the film, introducing the showing and leading a post-screening discussion. Tickets were $40, with proceeds supporting Free Speech TV and New York's Deep Dish TV.

=== Big Night and Barolo Grill (1996) ===
The 1996 release of Big Night, starring Tony Shalhoub as an Italian cook, produced an unusually close tie-in between the Esquire and the Denver restaurant scene. Shalhoub's brother Michael worked as a waiter at LoDo's La Coupole restaurant while the film played at the Esquire.

Landmark Theatres, KVOD radio, Cooks Mart, and Barolo Grill jointly sponsored a "Big Night at Barolo Grill" sweepstakes in conjunction with the film's run. Moviegoers who saw Big Night during its first three weeks could register at the Esquire, at Barolo Grill on East Sixth Avenue, or at Cooks Mart on East Third Avenue to win a nine-course, $250 (equivalent to $513 in 2025) dinner for two at Barolo Grill The "Big Night at Barolo Grill" dinner was held on October 30, with the restaurant also preparing a limited-reservation version of the meal on November 9.

Twenty-two sweepstakes winners were served a nine-course meal prepared by chef David Steinmann, with courses including soup, pasta, salmon, risotto, mushrooms, and a full roasted pig the guests dubbed "Babe at Barolo." The dinner was accompanied by dozens of bottles of Italian wine and copious amounts of grappa.

=== Starz FilmCenter competition and programming response (2002) ===
With competition looming from the Starz FilmCenter (later renamed the Sie FilmCenter), which was set to open on April 5, 2002 as the permanent home of the Denver Film Society, Landmark responded by expanding its programming at the Esquire. The chain launched a free Film Club with special member perks, a Meet the Filmmakers program, and a "Direct This!" series in which critics selected screenings of work by their favorite directors. The "Direct This!" screenings took place at 10 a.m. on Saturdays and Sundays at the Esquire beginning April 6, with free admission for the first 100 Film Club members and tickets at $4.50 for additional members or $5.50 for non-members.

=== 75th anniversary celebration (2005) ===
In May 2005 the Mayan and Esquire theaters celebrated the Mayan's 75th anniversary with a series of special events and screenings. David Kimball, Landmark's city manager for Denver who programmed the Mayan, Esquire, and Chez Artiste, said the weekend was a way for the chain to thank the community that had embraced the theaters for many years. The Esquire's Sunday program featured screenings of Casablanca at 10 a.m., Singin' in the Rain at 12:15 p.m., and Buster Keaton's The General at 3 p.m., with the last accompanied by live music from the Mont Alto Motion Picture Orchestra. Tickets, popcorn, and soda were each priced at 75 cents, except for The General, where tickets were $5.

During the anniversary events, Landmark recounted the Esquire's history: the theater had originally opened as the Hiawatha in 1927 at East Sixth Avenue and Downing Street and reopened as the Esquire in 1942 with Thunderbirds.

=== 2010s ===
The Esquire's midnight movie series continued into the 2010s, with the theater turning 85 in 2012. By 2012, the Esquire had two screens and was programming independent and foreign-language films. The theatre celebrated its 85th anniversary on August 29, 2012, with a screening of The Last Picture Show at $5 tickets and a $3 popcorn-and-soda combo. In 2016, the Esquire screened the controversial documentary Vaxxed: From Cover-Up to Catastrophe after a Littleton father wrote to Landmark requesting the film be shown. On August 27, 2023, the theatre participated in National Cinema Day with $4 tickets.

=== DFS antitrust lawsuit (2017) ===
In September 2017, the Denver Film Society and three other independent exhibitors (Cinema Detroit, West End Cinema, and the Avalon Theatre) filed an antitrust lawsuit against Landmark in the US District Court for the District of Columbia. The suit alleged that Landmark used its market dominance to coerce distributors into granting exclusive screening rights, a practice known as "clearance," shutting out independent competitors. DFS executive director Andrew Rodgers stated that since the Sie FilmCenter opened in 2010, the society had never been able to show a film simultaneously screening at a local Landmark location. The Esquire was named alongside the Mayan and the Chez Artiste as one of Landmark's locally recognized Denver theatres.

=== Water damage closure and financial crisis (2018–2021) ===
In mid-December 2018, a utilities outage caused a broken water pipe, forcing the Esquire to close indefinitely. Landmark spokesperson Hugh Wronski described it as "a utility problem including a bit of water damage" but was tight-lipped about the extent of the damage, declining to elaborate. A former employee later described the cause as a burst water pipe; the Denver Post described it as a "damaging water-main break." At the time of the closure, the theatre was showing only one film, Mary Queen of Scots, which was moved to the Mayan Theatre.

The closure extended well beyond initial expectations. By March 2019, the theatre remained shuttered; Wronski told Westword that Landmark was making upgrades alongside repairs, including new seats, a new concession stand, and updated amenities, and planned to "reopen early summer." The Esquire reopened on June 14, 2019, after a top-to-bottom renovation that included new, spacious seating with armrests and cupholders and upgraded concessions, though the lobby was still mid-renovation. Opening night featured Jim Jarmusch's The Dead Don't Die; the Friday–Saturday midnight series was to resume July 5. Landmark declared on Facebook: "We're back ... and better than ever!" The theater's iconic sign had by then beckoned audiences along the busy stretch of East Sixth Avenue for more than 90 years. A July 2019 Denver Post overview of the local film landscape noted the renovation was "a relief for people who feared Landmark might not have seen the value in renovating and instead would sell the real estate under the theater's East 6th Avenue perch."

Less than a year after the reopening, the COVID-19 pandemic forced the theatre to close again. Landmark stopped paying rent in April 2020. The building was owned by a family LLC known as Downing Street, which bore annual taxes of approximately $31,000. According to Goodstein, the Downing Street LLC descended from the fortune of the Fontius family, "whose house had to come down to make way for the Hiawatha Theatre." He wrote that "for years the Fontius family was renowned for its show business" and that after leaving Sixth and Downing, family members lived at 556 Circle Drive. No other source in the available record corroborates or elaborates on this provenance.

In August 2020, Downing Street listed the 9,175-square-foot (852.4 m^{2}) building for sale at $3.3 million through Unique Properties, whose executive vice president Tim Finholm described it as "a generational asset." The listing noted the building had 25-foot (7.6 m) ceilings, 28 parking spaces, and a new roof and interior. Landmark's lease was set to expire in 2024. By September 2020, The Gazette reported the Esquire was "up for sale and not expected to reopen as a movie theater."

Finholm later recalled that "most people looked at wanting to redevelop the property but there was too much lease term left on the lease for a developer. They wanted to go around and redevelop the property now rather than wait out the tenant." Goodstein wrote that the Esquire "struggled to regain its élan" after the 2019 reopening and that "the shutdown associated with the outbreak of COVID in 2020 badly hurt it." By May 2021, Landmark was back in good standing with the building's owners. The Esquire reopened on May 21, 2021; the Mayan had reopened in January 2021 and Landmark's Greenwood Village location on May 14, while the Chez Artiste remained closed.

== Sale, closure, and redevelopment plans ==
Sam Leger and Tim Finholm of Unique Properties, a South Broadway-based commercial real estate firm, purchased the Esquire building for $2.1 million in 2021. Finholm and Leger had originally been hired to market the property for sale; Franklin 10 LLC was formed from the transaction. Landmark Theatres continued to operate the Esquire as a tenant after the sale, with its lease set to expire in July 2024 and no renewal option.

=== Closure announcement and preservation campaign ===
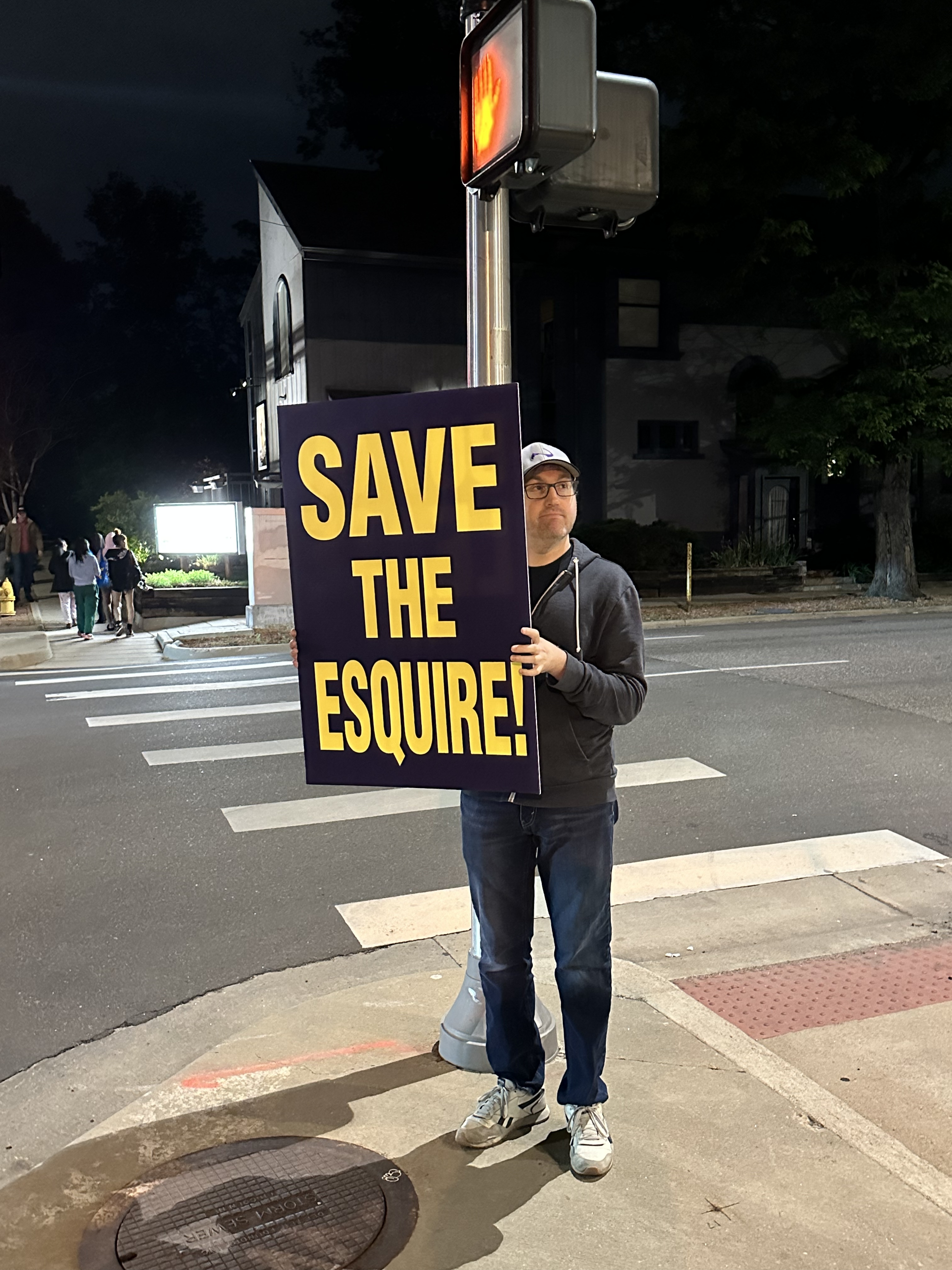
"Save the Esquire" sign displayed at the theater during the 2023–2024 preservation campaign.

In late October 2023, the building's owners submitted redevelopment plans to Denver's Department of Community Planning and Development, proposing conversion of the theatre into restaurant, office, and retail spaces. BusinessDen reported the filing on November 13, 2023. The Denver Gazette covered the story on November 15, followed by 9News on November 17, Westword on December 1, Denver7 on December 3, and the Glendale Cherry Creek Chronicle on December 15.

Jolee Harston, whose grandmother had attended the Esquire in the 1950s and '60s, launched a "Save the Esquire" campaign through the Instagram account @savetheesquire. A separate group also launched a "Save The Esquire" movement with an online petition and t-shirts, seeking to secure historical landmark designation for the building. Harston visited the theatre "almost weekly" for independent films and its "late-night $5 movie series" and planned to submit a historic landmark designation application in April 2024. Harston began the landmark preservation request process on December 5, 2023. The petition gathered more than 2,500 signatures by early December 2023 and exceeded 5,000 supporters by March 2024. At the time of the initial reporting, the Esquire's marquee read "May the odds be ever in our favor" during a screening of The Hunger Games, a double meaning not lost on preservation supporters. Matt Tourresani, who lived next door to the theatre's parking lot, was among the neighborhood residents who spoke in favor of preservation.

Sam Bryant, a student at Arapahoe High School, created a senior-year capstone project in an effort to save the theater, attempting to preserve it through landmark designation, though the effort was unsuccessful.

Dr. Vincent Piturro called the plan to retain the Esquire sign on the redeveloped building "a bit cruel." Denver had already lost two other cinemas, the Continental and the Elvis, earlier in 2023.

When the plans first surfaced, co-owner Leger was noncommittal, telling Westword: "We don't have any plans at the moment to do anything to anything. We just made a submittal."

=== Formal closure ===
On March 20, 2024, Landmark Theatres president Kevin Holloway confirmed the Esquire's closure (four years short of the theater's 100th anniversary) citing the company's evaluation of "this market and our long-term business strategy." Co-owner Sam Leger of Franklin 10 LLC said the owners had been unable to find a replacement theatre tenant. The building was to be repurposed for upscale restaurants and retail use. Landmark's Mayan, Chez Artiste, and Greenwood Village locations were to remain open but just weeks after the Esquire closure in August 2024, the Chez Artiste, was also closed permanently.

The theater's final weekend of midnight screenings featured 2001: A Space Odyssey, which drew long lines on the evening of Friday, July 12. The Esquire's last day of operation was July 18, 2024, when its lease expired without an option for renewal. The final two screenings, that evening, were MaXXXine at 7 PM and A Quiet Place: Day One at 7:05 PM. The marquee read "Thank you for 97 years."

=== Adaptive reuse and redevelopment ===
The Denver Landmark Preservation Commission unanimously approved the redevelopment plan on March 19, 2024. Although the Esquire is located within the Alamo Placita Historic District, Crowther's 1965 alterations fall outside the district's period of significance (1889–1942), and the property is listed as non-contributing in the district's designation application. The building is not individually landmarked. Amanda Weston of Denver's Community Planning and Development department noted that landmark status "does not affect the use of a building" and that adaptive reuse is "highly supported in Denver." The property is in Council District 5, then represented by Amanda Sawyer.

The owners criticized Crowther's design as boxy and monolithic, saying the building needed to be better integrated into the neighborhood.

The redevelopment, one of Denver's first projects through the city's Adaptive Reuse program, was designed by Neo Studio, a Denver firm on Walnut Street led by partner Michael Noda. The plan called for enlarging the building from 9,175 square feet by more than 6,000 square feet to a total of approximately 15,800 square feet on a 0.39 acres (1,600 m^{2}) lot. The first floor would house two units of approximately 3,675 square feet (341.4 m^{2}) each for retail and restaurant use; the upper level would contain approximately 8,500 square feet of office space with a conference room and balcony. An addition on the south side would extend into the existing parking lot, with new entrances on the north and south sides and awnings.

The theatre's mezzanine would be demolished, and skylights would be added to the roof. The plan specified ribbon-style windows inspired by Crowther's other works, with numerous additional windows cut into the concrete walls. Addition materials included Summit Brick in the "Blake Street" color, anodized aluminum storefront in black, and Techwood manufactured wood soffit in "Peruvian Teak." The commission's staff recommended approval with conditions relating to brick color, brick size, and light fixture locations. Demolition as a percentage of each elevation was specified at 24.76 percent (north), 10.52 percent (Downing Street), 27.89 percent (south), 13.02 percent (alley), and 4.32 percent (roof).

The building would not be demolished. The three iconic Esquire marquee signs and existing theatre doors were to remain, with the signs refurbished and prominently featured in the new design. A plaque commemorating the theatre's history would be displayed in the building. Spokeswoman Wendy Aiello, quoted on behalf of the owners, confirmed these preservation elements alongside plans for wider eight-foot sidewalks, planters, and trees.

Steven Simard, president of the Alamo Placita Neighbors Association, praised the adaptive reuse plans: "The plans we have seen for the adaptive reuse of the Esquire Theatre are terrific. The building's owners and their design teams have proven that creativity can allow an old building to serve a new purpose in a historic neighborhood." John Deffenbaugh of Historic Denver compared the approach favorably to the threatened demolition of El Chapultepec. Comparable Denver adaptive reuse projects cited included REI at Confluence Park and Cerebral Brewing on East Colfax Avenue. Construction was estimated to run from June 2024 to January 2025.

=== Landmark Theatres corporate context ===
The Esquire's closure coincided with broader financial difficulties at Landmark Theatres' parent company. In 2024, Fortress Credit Corp. sued Charles Cohen for defaulting on a $534 million loan backed by Landmark and other assets, and a New York judge set a November 8, 2024 foreclosure auction of the collateral. Reporting on the litigation noted that Landmark had already "lost leases and closed locations" in several cities, including Denver. At the November 8 auction, Landmark drew no bidders, while Fortress acquired other Cohen assets, including the Curzon cinema chain, through credit bids.

== Programming and cultural significance ==
The Esquire's programming ranged from mainstream prestige releases to independent, foreign-language, and avant-garde films.

The Esquire frequently served as the exclusive Denver venue for independent and specialty films. Robert Altman's Short Cuts played in 70mm at the Esquire in 1993. In the summer of 1997, Ulee's Gold, starring Peter Fonda, opened exclusively at the Esquire and remained in first run long after mainstream blockbusters such as Batman & Robin and The Lost World had left their screens; at its peak the film expanded to several suburban locations. In September 1999 a digitally renovated version of the Beatles' Yellow Submarine, presented in DTS digital stereo sound, played a one-week engagement at the Esquire. For the first time in the United States, the screening included the animated sequence for "Hey Bulldog," a John Lennon composition that had been cut from the original American release. In 2002, 2001: A Space Odyssey opened at the Esquire in one of only two new 70mm prints, "featuring a digitally restored and remastered sound track, that Warner Bros. Pictures prepared last year to 'celebrate' '2001' in 2001." Kenneth Branagh's Hamlet also screened in 70mm in 1996.

Other documented screenings included Fargo (1996), which featured the breakout performance of Denver-born John Carroll Lynch, Nick Broomfield's Kurt & Courtney (1998) — a documentary about Kurt Cobain and Courtney Love that had been pulled from that year's Sundance Film Festival under threat of legal action by Love, which the Esquire picked up for a Denver run in June 1998 Princess Mononoke (1999), and Bowling for Columbine (2002), which played to a 90-percent-full house and received a standing ovation. Al Gore's climate documentary An Inconvenient Truth arrived in Colorado on June 9, 2006, showing at the Esquire. That same year, Who Killed the Electric Car? made its Denver debut at the Esquire in a special screening before beginning a longer theatrical run on July 14. Laurent Cantet's Heading South (2005), starring Charlotte Rampling as a 55-year-old Wellesley professor of French literature traveling to Haiti, opened at the Esquire on September 8, 2006. In June 2011 Shayvision, a film chronicling the life of former CU Buff and nationally recognized artist Shay Davis, had its Colorado premiere at the Esquire. In 2022, the Esquire screened Stamplickers, a locally produced science-fiction film by the Denver art collective Phantasmagoria.

Sara Horle, who grew up with her sister Kate less than a block from the Esquire on Downing Street, saw The Goodbye Girl there in 1977 at age six. In a 2024 letter to the Denver Post, Harry Puncec of Lakewood recalled Saturday morning children's matinees at the Esquire in the early 1950s, describing programs of approximately fifteen cartoons, an episode from a fifteen-part serial, and a feature-length Western; he and his brothers each received a quarter and walked from their home a few blocks away on Emerson Street.

On June 19, 2024, the Esquire Theatre hosted the Denver premiere of the independent feature film Breakup Season, directed by H. Nelson Tracey, who grew up blocks away from the theatre. The event included cast and crew in attendance and was part of the movie's regional theatrical and festival release. It would be the last premiere event to be held at the Esquire before closing.

=== Rocky Horror Picture Show and LGBTQ+ community ===
The Esquire became one of the longest-running venues in the United States for midnight screenings of The Rocky Horror Picture Show, featured as part of the theatre's "Midnight Madness weekend series" alongside The Room on Friday and Saturday nights. Denver was one of only five American cities (alongside New York, San Francisco, Houston, and Los Angeles) that could claim a quarter-century of continuous showings by the year 2000, and was identified as one of the few cities that had never stopped showing the film since its original 1975 release.

Before moving to the Esquire around 1992, Rocky Horror had screened at the Ogden Theatre, where costumed viewers and actors often blended in with the eclectic East Colfax Avenue scene. Goodstein corroborated that "after the Ogden closed, the Esquire sometimes had midnight films, including the Rocky Horror Show." At the Esquire, the film screened at midnight on Saturdays, consistently drawing approximately 115 costumed, dialogue-shouting, paper-tossing devotees as of 1990. Mindy Posey of Landmark Theatre Corp. attributed the film's enduring theatrical appeal to the audience participation experience, observing that half the reason people attended was for the participation and that the effect would be lost on home video.

By the 2020s, Colorado's Elusive Ingredient performed monthly at the Esquire. The cast described the theatre as "more than a valued performance space," calling it "our home... a community space of inclusivity and opportunity." Preservation activist Jolee Harston recalled that her first visit to the Esquire was a midnight Rocky Horror screening when she was 17.

==== Audience participation ====
The audience participation that defined the Rocky Horror experience at the Esquire followed traditions that had developed nationally since the late 1970s. Accounts differed on where the practice originated: one history placed it in Los Angeles, where a group of regular attendees began singing along with musical numbers, while another traced it to the Waverly Theatre in New York, where fans dressed as characters for a Halloween 1976 showing. 20th Century Fox marketed the film as a midnight movie in the 1980s, and well-attended showings became participatory events. Audiences brought props: rice to throw during the opening wedding scene, newspapers to hold over their heads during an on-screen rainstorm, and toast and toilet paper to hurl during other sequences. Actors dressed as characters moved through the aisles, sometimes sitting with viewers, sometimes standing in front of the screen, performing original dialogue alongside the film's lines.

==== Colorado's Elusive Ingredient ====
Colorado's Elusive Ingredient, an all-volunteer shadow cast based at the Esquire, performed every weekend with the movie beginning in 2000. Cast member Scott Sworts, an architect trainee, was among those quoted in the Denver Post's coverage of the 25th anniversary, noting Denver's distinction as one of the few cities with an unbroken run of the film. In 2013, Colorado's Elusive Ingredient set the world record for the largest Rocky Horror Picture Show performance, with more than 8,500 people attending a screening at Red Rocks Amphitheatre.

==== 25th anniversary (2000) ====
For the 25th anniversary of Rocky Horror in October 2000, the Esquire held midnight showings with a costume contest on both Friday and Saturday nights. Landmark city manager David Kimball expected the 450-seat house to fill both evenings. Tickets were $7.75 each, available only at the door beginning at 11 p.m., with no advance sales. Earlier that year, when the Elusive Ingredient began performing before and during Saturday midnight showings, tickets were listed at $7.50, with audience participation kits distributed to attendees.

==== Cultural significance ====
The Esquire's Rocky Horror screenings held particular importance for the LGBTQ+ community. Rocky Horror was characterized as "an iconic cinematic milestone for the LGBTQ+ community," and the theater served as what Westword described as a safe haven for art lovers and marginalized groups. When the Esquire's closing was announced in 2024, Colorado's Elusive Ingredient issued a statement describing the theater as their home and "a place where the queer, artsy and weird are celebrated," adding that they would not stop fighting for the space to remain open as a theater.

The Esquire's support for such programming dated to at least 1987, when under Landmark's operation the theatre extended its engagement of the Merchant Ivory film Maurice, covered by Out Front, Colorado's LGBT newspaper, as a significant screening for its readership.

=== Midnight Madness ===
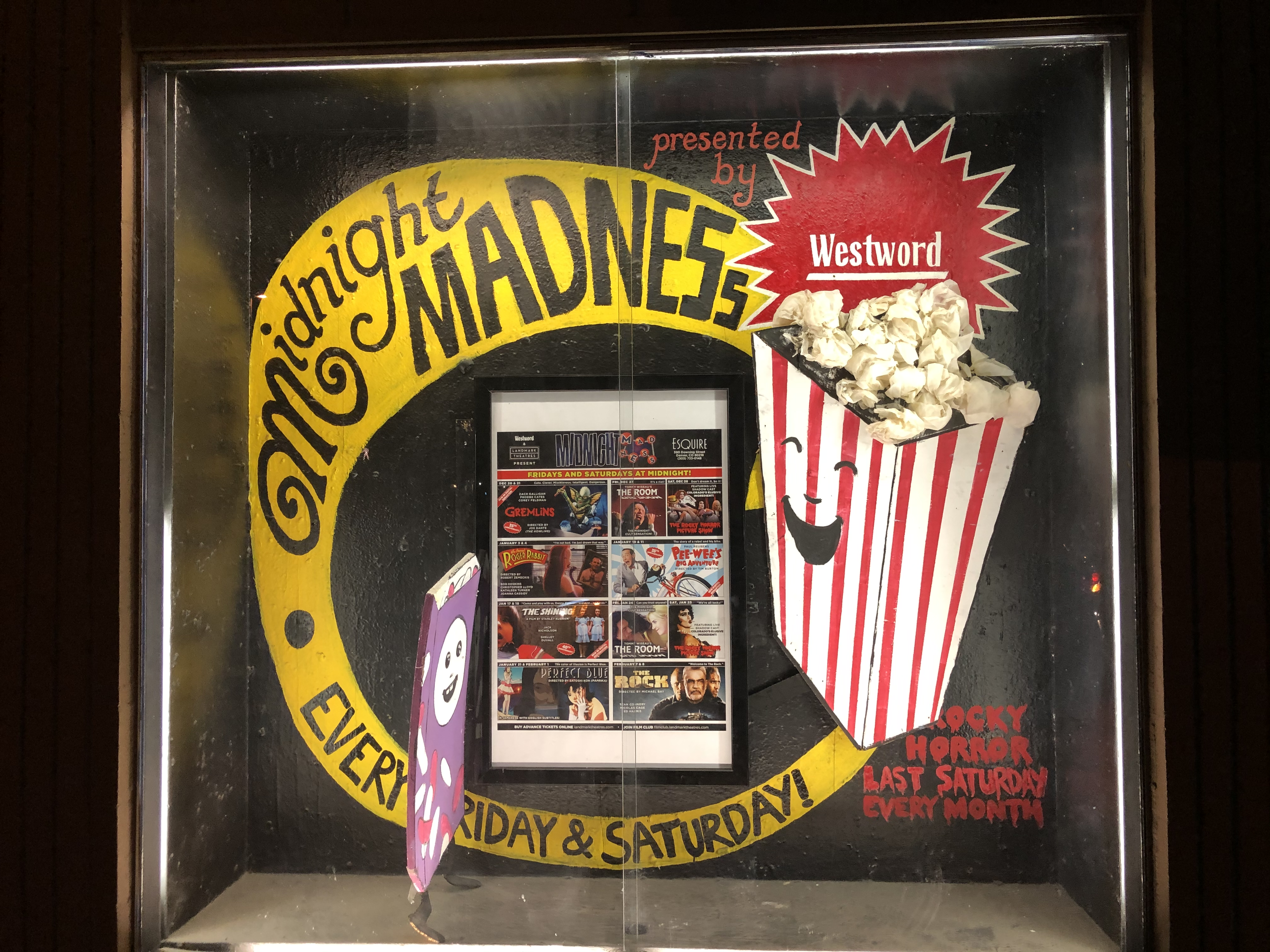
Last Midnight Madness schedule before COVID lockdowns

Apart from its Rocky Horror screenings, the Esquire ran a long-standing Friday and Saturday midnight movie series variously known as Midnight Madness or CineInsomnia. The series programmed cult favorites, genre films, and occasional Denver or Colorado premieres. A 2012 Denver Post column described it: "The Esquire Theatre, which turns 85 this year at 590 Downing St., still rocks its popular midnight series on Fridays (and Saturdays), featuring the movies fans know by heart."

In 2006 the series featured Jaws ("Now that's scary, kids"), The City of Lost Children over Thanksgiving weekend ("the perfect French oddity for Midnight Madness"), and Die Hard during the holiday season, all at $7. In July 2007 the Thai martial-arts film Dynamite Warrior had its Denver premiere as part of the series, also at $7. David Fincher's Fight Club also appeared in the midnight rotation.

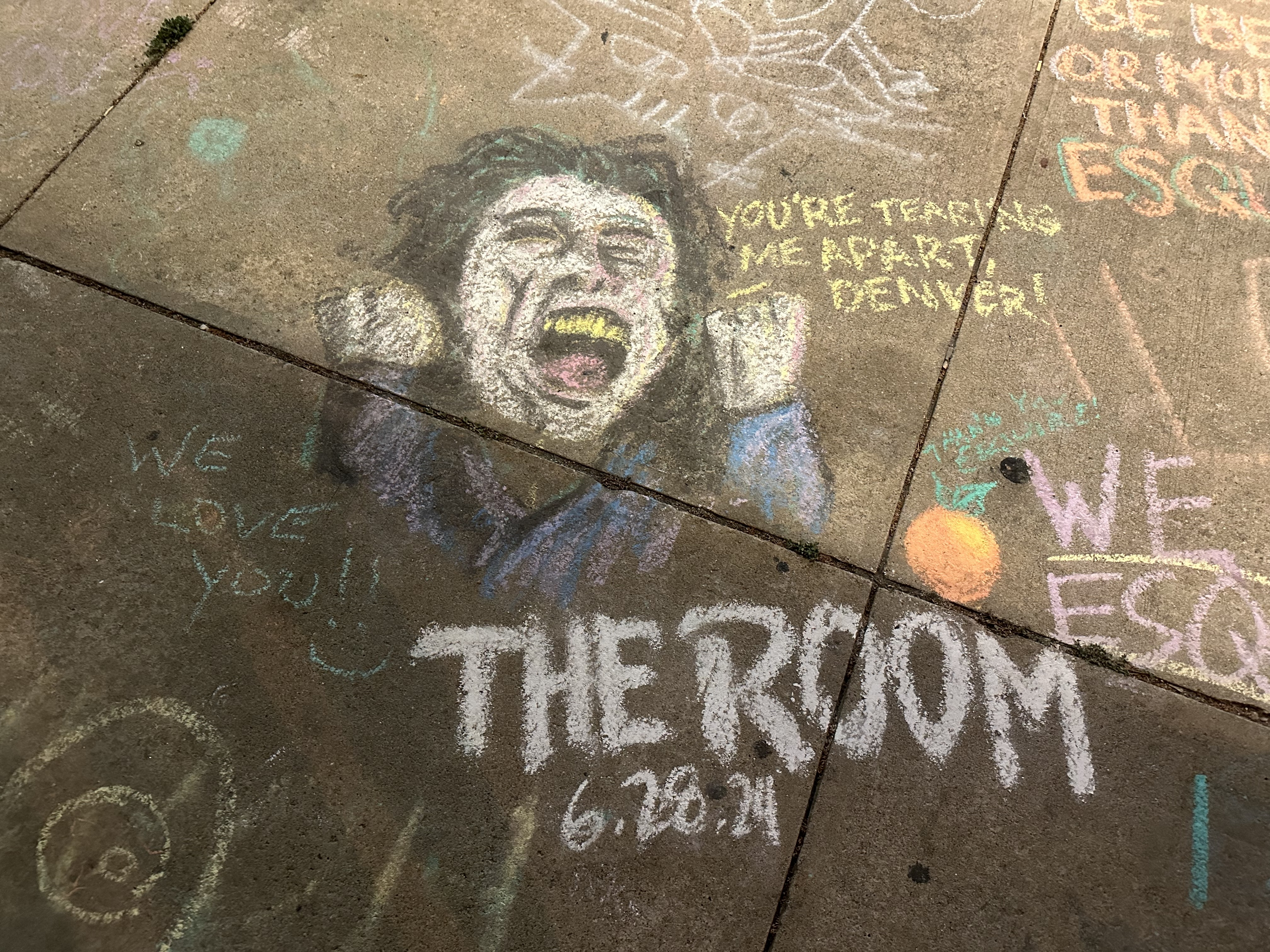
Sidewalk chalk portrait of Tommy Wiseau in his signature pose from The Room, drawn outside the Esquire during its final weekend of operation in July 2024. The text reads "You're tearing me apart, Denver!" Farewell messages from patrons surround the drawing.

For Valentine's weekend 2009 the Esquire programmed midnight showings of Eternal Sunshine of the Spotless Mind at $7.25. In 2010 the series gave Colorado premieres to Birdemic: Shock and Terror at $7.25 and The Room, the Tommy Wiseau film widely regarded as one of the worst movies ever made; a 2010 Colorado Daily piece called it "the worst movie of all time," adding that it "makes Wiseau the new Ed Wood." Tommy Wiseau appeared at Esquire screenings of The Room, which the Denver Gazette described as "life-changing" weird nights. A 2012 schedule included Black Swan, Scott Pilgrim vs. the World, Ghostbusters, and Back to the Future.

The theatre also hosted Hitchcock festivals, and a 1984 screening of the Talking Heads concert film Stop Making Sense was recalled as "an entire dance party."

The midnight series was suspended during the Esquire's 2018–2019 closure for water damage and resumed on July 5, 2019, following the theater's renovation and reopening.

=== Historical projection technology ===
The Esquire was equipped with Panavision and DeLuxe Color projection technology by 1967. The theater's 70mm projection capability distinguished it among Denver venues. In October 1993 Robert Altman's Short Cuts played in 70mm at the Esquire, Kenneth Branagh's Hamlet screened in 70mm in 1996, and in 2001 the theater screened 2001: A Space Odyssey from one of only two new 70mm prints that Warner Bros. Pictures had prepared with a digitally restored and remastered soundtrack.

The logistics of film delivery to the Esquire reflected the physical demands of repertory exhibition. Each showing required octagonal metal boxes housing an average of six reels of film totaling fifty pounds, shipped cross-country. On days when the theater was not open for a matinee, its bulky art-house prints had to be delivered to the dry cleaner next door on Downing Street.

=== Cultural commentary ===
Dr. Vincent Piturro, a professor of film and media studies at Metropolitan State University of Denver, described the Esquire as "a cultural icon" and "an aesthetic icon," crediting the theatre with inspiring his career; he had been a patron since the 1990s. Denver "once boasted as many as 66 movie theaters," according to the Glendale Cherry Creek Chronicle. By the time of its closure, the Esquire was one of the few remaining standalone neighborhood theaters in Denver not located in an indoor mall. In March 2024, Denver Gazette senior arts journalist John Moore compiled a column of reader memories spanning six decades of Esquire attendance.

In a 2005 retrospective marking the Mayan's 75th anniversary, Denver Post film critic Lisa Kennedy described the Mayan and the Esquire as "two of Denver's art-house stalwarts." Landmark city manager David Kimball said: "The community has embraced these theaters for many, many years. I think they will continue to do so, and this is just a way for us to say thanks."

== Historical admission prices ==
Documented admission prices at the Hiawatha/Esquire
Year	Context	Price	Equivalent
1932	Symphony of Six Million (Depression-era neighborhood run)	$0.10–$0.25	equivalent to $2.36 in 2025–equivalent to $5.90 in 2025
1942	Opening week (wartime, first-run)	$0.10–$0.60	equivalent to $1.97 in 2025–equivalent to $11.82 in 2025
1949	Hamlet (reserved-seat roadshow)	$1.20–$2.40	equivalent to $16.24 in 2025–equivalent to $32.48 in 2025
1956	Standard admission (summer pricing)	$0.75–$1.00	equivalent to $8.88 in 2025–equivalent to $11.84 in 2025
2000	The Rocky Horror Picture Show midnight showing	$7.75	equivalent to $14.49 in 2025
2000	Rocky Horror 25th anniversary showing	$7.50	equivalent to $14.02 in 2025
2002	"Direct This!" Film Club series	$4.50–$5.50	equivalent to $8.06 in 2025–equivalent to $9.85 in 2025
2005	75th anniversary screenings	$0.75	equivalent to $1.24 in 2025
2006–2007	Midnight Madness series	$7.00	equivalent to $11.18 in 2025
2009	General admission; matinee	$9.75; $7.25	equivalent to $14.63 in 2025; equivalent to $10.88 in 2025
2012	85th anniversary screening	$5.00	equivalent to $7.01 in 2025
2023	National Cinema Day	$4.00	equivalent to $4.23 in 2025
2023	Late-night $5 movie series	$5.00	equivalent to $5.28 in 2025

The price points are not directly comparable: the 1932 figure represents affordable second-run neighborhood exhibition during the Great Depression; the 1942 prices are first-run wartime admissions with a discounted soldiers' rate of 30¢ and a children's rate of 10¢ (all prices including tax); the 1949 figure reflects premium reserved-seat roadshow pricing at more than double the standard ticket price of the era; and the 1956 figure is a standard house admission with a weekday matinee discount.

== Ownership history ==
Ownership and operation of the Hiawatha/Esquire
Period	Owner/Operator	Notes
1927	Gordon B. Ashworth	Built and opened the Hiawatha; sold within months
c. late 1927–?	J.J. Hamilton	Installed the Orchestraphone
1933–?	International Amusement Co. (Theodore Zadra, H.A. Goodridge)	Also operated the Ogden Theatre and Liberty Bell Theater (Leadville); manager Louis Williams and entire Hiawatha staff retained
By 1936–c. 1939	Fox (as the Hiawatha)	Louis Williams documented as "former manager of the Hiawatha theatre" by June 1936, transferring within Fox to a Walsenburg city-manager role; Bill Hughes named manager May 1937 and the Hiawatha identified as "one of the Fox group, in Denver." June 1940 Daily Sentinel (Grand Junction) item identifies Ed C. Nelson as having most recently come "from the Hiawatha theatre in Denver" and references Fox booking offices in Denver, anchoring continuous Fox involvement through the c. 1939 closure.
c. 1939–1942	Closed	
1942–c. 1980	Fox-Intermountain Theaters (as the Esquire)	Reopened November 10, 1942 with Thunder Birds; Helen Jean Spiller, "Denver's first woman theater manager," ran the Esquire with an all-female staff from the 1942 opening until approximately 1954, when she was promoted within the Fox organization (Note: The exact end of Fox-Intermountain operation is not documented in the available sources; "c. 1980" reflects the transition to Landmark Theatres in that year.)
1980–2024	Landmark Theatres (operator/lessee)	Began operating the Esquire in 1980; co-managed with the Mayan by 1986; known Esquire managers included Rebecca Cole (1996), with David Swanson serving as manager of Landmark's Denver operations in 1988; Landmark chain sold by Mark Cuban/2929 Entertainment to Cohen Media Group in 2018
By 1980–2021	Downing Street LLC (building owner)	Family LLC that owned the building while Landmark leased it. Phil Goodstein attributed the ownership to the Fontius family — whose previous house, he wrote, "had to come down to make way for the Hiawatha Theatre" — implying continuous family ownership from the 1927 construction, though no other source corroborates this provenance. (Note: The exact start of Downing Street LLC's ownership is not documented in the contemporary newspaper record; the LLC is confirmed as building owner during the 1980–2021 Landmark lessee period.)
2021–present	Franklin 10 LLC (Sam Leger, Tim Finholm; building owner)	Purchased for $2.1 million; Landmark continued as tenant until July 2024
July 18, 2024	Closed	Landmark's lease expired with no renewal option; adaptive reuse approved by Denver Landmark Preservation Commission March 19, 2024
