= Orchestraphone =

Late-1920s non-synchronous disc sound system for film accompaniment

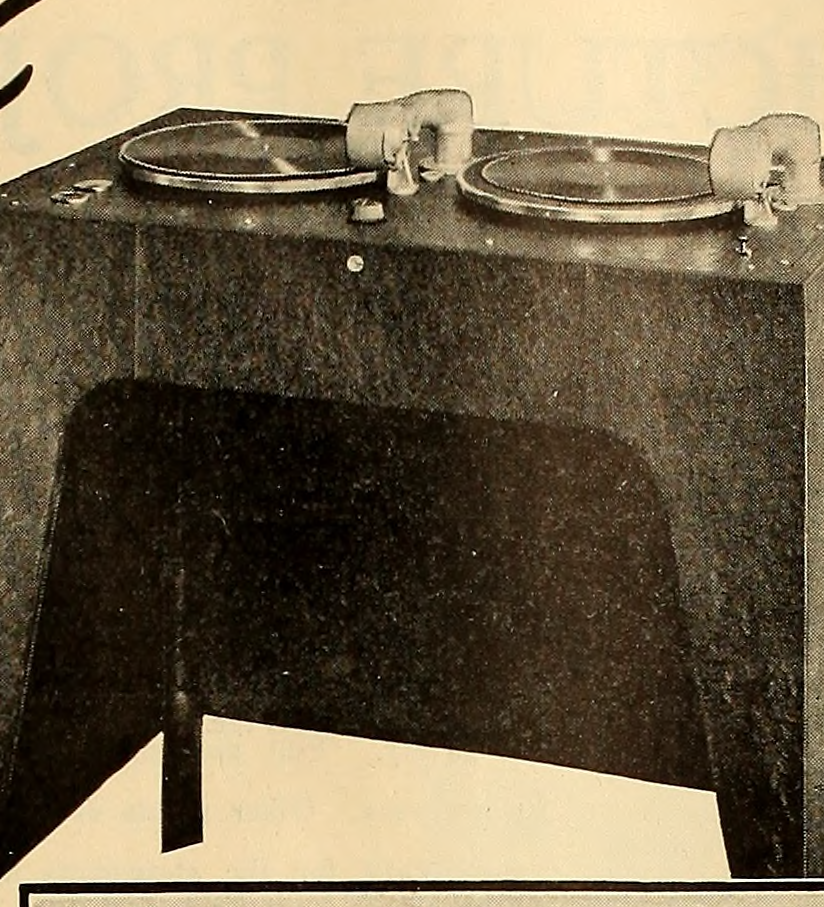
- The Orchestraphone Junior Model in its steel "desk-type" cabinet, from a 1928 advertisement
- Type: Non-synchronous disc sound-reproduction system
- Inception: c. 1927
- Manufacturer: National Theatre Supply Company
- Models: Orchestraphone Junior Model

The Orchestraphone was a non-synchronous, disc-based sound-reproduction system marketed in the United States by the National Theatre Supply Company during the late 1920s. It was designed to supply recorded musical accompaniment for silent films by playing 78-rpm records through turntables, a fader, an amplifier, and loudspeakers, without mechanically locking the record player to the projector. The Orchestraphone was one of dozens of competing non-synchronous units sold to exhibitors during the transition from silent film to sound film, and it should not be regarded as a dominant system; the historian Emily Thompson notes that the 1929 Film Daily Year Book listed forty-eight other manufacturers of non-synchronous units, and a single rival manufacturer, Good-All, claimed to be shipping 250 units a month.

== Background ==
The shift from silent film to synchronized sound in the late 1920s was not an abrupt change from live accompaniment to talking pictures. While audiences were hearing of Vitaphone, Movietone, and "talking pictures," many theaters still booked silent films, and full synchronized-sound installations were expensive and tightly licensed. Synchronized systems depended on costly, Western Electric-controlled recording and reproduction equipment: Western Electric granted the Vitaphone company the exclusive right to use its recording apparatus, to sublicense other producers, and to license the reproduction equipment installed in theaters, with its subsidiary Electrical Research Products, Inc. (ERPI) handling theater wiring and the associated music-publisher sublicensing.

Non-synchronous reproduction offered exhibitors a cheaper alternative. Such systems made no claim to mechanical interlock with the projector and could run on commercial records, manual cueing, and whatever amplification a theater could afford or already possessed. The practice was first improvised by projectionists rather than introduced by manufacturers. Thompson describes Henri Tussenbrook of the Majestic Theatre in Hartford, Connecticut, connecting a standard electric turntable to the theater's Vitaphone sound system in 1927 and using commercial Victor records to accompany silent films; for Fox's The Loves of Carmen he assembled a score from twenty-eight records.

== Equipment and operation ==
National Theatre Supply advertised the Orchestraphone Junior Model in The Motion Picture Projectionist in 1928. An October 1928 advertisement priced the Junior Model at "$750.00 f.o.b. Chicago" complete with one horn, described "a new change-over device," and said the machine's features were housed in "a beautifully finished, all-steel cabinet of the desk type." The same advertisement claimed that "any person of average intelligence" could "cue the picture" and promised "the music of the world's greatest artists—perfectly reproduced."

The operating principle was straightforward. One record played while the next was cued on a second turntable; the operator used a fader—the "change-over" control—to lower the outgoing record and raise the incoming one, producing continuous accompaniment from separate discs. If a theater already had amplification and loudspeakers for sound films, the non-synchronous unit could be connected to that equipment; otherwise the exhibitor had to add amplification. That demand supported a growing market in theatrical sound equipment; Macy Manufacturing Corp. of Brooklyn, for example, advertised itself in 1929 as "Largest Horn Makers Supplying the Theatrical World."

A cueing economy formed around the practice. Victor marketed non-synchronous records as "Pict-Ur-Music," and the Scoredisc service offered a library of more than a thousand indexed music and effects discs supplied with paired cardboard cue discs that fitted over the records on each turntable, with cuts marking the cues and printed descriptions indicating when to fade to the other turntable.

Professional cueing services also developed. In a notice dated January 13, 1929, The Film Daily reported from Chicago that Marie Pierson had organized the Exhibitors' Cueing Service to supply theater owners equipped with non-synchronous machines with cue sheets for standard records used on such devices. The notice stated that Pierson had been "identified with the development of theater cueing since Orchestraphone was placed in the market by National Theater Supply Co.," and that each film submitted received a detailed cue sheet listing the name, manufacturer, and number of each record. A later Film Daily notice reported that Pierson subsequently joined the cueing department of the Brunswick-Balke-Collender company.

== Marketing and reception ==
National Theatre Supply advertising printed exhibitor testimonials claiming that the Orchestraphone increased patronage and improved audience response. A November 1928 advertisement reported that owners commonly cited patronage increases of "10 to 50 per cent," which the advertisement attributed "solely to Orchestraphone"—promotional language rather than audited box-office data. The same advertisement printed statements from several exhibitors: the manager of Denver's Hiawatha Theater said that, after polling selected patrons, "ninety-five per cent" preferred the Orchestraphone to the theater's former five-piece orchestra; Alpha Fowler of the Empire Theatre in Atlanta said he believed the device would help more than double the business of other suburban Atlanta houses; W. W. Henderson of the Folly Theatre said his house had been built around the Orchestraphone with special tone chambers; and G. B. Elam of the Princess Theatre in Winnsboro, Louisiana, reported a successful first showing at advanced admission prices. These were advertised testimonials carried in a trade publication that also carried the manufacturer's advertising, not independent performance data.

The Denver case illustrates the competitive pressure behind such testimonials. The Hiawatha Theater was a newly built neighborhood house at Sixth Avenue and Downing Street; under new owner J. J. Hamilton it installed an Orchestraphone in late December 1927, which the Rocky Mountain News described as "the most recent of the talking motion picture machines" and reported to be the only one in Denver.

== The name "Orchestraphone" ==
The name "Orchestraphone" predated the cinema device. In 1879 the British illusionists Maskelyne and Cooke presented an "Electric and Automatic Orchestraphone," based on Schalkenbach's earlier Orchestre Militaire Electro Moteur, an electromechanical imitation-orchestra instrument of the nineteenth-century stage. The Limonaire firm's "Orchestrophone" fairground organs were a separate branch of the same naming tradition: large mechanical organs with pipes, drums, cymbals, and animated figures intended to project the sound of an ensemble without live musicians. These earlier devices were not direct technical ancestors of the cinema machine; the connection is one of naming, the promise of orchestral abundance from a machine.

== Decline ==
The Orchestraphone's market was short-lived. Non-synchronous units were useful only while silent product still required accompaniment and synchronized installations remained costly or unevenly distributed. Thompson notes that by 1930 silent-film production had essentially ceased and optical sound-on-film had displaced disc-based Vitaphone; once films carried their own integrated soundtracks, the need for manually cued accompaniment collapsed, and the projectionists who had briefly enjoyed higher pay when turntables entered their booths returned to threading projectors at their former rates. Similar disc units lingered for intermission music, announcements, and exit cues, but their principal role in film exhibition had passed.

== Historiography ==
The cultural historian Emily Thompson discusses the Orchestraphone and related non-synchronous turntables in her essay "Remix Redux" (2009), framing them as a "curious prehistory" of later remix and turntable aesthetics while explicitly cautioning that there is no apparent direct connection between the theater units of the late 1920s and the turntable practices later associated with hip-hop performers. Thompson argues that the equipment carried a latent potential for an operator-driven, recombinant sound practice that the standardizing film industry did not pursue, channeling the technology toward uniformity instead; on her account the 1920s booth operator used records to enforce a standardized accompaniment, the reverse of the later DJ's use of records against standardization.
