= Cultural Worker =

1970s US socialist journal

Cultural Worker was an American socialist journal published by the Amherst Cultural Worker’s Collective in the 1970s in Amherst, Massachusetts. The magazine contained poetry, reviews, graphics, songs, and articles. Much of their work aimed to contribute towards the Women's Liberation Movement of the 1970s.

The collective’s statement on the opening of the second issue:

Cultural Worker is an attempt to start bridging the gap in US society between ‘culture’ and the work we do to survive. Besides the journal we have worked on posters, photography, people’s history, poetry, a songbook, leaflets, and cultural analysis.

Some of their posters in 1976 included "The Liberty Tree" and the "Ganienkeh Indian Project: Mowhawk Nation" The magazine was also mentioned and advertised in other periodicals such as HERESIES and Out Front.
