= Chez Artiste =

Former art-house movie theater in Denver, Colorado

- Interactive map of Chez Artiste
- Former names: University Hills 2 (1972), University Hills 3 (1980s)
- Address: 4150 East Amherst Avenue; Denver, Colorado; United States
- Coordinates: 39°39′55″N 104°56′19″W
- Operator: Landmark Theatres (1992–2024)
- Type: Movie theater (art house)
- Screens: 3

Construction
- Opened: November 3, 1972
- Closed: August 8, 2024

The Chez Artiste was a three-screen art-house movie theater at 4150 East Amherst Avenue (2800 S. Colorado Blvd) in the University Hills area of Denver, Colorado. It opened in 1972 as the University Hills 2, a neighborhood twin cinema serving a suburban retail district, and operated for fifty-two years. By the time it closed in August 2024 it was a Landmark Theatres venue known for independent, documentary, and foreign-language film. In April 2026 the owner of the surrounding shopping center proposed demolishing the former theater as part of a redevelopment of the site.

== Origins ==
The University Hills shopping center in southeast Denver opened as an open-air center in August 1951 and was enclosed in 1976. The theater opened on November 3, 1972, as the University Hills 2, also described as the University Hills Twin Cinema. Tom Goldfarb and Marvin Davis were the original operators, and the theater opened with the films Billy Jack and Fantasia. Davis later led the family company that bought Twentieth Century-Fox in 1981 and sold it to Rupert Murdoch in 1985.

== Consolidation and the triplex years ==
The theater's independent ownership was brief. Highland Theatres, through vice president and general manager Russ Berry, acquired the University Hills Twin Cinema, in September of 1974. Commonwealth Theatres later operated the venue, and during the 1980s an adjacent storefront was converted into a third auditorium, making it the University Hills 3.

On November 23, 1983, the nearby University Hills Mall was the site of the first five-alarm fire in the Denver Fire Department's history. The fire took about five hours to bring under control, involved roughly 150 firefighters, and caused an estimated $15 million (equivalent to $48,488,139 in 2025) in damage. The theater, separated from the enclosed mall by a parking lot, was not damaged.

== United Artists and the Chez Artiste rebrand ==
In December 1988, United Artists Theatres reopened the former University Hills triplex as the Chez Artiste, a three-screen theater showing first-run foreign and American films. The refurbished theater had a new lobby, new projection, and new sound equipment. Its reopening was marked by a champagne reception and a benefit screening of Pelle the Conqueror for the Denver International Film Society. The rebranding repositioned the venue toward art-house programming rather than direct competition with suburban multiplexes.

== Landmark Theatres ==
In October 1992, Landmark Theatres, then part of the Samuel Goldwyn Theater Group, acquired the Chez Artiste from United Artists for undisclosed terms. Under Landmark the theater became part of a Denver art-house circuit that also included the Esquire Theatre in Capitol Hill and the Mayan Theatre on Broadway, an arrangement that allowed Landmark to coordinate specialized bookings, repertory programming, and audience development across multiple Denver venues. A separate institution, Denver Film, served a similar audience through its nonprofit programming, anchored after 2002 by the Starz FilmCenter, later the Sie FilmCenter.

Local coverage and patron accounts described the Chez Artiste as a community gathering place known for independent, documentary, foreign-language, and offbeat programming, where regulars recognized one another and treated the theater as a recurring social space.

== 2012 renovation and digital conversion ==
In October 2012 the Chez Artiste closed for about three weeks for renovations. During which time they upgraded to Barco digital projection, upgraded sound, added new seating with more space between rows, installed granite countertops, hung glass walls, refloored with hardwood stone, and installed new decorative lighting. The renovation coincided with the film-exhibition industry's shift from 35 mm projection to digital cinema, which changed the labor of projection and imposed capital costs on smaller venues. Robin Hyden, a Chez Artiste manager and projectionist, later reflected on the loss of analog film work, describing film splicing as work she valued and digital work as alienating.

== Accessibility ==
Local coverage and patron accounts identified the Chez Artiste as unusually accessible and socially comfortable for some older and disabled patrons, in part because its ground-level, relatively flat layout was easier to navigate than steep stadium-seating multiplexes. By comparison, Landmark's own description of the Mayan Theatre notes that two of that theater's three auditoriums are not wheelchair accessible, with films rotated through the single accessible auditorium.

== Ownership changes and decline ==
Cohen Media Group acquired Landmark Theatres in 2018. Landmark's announcement described the chain as 252 screens in 27 markets and did not disclose the sale terms. In August 2024 the Denver Gazette reported that a New York court had cleared the way for a November auction of properties owned by Charles Cohen's Cohen Realty Enterprises, including Landmark, after Fortress Credit Corp. sued over a default on a $534 million loan backed by Landmark and other assets. Citing an Advan study, Denverite reported that Denver-area theater attendance in January 2024 was about 33 percent below 2019.

== Closure ==
In July 2024 Landmark closed the Esquire Theatre, and Landmark president Kevin Holloway said the Mayan, Chez Artiste, and Greenwood Village locations would remain open. Less than three weeks later, on Friday, August 2, Chez Artiste staff were told the theater would close, and a sign the following day announced a final day of August 8, directing patrons to the Mayan and Greenwood Village. Mark Mulcahy, Landmark's head of brand and marketing, told 9News that the decision followed "regular evaluation of market dynamics and individual theatre performance," a statement that some patrons contrasted with Holloway's earlier reassurance.

The final program included The Fabulous Four, Coup!, Widow Clicquot, Thelma, and Touch. Patrons and the Denver Cinema Club organized a farewell during the closing week. The Chez Artiste closed on August 8, 2024, after fifty-two years.

The Denver Gazette reported that the closure left the Mayan and the Landmark at Greenwood Village as Landmark's remaining Denver locations, and that Denver Film was not in a position to acquire the Chez given the cost of modernizing aging theaters.

== Demolition proposal ==
In April 2026, BusinessDen reported that the owner of the shopping center, the Southern California-based Zurich Investment Co., had proposed demolishing the former theater and preparing the lot for future commercial use, with the development-review document submitted on the owner's behalf by the Farnsworth Group. The proposed future use was left undefined. Unlike the Mayan Theatre, which received Denver landmark designation in 1984, the Chez Artiste had no landmark protection.

== See also ==
- Esquire Theatre (Denver)
- Mayan Theatre
- Landmark Theatres
- Denver Film Festival
