= Alamo Placita, Denver =

Neighborhood of Denver, Colorado, United States

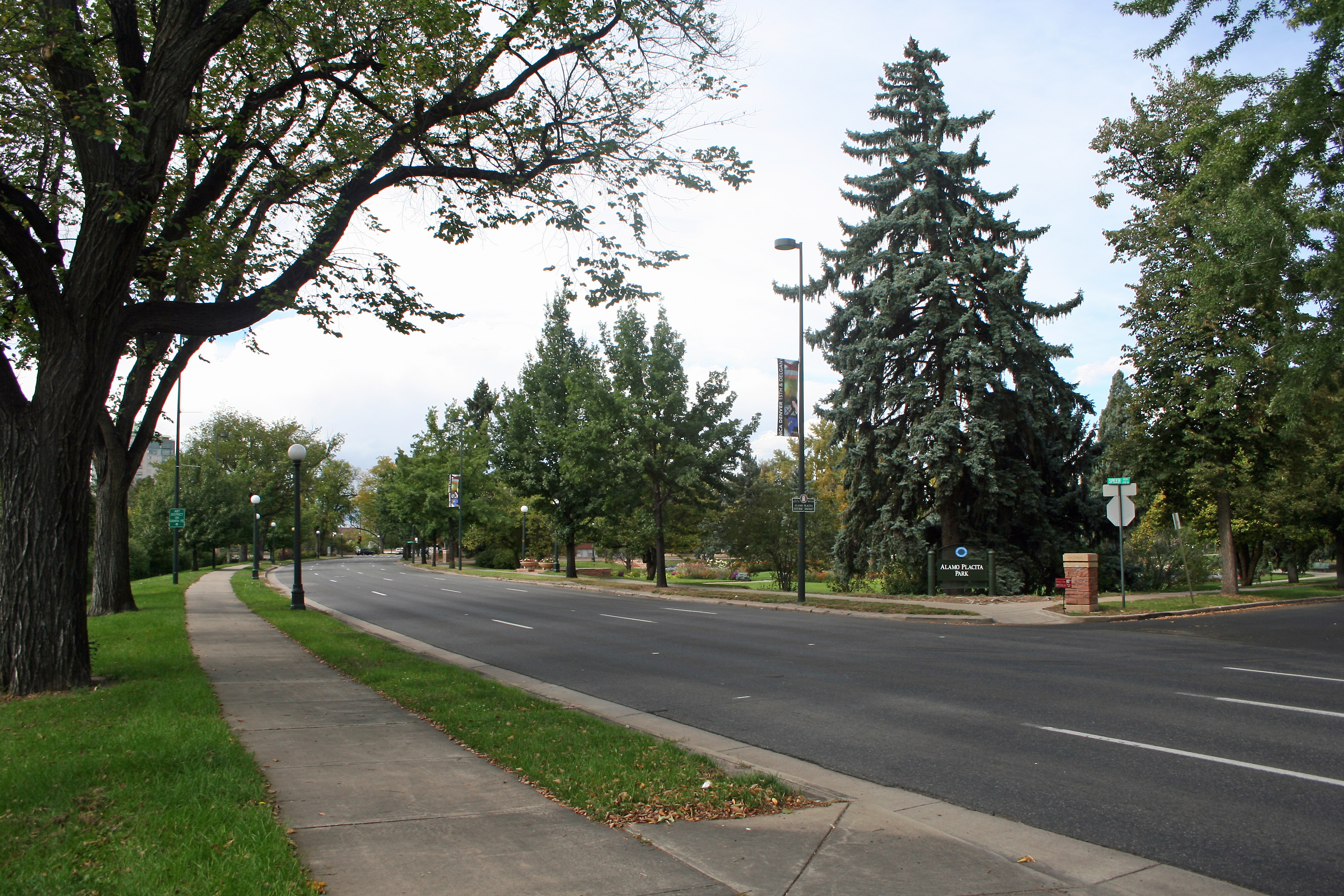
- Alamo Placita Park
- Interactive map of Alamo Placita, Denver
- Coordinates: 39.7208°N 104.9758°W
- Country: United States
- State: Colorado
- City and County: Denver
- Elevation: 5,269 ft (1,606 m)
- Time zone: UTC−07:00 (MST)
  - Summer (DST): UTC−06:00 (MDT)
- GNIS pop ID: 184889

Alamo Placita is a historic district and unofficial neighborhood of Denver, Colorado, United States. It is named after Alamo Placita Park which is located on the north side of Speer Boulevard between Ogden and Emerson Streets.

The district is bounded by Downing Street (east), Speer Boulevard (south), Pennsylvania Street (west), 6th Avenue (north) west of Clarkson Street and 7th Avenue (north) east of Clarkson Street. Alamo Placita is part of a larger official neighborhood called Speer.

== History ==
The history of the Alamo Placita Historic District tells the story of 1860s prairie land along Cherry Creek just three miles (5 km) southeast of the new town of Denver. Farsighted investor Moses Hallett, an attorney from Illinois, bought the land in 1864. Hallett’s quarter section of land became Arlington Park Addition, and later, Alamo Placita neighborhood. By 1887, Denver’s southern city limit was the northern border of Hallett’s claim (now East 6th Avenue). A road on the eastern edge of Hallett’s land, called Hallett Road, is now Downing Street. In 1889, Hallett sold his land to the Arlington Park Land and Improvement Company and became one of several investors in the company.

=== Robert W. Speer (1855-1918) ===
Robert W. Speer came to the West in 1878 seeking a cure for his tuberculosis. He recovered and exhibited boundless energy that defied any earlier malaise. Speer is remembered for becoming Denver’s first mayor under home rule in 1904, his three terms as mayor, his exuberance for Denver’s City Beautiful Movement, his support for the Denver park system, his boss-style politics, and his personal gains from real estate investments. Much less well known were Speer’s important connections with the Alamo Placita neighborhood.

Those connections included, first, the fact that Alamo Placita neighborhood was Speer’s first major real estate investment. He formed a syndicate to develop the land. When Arlington Park Addition was created, it became the first client for Speer’s newly formed real estate company. Second, Speer’s creation of an addition and then an amusement park provided him with experience as the central figure in pulling big plans together with powerful Denver men. Third, the neighborhood was his home. Robert and Kate Speer built their residence at 505 Clarkson Street (now demolished) in 1890, and they lived there until 1906.

=== Arlington Park and Chutes Park ===
The grand opening for Arlington Park was held on the Fourth of July 1892. An extravagant theatrical production, “The Last Days of Pompeii,” was the main attraction, involving 300 actors and a 54-foothigh set of Mt. Vesuvius. When Mt. Vesuvius erupted, a large fireworks display accompanied the eruption. In true Speer style, the grandeur was heavily promoted and an estimated 12,000 people attended.

The future of Arlington Park looked bright, and surely more events were anticipated. Anticipation disappeared when the 1893 Silver Crash brought the economy to a standstill. In 1898, Arlington Park reopened under the name Chutes Park. The new feature was “the chutes,” a graded waterfall that took riders in boats down into the lake at the bottom.

In May 1899, two new attractions opened. Miss Sadie Boynton, of Paris would shoot the chutes on a bicycle. Professor Barnes' herd of driving and diving elks would march up a ramp and plunge, one at a time, off a 60-foot (18 m)-high platform into a tank of water. Handbills proclaimed the park “The Coney Island of the West.”

Fires in 1901 and 1902 closed the amusement park forever, pleasing nearby neighbors who found living near the facility quite trying.

=== Arlington Park Addition ===
The 1889 Arlington Park Addition was the first and largest subdivision platted on Moses Hallett’s land. Essentially, it included almost all of the land that was not part of the amusement park. The addition went from E. 6th Avenue to approximately one-half block south of E. 4th Avenue, and from Logan Street to the alley between Corona and Downing Streets.

In January 1890, R.W. Speer and Company began accepting deposits on the property. By the end of February, 319 lots had sold for $217,000. The Rocky Mountain News observed, “R.W. Speer’s smiling face is more smiling than ever.” Notable early investors were Colonel John Arkins, owner of the Rocky Mountain News; John Cochran, the city postmaster; and T.M. Patterson, the first Democratic congressman from the State of Colorado.

The vigorous rate of growth in the Arlington Park Addition stopped in 1893. Building permits were lost for the years 1893 to 1900, but evidence points to a gradual recovery in Arlington Park home building. The new homes tended to be more modest than grand, and the new residents tended to be less well-known citizens. The neighborhood was serving as an affordable destination for new renters and first-time home-owners— particularly first-and second-generation European immigrants. Two groups of immigrants were especially predominant in Arlington Park. Scandinavian immigrants, primarily Swedish, were to make Hallett’s land their home in their new country. And later, Greeks would follow the path of the Swedes.

Half of Colorado’s Swedes lived in the Denver area in 1890. At first the Swedish residents of Alamo Placita were primarily involved in the building trades, domestic service, and gardening, and quite a few Alamo Placita homes were constructed by Swedish craftsmen. Soon, however, the Swedish-Americans began to embrace a variety of occupations. By the early 1930s, Alamo Placita gained significant numbers of Greek-Americans. Most were moving from the environs of their church north of Capitol Hill at E. 37th Avenue and Lafayette Street, the location of the first Greek Orthodox Church in Denver.

In 1933, the Greek Orthodox Church moved to 574 Pennsylvania Street. A residence on the Pennsylvania Street site was demolished and the Greeks built a new Assumption Greek Orthodox Church. The church was designed with the traditional onion-shaped domes associated with Eastern Orthodoxy. The presence of this building brought a rich, new, visible ethnic identity to Alamo Placita. This church was the central Greek church of Colorado. In 1973, the church moved to a spectacular new Assumption Greek Orthodox Church on E. Alameda Avenue.

=== Alamo Placita Development After World War II ===
With the building boom of the post-World War II years taking newer populations to the city fringe or new suburban communities, most of the Alamo Placita neighborhood continued to draw those who needed more affordable housing. Some developers demolished a few early residences to build more lucrative, multifamily apartments. Most of these new apartments were built on a relatively small scale.

According to Assessor records, by 1930 approximately 90 percent of the present Alamo Placita Historic District buildings were built; by 1940, 94 percent were built. These include single-family dwellings, multifamily dwellings, and the few commercial buildings in the district.

Neighborhood development continued with change occurring at a very slow pace, reacting to the ups and downs of the economy. During the 1960s, 1970s, and 1980s, the value of the neighborhood as a family-oriented environment close to the heart of the city was quietly rediscovered by young professionals and others. Lawyers, doctors, teachers, and businesspeople were moving into Alamo Placita in greater numbers, joining trade craftsmen, clerks, salesmen, and others. An example of one such couple is Richard and Dottie Lamm, who lived at 531 Emerson Street in the 1960s, before Lamm became a three-term governor of Colorado. The rediscovery of the neighborhood included an appreciation and respect for its architecture. Growing numbers of residents became aware of the neighborhood’s architectural integrity. Their interest led to a desire to protect their environment and learn more about neighborhood history. This in turn formed the foundation for the creation of Alamo Placita Neighbors Association.

== Architecture ==
Alamo Placita Historic District has some homes built for some early prominent Denverites, but mainly recognizes the 1889 to 1942 environment of middle-income building trades and professional people, along with early clerks, Tramway workers, railroad men, and the like. The first district residents expressed their aspirations for success in part through building their neighborhood in important architectural styles of the day. Investors who built single- and multifamily residences followed this lead. Together they created an environment of lower-scale dwellings with streetscapes that respected visually pleasing setbacks accommodating gardens, lawns, and sidewalks. The gentle intermingling of architectural styles, building materials, and individual decoration remains clearly apparent despite more recent setback violations where a few demolished original structures have been replaced. Though the scale of a few newer buildings is too large, only one of the newer noncontributing structures is in serious height violation at 12 stories.

The earliest district residences were designed in Victorian-era styles. After 1893, when the Victorian-era influence began to wane, much of the district remained undeveloped.

Alamo Placita residents were quicker than wealthier citizens to embrace the Arts and Crafts Movement, interpreted mainly in Alamo Placita through Foursquares and Bungalows. Wealthier citizens tended to express their status through the Classical Revival-style architecture of their residences. Less wealthy citizens were more open to the perceived practicality of new designs. Over time, in tandem with the Arts and Crafts influence, came a sprinkling of the popular Tudor-style dwellings, Spanish Mission-style dwellings, and others that spoke to Denver’s tenuous southwestern U.S. identity. The physical context of the district includes the small commercial buildings that were built along district borders, E. 6th Avenue, Speer Boulevard, and Downing Street.

In 2000, the Denver Landmark Preservation Commission unanimously recommended designation of the Alamo Placita Historic District based on the significance of its history, architecture, and geography. The City Council agreed, unanimously voting to approve the designation on June 12, 2000.

The Esquire Theatre at 590 Downing Street is the district's most prominent building, though because its 1965 exterior redesign by Richard L. Crowther falls outside the district's period of significance (1889-1942), it is classified as non-contributing.

== See also ==
- Bibliography of Colorado
- Geography of Colorado
- History of Colorado
- Index of Colorado-related articles
- List of Colorado-related lists
  - List of neighborhoods in Denver
  - List of populated places in Colorado
- Outline of Colorado
