= Lakeside Leagues =

Amateur and semi-professional sports leagues at Lakeside Park, near Denver

- Opening night of Lakeside Park's newly built sports stadium, June 28, 1936
- Status: Defunct
- Genre: Amateur and semi-professional sports (baseball, softball, horseshoes)
- Frequency: Seasonal
- Venue: Lakeside Park near Lakeside Amusement Park
- Locations: Lakeside, Colorado, near Denver
- Coordinates: 39.7807°N 105.0540°W
- Country: United States
- Years active: 1927–1938
- Major events: Baseball, softball, and horseshoes
- Organizer: Whitney Sporting Goods Company (several leagues)

The Lakeside Leagues were amateur and semi-professional sports competitions held at Lakeside Park, in Lakeside, Colorado, along the western edge of Denver. Games were played on sports fields adjacent to Lakeside Amusement Park. Separate baseball, softball, and horseshoe pitching teams used the park's grounds for league play. Some of the competitions were organized through Denver's Whitney Sporting Goods Company. In 1932, Lakeside Park hosted a Sunday morning baseball league, an evening softball league, and a horseshoe league.

== Leagues ==
=== Baseball ===
The Lakeside Sunday Morning Baseball League, organized by Whitney Sporting Goods, opened its 1932 season on June 5, 1932. Teams, named after their local sponsors, included Massie Grocery, Union Pacific, Vassar Park, O. P. Skaggs, Fabricant Auto, Midwest Refinery, and Denver Coal & Timber.

In 1937, the Leyden Miners led the Lakeside League standings. Later that year, the Leyden Miners won the first Colorado state semi-professional baseball tournament in Pueblo and thereafter represented Colorado in the National Baseball Congress tournament in Wichita, Kansas.

=== Softball ===
The softball league played evening games on the park diamond. The Lakeside Softball Loop was active in both 1933 and 1938, with opening games scheduled in June 1933 and May 1938.

=== Horseshoes ===
The Lakeside Whitney Horse Shoe League was also organized through Whitney Sporting Goods. Its 1932 weeknight schedule included Massie Grocery, Mile High, Merkle Grocery, Union Pacific, Vassar Park, and Colorado and Southern Railroad teams.

== 1932 softball season ==
The 1932 softball playoff bracket included the Hiawatha Theater, Fabricant Auto, the Sobule Brothers, Denver Coal & Timber, Blayney-Murphy, and the M.C.A. team.

=== Teams connected to Denver's Jewish community ===
Three Jewish softball teams competed in 1932: B'nai B'rith, the Sobule Brothers, and a third team that alternated sponsors. The third team played as Zekman Furriers in the YMCA–Whitney League and as Hiawatha Theater in the Lakeside League. In the August 1932 tournament at Lakeside, the Hiawatha Theater defeated Stearns Dairy 8–4, with Fred Zekman pitching. Zekman threw a no-hit, no-run game in July 1932. The Sobule Brothers, also played in the league, and were the winners of the Colorado state softball championship in 1931. They would make it to the state final again in 1933.

=== 1932 Playoffs and Elitch's tournament ===
In summer of 1932, a city playoff was planned combining the Lakeside and Columbine Street divisions, with finals scheduled for Lakeside. After a dispute with Lakeside's management, four teams left the planned city playoff for a separate tournament at Elitch's. Six teams played in the Elitch's tournament, they were Hiawatha Theater, the Sobule Brothers, Fabricant Auto, Denver Coal & Timber, Blayney-Murphy, and the Berkeley Boosters.

In one August 1932 playoff round at Lakeside, Hiawatha Theater shut out Fabricant Auto 2–0, the Sobule Brothers beat Denver Coal & Timber 8–2, and Blayney-Murphy defeated the M.C.A. team 2–0. Fabricant Auto won the city title at Elitch's, beating the Sobule Brothers twice.

== See also ==
- Lakeside Amusement Park
- Esquire Theatre (Denver)
- History of the Jews in Denver
- Intermountain Jewish News
