= McAllister House (Colorado Springs, Colorado) =

Historic house in Colorado, United States

- U.S. National Register of Historic Places
- Colorado State Register of Historic Properties
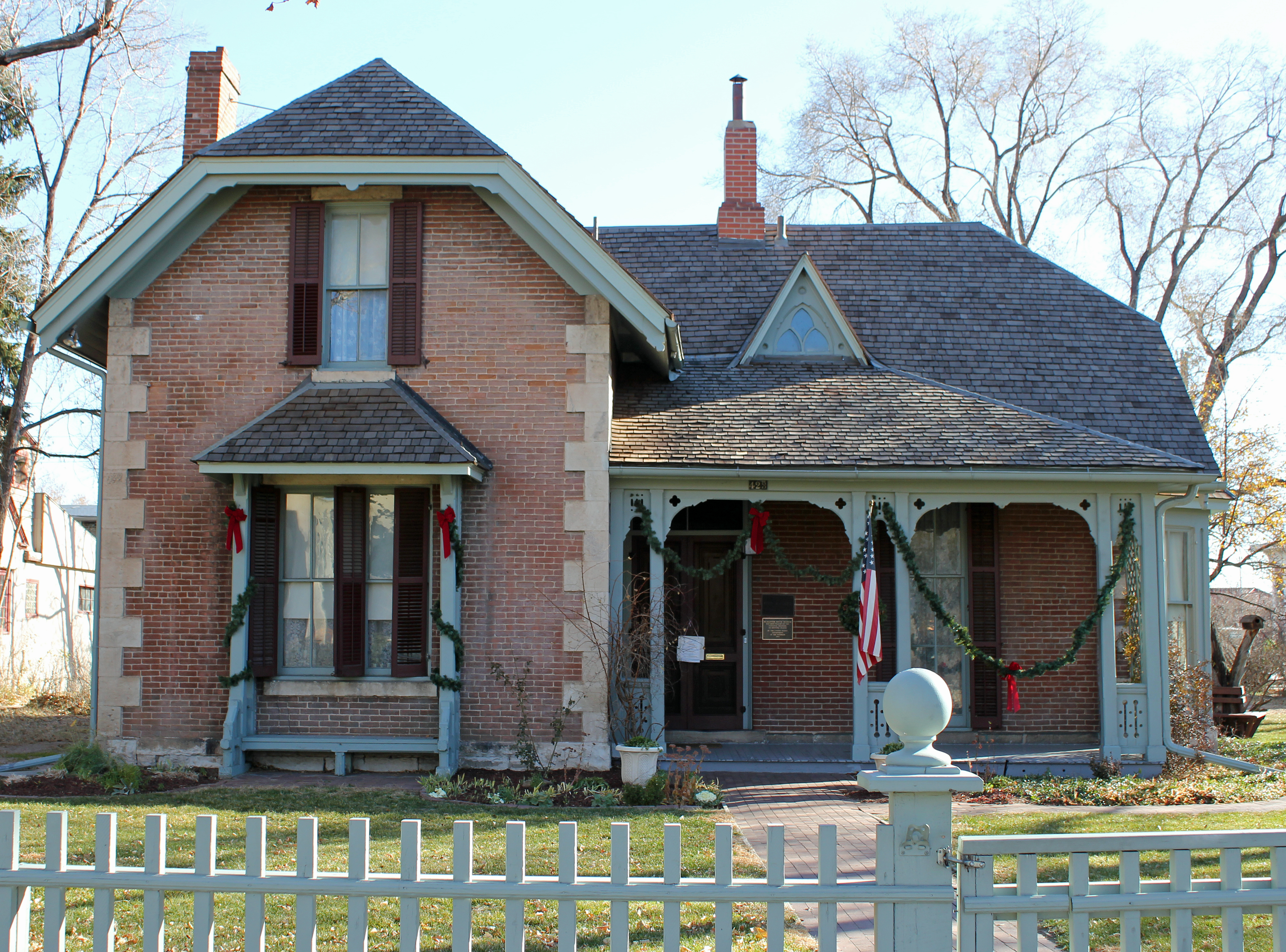
- Location: 423 N. Cascade Ave., Colorado Springs, Colorado
- Coordinates: 38°50′21″N 104°49′26″W
- Built: 1873
- Architect: George Summers
- Architectural style: English
- Website: McAllister House Museum
- NRHP reference No.: 73000472
- Added to NRHP: August 14, 1973

The McAllister House is a historic house located on 423 N. Cascade Ave. in Colorado Springs, Colorado. It was added to the National Register of Historic Places on August 14, 1973. It was owned by Henry McAllister and was opened as a public museum in 1961.
