= Mayan Theater (Denver) =

Art Deco Mayan Revival style arthouse theater in Denver

Mayan Theatre
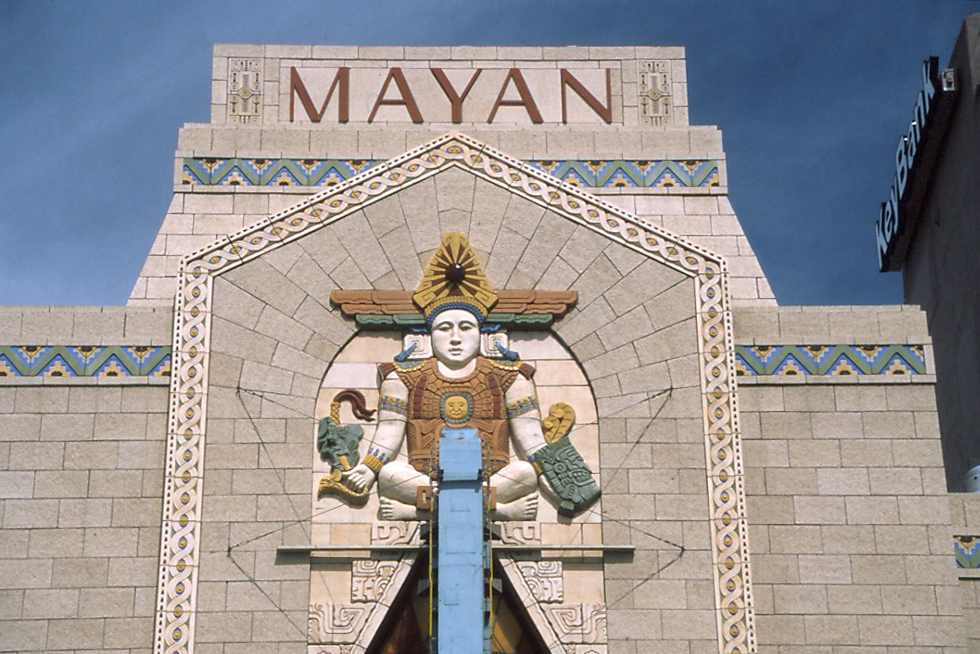
- The Mayan Theatre in Denver, Colorado, dates from the 1930s.
- Interactive map of Mayan Theatre
- Former names: Fox Mayan Theatre
- Address: 110 Broadway; Denver, CO; United States
- Coordinates: 39.71866°N 104.98721°W
- Owner: Peter Tyssen (from 1988)
- Operator: Landmark Theatres (1986–present)
- Capacity: 1,200 (original, 1930)
- Type: Cinema
- Screen: 3 (converted from single screen in 1986)
- Designation: Denver historic landmark (1984)

Construction
- Opened: November 20, 1930
- Renovated: 1986 ($2 million conversion to three-screen)
- Closed: 1984
- Reopened: November 6, 1986
- Architect: M. S. Fallis Architect Co.

Website
- www.landmarktheatres.com/denver/mayan-theatre

The Mayan Theater is a movie house that opened in Denver, Colorado in 1930 and was part of the Fox Theater Corporation and Fox Intermountain Theaters. Its life as a Fox Theater is denoted on top of its neon marquee. As with many theaters across the U.S., it ran a slate of A and B movies throughout the day. During the Great Depression, the theater held grocery nights when customers had the opportunity to win food.

The Mayan Theater was designed by Montana Fallis and opened in 1930 during a period when the construction of ornate movie palaces continued despite the Depression. The theater's interior features pre-Columbian forms and motifs throughout, though in a more restrained manner than its namesake, the Mayan Theater in Los Angeles. Both theaters incorporate the same "Mayan warrior" figure, but the Denver theater's ornament is more stylized and also incorporates Native American elements alongside the pre-Columbian designs. The corbel vault underneath the large figure on the front facade is decorative rather than structural, a characteristic transformation of indigenous architectural forms common in pre-Columbian Revival buildings.

The main architecture firm was M. S. Fallis Architect Co., with a neon sign on the facade designed by QRS Neon Corp. The theater was designed to accommodate 1200 patrons and the Bavarian artist Oswald Fell was hired to ensure that the theater's Mayan artwork was as authentic as possible.

To promote the theater's upcoming opening, the theater flew a skywriting plane over Denver, which wrote a secret message in the sky for the people of the city. Individuals who wrote down the sentence and mailed it to the Rocky Mountain News contest editor then had a chance to win free tickets to the theater's opening night gala.

The Mayan's opening night gala took place on November 20, 1930, with a dedication at 7 p.m. and a second show at 9:15 p.m. The feature picture was Monte Carlo, starring Jeanette MacDonald, with a Wurlitzer organ performance by Stanley Del Marr Wheeler and a musical performance by the Mayan Five.

In 1951, the theater installed a Glascreen screen, which was the first of its kind in the Rocky Mountain area.

The theater, located at 110 Broadway, closed in 1984. The theater's owner (Union Bank & Trust) obtained a permit from the city of Denver to demolish the theater, but faced opposition from Friends of the Mayan, a neighborhood group. An appeal was made to the Federal Deposit Insurance Corporation, which declined to intervene in the demolition. The theater was not demolished and instead underwent a $2 million renovation and conversion to a three-plex by dividing the balcony into two additional small theaters. The interior walls, decor and lobby all were restored. Landmark Theaters has operated the theater as an art house since it reopened.

Under Landmark, the Mayan operated as part of a three-venue art-house circuit with the Esquire Theatre on East Sixth Avenue and the Chez Artiste, together giving the chain eight screens in Denver and making the city one of Landmark's top markets nationally. In May 2005, the Mayan and the Esquire held a joint celebration of the Mayan's 75th anniversary, with Landmark city manager David Kimball calling it "a way for us to say thanks" to the community. The Esquire closed in July 2024; the Mayan remains in operation.

On November 6, 1986, the theater reopened, with a gala featuring Denver Mayor Federico Peña and The Friends of the Mayan, the neighborhood organization that advocated for its preservation and restoration. The four films showed at the opening included Down by Law, Three Men and a Cradle, Precious Images and "It Happened in Monte Carlo".

In 1988, the theater building was purchased by German investor Peter Tyssen.

The Mayan is one of the country's three remaining theaters designed in the Art Deco Mayan Revival style. The city of Denver has declared it to be a historic landmark.

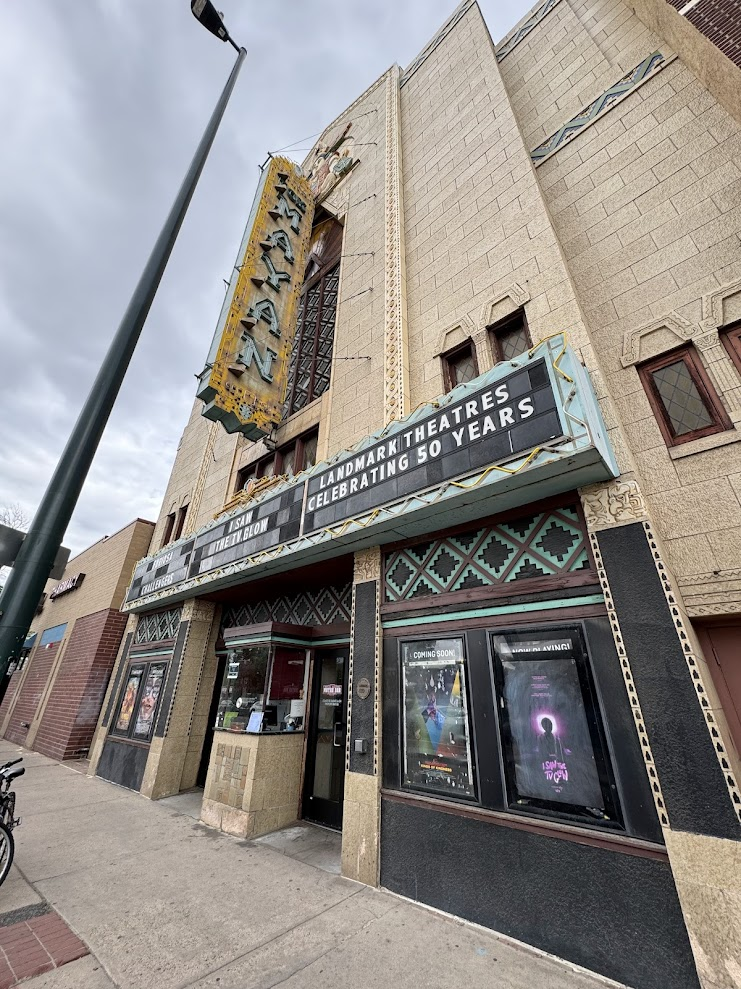
Exterior

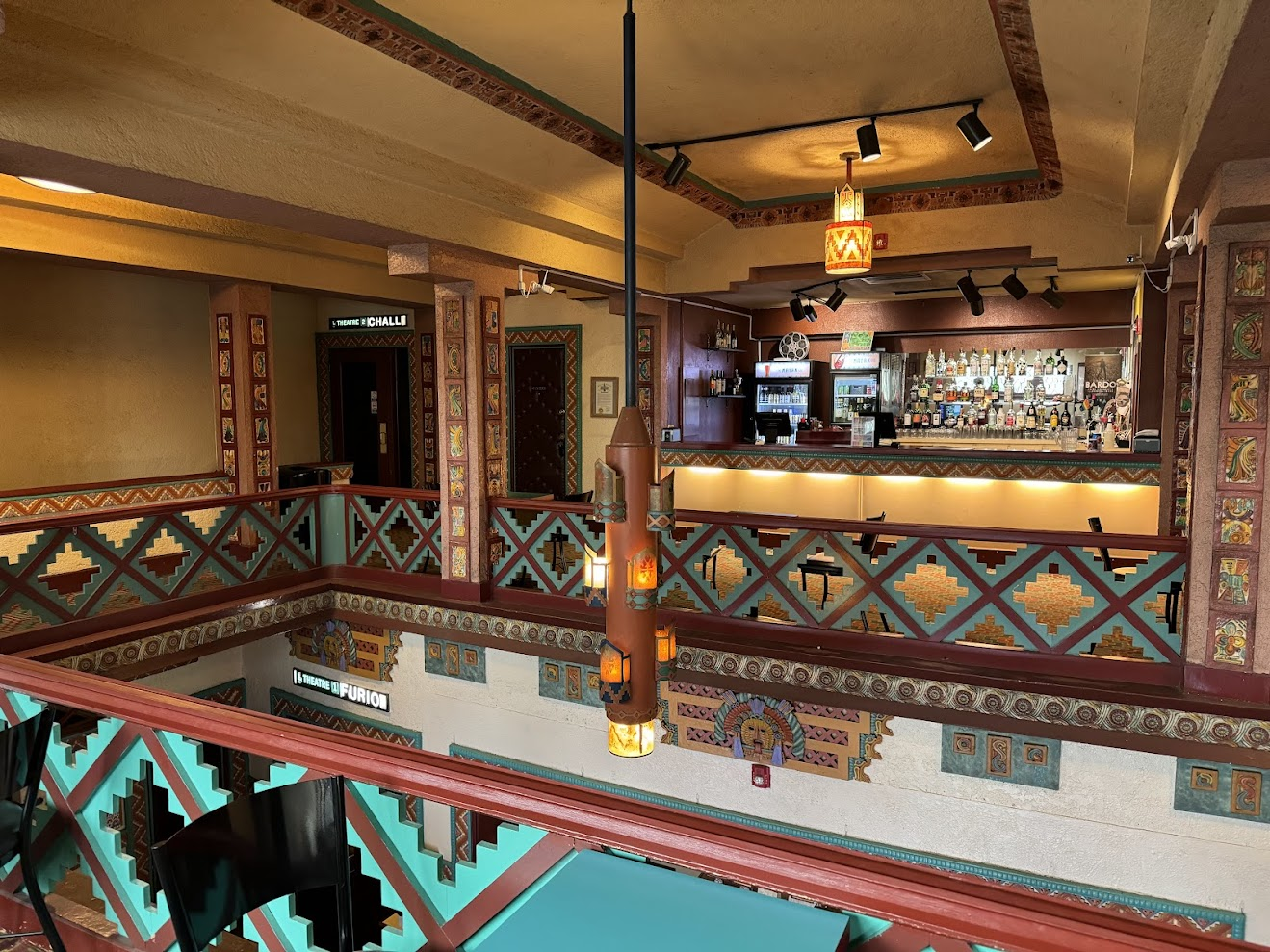
Upper Level

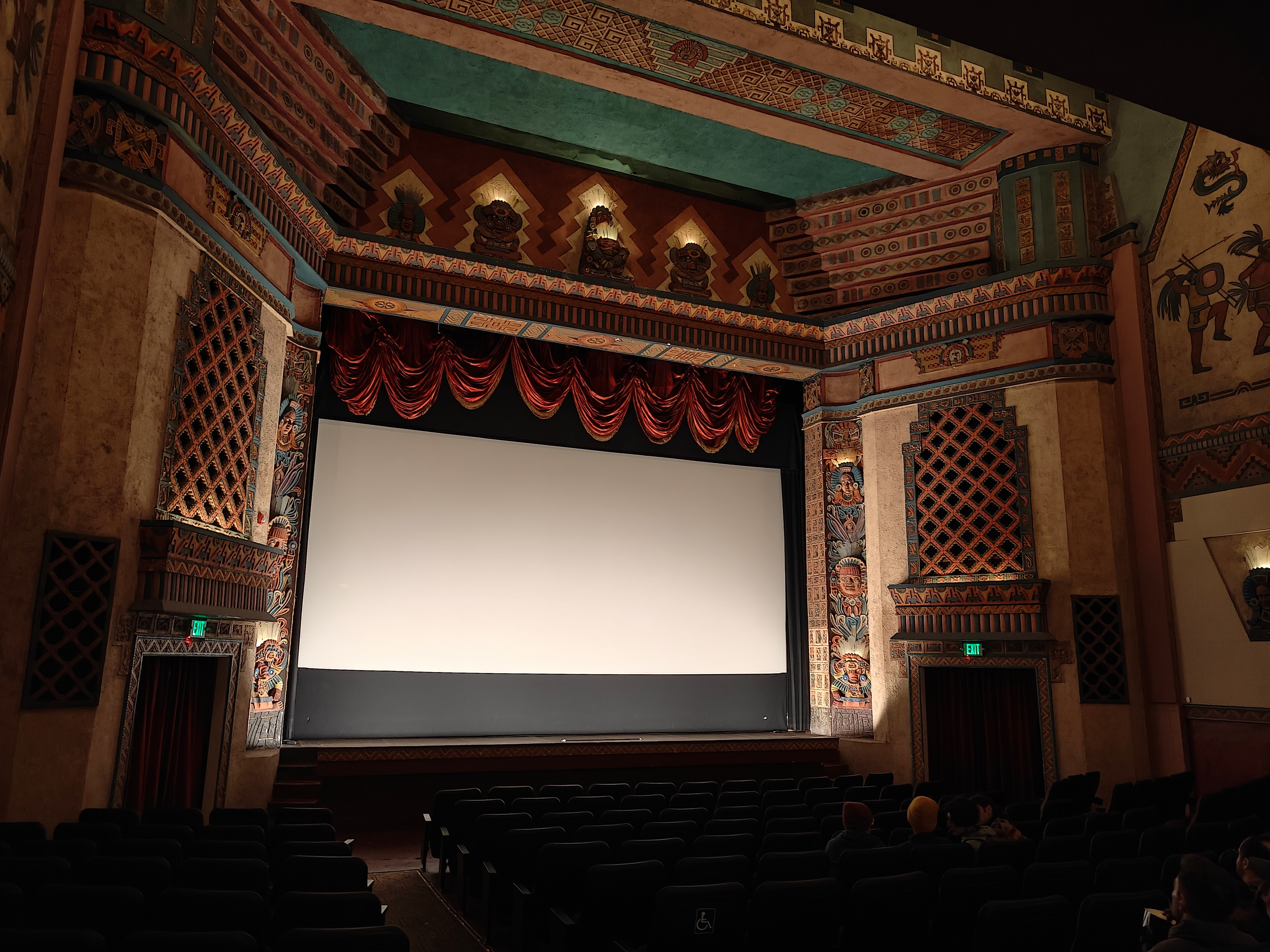
Main Theater
