= Out Front (newspaper) =

American LGBT newspaper

Out Front Magazine
- Editor: Addison Herron-Wheeler
- Frequency: Monthly
- Format: magazine and daily online publication
- Publisher: Maggie Phillips, Addison Herron-Wheeler
- First issue: April 2, 1976
- Based in: 3100 N Downing St. Denver, Colorado 80205; United States
- Language: English
- Website: outfrontmagazine.com

Out Front Magazine is an LGBTQ newspaper and daily online publication in the Denver metropolitan area, founded by Phil Price. Its first issue was dated April 2, 1976, and it is one of the oldest independent LGBTQ publications in the United States.

== History ==
On April 2, 1976, Phil Price, a student at the University of Colorado in Boulder, published the first edition of Out Front from his parents' basement.

Out Front provided coverage of the early spread of the HIV/AIDS epidemic. Price himself died from AIDS in 1993 at the age of 39. He left Out Front to Greg Montoya, Jay Klein, and Jack Kelley. Kelley later died of natural causes.

Montoya and Klein owned and managed Out Front until early 2012, when Colorado resident Jerry Cunningham bought the publication. On October 30, 2020, Jerry Cunningham stepped back to focus on the non-profit activities of the Out Front Foundation, as Maggie Phillips and Addison Herron-Wheeler became majority owners and co-publishers of the magazine.

The publication has had a web presence since at least 2006.

== Reception and controversy ==
The magazine is one of the oldest LGBTQ publications still in operation. It is sometimes referred to as "Denver's gay, lesbian, bisexual and transgender magazine", or "a directory and guide to the local gay scene".

In 2002, the magazine refused to published an advert submitted by the National Lawyer Guild's LGBT committee, prompting accusations that the magazine had "sold out".

In 2014, the magazine's publisher Q Publishing Group sued billboard advertising company Outfront Media, which had changed its name from CBS Outdoor to Outfront Media in 2014. The two parties settled out of court in 2016.

In 2021, the magazine was added to the Colorado Historic Newspapers Collection.

== Price and distribution ==
Out Front is maintained through advertisement sales and is a free publication, distributed throughout the Denver Metro area as well as other parts of Colorado. It has a main circulation of 10,000 copies distributed at more than 250 locations in the Denver metropolitan area. In 2015, The Denver Post reported that the magazine had a reach of 76,000 people.

It was originally published monthly, but soon switched to biweekly publication. In 2021, publication once again began monthly.
