= Emily Thompson =

American aural historian (born 1962)

- Born: 1962 (age 63–64)
- Education: Rochester Institute of Technology (BS); Princeton University (PhD)
- Awards: MacArthur Fellows Program
- Scientific career
- Fields: Aural historian
- Institutions: University of California, San Diego; Princeton University

Emily Ann Thompson (born 1962) is an American aural historian. She teaches at Princeton University.

She graduated from the Rochester Institute of Technology with a B.S. in Physics in 1984, and from Princeton University, with a Ph.D. in the history of science in 1992. She was Associate Professor of History at University of California, San Diego, from 2005 to 2006.

== Awards ==
- 2005 MacArthur Fellows Program
- 2005 Edelstein Prize sponsored by the Society for the History of Technology (SHOT)
- 2004 Marc-August Pictet Prize presented by The Societe de Physique et d'Histoire Naturelle (SPHN) de Geneve
- 2003 John Hope Franklin Book Award presented by the American Studies Association
- 2002 Science Writing Award in Acoustics for Journalists, presented by the Acoustical Society of America
- 2003 Lewis Mumford Award for Outstanding Scholarship in the Ecology of Technics

== Works ==
- The Soundscape of Modernity: Architectural Acoustics and the Culture of Listening in America, 1900-1933, MIT Press, 2002, ISBN 978-0-262-70106-8
- The Architecture of Science, Peter Galison, Emily Thompson (Eds.) MIT Press, 1999, ISBN 978-0-262-07190-1
