= Henry C. Brown =

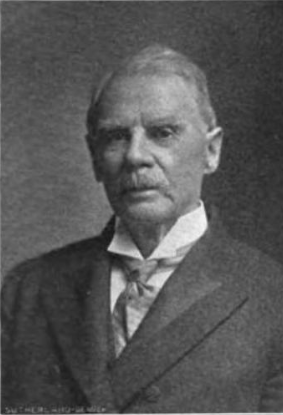
Henry C. Brown (1820–1906), builder of the Brown Palace Hotel in Denver

Henry C. Brown (November 12, 1820 – 1906) was a carpenter, architect, real estate developer and businessman during Denver's early days. After operating a boarding house and carpentry shop, both of which were washed away by the flood of 1864, he homesteaded 160 acres in Denver. He donated land for the state capitol in the middle of his land. He built the Brown Palace Hotel, a luxury hotel that has been visited by historical figures, including United States Presidents.

== Early life ==
Henry Cordes Brown was born on November 12, 1820, near St. Clairsville in Belmont County, Ohio. His parents were Polly Newkirk and Samuel Brown. It was Samuel's second marriage. Samuel was a 2nd lieutenant during the Revolutionary War and served at the Battle of Bunker Hill, at the Siege of Boston, at the Battle of Concord, and during Benedict Arnold's expedition to Quebec. Henry was one of the Sons of the American Revolution.

He was one of 19 siblings, of his father's two marriages. He and his sister Elizabeth were the youngest children. Like her brother, Elizabeth Brown Fennon was a pioneer of Colorado. His mother died when he was two years old. He studied primarily at local country schools and had a course at Franklin Brooks Academy in St. Clairsville. His father died when he was seven years old. Having become an orphan, he went to work at farms until he was 16 years of age. He then learned the trade of joiners and carpenters and then he left the area and found work at Wheeling, West Virginia.

== Family and early career ==
On January 14, 1841, Brown married his first wife, Anna Louise Inskeep, at St. Clairsville in Belmont County, Ohio. They had two children, Benjamin Franklin and Anna Mary Brown. (Note: Anna M. Brown, born May 3, 1842, was married to Hubert R. Green of Denver. Benjamin F. Brown was born in December 1843. In 1860, Ann and Benjamin Brown lived with their grandfather, John Enskeep, a farmer, in Stow, Summit County, Ohio. By 1870, Anna M. Green was married to Herbert R. Green, a merchant, and they lived in Denver. They lived near Henry C. Brown, Jane Brown, and their children, James and Caroline. Henry was identified as a real estate broker. In 1882, Henry's daughter and her husband, Herbert R. Green, lived at 135 Broadway. Henry lived nearby at 108 Broadway in Denver.) During their marriage, he traveled the western territory of what is now the United States and around South America looking for business investments. On one trip, he was in the west and South America for five years. During that trip, he walked most of the way to California with his ox team. After two months in San Francisco, he went to Washington Territory where he entered into several enterprises, including operating a saw mill and then a ranch. For three years, he worked in San Francisco in the building and contracting businesses. He traveled through South America, and he arrived in Virginia on a ship and returned to St. Louis on May 3, 1858. During the time that he was away, his wife had died on January 5, 1854. Their children were raised by his wife's parents. He left his children with their grandparents and headed to St. Louis, Missouri in 1844 and became an assistant to his brother Isaac Brown. He worked there until 1852 as a builder and architect. He tried a couple of endeavors in Sioux City, Iowa and Decatur, Nebraska.

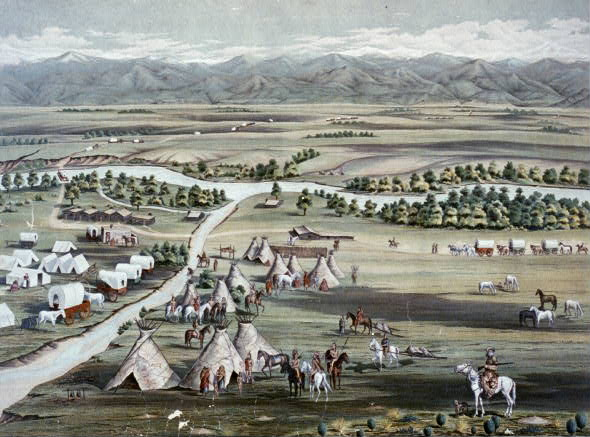
Painting of Denver in 1859 at the confluence of Cherry Creek and the South Platte River. It was common for Cheyenne and Arapaho to camp at the site on their way before or after hunting on the plains.

Brown married a Quaker schoolteacher, Jane Cary Thompson, on August 3, 1858, in Decatur, Nebraska. Henry and Jane went to St. Joseph, Missouri for a year and a half, during which they had a son, James Henry Brown, on September 3, 1859. They left from St. Louis to travel westward during the Pikes Peak Gold Rush. The intention was to settle in California, because Brown had real estate interests there and had investments in the lumber industry in the Pacific Northwest. They walked much of the 6-week-journey to Colorado, with their belongings loaded on a wagon. They arrived in Denver by March 1860 or on June 9, 1860. While sitting on a hill and looking at the Rocky Mountains, Jane decided that she would go no further, but he was free to continue the trek to California. Henry consented and they settled in Denver alongside Cherry Creek, near the confluence with the South Platte River. They had two more children, Carrie Marcia born on July 18, 1868, and Sherman Thompson on July 31, 1871. Jane became involved with the Methodist church and helped found the Denver Orphan's Home. Although Denver was a wild town, she and other woman were intent to make it a "kinder, gentler place". Jane died in 1893. They had been married about 30 years.

He married for a third time to Mary Helen Matthews. She was nineteen years old, and he was 74 years old. After six years of marriage, they were divorced. She married a man, John Douglas Campbell, who was nearer to her own age and she returned most of the expensive gifts that Brown had bought for her.

== Career ==
=== Early Denver days ===
Brown established a small boarding house and carpentry shop. In 1864, most of the settlement and both of his buildings were washed away. He had also built the first church in Denver, a Methodist church, and it was destroyed by the flood, too.

In 1863, he filed a claim for 160 acres, called Brown's Addition, and in 1864 he purchased the 160 acres on the southeastern portion of town on higher ground. Brown farmed part of the land and began laying lots and streets on his land. He built and sold property in Denver.

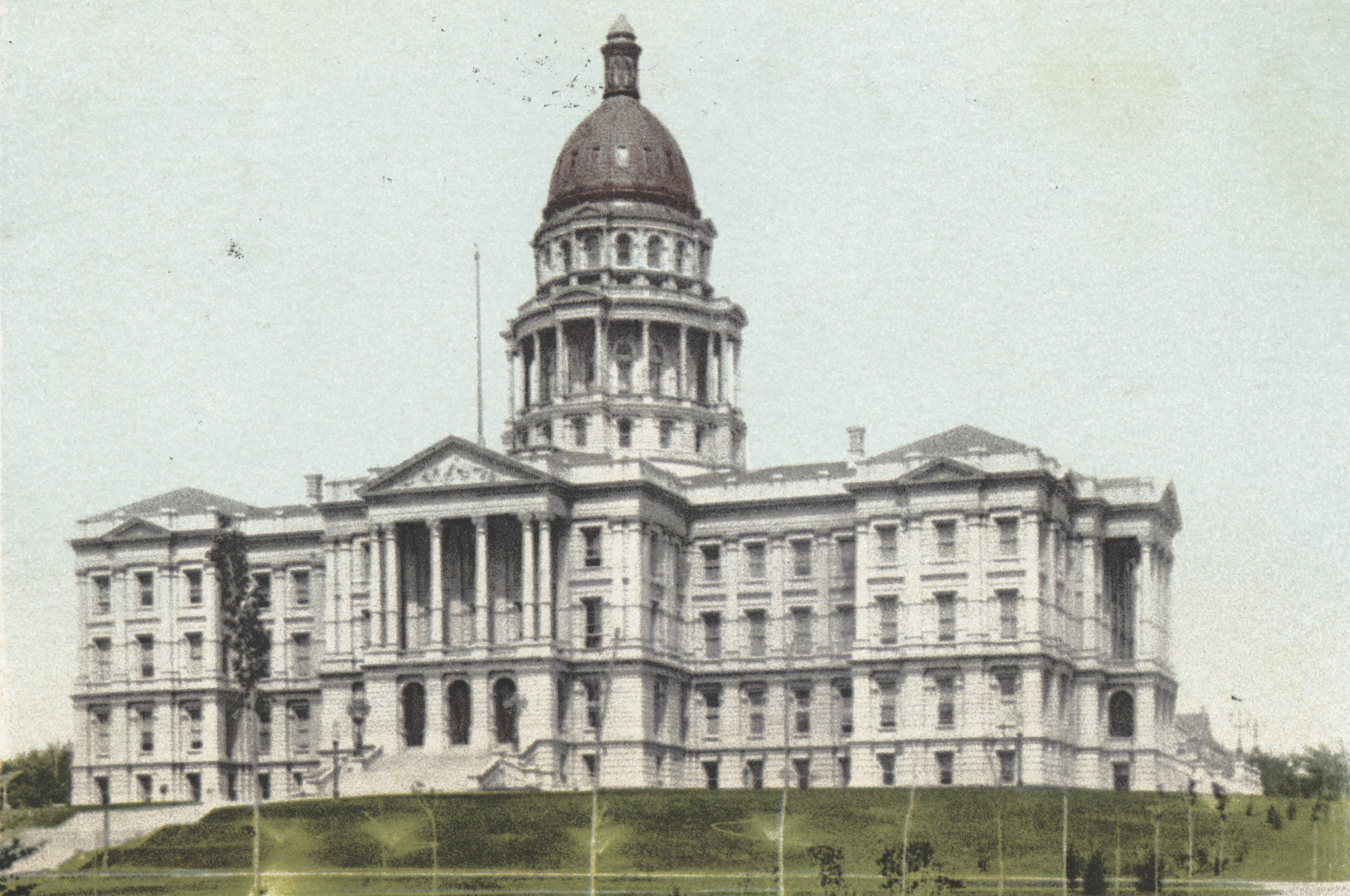
Colorado State Capitol, Denver Colorado, ca. 1901–1902

There was a struggle over which town would become the capital of the territory. In 1868, Brown donated 10 lots, for a total of 10 acres, for what would become Capitol Hill. The property was located on a hill and in the middle of his property.

=== Brown Palace Hotel ===
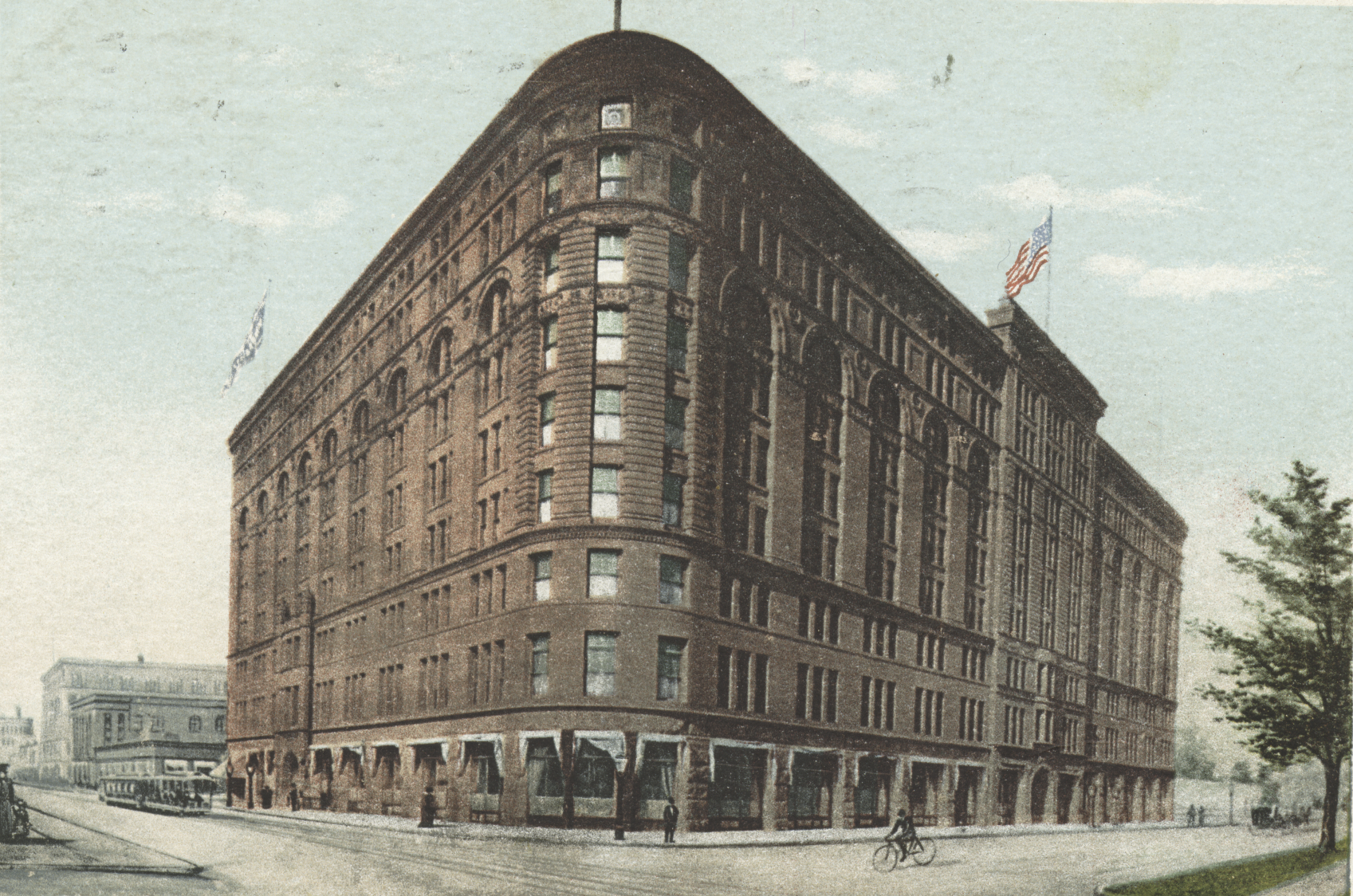
Brown Palace Hotel, ca. 1901, New York Public Library

He owned the land for what would become the site of the Brown Palace Hotel. It is a triangular lot between Broadway, Tremont Place and 17th Street. In 1888, excavation began for the hotel based upon a provisional contract for the land by William H. Bush and James Duff with Brown. Brown took over the operation when the men ran out of money. Bush and N.M. Tabor were co-partners with Brown, but Brown paid 75% of the $2 million that it cost to build and furnish the hotel. (Note: It is also said to have cost $1 million or $1.6 million to build.)

Brown hired architect Frank Edbrooke by 1890 to design the hotel, which had a triangular shape based upon the lot it sat on. (Note: The Oxford Hotel was designed by Edbrooke and located on 17th Street. The construction was completed in 1890.) Within the center of the hotel is a large atrium. It is of Richardsonian Romanesque-style architecture with a red sandstone exterior. At the time it was built, it was the tallest building in Denver. The 400-room hotel opened on August 12, 1892. It is an elegant building that had its own artesian well, a private electric plant, steam heat, and elevators when it opened. It was one of the first fire-proof buildings in the United States. It was built during the Wild West days to provide luxurious lodging and cuisine. Now a four-star and four-diamond hotel, it has been visited by historical figures, stars, and United States Presidents. Winfield Scott Stratton bought the hotel before Brown's death.

=== Denver Daily Tribune ===
In 1872, he purchased the Denver Daily Tribune and operated it until November 15, 1875. It was located on the corner of 16th and Holladay (now Market) Streets. He sold the business to Herman Beckurts. In 1884, it was merged with the Denver Republican.

== Death ==
Brown died on March 6, 1906, in San Diego, California. He was 86 years of age and was in California for a visit. He lay in state at the Denver State Capitol, during which there were 2,000 visitors. Jane and Henry Brown are buried at Fairmount Cemetery in Denver.
