= Brinker Collegiate Institute =

Historic school building in Denver, Colorado, United States

- U.S. National Register of Historic Places
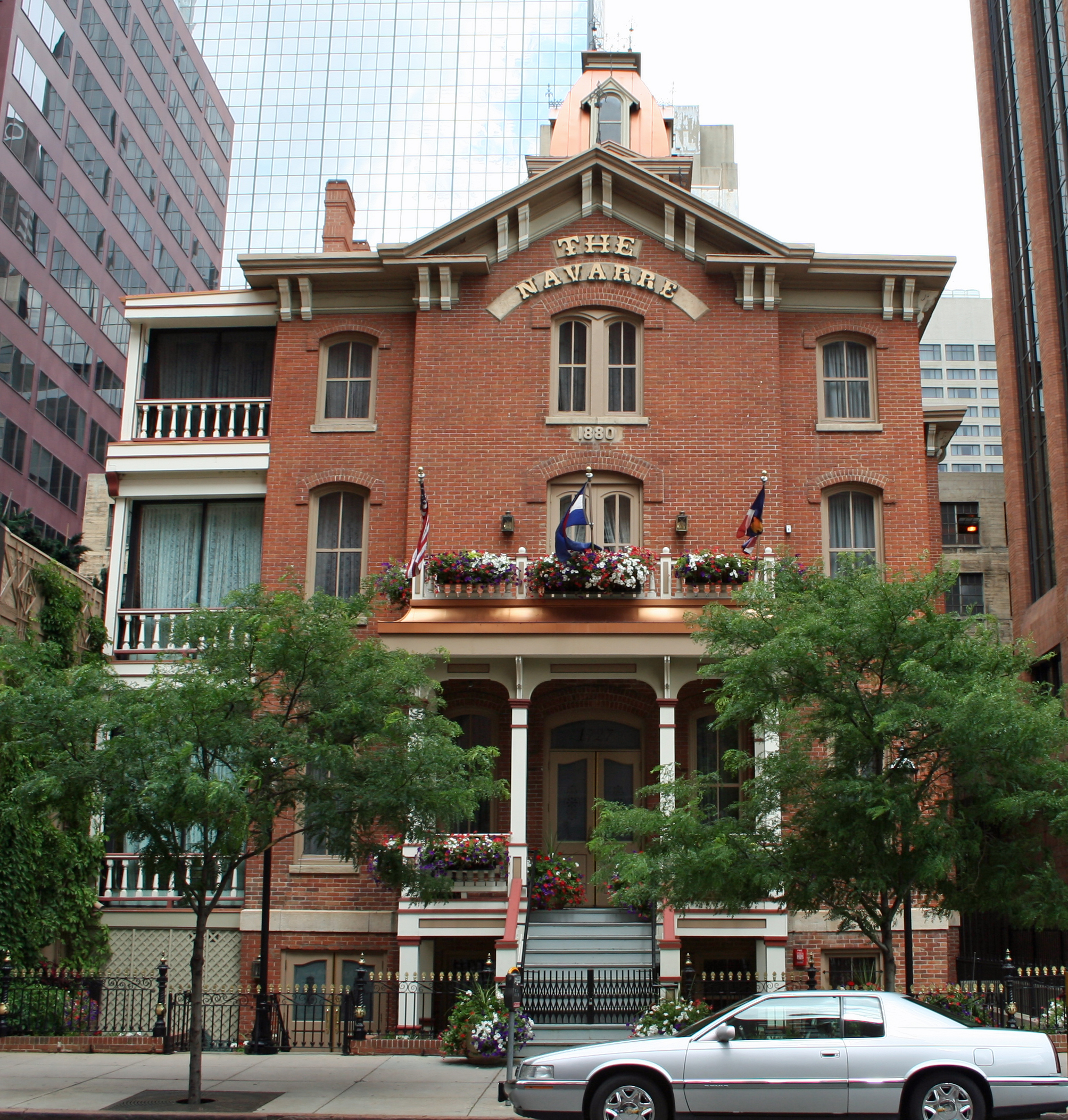
- The building in July 2009

- Location within Colorado Location within the United States
- Location: 1725-1727 Tremont Place; Denver, Colorado; United States
- Coordinates: 39.74471°N 104.98807°W
- Area: less than one acre
- Built: 1880
- Architectural style: Late Victorian
- NRHP reference No.: 77000365
- Added to NRHP: October 28, 1977

The Brinker Collegiate Institute is a historic school building in Denver, Colorado, United States, that is listed on the National Register of Historic Places (NRHP).

== Description ==
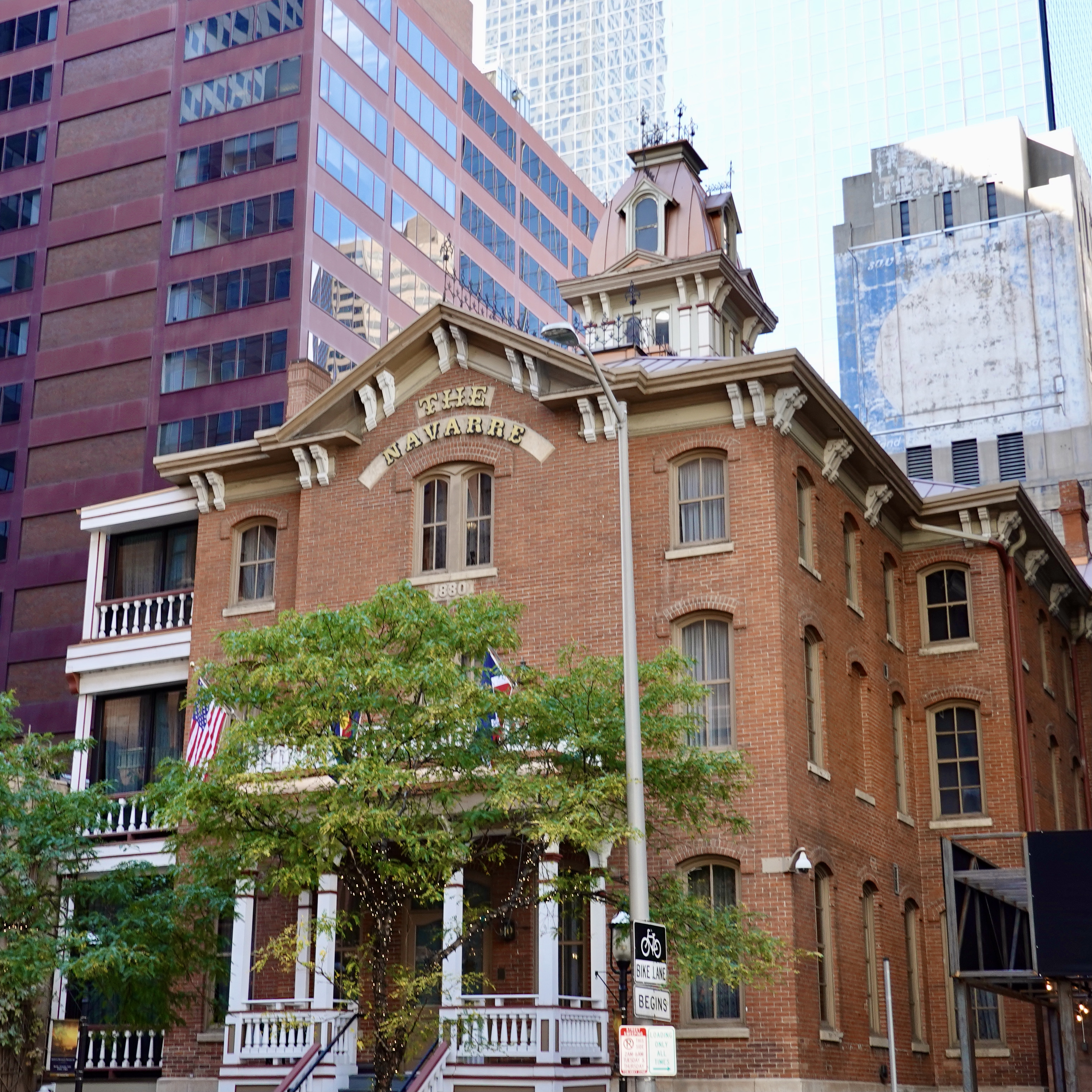
The Brinker Collegiate Institute, October 2021

The building is located at 1725-1727 Tremont Place within the Downtown Denver Historic District in the Central Business District of Denver and was a private school established in 1877. The structure was built in 1880 to serve as the permanent home of the school, and did so until 1889. From 1889 to 1904 it was modified and opened as a hotel, the Richelieu Hotel at first and then as The Navarre. After 1914 it served as a restaurant and a private club.

It is a four-story building, about 50 by 100 feet (15 m × 30 m) in plan, Late Victorian in style. The building's architect is unknown, although it was "planned" by Denver architect F.E. Edbrooke, who later designed the Brown Palace Hotel built in 1892, just across the street.

Its basement steam room was once connected by rail tunnel to the Brown Palace Hotel, which could deliver coal and allow hidden passage, although by 1976 the passageway had been sealed off.

The building was listed on the NRHP October 28, 1977 as "Brinker Collegiate Institute". And, as "Navarre Building", it was designated Denver Landmark #470 in 1971. It is also included in the Downtown Denver Historic District designated by the City of Denver in 2000.

== See also ==
- National Register of Historic Places listings in downtown Denver
