= Loretto Heights =

Loretto Heights may refer to:

- The heights of Notre Dame de Lorette in France
- Teikyo Loretto Heights University
