= Brown Palace Hotel (Denver) =

- U.S. National Register of Historic Places
- Colorado State Register of Historic Properties
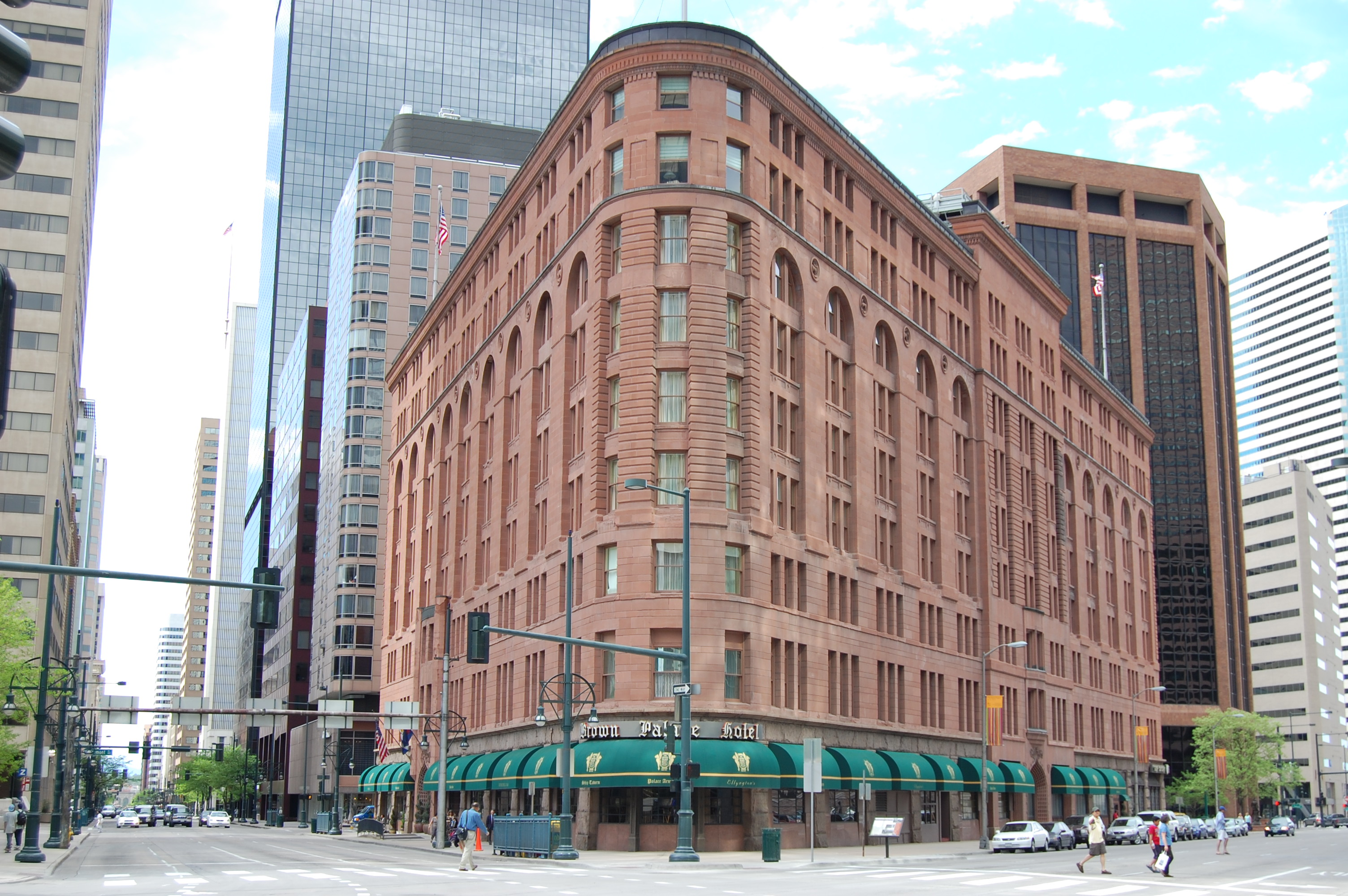
- The Brown Palace Hotel, with the 1959 annex tower visible behind it on the left

- Location within Colorado Location within the United States
- Location: 17th St. and Tremont Pl., Denver, Colorado
- Coordinates: 39°44′39″N 104°59′14″W
- Area: 9.5 acres (3.8 ha)
- Built: 1892
- Built by: Giddes & Seerie
- Architect: Frank Edbrooke
- Architectural style: Italian Renaissance Revival
- NRHP reference No.: 70000157
- CSRHP No.: 5DV.110
- Added to NRHP: April 28, 1970

The Brown Palace Hotel, now The Brown Palace Hotel and Spa, Autograph Collection, is a historic hotel in Denver, Colorado, United States. It is listed on the National Register of Historic Places and is the second-longest operating hotel in Denver. It is one of the first atrium-style hotels ever built. It is now operated by Highgate Hotels and Resorts, and joined Marriott's Autograph Collection Hotels in 2012. The hotel is located at 321 17th Street between 17th Street, Broadway and Tremont Place in downtown Denver behind the Republic Plaza. The main entrance door is on Tremont Place. The Brown Palace Hotel, now The Brown Palace Hotel and Spa, Autograph Collection is member of Historic Hotels of America, an official program of the National Trust for Historic Preservation, since 2023.

== History ==
The hotel was built in 1892 of sandstone and red granite, one year later than the Oxford Hotel. It was named for its original owner, Henry C. Brown, who had homesteaded the Capitol Hill area, and was designed with its distinctive triangular shape by architect Frank Edbrooke, who also designed the Oxford Hotel. The interior and the exterior of the building are considered to be the "finest extant example" of Edbrooke's work.

Built with an iron and steel frame covered with cement and sandstone by the Whitehouse & Wirgler Stone Company, the building was "one of America's first fireproof structures, according to a May 21, 1892 cover story in Scientific American." Upon its completion it was Denver's tallest building.

In the early 1930s Colorado muralist Allen Tupper True began discussing the possibility of creating two murals for the hotel with then owner Denver financier Charles Boettcher and after some delay the two works, Stage Coach and Airplane Travel were unveiled in the hotel's lobby in 1937.

In 1935, as a celebration of the Repeal of Prohibition in the United States, Denver architect Alan Fisher designed "Ship Tavern"; one of four restaurants inside The Brown Palace.

== Annex ==
The 22-story, 231-room tower directly across Tremont Place was built as a new wing of the hotel in 1959, known as the Brown Palace West. For many years it operated as a budget wing of the hotel, until the Brown Palace's owners branded the guest rooms in the annex as a Comfort Inn in 1988, and then as a Holiday Inn Express in December 2014. The lower levels of the tower are shared with the Brown Palace, including the Grand Ballroom and executive offices. The tower is connected to the main building by a skybridge over Tremont Place and a service tunnel running under the street.

== The Western White House ==
Teddy Roosevelt, who previously dined at the Brown Palace as governor of New York in 1900, became the first sitting American president to visit the hotel on May 8, 1905. The occasion was marked by a banquet during which more than five hundred quarts of champaign and 1,500 cigars were consumed. Roosevelt himself is reported to have led other guests in a boisterous rendition of “There’ll Be a Hot Time in the Old Town Tonight.” Since then, nearly every American president has visited the hotel.

Dwight D. Eisenhower frequented the Brown Palace throughout his life and used the hotel's second floor as headquarters during his 1952 presidential campaign. During his presidency, Eisenhower spent enough time at the Brown Palace for it to acquire the moniker ‘The Western White House.’

When the 23rd G8 Summit was held in Denver in June 1997, the Brown Palace hosted the U.S. delegation's main headquarters and was referred to as ‘White House, Denver.’ The hotel’s Gold Room served as a temporary Oval Office for President Bill Clinton, while the Onyx Room became a venue for meetings with Russian President Boris Yeltsin, French President Jacques Chirac, and Italian Prime Minister Romano Prodi. However, the nearby Denver Central Library served as the summit's primary meeting space.

The Brown Palace was also a headquarters and important meeting place for delegates and presidential hopefuls when the city played host to the 1908 and 2008 Democratic National Conventions.

== Murders of 1911 ==
The hotel was the site of the high-profile 1911 murders in which Frank Henwood shot and killed Sylvester Louis "Tony" von Phul, and accidentally killed an innocent bystander, George Copeland, in the hotel's "Marble Bar." Henwood and von Phul were rivals for (or shared) the affections of Denver socialite Isabel Springer, the wife of wealthy Denver businessman and political candidate John W. Springer. The murders culminated in a series of very public trials.

== Birthplace of the Denver Broncos ==
In 1959, professional sports entrepreneurs Lamar Hunt and Bob Howsam met in the hotel lobby to discuss the formation of a new professional football league, the AFL. At the meeting, Howsam agreed to own one of the founding franchises, later named the Denver Broncos. A placard in the lobby marks the event.

== Popular culture ==
In Joan Didion's 1977 novel A Book of Common Prayer, the narrator, Grace Strasser-Mendana, lives at the Brown Palace after her parents' deaths.

The hotel features in the 2017 Jane Fonda and Robert Redford film Our Souls at Night.

It features in the time travel novel “Warm Souls” - Part 2 of the “Wealth of Time” series by Andre Gonzalez. The Brown Palace is featured on many of Denver's cultural tours.

== Notable guests and visitors ==
- Governor Billy Adams, who took the oath of office at the hotel in 1929
- Rock band Aerosmith
- Vice President Spiro Agnew
- Quarterback and sportscaster Troy Aikman
- Emperor Akihito and Empress Michiko of Japan, who were received by more than 400 guests at a reception in their honor at the hotel
- Secretary of State Madeleine Albright
- Actress June Allyson
- Hawaiian aristocrat and noted conman Prince Sammy Amalu, who was sued by the hotel after failing to pay for his wedding reception - which he missed on the account of a faked kidnapping - and was subsequently convicted of check fraud. He first met his wife in the hotel elevator.
- Actor John Amos
- British Prime Minister Clement Attlee
- Actor and singer Gene Autry
- Political strategist David Axelrod
- Governor Tim Babcock
- Composer and songwriter Burt Bacharach
- British military commander and founder of the scouting movement Lieutenant-General Lord Robert Baden-Powell
- Singer Antonella Barba
- Vice President Alben W. Barkley
- Professional basketball player, coach, and executive Elgin Baylor
- British rock band The Beatles
- Actor and filmmaker Warren Beatty
- Professional basketball player Zelmo Beaty
- Actor and environmentalist Ed Begley Jr.
- Actress Annette Bening
- National Security Advisor Sandy Berger
- Ottoman diplomat Djelal Munif Bey, who hosted a Central Powers luncheon at the hotel with his German and Austro-Hungarian counterparts in 1915. The meeting was notably staffed by one of the hotel's French waiters.
- Professional basketball player, businessman, and politician Mayor Dave Bing
- Fashion designer Bill Blass
- White House Chief of Staff Erskine Bowles
- Actor Beau Bridges
- Suffragette and peace activist Fanny Fligelman Brin
- The "Unsinkable" Molly Brown, who stayed at the hotel only a week after surviving the RMS Titanic disaster. She told reporters, "The Titanic disaster was as unnecessary as running the Brown Palace Hotel into Pikes Peak"
- Sports commentator Joe Buck
- First Lady Barbara Bush
- President George H.W. Bush
- President George W. Bush
- Secretary of Agriculture Earl Butz, who was forced from a hotel press conference by protesters in 1976
- Italian diplomat Prince Gelasio Caetani
- Author and historian Princess Julia Grant Cantacuzène, Countess of Speransky
- Singer-songwriter, record producer, and actress Mariah Carey
- Political commentator Tucker Carlson
- Scottish-American industrialist and philanthropist Andrew Carnegie
- Astronaut and deep-sea aquanaut Commander Scott Carpenter, USN
- President Jimmy Carter
- Civil rights activist and jurist Judge Robert L. Carter, who officiated a wedding at the hotel.
- Secretary of the Interior Oscar L. Chapman
- Actor and comedian Chevy Chase
- Chef Julia Child
- French President Jacques Chirac
- Russian-Israeli politician and economist Anatoly Chubais
- Actress and model Candy Clark
- Pianist Van Cliburn
- President Bill Clinton
- Author Chelsea Clinton
- First Lady and Secretary of State Hillary Clinton
- Singer and actress Rosemary Clooney
- Professional baseball player and manager Andy Cohen, who recuperated at the hotel after collapsing during a victory banquet.
- Professional football player and sportscaster Cris Collinsworth
- Actor Tim Conway
- Composer and conductor Aaron Copland
- Filmmaker Francis Ford Coppola
- Senator Edward P. Costigan
- Actor and filmmaker Kevin Costner
- Astronaut, author, and businessman Colonel Walter Cunningham, USMCR
- Actress Bette Davis
- Singer and performer Sammy Davis Jr.
- Israeli military leader and politician Moshe Dayan
- The Crown Prince and Princess of Denmark, the future King Frederik IX and Queen Ingrid
- British heavy metal band Deep Purple
- American politician Governor Thomas E. Dewey
- General Jimmy Doolittle, USAF
- Cardinal Dennis Joseph Dougherty
- Actor Keir Dullea
- Actress Faye Dunaway
- Comedian Jimmy Durante
- Actor Clint Eastwood
- Israeli politician and diplomat Abba Ebon
- Inventor and businessman Thomas Edison and his wife, community activist Mina Edison
- President Dwight D. Eisenhower and First Lady Mamie Eisenhower
- Professional basketball player and sports commentator LaPhonso Ellis, who signed his first NBA contract in a guest room at the hotel.
- Senator and Secretary of the Interior Albert B. Fall
- Cardinal John Murphy Farley
- Conductor Arthur Fiedler
- Industrialist Henry Ford
- Actor Harrison Ford
- President Gerald Ford
- Actor and producer John Forsythe
- Hungarian-American actress Zsa Zsa Gabor
- Professional baseball player Lou Gehrig
- British pop group The Spice Girls. British tabloid The Sun reported Posh Spice, Victoria Beckham, was turned away from the hotel restaurant because her "$1,200 Gucci miniskirt" was "too revealing." Hotel staff refute the story, claiming some of the group's male backup singers were turned away but none of The Spice Girls. Accounts differ on whether the event took place at the hotel's Palace Arms or Ellyngton's restaurant.
- Actress Lillian Gish
- Chief engineer of the Panama Canal George Washington Goethals
- NASA Administrator Daniel Goldin
- American politician Senator Barry Goldwater
- Professional basketball player Rickey Green
- Professional basketball player Hal Greer
- Austro-Hungarian Archduke Otto von Habsburg
- Actor Anthony Michael Hall
- Fashion designer Halston
- Actor George Hamilton
- Lord Lieutenant of Ireland and former Governor General of Canada John Hamilton-Gordon, 1st Marquess of Aberdeen and Temair and his wife, social activist, writer, and philanthropist Ishbel Hamilton-Gordon, Marchioness of Aberdeen and Temair
- President Warren G. Harding and First Lady Florence Harding
- Suffragette, social activist, and American diplomat Florence Jaffray Harriman
- President Benjamin Harrison
- American politician Governor Mark Hatfield
- Professional basketball player Connie Hawkins
- Actress Helen Hayes
- Cardinal Patrick Joseph Hayes
- Professional basketball player Tom Heinsohn
- Actress Katherine Hepburn
- Chief Rabbi Yitzhak HaLevi Herzog
- Denver socialite Louise Sneed Hill
- Hotel magnate Conrad Hilton
- Conductor Irwin Hoffman
- President Herbert Hoover
- Entertainer Bob Hope
- British diplomat and politician Baroness Florence Horsbrugh, GBE PC
- Professional basketball player Lou Hudson
- Greek-American author and businesswoman Arianna Huffington
- American statesman and jurist Charles Evans Hughes
- Vice President Hubert Humphrey
- King Hussein of Jordan
- Astronaut Colonel James Irwin, USAF
- Civil rights leader the Reverend Jesse Jackson
- British musician Mick Jagger
- British politician Lord Patrick Jenkin
- Performer and producer George Jessel
- Singer and songwriter Jewel
- First Lady Claudia "Lady Bird" Johnson
- President Lyndon B. Johnson
- Civil rights activist and businessman Vernon Jordan
- Musician Jon Bon Jovi
- Professional basketball player Sam Jones
- Activist, author and lecturer Helen Keller
- Activist Ethel Kennedy
- President John F. Kennedy
- Professional basketball player, coach, and broadcaster Johnny Kerr
- Secretary of State John Kerry and his wife, Portuguese-American businesswoman Teresa Heinz
- Professional basketball coach Frank Layden
- Filmmaker and actor Spike Lee
- Comedian and activist Jerry Lewis
- Aviator Charles Lindbergh
- Canadian-American radio and television personality Art Linkletter
- Ku Klux Klan Grand Dragon John Galen Locke, who died there in 1935
- Naval submariner Vice Admiral Charles A. Lockwood, USN
- Governor Earl K. Long
- Hungarian-American actor Peter Lorre
- Apollo 13 astronaut Captain Jim Lovell, USN
- Filmmaker Anthony Mann
- Professional basketball player Pete Maravich
- Mexican conductor and composer Eduardo Mata
- American politician Senator John McCain
- Military commander, diplomat, and territorial governor of Colorado Edward M. McCook
- Actor Darren McGavin
- Professional basketball player and coach Dick McGuire
- OSS veteran and jurist Chief Justice Robert Hugh McWilliams Jr.
- Singer and actress Ethel Merman
- Professional basketball player George Mikan
- Rodeo performer and stuntman Montie Montana, who rode his horse up the grand staircase
- American politician Senator Thruston Morton
- Jordanian Crown Prince Muhammad bin Talal, who recuperated at the hotel after collapsing during a reception at the Rocky Mountain Arsenal's officers' club.
- Actor and comedian Bill Murray
- Astronaut Dr. Story Musgrave
- Actor and comedian Bob Newhart
- First Lady Pat Nixon
- President Richard Nixon
- Social worker, political activist, and Pakistani nationalist Begum Viqar-un-Nisa Noon
- Queen Noor of Jordan
- The Crown Prince of Norway, the future King Olav V, and his wife Princess Märtha of Sweden
- Professional basketball player and sports commentator Shaquille O'Neal
- Theoretical physicist and "father of the atomic bomb" Dr. J. Robert Oppenheimer
- British diplomat Lord David Ormsby-Gore, 5th Baron Harlech, KCMG PC DL
- Music executive May Pang
- German diplomat, spymaster, and future chancellor Franz von Papen, who would later be tried at Nuremberg. His 1915 visit was facilitated by a former Austro-Hungarian military officer working at the hotel. His time at the Brown Palace coincided with a diplomatic crisis during which he was accused of masterminding acts of sabotage across the United States and Canada. He was declared persona non grata and expelled from the United States shortly after his stay.
- Singer-songwriter, actress, and philanthropist Dolly Parton
- General George S. Patton, USA
- House Speaker Nancy Pelosi
- Denver Mayor and Secretary of Transportation Federico Peña
- Polish composer and conductor Krzysztof Penderecki
- Actor and filmmaker Sean Penn
- Professional basketball player Bob Pettit
- Canadian-American actor Walter Pidgeon
- Secretary of Housing and Urban Development Samuel Pierce
- Political strategist David Plouffe
- Austrian-American director Otto Preminger
- Musician, actor, and filmmaker Prince
- Actor Vincent Price
- Italian Prime Minister Romano Prodi
- Hindu philosopher and President of India Sarvepalli Radhakrishnan
- President Ronald Reagan
- British musician Keith Richards
- Professional basketball player Oscar Robertson
- Vice President Nelson Rockefeller
- Actor and musician Charles "Buddy" Rogers
- Actress and singer Ginger Rogers
- Baseball entrepreneur and cofounder of the Philadelphia Phillies John Rogers, who died of heart failure in the hotel in 1910.
- Actor and singer Roy Rogers
- Queen Marie of Romania
- Businessman and American politician George W. Romney
- American politician Senator Mitt Romney
- First Lady Eleanor Roosevelt, who was spontaneously gifted a cowboy hat while dining with her grandchildren at the hotel.
- President Franklin Delano Roosevelt, who gave a speech from the atrium's second-floor balcony during his 1932 presidential campaign.
- President Theodore Roosevelt
- College football star and film producer Aaron Rosenberg
- American stateswoman Governor Nellie Tayloe Ross
- Aristocrat, Grand Pix racer, director, winegrower, and "French playboy" the Baron Philippe de Rothschild, who hosted a wine tasting at the hotel with Princess Gabrielle de Lichtenstein in 1950.
- Princess Anne, the Princess Royal
- Secretary of the Treasury Robert Rubin
- Actress, model, and singer Jane Russell
- Professional baseball legend Babe Ruth
- Cardinal Francesco Satolli
- Professional basketball player Dolph Schayes
- Astronaut Captain Wally Schirra, USN
- Senator Hugh Scott
- Senator Nathan B. Scott
- Chinese revolutionary and statesman Dr. Sun Yat-Sen, who was staying in room 321 when he learned of the Wuchang Uprising. He immediately left for Shanghai via Europe, led the 1911 Revolution, and became the first president of the new Republic of China - ending over 2,000 years of imperial rule.
- Musician Doc Severinsen
- Indian sitarist and composer Ravi Shankar
- Comedic singer Dorothy Shay, who performed in the hotel's Emerald Room restaurant
- Comedian Red Skelton
- Accomplished naval commander Rear Admiral Joseph S. Skerrett, USN
- Infamous Denver crime boss Jefferson "Soapy" Smith
- Governor Robert E. Smylie
- Prince Svasti Sobhana, the Prince Svastivatana Visishtha
- Actor E.H. Sothern, who recuperated at the hotel after falling ill during a performance at the Denham Theatre.
- Singer and songwriter Bruce Springsteen
- Actor and television host Robert Stack
- British musician and songwriter Cat Stevens
- Actor James Stewart and his wife Gloria Stewart
- British rock band The Rolling Stones
- Automobile pioneers Clement Studebaker and John Studebaker
- Economist and Secretary of the Treasury Larry Summers
- Singer and songwriter Taylor Swift
- Apollo 13 astronaut and American politician Jack Swigert
- President William Taft
- Japanese academic and politician Takekoshi Yosaburō
- American diplomat Strobe Talbott
- British-American actress Dame Elizabeth "Liz" Taylor, DBE
- Actor and singer Robert Taylor
- Prince Nicholas Tchkotoua
- Performer Shirley Temple
- Entertainer Danny Thomas
- Actress and philanthropist Marlo Thomas
- Nobel Peace Prize laureate and Northern Irish politician Lord David Trimble, PC
- Singer, actress, radio and TV personality, writer, and socialite Margaret Truman
- President Harry S. Truman
- Actress Kathleen Turner
- Professional basketball player and coach Wes Unseld
- Journalist Cornelius Vanderbilt IV
- Banker and journalist Frank A. Vanderlip
- Dutch Prime Minister Dries van Agt
- Senator John Warner
- Actor John Wayne
- Accordionist and TV personality Lawrence Welk
- Prince Wilhelm of Sweden, Duke of Södermanland (anglicized Prince William of Sweden)
- British politician and prominent socialist Ellen Wilkinson
- Actor and comedian Robin Williams
- Musician, composer, and conductor Meredith Willson
- President Woodrow Wilson and First Lady Edith Wilson
- British statesman and diplomat Edward Wood, 1st Earl of Halifax
- Architect Frank Lloyd Wright who, looking from the window of the Presidential Suite, remarked Denver was so ugly "one of Harry Truman's atom things [should] be dropped on it."
- Russian President Boris Yeltsin
- Real Estate mogul William Zeckendorf

== Gallery ==
Brown Palace Hotel

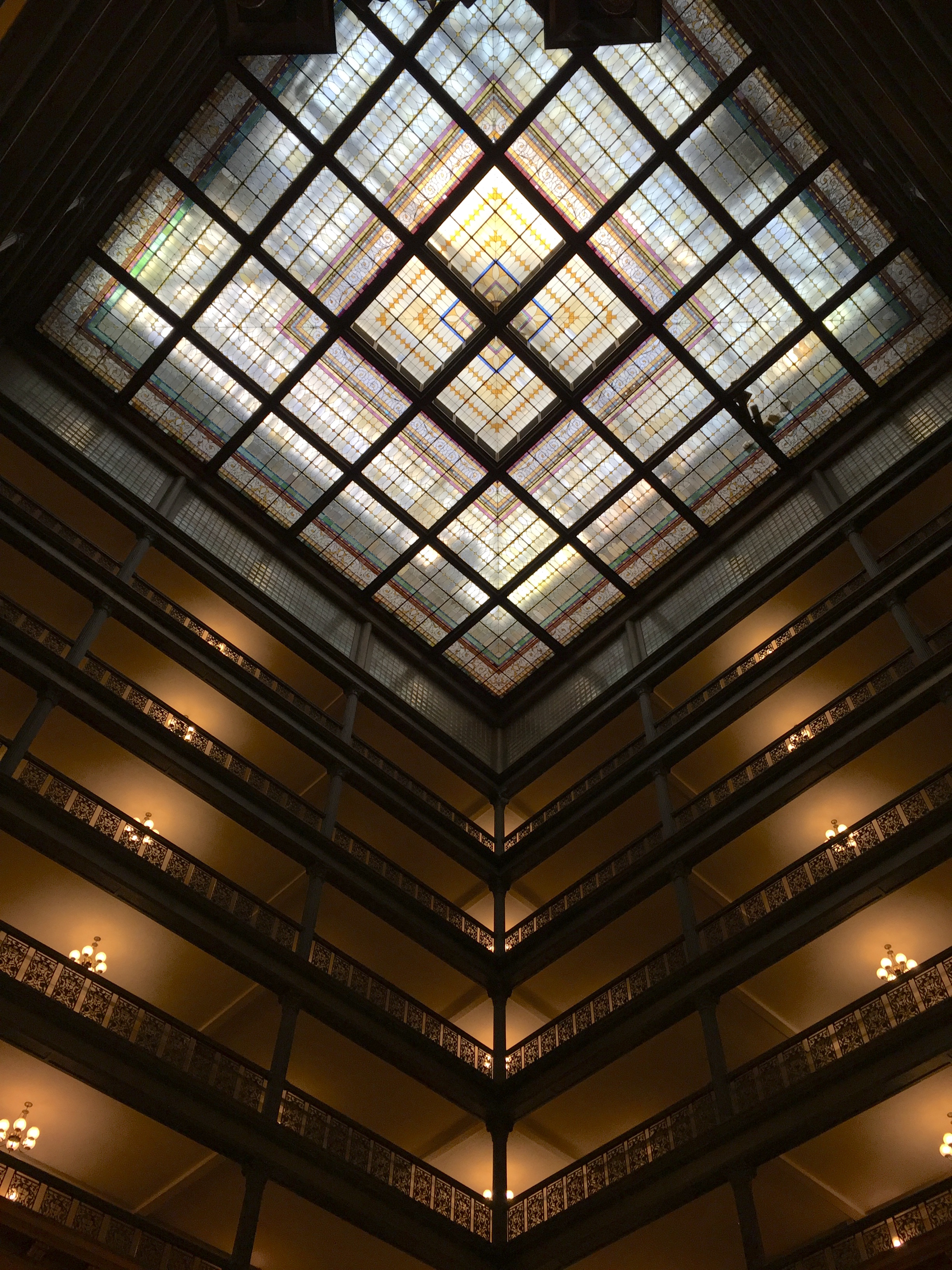
The Brown Palace atrium stained glass ceiling

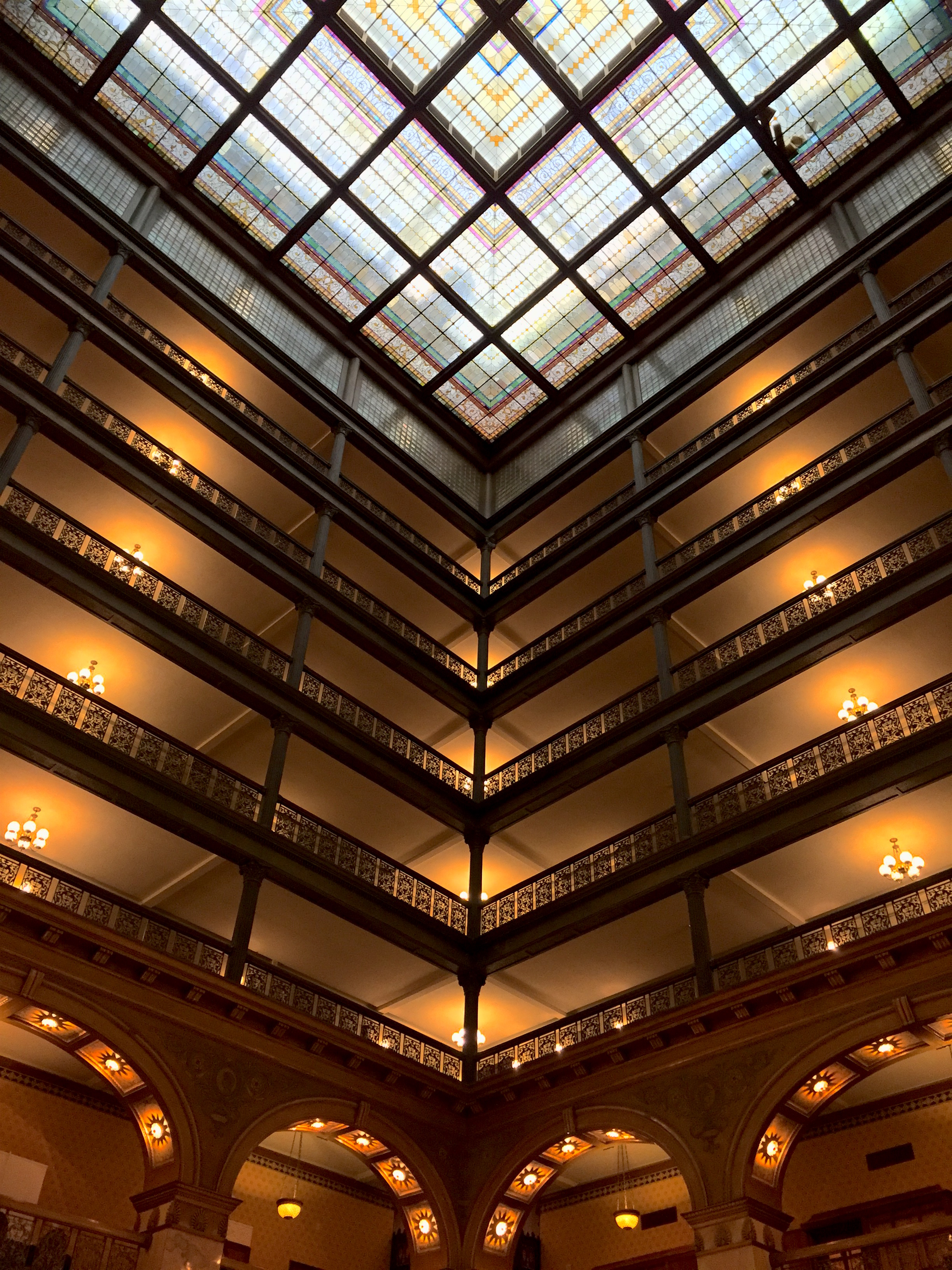
Historic balconies and interior architecture in atrium of The Brown Palace

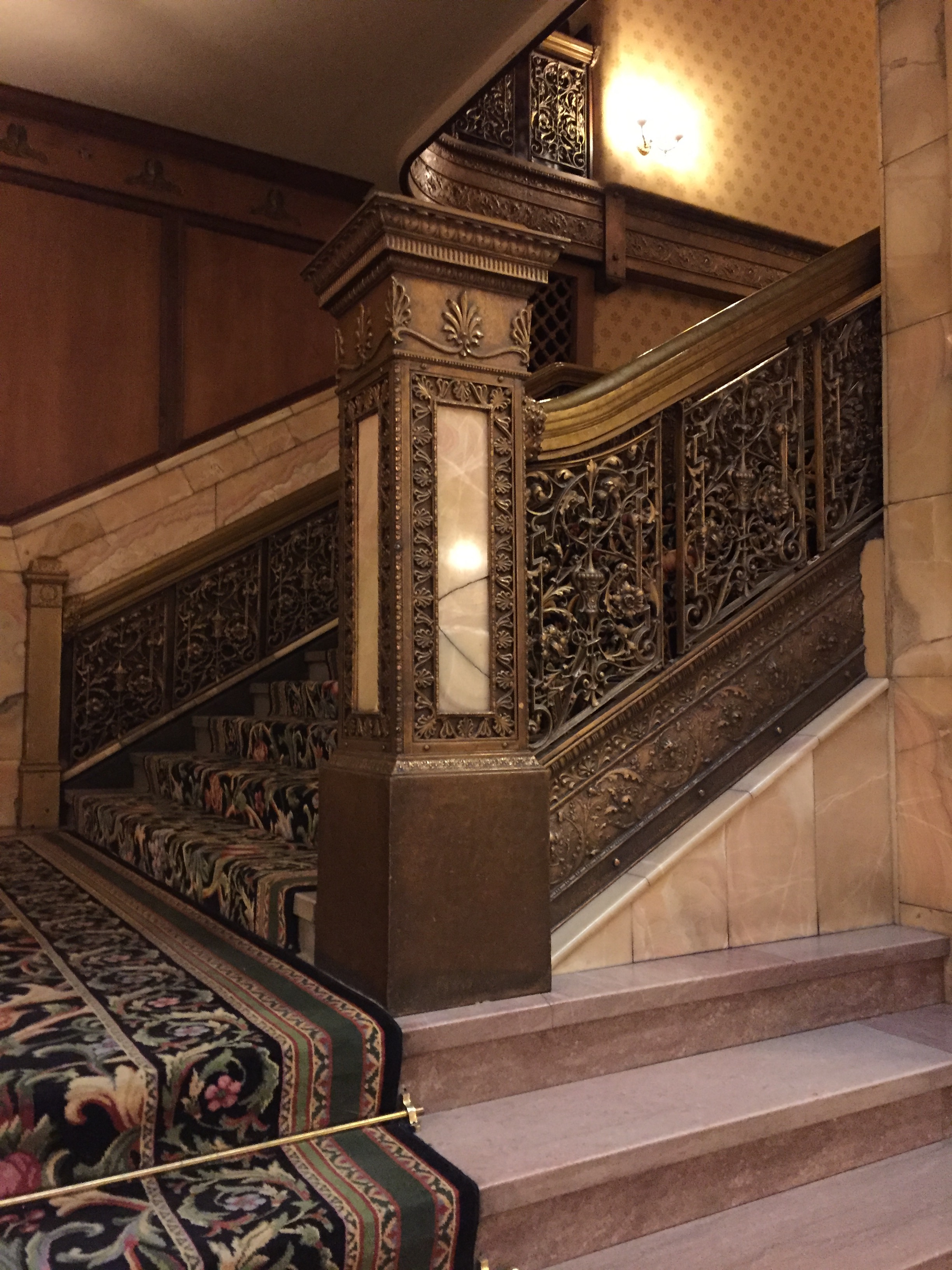
Historic staircase detail and interior design in The Brown Palace

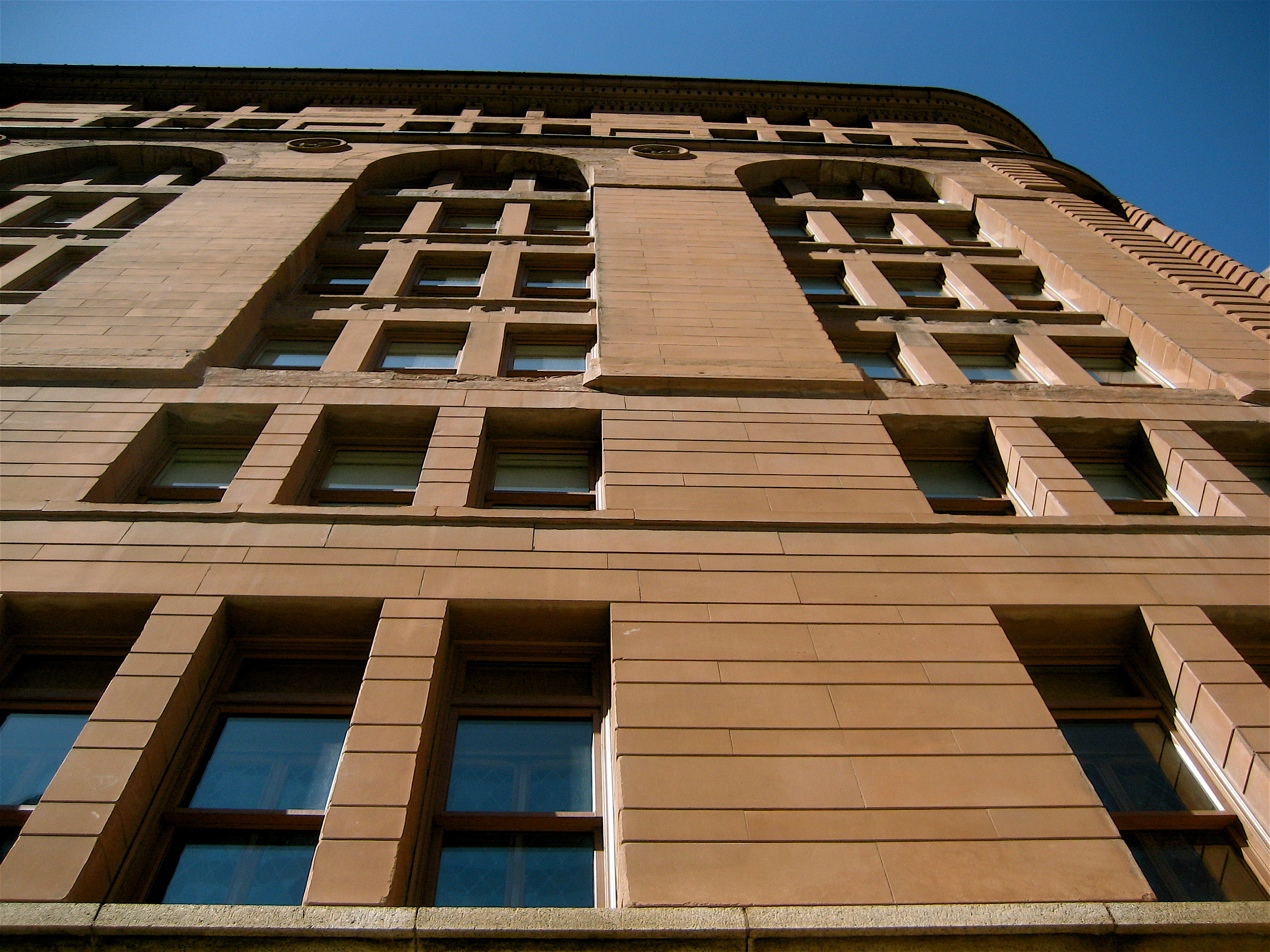
Brown Palace outer facade

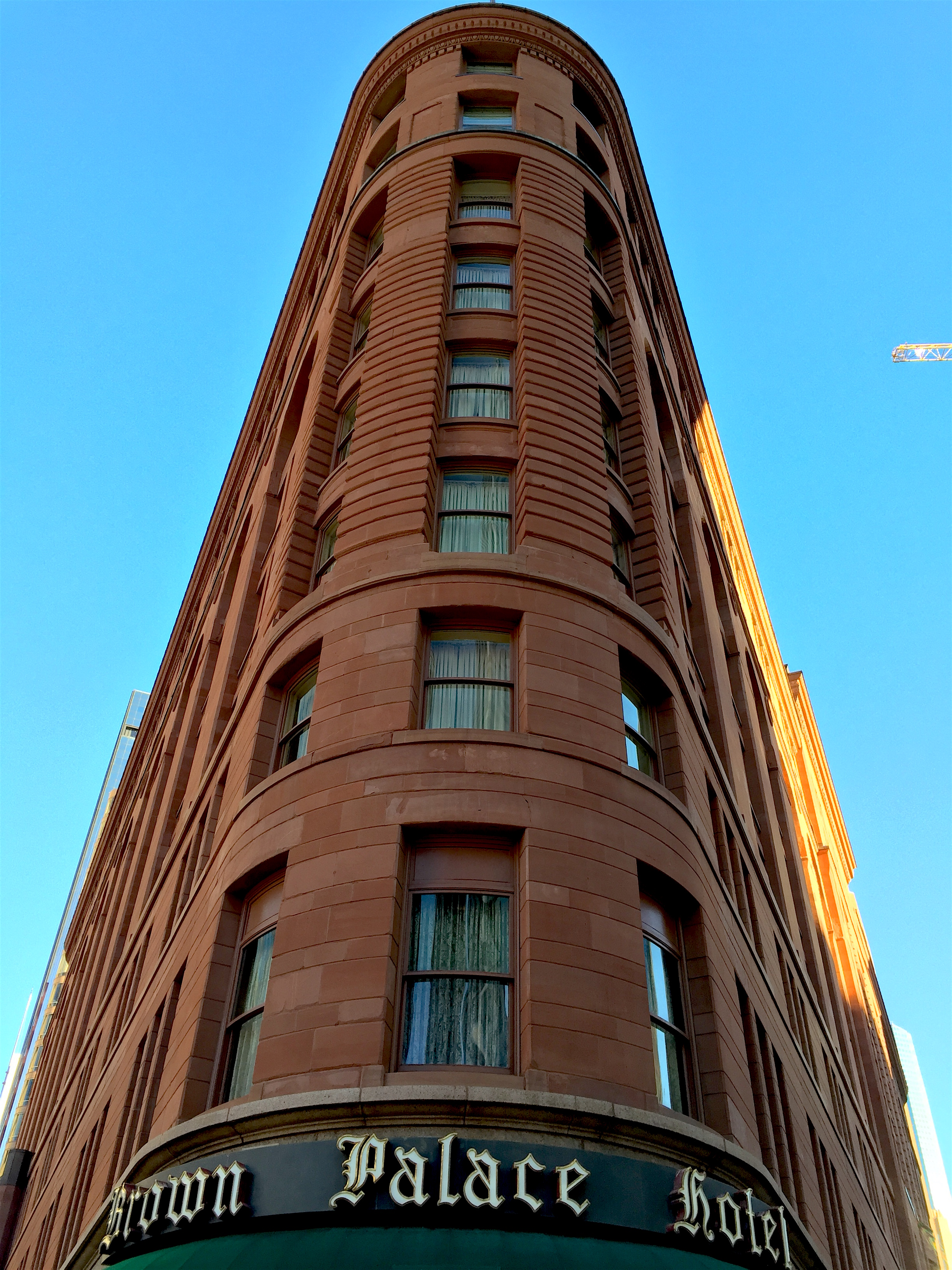
Standing on the flatiron shaped corner of The Brown Palace, looking up it is easy to see how dramatically angled the building is.

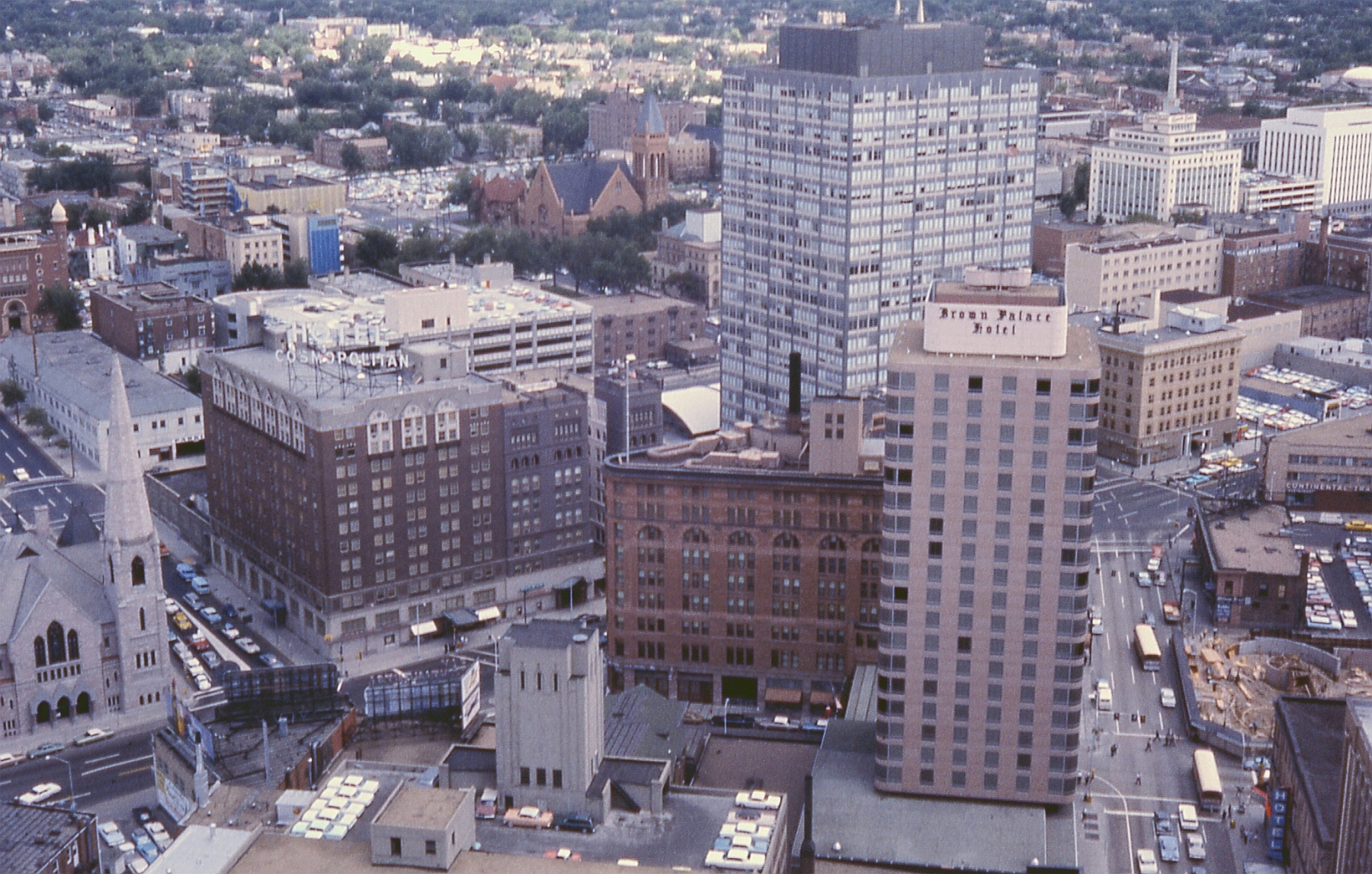
The Brown Palace and its then-new annex tower, seen in 1964

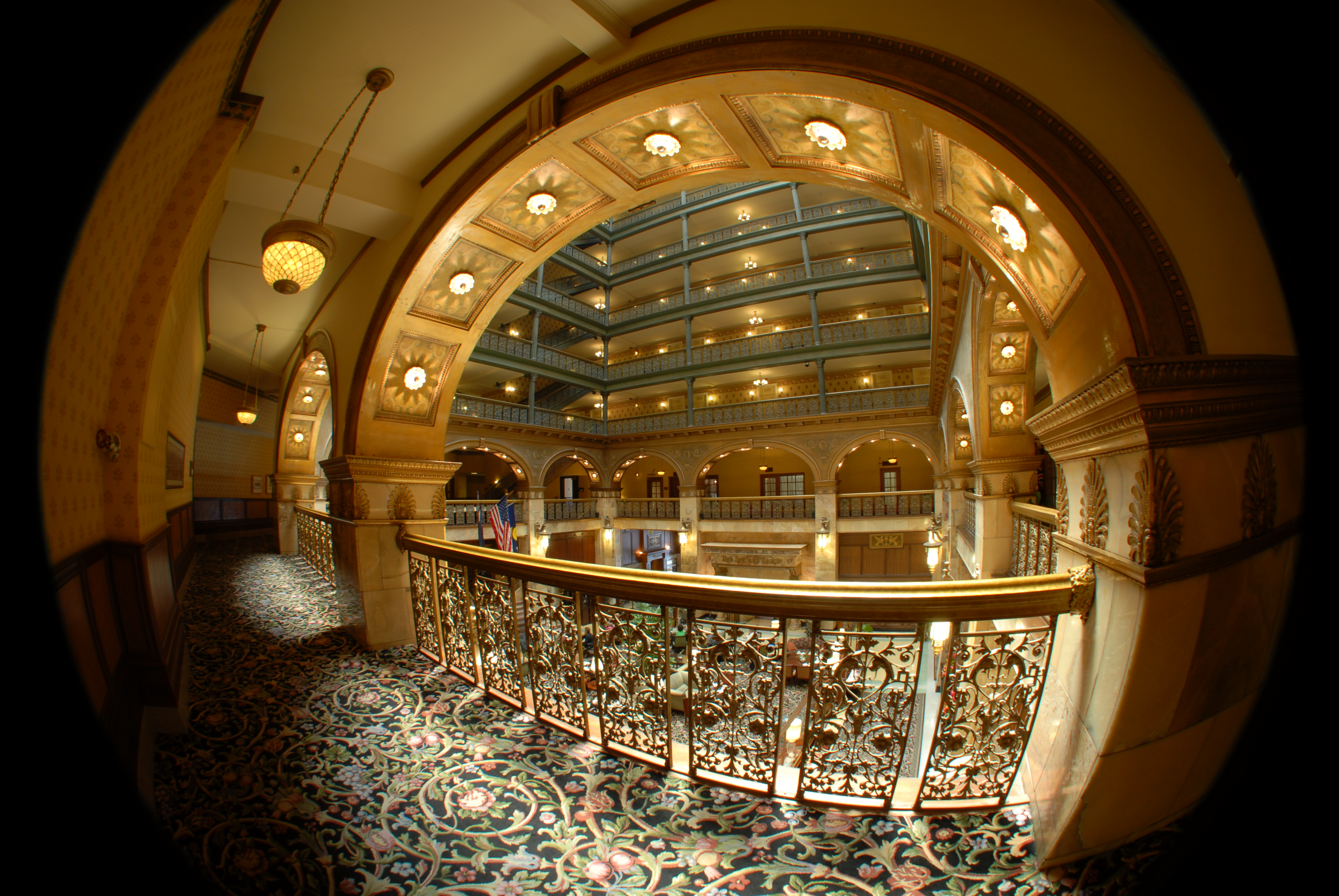
Brown Palace Interior and Atrium

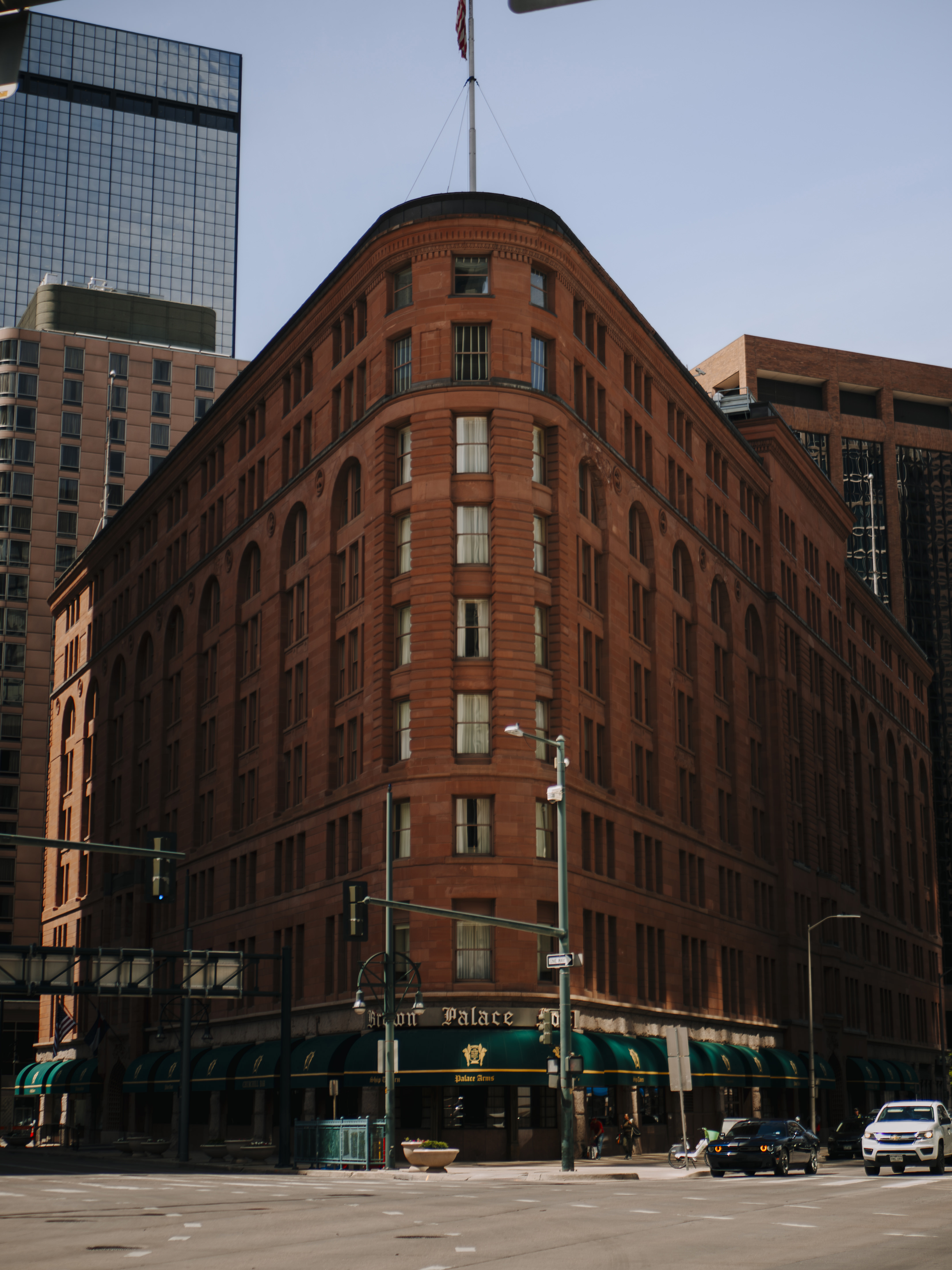
Front facing view of The Brown Palace Hotel in 2024
