= Central Presbyterian Church (Denver) =

Historic church in Colorado, United States

- U.S. National Register of Historic Places
- Colorado State Register of Historic Properties
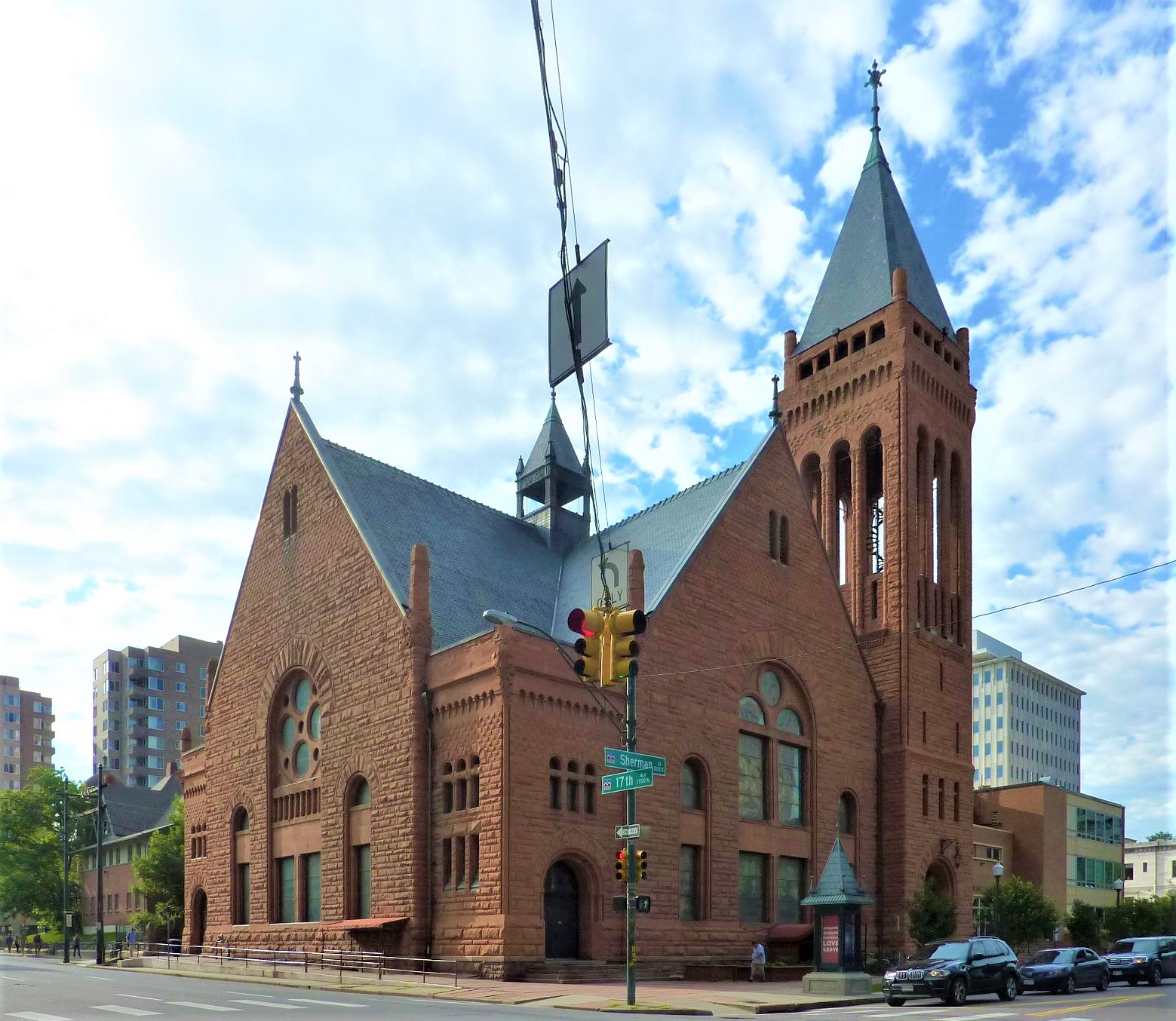

- Location within Colorado Location within the United States
- Location: 1660 Sherman St., Denver, Colorado
- Coordinates: 39°44′35″N 104°59′02″W
- Area: 1 acre (0.40 ha)
- Built: 1891–92
- Architect: F.E. Edbrooke
- Architectural style: Richardsonian Romanesque
- NRHP reference No.: 74000565
- CSRHP No.: 5DV.112
- Added to NRHP: November 21, 1974

Central Presbyterian Church is a historic church located in downtown Denver, Colorado. Its building was built in 1891–92 and designed by Frank E. Edbrooke in the Richardsonian Romanesque style. It was added to the National Register of Historic Places in 1974.

The church was an offshoot of the First Presbyterian Church of Denver, which was organized in 1860 when the Reverend A.T. Rankin moved to Denver and placed an ad in the Rocky Mountain News announcing religious services for Presbyterians on the banks of Cherry Creek. The Central Presbyterian Church congregation received its name in 1874.

Its building was documented by the Historic American Buildings Survey in 1969.

The building has been considered one of the three best buildings designed by Edbrooke, and was designed late in his career.

It is described: "'The church is enormous, it is a nearly perfect square and is basically a four-tower type with crossing gables of equal height and length. The feeling of massiveness is derived from its great size and large windows and from the use of Colorado sandstone laid in horizontal bands like Richardson's later work. In the words of art historian Richard Brettell, the church is spare, simple and coloristically unified. The walls are sheer and relatively unadorned, rising with a thin and expansive grace. The thin stretched quality is almost exaggerated in the tower where there are long, thin lantern openings topped by ogee arches."
