= Joslin Dry Goods Company Building =

- U.S. National Register of Historic Places
- Colorado State Register of Historic Properties
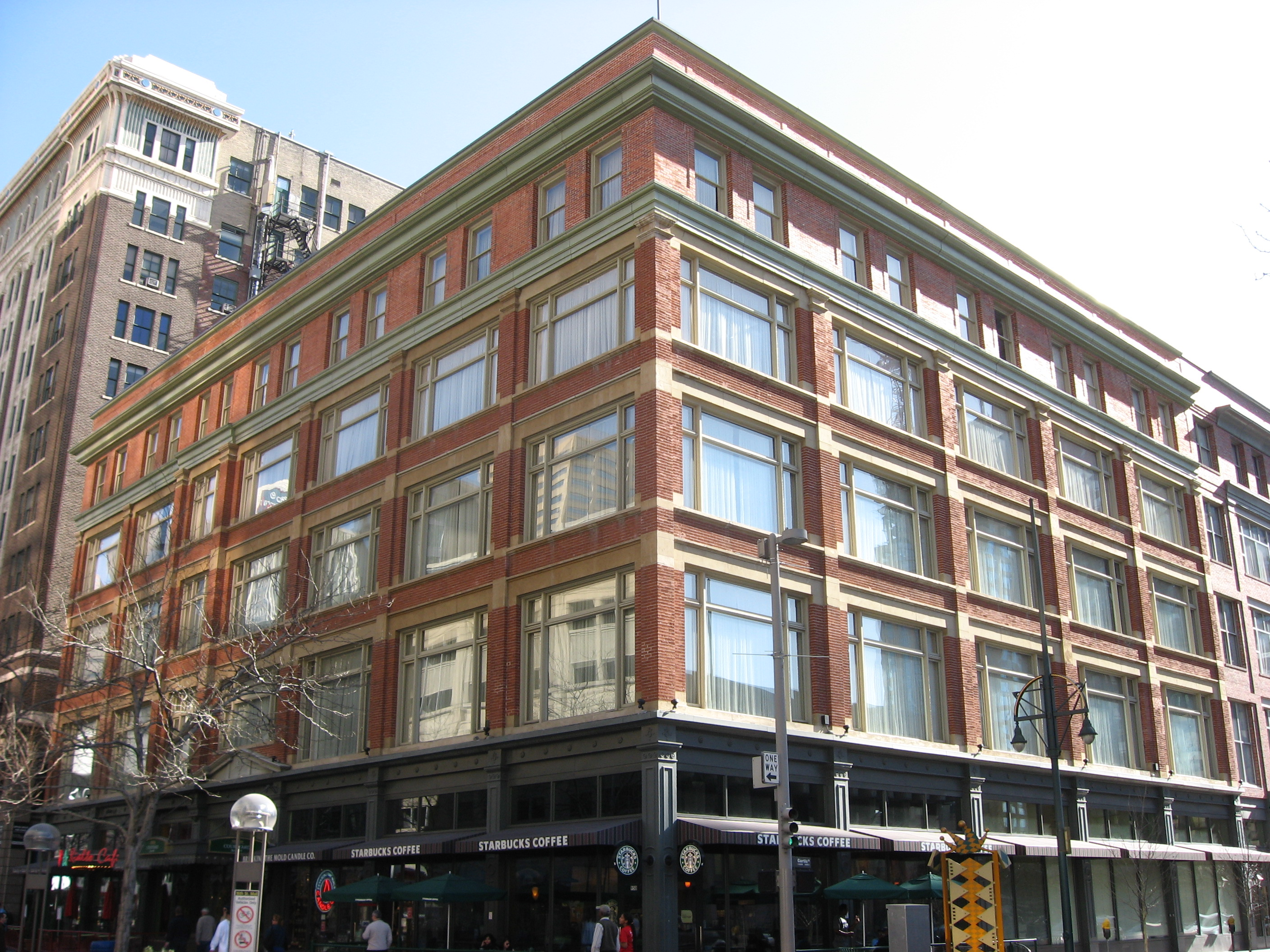
- Building profile

- Location within Colorado Location within the United States
- Location: 934 16th St., Denver, Colorado
- Coordinates: 39°44′49″N 104°59′40″W
- Area: less than one acre
- Built: 1887/1927
- Architect: Frank E. Edbrooke
- Architectural style: Early Commercial, Late 19th and Early 20th Century American Movements
- NRHP reference No.: 97000893
- CSRHP No.: 5DV.1913
- Added to NRHP: August 14, 1997

The Joslin Dry Goods Company Building (also known as the Tramp Building or the Joslin Building) is a historic building in downtown Denver, Colorado.

== Description and history ==
Joslins Department Store began as Joslin Dry Goods Company founded by John Jay Joslin in 1873; It was a direct competitor to The Denver Dry Goods Company which commenced operations in 1888. Joslin's Dry Goods later evolved into a department store and was purchased by Mercantile Stores, a Fairfield, Ohio-based department store conglomerate.

The building was designed by Denver architect Frank E. Edbrooke and renovated in 1902, 1927, and 1964. The company rebranded as Joslins following the 1964 remodel, which also significantly altered the building's exterior.

It was listed on the U.S. National Register of Historic Places in 1997. The building was redeveloped as a 177-room Courtyard by Marriott hotel shortly thereafter.
