= Steamboat Springs station =

Historic depot in Steamboat Springs, Colorado

- Steamboat Springs Depot
- U.S. National Register of Historic Places
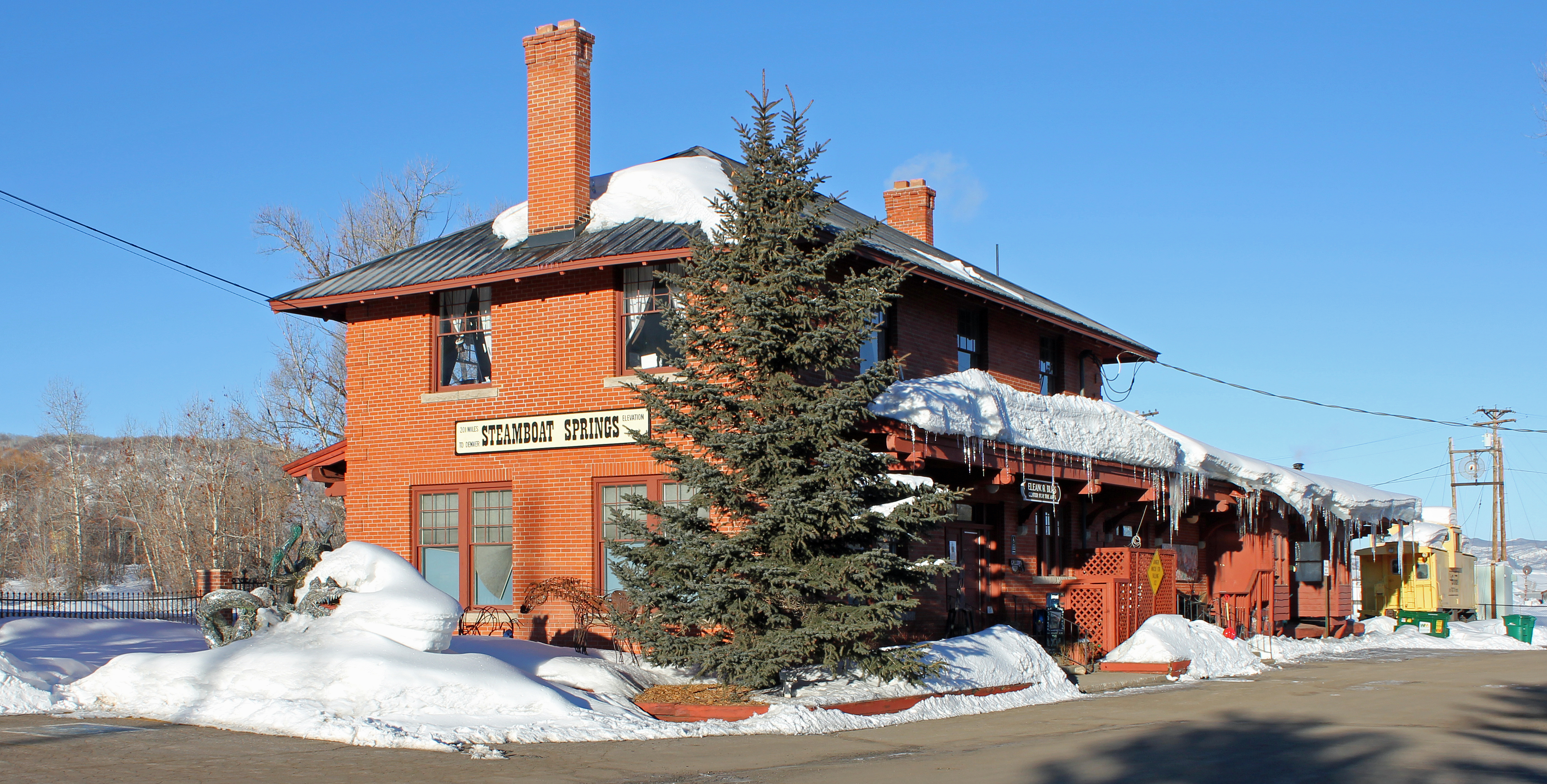

- Location within Colorado
- Location: 39265 Routt County Rd. 33B, Steamboat Springs, Colorado
- Coordinates: 40°29′21″N 106°50′31″W
- Area: 0.3 acres (0.12 ha)
- Built: 1909
- Architect: Frank E. Edbrooke
- NRHP reference No.: 78000884
- Added to NRHP: December 20, 1978

The Steamboat Springs Depot, at 39265 Routt County Rd. 33B in Steamboat Springs, Colorado, was built in 1909. It was listed on the National Register of Historic Places in 1978.

It was deemed "significant for its association with the old Denver, Northwestern & Pacific Railway, the so-called Moffat Road (now part of Rio Grande Industries), one of the major transportation links between Denver and Salt Lake City; for its fine architectural qualities; and because it embodies the distinctive characteristics of a type, period, and method of construction."

It was paid for by subscription of local citizens and was designed by Denver architect Frank E. Edbrooke. It was built in the year after railroad service to Steamboat Springs began. Service ran until 1968.

It was a depot of the Denver & Rio Grande Western Railroad.

By 1977, it had been converted into a theater building.

It is located by the Yampa River in Steamboat Springs.
