= Masonic Temple Building (Denver, Colorado) =

- U.S. National Register of Historic Places
- Colorado State Register of Historic Properties
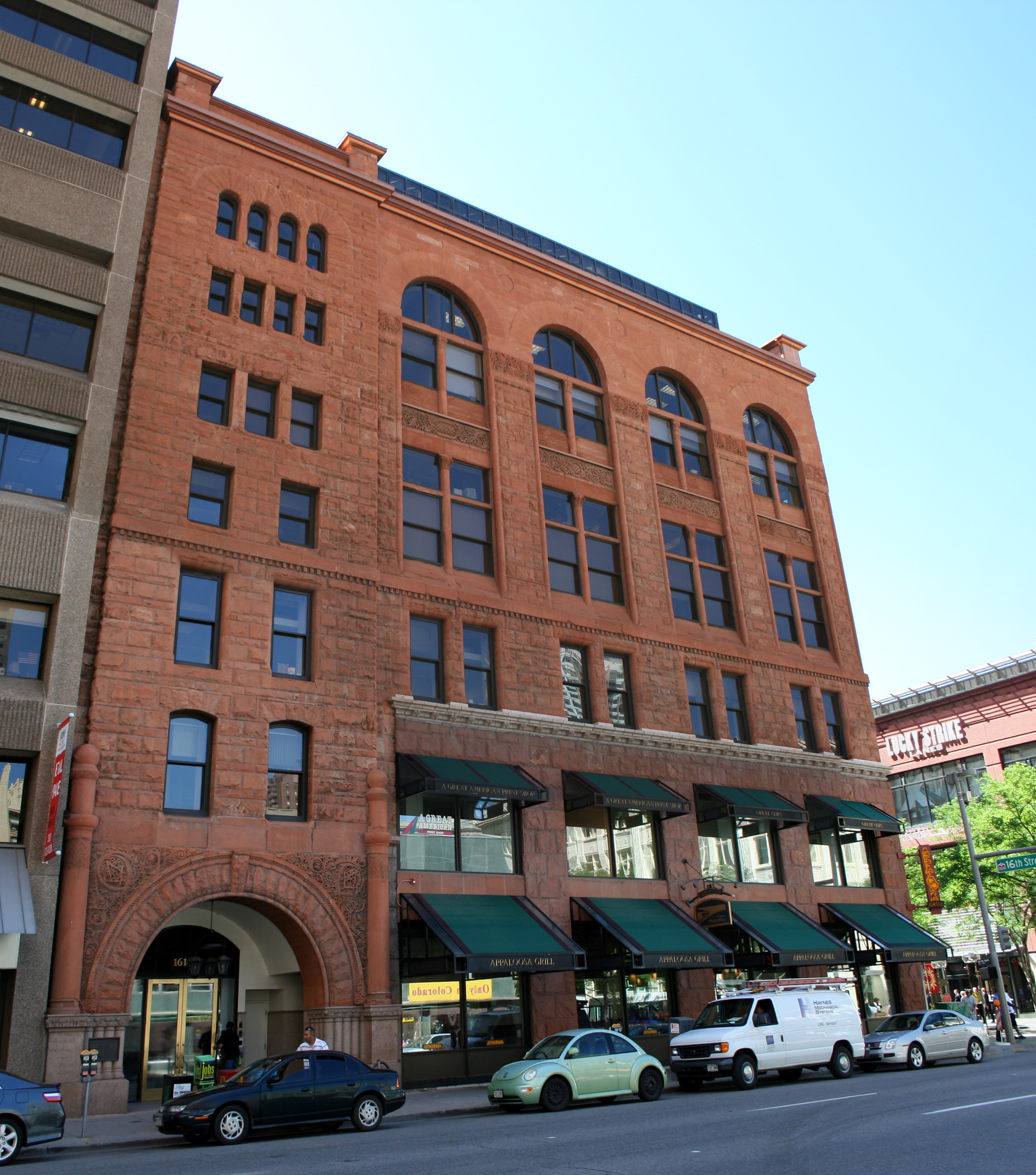

- Location within Colorado Location within the United States
- Location: 1614 Welton St., Denver, Colorado
- Coordinates: 39°44′40″N 104°59′25″W
- Area: 0.3 acres (0.12 ha)
- Built: 1889
- Architect: Frank E. Edbrooke
- Architectural style: Romanesque, Richardsonian Romanesque
- Website: www.denver5.org
- NRHP reference No.: 77000369
- CSRHP No.: 5DV.136
- Added to NRHP: November 22, 1977

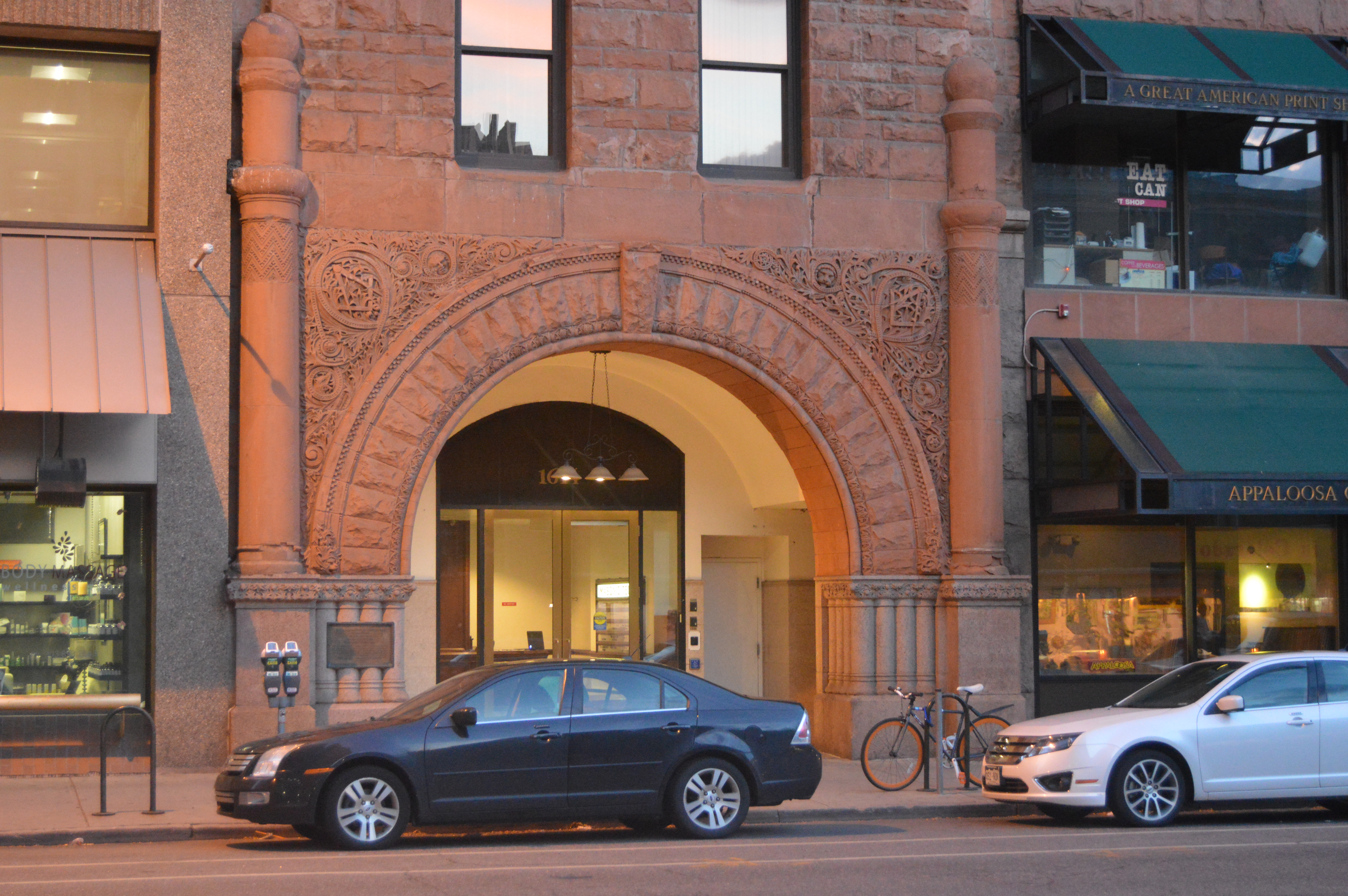
Entry arch of the Masonic Temple Building in Denver, Colorado

The Masonic Temple Building in Denver, Colorado is a Richardsonian Romanesque style building from 1889, designed by Frank E. Edbrooke. It was listed on the National Register of Historic Places in 1977.

The wealth of the Masons in Denver is evident in the fact that no expense was spared in the siting and construction of the building.

== See also ==
- Highlands Masonic Lodge, also NRHP-listed and in Denver
