= Denham Theatre =

Historic theater in Denver, Colorado (1913–1974)

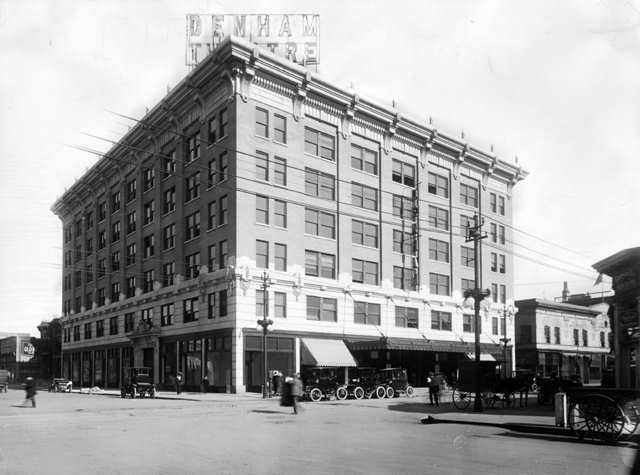
- Interactive map of Denham Theatre
- Former names: Shubert Theatre (during construction, 1913)
- Address: Northeast corner of 18th and California Streets; Denver, Colorado; United States
- Coordinates: 39.7475°N 104.9898°W
- Capacity: 1,700 (1913); 802 (after 1960 remodeling)
- Type: Legitimate theater (1913–1932); Cinema (1932–1974)

Construction
- Opened: November 8, 1913
- Closed: November 19, 1974
- Demolished: early 1975
- Years active: 1913–1974
- Architects: W. A. Swasey or Clymer & Drischler (disputed, see text)

The Denham Theatre was a theater situated at the northeast corner of 18th and California Streets in downtown Denver, Colorado. Originally built as the Shubert Theatre, it was renamed before its opening on November 8, 1913. It operated for 61 years, first as a legitimate theatre house and then as a movie theater, before closing on November 19, 1974. The theater building was later demolished in early 1975 and replaced by a parking garage.

Over its history, the Denham passed through several phases of American entertainment. It first opened as a stock and vaudeville house and then briefly became a union-operated theater during the sound film transition of 1930. Starting in the 1930s, it converted to feature motion pictures under the management of the Cooper family and later under Dave and Vera Cockrill. In 1960, it was extensively remodeled for roadshow cinema. Following this in 1964, the Denham hosted the world premiere of The Unsinkable Molly Brown, a film about the Denver figure Margaret Brown.

== Naming and opening (1913) ==
Construction began on the Shubert Theatre, a Denver house associated with the Shubert theatrical interests, in 1913, overseen by superintendent James Beatty. Work was suspended for several months during a period of financial difficulty and the Cooper Investment Company advanced the money to complete the building. Cooper Investment Company was a firm that had managed the estate of former Colorado governor Job A. Cooper and leased the ground where the building was constructed.

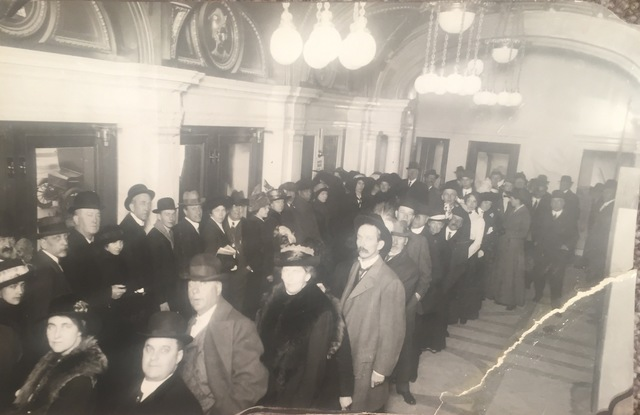
Denham Theatre opening, November 1913

In October 1913, the directors renamed the building shortly before it was opened. They first considered naming it the National, and then decided instead to honor Mrs. Job A. Cooper, the widow of former governor Job A. Cooper, so the building and theater became the Denham Building and the Denham Theatre, respectively. The house was leased to the actor-producer O. E. Woodward of Omaha, who installed a resident stock company in it that was headed by Eva Lang of St. Louis.

The Denham opened on the evening of November 8, 1913, with a play called The Widow's Might. (Note: The contemporaneous Rocky Mountain News review renders the play title "The Widow's Might." Some later sources give it as "The Widow's Mite.") The Rocky Mountain News reported that the house was "packed to the doors with a brilliant audience", the box office was selling standing room, and that hundreds were turned away. On that day, the leading man was Carl Anthony, with Evelyn Booth as ingénue and a supporting cast that included Adele Bradford, daughter of Mary C. C. Bradford, the state superintendent of public instruction. Members of the Denver Woman's Press Club were guests of Woodward. The Colorado Statesman, a Denver Black weekly, noted approvingly that the management had "given employment to several colored girls and men" and that a new play would be produced each week at prices "within reach of all."

=== Architecture and building ===
The Denham was a fireproof building of steel, concrete, and brick, with an auditorium in a blue-and-gold color scheme, deep blue plush seating, a balcony, gallery, and tiers of boxes, lit by more than 3,000 lights. The Rocky Mountain News reported a capacity of about 1,700 seats in what was designed as an 1,800-seat house. The seats were reduced for providing comfort to the patrons. The theater occupied part of a six-story mixed-use building, the Denham Building at 635 18th Street, Denver, which also contained offices. The building was constructed with Colorado-Yule marble.

The design has been attributed to two different architects. At the time, Rocky Mountain News identified the architect as William Albert Swasey of New York, the Shubert organization's house architect, whose other work included the Winter Garden Theatre in New York. The 1913 edition of Sweet's Catalogue of Building Construction, in the reference list of the Colorado-Yule Marble Company, instead credits the St. Louis firm of Clymer & Drischler with the "Schubert Theater Building, Denver," and the Landmarks Association of St. Louis likewise lists the Denver Shubert among that firm's 1909 to 1912 works. (Note: The two attributions cannot be fully reconciled from available sources. Clymer & Drischler also designed the Shubert Theatre in St. Louis. A common arrangement for chain theaters was for a circuit's house architect to provide the design and a local firm to serve as architect of record, but the sources do not establish such a division for the Denver house.)

== Stage years ==
The Denham operated until the early 1930s as a legitimate stage house to present plays, musicals, and vaudeville. A 1963 retrospective in the Rocky Mountain News recalled that the theater, "originally opened by the Shuberts," had "boasted a fine stock company and for years presented many great names in legitimate theater entertainment and vaudeville."

== Union operation (1930) ==
During the transition to sound film, which displaced theater musicians across the country, the Denham became the site of a short-lived union-run operation. In the spring of 1930, the newly organized Denver Co-Operative Amusement Company, formed by members of the local stagehands' and musicians' unions, leased the theater. Billed as "Colorado's first theater to be operated and financed by labor union crafts," the venture was expected to provide work for 56 people, including musicians, stagehands, ushers, and ticket sellers, and drew national press attention. O. D. Woodward, the actor-producer who had opened the original house in 1913, returned as play director. The union theater reopened on April 20, 1930, and ran until late June.

== Motion pictures and the Cockrill era ==
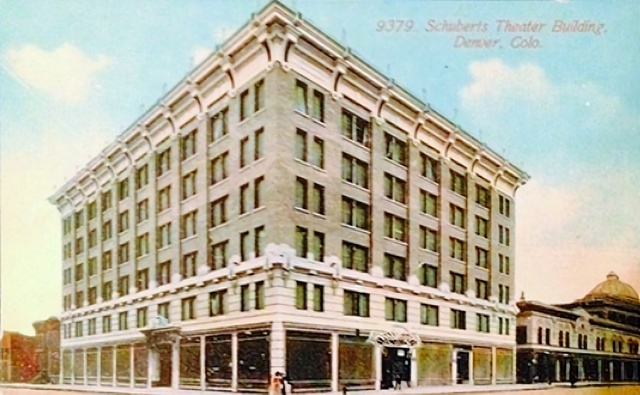
Postcard showing the full Denham building

The Denham was converted to motion pictures in the early 1930s. In the early sound era, the house was managed by Lou Hellborn, with Carson Harris as publicity manager. In May 1934, Hellborn resigned and sold his half-interest to Charles J. Cooper and his son Allen, the family that owned the building, with Allen Cooper succeeding him as manager.

Benjamin David (B. D.) Cockrill, who came to Denver from Salt Lake City with his wife Vera, became managing director of the Denham around 1934. By the middle of 1936, Cockrill had acquired the controlling interest in the theater and by the end of that year, was president of the newly-formed Denham Theatre, Inc. The Cockrill organization, the Denham Theatre Corporation, came to operate its theater in Denver. After Dave Cockrill's death, Vera L. Cockrill continued as the owner and managing director.

== 1960 remodeling and roadshow era ==
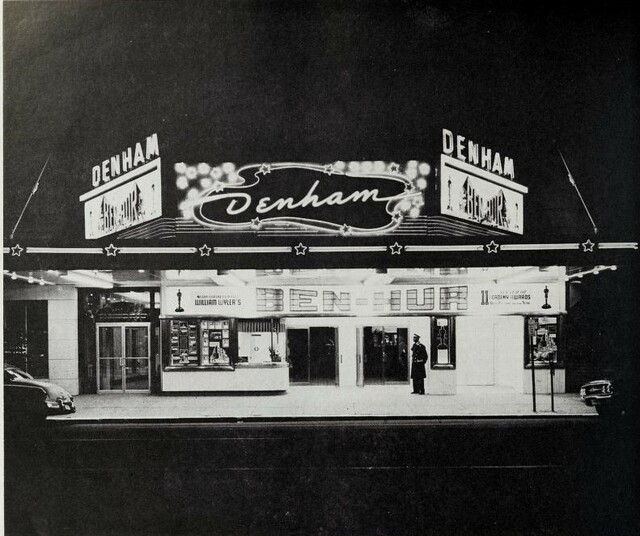
The Denham building in 1961

In the spring of 1960, the Denham underwent a "cellar to garret" remodeling, at a cost of $250,000 (equivalent to $2,720,754 in 2025), to equip it for large-format motion picture spectaculars. Vera Cockrill, the owner, called the project "a dream come true." The seating was reduced from 1,635 to 802 with wider spacing, the top balcony was removed and the lower balcony cut down, and the proscenium arch was widened to accommodate a new screen 53 feet wide and 23 feet high, described as the largest indoor movie screen in Denver. The house was fitted with 70-mm Philips projectors imported from Holland and a six-channel sound system, with construction by the firm of Berglund-Cherney under the supervision of Cecil Hart. Robert Clark was the theater's manager.

The remodeled theater reopened with the roadshow engagement of Ben-Hur (1959). A black-tie premiere was held on the night of April 12, 1960, with public showings beginning April 13. The 1963 retrospective listed the prestige films the Denham had played since the remodeling: Ben-Hur, Exodus, El Cid, West Side Story, King of Kings, Mutiny on the Bounty, and Cleopatra, the last of which was the theater's bill in December 1963. A 1961 Motion Picture Exhibitor Theatre Catalog feature described the renovation as a $250,000 "face-lifting operation" under the supervision of architect Richard L. Crowther, who later remodeled the former Hiawatha Theater, by then the Esquire Theatre, in 1965.

=== The Unsinkable Molly Brown premiere (1964) ===
On June 11, 1964, the Denham hosted the world premiere of MGM's The Unsinkable Molly Brown, starring Debbie Reynolds and Harve Presnell, with Ed Begley, Martita Hunt, Vassili Lambrinos, and Audrey Christie in support. The film dramatized the life of Margaret Brown, a survivor of the Titanic disaster whose public identity was tied to Denver and Colorado, which gave the Denver booking a local resonance.

== Adult films, closure, and demolition ==
By the late 1960s and early 1970s, the Denham like any other aging single-screen houses in downtown Denver, had shifted toward adult-film programming. In 1971, the theatre was leased to Highland Theatres and new owners of Denham building became Urban Investment and Development Co. of Chicago, builders of Denver Plaza. Its final bill was a double feature of American Graffiti and Last Summer. The theater's display advertisement in the The Rocky Mountain News on November 15, 1974, read, "Highland theatres announces the closing of Denver’s oldest and most beloved theatre... The Denham, the luxurious Denham will close its doors forever at midnight, Tuesday night, November 19th", thus marking the end of its operation after 61 years.

The closing was tied to the construction of the First of Denver Plaza, a 32-story office tower along California Street between 17th and 18th Streets, across the street from the Denham Building. In a follow-up feature, the former owner of Denham, Vera L. Cockrill, stated that the building was empty and would be demolished for new construction, further adding, "the lights will never flash on again at the wonderful old Denham." The theater was demolished in early 1975, and the site was used for a parking garage on 18th Street.

== See also ==
- Esquire Theatre (Denver)
- Mayan Theatre
