= Colorado Heights University =

Private university in Denver, Colorado, US

- Former names: Loretto Heights College, Teikyo Loretto Heights University
- Type: Private university
- Active: 1989–2016
- Parent institution: Teikyo University
- Officer in charge: Fred Van Liew
- Students: 400+
- Location: Denver, Colorado, United States; 39°39′41″N 105°01′40″W
- Campus: Urban
- Colors: Black, Red, Grey, and White

Colorado Heights University was a private university in Denver, Colorado, United States. It was part of the Teikyo University Group. In March 2009, it changed its name from Teikyo Loretto Heights University (TLHU) to Colorado Heights University and later to Colorado Advanced University in July of the same year.

It opened in 1989 on the former Loretto Highlands College campus.

== History ==
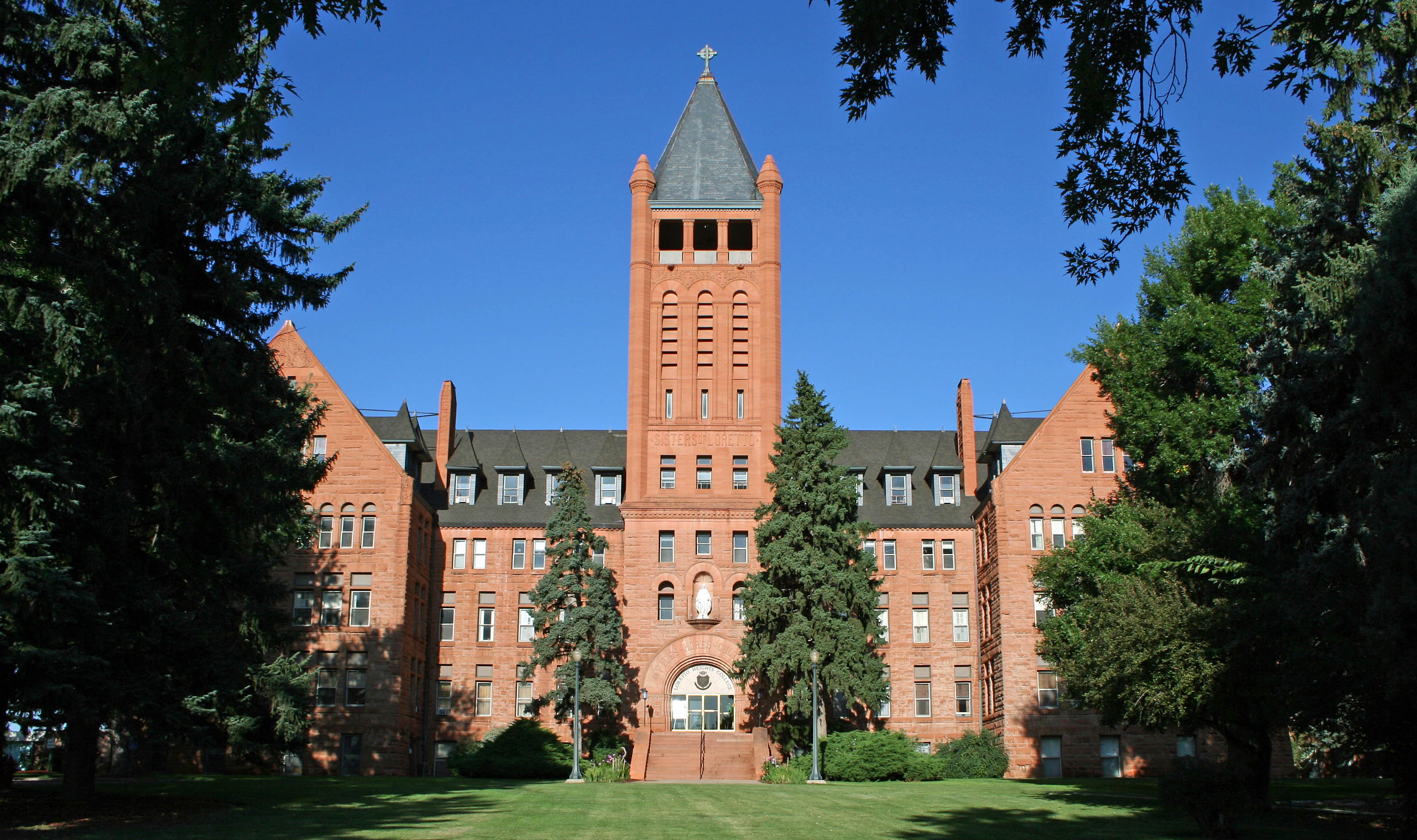
Colorado Heights University

At the end of the 19th century, Mother Pancratia (Mary Louise Bonfils), of the Sisters of Loretto, had the vision to educate women in the Rocky Mountain region. In 1886, Loretto Heights Academy was founded as a Catholic girls' high school in the building later used as Colorado Heights University's Administration Building.

The landmark Administration Building was a Romanesque six-story structure, designed by Denver architect Frank E. Edbrooke (1840-1921). The Administration Building was built from red sandstone and has been on the National Register of Historic Places since 1975.

Over the years, the school became a college and expanded to include teacher education programs, nursing programs, business, dance and more for both men and women. The campus now has almost 20 structures, including a 1,000-seat theater, an interfaith chapel, a swimming pool, cafeteria, residence halls and recreational amenities.

In 1989, Teikyo Loretto Heights University (TLHU) opened on the campus of the former Loretto Heights College. TLHU focused on international students. In 2009, TLHU rebranded to Colorado Heights University. Colorado Heights University was owned by the Teikyo University Group, a multinational educational foundation based in Japan that operates many undergraduate and graduate universities with more than 70,000 students spread across 46 campuses worldwide.

In November 2016, Teikyo University Group announced that Colorado Heights University would close due to falling enrollment numbers.

== Academics ==
Colorado Heights University's academic calendar was semester-based.

Colorado Heights University focused on interdisciplinary business degree programs and English as a Second Language (ESL) courses. It offered Intensive English and Test of English as a Foreign Language (TOEFL) preparation certificate programs, the Bachelor of Arts in International Business, and various specializations in the Master of Business Administration in International Business.

== Campus ==
The campus consisted of 20 buildings on a 74-acre (300,000 m^{2}) site, the highest area in Denver. The Administration Building opened in 1891. Its prominent bell tower could be seen from miles around, serving as a landmark for many Denver residents.

== Students ==
Most of the students at Colorado Heights University were non-traditional college students. This demographic includes international students, students enrolling in college for an additional or delayed degree, and students who speak a language other than English as their native tongue.

In addition to the diversity of languages, those students also represented a diversity of cultures, religions and educational backgrounds. Students represented more than 60 countries from Europe, Africa, Asia and the Americas.

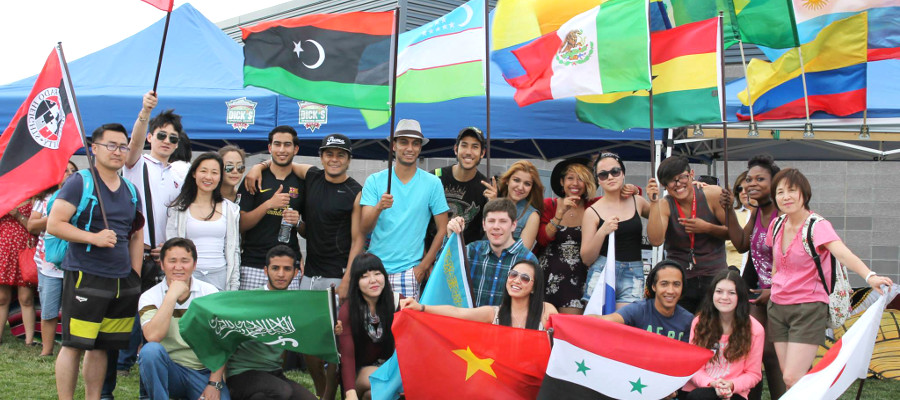
