= Oxford Hotel (Denver) =

- The Oxford Hotel
- U.S. National Register of Historic Places
- Colorado State Register of Historic Properties
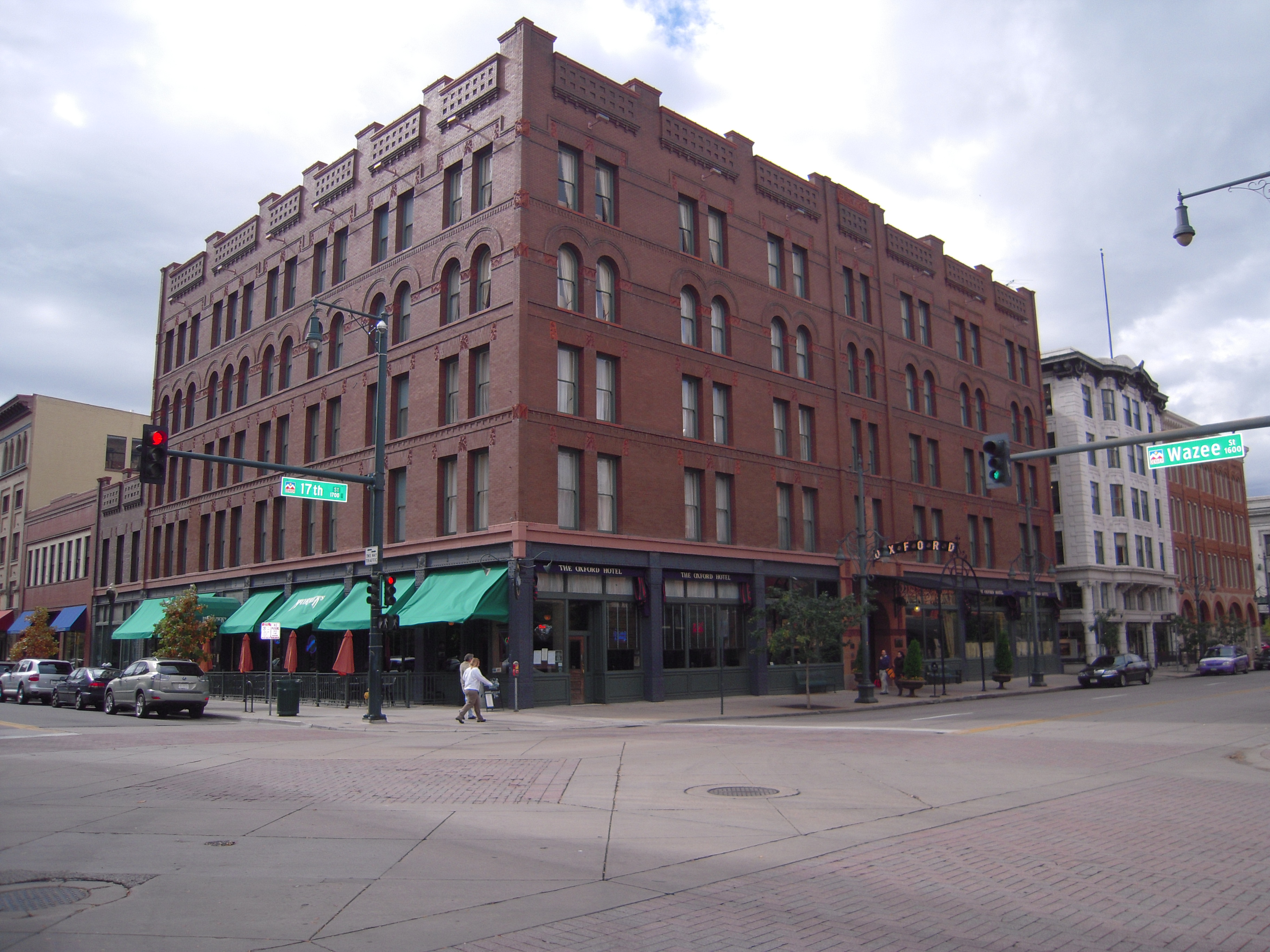

- Location within Colorado Location within the United States
- Location: 1612 17th St., Denver, Colorado
- Coordinates: 39°45′7″N 104°59′55″W
- Area: 0.5 acres (0.20 ha)
- Built: 1891
- Architect: Multiple
- NRHP reference No.: 79000590
- CSRHP No.: 5DV.47.62
- Added to NRHP: April 17, 1979

The Oxford Hotel is a historic building in Denver, Colorado, which was designed by early Denver architect Frank Edbrooke, and built in 1891. It was listed on the National Register of Historic Places in 1979. The Cruise Room is a hotel bar with historic art deco interior, that was operated as an illicit speakeasy.

== History ==
The Oxford Hotel was built in 1891.

In February 1908, Bill Haywood and two other officers of the Western Federation of Miners were secretly held overnight in adjacent rooms in the Oxford, by the Denver police. Their stay at the Oxford was kept secret so their supporters could not try to block their extradition early the next morning by a special train to Idaho, to be tried for conspiracy in the assassination of a former governor of Idaho.

In the 1950s, the Oxford Hotel was considered a flophouse. In the 1980s a new owner improved the hotel.

The hotel restaurant was operated by McCormick's Fish House from when they signed a lease with the Oxford Hotel in 1987 until 2016. Today, Urban Farmer Steakhouse operates as The Oxford Hotel's restaurant partner.

== The Cruise Room ==
The Cruise Room is a bar located within the Oxford Hotel, considered a historic, upscale cocktail lounge, and known for its preserved Art Deco interior. It officially opened the day after prohibition ended. The bar is a single, windowless room, on the ground floor of The Oxford Hotel, located between the Corner Bar at the hotel restaurant and the hotel lobby.

=== History ===
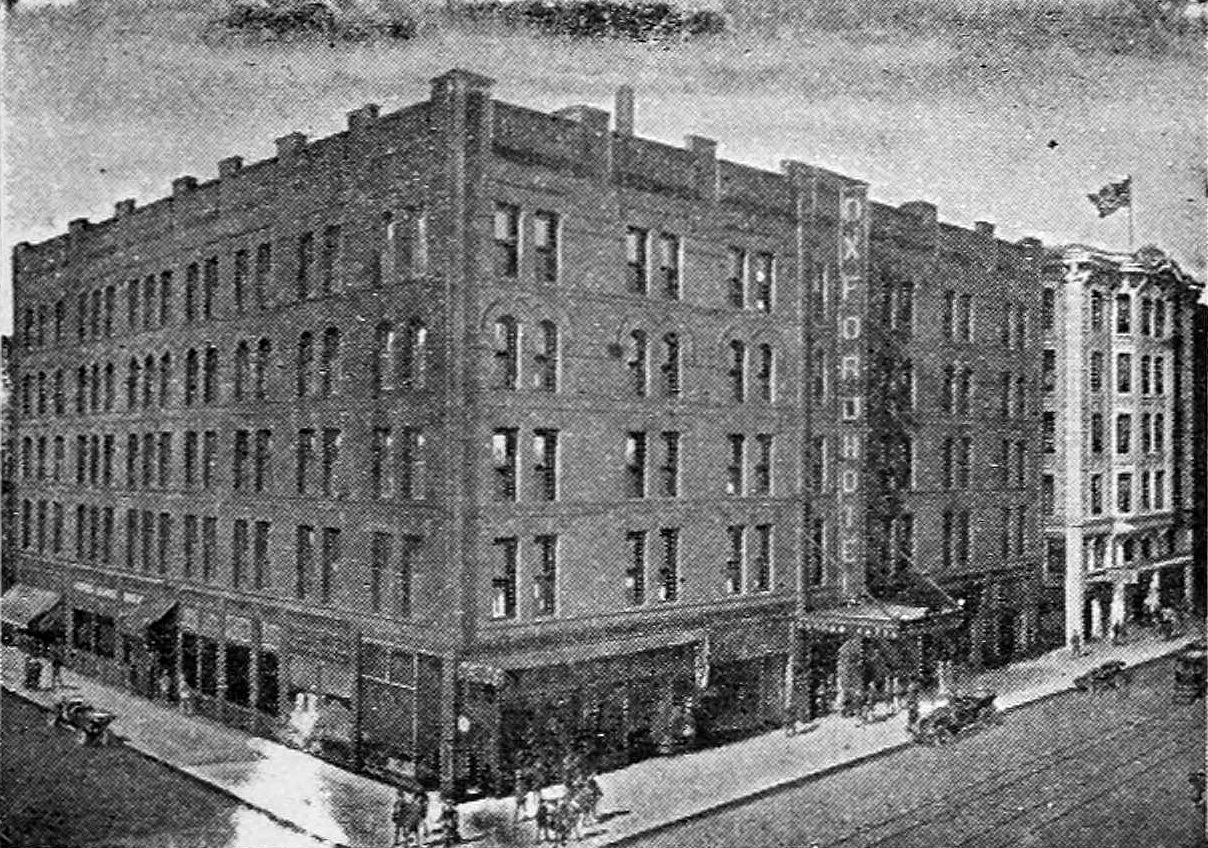
Oxford Hotel, 1921

The bar opened as part of the Oxford Hotel in 1891, and was known for its martinis, though not originally named the Cruise Room.

During prohibition, The Cruise Room operated as an illicit speakeasy. Employees know of secret paneling and tunnels.

The Cruise Room was officially opened (with its full interior and full bar) the day after Prohibition ended. As an extension of the hotel and its restaurant, this bar has operated continually since its official opening.

The Cruise Room has remained an independent establishment, managed in a partnership between the operator of the restaurant (now Urban Farmer, owned by Sage Restaurant Collection) and the Oxford Hotel.

In 2012, the Cruise Room was restored, including historically accurate paint and light-pumpkin color. The marble floor was also replaced. This restoration was initiated by owner/developer Dana Crawford, who became a partner in the Oxford Hotel in 1980.

The drinks menu was also updated, emphasizing contemporary "mixology", and includes drinks like "Pineapple Julep", "Whiskey Clover Smash", and "Pomegranate Sling". The bar also offers more than a dozen martinis, served from oversized martini shakers.

=== Interior design ===
The interior was modeled after a lounge on the ocean liner RMS Queen Mary. The design was by Denver architect Charles Jaka, and featured Art Deco bas-relief wall panels that stretch from floor to ceiling, created by Denver artist Alley Henson. Each panel depicts a "toast" from a different culture around the world. The interior has an unusual color juxtaposition, with red lighting shining down on chrome trim and historically accurate light-pumpkin-colored walls. The entire room is subtly shaped like a wine bottle.

One of the wall panel depicts Germans toasting, and features Hitler. This panel was taken down during World War II, and was replaced by one depicting Ireland.
