= Frank E. Edbrooke =

American architect

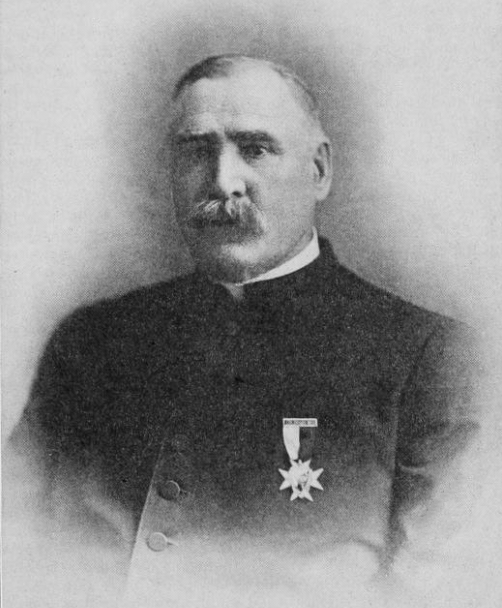
- Born: November 17, 1840; Lake County, Illinois, US
- Died: May 3, 1921 (aged 80); Glendale, California, US
- Occupation: Architect
- Spouse: Camilla S. Gilman (m. 1871)

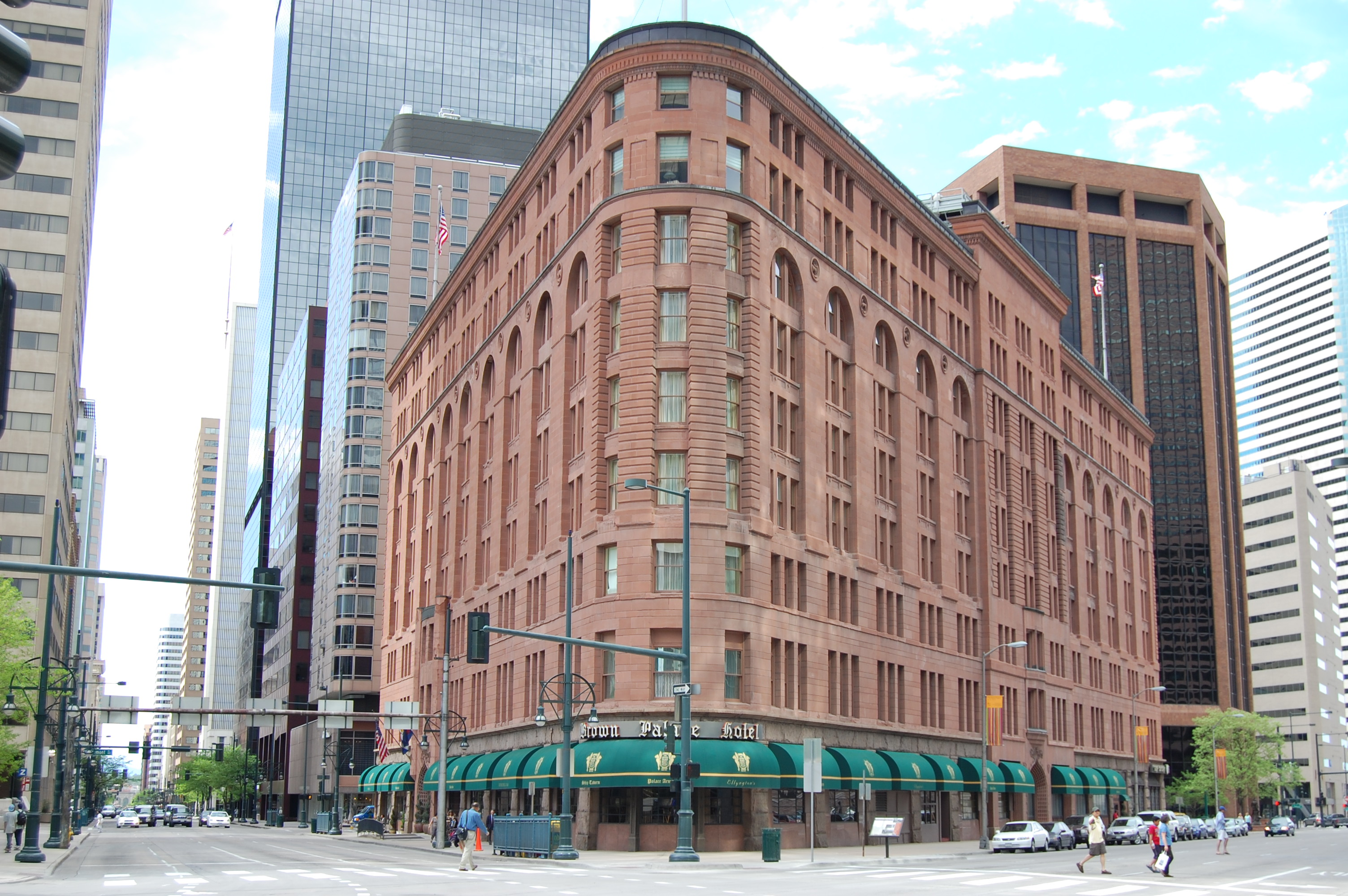
Brown Palace Hotel

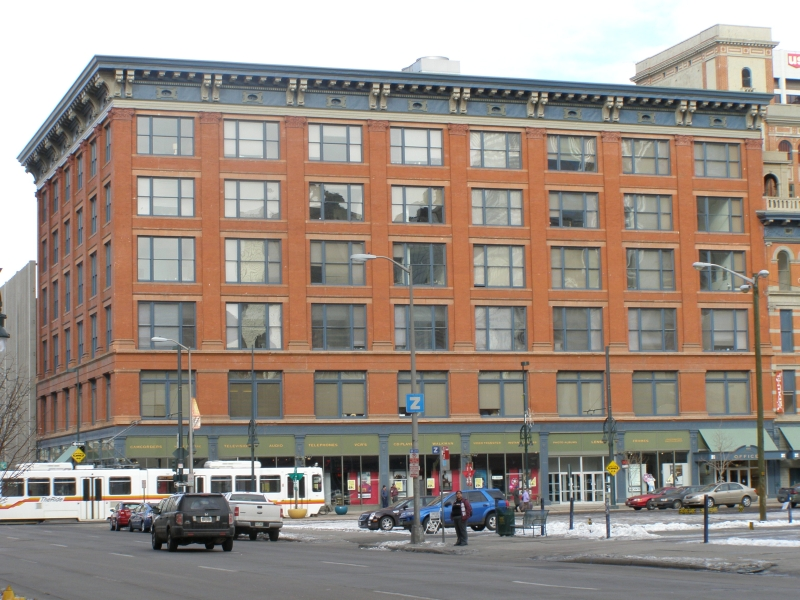
Denver Dry Goods Company Building

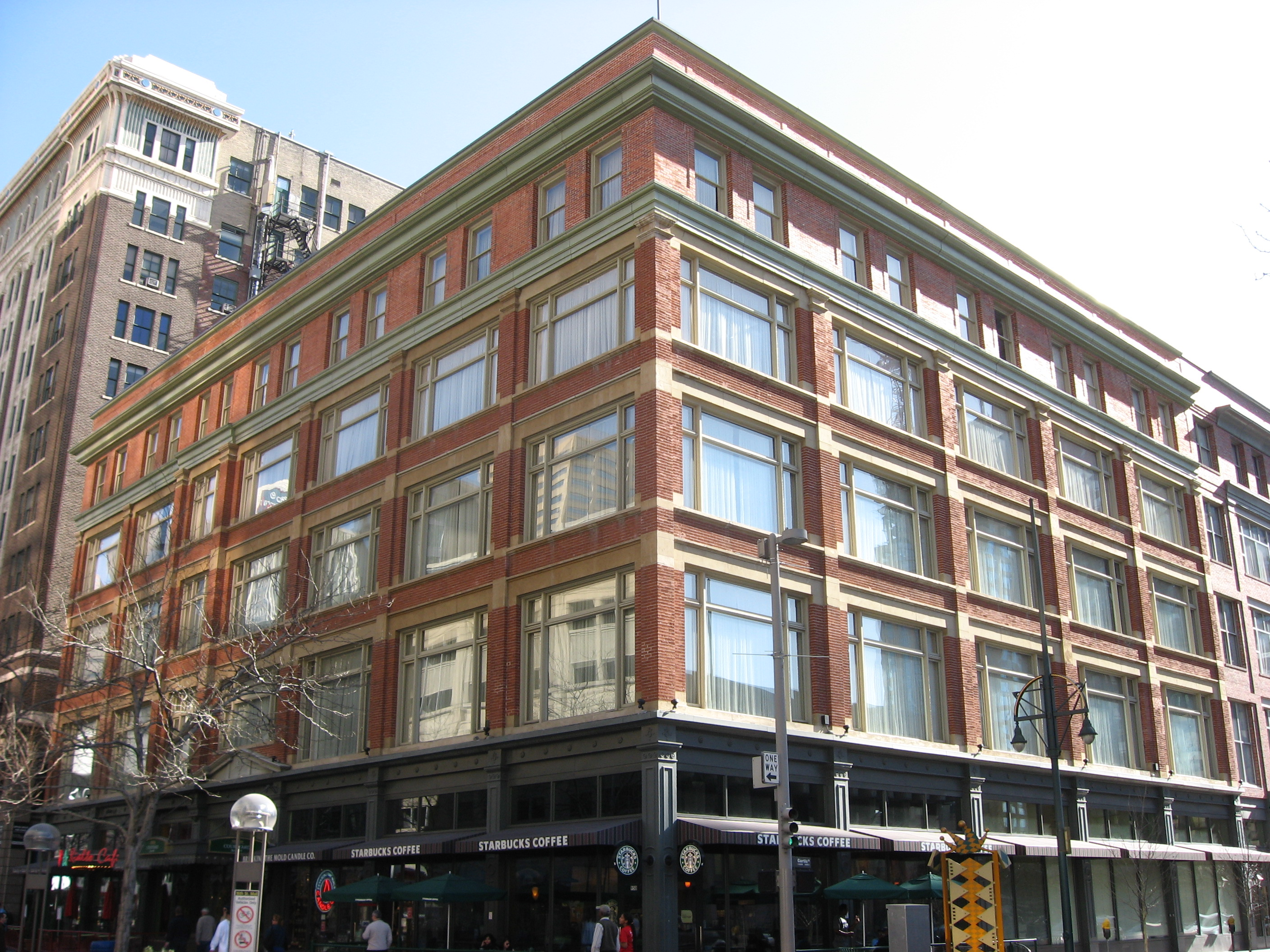
Joslin Dry Goods Company Building

Frank E. Edbrooke (November 17, 1840 – May 3, 1921) was a 19th- and early 20th-century architect in Denver, Colorado, who has been termed the "dean" of Denver architecture. Several of his surviving works are listed on the National Register of Historic Places including Brinker Collegiate Institute, built in 1880 and NRHP-listed in 1977.

== Biography ==
Frank E. Edbrooke was born in Lake County, Illinois on November 17, 1840. After attending public schools in Chicago, he became an apprentice builder. During the Civil War, he served with the 12th Illinois Infantry Regiment.

He married Camilla S. Gilman on December 25, 1871.

His brother was nationally prominent architect Willoughby J. Edbrooke (1843–1896), who served as Supervising Architect for Federal buildings during 1891–1892. Willoughby's son, Harry W. J. Edbrooke, worked with Frank.

Frank E. Edbrooke died in Glendale, California on May 3, 1921.

== Collaborators ==
Architect Frederick Sterner worked as a draftsman with architect Frank E. Edbrooke and had a twenty-year career in Colorado.

Architect Hart Wood, in 1900, joined Frank E. Edbrooke & Company, who had designed the Brown Palace Hotel (1892).

== Works (attribution to Frank E. Edbrooke, and variations on his name) ==
- Brinker Collegiate Institute, built 1880, 1725–1727 Tremont Pl., Denver, CO (Edbrooke, F.E.), NRHP-listed
- Brown Palace Hotel, 17th St. and Tremont Pl., Denver, CO (Edbrooke, Frank E.), NRHP-listed designed with an odd triangular shape
- Burlington Hotel, 2205 Larimer St., Denver, CO (Edbrooke, Frank E.), NRHP-listed
- Bernalillo County Courthouse, 2000 Lomas Blvd NW, Albuquerque, NM (Edbrooke, Frank E.), demolished, 1910
- Alfred Butters House, 1129 Pennsylvania, Denver, CO (Edbrooke, Frank E.), NRHP-listed
- Central Presbyterian Church, 1660 Sherman St., Denver, CO (Edbrooke, F. E.), NRHP-listed
- Denver Dry Goods Company Building, 16th and California Sts., Denver, CO (Edbrooke, Frank E.), NRHP-listed
- William G. Fisher House, 1600 Logan St., Denver, CO (Edbrooke, Frank E.), NRHP-listed
- Hendrie and Bolthoff Warehouse Building, 1743 Wazee, Denver, CO (Edbrooke, Frank E.), NRHP-listed
- Joslin Dry Goods Company Building, 934 16th St., Denver, CO (Edbrooke, Frank E.), NRHP-listed
- Loretto Heights Academy, 3001 S. Federal Blvd., Denver, CO (Edbrooke, F.E.), NRHP-listed
- Masonic Temple Building, Richardsonian Romanesque style building from 1889, 1614 Welton St., Denver, CO (Edbrooke, Frank E.), NRHP-listed
- Riverside Cemetery, 5201 Brighton Blvd., Denver, CO (Edbrooke, Frank E.), NRHP-listed
- George Schleier Mansion, 1665 Grant St., Denver, CO (Edbrooke, F.E.), NRHP-listed
- Silverton Miner's Union Hospital, 1315 Snowden Street, Silverton-San Juan County, CO (Edbrooke, Frank E.)
- Spratlen-Anderson Wholesale Grocery Company-Davis Brothers Warehouse, 1450 Wynkoop St., Denver, CO (Edbrooke, Frank E.), NRHP-listed
- Steamboat Springs Depot, 39265 Routt County Rd. 33B, Steamboat Springs, CO (Edbrooke, Frank E.), NRHP-listed
- Temple Emanuel, 2400 Curtis St., Denver, CO (Edbrooke, Frank E.), NRHP-listed
