= Philip Knatchbull (film executive) =

British film executive and producer

The Honourable Philip Knatchbull
- Born: 2 December 1961 (age 64); London, England
- Occupations: Film executive; Film producer
- Years active: 1987–present
- Spouse: Wendy Knatchbull (married 2002—present)
- Children: Daisy Knatchbull (daughter); Freddy Knatchbull (son)
- Parent(s): Patricia Knatchbull, 2nd Countess Mountbatten of Burma (mother); John Knatchbull, 7th Baron Brabourne (father)
- Relatives: Louis Mountbatten, 1st Earl Mountbatten of Burma (paternal grandfather)

Philip Knatchbull is a British film executive whose work spans film development, production, distribution, and exhibition. He is best known for his long association with Curzon, where he was chief executive officer from 2006 to 2023. He returned to the company in 2024 as interim chairman, before being appointed chief executive officer and chairman in 2026.

Knatchbull has also received executive producer credits on a number of film productions, including 45 Years (2015), Kneecap (2024), Ballad of a Small Player (2025), and I See Buildings Fall Like Lightning (2026).

== Early life ==
Knatchbull was born on 2 December 1961 in London, England. He is the son of film producer John Brabourne, whose productions included Franco Zeffirelli's Romeo and Juliet and David Lean's A Passage to India and Patricia Knatchbull, 2nd Countess Mountbatten of Burma. Through his paternal family, Knatchbull is a grandson of Louis Mountbatten, 1st Earl Mountbatten of Burma.

== Career ==
After attending film school, Knatchbull established a production company. When the business proved financially inconsistent, he left the film industry and moved into investment, running a technology and media investment fund. His investments included an online news service, an online music company and a French internet service provider.

In 2006, Knatchbull, through Knatchbull Communications Group, partnered with Act Entertainment Group in the acquisition of Artificial Eye, a leading United Kingdom distributor of arthouse and foreign-language films. At the time of the acquisition, Artificial Eye owned a library of more than 200 films and operated the Chelsea Cinema and the Renoir in London. The acquisition combined Artificial Eye's cinema operations with Curzon Mayfair, Curzon Soho and the Richmond Filmhouse under a new subsidiary.

In 2012, the Tabatznik Family Trust acquired a substantial equity stake in Curzon Artificial Eye through an investment in the company's parent group. As part of the transaction, Knatchbull signed a new three-year contract as group chief executive officer, while a new employee share option scheme was also introduced.

During his tenure, Curzon Cinemas, Curzon Film and Curzon Home Cinema were unified under the Curzon brand. The company expanded from an initial base of two venues to 20 cinemas across London and the United Kingdom. Knatchbull also oversaw the growth of Curzon Film as an independent film distributor in the United Kingdom and Ireland. During this period, the company released more than 400 films theatrically and distributed, winning numerous Academy Awards and British Academy Film and Television Awards. In 2020, Curzon Film released Parasite in the United Kingdom and Ireland, where it became the highest-grossing subtitled film at the box office in those territories. Discussing the release of Parasite, Knatchbull stated that Curzon departed from its usual day-and-date release strategy and instead pursued a 16-week theatrical window, which multiplexes required for the film.

In 2010, Knatchbull launched Curzon Home Cinema, a streaming platform that enabled same-day releases for films in cinemas and on the platform. The service was originally launched as Curzon On Demand before being rebranded as Curzon Home Cinema in 2013.

By 2017, Curzon had expanded to 47 screens across 21 sites in the United Kingdom. Under Knatchbull's leadership, Curzon adopted a day-and-date release strategy, acquiring both theatrical and home-entertainment rights to films and releasing them simultaneously in cinemas and through Curzon Home Cinema.

In 2019, Curzon was acquired by Cohen Media Group. Knatchbull remained chief executive officer following the acquisition.

Knatchbull stepped down as chief executive officer in 2023 after 17 years in the role. Following his departure, he worked on a memoir titled Swallowtail, described as "a memoir about my life which includes the whole Curzon story", and traveled in India with his wife.

In November 2024, Knatchbull returned to Curzon as interim executive chairman following the company's acquisition by Fortress Investment Group. His return followed the departure of Edward Fletcher, who had been chief executive officer since November 2023. The change in leadership came after Fortress Investment Group acquired Curzon for $5 million following a legal dispute involving Cohen Media Group owner Charles S. Cohen and Fortress over an alleged default on a $534 million loan.

In a 2025 interview with Screen Daily following his return, Knatchbull described Curzon as "stable" and stated that the future of independent film distribution would increasingly involve multi-territory rights partnerships and international collaborations. He also discussed the Curzon CM Development Fund, a partnership with Madman Entertainment in Australia and Cineart in Belgium established to develop films and secure local distribution rights in multiple territories. The fund had 12 films in development and four films in production, including Bad Apples and Ballad of a Small Player.

In July 2026, Knatchbull was chairman and chief executive officer of Curzon. In the same month, Curzon was reported to be developing a flagship venue to broaden the company's neighborhood cinema model. The venue would include three auditoriums, podcast studios, a writers' room and a full-service restaurant.

== Industry perspective ==
In 2016, Knatchbull opined that global cinema admissions could decline significantly as audiences increasingly shifted toward alternative viewing models and streaming platforms. Speaking at Screen International's Exhibitors' Forum, Knatchbull stated that audiences "want to consume films in a different way" and argued that cinema operators needed to adapt to changing viewing habits and younger audiences.

In 2019, Knatchbull supported flexibility in theatrical release windows during industry debates surrounding streaming platforms and cinema exhibition. Responding to criticism from cinema chain Vue regarding Netflix's release strategy for Roma, Knatchbull stated that Curzon had seen growth in both cinema attendance and engagement with Curzon Home Cinema, adding that "it is not evident that streaming has to be in conflict with cinema-going". He also emphasized on audience choice and criticized the limitations of the traditional 16-week theatrical release window.

During the COVID-19 pandemic in 2020, Knatchbull stated that Curzon's vertically integrated structure of combining cinemas, film distribution and streaming through Curzon Home Cinema allowed the company to adapt more quickly to cinema closures. He also said the pandemic had accelerated changes already underway, including changes to theatrical release windows and the growing role of streaming distribution.

In 2025, Knatchbull spoke at the CinemaVision 2030 conference in Berlin alongside Cannes Film Festival general delegate Thierry Frémaux. Knatchbull discussed the potential of AI to expand the reach of international cinema beyond its local markets, citing technology that could replicate an actor's voice in different languages. He also raised concerns about the rapid consumption of data by AI.

== Industry awards ==
In 2017, Curzon received the British Academy Film Awards for Outstanding British Contribution to Cinema in recognition of its contribution to British film exhibition and distribution.

Accepting the award on behalf of Curzon, Knatchbull described the company's role as helping filmmakers "get their incredible films seen" and reaffirmed Curzon's commitment to supporting independent and international cinema. During the speech, Knatchbull also expressed concern about the potential impact of Brexit on European Union cultural support and film funding for independent cinema in the United Kingdom. He also stated that Curzon would continue to support "challenging new films with bold, diverse and authentic voices" through its cinemas and digital platforms.

== Filmography ==
Year	Title	Role	Note
1987	Retirement Hobbies for Octogenarians	Producer	Short film
1987	People Are the Same the Universe Over	Producer	Short film
1987	Crime in the City	Producer	Short film
1991	Paul McCartney's Get Back	Producer	
2008	The Last Thakur	Executive producer	
2010	In Our Name	Executive producer	
2013	Le Week-End	Executive producer	
2015	45 Years	Executive producer	
2017	Williams	Executive producer	
2018	Only You	Executive producer: Curzon	
2024	Kneecap	Executive producer	
2025	Ballad of a Small Player	Executive producer: Curzon CM Development Limited	
2026	I See Buildings Fall Like Lightning	Executive producer	

== Personal life ==
Knatchbull married Wendy Amanda Leach in 2002. They have two sons: Frederick "Freddy" Knatchbull, a model, British Army Reserve member and television personality, and John Robin "Rocky" Knatchbull. From a previous marriage, Knatchbull has one daughter: Daisy Knatchbull, a fashion designer, and a step son Tom Vereker. He is also step father to Wendy's daughter, Phoebe Knatchbull, who works in public relations.
