= Cohen Media Group =

American film production, distribution, and exhibition company

- Type: Private
- Industry: Film
- Founded: 2008
- Founder: Charles S. Cohen
- Headquarters: New York City, United States
- Products: Motion pictures
- Services: Film production, distribution, restoration, and exhibition
- Owner: Charles S. Cohen
- Divisions: Cohen Film Collection
- Subsidiaries: Landmark Theatres; HanWay Films

Cohen Media Group is an American film production, distribution, restoration, and exhibition company founded in 2008 by real-estate developer Charles S. Cohen. The company distributes independent, foreign-language, and art-house films in North America, restores and releases classic films through the Cohen Film Collection, and owns the specialty cinema chain Landmark Theatres.

The company expanded from distribution and restoration into exhibition through Cohen's purchase of New York's Quad Cinema, the 2018 acquisition of Landmark Theatres, and the 2019 acquisition of the British art-house group Curzon Cinemas. Curzon was acquired by Fortress Investment Group in 2024 after a foreclosure auction involving Cohen-related assets.

== History ==
Cohen Media Group was launched in 2008. By 2012, when former Miramax and National Geographic Films executive Daniel Battsek joined the company as president, CMG was acquiring, producing, and distributing independent and foreign-language films. Later releases included Timbuktu, Mustang, and The Salesman; the Los Angeles Times described CMG in 2018 as a company specializing in foreign and art-house titles and noted that The Salesman won the 2017 Academy Award for best foreign-language film. CMG's website says the company has distributed more than 120 features and shorts.

Cohen's investment in classic-film rights became a second part of the company's identity. In 2011, he acquired the Rohauer Library, a collection assembled by film archivist and distributor Raymond Rohauer, and renamed it the Cohen Film Collection. The collection included hundreds of titles associated with silent comedy, early Hollywood, experimental film, and foreign cinema, including works by Buster Keaton and D. W. Griffith. By 2022, TheWrap described the Cohen Film Collection as containing more than 800 films, including works by Keaton and Merchant Ivory Productions. The company restored and reissued classic films theatrically and on home video, including titles in the Keaton and Merchant Ivory catalogs.

In 2022, CMG acquired the British international sales company HanWay Films, founded by producer Jeremy Thomas. TheWrap reported that HanWay would continue as an independent unit selling theatrical titles to international distributors, with Peter Watson remaining president and Gabrielle Stewart as chief executive.

== Exhibition ==
Cohen bought the Quad Cinema in Greenwich Village in 2014 and reopened it in 2017 after a renovation. Surface described the Quad as adding an exhibition arm to Cohen Media Group, which by then produced, distributed, restored, and exhibited films.

In December 2018, CMG acquired Landmark Theatres from Wagner/Cuban Companies, the company associated with Mark Cuban and Todd Wagner. The Los Angeles Times reported that Landmark then operated 52 theaters with 252 screens in 27 cities, specializing in independent and foreign films along with selected Hollywood releases. Boxoffice Pro reported that Landmark president and chief executive Ted Mundorff described the acquisition as making CMG a vertically integrated company, while saying Landmark would continue to show first-run films from multiple distributors.

In December 2019, CMG acquired Curzon Cinemas, including its 13 British locations, the Curzon Artificial Eye distribution division, and the Curzon Home Cinema streaming business. The purchase gave CMG a second art-house exhibition network after Landmark.

== Financial dispute and theater contraction ==
In March 2024, PincusCo reported from court filings that Fortress Credit Corp., an affiliate of Fortress Investment Group, alleged default on a 2022 Cohen-related loan with an original principal of $533.6 million (equivalent to $587,057,084 in 2025) and claimed $544.3 million (equivalent to $558,619,126 in 2025) was due. The report said the loan was secured by real estate assets as well as assets related to Landmark and Curzon. PincusCo noted that the filing represented one party's position.

In July 2024, Business of Home reported that Fortress had submitted a revised foreclosure plan under the Uniform Commercial Code that included separate auctions for several Cohen-related assets, including the Landmark Theatres business and three theaters and the Curzon Cinemas business. A New York Supreme Court judge later cleared the auction to proceed.

The dispute coincided with further contraction at Landmark. In Denver, Landmark closed the Esquire Theatre in July 2024 after the building's owners announced an adaptive-reuse plan, and closed Chez Artiste the following month after previously saying that venue would remain open. The Denver Gazette reported in August 2024 that Landmark had closed both the Esquire and Chez Artiste in the previous month, leaving the Mayan Theatre and Landmark at Greenwood Village as its remaining Denver-area locations, and that the company had offloaded 19 of its 27 Denver screens since 2017.

At the November 2024 foreclosure auction, no one bid for full ownership of Landmark Theatres or its concession business, while Fortress bid for the United Kingdom movie-theater and film-distribution assets. The same month, The Guardian reported that Fortress had acquired Curzon and that Cohen had used the Landmark and Curzon cinema chains and other property assets to secure the loan.
