= Battsek =

Battsek is a surname. Notable people with the surname include:

- Daniel Battsek (born 1958), British film producer and executive
- John Battsek, British documentary film producer
