= Elzer =

Elzer is a surname. Notable people with the surname include:

- Karl Elzer (1881–1938), German film actor
- Olivier Elzer (born 1979), French chef
