= John Cowan (photographer) =

British photographer (1929–1979)

- Born: John Anthony Cowan; 22 April 1929; Gillingham, Kent, England
- Died: 26 September 1979 (aged 50)
- Known for: Photography

John Anthony Cowan (22 April 1929 – 26 September 1979) was a British fashion photographer known for his dynamic photographic style when picturing the fashion icons of 1960s London.

== Early life ==
John Anthony Cowan was born on 22 April 1929 at Gillingham, Kent, the only child of Irving Cowan and his wife, Elizabeth Edith Cowan (née Cobley).

== Career ==
Flying High, 1966, exemplifies Cowan's energetic photographic style.

Cowan was known for his dynamic photographic style which reflected the energetic atmosphere of 1960s Swinging London. The Victoria and Albert Museum say, "John Cowan ... epitomised the playful, graphically dynamic style of commercial photography practised in London during the period. His partnership with model and photographer Jill Kennington sparked an exciting period of high-octane image-making for numerous magazines." Among the magazines and newspapers Cowan worked for were Vogue, Queen, Harper's Bazaar, Elle, The Observer, the Sunday Times, the Daily Express and the Sunday Express, the Daily Mail, and the Daily Mirror.

Cowan's London studio was one of the main sets for Michelangelo Antonioni's 1966 film Blow-Up and Cowan was one of the photographers, with David Bailey, Terence Donovan, Brian Duffy and others, who were used to create the composite character of Thomas in the film. Cowan's energy and unconventional approach inspired the memorable scene in Blow-Up where David Hemmings as Thomas kneels over Veruschka as he photographs her. In a 2011 interview for Vanity Fair, Kennington commented "The David Hemmings–and-Veruschka scene for Blow-Up was pure Cowan. Antonioni must have seen him working—I never saw anyone else take pictures quite that way. The shooting on the floor downwards, completely fluid, unhindered by tripods, etc., was typical Cowan." Kennington recalled the physical nature of her shoots with Cowan, saying "he clambered anywhere, including onto his Land Rover roof, to achieve a great angle. Luckily, I was born a mountain goat, and many photographic adventures involved jumping or hanging off buildings." According to the Daily Telegraph, the Hemmings–and-Veruschka scene "came to symbolise the film".

== Personal life ==
Cowan was married twice. His first wife was a nurse, Joyce Gordon (b. 1929). They married in June 1950 at Bearstead, Kent, and their daughter Nicola was born on 13 July 1954. They divorced in 1954. On 19 September 1959, Cowan married his second wife, Sydney Smith (b. 1934), and they separated in February 1963 and divorced on 4 July 1967. They had three daughters: Carolyn Cowan (born 7 February 1960, therapist, fashion designer and photographer), Atalanta (born 20 June 1962, who married Philip Knatchbull, son of John, Baron Brabourne, and his wife Patricia, Countess Mountbatten of Burma, and is the mother of Daisy Knatchbull) and Justine (born 31 July 1963).

On 26 September 1979, he died of cancer in East Hagbourne, Oxfordshire.

== Books ==
- Dahlgren, Anna (2020). Fashioned in the North: Nordic Histories, Agents and Images of Fashion Photography. Nordic Academic Press. ISBN 9789188661937.
- Quant, Mary (2011). Mary Quant: My Autobiography. Headline Publishing Group. ISBN 9780755360178.

== Selected exhibitions and shows ==
- ‘Swinging Sixties London: Photography in the Capital of Cool Past’ an exhibition at FOAM Museum in Amsterdam (2015).
- ‘Mary Quant’ an exhibition at The V & A Museum in London (2019, 2020).
- ‘John Cowan’ photographs are part of an ongoing collection at the National Portrait Gallery in London.
