= Daisy Knatchbull =

British fashion and founder of Knatchbull

- Born: Daisy Isadora Louise Knatchbull; 5 October 1992 (age 34)
- Education: Benenden School
- Alma mater: University of Leeds (BA)
- Occupations: Fashion designer, businesswoman
- Partner: Giovanni Damiani (engaged)
- Father: Philip Knatchbull
- Relatives: Patricia Knatchbull, 2nd Countess Mountbatten of Burma (paternal grandmother); John Knatchbull, 7th Baron Brabourne (paternal grandfather); John Cowan (maternal grandfather)

Daisy Isadora Louise Knatchbull (born 5 October 1992) is a British fashion designer, businesswoman and founder of Knatchbull (formerly The Deck), the first female-only tailor on Savile Row.

== Early life and family ==
Knatchbull was born on 5 October 1992 to the Hon. Philip Knatchbull (born 1961) and Atalanta Cowan (born 1962). Her paternal grandparents are Patricia, 2nd Countess Mountbatten of Burma, and John, 7th Baron Brabourne. Her maternal grandfather is photographer John Cowan. She is the great-granddaughter of Louis, 1st Earl Mountbatten of Burma, First Sea Lord and the last Viceroy of India. Her parents divorced in 2000. She has two younger half-brothers from her father's second marriage to Wendy Leach (born 1966), including Frederick "Freddy" Knatchbull (born 2003), known for his appearance on Made in Chelsea. She also has a younger stepsister Phoebe (born 1995, from her stepmother's first marriage to Alexander John Wills). Through her father, she is a third cousin of William, Prince of Wales.

Knatchbull was educated at Benenden School and graduated with a Bachelor of Arts in philosophy from the University of Leeds in 2015.

In April 2026, Knatchbull and music executive Giovanni Damiani announced their engagement.

== Career ==
Knatchbull worked as assistant to the fashion director of The Sunday Times Style magazine and as communications director at H. Huntsman & Sons. In 2017, Knatchbull gained press attention for wearing a morning suit in the Royal Enclosure at Royal Ascot.

In 2019, Knatchbull launched Knatchbull, the first female-only tailor to have a shopfront on Savile Row. In October 2024, The Deck rebranded as Knatchbull. Knatchbull has dressed Catherine, Princess of Wales, India Hicks, Sarah, Duchess of York, Adjoa Andoh, Elizabeth Hurley, Jodie Whittaker, Melanie C and Olivia Arben.

Preceded by John Knatchbull	Line of succession to the British throne descendant of Princess Alice of the United Kingdom, daughter of Queen Victoria	Succeeded by Timothy Knatchbull
