= The St. Regis Mexico City =

Skyscrapers in Mexico City

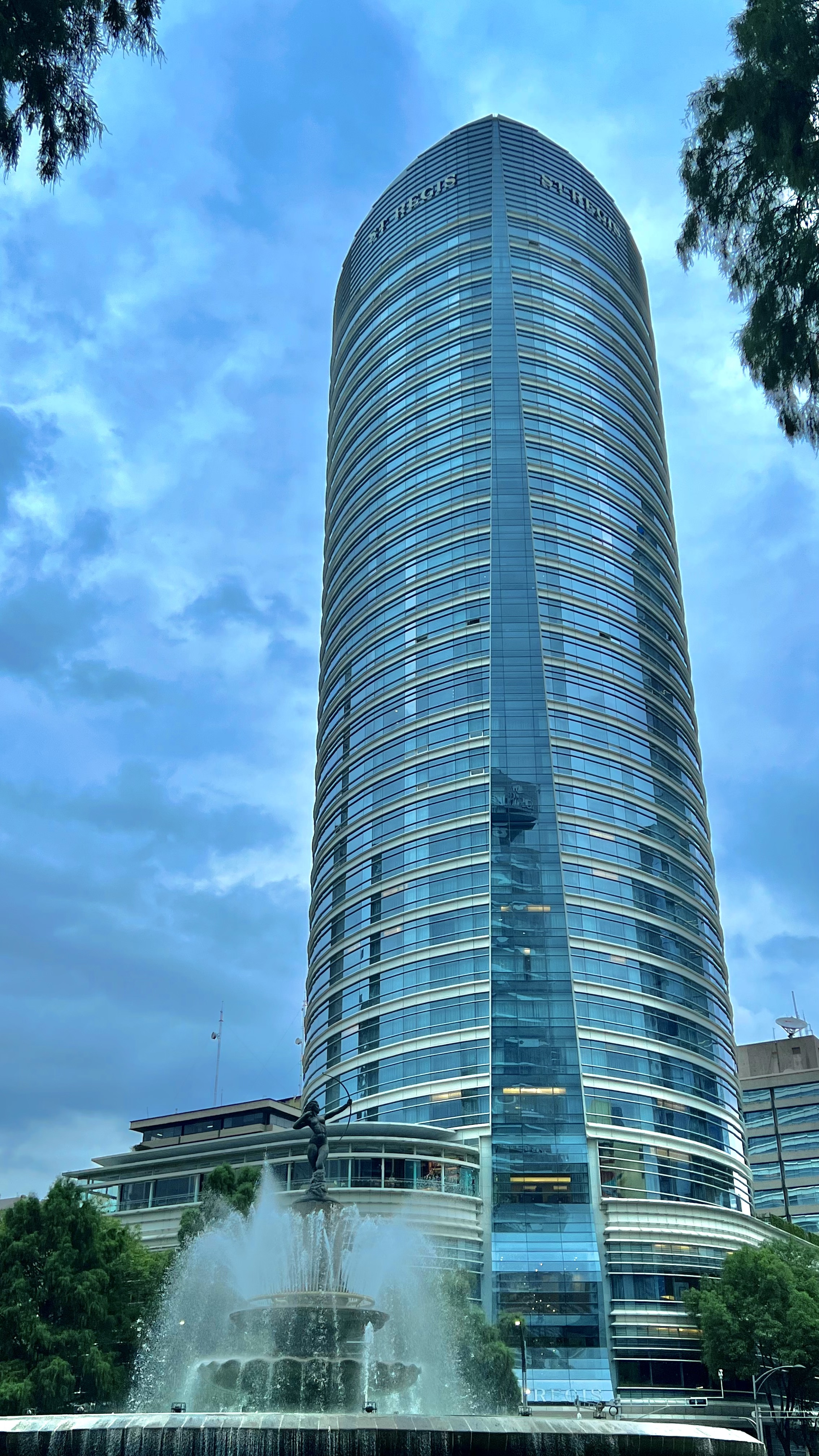
- The St. Regis Mexico City in 2022
- Interactive map of the The St. Regis Mexico City area
- Hotel chain: St. Regis Hotels & Resorts

General information
- Type: Mixed
- Location: Paseo de la Reforma #439; Colonia Cuauhtémoc; Mexico City
- Coordinates: 19°25′32.09″N 99°10′19.67″W
- Construction started: 2004
- Completed: 2008
- Management: Marriott International

Height
- Roof: 150.1 m (492 ft)
- Top floor: 144.5 m (474 ft)

Technical details
- Floor count: 32
- Floor area: 79,510 m^{2} (855,800 sq ft)
- Lifts/elevators: 15

Design and construction
- Architect: César Pelli

Website
- www.marriott.com/hotels/travel/mexxr-the-st-regis-mexico-city/

Freedom Tower (also called the St. Regis Hotel Tower) is a skyscraper located in front of the Diana Fountain roundabout at Paseo de la Reforma 439, Colonia, Cuauhtémoc, Delegación Cuauhtémoc in Mexico City. Its construction began in November 2004 and completed in January 2008. The tower started operating in June of that same year. The building has a commercial area on the first to third floor, and a seven-level underground parking garage with a capacity for 2,000 cars.

As of 2010, the Freedom Tower was the second tallest building in Paseo de la Reforma and the ninth tallest in Mexico City.

The tower consists of a hotel and various luxury residences. This is the first building belonging to the St. Regis Hotel & Residences in Latin America.

The architect of this skyscraper was the Argentinian Cesar Pelli, creator of the Petronas Towers in Kuala Lumpur - the highest building in the world until the year 2004. In Mexico City he previously designed the Twin Towers of Polanco called the Forest Residence 1, the Forest Residence 2, and the Coca-Cola Building in 1995.

== Form ==
The building reaches to 150.1 meters at its spiral. The height to the top floor is 138.3 meters, and up to the roof it reaches 144.5 meters. The building has 32 floors; the floor to ceiling height of each floor is four meters.

The building is equipped with 15 high speed elevators that move at a speed of 6.6 meters per second. In addition it has three pressurized emergency escalators, automatic units for air conditioning, and mechanical and electrical and facilities on each floor. Each floor has an average area of 1,750 to 1,825 square meters, free of columns. The total area of the building is 78.900 square meters. The site was formerly used as a public parking lot.

It is sometimes referred to as the vase building due to its construction and external appearance.

== Important Details ==
The initial project (and official name) is Freedom Tower, but it is now commonly known as the St. Regis Tower.

Because of the high seismic activity observed in Mexico city, prior to its construction, a highly advanced seismic engineering study was conducted. This allowed the designers to isolate it properly and protect the building from the common earthquakes that happen in the city. To do this, the structure is anchored to the surface of the earth and supported by 225 concrete piles, which penetrate to a depth of 55 meters passing the marshy land into firmer ground. The building is also equipped with 65 seismic shock absorbers. With this, it can withstand an earthquake up to 8.5 degrees on the Richter scale. On April 13, 2007, it withstood an earthquake of 6.3 on the Richter scale. Also, in June 2009 another one of 6.4 intensity on the Richter scale. The tower can also resist winds up to 257 kilometers per hour. The glass panes used to build it have a thickness of 2.3 centimeters.
