= Zhuhai Tower =

Supertall skyscraper in Zhuhai, Guangdong, China

- 珠海中心(Zhuhai Center)
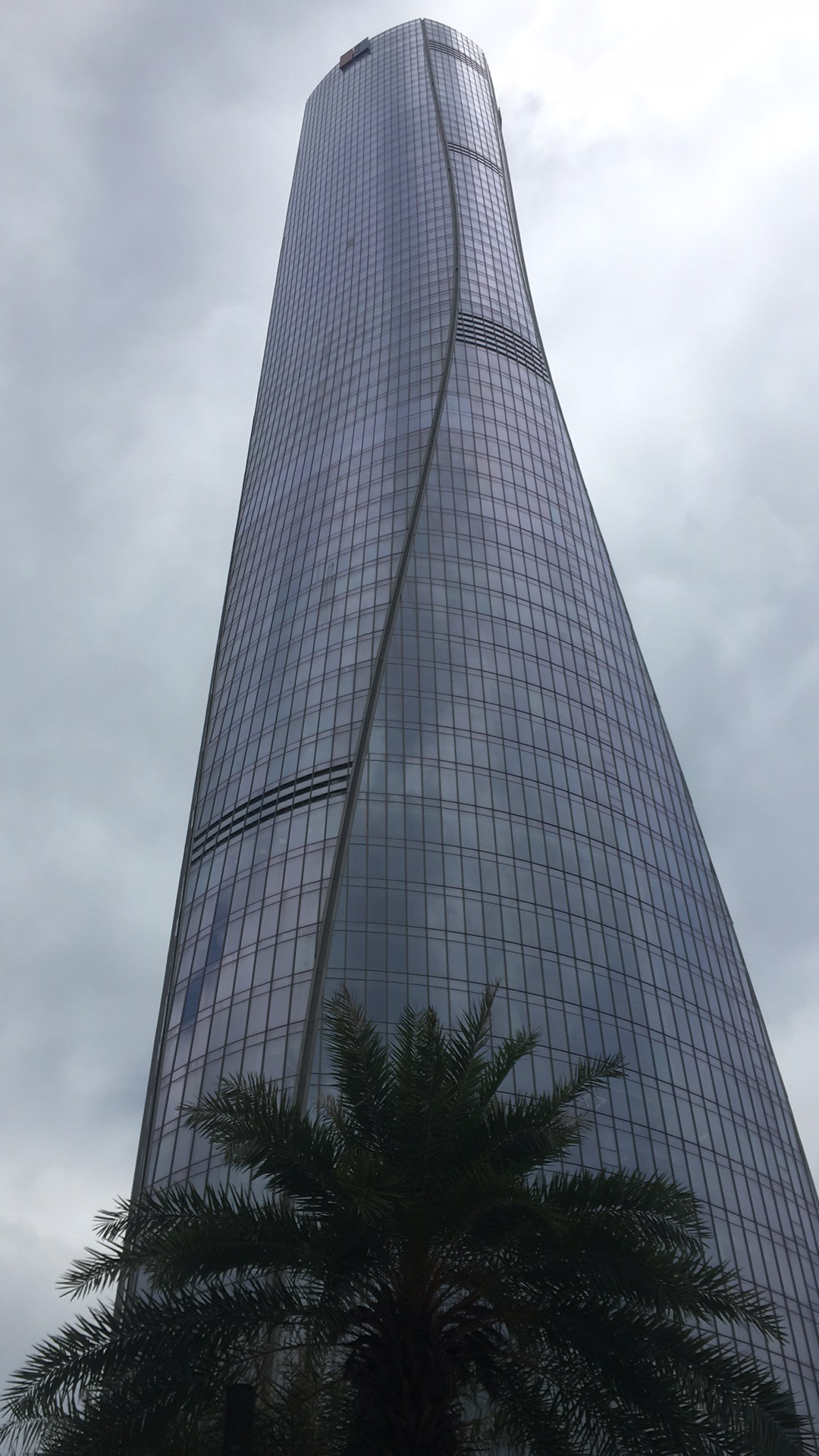
- Interactive map of the Zhuhai Tower area
- Hotel chain: St. Regis Hotels & Resorts

General information
- Status: Completed
- Location: Zhuhai, Guangdong, Yinwan Road, Wanzai Shizimen Central Business District, Hengqin, China
- Coordinates: 22.1744°N 113.5217°E
- Construction started: 2013
- Completed: 2017
- Opened: 2018
- Owner: Huafa Group
- Operator: Marriott International

Height
- Architectural: 330 metres (1,082.7 ft)
- Tip: 330 metres (1,082.7 ft)

Technical details
- Floor count: 67

Design and construction
- Architecture firm: RMJM

Zhuhai Tower
- Traditional Chinese: 珠海中心大廈
- Simplified Chinese: 珠海中心大厦
Transcriptions
Standard Mandarin
- Hanyu Pinyin: Zhūhǎi Zhōngxīn Dàshà
Yue: Cantonese
- Jyutping: zyu1 hoi2 zung1 sam1 daai6 haa6

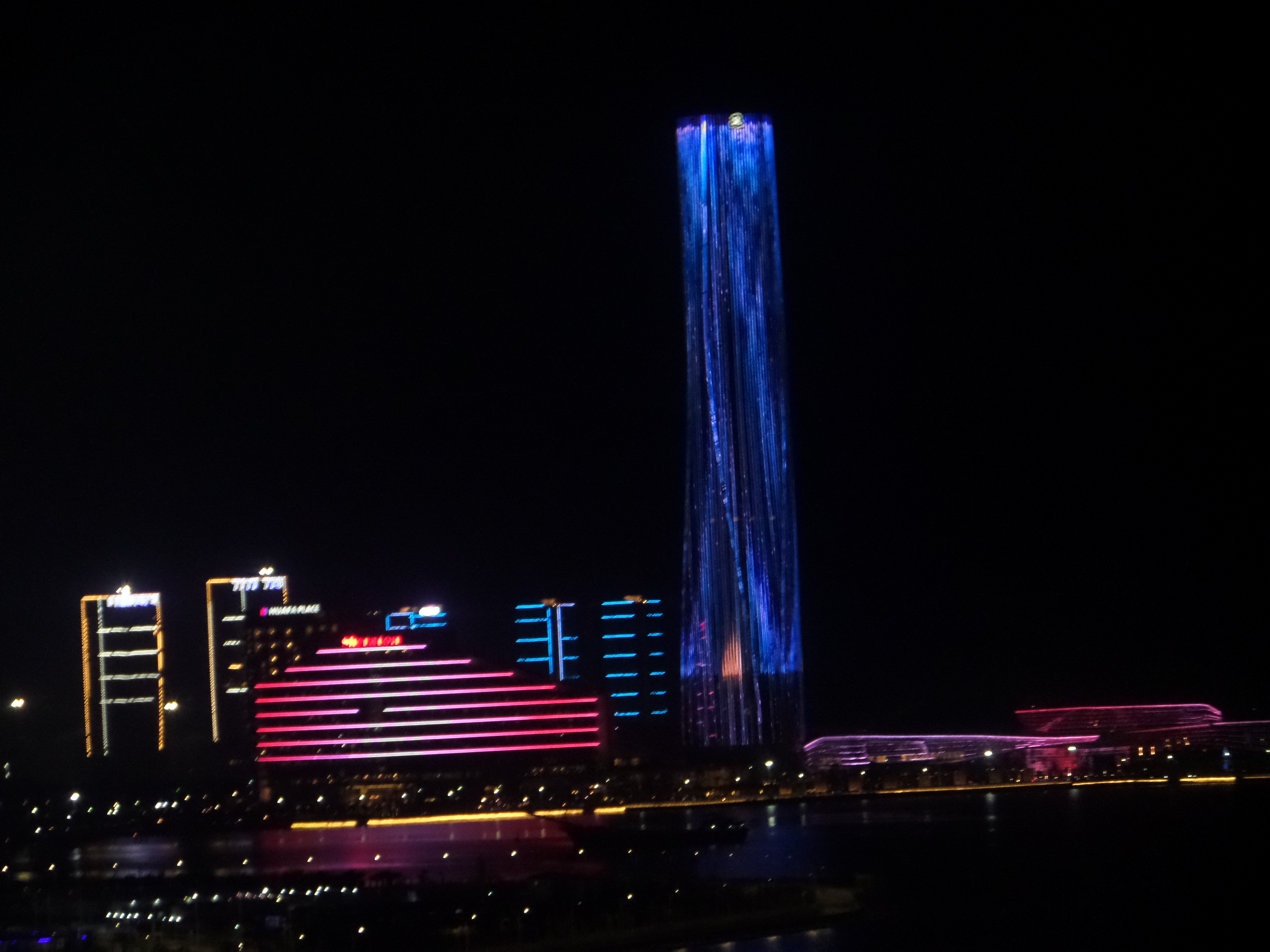

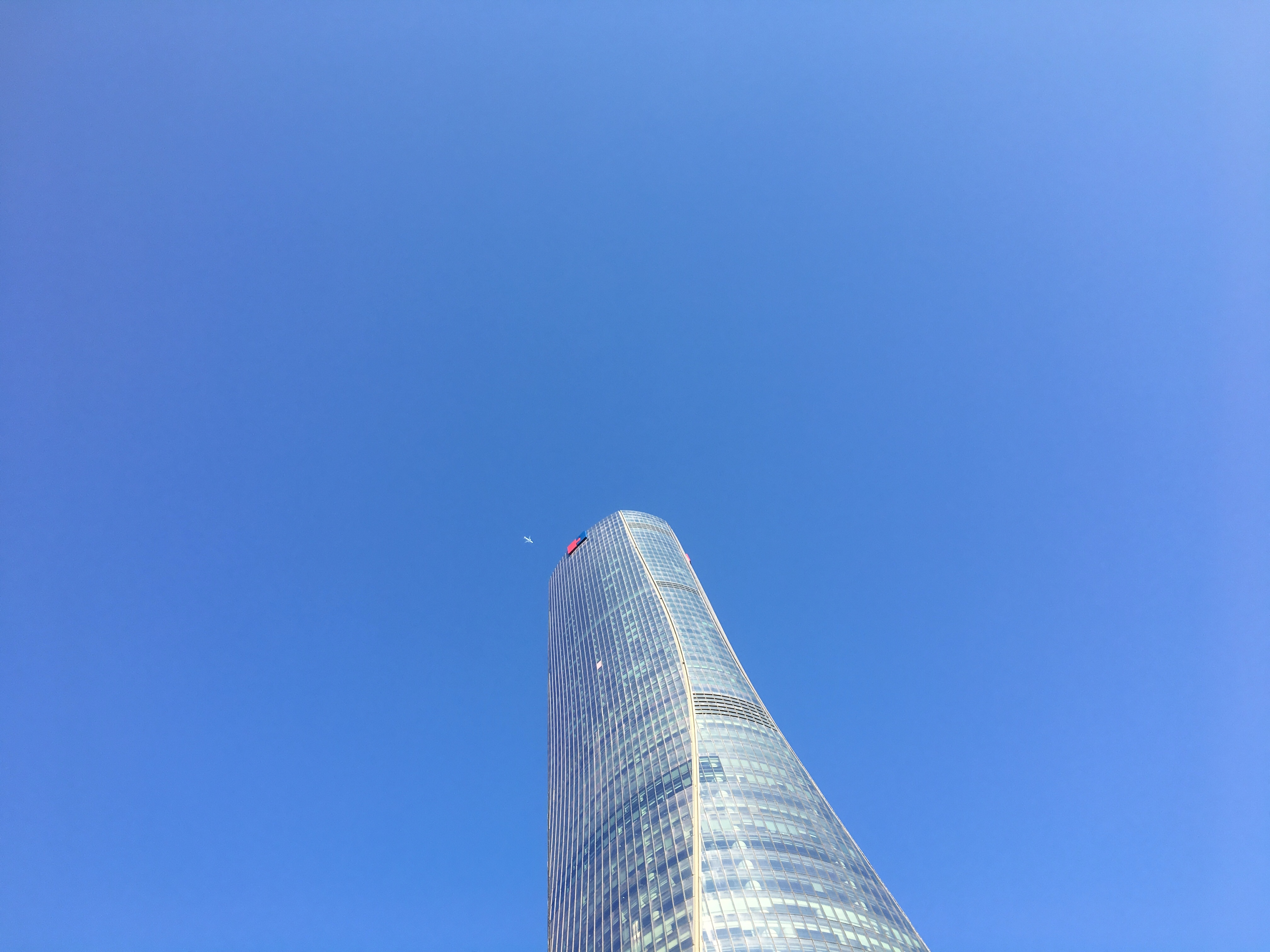
Zhuhai Tower

Zhuhai Tower is a 330-metre (1,082.7 ft) tall skyscraper in Zhuhai, Guangdong, China. It is ranked 74th on the list of tallest buildings in China.

Construction started in 2013 and was completed in 2017. It houses a St. Regis Hotels & Resorts-branded hotel, offices, and a convention center.
