= The St. Regis Hong Kong =

Luxury hotel in Hong Kong

- Chinese: 香港瑞吉酒店
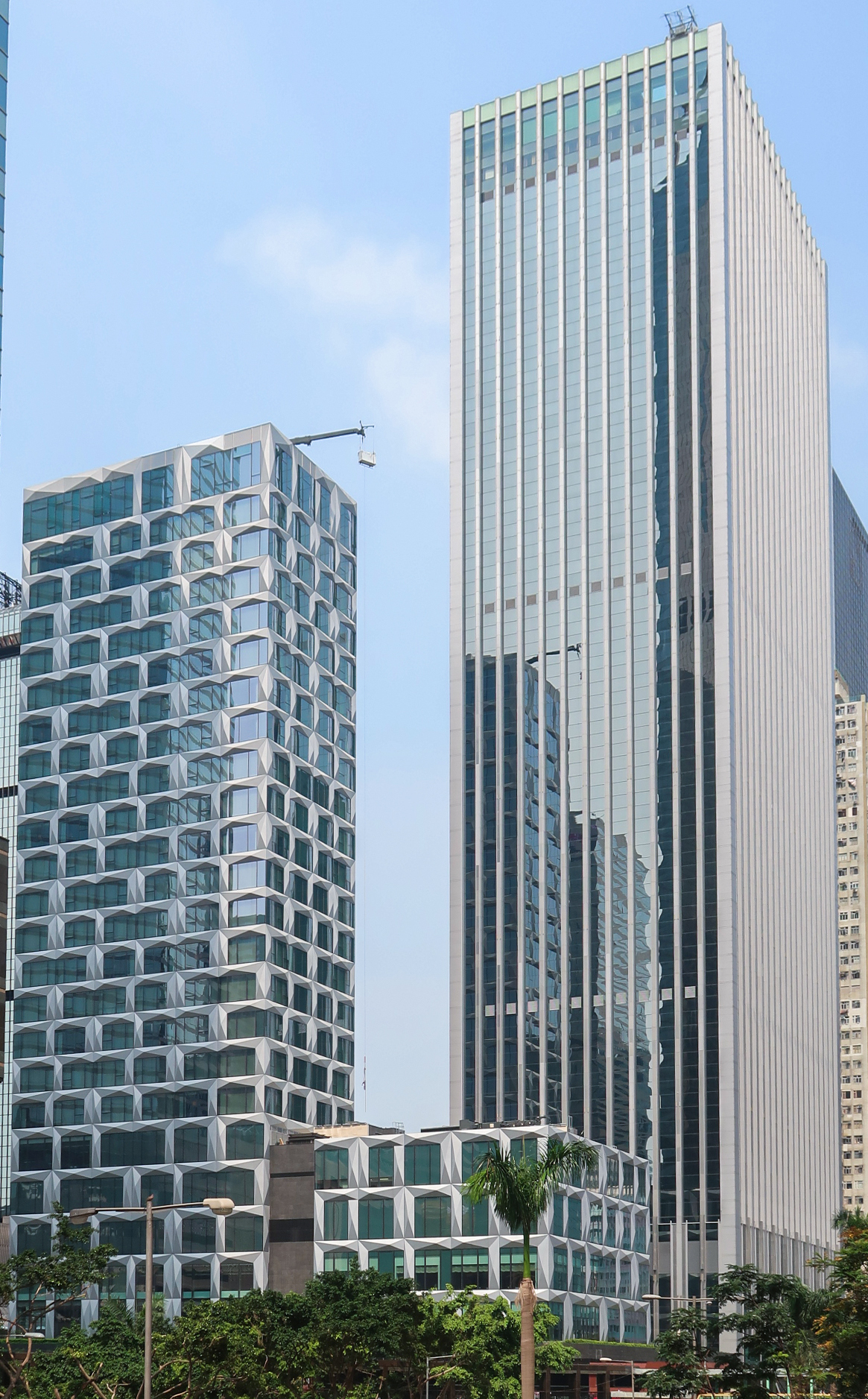
- The St. Regis Hong Kong (left) and China Resources Building (right)

- Location within Hong Kong urban core
- Hotel chain: St. Regis Hotels & Resorts

General information
- Location: Hong Kong, 1 Harbour Drive, Wan Chai
- Coordinates: 22°16′48.56″N 114°10′29.37″E
- Opening: 11 April 2019; 7 years ago
- Owner: Marriott International; China Resources
- Operator: Marriott International

Technical details
- Floor count: 27

Other information
- Number of rooms: 127
- Number of restaurants: 2

Website
- www.marriott.com/en-us/hotels/hkgxr-the-st-regis-hong-kong/overview

The St. Regis Hong Kong
- Traditional Chinese: 香港瑞吉酒店
Transcriptions
Yue: Cantonese
- Yale Romanization: Hēung góng seuih gāt jáu dim
- Jyutping: Hoeng^{1} gong^{2} seoi^{6} gat^{1} zau^{2} dim^{3}

The St. Regis Hong Kong is a five-star luxury hotel located in Wanchai, Hong Kong. It is part of the St. Regis Hotels & Resorts chain which is owned and managed by Marriott International.

== History ==
The hotel was a collaboration project between St. Regis Hotels & Resorts and China Resources Property. It was designed by André Fu who had previously worked on other luxury hotels such as Upper House Hong Kong and Kerry Hotel Hong Kong. According to Fu, it takes some cues from St. Regis New York. The hotel opened on 11 April 2019.

The hotel has two restaurants, French and Chinese which are led by Michelin star chefs. The French restaurant L’Envol is headed by Olivier Elzer.

== Gallery ==
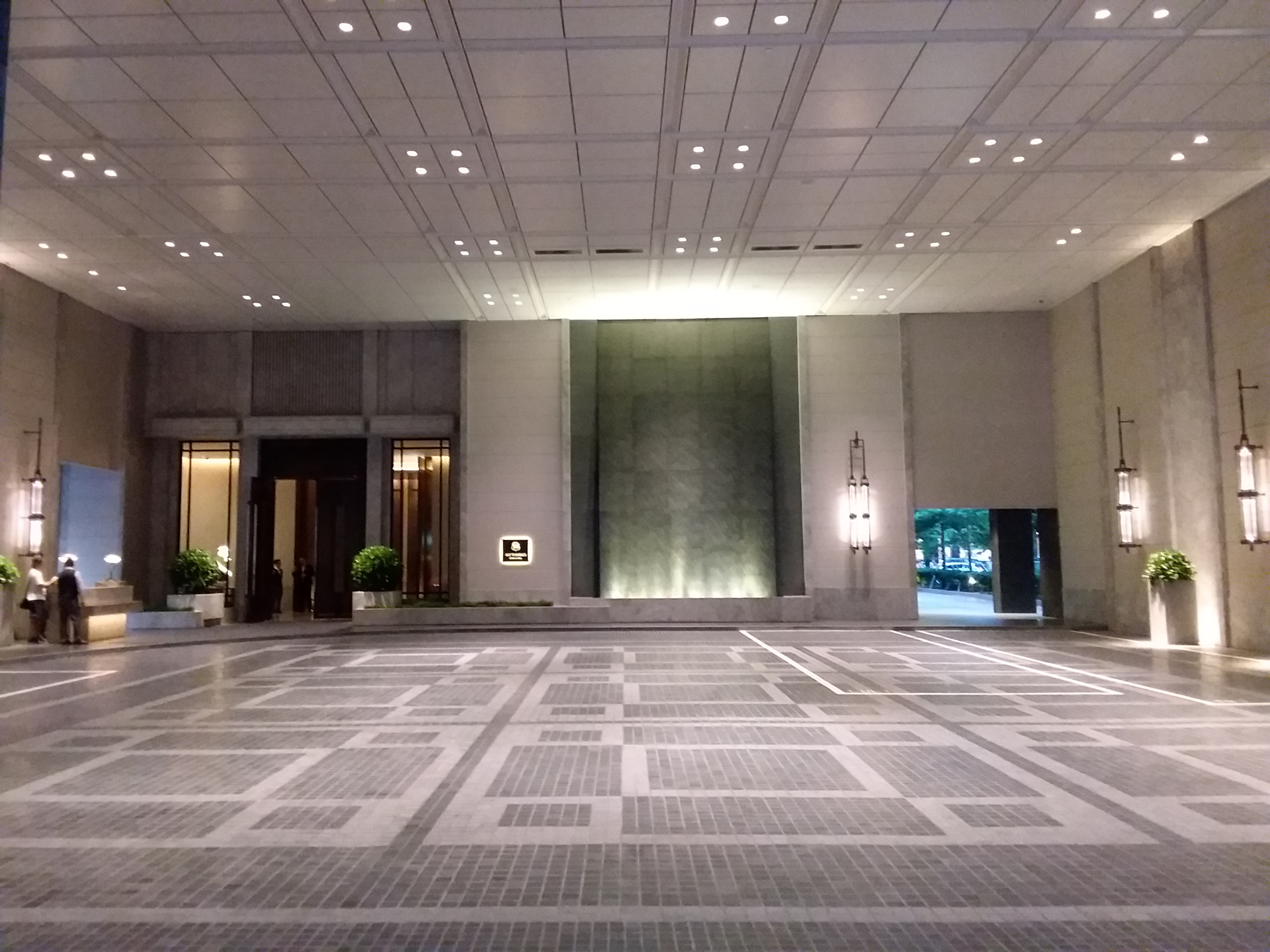
Entrance

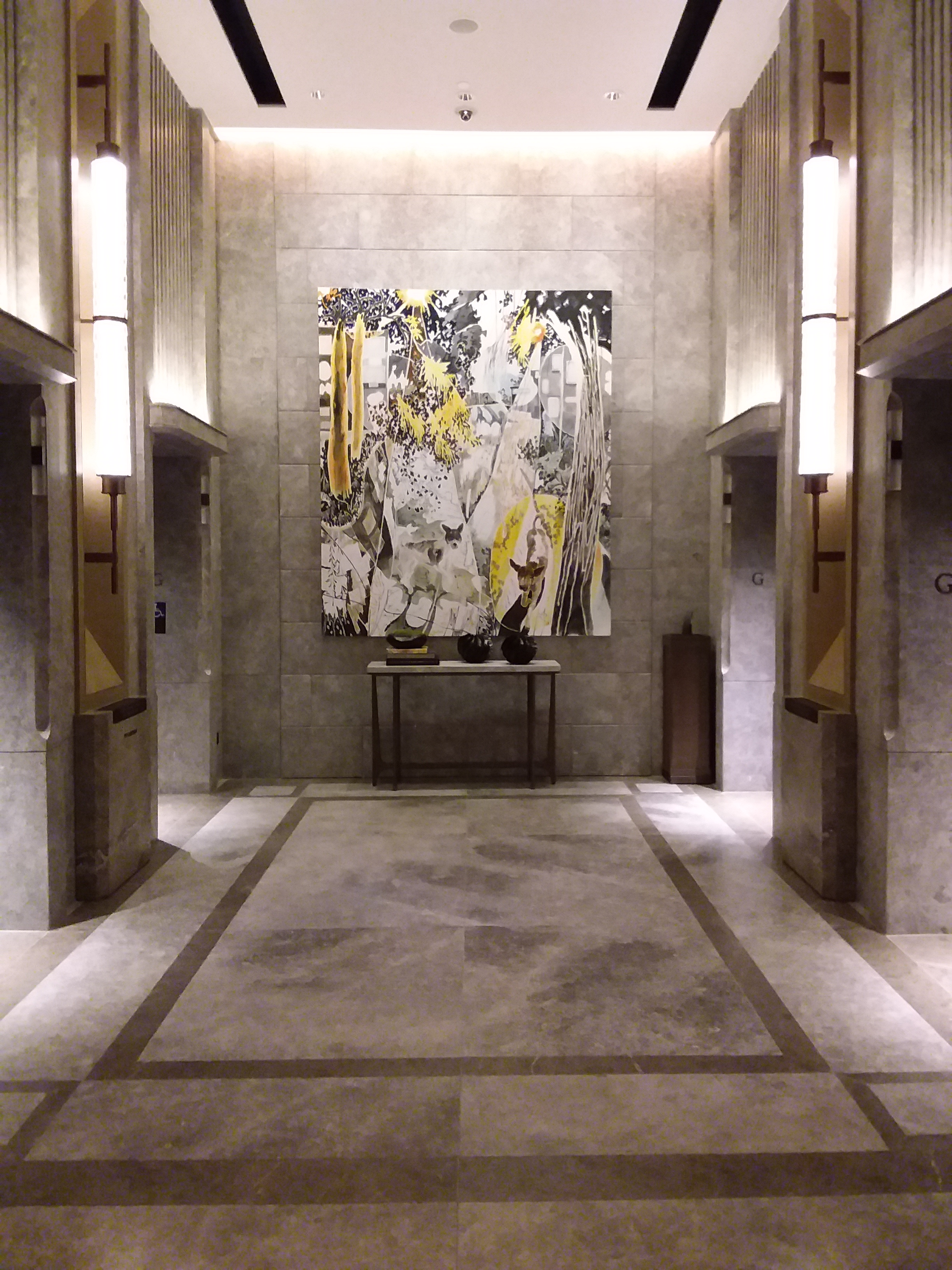
Lift lobby

== See also ==
- Grand Hyatt Hong Kong
