= Bad Apples (2025 film) =

2025 film by Jonatan Etzler

- British theatrical release poster
- Directed by: Jonatan Etzler
- Written by: Jess O'Kane
- Story by: Jonatan Etzler; Jess O'Kane
- Based on: De Oönskade by Rasmus Lindgren
- Produced by: Oskar Pimlott
- Starring: Saoirse Ronan; Eddie Waller; Jacob Anderson; Rakie Ayola; Robert Emms; Sean Gilder; Kerry Howard
- Cinematography: Nea Asphäll
- Edited by: Robert Krantz
- Music by: Chris Roe
- Production companies: HanWay Films; Vice Studios
- Distributed by: Republic Pictures
- Release dates: September 7, 2025 (TIFF); September 18, 2026 (United Kingdom and United States)
- Running time: 101 minutes
- Countries: United States; United Kingdom
- Language: English
- Box office: $2.3 million

Bad Apples is a 2025 dark comedy thriller film directed by Jonatan Etzler and written by Jess O'Kane, based on the 2020 novel De Oönskade by Rasmus Lindgren. It stars Saoirse Ronan, Eddie Waller, Nia Brown, Jacob Anderson, Rakie Ayola, Robert Emms, Sean Gilder, and Kerry Howard.

Bad Apples premiered in the United Kingdom and the United States on September 18, 2026. The film received positive reviews from critics.

== Plot ==
Maria Spencer is a Year 5 teacher at a primary school in Somerset, England. One of her students, Danny, perpetually disrupts her classes. Danny gets suspended after he pushes another pupil, the unsettling and sycophantic Pauline, down a flight of stairs, breaking her arm.

Maria visits Danny's father Josh, a delivery driver, who brushes off Maria's attempts to discuss about Danny. Maria finds Danny vandalizing cars, including her own, in a car park and, intervening, accidentally knocks him unconscious.

Maria drives Danny to a hospital, but when he threatens to report her for attacking him, despite her insistence that it was an accident, she panics and abruptly leaves with him, driving him to her house. Danny becomes destructive inside the house and enters the basement, where Maria locks him inside.

The next morning, Maria goes to work, and without Danny present, her class performs well during Ofsted inspections. Maria, in particular, receives praise for the improvement.

Maria continues to keep Danny confined. Discovering that he is unable to read and write, she begins tutoring him privately, furnishes the basement with video games and beanbag furniture, provides him with new clothes, and uses a harness, delivered by a distraught Josh, to keep him under control.

As time passes, Danny's academic abilities improve and the two form a somewhat amicable bond. Maria's class continues to thrive in his absence. Maria's professional success and new confidence also bring her closer to Sam, the school's deputy headteacher and her former romantic partner.

Meanwhile, Pauline becomes increasingly attached to Maria and turns up at her home. Discovering that Maria is holding Danny there, she does not report her, but leverages her knowledge of the secret to obtain special treatment from Maria and gain access to the basement, where she delights in holding power over Maria and bullying Danny.

On one occasion at Maria's house, Pauline goes too far, demanding Danny's gaming system and insulting Danny, telling him no one misses him. As a result, Danny attacks Pauline, with Maria facilitating by stepping out of the basement and locking the door to give him more time. Eventually released, Pauline flees the house. Knowing Pauline will report everything, Maria promises Danny that she will release him from the basement if he agrees to pretend he's been camping out in the woods and contradict Pauline's story and leaves him to prepare a bag while she attends the parents' evening.

At the parents' evening, where it is announced that Josh has been arrested due to suspicion in Danny's disappearance, Pauline interrupts the proceedings with a performance that reveals Maria is keeping Danny in her basement. Maria breaks down and admits the truth. The parents decide not to report Maria, as their children and the school have improved since Danny disappeared, and begin bringing food for Danny to ensure that their children's progress continues.

Sylvia, the headteacher, resigns over the incident, making Sam the new headteacher. Maria returns home and tells Danny that he will never be released from the basement.

Months pass, and Maria is honored at a large school assembly for her success as a teacher. The school announces a scholarship in honor of the still-missing Danny. Using an electric toothbrush, Danny gradually digs through the wall of the basement and escapes. The film ends with Danny running freely alongside a road.

== Cast ==
- Saoirse Ronan as Maria Spencer
- Eddie Waller as Danny
- Nia Brown as Pauline
- Jacob Anderson as Sam
- Rakie Ayola as Sylvia
- Robert Emms as Josh
- Sean Gilder as Frank
- Kerry Howard as PC Williams
- Euan Shanahan as PC Chadwick
- Jaye Jacobs as Khaliya's Mum

== Production ==
Bad Apples is written by Jess O'Kane and adapted from the Swedish-language debut novel De Oönskade by Rasmus Lindgren, with Swedish director Jonatan Etzler making his English-language debut after his 2023 debut film One More Time for Netflix. The film was produced by Oskar Pimlott for Pulse Films and executive produced by Judy Counihan and Jamie Hall for Pulse Films, Philip Knatchbull, Marc Smit, Paul Wiegard and Kristian Brodie for CCM, and Paul Grindey and Charles Moore for Viewfinder Film and was developed in a partnership with the Curzon CM Development Fund. Etzler, who had been a teacher himself, said that he was "really struck" with the moral dilemma of the novel while reading it and wanted to adapt it as a film. His agent then found a producer interested who suggested screenwriter Jess O'Kane, who also similarly was a teacher herself. Etzler said that he exchanged the novel's Swedish setting for Southern England because he thought that the school systems of Sweden and the United Kingdom were similarly dysfunctional and because the two countries shared a similar dark sense of humor.

Saoirse Ronan signed on to lead the cast in October 2023. According to Etzler, Ronan was the only actor he had in mind for the role and identified her as "sympathetic as a person" and "one of the greatest actors of her generation". After having been sent for, Ronan quickly responded within a week with Etzler saying that she was "keen on doing it because it’s not her usual character to play. She’s been playing a lot of good-hearted people. I think she was very keen on playing an unsympathetic character." Co-star Eddie Waller from Northern England had no prior acting experience before he had been discovered by casting director Fiona Weir.

Principal photography took place in Bristol and the surrounding areas, beginning on March 19, 2024, and took 32 days. The film was shot on location in a real school in Bath on the site of the now set to be demolished Culverhay Secondary School. The film used teacher consultants and the basement was a studio set designed by production designer Jacqueline Abrahams. Director of photography was Nea Harnebrandt Asphäll, and the film was edited by Robert Krantz with music by Chris Roe.

== Release ==
In June 2024, Paramount Pictures' Republic Pictures label acquired the distribution rights to the film.

Bad Apples premiered at the 2025 Toronto International Film Festival on September 7, 2025. It also opened the San Sebastián International Film Festival that same month, competing in the "New Directors" competition, and was also selected for the "Official Competition" section of the 2025 BFI London Film Festival for the best film award and have a screening on October 9, 2025. The film released theatrically in the United Kingdom, Ireland, and United States on September 18, 2026. In Italy, and Germany it was released theatrically on September 10, 2026. In Spain, it was released the following day. An official trailer was released on July 9, 2026.

== Reception ==
=== Critical response ===
On the review aggregator website Rotten Tomatoes, 83% of 72 critics' reviews are positive. The website’s consensus reads: "A tart comedy that Saoirse Ronan's terrific performance polishes into something humane, Bad Apples has an unsettling darkness that worms its way through an otherwise playful satire of the education system." Metacritic, which uses a weighted average, assigned the film a score of 63 out of 100 based on 16 critics, indicating "generally favorable" reviews.

Pete Hammond for Deadline gave the film a favorable review and wrote that it took him a while to realize that the film was "really a very, very dark comedy." Hammond especially praised Ronan and Waller's acting and the role of Nia Brown as Pauline. Leslie Felperin for The Hollywood Reporter identified the film as "a black comedy that’s more of a charcoal than a true, pitch-dark Vantablack". Guy Lodge for Variety criticized the film's adult side characters as handled "altogether less believably, albeit not without stabs of cynical truth" and the film's title giving "bad apples" metaphor as "overegged".

=== Accolades ===
Organization	Year	Category	Nominee(s)	Result	Ref.
San Sebastián International Film Festival	27 September 2025	New Directors Award	Jonatan Etzler	Nominated	
BFI London Film Festival	19 October 2025	Best Film	Bad Apples	Nominated	
British Independent Film Awards	6 December 2026	Best Debut Screenwriter	Jess O'Kane	Pending	
British Independent Film Awards	6 December 2026	Breakthrough Producer	Oskar Pimlott	Pending	
