= Daniel Battsek =

British film producer

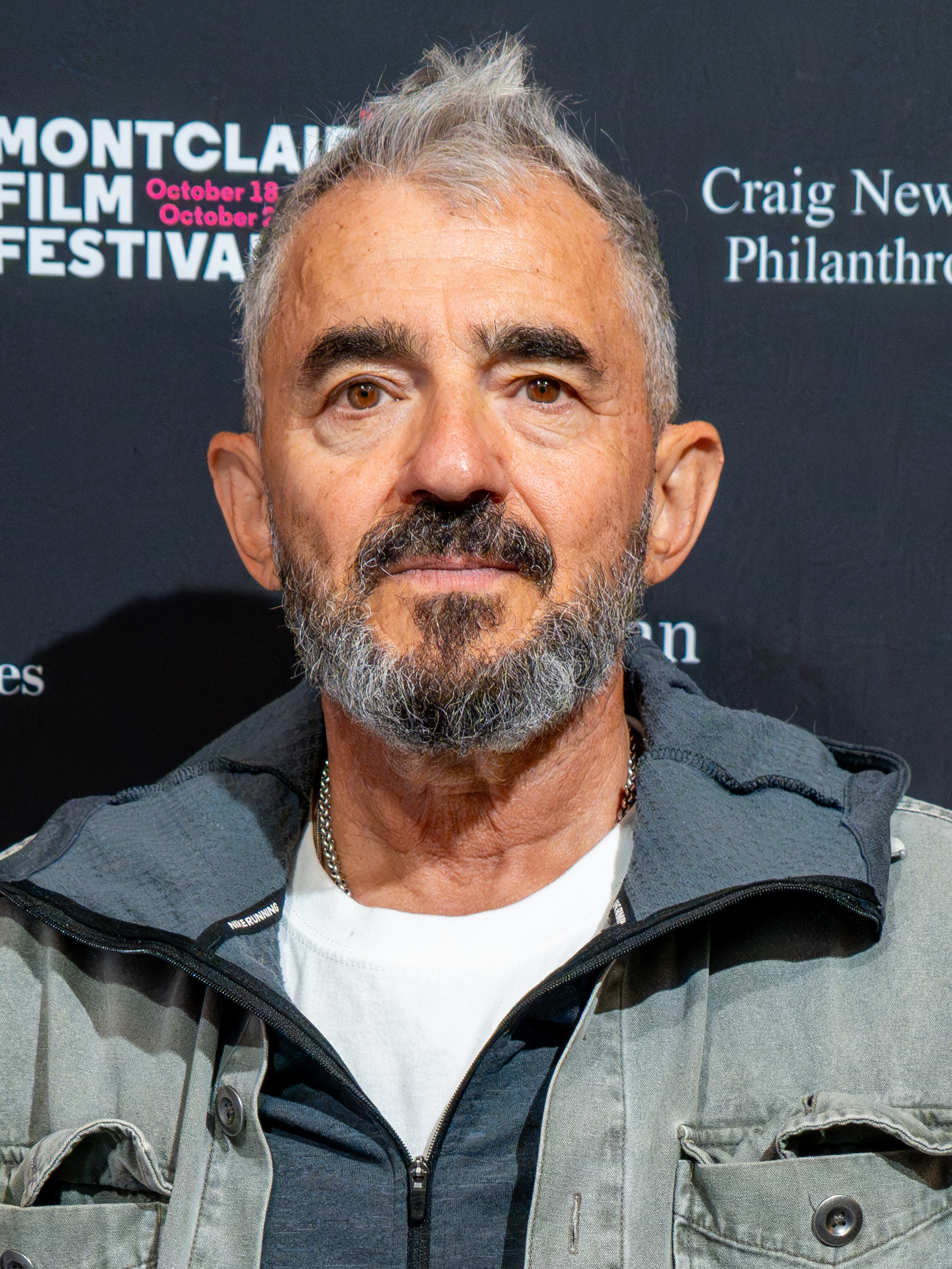
- Battsek in 2024
- Born: 1958 (age 67–68)
- Education: Oxford Brookes University
- Occupations: film producer and executive
- Title: President, Film at Lincoln Center

Daniel Battsek (born in 1958) is an English film producer and executive, and the current President of Film at Lincoln Center. Previously, he was director of Film4, president of Cohen Media Group, Miramax Films, and National Geographic Films.

== Life and career ==
Battsek is a graduate of Oxford Brookes University where he majored in social and political studies.

Battsek began his industry career at The Hoyts Film Corporation in Sydney, where he quickly rose through the ranks to general manager in Victoria State, overseeing distribution. Between 1985 and 1991, Battsek was managing director of Palace Pictures, where he was responsible for the acquisition and distribution of quality independent titles from around the world for release in the UK.

In 1991, Battsek went to work for Disney, where he was asked to start up a UK Company as part of the worldwide distribution network for Buena Vista International. As EVP and Managing Director, he oversaw all aspects of UK distribution for 18–25 releases per annum from Walt Disney Studios and their partners, including Pixar and Miramax Films. His responsibilities also included involvement in the acquisition of distribution rights across numerous territories for such films as Muriel's Wedding, Shine, Central Station, Kolya, and Ice Storm.

In 1998, Battsek was promoted to senior vice president at BVI (UK) Limited, where he oversaw approximately 35 films per year from the Disney, Touchstone, and Miramax labels. With his expanding role, Battsek began acquiring and developing British film projects for worldwide distribution. He created the BVI UK Comedy Label in 2001, which produced four films: High Heels and Low Lifes, Hope Springs, Calendar Girls, and Kinky Boots.

In 2005, Battsek became President of Miramax Films, after Harvey Weinstein and Bob Weinstein left the company. Projects that Battsek greenlit and/or acquired whilst at Miramax included Oscar winners The Queen, No Country for Old Men, and There Will Be Blood, along with Oscar nominees The Diving Bell and the Butterfly, and Happy-Go-Lucky.

In 2010, Battsek was announced as President of National Geographic Films, replacing Adam Leipzig. During Battsek's time at National Geographic Films, he acquired projects for development and production, operated a boutique theatrical distribution arm for art-house titles and documentaries, including the Oscar-nominated Restrepo, and oversaw National Geographic large-screen and IMAX projects.

Battsek joined Cohen Media Group in 2012 as President. working alongside CMG Chairman and CEO Charles S. Cohen in acquiring, producing, and distributing top-tier films in a wide range of genres. Battsek helped make the company North America's premier independent theatrical and digital distributor of contemporary art-house and foreign films. He also helped oversee CMG's Cohen Film Collection, a library of some 700 cinema classics being restored for theatrical and Blu-ray release. Releases included festival-winning favorites Mustang and Rams, along with the Kent Jones documentary Hitchcock/Truffaut, the 2015 Academy Award Best Foreign Language Film nominee Timbuktu by Abderrahmane Sissako, and My Old Lady, with Maggie Smith and Kevin Kline.

Battsek joined Film4 as Director in 2016. At Film4, Battsek greenlit films including Yorgos Lanthimos' The Favourite, Fighting with My Family from writer/director Stephen Merchant, Bart Layton's American Animals, The Festival from the makers of The Inbetweeners, Lenny Abrahamson's The Little Stranger, and Rungano Nyoni's BAFTA-winning I Am Not a Witch, as well as acquiring the rights to Booker Prize–winning author Graham Swift's novel Mothering Sunday for development with Number 9 Films. Battsek also brought to Film4 John Williams' novel Stoner, a co-production development he initiated in his previous post at Cohen Media Group. Battsek enjoyed a successful awards season as Executive Producer on Golden Globe, BAFTA, and Oscar–winning Three Billboards Outside Ebbing, Missouri, a film written and directed by Martin McDonagh, starring Frances McDormand, Sam Rockwell, and Woody Harrelson.

In May 2025, Battsek was appointed President of Film at Lincoln Center, a nonprofit organization dedicated to the art of cinema and home to the New York Film Festival.
