= Carolyn Cowan =

British artist and therapist (born 1960)

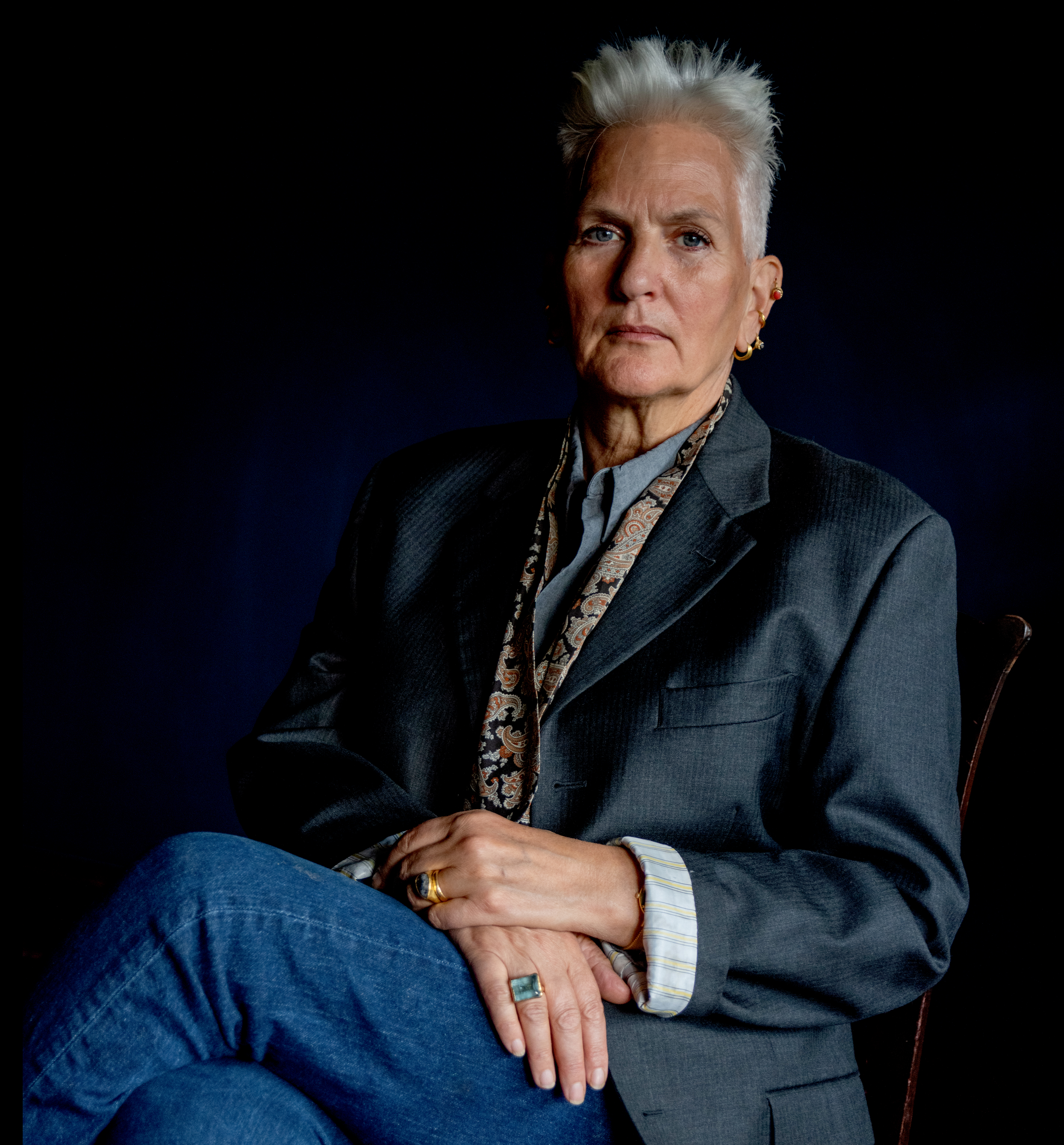
- Carolyn Cowan in 2020
- Born: 1960 (age 65–66); London, England
- Known for: Therapist, make-up artist, photographer, teacher and body painter
- Website: carolyncowan.com

Carolyn Cowan (born 1960) is a London-based author and trauma therapist who also teaches and trains others in yoga and breathwork. Prior to her career as a therapist, she was a fashion designer and photographer. During the 1980s, she earned acclaim as a makeup artist in the pop music video industry. She taught body painting at the University of the Arts London for over 20 years. Most recently (2025) Carolyn published her second book, Shame: The Path Out of Hell. In 2019 Carolyn also founded and launched a new form of yoga, Kundalini Global, in answer to the rapidly growing and profound need for yoga to become more inclusive and serve a wider demographic.

== Early years ==
Cowan was born in 1960, the eldest of three children of fashion photographer John Cowan and Syddy Cooper. She grew up in Chelsea, London and was exposed to fashion at a young age, often posing as a child model for her father. In 1964, her parents divorced and her mother eventually married a broker at Lloyd's who took care of the family financially. Cowan has said that the loss of her father led to depression and eventually contributed to substance abuse.

During that period, John Cowan leased his studio at 39 Princes Place to Michelangelo Antonioni for interior and exterior filming of the film Blowup. His photographic murals are featured in the film. He also shot the title stills for 2001 A Space Odyssey.

From age 11 to 16, Cowan attended a Catholic boarding school, which she has called "a horrible experience," due to the abusive staff. During that time, she would often escape to the city to take art courses at the Victoria and Albert Museum as a way "to get out of school." When she was 16, she left school and moved to London with her then-boyfriend, music composer Hans Zimmer.

== Early professional life ==
While in her early 20s, Cowan met members of the Italian group Krisma, a new wave band formed in 1976 with Maurizio Arcieri and Christina Moser. The lead singer of the band, Moser, allowed Cowan to paint her face for shows. Soon Cowan was doing body painting and wanted to become a makeup artist.

When she was 22, she sold her clothes to buy a train ticket to Milan to pursue a career in fashion. Her first job was working for Italian Vogue.

She returned to England and worked in the pop music video industry. She would eventually work with such personalities as Bryan Ferry, David Bowie and Freddie Mercury, who were part of the booming 1980s video music industry. She also worked with singer Steve Strange.

== Photography ==
During the early 1990s, Cowan began a career as a photographer. Among her first jobs was an Ilford Photo-sponsored trip to India to photograph nomads. While there, she was exposed to Hindu spirituality and Sikhism, which would later fuel her passion for yoga and meditation. "I preferred this idea of choosing your experiences and transformation, that you can have all your past and drama and that could be your mountain on which you stand. Like the root of a tree that you become."

Cowan has been acclaimed for her photography, which includes nudes and family portraits. “Today we are so defined by the exterior, labels and what we wear. Clothes hide and mask who we really are. But if you take it away we are nothing else but ourselves. I am fascinated by bodies, regardless one being skinny, not skinny, fat, obese, wrinkled, aged or young. There is beauty in absolutely everything, even in a nude body, which is not perfect as none of us are. There is beauty in human vulnerability."

In her photography, Cowan said she strives to show the "magical spark" inside her subjects. "When I take a picture of someone it is always about redemption, a way of liberation if you prefer."

== Psychosexual, Author and Yoga Trainer ==
Cowan’s professional life is now largely focused on her work as a psychotherapist and author. She is accredited with the National Counselling and Psychotherapy Society (NCPS). She works in all manners of addictive behaviours and sexual dysfunction, including working with same-sex couples, pre- and post-natal relationships, and sexual issues.

Cowan is one of a growing number of psychotherapists who do not believe in the traditional concept of sexual addiction. Going against current assumptions and trends, she debunks the idea that sex addiction is real. Instead, she says, the current concept of "sex addiction" is a belief system, supported by faith, moral conviction and religious principles, that represents an attack on sexuality and its expression. It was originally devised, as a system, in the 1980s during the AIDS crisis, and does not support recovery from trauma, an abusive background, mental illness, etc. in its concepts and applications, she says. Cowan believes that labeling behaviors as sex addiction asserts a false, dangerous myth that undermines personal responsibility.

Cowan is also an international Kundalini yoga teacher. She said she discovered yoga in India and is heavily inspired by Hindu spirituality. During an interview with British Vogue, Cowan said, "yoga builds confidence, connections and friendships. It eases loneliness, gives you faith in yourself. By attending a regular class, you join a community and a worldwide tribe; with yoga as a part of your focus you can go on to train as a teacher, empowering yourself and changing the lives of others."

In 2019, she was named among the top 16 yoga teachers in London.

In addition to her therapy practice, she also provides training for the treatment of drug and alcohol addiction as well as sexual compulsion, compulsive porn, shopping, gambling and cutting through her Mastering the Addictive Personality Teacher Training course, which certifies the practitioner to work in prisons and rehab centers. Cowan explores addiction and anxiety through the lens of trauma, shame and abuse rather than the widely accepted 12-step disease model. Her other workshops focus on topics such as breathwork, shame, the anatomy of posture and hormones, female arousal and menopause.

Cowan has produced numerous DVDs about vegetarian cooking, conscious pregnancy, overcoming addictive personalities and the art of meditation. She was also a contributor for TabooZapp, an app that is designed to support mental health, identity, well-being and confidence in youth. She is currently preparing to self publish a new book on Kundalini Global.

She has contributed her expertise to a variety of magazines and digital outlets including The Guardian, Cosmopolitan Magazine, Glamour Magazine, Psychologies, Women’s Health, The Sun (United Kingdom), i news, Natural Health Magazine, and Woman’s Own. She has also written feature articles in Planet Mindful and Yoga magazines about Kundalini yoga and menopause. In November 2023, Cowan’s first book Breathing for Pregnancy was published by Vermillion, an imprint of Penguin Random House in the UK. Cowan’s second book, Shame: The Path Out of Hell, was published in June 2025.

== Kundalini Global ==
In 2019, Carolyn founded Kundalini Global in answer to the rapidly growing demand for yoga to become more inclusive and serve a wider demographic, and after she stepped away from Kundalini yoga as taught by Yogi Bhajan in 2014. As well as teaching Kundalini Global classes, in 2020 Carolyn began offering Kundalini Global teacher training. Kundalini Global and its teachers adhere to the view that yoga has the power to deal with anxiety, depression, low self-esteem, negative history and physical responses to trauma in the body. In 2021, Carolyn further launched a Kundalini Global pregnancy yoga teacher training. Having worked with the issues that can occur in these experiences for over 30 years in a number of ways, in her work as a therapist, and previous role as a Doula, pregnancy yoga teacher and a pregnancy teacher trainer, Carolyn explores pregnancy yoga and breathwork through a radical and inclusive lens.

== Personal life ==
Cowan lives in South London and has two children, Louis and Isadora.

== Acclaim ==
=== Exhibitions and shows ===
- (1996) Indian High Commission
- (1997) Egg
- (1998) Horniman Museum
- (1998) The Sun and Doves
- (1999) Bhuj Museum, India
- (2010) Lingering Whispers
- (2011) City of Women – Slovenia
- (2012) WeDo Gallery, Bangkok
- (2015) Taylor Wessing Photographic Prize, National Portrait Gallery, London
