= St. Regis Hotels & Resorts =

Luxury hotel chain

- Type: Division
- Industry: Hospitality
- Founded: 1998; 28 years ago in White Plains, New York, U.S.
- Founder: John Jacob Astor (1904)
- Headquarters: Bethesda, Maryland, U.S.
- Number of locations: 60+ (December 2025)
- Areas served: Worldwide
- Parent: Marriott International
- Website: st-regis.marriott.com

St. Regis Hotels & Resorts (/seɪnt ˈriːdʒɪs/) is an American multinational chain of luxury hotels. It is owned and managed by Marriott International.

== History ==
=== Origins ===
In 1904, John Jacob Astor built the St. Regis New York as a sister property to his part-owned Waldorf-Astoria Hotel. Exhibiting luxury and technological advance, each room had its own telephone. Ownership changes, a new wing, and restorations occurred over the following decades. In 1966, Sheraton Hotels purchased the property. After an extensive restoration in 1991, the hotel became the flagship for the Sheraton premier hotels rebranded as the ITT Sheraton Luxury Collection.

=== Modern brand ===
In 1997, Starwood Hotels and Resorts acquired Sheraton from ITT.

The St. Regis brand was launched in 1998, when Starwood rebranded a former Ritz-Carlton property it had bought in Aspen, Colorado as The St. Regis Aspen. In 1999, Starwood rebranded the Carlton Hotel in Washington, D.C. and two more former Ritz-Carlton properties in Houston and Philadelphia as St. Regis hotels.

In September 2016, Marriott gained the St. Regis chain as part of its acquisition of Starwood.

In January 2018, SolidBlock created a smart contract and digitized platform for the tokenization of The St. Regis Aspen, which became the first private single asset real estate investment trust (REIT) in the US to issue a Security Token Offering and traded on the blockchain. Through an intensive campaign, $18 million was raised - nearly one-fifth of the equity deal sold through digital tokens to investors worldwide.

== Accommodations ==
		North America	Europe	Middle E. & Africa	Asia & Pacific	Caribbean Latin Am.	Total
2016	Properties	10	5	5	15	3	38
2016	Rooms	1,963	720	1,402	3,639	448	8,172
2017	Properties	11	6	6	17	3	43
2017	Rooms	2,228	839	1,562	4,359	448	9,436
2018	Properties	10	6	4	18	3	41
2018	Rooms	1,977	834	1,168	4,612	448	9,039
2019	Properties	10	7	5	20	3	45
2019	Rooms	1,968	1,002	1,426	4,812	448	9,656
2020	Properties	10	7	6	20	3	46
2020	Rooms	1,968	1,002	1,788	4,811	448	10,017
2021	Properties	10	6	9	21	4	50
2021	Rooms	1,968	883	2,755	5,044	568	11,218
2022	Properties	10	5	11	23	4	53
2022	Rooms	1,977	668	3,049	5,530	569	11,793
2023	Properties	11	6	13	23	5	58
2023	Rooms	2,169	768	3,222	5,530	693	12,382

== Locations ==
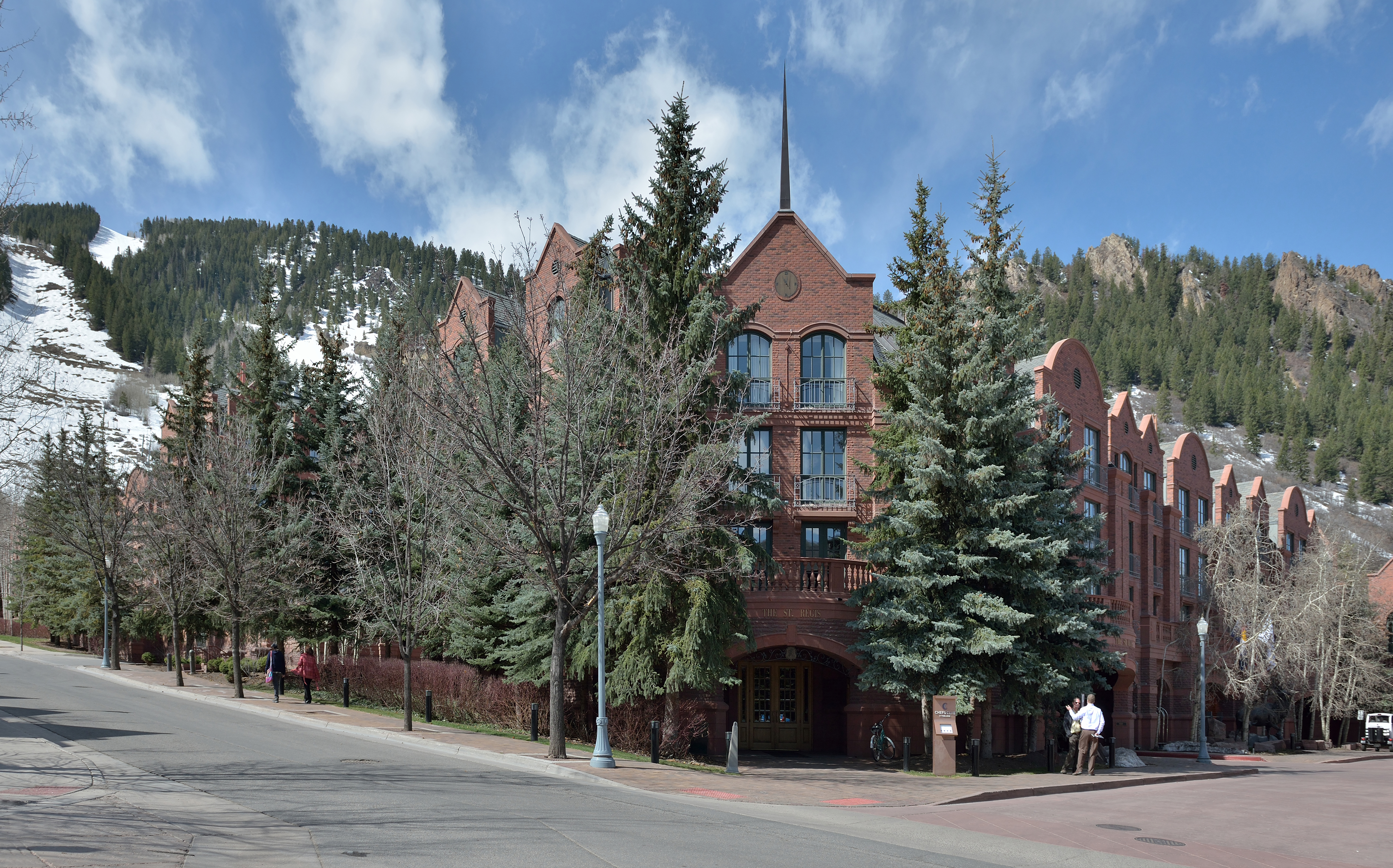
The St. Regis Aspen, first hotel in the modern chain

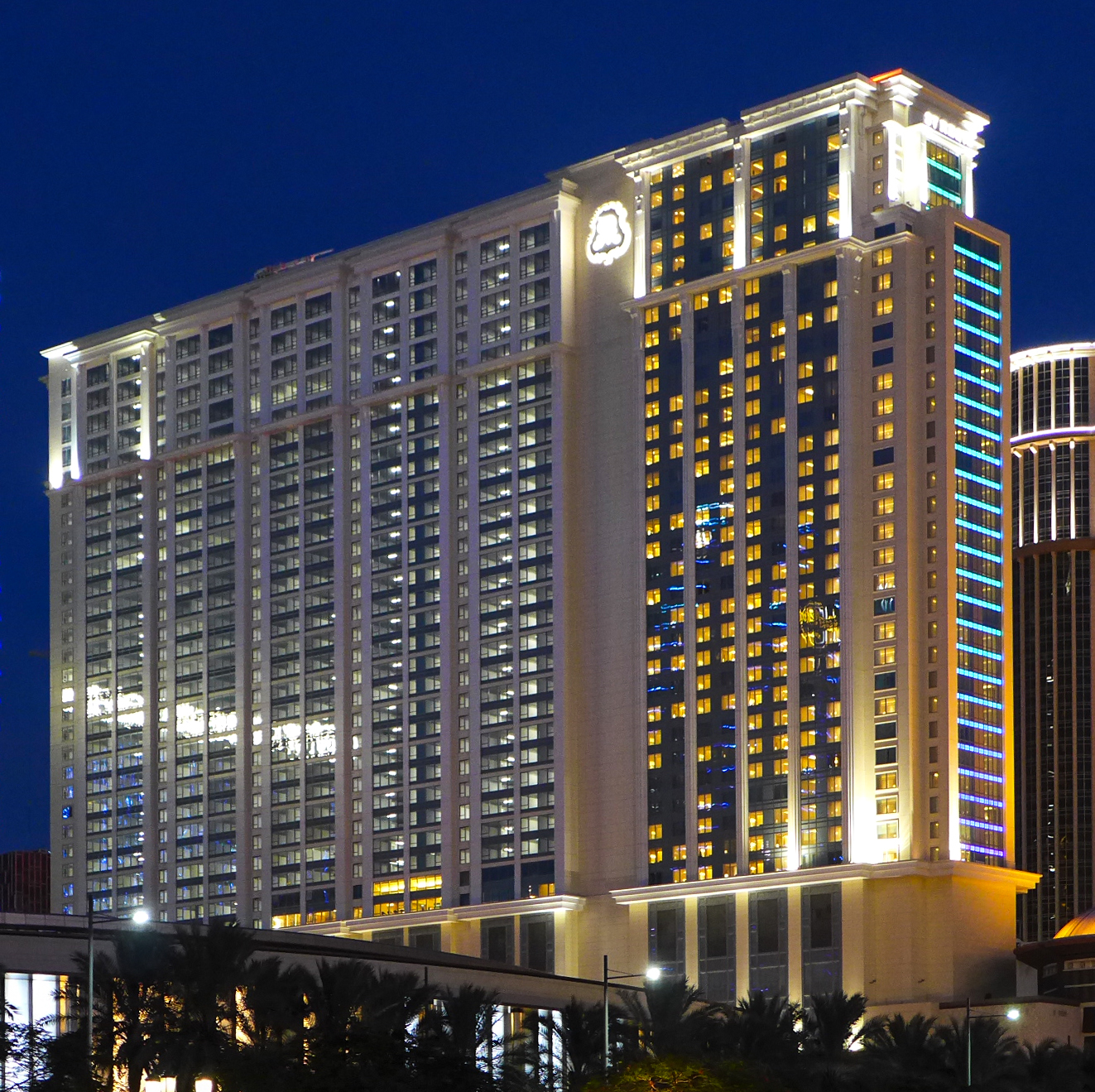
The St. Regis Macao

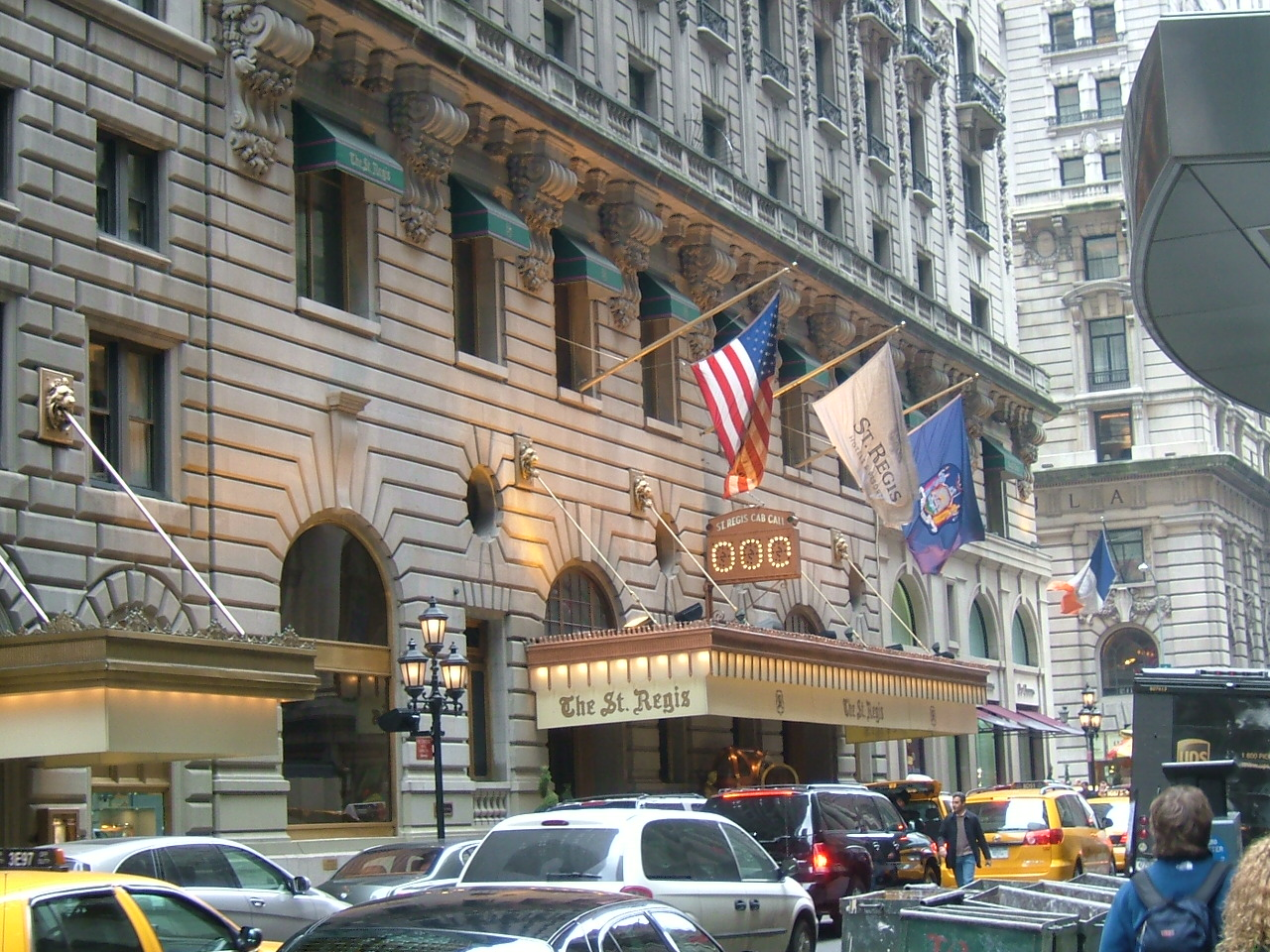
The St. Regis New York

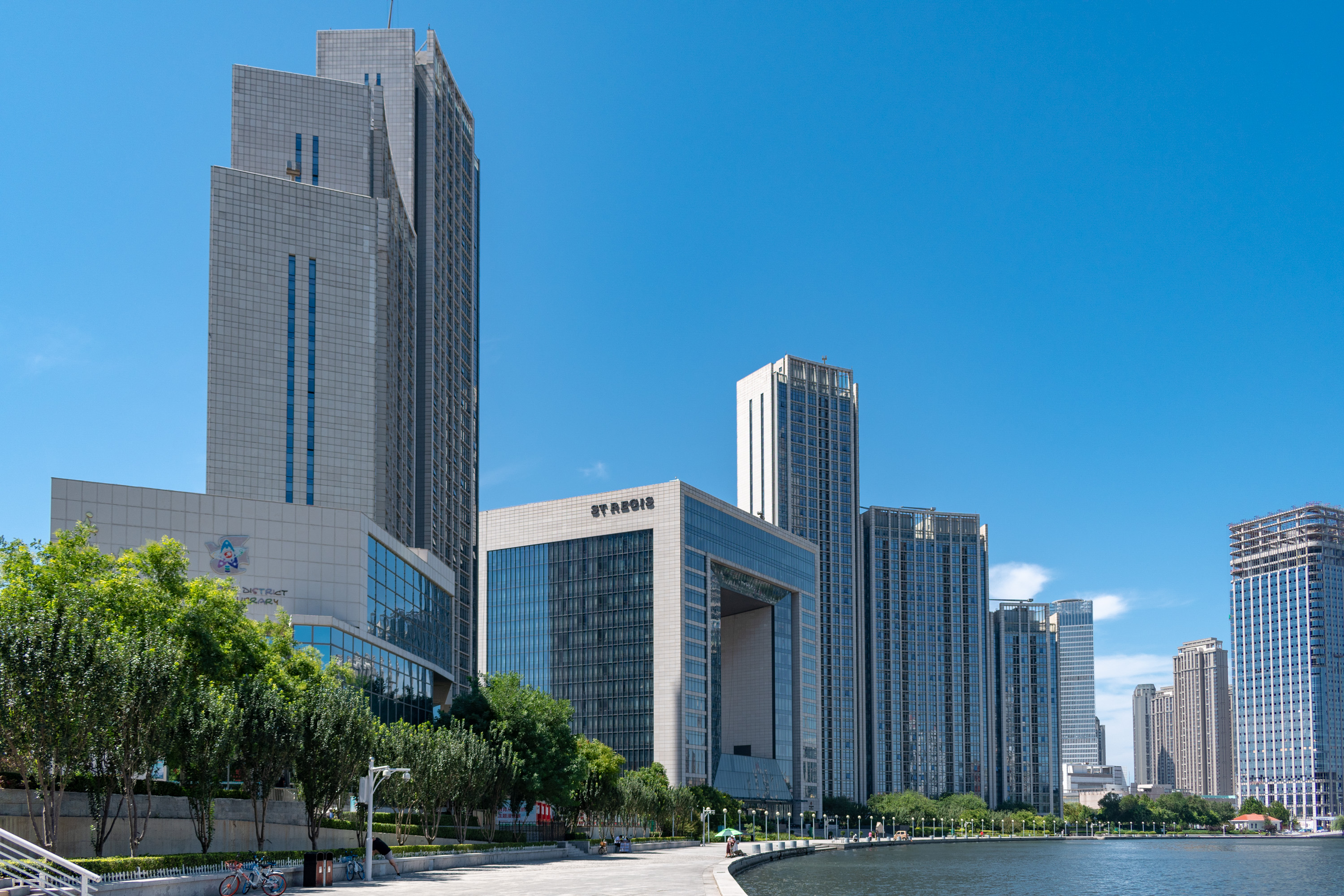
The St. Regis Tianjin

As of the end of 2025, there are 61 St. Regis-branded hotels around the world with over 10,000 rooms.

North America

North America
No.	Name	Location	Country/Territory	Opening Year
1	The St. Regis Aspen Resort	Aspen	United States	1998
2	The St. Regis Atlanta	Atlanta	United States	2009
3	The St. Regis Bal Harbour Resort	Bal Harbour	United States	2012
4	The St. Regis Chicago	Chicago	United States	2023
5	The St. Regis Deer Valley	Deer Valley	United States	2009
6	The St. Regis Houston	Houston	United States	1999
7	The St. Regis Longboat Key	Longboat Key	United States	2024
8	The St. Regis New York	New York City	United States	1904
9	The St. Regis San Francisco	San Francisco	United States	2005
10	The St. Regis Toronto	Toronto	Canada	2018
11	The St. Regis Washington, D.C.	Washington, D.C.	United States	1999

Latin America and the Caribbean

Latin America and the Caribbean
No.	Name	Location	Country/Territory	Opening Year
1	The St. Regis Bahia Beach Resort, Puerto Rico	Puerto Rico	(United States) Puerto Rico	2010
2	The St. Regis Bermuda Resort	Bermuda	(United Kingdom) Bermuda	2021
3	The St. Regis Cap Cana Resort	Punta Cana	Dominican Republic	2025
4	The St. Regis Kanai Resort Riviera Maya	Riviera Maya	Mexico	2023
5	The St. Regis Mexico City	Mexico City	Mexico	2009
6	The St. Regis Punta Mita Resort	Punta Mita	Mexico	2008

Europe

Europe
No.	Name	Location	Country/Territory	Opening Year
1	The St. Regis Belgrade	Belgrade	Serbia	2024
2	The St. Regis Florence	Florence	Italy	2011
3	The St. Regis Istanbul	Istanbul	Turkey	2015
4	The St. Regis Mardavall Mallorca Resort	Mallorca	Spain	2008
5	The St. Regis Rome	Rome	Italy	2000
6	The St. Regis Venice	Venice	Italy	2019

Africa and the Middle East

Africa and the Middle East
No.	Name	Location	Country/Territory	Opening Year
1	The St. Regis Abu Dhabi	Abu Dhabi	United Arab Emirates	2013
2	The St. Regis Al Mouj Muscat Resort	Muscat	Oman	2024
3	The St. Regis Almasa Hotel, Cairo	New Administrative Capital	Egypt	2021
4	The St. Regis Amman	Amman	Jordan	2019
5	The St. Regis Cairo	Cairo	Egypt	2021
6	The St. Regis Doha	Doha	Qatar	2012
7	The St. Regis Downtown Dubai	Dubai	United Arab Emirates	2021
8	The St. Regis Dubai The Palm	Palm Jumeirah	United Arab Emirates	2021
9	The St. Regis Kuwait	Kuwait City	Kuwait	2022
10	The St. Regis La Bahia Blanca Resort, Tamuda Bay	M'diq-Fnideq	Morocco	2023
11	The St. Regis Marsa Arabia Island, The Pearl Qatar	The Pearl Island	Qatar	2022
12	The St. Regis Red Sea Resort	Red Sea Project	Saudi Arabia	2024
13	The St. Regis Riyadh	Riyadh	Saudi Arabia	2023
14	The St. Regis Saadiyat Island Resort, Abu Dhabi	Saadiyat Island	United Arab Emirates	2011

Asia and Pacific

Asia and Pacific
No.	Name	Location	Country/Territory	Opening Year
1	The St. Regis Astana	Astana	Kazakhstan	2017
2	The St. Regis Bali Resort	Bali	Indonesia	2008
3	The St. Regis Bangkok	Bangkok	Thailand	2011
4	The St. Regis Beijing	Beijing	China	2000
5	The St. Regis Bora Bora Resort	Bora Bora	(France) French Polynesia	2006
6	The St. Regis Changsha	Changsha	China	2017
7	The St. Regis Chengdu	Chengdu	China	2014
8	The St. Regis Goa Resort	Goa	India	2022
9	The St. Regis Hong Kong	Hong Kong	(China) Hong Kong	2019
10	The St. Regis Jakarta	Jakarta	Indonesia	2022
11	The St. Regis Kuala Lumpur	Kuala Lumpur	Malaysia	2016
12	The St. Regis Langkawi	Langkawi	Malaysia	2016
13	The St. Regis Lhasa Resort	Lhasa	China	2010
14	The St. Regis Macao	Macau	(China) Macau	2015
15	The St. Regis Maldives Vommuli Resort	Dhaalu Atoll	Maldives	2016
16	The St. Regis Mumbai	Mumbai	India	2015
17	The St. Regis Osaka	Osaka	Japan	2010
18	The St. Regis Qingdao	Qingdao	China	2021
19	The St. Regis Sanya Yalong Bay Resort	Sanya	China	2011
20	The St. Regis Shanghai Jingan	Shanghai	China	2017
21	The St. Regis Shenzhen	Shenzhen	China	2012
22	The St. Regis Singapore	Singapore	Singapore	2007
23	The St. Regis Tianjin	Tianjin	China	2011
24	The St. Regis Zhuhai	Zhuhai	China	2018
