= Quad Cinema =

Multiplex theater in New York City

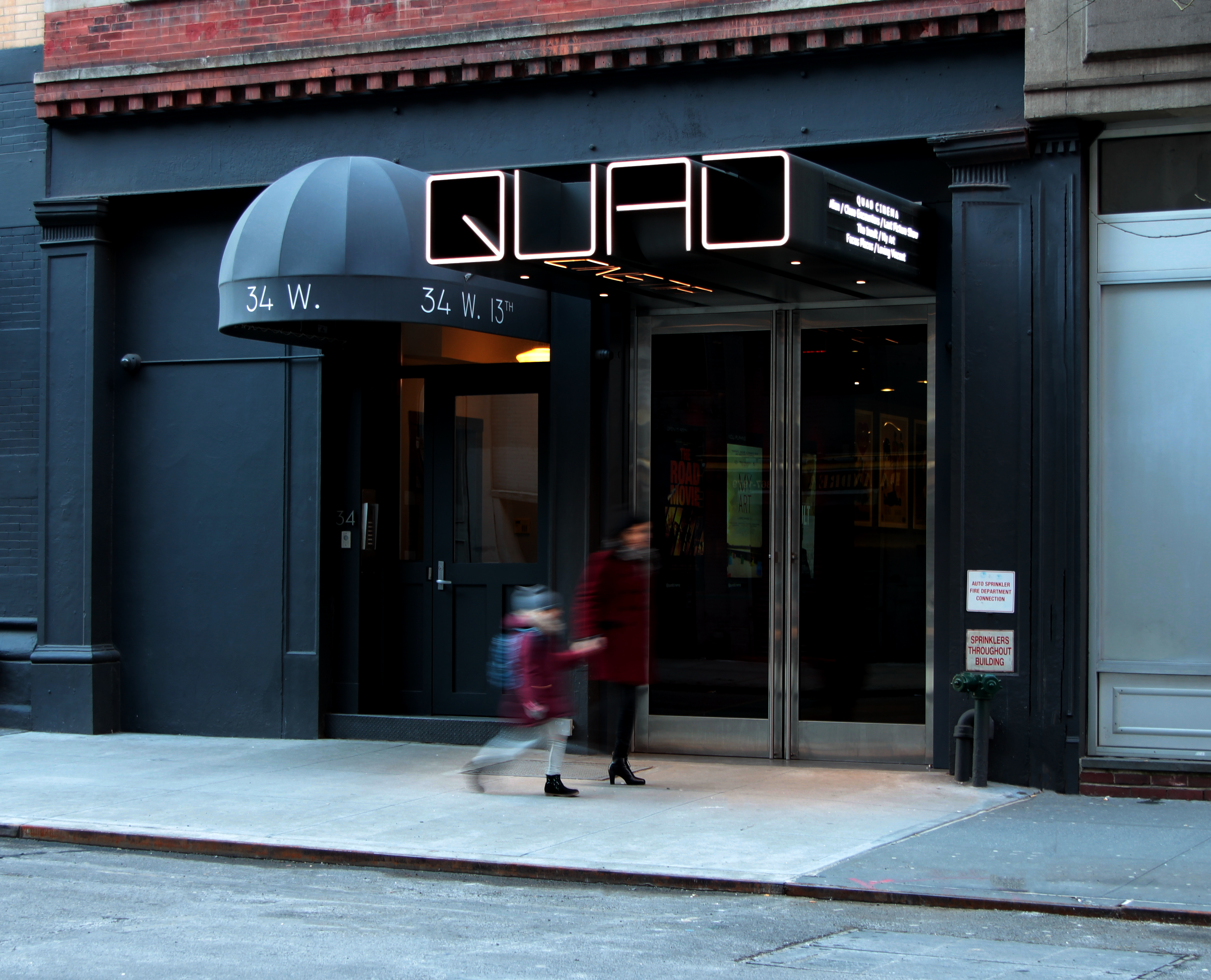
- Interactive map of the Quad Cinema area

General information
- Type: Cinema
- Location: 34 West 13th Street, New York City, United States
- Coordinates: 40.735977°N 73.995904°W
- Opened: October 18, 1972; 53 years ago
- Owner: Charles S. Cohen

Website
- quadcinema.com

The Quad Cinema is New York City's first small four-screen multiplex theater. Located at 34 West 13th Street in Greenwich Village, it was opened by entrepreneur Maurice Kanbar, along with his younger brother Elliott S. Kanbar in October 1972. It has been described as "one of the oldest independent cinemas in the city" and "a vibrant center for art house films."

== History ==
In the late 1960s, Maurice Kanbar, an inventor and real estate investor, purchased a six-story loft in Manhattan with plans to create an off-Broadway theater. After those plans fell through, he found himself with a large block of unused ground floor space. Kanbar believed a movie theater with multiple small auditoriums rather than a few larger ones could be profitable even with smaller audiences at most screenings. In October 1972, he and his younger brother, Elliott S. Kanbar, opened the Quad, New York City's first four-screen movie theater, and what Kanbar has called "the East Coast's first multiplex".

From 1972 to 1988 the theater was operated by Bernard Goldberg, executive vice-president of Golden Theatre Management, operator of the Quad and six other New York City houses. The theater exhibited Hollywood films, independent films, and revivals of older films, but had difficulty obtaining the most attractive releases due to the exclusive licensing practices then followed by film distributors. Legal action led to substantial monetary settlements.

In 1988, Maurice's brother Elliott took over the theater's operations. Facing competition from new theaters opening in Lower Manhattan, the Quad adopted a strategy of exhibiting foreign and independent films. This strategy proved financially successful, although it also led to competition with other downtown art film exhibitors, notably the nonprofit Film Forum and the IFC Center. In a 2010 interview, Elliott Kanbar noted that in its earlier history the theater had benefited from a switch of its distributor relationship to City Cinemas, which had a positive relationship with Walt Disney Pictures and its Touchstone Pictures affiliate, and that it was regularly frequented by Andy Warhol, whose "fans would come in droves" and whose influence was a factor in the theater's "big homosexual audience for certain films." In March 2010, the Quad announced it would assist national and foreign filmmakers wishing to self-distribute low-budget films via "four wall distribution", the Quadflix program. In May 2012, it initiated the program Quadflix Select.

On Thursday, August 21, 2014, The New York Times reported sale of the Quad to Charles S. Cohen's Cohen Media Group as well as planned renovations. The Quad closed for a multi-million dollar alteration in May 2015. It reopened on April 14, 2017, with a Lina Wertmüller retrospective.

After Cohen acquired Landmark Theatres in December 2018, Landmark took over booking for the Quad.

== See also ==
- List of art cinemas in New York City
- Culture of New York City
