= Curzon Film =

British film distributor

Curzon Film World Limited
- Formerly: Curzon Artificial Eye
- Industry: Film distribution
- Founded: 1976
- Founder: Andi Engel; Pamela Balfry
- Headquarters: London, England
- Key people: Louisa Dent (MD, Artificial Eye); Philip Knatchbull (CEO, CAE); Tony Tabatznik (Chairman and majority owner, Curzon World)
- Products: Film
- Parent: Curzon (Fortress Investment Group)
- Website: film.curzon.com

Curzon Film (/ˈkɜːrzən/), formerly known as Artificial Eye or Curzon Artificial Eye, is a British film distributor, specialising in independent, foreign-language and art house films for cinema and home entertainment.

== History ==
Artificial Eye was founded in 1976 by Andi Engel (11 November 1942 – 26 December 2006), a German-born film enthusiast, and his then wife, Pamela Balfry, who had a background working with Richard Roud at the London Film Festival. She became the company's first managing director.

Its first release was Theo Angelopoulos' The Travelling Players and released over 350 films in 30 years.

In 2006 Artificial Eye became a part of Curzon World, a group of companies in the film entertainment industry which also includes the Curzon chain of cinemas, video on demand service Curzon Home Cinema, the retail DVD distributor Fusion Media Sales, and horror film distributor Chelsea Films (launched in 2010).

Curzon Artificial Eye releases some 20 new theatrical films and 30 DVD and Blu-ray titles in the UK each year, as well as digital releases via several platforms, such as iTunes and in-house Curzon Home Cinema.

In 2016, Curzon Artificial Eye renamed to Curzon Film.

On 23 December 2019, Curzon Artificial Eye, along with parent company Curzon, was acquired by American film distributor Cohen Media Group.

In 2020, Curzon Film, in association with StudioCanal UK, released Parasite to UK audiences, which would become UK's highest grossing foreign language film of all time.

In February 2024, American investment firm Fortress Investment Group sued Cohen Realty Enterprises for defaulting on loans amounting to $534 million. Fortress then requested the New York Supreme Court to grant a motion for a foreclosure sale, which was later set for November 8 that year. Fortress was reportedly the only bidder for Curzon and related entities, initially offering $5 million to acquire the company. A few days later, it was announced that Fortress had acquired Curzon for an undisclosed sum.

In April 2024, Curzon announced that it would revive the storied Artificial Eye label, dormant for nearly a decade, for arthouse and indie films curated by Curzon's acquisitions team with a special focus on world cinema. The first release under the relaunched banner will be the Berlinale title My Favourite Cake, with a rebranded look debuting with the film.
