= Olivier Elzer =

French chef

- Born: 18 April 1979 (age 47); Koblenz, Germany
- Education: CFA Nérée à Cannes
- Occupation: Chef
- Spouse: Monica Chang Elzer
- Children: 3
- Awards: Knight in the Order of Agricultural Merit
- Website: www.olivierelzer.com

Olivier Elzer (born 18 April 1979) is a French chef. He was named one of the top 22 best young chefs in France by the guide Gault Millau in 2007. As of May 2025, he has been awarded a total of 30 Michelin stars for 16 consecutive years working in France and Hong Kong. Elzer is recognised for his work as head chef of Pierre at Mandarin Oriental Hotel Hong Kong, L'Atelier de Joël Robuchon and his own branding restaurant, Seasons, by Olivier E. In 2018, Elzer established L'Envol, a modern French fine dining restaurant at The St. Regis Hong Kong. L'Envol has two Michelin stars. In 2022, Elzer created his own casual dining concept in Hong Kong named Clarence. Chef Elzer was awarded the Knight in the Order of Agricultural Merit of the French Republic in 2022.

== Early life and education ==
Elzer was born in Koblenz, Germany, and was raised in Alsace, France. He graduated from CFA Nérée à Cannes and received his CAP and BEP diploma in 1998. Elzer started training under Christian Métral during 1996–1997 at L'Auberge du Jarrier, a French restaurant in Biot. In 1997–1998, he trained under Yves Merville in Le Panorama, a French restaurant in Hôtel Royal Riviera, situated in Saint-Jean-Cap-Ferrat.

== Career ==
Elzer began his professional career as a commis in the restaurant La Palme d'Or of Hôtel Martinez (two Michelin stars) under chef Christan Willer in 1999–2000. From 2000 to 2001, he worked at La Terasse of Hôtel Juana (two Michelin stars) under chef Christian Morisset and Au Crocodile (three Michelin stars) under chef Émile Jung as a chef de partie. Elzer worked as a sous chef between 2001 and 2005 in restaurants La Pyramide (two Michelin stars) under chef Patrick Henriroux, Fouquet's Barriere in Hôtel Barrière Le Fouquet's under chef Jean Yves Leuranguer and Les Elysees of Hôtel Vernet (two Michelin stars) under chef Éric Briffard.

=== Head chef ===
Elzer became the head chef of Abbaye De La Bussière – La Bussière sur Ouche – Côte d’Or in 2006 and was awarded his first Michelin star in 2007 and retained it in 2008.

He moved to Hong Kong in 2009 to become the head chef of the French restaurant Pierre Restaurant (two Michelin stars) by Pierre Gagnaire in the Mandarin Oriental. He retained the two Michelin stars in 2010 and 2011.

In 2011–2014, Elzer was the head chef of the fine dining French restaurant L’Atelier de Joël Robuchon Hong Kong (two Michelin stars) and was awarded three Michelin stars from 2012 to 2014.

In 2014, Elzer proceeded to cofound and become the head chef of his own branding restaurant, Seasons by Olivier E in Hong Kong. He was awarded one Michelin star every year from 2014 to 2017. Elzer was praised for his innovative approach towards classic French dishes with Asian influences. “French recipes are combined with some Asian influences and the chef’s own ideas to create dishes that are full of verve and originality,” wrote the inspectors in the 2017 edition of Hong Kong's Michelin guide. Seasons was also awarded to be one of the Top 20 Restaurants by the Tatler Hong Kong restaurant guide.

In 2018, Elzer has signed a contract with Marriott Group to establish L'Envol, a fine dining restaurant in St. Regis Hong Kong.

In April 2019, L'Envol was opened and Elzer had become the hotel's Culinary Director cum L'Envol Executive Chef, who led the restaurant to be awarded Michelin Star in 2019/20, and 2 Michelin Stars in 2020/21.

In 2021, Elzer established his own French modern dining concept named Clarence.

In 2022, Elzer was the first celebrity chef to collaborate with Louis Vuitton on their first restaurant in Chengdu, China. The Hall restaurant takes inspiration from both classic French and Mediterranean cuisine.

In 2022, Chef Elzer was awarded the Knight in the Order of Agricultural Merit of the French Republic.

=== Operations ===
Elzer founded his company, Olivier Colony Limited, in 2016. A professional F&B Consultancy providing services for restaurants, hotels and private functions. The company extends services to many catering and restaurant groups and hotels. Clients include Marriott Group hotels, Hilton Group hotels and Kempinski Hotels Group.
