= Curzon Cinemas =

British cinema chain

Curzon Cinemas Limited
- Industry: Leisure, Entertainment & refreshments
- Founded: 1934
- Number of locations: 17 cinemas
- Products: Tickets, popcorn, alcohol, drinks & confectionery
- Parent: Curzon (Fortress Investment Group)
- Website: www.curzon.com

Curzon Cinemas Limited (/ˈkɜːrzən/) is a chain of cinemas based in the United Kingdom, mostly in London, specialising in art house films. They also have a video on demand service, Curzon Home Cinema.

== History ==
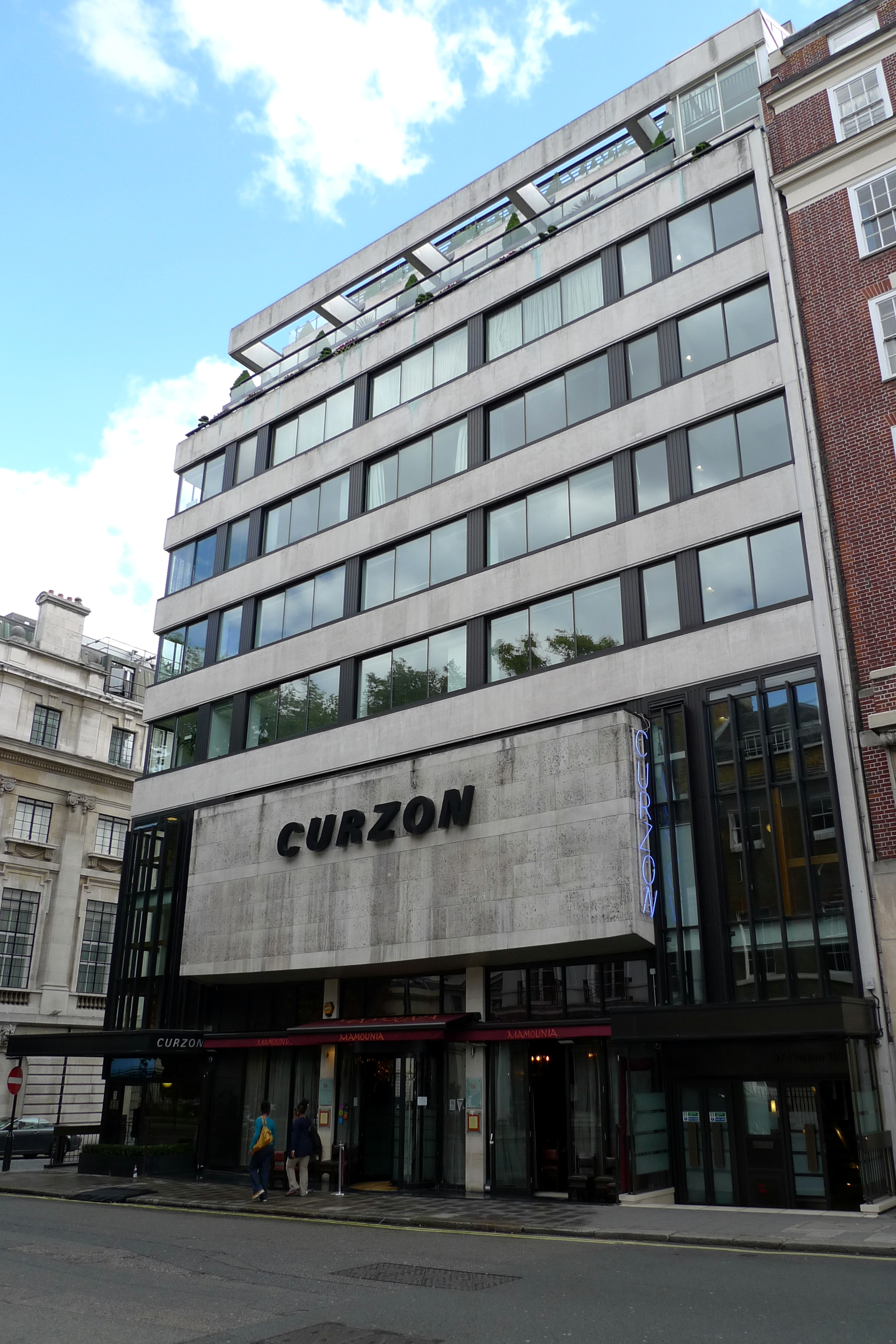
Curzon Mayfair Cinema

Curzon Cinemas were established in 1934 when Harold Wingate, who imported unknown films during the post World War I period, opened the first cinema in Mayfair. The second location, Curzon Bloomsbury, opened in 1972.

In 2006, Philip Knatchbull acquired Curzon Cinemas and Curzon acquired film distributor, Artificial Eye. On 23 December 2019, American-based Cohen Media Group acquired Curzon from Knatchbull, including Curzon Artificial Eye, but Knatchbull remained as chief executive officer until 2023.

In February 2024, American investment firm Fortress Investment Group sued Cohen Realty Enterprises for defaulting on loans amounting to $534 million. Fortress then requested the New York Supreme Court to grant a motion for a foreclosure sale, which was later set for November 8 that year. Fortress was reportedly the only bidder for Curzon and related entities, initially offering $5 million to acquire the company. A few days later, it was announced that Fortress had acquired Curzon for $5million. Following the change, Knatchbull returned as interim executive chairman.

On 23 June 2026, Curzon announced the closure of their Sheffield cinema, stating that the location was no longer profitable due to lack of admissions.

== Locations ==
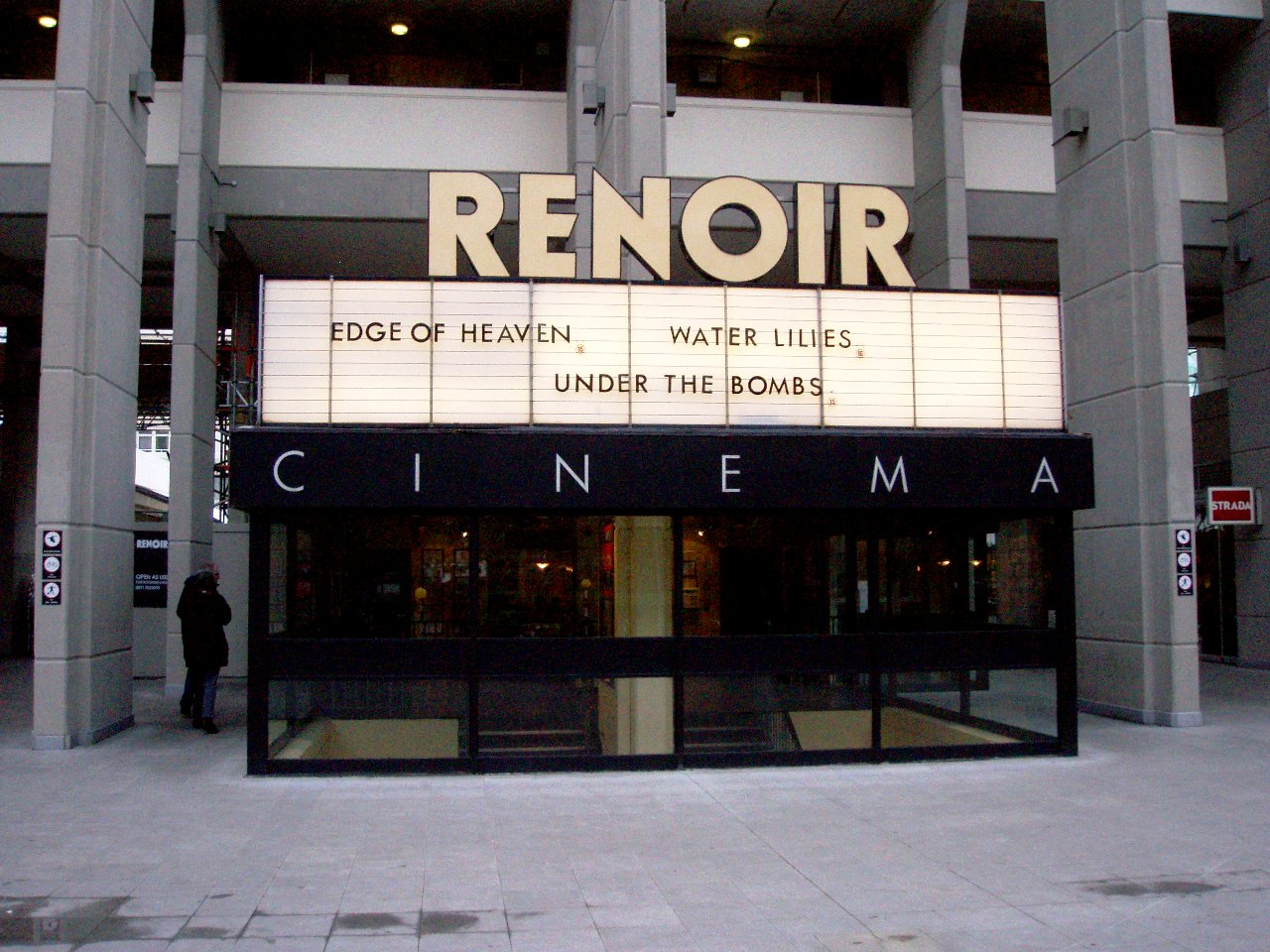
The Renoir, Bloomsbury

Curzon Cinemas currently have 16 cinema complexes throughout the United Kingdom.

=== Current ===
Location	Screens	Notes
Aldgate	4	Opened January 2017
Bloomsbury	6	"The Renoir" Acquired March 2015
Camden	5	Opened 29 October 2021
Canterbury Riverside	5	Opened 26 August 2022
Colchester	3	Opened 6 July 2018
Hoxton	3	Opened 4 June 2021
Kingston	4	Opened 11 November 2022
Knutsford	3	Opened 28 February 2013
Mayfair	2	First Curzon from 1934.
Oxford	5	Opened Autumn 2017
Richmond	1	Previously Richmond Filmhouse
Soho	3	Opened 8 March 1985
Victoria	5	Opened May 2014
Wimbledon	3	Previously "HMVcurzon"

=== Former ===
Location	Screens	Notes
Canterbury Westgate	3	Opened in 2014 and closed permanently on 2 July 2026.
Chelsea	1	Taken over in 1983 and closed 31 March 2018 but due to reopen in 2026 following redevelopment of the site.
Ripon	2	Opened 31 October 2013 and closed 1 July 2023.
Sheffield	3	Opened in 2015 in the former Sheffield Banking Company building, and closed permanently on 29 June 2026.

=== Franchised locations ===
Curzon Cinemas have also franchised their name and operate in partnership with a number of other locations.

Location	Partner's name	Number of screens	Notes
South Bank	Curzon Sea Containers	1	Previously Curzon Mondrian, renamed in January 2019 in line with rebrand of Sea Containers Hotel

=== Future locations ===
Curzon intends to reopen its Chelsea cinema (which was closed in May 2018) in 2026 after the site is redeveloped by Cadogan Estates. They are also planning to open a new cinema in Hammersmith.

== Related companies ==
Curzon Film is a sister company of Curzon Cinemas, originally formed as Artificial Eye in 1976 and acquired by the group in 2006. They cover acquisition, production and distribution rights to films across the UK and Ireland. Artificial Eye was relaunched as a separate label of the group in 2024.

Curzon Home Cinema is a video on demand service launched in 2010.
