= Curzon Home Cinema =

Video-on-demand streaming service

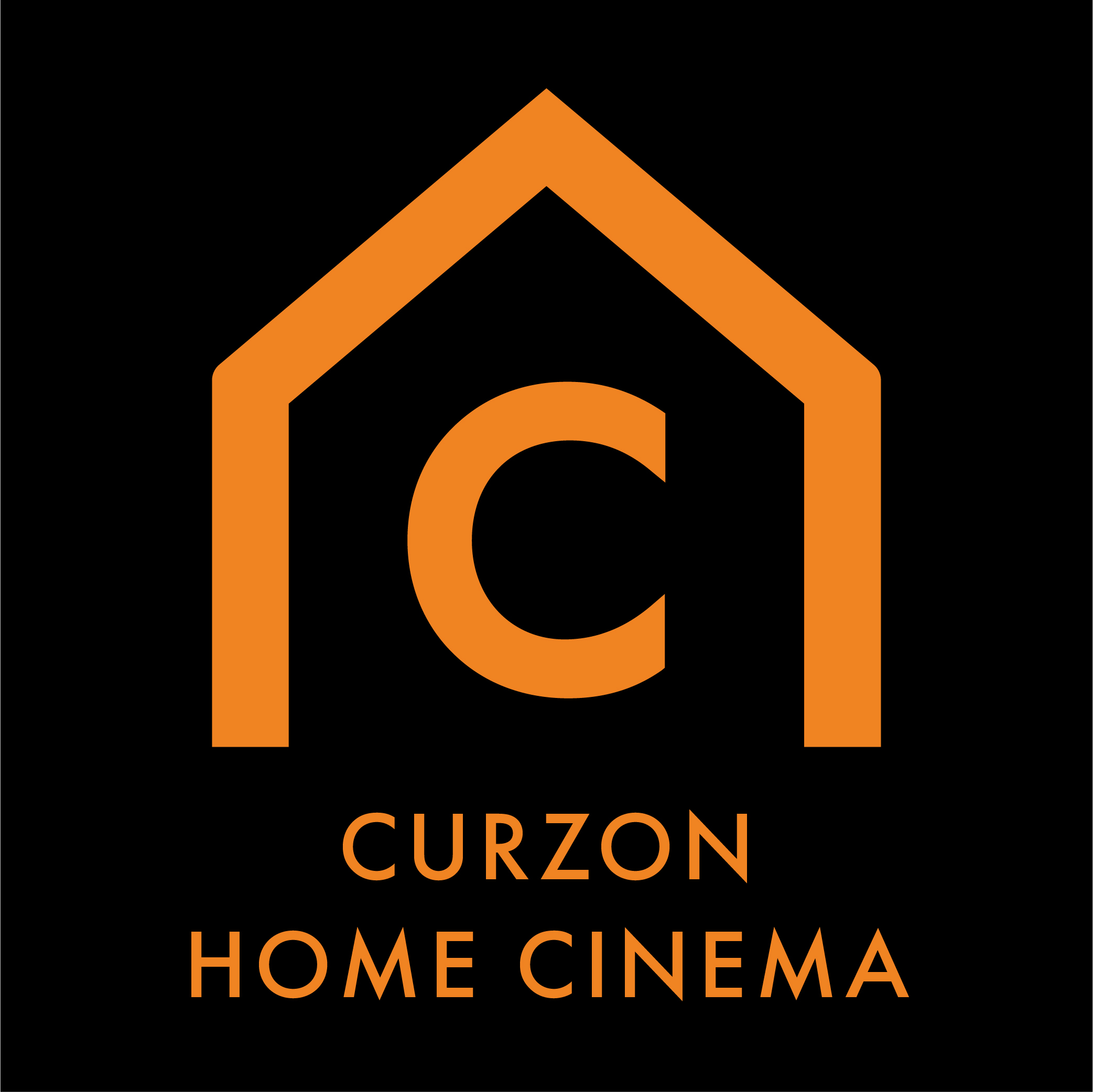
- Type: Private
- Industry: Video on demand
- Founded: London, England (2010)
- Headquarters: London, England, United Kingdom
- Key people: Philip Knatchbull, CEO
- Parent: Curzon (Fortress Investment Group)
- Website: homecinema.curzon.com

Curzon Home Cinema is a video-on-demand streaming service available in the UK and Ireland where movies are available to rent on a pay-per-watch basis. It is part of the Curzon World group which has roots going back to 1934. Films on this service are managed by the Curzon Cinemas team, focusing on independent, art-house and foreign-language titles.

== History ==
Initially launched as Curzon on Demand in 2010, and rebranded in 2013, it was the first service in the UK to show selected new cinema releases at home (premium video on demand), the same date they were available to watch in cinemas (known as day-and-date). UK film distributor Curzon Artificial Eye, founded in 1976, is also part of the same business, providing day-and-date releases to the platform, as well as a catalogue of classic titles, including a significant number of Cannes Film Festival Palme d'Or winners. In 2015, more than 60 European films were given day-and-date releases, including Curzon's release of Andrew Haigh's 45 Years, the first such UK title to make over £1 million at the box office.

From 2017 to 2021, Curzon offered an SVOD streaming service called Curzon12 where Curzon cinemas members could stream 12 curated films a month for free with their membership on Curzon Home Cinema, whose library featured classics and award winners from filmmakers such as François Truffaut and Andrea Arnold.

On 23 December 2019, Curzon Home Cinema, along with Artificial Eye and Curzon Cinemas, was acquired by American film distributor Cohen Media Group.

In 2020, during the COVID-19 pandemic, Curzon's streaming platform allowed viewers to continue to enjoy new releases, Zoom Q&As with filmmakers and other digital content when cinemas were closed.

In 2021, the company launched a new Curzon Home Cinema website with updated apps and the capacity to download films to watch offline. Curzon rolled out a new membership package to customers, giving them 'credits' that can be redeemed as cinema tickets and films streamed online.

Curzon Home Cinema also features live Q&As across the service in the form of moderated conversations with acclaimed filmmakers (including Mike Leigh, Joanna Hogg, and Werner Herzog) and actors (such as Elisabeth Moss, Kristin Scott Thomas and Jesse Eisenberg). Curzon Home Cinema has worked in digital partnership with a number of film festivals, streaming an online programme of movies for the Edinburgh International Film Festival and Raindance among others, as well as broadcasting the European Film Awards. The Curzon Cinemas team curates weekly collections for the site that comprise a selection of thematically linked films such as biopics, romances or war movies.

In November 2024, Curzon Home Cinema as well as Curzon Cinemas and Curzon Film were acquired in a foreclosure auction by Fortress Investment Group.

== Recognition ==
In 2016, Curzon Home Cinema won OTT TV Initiative of the Year at the 2nd Content Innovation Awards.

In 2017, BAFTA presented Curzon, which includes Curzon Home Cinema, with the Outstanding British Contribution to Cinema Award at the 70th British Academy Film Awards.

== Devices and platforms ==
Curzon Home Cinema is available to customers through TV and mobile apps and OTT (over-the-top content) platforms, with reach into 6.5 million homes, including mobile apps.

Curzon Home Cinema is available with these partners and devices:

- iOS app
- Apple TV
- Android app
- Android TV
- Chromecast
- Amazon Fire TV
- Curzon Home Cinema Website
