= Cohen Film Collection =

American film archive

The Cohen Film Collection is a film archive currently held by Cohen Media Group. Containing several hundreds of rare and classic movies spanning from the silent film era to the present day, it was previously referred to as the Rohauer Library prior to Cohen Media Group's ownership in 2011.

== History ==
The American film programmer Raymond Rohauer had acquired several films of the actor Buster Keaton in the 1950s through forming a partnership with the actor; during Rohauer's career, he acquired several films through several ways; he formed similar partnerships, such as with Douglas Fairbanks Jr. for films produced by Douglas Fairbanks, according to preservationist Tim Lanza, bought story rights of films based on novels, and distribution rights thereafter, as well as making contracts.

Several instances of Rohauer's acquisitions would become the basis of his collection, which is usually referred to as the Rohauer Library. Rohauer, through his collection, reissued and released the films for theatrical distribution. The rights to the films were occasionally challenged by means of litigations, alleging that the acquired films were not licensed, only to end with settlements.

After Rohauer died in 1987, the Rohauer library was briefly owned by distributor Alan Twyman, before the film company The Douris Corporation acquired it in 1995. The library was estimated to have 700 feature and short films in the catalogue at the time of the acquisition. During the Douris Corporation's ownership, films from the Rohauer Library were distributed by Kino for home videos.

In 2008, The Douris Corporation went into receivership and sought licensing deals and liquidation of the library. By 2011, The Douris Corporation sold the library to real estate developer Charles S. Cohen, who incorporated the acquired assets into his film distribution company Cohen Media Group.

Initially distributed by Entertainment One, The Rohauer Library has since been renamed the Cohen Film Collection and continues to add various films from filmmakers, such as Ken Loach, Claude Chabrol, and Patrice Chéreau, to its catalogue. In October 2020, the Cohen Media Group renewed a deal with Kino (now known as Kino Lorber) to distribute their titles for home video and digital releases, which includes the Cohen Film Collection.

== Organization ==
The Cohen Film Collection is based in Columbus, Ohio. It is part of the Cohen Media Group, based in New York City.

== Preservation ==
After Cohen Media Group's acquisition in 2011, Charles S. Cohen and preservationist Tim Lanza invested in restoring the films for theatrical, home and digital releases.

== See also ==
- Film preservation
- Film archives in the United States
