= Charles S. Cohen =

American distributor and real estate owner

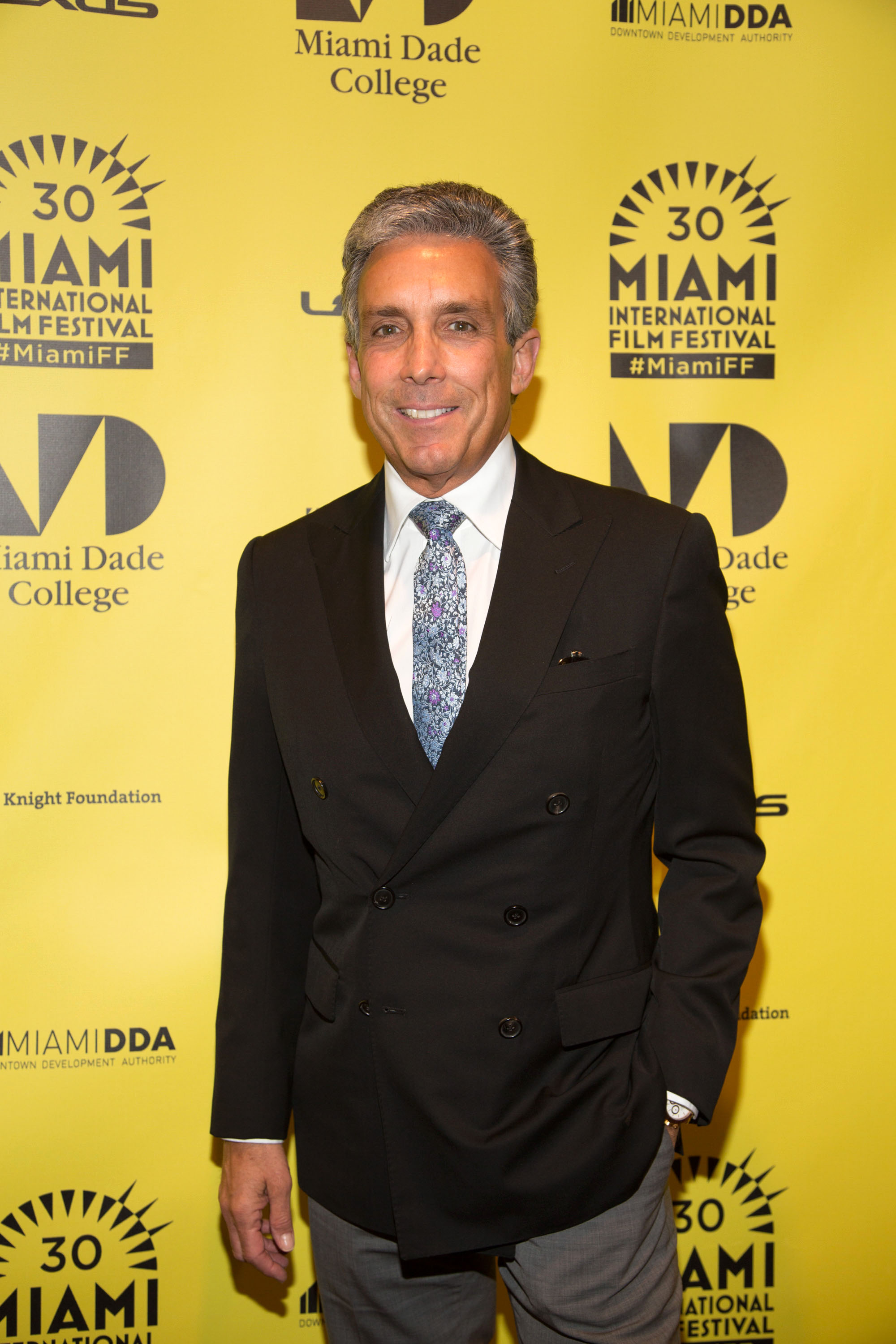
- Cohen at the 2013 Miami International Film Festival
- Born: Charles Steven Cohen; February 8, 1952 (age 74)
- Education: Tufts University (B.A.); Brooklyn Law School (J.D.)
- Occupations: real estate developer film distributor
- Known for: President and CMO of Cohen Brothers Realty Corporation
- Spouse: Clo Jacobs
- Children: 4
- Parent(s): Gloria Cohen; Sherman Cohen

Charles Steven Cohen (born February 8, 1952) is an American real estate developer and film distributor.

== Early life and education ==
Cohen was raised in a Jewish family in Harrison, New York. He is the son of Gloria and Sherman Cohen and nephew to Eddie and Mortimer Cohen. In the 1950s, the Cohen brothers (Eddie, Mortimer, and Sherman Cohen) founded Cohen Brothers Realty & Construction Corporation after successfully running various other businesses prior.

At the age of 16, Cohen made his first short film winning an honorable mention at the Kodak Teenage Movie Awards competition. Cohen attended New York University for a year and a half before transferring to Tufts University where he majored in English.

In 1974, Cohen graduated from Tufts University, and in 1977 he graduated from Brooklyn Law School.

== Career ==
=== Real estate ===
Cohen Brothers Realty Corporation is a private commercial real estate development and management firm with a portfolio of 12 million square feet of wholly owned and passively managed Class A office buildings and showrooms of over 300 companies across the United States. Signature projects include the revitalization of Manhattan's Decoration & Design (D&D) Building, Southern California's Pacific Design Center, and the Design Center of the Americas (DCOTA) in South Florida, the largest design center in the United States.

Cohen's New York City properties include 623 Fifth Avenue, 622 Third Avenue, 135 East 57th Street, 750 Lexington Avenue, 3 East 54th Street, 805 Third Avenue, 3 Park Avenue, 475 Park Avenue South, and the D&D Building at 979 Third Avenue.

Lawsuits

In 2021, several lawsuits were filed against the business accusing Cohen of bullying and creating a hostile working environment for women. The company denied the allegations and said it does not tolerate sexual harassment.

In early 2024, Fortress Investment Group sued Cohen for a default on a $534mn loan made in 2019. In August, a New York Supreme Court judge approved proceeding with a foreclosure auction against properties owned by Cohen to recoup part of the value of the loans. Cohen disputed the claim, alleging that a restructuring agreement had been reached with Fortress. However, the court rejected Cohen's motion to postpone the auction. In November 2024, Fortress seized control of cinema chain Curzon for $5mn as part of the auction. Fortress also acquired control of companies that control the Design Center of the Americas, and Le Méridien hotel in Dania Beach in Florida. In March 2026, a New York Supreme Court judge told Cohen he had 45 days to settle his $187 million debt, or Fortress will begin to sell his properties.

==== Hotels ====
Representing his first venture into the hospitality arena, Cohen redeveloped and opened the Le Méridien Dania Beach at Fort Lauderdale Airport, a hotel located on the 40-acre DCOTA (Design Center of the Americas) campus.

=== Film ===
Cohen formed Cohen Media Group in 2008 as a film production and distribution company focused on independent and art-house cinema. The company later restored and released classic films through the Cohen Film Collection, which TheWrap described in 2022 as containing more than 800 films, and expanded into exhibition through the Quad Cinema, Landmark Theatres, and Curzon Cinemas. In 2022, CMG acquired the British international sales company HanWay Films.

=== Other ventures ===
From 1991 to 1993, Cohen was a chairman at the Federal Law Enforcement Foundation. Cohen has been on the Board of Trustees of the Museum of Contemporary Art, the Cooper Union for the Advancement of Science and Art, the Lighthouse International Theater, the Public Theater, Real Estate Board of New York, the Stella Adler Studio of Acting and the Film Society of Lincoln Center.

==== Fashion ====
Two UK fashion labels, Savile Row tailor Richard James and luxury shoe manufacturer and retailer Harrys of London, were acquired in 2016 and 2017. Cohen has a majority stake and is chairman of Richard James and will facilitate the brands' international growth strategies, beginning with Manhattan store openings on Park Avenue and East 57th Street.

==== Leather goods and luggage ====
In 2018, Cohen acquired T Anthony, a 73-year-old luxury leather goods & luggage company.

== Personal life ==
Cohen has been married twice. He has four children from his two marriages. He is divorced from his first wife; they have two children, a daughter and a son who works at Cohen Brothers Realty Corp. In 2004, he married his second wife, Clodagh "Clo" Margaret Jacobs, a former marketing and publicity executive for fashion designer Jimmy Choo, in a Jewish ceremony at the St. Regis Hotel in Manhattan; they also have two children. The couple divides their time between homes in Manhattan and suburban Connecticut.
