= Helen Jean Spiller =

American movie theater manager in Denver, Colorado

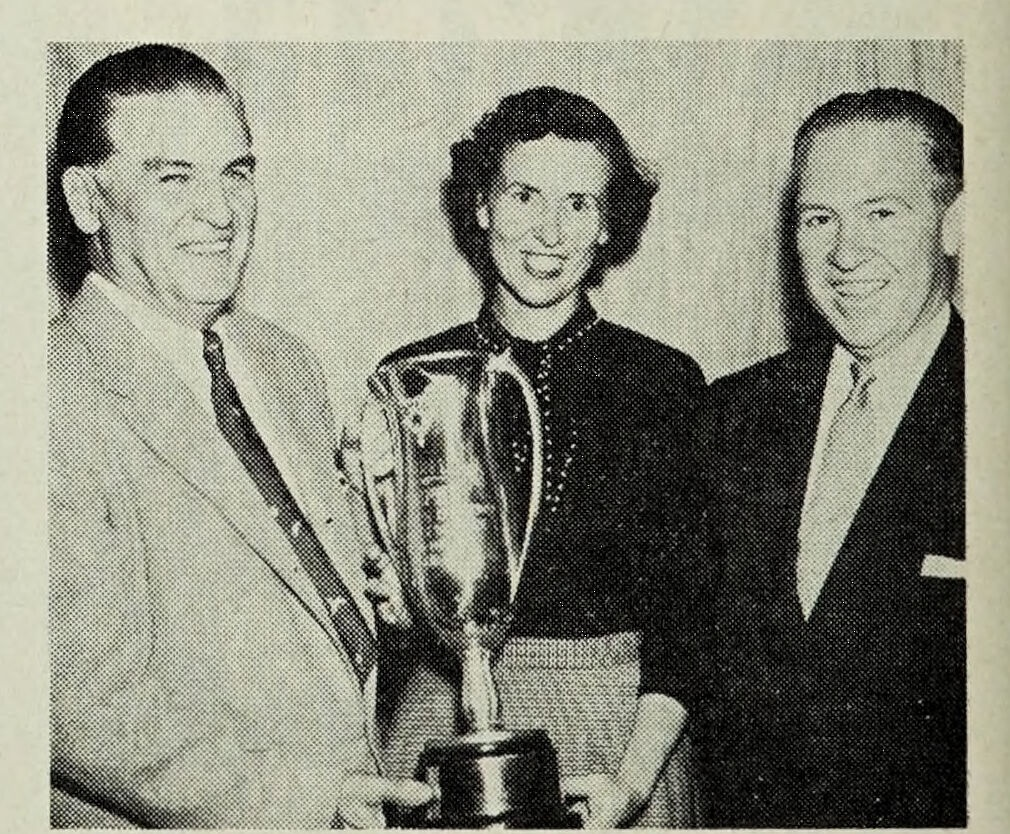
- Frank H. Ricketson Jr. (left) presents Helen Spiller (center) with the Clayton Long Trophy. Ray Davis (right), manager of Fox Intermountain Denver theater district. 1953.
- Born: c. 1914
- Died: October 22, 1957 (aged 43); Denver, Colorado, U.S.
- Occupation: Movie theater manager
- Years active: 1935–1957
- Employer: Fox-Intermountain Theaters
- Known for: Manager of the Esquire Theatre and its all woman staff

Helen Jean Spiller (c. 1914 – October 22, 1957) was an American movie theater manager in Denver, Colorado. In 1942, Fox-Intermountain Theaters appointed her manager of the Esquire Theatre, a neighborhood cinema at East Sixth Avenue and Downing Street. Her appointment made Spiller Denver's first woman theater manager, and the Esquire operated with an all woman staff.

Spiller managed the Esquire from its November 1942 reopening until about 1954. The theater showed first-run Hollywood films, hosted children's matinees and community events, joined corporate promotions, and booked special engagements such as the Denver roadshow run of Laurence Olivier's Hamlet in 1949. Her staff repeatedly won Fox-Intermountain courtesy awards. In 1953 she received the Clayton Long Trophy, the highest managerial award in the Fox-Intermountain chain. At her death in 1957, she was a personnel manager at the Denver and Centre theaters. She was credited with building a nationally-famous all woman staff at the Esquire.

== Early life and career ==
Spiller's age at death, 43, places her birth around 1914. She came to Colorado as a young woman and spent most of her life in Denver. She began in the Denver movie business more than 20 years before her death, working with theater operator Harry Huffman. At the time of her 1942 appointment, Spiller had seven years of experience in the motion-picture business, including three years as cashier at the downtown Denver Theatre, Fox-Intermountain's Denver flagship.

== Esquire Theatre management ==
Fox-Intermountain reopened the former Hiawatha Theater as the Esquire on November 10, 1942, after remodeling the building with a new front, screen, projection equipment, and sound equipment. The opening attraction was Thunder Birds, paired in the opening advertisement with Counter-Espionage. The Esquire opened as a first-run house, showing films "day and date" with the downtown Denver Theatre.

Spiller managed the new Esquire with an all woman staff. Spiller was known for greeting repeat patrons by name. Spiller's all woman staff were listed as Patricia Rupert, Norma Zieg, Edna Coons, Clara Crites, Margaret Gray, Paula Limbach, and Betty Kolber (the projectionist was a man).

In 1947 she was the only woman among many men at Fox-Intermountain's spring manager's meeting. In 1949, Spiller was the only women theater manager in the Rocky Mountain area. Betty Craig praised Spiller for her success as a woman theater manager.

After Spiller moved into personnel work, the Esquire staff held a 1956 "Staff Week" event that included an 11:45 p.m. screening of Henri-Georges Clouzot's Diabolique with a no-late-seating policy.

== Programming and community events ==
Several Esquire programs under Spiller were aimed at children or charity. In December 1949, the Esquire and the Bluebird Theater held a joint toy matinee with the Denver Santa Claus Shop, the Lions Club, and the American Legion. Warner Bros. and Columbia Pictures donated films, and the toys were to be distributed through welfare-agency channels. Coverage of the event photographed two-and-a-half-year-old Jimmy Grimshaw arriving early with a toy and quoted Spiller asking donors for wheel toys and sporting goods in usable condition. Spiller planned another free toy matinee in 1951, with an Abbott and Costello comedy and color cartoons. In 1953, an Esquire toy matinee used donated Roy Rogers and Hopalong Cassidy films and sent collected toys to Goodwill Industries.

During World War II, the Esquire joined a Denver theater campaign tied to kitchen-grease salvage. The campaign involved 35 Greater Denver theaters. Children could exchange one pound of waste kitchen grease for movie admission, and the grease-sale proceeds went to a Junior Red Cross Christmas fund for military hospitals. In the early 1950s, the Esquire ran Saturday kid matinees, Wednesday summer matinees, a children's fashion show, and an eighth-birthday event for the theater. In 1951, Spiller offered free Esquire passes to women who signed up for the WAVES or the Navy Nurse Corps during a local recruiting campaign. In 1954, she invited all Denver girls named Heidi to attend the film Heidi free of charge after seeing a newspaper photograph of three-year-old Denver resident Heidi Vincent. The film had a very strong showing at the theater.

In 1953, Spiller joined other Fox managers in a Gates Rubber Company safety contest covering 4,500 employees. Fox theaters supplied $6,480 (equivalent to $77,978 in 2025) in ticket books through a program involving nine Denver Fox theaters and managers including Spiller, Harvey Gollogher of the Bluebird, and Earl Goldsworth.

== Robbery and burglary incidents ==
During her tenure as manager, the theater and its staff were targeted in four reported crimes. On September 4, 1946, the Esquire was robbed. During that incident, a gunman used a woman as a shield during the holdup and had forced her to drive him to the theater. In August 1951, an armed man entered the Esquire lobby and ordered an usher to take him to the manager. Spiller refused to leave her office and the robber then forced the usher and Spiller to open the office door and took about $110 (equivalent to $1,334 in 2025). In May 1954, there was an armed stickup at the theater in which a man took $50 (equivalent to $599 in 2025) from employees. Another burglary followed in August 1954.

== Award and later role ==
In October 1953, Spiller received the Clayton Long Trophy, the highest award in the Fox-Intermountain Theaters organization. Company president Frank H. Ricketson Jr. presented the trophy. The trophy was given for recognition of good housekeeping, safety and management. The Esquire staff had won the Frank H. Ricketson Jr. courtesy plaque for the Denver district for the seventh time in 1947 and the tenth successive time in 1949. Spiller credited Fox's charm-school course for its Denver usherettes performance, saying the girls had improved in posture and poise.

Spiller managed the Esquire from 1942 to 1954 and later served as personnel manager for the Denver and Centre theaters. In November 1954, around the time Spiller left single-house management, Fox-Intermountain formally repositioned the Esquire as a division showplace for unusual and international films.

== Death ==
Spiller died in Denver on October 22, 1957 following a long illness and a heart attack. She was 43 years old. Services were held at Howard Mortuary with cremation following at Tower of Memories. She was survived by her mother, Maude Spiller, and her sisters Mildred Spiller and Mrs. Charles Jeffers, all of Denver. The family requested memorial gifts to the Colorado Heart Fund in lieu of flowers.

== See also ==
- Esquire Theatre (Denver)
- Fox Intermountain Theatres
- Women in film
