= Charles Gates Jr. =

Charles Cassius Gates Jr. (May 27, 1921 – August 28, 2005) was a businessman and philanthropist. His father, Charles Gates Sr., bought Colorado Tire & Leather for $3,500 in 1911. The company was renamed The Gates Rubber Company in 1919. It became world's largest non-tire rubber manufacturer. Charles Gates Jr. took over in 1961, upon the death of his father. The Gates Corporation continued to grow, diversify, and acquire other companies, including Learjet. By 1996, the privately held Gates Corporation employed over 14,000 people. It was sold to London-based Tomkins plc that year for US$1.1 billion.

Charles C. Gates Jr. was trustee emeritus of the Gates Family Foundation, a large, Colorado-based charitable organization that has distributed over $147 million in grants over its 60-year history. He also sat on the boards of many other organizations, including the Denver Museum of Nature & Science, home to Gates Planetarium. He attended Graland Country Day School, class of 1934, and endowed the school to create an invention competition called the Gates Invention and Innovation Competition. His namesake event has been held annually since 2000.

Charles' uncle John Gates invented the V-belt in 1917, a staple component in all modern automotive and industrial applications.
