= Bluebird Theater =

Theater and live music venue in Denver, Colorado, U.S.

- Thompson Theater (1914-22)
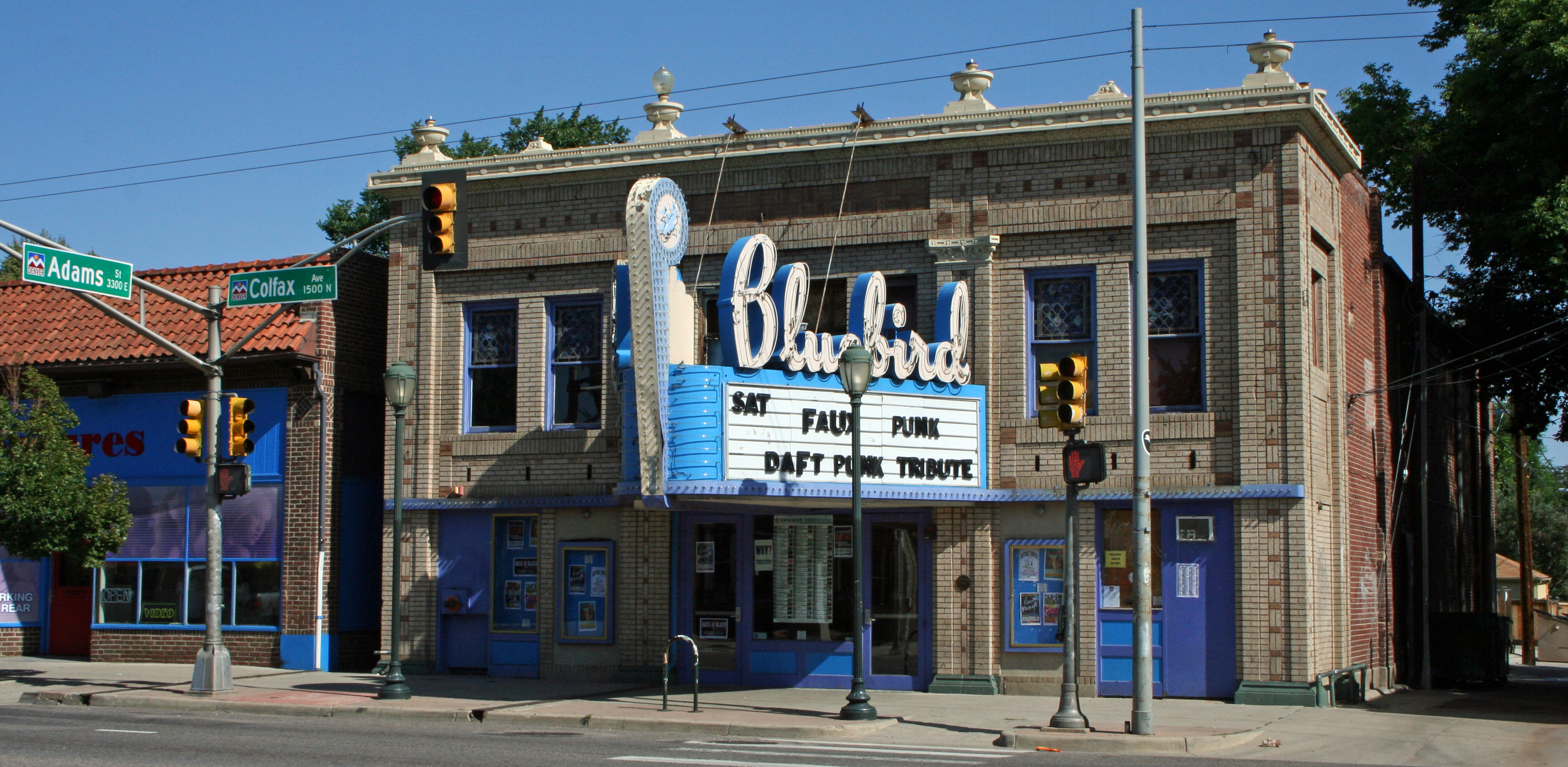
- Exterior of the venue (c. 2009)
- Interactive map of Bluebird Theater
- Address: 3317 E Colfax Ave; Denver, CO 80206-1713
- Location: City Park
- Coordinates: 39.740331°N 104.948391°W
- Owner: AEG Rocky Mountains
- Operator: AEG Live
- Capacity: 550

Construction
- Opened: July 1914
- Closed: 1987-94
- Reopened: 1994
- Architect: Harry W. J. Edbrooke

Website
- Venue Website
- Bluebird Theater
- U.S. National Register of Historic Places
- Area: less than one acre
- Architectural style: Late 19th and Early 20th Century American Movements
- NRHP reference No.: 97000018
- Added to NRHP: January 31, 1997

The Bluebird Theater (originally known as the Thompson Theater) is a theater in Denver, Colorado on East Colfax Avenue. The theater was designed by Harry W. J. Edbrooke and built during 1913–1914. It was renamed in 1922. It is currently used as a live music venue.

It was listed on the U.S. National Register of Historic Places in 1997.

== History ==
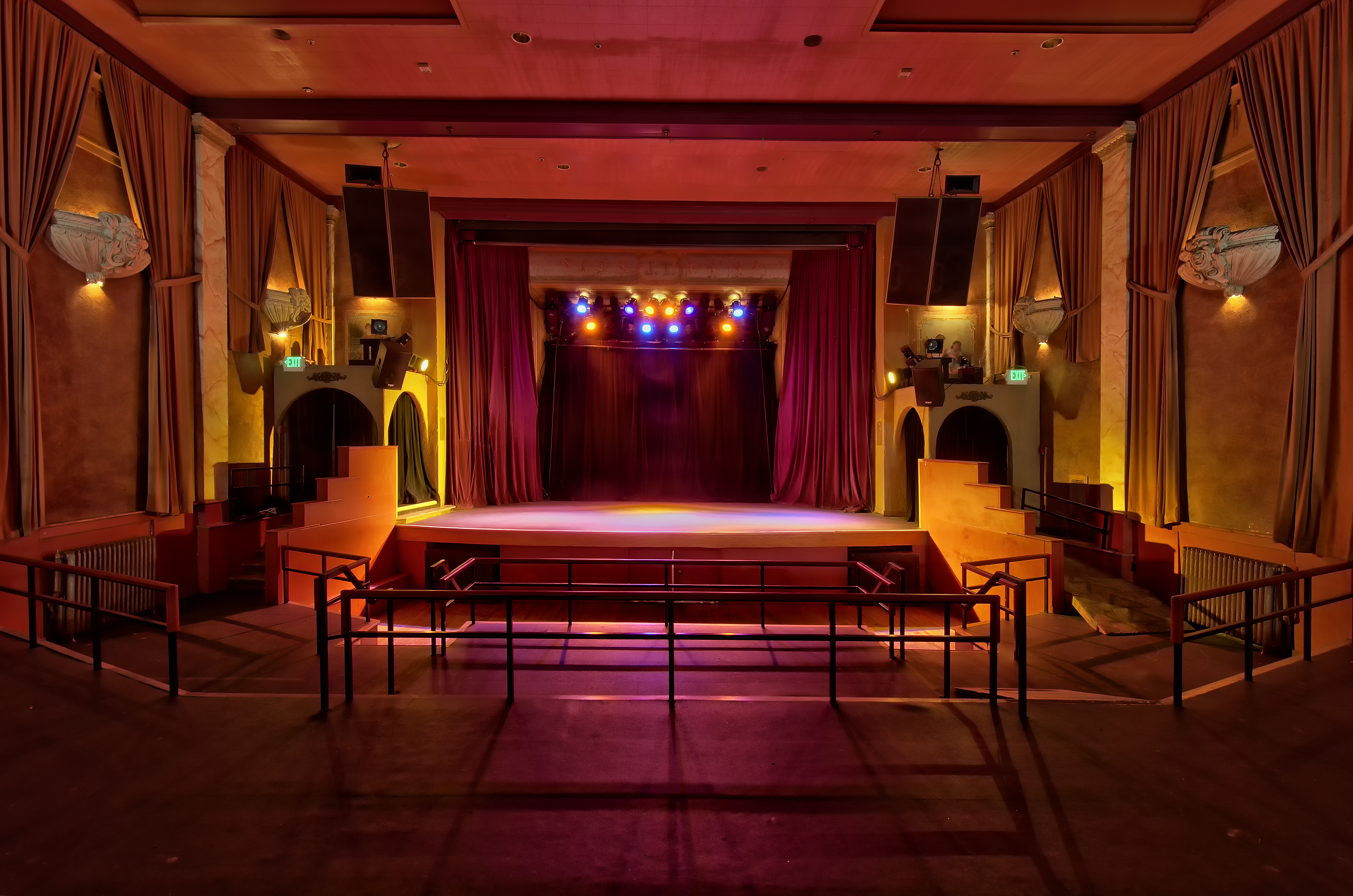
Interior view of the main hall and stage in 2011

The Bluebird Theater was built in 1913 and originally named after the prominent Denver grocer and druggist, John Thompson. The theater was renamed in 1922 and became an important part of the community.

During the Fox Intermountain Theaters era, the Bluebird was managed by Harvey Gollogher, who participated alongside Helen Spiller of the nearby Esquire Theatre in a corporate safety incentive program with the Gates Rubber Company that pooled ticket books from nine Denver Fox theaters for Gates' 4,500 employees. In 1949, the Bluebird and the Esquire held a joint holiday toy matinee, partnering with the Denver Santa Claus Shop, the Lions Club, and the American Legion, with films donated by Warner Bros. and Columbia Pictures. Denver historian Phil Goodstein wrote that the Hiawatha Theatre (later the Esquire) was built in 1927 "at the behest of John Thompson of the Bluebird," though contemporary sources identify Gordon B. Ashworth as the builder.

The theater was also initially a movie house and went through various phases over the years. In 1994, Chris Swank and Evan Dechtman invested in the Bluebird and it re-opened as a live music venue, as it remains today. The theater is laid out in tiers with a balcony overlooking the entire space. In 2006, AEG Live took over the Bluebird Theater and made significant upgrades.

== Noted performers ==
- Aaron Carter
- Adele
- Better Than Ezra
- Blaqk Audio
- Bowling for Soup
- Butch Walker
- Drive By Truckers
- Ed Sheeran
- Eric Hutchinson
- Faithless
- The Fratellis
- Father John Misty
- Grace VanderWaal
- Half Alive
- Hanson
- Havok (band)
- Herb Alpert
- Hot Chelle Rae
- Hot Hot Heat
- Kimbra
- Lindsey Stirling
- Lucero
- Lucinda Williams
- Macklemore & Ryan Lewis
- Manic Street Preachers
- Mutemath
- Needtobreathe
- Oasis
- Owl City
- Portugal. The Man
- Rooney
- Scissor Sisters
- Snow Patrol
- Stereophonics
- Tame Impala
- Twenty One Pilots
- Vampire Weekend
- Vio-lence
- Whiskeytown
- White Rabbits
- Yelawolf
- Jamie xx
