= Fox Intermountain Theatres =

Regional American movie-theater circuit

- Type: Regional theater circuit and division
- Industry: Motion-picture exhibition
- Predecessor: Fox Rocky Mountain operations
- Founded: 1930s
- Headquarters: Denver, Colorado, United States
- Area served: Intermountain West
- Key people: Frank H. Ricketson Jr. (a.k.a. Rick Ricketson)
- Parent: National Theatres

Fox Intermountain Theatres, also rendered Fox-Intermountain Theaters and Fox Inter-Mountain Theatres, was an American regional movie-theater circuit and division headquartered in Denver, Colorado. It operated Fox-affiliated theaters in Colorado and neighboring Rocky Mountain and Intermountain states.

The circuit was closely associated with theater executive Frank H. Ricketson Jr. (a.k.a. Rick Ricketson), who led Fox's Rocky Mountain operations in the 1930s and later became president of Fox-Intermountain Theaters. Robert W. Selig, who had begun as Ricketson's assistant, later headed the circuit as its president. Its Denver houses included downtown and neighborhood theaters, and the division later used the Esquire Theatre as the Denver flagship for a 1954 subscription art-film circuit that extended across twenty-five cities in seven states.

== Management districts ==
Fox's western theater operations were reorganized during the Depression after the Skouras brothers took over operation of Fox theaters in the region. In 1932 Rick Ricketson was appointed manager of the newly created Rocky Mountain division, covering the Montana and Rocky Mountain zones. The division was divided into three districts, with two headquartered in Denver and one in Butte, Montana. One district included Loveland, Longmont, Boulder, Fort Collins, and Sterling in Colorado; Cheyenne, Rawlins, Kemmerer, Rock Springs, and Sheridan in Wyoming; and McCook and Alliance in Nebraska. A second district included Denver, La Junta, Florence, Canon City, Walsenburg, Trinidad, Montrose, Delta, and Durango in Colorado, plus Las Vegas and Las Cruces in New Mexico. A third district included Butte, Great Falls, Lewistown, Billings, and Missoula in Montana, plus Pocatello and Idaho Falls in Idaho.

== Denver circuit ==
Fox Intermountain operated a Denver circuit that included both downtown first-run houses and neighborhood theaters. In 1937, managers of twelve Denver Fox theaters were honored at a luncheon marking Harry E. Huffman's twenty-five years in showmanship: the Denver, Aladdin, Broadway, Bluebird, Hiawatha, Paramount, Isis, Ogden, Mayan, Tabor, Rialto, and Webber. At the circuit's 1947 annual spring convention at the Brown Palace Hotel in Denver, managers were organized into four districts: Montana, Denver, southern, and northern. The Denver-district contingent included the managers of the Denver, Paramount, Tabor, Rialto, Mayan, Webber, Aurora, Bluebird, Aladdin, Ogden, and Esquire theaters.

Several of these houses had longer histories of their own: the Mayan Theater had opened in 1930, and the former Hiawatha Theatre, built in 1927, reopened in 1942 as the Esquire Theatre, which Fox-Intermountain operated as its Denver flagship. The Bluebird Theater, a Fox neighborhood house, later became a live-music venue.

== Promotions and management culture ==
Ricketson was one of the two central players behind Bank Night, a Depression-era cash-prize drawing franchised to theaters nationally through Affiliated Enterprises, Inc., a Denver company incorporated on November 16, 1933. No-par stock for that company was held in equal halves by Charles U. Yaeger and his wife and by Ricketson and his wife. Accounts of the promotion's origin differ. A 1938 Variety article frames Bank Night as Yaeger and Ricketson's joint creation, whereas History Colorado identifies Yaeger as its originator and describes Ricketson as Yaeger's partner. Ricketson's 1987 Denver Post obituary credited Ricketson alone. A federal postal fraud order against Affiliated Enterprises barred Yaeger and Ricketson from collecting royalties or conducting Bank Night business through postal mail. The proceedings had disclosed the promotion's substantial yields.

The division also used internal awards and courtesy campaigns to shape local theater management. The highest prize was the Clayton Long Trophy, awarded for safety, cleanliness and good management.

== Art-film circuit ==
In November 1954, Fox-Intermountain formally designated the Esquire Theatre in Denver as a "division showplace" for unusual films from outside the standard Hollywood program. The move began with the Western premiere of The Little Kidnappers, and the Esquire would serve as the flagship for a twenty-five-city, seven-state film-festival circuit. The programs were to be offered by subscription over twelve-week periods in cooperation with local civic groups, with early festival programs also named for Rawlins and Laramie, Wyoming, and La Junta, Colorado.

== Corporate history ==
Fox Intermountain was incorporated as the Fox Inter-Mountain Amusement Corporation and operated as one of the regional subsidiaries of National Theatres, the theatre-operating company controlled by 20th Century-Fox. A 1939 corporate chart listed it under National Theatres Amusement Co. alongside Fox West Coast, Fox Midwest, Fox Wisconsin, and Evergreen, with Frank H. Ricketson as its head. Charles Skouras became president of National Theatres in 1942 and led the company until his death in 1954.

Under the Paramount antitrust decrees, which required the major film companies to separate production and distribution from exhibition, the divestiture of the studios' theatre holdings was carried out through company-specific consent decrees, including provisions affecting 20th Century-Fox and National Theatres. 20th Century-Fox's theatre division was spun off as a separate corporation in 1951 with about 550 theatres and was ordered to dispose of roughly half of them within six years, leaving about 275 by 1957. After Skouras died in October 1954, he was succeeded as president of National Theatres by Elmer C. Rhoden, formerly head of its Fox Midwest circuit. By 1960 the company had been renamed National Theatres & Television, Inc., reflecting its expansion into television distribution through National Telefilm Associates. It was reorganized as National General Corporation in 1963, and its remaining 240 theatres were sold to Mann Theatres in 1973.

== See also ==
- Fox Theatres
