= Frank H. Ricketson Jr. =

American movie-theater executive and civic leader

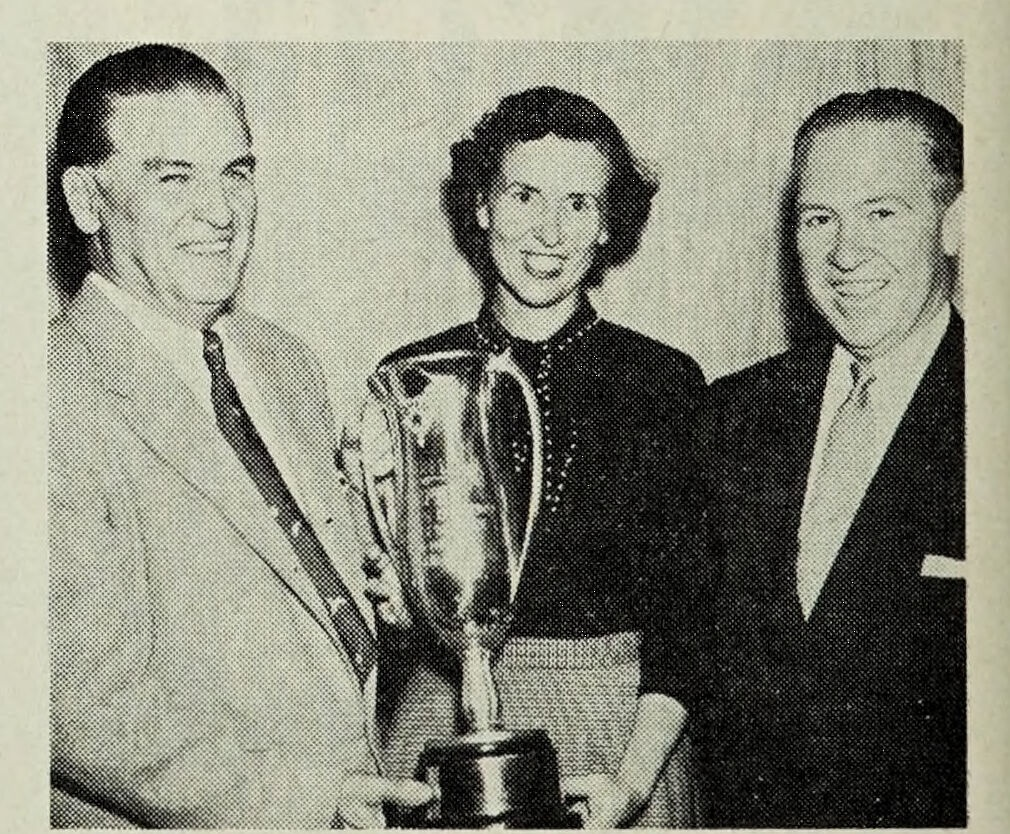
- Frank H. Ricketson Jr. (left) presents Helen Spiller (center), manager of the Esquire Theatre in Denver, the Clayton Long Trophy with Ray Davis, Denver city district manager (right), 1953.
- Born: Frank Henry Ricketson Jr. October 22, 1895; Leavenworth, Kansas, U.S.
- Died: June 18, 1987 (aged 91); Denver, Colorado, U.S.
- Education: University of Kentucky (B.A.), Westminster College of Law (law degree)
- Occupations: Movie-theater executive, author, civic leader
- Known for: Fox Intermountain Theatres, Bank Night, The Management of Motion Picture Theatres
- Spouse: Maizie Donnegan (m. 1920; died 1959)
- Children: 1

Frank Henry "Rick" Ricketson Jr. (October 22, 1895 – June 18, 1987) was an American movie-theater executive, author, and civic leader in Denver, Colorado. From 1934 to 1956 he was president of Fox Intermountain Theatres, a regional circuit of the National Theatres exhibition chain that he later headed as general manager, and he was associated with the Depression-era theater promotion Bank Night. Ricketson was inducted into the Colorado Business Hall of Fame as a 1993 laureate.

Ricketson wrote The Management of Motion Picture Theatres, published in 1938, a professional manual on motion-picture exhibition and theater operation.

== Early life and career ==
Ricketson was born in Leavenworth, Kansas, on October 22, 1895. He earned a bachelor's degree from the University of Kentucky, served as an Army lieutenant in World War I, and after the war earned a law degree from the Westminster College of Law, later part of the University of Denver College of Law. He worked his way through law school as a sportswriter, reporting for The Denver Express and then The Denver Post, where he wrote a column titled "Rick's Rackets" and succeeded Gene Fowler as sports editor in 1920. Later that year, he married Maizie Donnegan, the society editor of The Denver Post.

By 1923 he was the western exploitation representative for Famous Players–Lasky and a former manager of the Princess Theatre in Denver. That May, with his associate Dick Dickson, he leased the Dreamland and Empress theaters in Montrose, Colorado. Dickson and Ricketson also ran a film-delivery business known as D&R, and Ricketson built a theater of his own in Montrose in 1925. By 1929 the roughly 30 movie houses he operated had joined the Fox national chain. Charlie Yaeger, who Ricketson would work with later in his career, was a film-delivery truck driver for the D&R company.

Soon after, Ricketson joined the Hughes-Franklin circuit, controlled by Howard Hughes and Harold B. Franklin, and in 1931 was assigned to manage the Paramount and United Artists theaters in Los Angeles, after more than a decade in Denver theatrical circles.

== Fox Intermountain ==
Ricketson returned to Denver from Los Angeles in 1932 to take over divisional-manager duties for Fox Film in the Rocky Mountain region. Later that year he was appointed to head a newly created Rocky Mountain division spanning the Montana and Rocky Mountain zones, with district offices in Denver and Butte, Montana. Ricketson became president of Fox Intermountain Theatres in 1934, and remained as such until 1956. Fox Intermountain was part of the National Theatres circuit, which Ricketson later headed as general manager. He was also a shareholder in National Theatres and 20th Century-Fox.

By 1937 the circuit's twelve Denver houses were the Denver, Aladdin, Broadway, Bluebird, Hiawatha, Paramount, Isis, Ogden, Mayan, Tabor, Rialto, and Webber. By 1943 he held dual wartime posts as president of Fox Intermountain and head of the United War Chest, and that June he publicly denied rumors that he would give them up for an executive position with Twentieth Century-Fox. In 1953 Ricketson presented the Clayton Long Trophy (the highest award in the Fox Intermountain organization) to Helen Jean Spiller, manager of the Esquire Theatre.

== Bank Night ==
Bank Night was a Depression-era theater promotion built around a weekly cash-prize drawing. It was designed to draw audiences back to the movies during a slump in the early 1930s. Credit for originating Bank Night has been given inconsistently. The Board of Tax Appeals' findings call Yaeger the deviser, and Ricketson his assistant. Variety referred to it as "Yaeger-Ricketson's Bank Night" and credited both as originators. History Colorado credits the idea to Yaeger while casting Ricketson as a partner. The two men's obituaries each emphasized their own role. The Rocky Mountain News obituary called Yaeger the originator in 1977, while obituaries of Ricketson in 1987 credited him with inventing the promotion. Affiliated Enterprises, Inc., the Denver company that licensed the promotion to theaters nationwide, was founded by both Ricketson and Yaeger. It was incorporated in Colorado on November 16, 1933, with 100 shares issued to each of Ricketson and Yaeger, and in November 1934 their wives, Maizie Ricketson and Clover Yaeger, each took 100 more, leaving the two couples roughly equal owners.

Affiliated Enterprises was profitable. Its net income rose from about $25,000 (equivalent to $601,679 in 2025) in 1934 to roughly $159,000 (equivalent to $3,733,799 in 2025) in 1935, and nearly $400,000 (equivalent to $9,280,576 in 2025) in 1936. The promotion, however, faced legal challenges, and the company spent heavily defending theater operators in court. On April 14, 1938, the Post Office Department issued a fraud order that barred Affiliated Enterprises from using the mail, ending its licensing of the system. The order, signed by Postmaster General James Farley, would stop Yaeger and Ricketson from collecting royalties or conducting Bank Night business by mail.

== Additional business, civic and philanthropic activities ==
Ricketson was active in Denver's civic and cultural life for more than half a century, most prominently with the Central City Opera. He joined the effort to revive the opera soon after its 1932 founding. Elected president of the Central City Opera House Association in 1943, he led the association for 26 years, serving as chairman from 1949 to 1969. In 1956 he commissioned the opera The Ballad of Baby Doe, which had its world premiere at Central City. He was a trustee or director of the Denver Center for the Performing Arts, the National Western Stock Show, the Denver Museum of Natural History, the University of Denver, Loretto Heights College, and the Bonfils Foundation. In 1948 he founded the Roundup Riders of the Rockies, a riding club known for its annual week-long trail ride in the Colorado mountains.

Ricketson also served as a director of United Banks of Colorado, the Public Service Company of Colorado, Continental Airlines, and Cheyenne Newspapers.

Ricketson was named the 1980 Citizen of the West by the March of Dimes. Ahead of the award, then Colorado Governor Dick Lamm proclaimed January 9, 1980, "Frank H. Ricketson Jr. Day." The Ricketson Theatre at the Denver Center for the Performing Arts was named for him, though in 2018 the center announced that it would be renamed the Singleton Theatre in recognition of a gift from former Denver Post publisher and owner William Dean Singleton.

In his will, Ricketson left $7 million (equivalent to $19,837,434 in 2025) to the University of Denver's law school. The bequest was divided into two funds: one supporting law-school programs, and another invested for later use. The second grew to about $12 million (equivalent to $20,454,545 in 2025) and, with proceeds from the sale of the former Park Hill law campus, helped finance a $63.5 million (equivalent to $108,238,636 in 2025) law building. The Frank H. Ricketson Jr. Law Building was dedicated on April 2, 2004.

== Death ==
Ricketson died of a heart attack on June 18, 1987, at St. Joseph Hospital in Denver, at the age of 91. A Roman Catholic, he was buried at Mount Olivet Cemetery.

== See also ==
- Fox Theatres
