= Screeno =

Bingo game played in movie theaters

Screeno (a portmanteau of "screen bingo" or "screen keno") was a form of bingo played in American movie theaters during the Great Depression of the 1930s. To bolster attendance on slow weeknights, the neighborhood movie houses would feature the game in which audience members would have a chance to win cash prizes. The story is that many a theater was saved from bankruptcy by the advent of screeno. The game was played between the two main movie features.

A number dial and a giant spinning needle were projected onto the movie screen. Patrons were provided with toothpicks to punch out the winning numbers on their cards. Apparently, on most nights patrons paid a modest fee for their cards, but one night a week was designated as "bank night" in which the audience would get free screeno cards with their movie tickets. A 1937 romantic-comedic-musical movie titled Thrill of a Lifetime featured a song called “Keno, Screeno and You.”

In 1937 Fiorello La Guardia, mayor of New York City, tried to have screeno banned as part of his anti-gambling crusade that also targeted pinball and bingo in the city. His efforts were blocked by the courts.

== See also ==
- Bank Night
