= Clayton Long Trophy =

Theater-management award given by Fox Intermountain

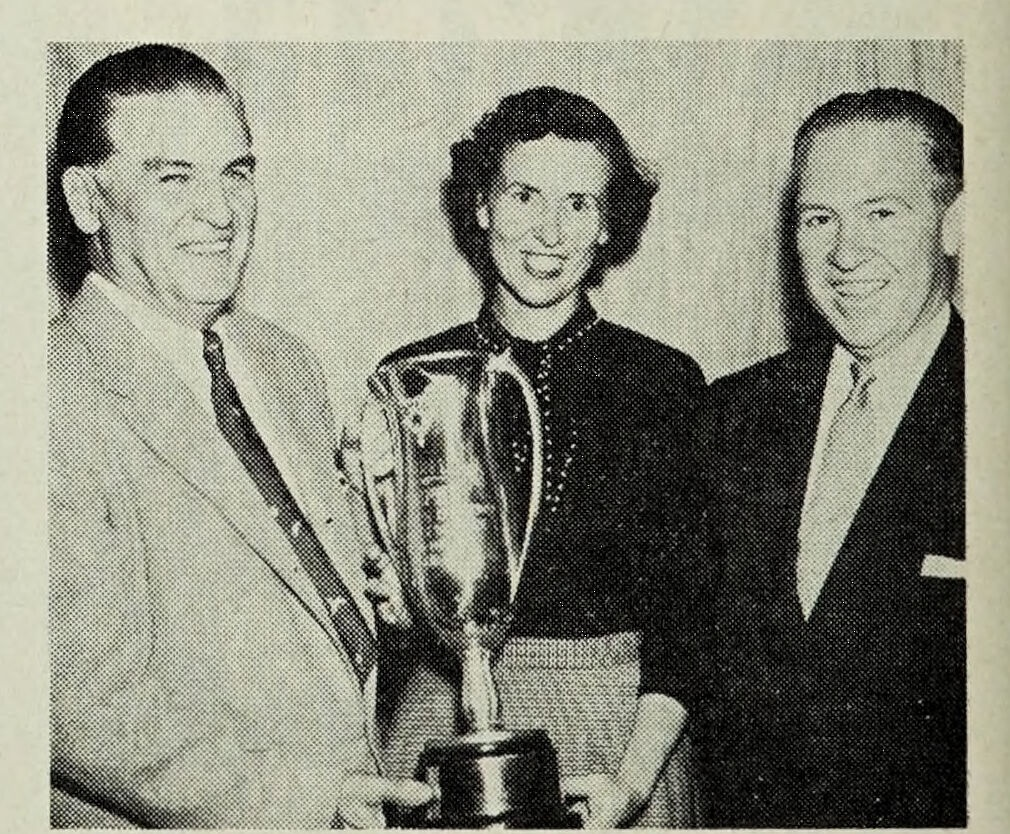
- Helen Spiller, manager of the Esquire Theatre in Denver, receiving the Clayton Long Trophy from Frank H. Ricketson Jr. (left), president of Fox Intermountain Theatres, with Ray Davis, Denver city district manager (right), 1953.
- Description: Theatre management in the Fox Intermountain Theatres
- Country: United States
- Presented by: Fox Intermountain Theatres (Frank H. Ricketson Jr.)
- Reward: 27-inch silver loving cup
- First award: 1934
- Final award: 1961

The Clayton Long Trophy was an internal theater-management award given by the Fox Intermountain theater circuit. It was established as a tribute to for Clayton Long, a theater manager who worked for Fox, by Frank H. Ricketson Jr. (a.k.a. Rick Ricketson). The physical trophy was a 27-inch silver loving cup. Competition for the award occurred between Fox theaters in seven states: Colorado, New Mexico, Wyoming, Nebraska, Utah, Idaho, and Montana.

The first recipients of the trophy were Fox employees in Missoula, Montana, who won it in a safety-service contest that ended December 23, 1934. The cup was displayed in the lobby of the Fox-Wilma theater in Missoula and with the inscription: "Emblematic of efficiency in safety service to the public." Insurance and safety professionals supplied reports to the Fox organization as the basis for the awards.

By the late 1930s the criteria broadened from safety to general operation. The judging covered personnel, management, efficiency, cleanliness, safety, courtesy, public popularity, and loyalty. The trophy did not have a fixed presentation schedule, and was presented on an ad-hoc basis. Recipients included city managers and house managers.

== Clayton Long ==
Clayton Long had a long career in managing movie theaters. In February 1934, Long, formerly a house manager of a Los Angeles theater, became manager of the Imperial Theatre in Alliance, Nebraska, a Fox West Coast house. In July of that year Long, age 30, had died of tuberculosis. He had gone to the coast a few months earlier for his health. Long had begun as an usher at the Metropolitan in Los Angeles, risen over eight years to house manager, and then managed the United Artists Downtown theater after Paramount acquired it, before going to Nebraska about two years before his death. Long was often praised for his theater management expertise and practice.

== Award system ==
Through the 1940s and early 1950s, the trophy appeared alongside other Fox Intermountain operating awards, including courtesy plaques. Maintenance was the primary factor, though other branches of management were considered, and inspections covered theaters from roof to basement. A parallel courtesy plaque award ran alongside the trophy. The Esquire Theatre in Denver won permanent possession of a courtesy plaque after receiving it three times.

== List of trophy winners ==
- 1934: E.K. Taylor, manager of Fox-Wilma theater, Missoula, Montana.
- 1938: H.A. Goodridge, manager of Ogden Theatre, Denver, Colorado.
- 1946: Mike Zalesny, manager of the Serf, Coronado and Kiva theaters in Las Vegas and New Mexico.
- 1947: Chet E. Miller, manager of theaters in Denver, Colorado.
- 1948: John Denman, manager of the Mayan Theater in Denver, Colorado.
- 1951: Henry J. Westerfield, manager of theaters in Trinidad, Colorado.
- 1953: Helen Jean Spiller, manager of Esquire Theatre, Denver, Colorado.
- 1958: Alan Bamossy, manager of theaters in Great Falls, Montana.
- 1961: John B. Tella, manager of theaters in Butte, Montana.

== See also ==
- Fox Theatres
- Fox Intermountain Theatres
