= Par value =

Stated value or face value of a financial instrument

In finance and accounting, par value means stated value or face value of a financial instrument. Expressions derived from this term include at par (equal to par value), above par (greater than par value), below par (smaller than par value) and no-par (has no par value).

== Bonds ==
A bond selling at par is priced at 100% of face value. Par can also refer to a bond's original issue value or its value upon redemption at maturity.

== Stock ==
The par value of stock has no relation to market value and, as a concept, is somewhat archaic by the 21st century. The par value of a share is the value stated in the corporate charter below which shares of that class cannot be sold upon initial offering; the issuing company promises not to issue further shares below par value, so investors can be confident that no one else will receive a more favorable issue price. Thus, par value is the nominal value of a security which is determined by the issuing company to be its minimum price. This was far more important in unregulated equity markets than in the regulated markets that exist today, where stock issuance prices must usually be published. The par value of stock remains unchanged in a bonus stock issue but it changes in a stock split.

In accounting, the par value allows the company to put a de minimis value for the stock on the company's financial statement. Par value is also used to calculate legal capital or share capital.

Many common stocks issued today do not have par values; those that do (usually only in jurisdictions where par values are required by law) have extremely low par values (often the smallest unit of currency in circulation), for example a penny (USD0.01) par value on a stock issued at USD25.00/share. Most jurisdictions do not allow a company to issue stock below par value.

Even in jurisdictions that permit the issue of stock with no par value, the par value of a stock may affect its tax treatment. For example, Delaware permits the issue of stock either with or without a par value, but by choosing to assign a par value, a corporation may significantly reduce its franchise tax liability.

No-par stocks have "no par value" printed on their certificates. Instead of par value, some U.S. states allow no-par stocks to have a stated value, set by the board of directors of the corporation, which serves the same purpose as par value in setting the minimum legal capital that the corporation must have after paying any dividends or buying back its stock.

Also, par value still matters for a callable common stock: the call price is usually either par value or a small fixed percentage over par value.

The shares in a corporation may be issued partly paid, which renders the owner of those shares liability to the corporation for any calls on those shares up to the par value of the shares.

== Currency ==
The term "at par" is also used when two currencies are exchanged at equal value (for instance, in 1964, Trinidad and Tobago switched from the British West Indies dollar to the new Trinidad and Tobago dollar, and that switch was "at par", meaning that the Central Bank of Trinidad and Tobago replaced each old dollar with a new one).

Par value also refers to the official gold content of a currency. The Act to Amend the Par Value Modification Act of 1973 of September 21, 1973 lowered the par value of the dollar against gold from $38 to $42.2222 where it remains today. This is why the face value of a 1 oz gold coin is $50, reflecting the par value of the dollar in gold.

== See also ==
- Pull to par
- Watered stock
