= No-par stock =

No-par stock is stock issued with no par value given in the articles of incorporation or stock certificate. This is in contrast to stocks issued with a par value - a value for which the stock is redeemable to the issuing company - set at the time of issuance.

In practice, the par value is the lowest price for which a stock can be sold, as prices lower than the par value would be redeemed to the issuing company. In contrast, the value of no-par stocks relies completely on the market, without this minimum price guarantee.

Traditionally, the par value is set to be the same as the amount invested. However, in modern practice, the par value is set to a very low value (e.g. US$0.01 or US$0.00001) or not set at all. Certain jurisdictions (e.g. Hong Kong) have adopted a mandatory system of no-par stocks for all locally-registered companies.

Some U.S. states (e.g. California) does not have the concept of par values, whilst some other U.S. states (e.g. Delaware) does. In the latter states, whether the stock is par or no-par affects the calculation of the annual franchise tax.

== See also ==
- Corporation
- Incorporation
- Share capital
- Par value
