= Half Alive =

Half Alive may refer to:

- Half Alive (band), an American band from Long Beach, California
- Half Alive (album), a 1981 compilation album by Suicide
- Half-Alive, a 1998 live album by Helix
