= Gates Family Foundation =

Philanthropic organization

- Formation: 1946
- Type: Philanthropic organization
- Headquarters: Denver, Colorado, U.S.
- President: Thomas A. Gougeon
- Key people: Beth Conover; Laia C. Mitchell; Russell Schnitzer; Mary Seawell
- Revenue: $67,158,457 (2018)
- Expenses: $25,114,405 (2018)
- Website: www.gatesfamilyfoundation.org

The Gates Family Foundation is one of the largest philanthropic organizations in Colorado, based in Denver.

== Background ==
Founded in 1946, the Foundation currently has net assets of approximately $500 million. In 2007, the Foundation paid roughly $20 million in grants, all of which went to Colorado recipients.

The source of the original endowment is the Gates Rubber Company of Denver, Colorado.

The Foundation is well known in Denver, for example including the Gates Planetarium at the Denver Museum of Nature and Science.

In May 2022, The Gates Family Foundation announced a $200 million donation and collaboration project with the University of Colorado Anschutz. The Donation is to establish a medical research institute at the university's Anschutz Medical Campus and is to be funded over five years by the Gates Family Foundation.

== Assets and funding details ==
As of 2018 the Gates Family Foundation had assets of $361,589,256.

Funding details as of 2018:
Revenue and support as of 2018: $67,158,457
1. Net gain from sale of assets (70.7%)
2. Contributions, Gifts, Grants (20.0%)
3. Interest and dividends (6.70%)
4. Other income (2.60%)
Expenses as of 2018: $25,114,405
1. Contributions, Gifts, Grants (81.3%)
2. Operating and administrative expenses (14.5%)
3. Taxes (4.20%)
