= Bank Night =

1930s US lottery franchise

Bank Night was a lottery game franchise in the United States during the Great Depression. It was invented and marketed by Charles U. Yaeger, a former booking agent for 20th Century Fox.

In 1936, Bank Night was played at 5,000 of America's 15,000 active theaters, and copies of it were played at countless more. The popularity of Bank Night and similar schemes contributed to the resiliency of the film industry during the Great Depression more than any other single business tactic.

== Operation ==
Bank Night was run as a franchise which was leased to theaters for from $5 to $50 a week, depending on their size. The payment entitled the owner to run an event called Bank Night, and each owner was given a film reel with a Bank Night trailer, as well as a registration book and equipment to draw numbers to pick winners.

Anyone could enter his or her name in a book kept by the theater manager, and on Bank Night, a name would be drawn at random. The person selected must reach the stage within a set amount of time to claim their prize, usually a few minutes (they would not be required to purchase a ticket to enter the theater). While not technically requiring any purchase, and thus circumventing the numerous local lottery laws of the time, Bank Night had the effect of drawing people to theaters, many of whom bought tickets anyway.

== History ==
Yeager invented Bank Night in 1931 in Denver, Colorado. The concept was immediately successful. Although lucrative, the franchise faced scrutiny from state and municipal authorities, who often challenged theaters in court for holding Bank Nights. It quickly spawned copycats to get around the franchise fee, such as Prosperity Night, Treasure Night and Movie Sweepstakes.

An example was the sweepstakes held at the Palace Theatre in Marion, Ohio. Starting May 7, 1936, the Palace held a weekly, Wednesday night sweepstakes. Patrons were given a free sweepstakes ticket when a Wednesday matinee movie ticket was purchased. Also, any adult who wanted to participate in the Wednesday night drawing could simply stop by the theater and register. It was not necessary to purchase a movie ticket or to be inside the theater when the winner was announced. Each participant received a ticket with the name of a horse. On the Palace stage, a drawing was made in which the names of 20 horses were picked from a huge wire hopper. Once announced, each horse name was placed on a blackboard opposite one of 20 numbers. Then, four films were carried to the stage, each of them showing 20 horses in a race. Someone chose a film and it was taken to the projection booth, and the film was shown. Each horse had a number, and the audience watched the race. The order of finish determined the winner of the first ($200), second ($10) and third ($5) prizes. If the winner was not in the theater the prize accumulated for the next week. The legality of the popular sweepstakes was challenged by a local prosecutor under Ohio's anti-lottery rules after a Keystone Cops-like raid on the theater during a performance. The prosecutor's legal theory was rejected by the jury and the theater management immediately reinstated the sweepstakes.

The fad lost much of its popularity by the late 1930s, first to competing games such as Screeno and other lottery-like games, but popularity further declined as cities such as Chicago and New York City took stances against Bank Night and similar games in 1936, and soon theater owners in many jurisdictions faced arrest or fines for running Bank Nights. The improving economy and World War II also contributed to changing consumer tastes.

Bank Night was the plot of the 1936 Charley Chase short Neighborhood House. Bank Nights were jokingly referenced in the films After the Thin Man (1936) and Calling All Husbands (1940). It is also mentioned in at least two Warner Brothers cartoons directed by Tex Avery: A Day at the Zoo and Thugs with Dirty Mugs (both released in 1939). Bank Nights were also humorously referenced in the Hope/Crosby film Road to Singapore (1940) and the 1939 film adaptation of the Rodgers and Hart musical On Your Toes.
