= Gates Corporation =

American manufacturer of power products

Gates Industrial Corporation plc
- Type: Public
- Traded as: NYSE: GTES; Russell 1000 component; S&P 600 component
- Founded: 1911; 115 years ago
- Headquarters: Denver, Colorado, U.S.
- Revenue: ▲US$3.44 billion (2025)
- Net income: ▲US$251 million (2025)
- Number of employees: 15,050 (January 1, 2022)
- Website: gates.com

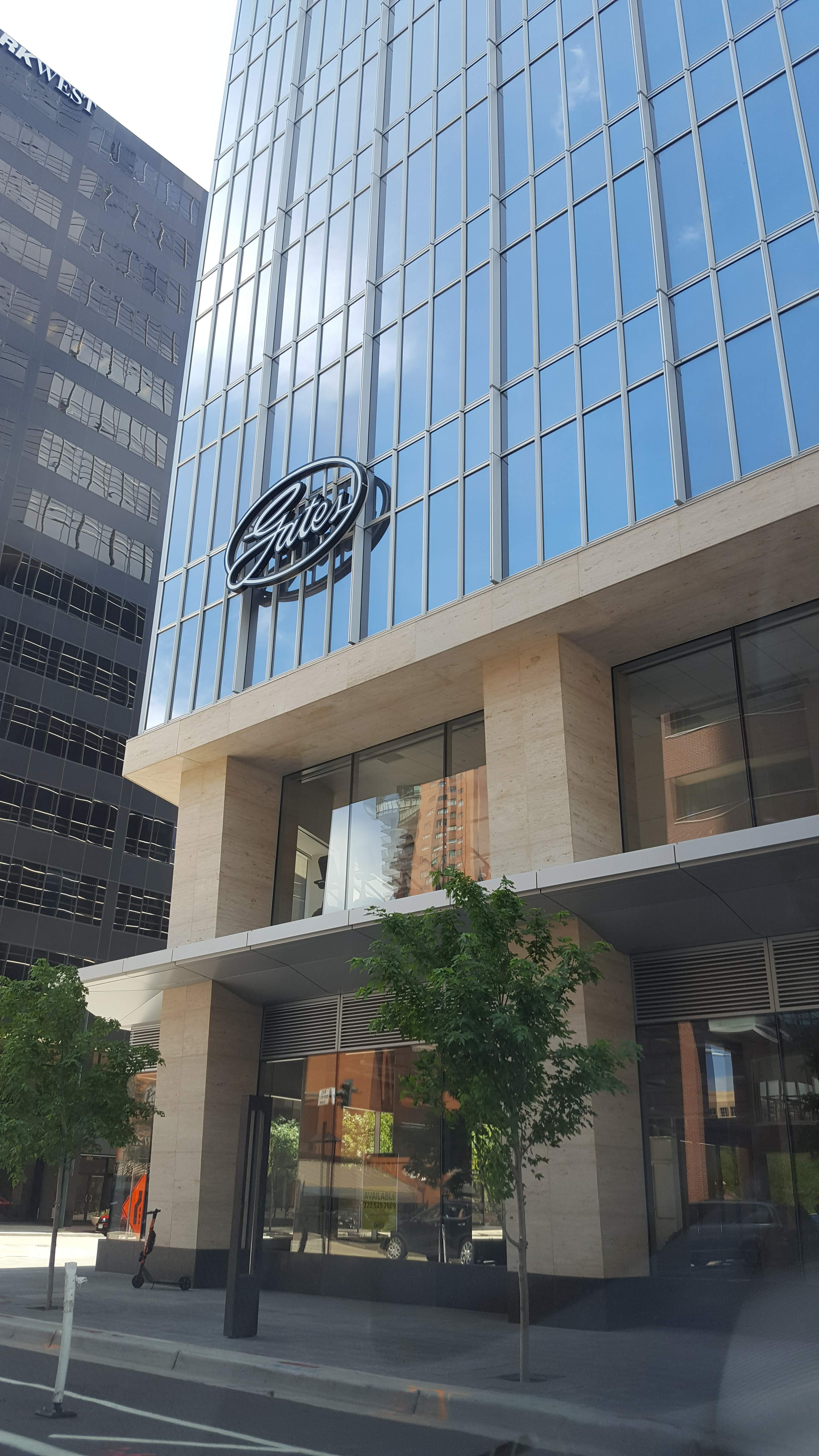
Gates Corporation sign at company headquarters in 1144 Fifteenth, Denver, Colorado

Gates Industrial Corporation plc, based in Denver, Colorado, is a manufacturer of power transmission belts and fluid power products, which are used in diverse industrial and automotive applications. The company employs over 15,000 and has sales and manufacturing operations in North and South America, Europe, Asia, Australia, and the Middle East.

== History ==
On October 1, 1911, Charles Gates Sr. purchased the Colorado Tire and Leather Company located in Denver, Colorado beside the South Platte River. Colorado Tire and Leather Company made a single product, the Durable Tread, a steel-studded band of leather that motorists attached to tires to extend their mileage. In 1917, the company began phasing out leather in favor of rubber and Charles Gates changed its name to the International Rubber Company.

That same year, John Gates, Charles's brother, developed a belt made of rubber and woven threading called a V-belt, due to its shape. It replaced the hemp and rope belt used on automobiles and industrial machinery at the time, and was a model for the common serpentine belt. The belt's success propelled the company to become the largest manufacturer of V-belts, a title it still holds.

In 1919, the International Rubber Company changed its name to the Gates Rubber Company. Gates continued its expansion across the United States, opening more factories and hiring thousands of people. Then, in 1954, its first international manufacturing facility was built in Brantford, Ontario, Canada. Expansion to other countries followed. In 1958, the company opened Gates Rubber de Mexico. In 1963, Gates built a belt and hose plant in Erembodegem, Belgium, the first of many European facilities.

In the 1980s, Gates expanded when it acquired the Uniroyal Power Transmission Company and became the world's largest synchronous/timing belt manufacturer, firmly establishing its growth path in the Asia-Pacific region.

In 1996, the company was acquired by the British-based engineering firm Tomkins plc, ending 85 years of family ownership. In 2003, Gates changed its name to The Gates Corporation, a move reflecting the company's expanding range of industrial brands, product lines, and customers. The Denver factory closed, and by 2001, some buildings hadn't been used in nearly a decade. Asbestos contaminated the buildings and trichloroethylene in the groundwater was still under remediation in late 2014. While parts of the property had been redeveloped, the original factory remained deserted until November 2013, when demolition of the final factory buildings began. The site was purchased by Denver-based Frontier Renewal in September 2014 with the intention of completing the cleanup and preparing it for future development.

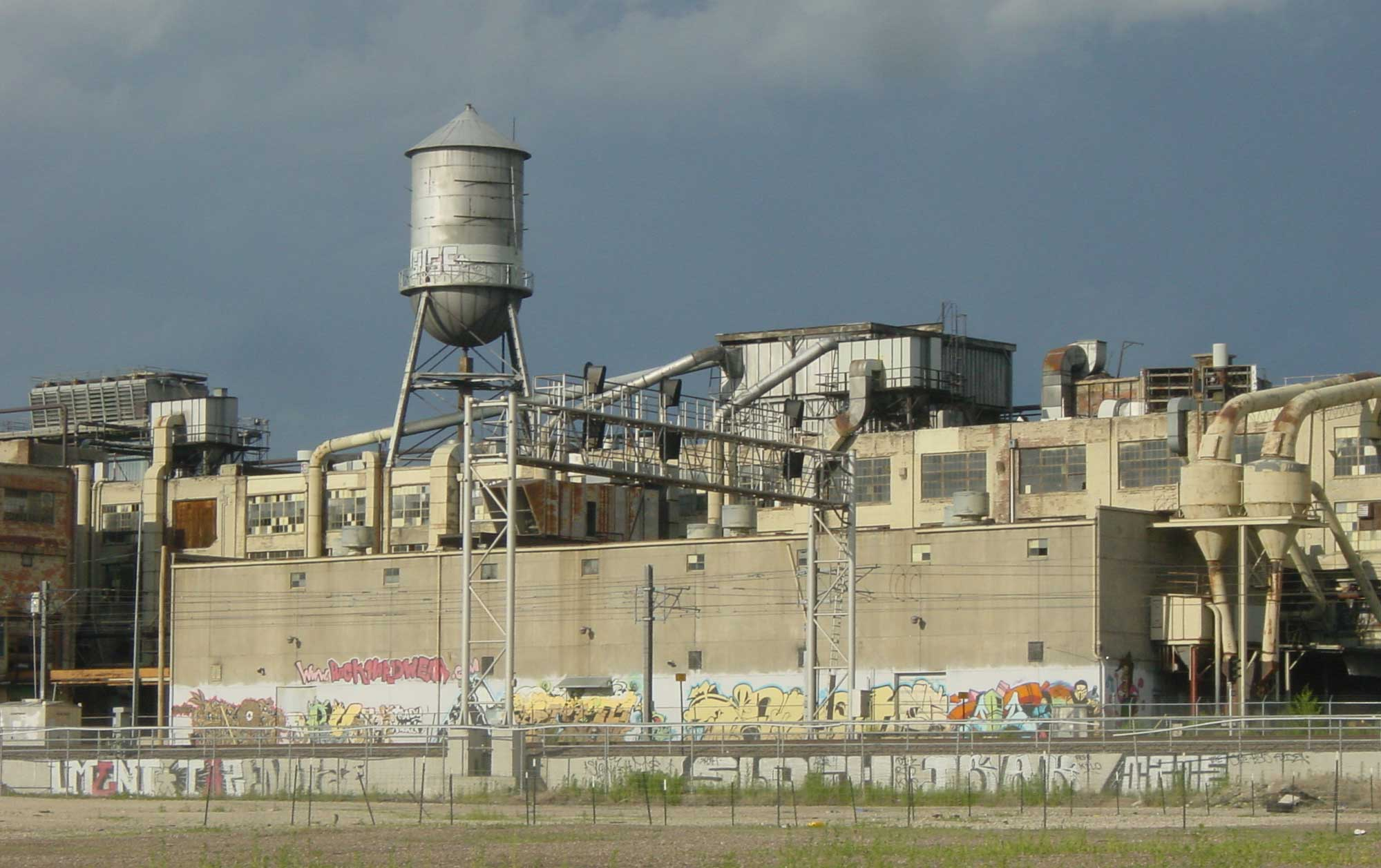
The former Gates Rubber factory, for many years a Denver landmark, was demolished in 2014.

In July 2010 Tomkins was acquired by a Canadian consortium of private equity firm Onex Corporation and the Canada Pension Plan Investment Board for £2.9 billion. In July 2014, The Blackstone Group, the world's largest buyout firm, agreed to acquire The Gates Corporation from Onex Corp. (OCX) and Canada Pension Plan Investment Board for $5.4 billion. In December 2017, Gates Corporation filed an initial public offering and became a public corporation.

In November 2026, Gates and Japan's Nitta Corporation agreed to end their 40-year partnership. Under the agreement, Gates would acquire Nitta's stakes in their power transmission businesses in China, India, Singapore, South Korea and Thailand. Nitta would buy Gates's 51% stake in their Japanese toothed belt manufacturer, Gates Unitta Asia, for approximately US$131 million.

== Products, services ==
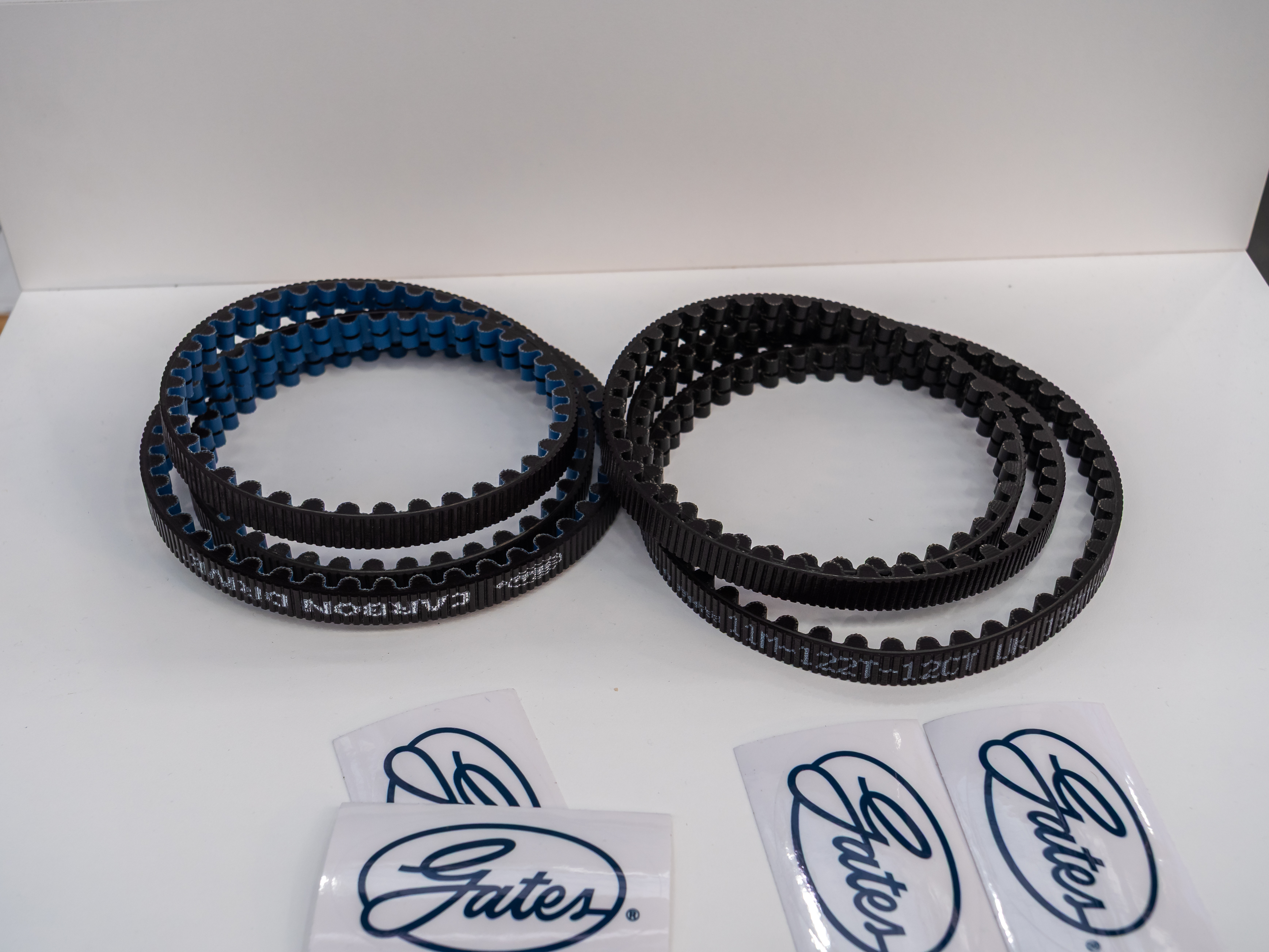
Gates driving belts for cycles

Gates designs and manufactures industrial belt, hose and hydraulic products for various industries:

- Energy, exploration and extraction: Products and services for the energy, marine, mining, oil and gas, and oil refining industries.
- Infrastructure & Agriculture: Heavy-duty applications, including construction, agriculture, logging, and material handling.
- Transportation: New build and replacement products for fleet and heavy-duty vehicles, freight, towables, and rail applications.
- Automotive: OEM automotive aftermarket products for cars, light trucks, and snowmobile, sport, fleet, and heavy-duty vehicles.
- Bicycles: Carbon belt drives as replacements for bicycle chains.
- Process and specialty: Hoses and belts for products used in homes, offices, laboratories, food processing plants.

== See also ==
- Charles Gates, Jr.
- Gates Family Foundation
- Serpentine belt
