= Junius R. Lewis =

Junius R. Lewis (c. 1842–1938) was born into slavery in Mississippi and he ran away in 1862 after his mother was sold. A Confederate officer captured him in Kentucky after he walked north from the plantation. He became a servant to Generals in Virginia during the American Civil War. He was an orderly to E. E. Johnson of the Confederate States Army.

He tried to find his mother in Mississippi. They went to Texas in 1870, where he was a teacher. He homesteaded near Burkburnett, Texas, but lost the property when he was unable to pay the taxes. He was a porter for the Pullman Palace Car Company beginning in 1882. In 1892, he was sent to Fort Worth and Denver Railway to run the Denver office. He became a miner and then by the Golden Chest Mining, Milling, and Tunnel Company's president in Boulder County, Colorado. He worked for the organization from 1903 to 1915. During that time, the company was not always able to pay his salary and he was given title in 1907 to the Golden Chest lode. He lived near his mines in Boulder County.

He was half-owner of Golden Chest and Canton Lodes in 1901. He became half-owner of other lodes through 1916 and three years later became the owner of lodes he had been part-owner. He moved to Denver in 1921. Unable to pay taxes for his mining property, it was sold to Boulder County.

His friends included Joseph Westbrook and Oliver Toussaint Jackson. He was also a friend of the first black man to graduate from the University of Colorado with a medical doctorate degree, Dr. P. E. Spratlin. He had no known living relatives and he never married.

He applied for an Old Age Pension in 1933. Until 1935, he spent years fighting over property and income. He died on July 16, 1938, at Denver General Hospital.

== See also ==
- History of slavery in Colorado
- List of African American pioneers of Colorado
