= Edward J. Sanderlin =

American entrepreneur and investor (1835–1909)

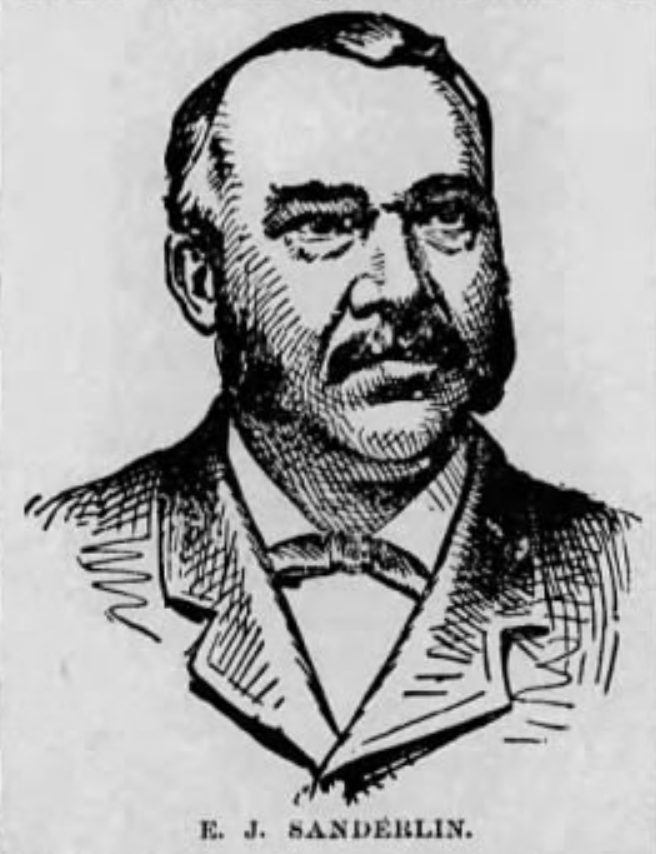
- Born: September 14, 1835 (Note: He is also said to have been born in 1832 in Memphis, Tennessee, in his obituary. The 1870 census of Colorado Territory shows that he was born in Tennessee, but born about 1837. In 1890, Sanderlin stated that he was born in 1836 in New Orleans.); New Orleans, Louisiana
- Died: April 15, 1909 (aged 73); Denver, Colorado
- Occupations: Entrepreneur, investor
- Years active: 1852–1890

Edward J. Sanderlin (September 14, 1835 – April 15, 1909) was born into slavery. He was in Cincinnati by 1850, where he attended the Gilmore School. He took part in the California Gold Rush and the Pike's Peak Gold Rush in Colorado. He operated a barbershop and restaurant in Denver in its early frontier days. He became a wealthy businessman and investor in mines in Colorado and California.

Sanderlin fought for voting rights for African American males by lobbying at the local, territorial, and federal levels. He was among those who argued that Colorado should not become a state until all males could vote. Sanderlin negotiated for education for black children. He was inducted into the Blacks in Colorado Hall of Fame in 1973.

== Early life ==
Sanderlin was born on September 14, 1835, in New Orleans, Louisiana. His mother was an enslaved woman. His British father was Wilson Sanderlin who immigrated to the United States and lived in North Carolina before settling in Tennessee. He owned large plantations in Montgomery County and Shelby County. Wilson had two families, one with his wife and another with an enslaved woman who was biracial. When he died, Wilson had an estate of about million dollars. Edward's mother fought for the rights of her children and ultimately each of her children received $30,000 as the result of a lawsuit.

Sanderlin attended Gilmore High School in Cincinnati. The school was established in 1844, during the Antebellum period. It provided secondary education for African Americans in Cincinnati, other places in Ohio, and across the country, including biracial children of Southern planters.

== Career ==
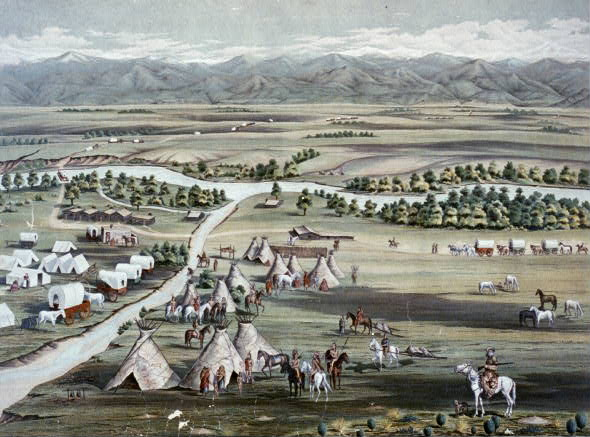
Painting of Denver in 1859

In 1849, Sanderlin headed west from Tennessee during the California Gold Rush (1848–1855), which made him wealthy. He lost his fortune, though, by speculating in the eastern part of the country. (Note: Based on his year of birth, he would have been 14 years of age. History Colorado states that he was 17 years old.) In 1850, he was a nineteen year old barber, living with the William A. Caffrey family.

He went to Colorado for the Pike's Peak Gold Rush (1858–1861), arriving in Denver on June 11, 1859. At that time, the settlement was in the Kansas Territory (1854–1861). The South Platte River separated an encampment of Cheyenne and Arapaho Native Americans from the young frontier town of Denver. Denver served Gold Rush miners by providing restaurants, saloons, gambling, and stores.

He operated a restaurant and barber shop. He paid premium prices for good food, like having oysters transported from the Missouri River or purchasing high quality dairy products locally. He invested in real estate and ranches, and was made rich due to his mining investments. By the time that Sanderlin retired he was worth $200,000 (equivalent to $7,166,667 in 2025). He lost most of his money during the Panic of 1893.

== Civil rights ==
Disparate treatment of
African Americans

There was a time when the Business Negro of Colorado was considered of quite as much importance as any other businessmen. That was in Colorado’s early day, when the pioneer spirit gave room for little inclination to make race distinctions or draw any other kind of social line… In those days, men like B. L. Ford, H. O. Wagoner and E. J. Sanderlin of Denver, put up buildings and conducted enterprises which were counted among the leading business efforts.

— National Negro Business League (Note: Disparate in that it was okay to establish businesses and make money, but prevented from voting and education for children.)

In 1861, the Colorado Territory General Assembly passed an act that taxed African American property owners to fund public schools, even though their children could not attend the schools. Lewis Henry Douglass, William Jefferson Hardin, and Sanderlin fought for equal educational opportunities. They obtained what was meant to be a "separate but equal" plan. At first, white and black children were taught in the same school, but on different floors. Black children were taught in a rented building the next year and then in two churches, until 1873 when Denver's schools were integrated. (Note: The schools were segregated again in the 1920s when the Ku Klux Klan "dominated Colorado politics".) Sanderlin also called for education for blacks to learn skilled trades.

Colorado Territory received permission to apply for statehood in 1864. African Americans lost their voting rights the following year when the territorial legislature amended its laws.

Sanderlin, William Jefferson Hardin, Henry O. Wagoner and Barney Ford lobbied to Congress, the territorial legislature, and residents to only accept statehood until all males could vote in the state. Hardin circulated a petition for voting rights, which was presented to the United States Congress. Frederick Douglass and two sons were brought in to help with the campaign. After a number of years, Colorado achieved statehood on August 1, 1876, and the constitution did not restrict voting rights.

== Personal life ==
Sanderlin married Georgiana Epps, born in Ohio about 1837. She was the daughter of Margaret, born in Kentucky, and Jesse Epps, a trader born in Virginia. They were married on January 13, 1858, in Hamilton, Ohio. They had seven children: William (d. 1917), Isabel, Cora, Harry (d. 1892), Clara, Maude (d. 1889), and Georgiana. (Note: Sanderlins buried in the same lot and block with the same mortuary were Maud (age 14, buried November 1, 1889), Harry W. Sanderlin (age 25, buried October 22, 1892), and William (age 58, buried June 28, 1917).) (Note: William and Clara survived their father. There were also four grandchildren at the time of Sanderlin's death: Gladys Sample of St. Lois; and from Tampa, Florida Neta Nogest, Leo Noget, and Edward Nogest.) His wife was one of the founders of the Zion Baptist Church.

He was a friend of Barney Ford, another successful African America investor and businessman, and among a group of four men who were born into slavery and became successful through a "momentous struggle": H. O. Wagoner; W. J. Hardin, an orator; W. H. Green, a capitalist; E. J. Sanderlin, a capitalist. Others in their orbit helped one another succeed, such as William Sanderlin, Lewis Price, Louis H. Douglass, the son of Frederick Douglass; and many more. He helped African-American people settle in Colorado, as well as helping people by a house.

He retired in 1890. His wife, who died in August 1908. He died of pneumonia at his home at 1359 Pecos Street on April 15, 1909. He lost most of his fortune during the Panic of 1873. At the end of his life, he was "comparatively a poor man," but he still had four contiguous lots in Denver worth $500 (equivalent to $17,917 in 2025). He was buried at Riverside Cemetery in Denver, Colorado on April 18, 1909.

== See also ==
- History of slavery in Colorado
- List of African American pioneers of Colorado
