= Sanderlin =

Sanderlin is a surname. Notable people with the surname include:

- Donald Sanderlin (1933–2013), Canadian sports shooter
- Edward J. Sanderlin (1835–1909), African-American businessman
- James B. Sanderlin (1929–1990), American lawyer
