= List of African American pioneers of Colorado =

Coordinates: 38.9972°N 105.5478°W

The location of the State of Colorado in the United States

This list of African American pioneers of Colorado includes a list of early settlers or notable "first" figures in Colorado's history. The list includes women inducted into the Colorado Women's Hall of Fame, like Clara Brown and Justina Ford.

Where there are existing articles, sources are found in the articles.

== Table ==
African American pioneers of Colorado
First name	Last name	Image	Birth–death	Year	Description
Charles	Autobees		(1812–1882)	1847	Trapper, trader, and founder of Autobees, Colorado
James	Beckwourth		(c. 1799–c. 1866)	1822 (c.)	American mountain man, fur trader, and explorer. He was mixed-race and born into slavery in Virginia. He worked at Bent's Fort for a period of time and was one of the co-founders of El Pueblo, now Pueblo, Colorado.
Clara	Brown		(c. 1800–1885)		Businesswoman, investor, and philanthropist; aided the settlement of former slaves during Colorado's Gold Rush
Isom	Dart		(1849–1900)		Born Ned Huddleston, he was a rodeo clown and stunt rider, rancher, and horse and cattle rustler during the late 19th century in the Wild West. He changed his name to Isom Dart when he bought a ranch and settled in Browns Park in northwestern Colorado. He was killed for cattle-rustling.
Elizabeth Piper	Ensley		(1847–1919)	1887	She moved to Colorado where she achieved prominence as a leader in the Colorado suffrage movement. She was also a journalist, activist, and a leader and founder of local women's clubs.
Barney	Ford		(1822–1902)	1860	Ran away using the Underground Railroad, he lived in several places in the United States and in Central America before he staked a claim in Colorado in 1860. He was a civil rights activist and a successful businessman. He helped freed slaves attain an education.
Justina	Ford		(1871–1952)	1902 (c.)	She was the first licensed African American female doctor in Denver, Colorado, and practiced gynecology, obstetrics, and pediatrics from her home for half a century.
Julia	Greeley		(c. 1833-48–1918)	1865 (c.)	Servant of God Julia Greeley O.F.S. was born enslaved. After she was emancipated, she came to Colorado and worked for Julia Dickerson and William Gilpin. She was domestic servant thereafter. Poor herself, she donated food and clothing, tended children, and spread the Catholic faith.
Charlotte	Green		died after 1850	1833	Enslaved cook and entertainer at Bent's Fort
Dick	Green		died by 1850	1833	Enslaved worker at Bent's Fort, fought in Siege of Pueblo de Taos, after which he and his wife were freed
John T.	Gunnell		(1836–1902)	1881 (by)	He was a state legislator in Colorado. He served in the Colorado House of Representatives in 1881, and was the first African American to serve in the Colorado Legislature.
Edwin H.	Hackley		(1859–1940)		He was the first black lawyer admitted to the Colorado Bar Association (1883); editor and publisher of The Colorado Statesman and published Hackley & Harrison's hotel and apartment guide for colored travelers, six years before The Negro Motorist Green Book
Emma Azalia	Hackley		(1867–1922)		After high school, she worked as an elementary school teacher before meeting and marrying Edwin Henry Hackley, an attorney and newspaper publisher from Denver, Colorado. She was a singer and political activist. She promoted racial pride through her support and promotion of music education for African Americans.
William Jefferson	Hardin		(c. 1831 – 1889)	1872 (by)	Born free in Kentucky, he came to Colorado in 1863; mayor of Leadville, fought for civil rights, and was the first African American elected to the Wyoming Territory Legislative Assembly
Oliver Toussaint (O. T.)	Jackson		(1862–1948)	1887	Inspired by Up from Slavery by Booker T. Washington, he formed Dearfield, Colorado, a self-sufficient agricultural settlement for black Americans. Jackson was a successful owner of several restaurant and catering businesses in Denver and Boulder.
Junius R.	Lewis		(1842–1938)		Lewis was enslaved in Mississippi and was captured as a runaway and became an orderly for E. E. Johnson during the American Civil War. After the war, he was a teacher, head of a railroad office, president of a mining company, and mine owner.
Nancy	Lancaster			1865 (before)	Obtained the money to purchase their freedom, called a "liberty fee". A pastor in Kansas provided $600 to pay for Nancy's freedom. She and her husband Samuel lived in a cabin in Denver.
Samuel	Lancaster			1865 (before)	Samuel worked in mining camps as a barber. He earned $1,200 (equivalent to $25,223 in 2020) to purchase his freedom. He and his wife Nancy lived in a cabin in Denver.
William J.	Payne		(died 1864)	1859 (by)	He arrived in Denver as an enslaved blacksmith, working for the Central Overland California and Pike's Peak Express. After he was emancipated he was tried in 1859 for the murder of fellow African American Oliver Davis; he claimed self-defense and was acquitted. In 1864, he was shot by James Beckwourth in Beckwourth's saloon. Beckwouth was acquitted.
Edward J.	Sanderlin		(1835–1909)	1859	He was born into slavery and came to Colorado in 1859, during the Pike's Peak Gold Rush (1858–1861). He became a successful businessman in Denver.
Joseph H.	Stuart		(1854–1910)	1891	From the British West Indies, he settled in Colorado and in 1891 was the second black lawyer that practiced law.
John	Taylor			1865 (after)	Born into slavery in Kentucky, he served during the Civil War and afterwards to fight Native Americans. After he was discharged, he joined a band of Utes and settled in the San Juan Valley.
Henry O.	Wagoner		(1816–1901)	1860	He was an Underground Railroad conductor before moving to Colorado. He promoted civil rights and paid legal fees for fugitive slaves.
Madam C. J.	Walker		(1867–1919)	1905	Walker was an entrepreneur, philanthropist, and political and social activist. She is recorded as the first female self-made millionaire in America in the Guinness Book of World Records
Elijah	Wentworth				Known as "Lige," he was born into slavery in Virginia, but knew nothing about his birth or family. He arrived in Missouri with his enslaver's family. He was able to join a wagon train heading west as a cook. He was stationed at Union Station where he welcomed those stepping off trains. He was a town crier and a singer.
Dr.Joseph H.P.	Westbrook		(1906–1939)	1906	Dr. Westbrook became an influential member of Denver's African American community. He was also associated with the development of Dearfield, Colorado. He was notable for infiltrating the Ku Klux Klan in Denver, and reporting on their activities during the 1920s.
Cathay	Williams		(1844–1893)	1868 (after)	She was an African-American soldier who enlisted in the United States Army under the pseudonym William Cathay. She was the first Black woman to enlist, and the only documented woman to serve in the United States Army posing as a man during the American Indian Wars.

== See also ==
- Barney L. Ford Building, National Register of Historic Places, stop on the Underground Railroad
- Cold Spring Mountain, where Isom Dart operated a ranch and was killed for rustling
- Dearfield, Colorado, one of 14 western towns to create communities for African Americans, as inspired by Booker T. Washington; now a ghost town
- The Denver Star, Black newspaper from 1888 until 1963
- Five Points, Denver, neighborhood of Denver that was inhabited by African Americans
- Fort Garland in Costilla County - From 1876 to 1879, black Buffalo Soldiers were stationed at the fort.
- History of slavery in Colorado
- Lincoln Hills was opened in 1922 by black entrepreneurs from Denver's Five Points, Denver neighborhood to provide food and lodging for traveling African Americans.
