= Joseph H. Stuart =

American politician

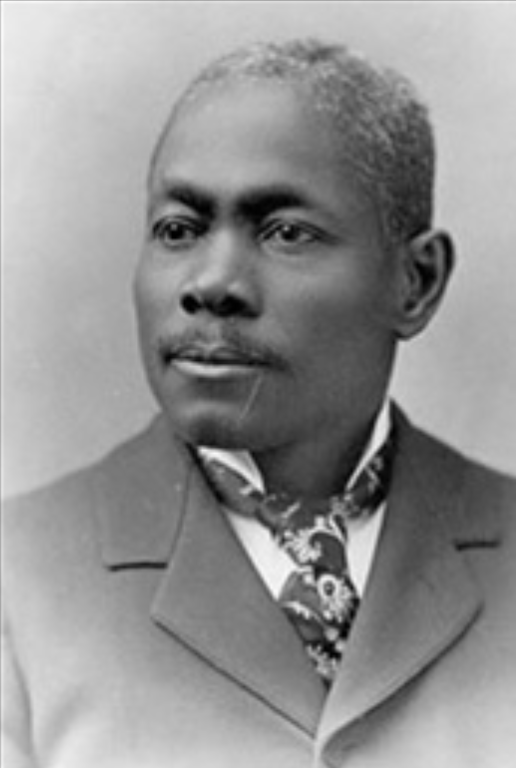
- Born: 1854; British West Indies
- Died: April 4, 1910 (aged 55–56); Denver, Colorado
- Occupations: Lawyer, legislator, teacher
- Years active: Before 1877–1910
- Known for: A Colorado state bill for equal access to public places for all

Joseph H. Stuart, also known as J. H. Stuart (1854–1910), from the British West Indies, settled in Colorado and in 1891 was the second black lawyer that practiced law. In 1895, he became the second African American legislator in the state's history, after Rep. John T. Gunnell. He worked on a bill to ensure equal access to public places, regardless of a person's race. The bill passed but was not very effective in practice due to racial discrimination and lack of resources to enforce the law. Before coming to Denver, he was an educator in South Carolina and a lawyer in Kansas.

== Early life and education ==
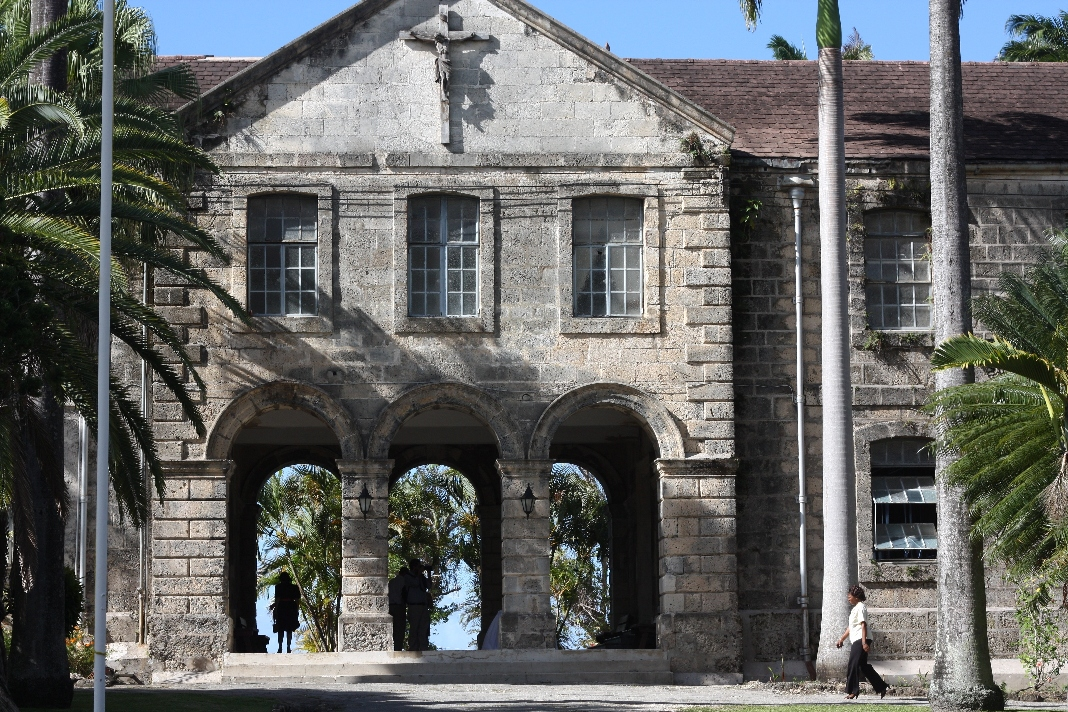
Codrington College

Joseph H. Stuart was born in 1854 in the British West Indies. He graduated from Codrington College in Barbados, after which he moved to South Carolina. He attended the Cedar Hall Academy and he became a teacher. Stuart received his law degree in 1877 from the University of South Carolina.

At the time, there were just a few decades after the Civil War when most African Americans were not taught to read or write. Most schools would not accept blacks to attend their universities and colleges and many states prevented them from being admitted to the bar. The education required to get a law degree was generally limited to two five-month courses. In some cases, legal scholars worked as an apprentice with other lawyers to learn the trade more practically. Schools of higher learning were often split politically as to whether they remained loyal to British royalty or supported the constitution after the American Revolutionary War, the spirit of which educators passed down to their students. Since the colonial days, lawyers had generally been well-connected gentry that took part in political and societal discussions. The American system of jurisprudence was intended to provide a means for people who were harmed in some way to resolve illegal conduct in the courts. It was known at the time that lawyers played an important role in society and politics, but generally attorneys were not prepared to be as effective and in the number that was needed. George Wythe, a legal instructor of John Marshall and Henry Clay, (Note: Wythe taught common law, international law, Roman law, constitutional law, and political economy.) thought that lawyers should be leaders and prevent the passage of unconstitutional laws.

== Career ==
=== Lawyer ===
He opened a law practice in Topeka, Kansas, in 1879, but he was not admitted to the Kansas Bar Association until 1883. Stuart moved to San Diego, California, in 1890, based upon feedback from the South Carolina Supreme Court, he was admitted to the bar. That made him the first African American male lawyer in San Diego County, California. It was not likely, though, that he could make enough money to support himself. There were about 329 African Americans in San Diego, but Denver had ten times that number. He moved to Denver, Colorado, around 1891 to improve his health, as many did in the 19th century. He was admitted to the Colorado Bar Association on December 1, 1891, which made him the second black man to be admitted to the bar in the state; Edwin Henry Hackley was the first. He established a law practice in the Kittredge Building in downtown Denver. He was a member and counsellor of the board of directors of the Afro-American Life and Benefit Association.

Stuart practiced law after end of his two-year term (1895–1897) as a legislator. In 1907, he travelled to Trinidad to defend Grattan Turner, a black man from Denver who was charged with the murder of Manuel Chavez at Starkville. Chavez died a few weeks before the start of the trial. Stuart had a client who was being harassed, according to the Franklin's Paper the Statesman. The Anti-Saloon League worked through the Berlew Detective Agency to target the one drug store owned by an African American out of hundreds of drug stores in the city. Charges asserted that Stuart's client, George A. Allen, had sold liquor at his drugstore on Sunday. The charges were "uncertain and conflicting" and Allen was acquitted by March 26, 1910.

=== Legislator ===
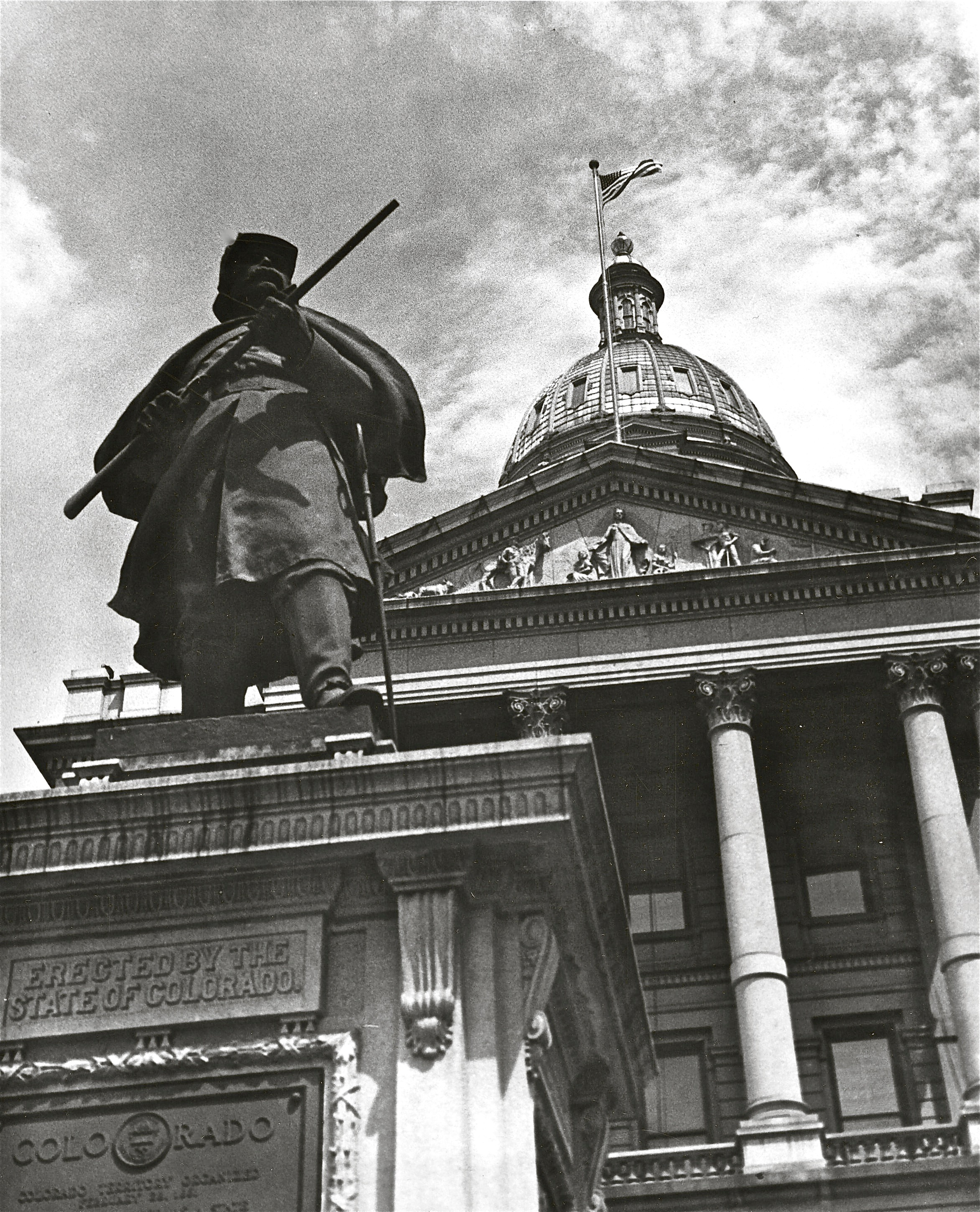
Angle view of Colorado State Capitol behind Civil War Memorial

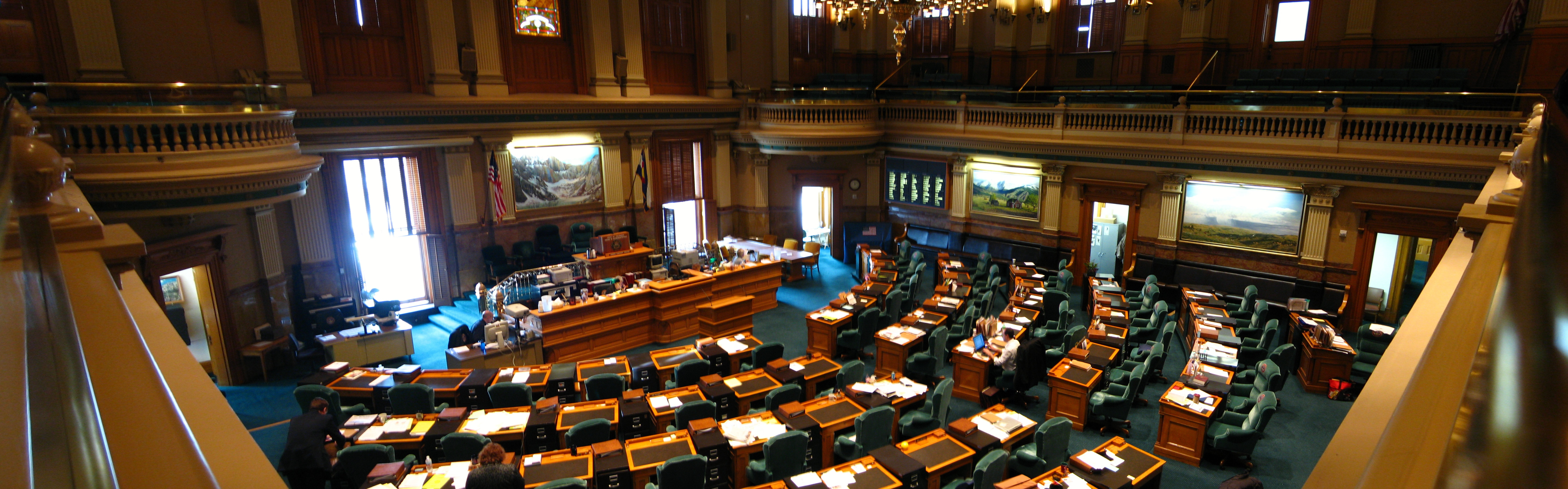
House of Representatives Chamber, Colorado State Capitol

Stuart was nominated to run for a seat in the state's legislature by the city's "politically active black community". He campaigned to represent Arapahoe County, Colorado. In 1894, he addressed Republicans, where he was said to have issued "one of the ablest speeches" of the campaign. During his speech he said "This large crowd assures me that the people of Pueblo County are awakened to the fact that Colorado must be redeemed from populist misrule. The colored man is always found on the right side during a contest." Stuart also provided a general statement that blacks want principled leadership, for which they have fought in the country's history.

The second black state legislator he served one term from 1895 to 1897. He sponsored a bill that was meant to end racial discrimination, and should have provided equal access to public places, like lodging, restaurants, entertainment, and transportation. Elitch Gardens was required to serve black patrons. Some legislators did not want to pass the measure, but they acquiesced, and the bill was signed into law in 1895. (Note: The African American community was able to make some headway towards racial equality in the Colorado Territory, such as requiring that statehood should not be passed until black people could vote. However, this bill was passed one year before Plessy v. Ferguson in 1895, a debilitating Jim Crow law that made it legal to treat people of color different than whites were treated.) In Colorado, the bill was not as effective as it could have been due to Jim Crow laws, racial discrimination, and the lack of resources to enforce the law. There was not much improvement until the civil rights movement of the 1960s. Stuart was nominated to run for office in 1906, but he did not become a representative a second time.

=== Other ===
In January 1900, Booker T. Washington stayed at the Brown Palace Hotel in Denver and gave a lecture about "the Negro question" at the Central Presbyterian Church. Afterwards, he attended a reception held in his honor at the Arapahoe Cafe. It was attended by African American businessmen, editors, committee members of the Ministerial Alliance, and members of fraternities and lodges. Stuart read a poem, written for the occasion by Paul Laurence Dunbar, entitled His Public Work. Stuart was elected secretary in 1908 of the local chapter of the National Negro Business League to support businesses of African Americans.

Stuart was naturalized as an American citizen on November 5, 1894.

== Death ==
Hon. Joseph H. Stuart... [was] a leader of the race, a wise counsellor of his profession, and a good and loyal citizen. Denver had lost a man whose career in life has been one of a beacon light and to follow his life is to live one that commands unbounded respect.

— "Hon. Joseph H. Stuart No More", The Colorado Statesman

Stuart died on April 4, 1910, at his home in Denver. A funeral was held for him by April 16 at the Shorter Community M.E. Church. He was interred at Fairmount Cemetery in Denver.

Mrs. Joseph H. Stuart, a woman of color, lived at 2421 Ogden in Denver in 1910.

== Gallery ==
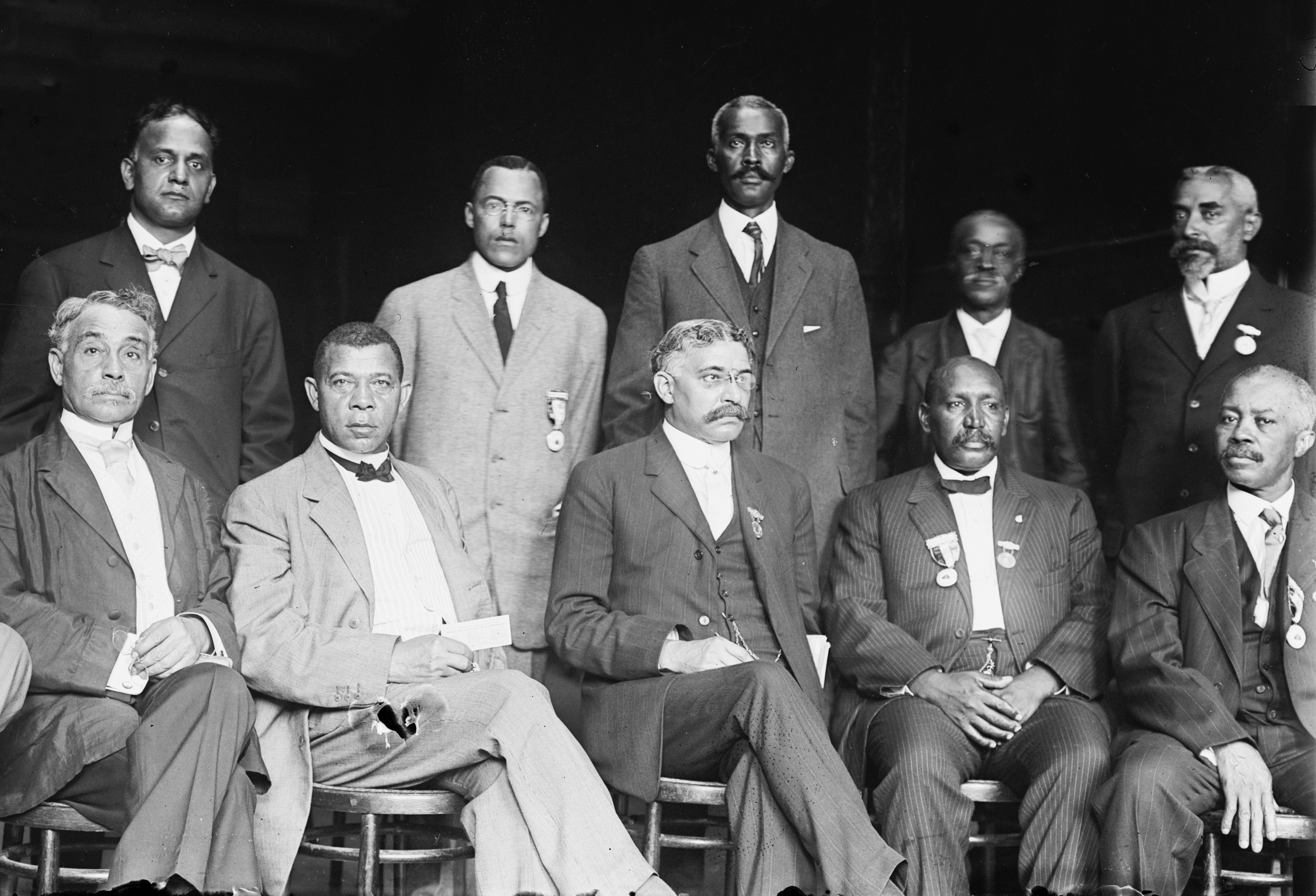
Executive Committee of the National Negro Business League, founded by Booker T. Washington (1856–1915), who is seated, second from the left.

== See also ==
- African American officeholders from the end of the Civil War until before 1900
- List of African American pioneers of Colorado
