= Charlotte and Dick Green =

Enslaved American couple

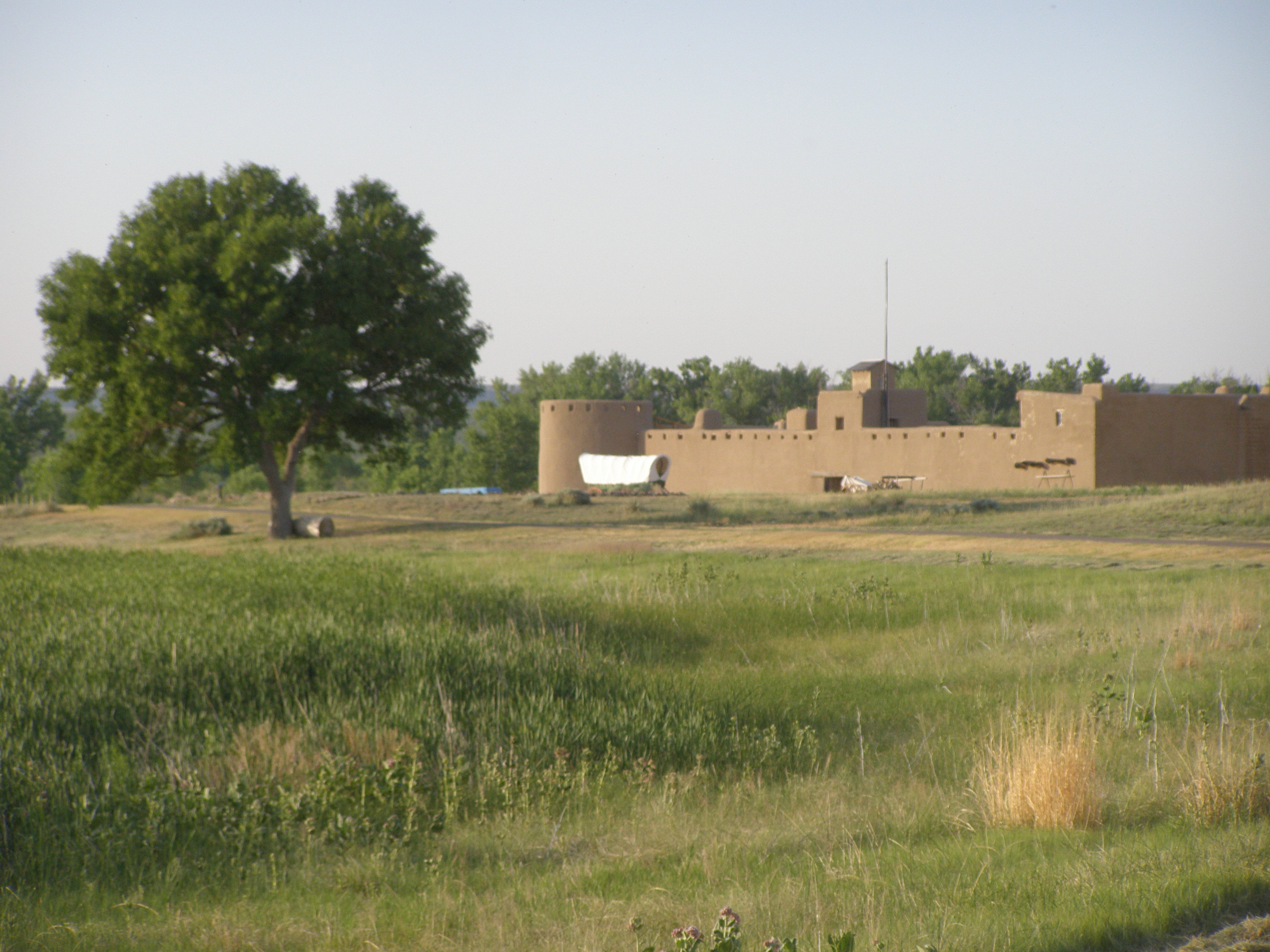
Bent's Fort, a trading post in what is now La Junta, Colorado

Charlotte and Dick Green were enslaved African Americans who worked at Bent's Fort along the Santa Fe Trail in the southwestern frontier, in what is now Colorado. The couple and Dick's brother Andrew came to the fort with Charles and William Bent in the early 1800s and became key figures in the history of the trading post. Charlotte, also called "Black Charlotte", was known for her cooking and fandango dancing. Dick Green was particularly well known for his role as a soldier, avenging the assassination of then Governor Charles Bent during the Taos Revolt. For his bravery, the Greens were freed and returned to Missouri.

== Background ==
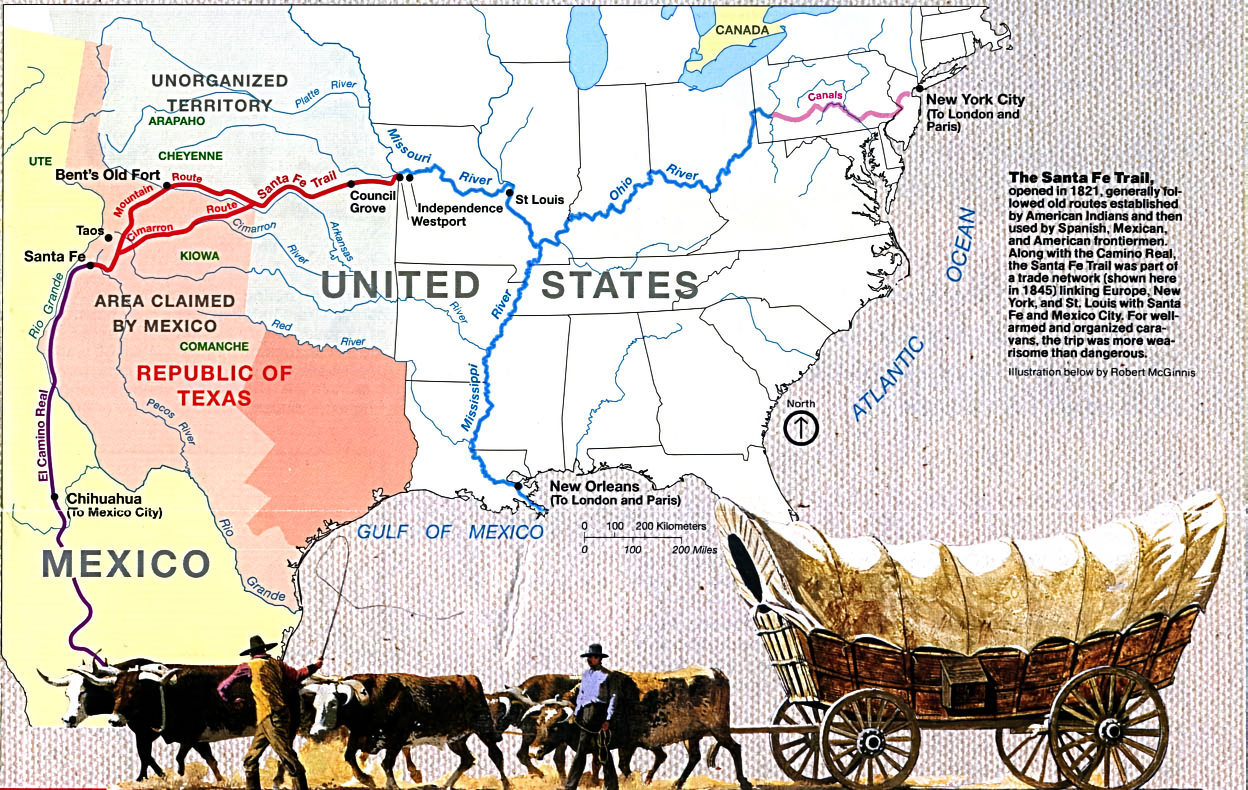
The Santa Fe Trail, opened in 1821, generally followed old routes established by Native Americans, and then used by Spanish, Mexican, and American frontier men. Along with the El Camino Real, the Santa Fe Trail was part of a trade network linking Europe, New York, and St. Louis with Mexico City for well-armed and organized caravans.

Free African Americans, or those escaping slavery, stopped at forts as they traveled into the western frontier. Some worked as laborers, cooks, laundresses, and skilled artisans at the forts. James Beckwourth, a former enslaved man and a well-respected mountain man, worked at Bent's Fort. It is likely that besides Beckwourth and the Greens, other African Americans worked at the fort as well.

Courtyard and interior structures at Bent's Old Fort

Bent's Fort, a trading post, was established in 1833 along the Santa Fe Trail, serving travelers between St. Louis and Nuevo Mexico, now New Mexico. The fort was along the banks of the Arkansas River, which was then the international border between the Republic of Mexico and the United States. Customers were explorers, travelers, traders and military troops of Spanish, European, French and African descent. Enslaved people sometimes accompanied the travelers. Native Americans met up with others, traded buffalo robes and furs for goods, and met with governmental officials at the fort. It was a place where travelers could rest, have equipment like wagons repaired, and obtain supplies and fresh livestock. There were about 20 people who operated the trading post.

Charles Bent and his wife Ignacio Jaramillo operated mercantile businesses in Santa Fe and Taos, where they had a house.

== Biography ==
=== Bent's Fort ===
The Greens—Charlotte and Dick, and Dick's brother Andrew—were bonded by William and Charles Bent and traveled with them from St. Louis, through the Kansas Territory to Bent's Fort. Dick was enslaved by Charles and his brother Andrew served William Bent. Dick and Andrew handled maintenance and chores at the fort, and the Greens and Owl Woman, William Bent's wife, may have been managers of the fort. The men may have been butlers at large affairs, and Dick was likely a blacksmith.

A large genial woman, she ruled the kitchen and its Indian helpers iron handedly. Within her own domain, no one trifled with Charlotte Green.

— Marc Simmons, Servant Couple Dick and Charlotte Green Created a Legacy at Bent's Fort

Charlotte, also called "Black Charlotte", was known throughout the southern Rocky Mountains for her food and entertainment. She prepared pies, pastries, buffalo stew, and vegetables, seasoning her food with chili peppers, citron, and herbs like sage. The fort provided meat, including venison and buffalo. Visitors also partook of a drink called the "hailstorm" made of whiskey, mint, sugar, and a "special" ingredient.

And then the airs assume by the fair ones-more particularly Charlotte, who took pattern from real life in the “States”; she acted her part to perfection. The grand center of attraction, the belle of the evening, she treated the suitors for the pleasure of the next set, with becoming ease and suavity of manner. She knew her worth, and managed accordingly; and when the favored gallant stood by her side, waiting for the rudely-scraped tune, from a screeching violin, satisfaction, joy, and triumph, over his rivals, were pictured on his radiant face.

— Journal entry of Lewis Garrard

She was also known for the dances and parties that she held. For instance, she held a party for General Stephen Kearny with a fandango, where her dancing was described as confident by Colonel Henry Inman. (Note: Inman was quoted as saying that Charlotte was always "the center of attention, the belle of the evening... She knew her worth and danced accordingly." The statement seems to be part of Garrard's journal entry.) Charlotte's food and entertainment were welcome occupations for mountain men-hunters and trappers-and military troops who spent quiet and lonely nights in the frontier. She was remembered by explorers John C. Frémont and George Ruxton.

The cook's room, off the kitchen had books and slates, which may mean that Charlotte was responsible for looking after children.

Very dark, Andrew was called Black Whiteman by some of the Native Americans. Called Turtle Shell, by the Cheyenne, he could speak some of their language and was a cook at the fort. It is possible that he was with the Bents in 1830, before the fort was established. He was ultimately freed by William Bent.

=== Santa Fe ===
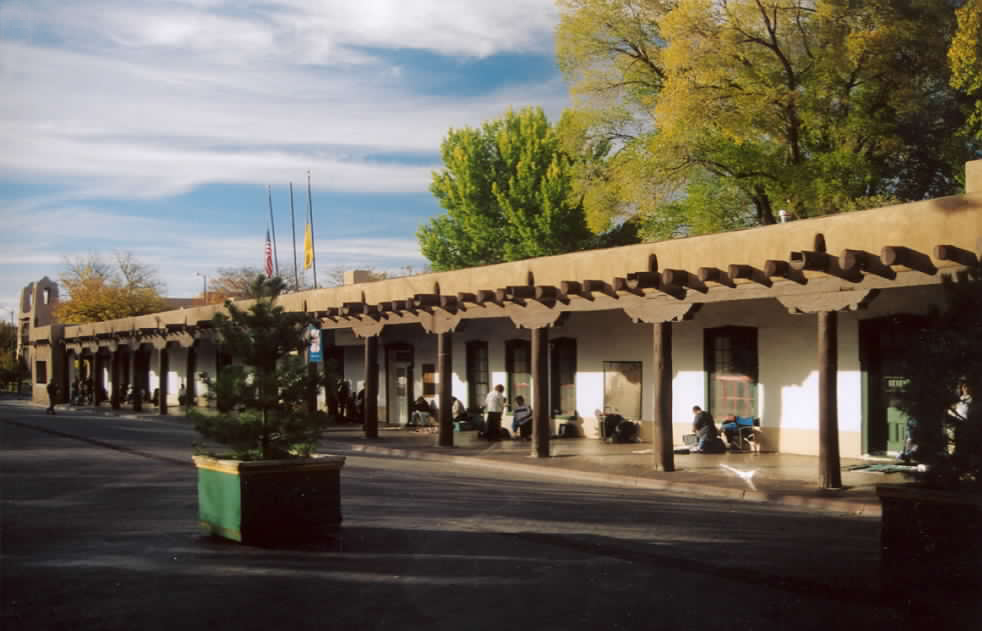
Palace of the Governors, Santa Fe Plaza

Charles Bent brought Charlotte and Dick Green with him to Santa Fe when he became governor of the New Mexico Territory. In 1846, Bent established a second residence at the Santa Fe Plaza in the Palace of the Governors (the oldest public building in the U.S.) Dick served as his man-servant.

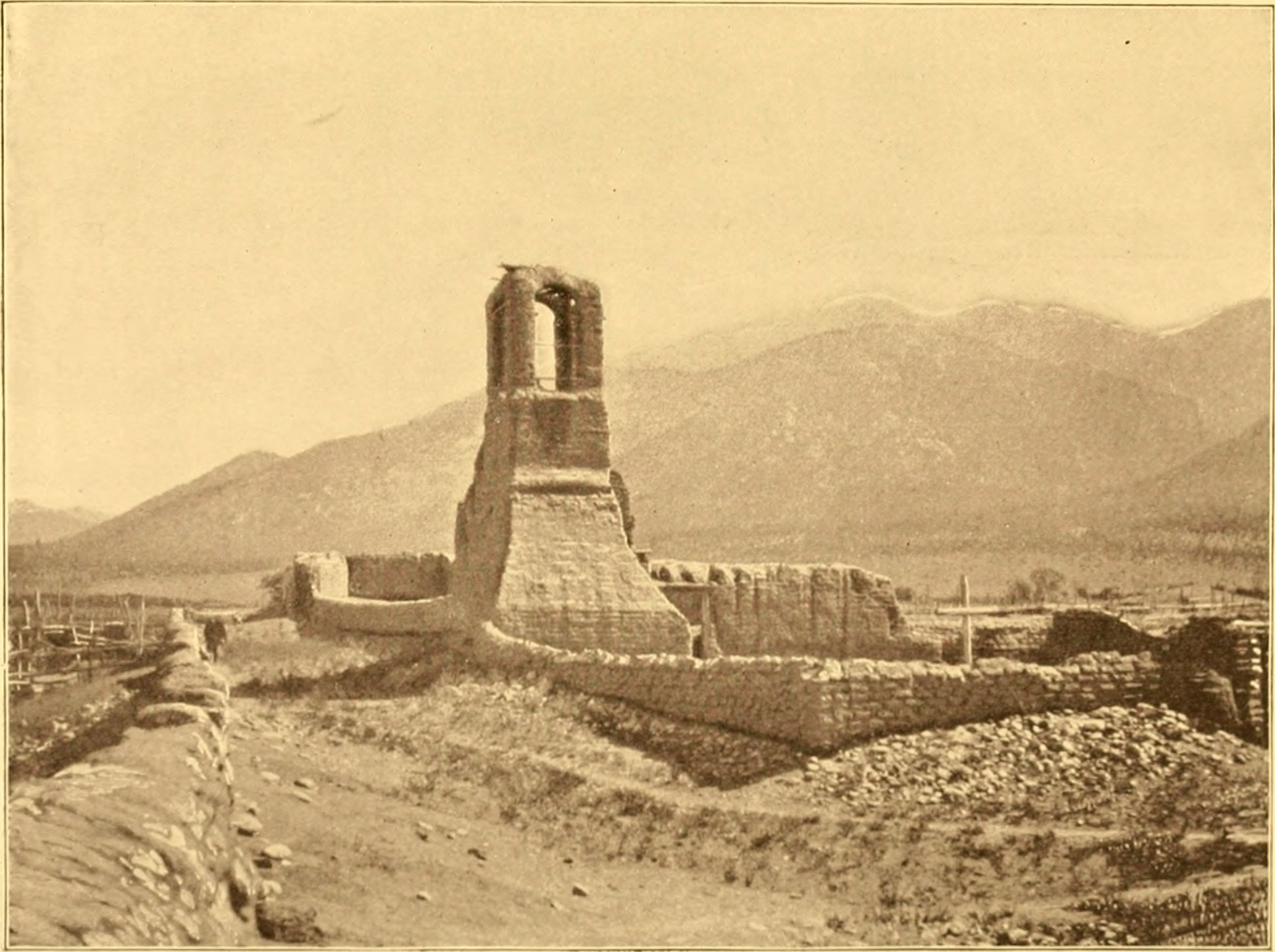
This church, during the revolt of 1847, was turned into a fortification, and held by Mexicans and Puebloans while being stormed during the Taos Revolt by the United States troops, who marched from Santa Fe to Taos when the news of the murder of Governor Charles Bent reached the Capital.

When Bent was assassinated at his house in Taos in 1847, Green volunteered to assist the troops led by Ceran St. Vrain in tracking down the culprits. St. Vrain assigned Green as a teamster on one of the quartermaster wagons and equipped him with necessary supplies and a musket. Green prevented the wagon from being overtaken and killed an enemy rider. St. Vrain's troops reported Green's bravery. He was given a horse and rode at the front with the full-fledged soldiers, leading the Santa Fe volunteers. He was an unofficial member of the group and was not on the muster rolls. At the Taos Revolt, enemies took refuge in the fortified church at the Taos Pueblo. After creating a hole to send a rudimentary grenade into the church, several men were killed and the air filled with smoke. Some of the soldiers hesitated to enter, but Green issued a yell and ran into the church shooting. Others followed him. Green was hit in the chest and lost a lot of blood after the shot was removed from his back. He was taken back to Bent's Fort. For his actions, William Bent set the Greens free in 1848.

=== Later years and death ===
The Greens left Bent Fort in a wagon train bound for Missouri in May 1848. Charlotte lived in St. Louis in 1850, and it is believed that both Andrew and Dick died in Missouri, with Dick likely succumbing to injuries he sustained in New Mexico before 1850.

== See also ==
- History of slavery in Colorado
- List of African American pioneers of Colorado
