= Julia Greeley =

Catholic social worker (1833–1918)

Servant of God Julia Greeley OFS
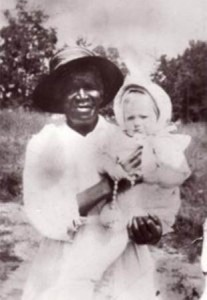
- Julia Greeley and unknown baby
- Born: c. 1833-48; Hannibal, Missouri, U.S.
- Died: 7 June 1918; Denver, Colorado, U.S.

Julia Greeley, OFS (c. 1833-48 – 7 June 1918), was an American philanthropist and Catholic convert. An enslaved woman later freed by the U.S. government, she is known as Denver's "Angel of Charity" because of her aid to countless families in poverty. Her cause for beatification was opened by Archbishop Samuel J. Aquila in 2016.

== Biography ==
=== Slavery ===
Greeley was born into slavery in Hannibal, Missouri. At the age of five, her right eye was injured by a slave master as he was whipping her mother. This disfigurement remained with Greeley the rest of her life. She became referred to as "one-eyed Julia".

In 1865, Greeley was freed during the American Civil War, though not by the Emancipation Proclamation (as Missouri was a border state and had to enact its own emancipation laws after the fact).

Greeley moved to Denver and in 1879 became a cook and nanny to Julia Pratte Dickerson of St. Louis, a widow who would later marry William Gilpin – who had been appointed by President Abraham Lincoln as the first territorial Governor of Colorado.

=== Conversion ===
Greeley was baptized into the Catholic Church on June 26, 1880, at Sacred Heart Church in Denver, and became especially devoted to the Most Sacred Heart of Jesus, the Blessed Virgin Mary, and the Holy Eucharist, receiving Holy Communion daily. Despite secretly suffering from painful arthritis, she tirelessly walked the city streets distributing literature from the Sacred Heart League to Catholics and non-Catholics alike.

In 1901, Greeley joined the Secular Franciscans and remained an active member for the rest of her life.

=== Charity ===
Greeley spent the majority of her time helping others and completing church duties. When the Gilpins died, Greeley began to do labor work for a number of wealthy white families. With this money she made, she decided to give it all away to people who needed it. She pulled a red wagon through the streets of Denver in the dark to bring food, coal, clothing, and groceries to needy families. She made her rounds after dark so as not to embarrass white families ashamed to accept charity from a poor, black woman.

One of her major acts of kindness was when she donated her own burial plot for an African American man who died. He was going to be laid into a pauper's grave, but Greeley refused to let it happen. After this, many people began to call her the "colored angel of charity" because of her kindness. Because of all her dedication to families in poverty, she was officially named "Denver's Angel of Charity".

=== Death ===
Greeley died on June 7, 1918, and lay in repose in Sacred Heart Church's Loyola Chapel – a first for a Catholic layperson in Denver that has not been repeated. She was then buried in Mount Olivet Cemetery.

== Beatification process ==
In January 2014, the Archdiocese of Denver opened an investigation for her beatification.

Greeley is one of the four people that U.S. bishops voted to allow to be investigated for beatification at their fall meeting that year. She joins four other African Americans placed into consideration in recent years, and is the second most recent. Her body was moved to Denver's Cathedral Basilica of the Immaculate Conception in 2017, making her the first person to be interred there since it opened in 1912.

As of May 2021, her inquiry was accepted and validated by the Congregation for the Causes of Saints, and a positio summarizing her life began to be written. The postulator of the cause of beatification is Waldery Hilgeman.

== See also ==
- History of slavery in Colorado
- List of African American pioneers of Colorado
