= Hiram S. Gilmore =

- Born: July 22, 1819; Pittsburgh, Pennsylvania
- Died: February 11, 1849 (aged 29)
- Occupation: Preacher

Hiram Sandford Gilmore (July 22, 1819 - February 11, 1849) was a preacher who established a school for African Americans in Cincinnati, Ohio in 1844 and served as its principal. Gurdon R. Gilmore, a prominent Cincinnati banker, was his father. Phoebe Sandford Gilmore was his mother.

Gilmore was born in Pittsburgh. He studied at Yale, Wesleyan University in Connecticut until departing his junior year, and Lane Seminary. He was part of the Wesleyan Church and then a Unitarian. He served as business manager of The Herald, a free soil paper, before his death. Maria Gilmore was his wife.

Gilmore founded the Colored High School of Cincinnati in 1844. It provided educational opportunities for African Americans in Cincinnati and produced several notable alumni. It became known as Gilmore High School and attracted African American students from across the United States.

Gilmore penned a subscription letter to fundraise for a Cincinnati farmer who harbored a fugitive slave. Gilmore was an abolitionist.

Students from the school toured with Gilmore and their teachers performing concerts to raise money.

Gilmore met with other communitarian sympathizers and was part of the Cincinnati Brotherhood. He and others purchased land to develop a utopian community but a flood in 1847 caused the collapse of a building being constructed and around 18 deaths. Devastated, Gilmore died two years later. A seance was conducted to communicate with him and receive guidance from him after his death.
