= Gilmore High School =

Location
- Harrison Street; Cincinnati, Ohio; United States

Information
- Other name: Cincinnati High School
- Type: School
- Established: 1844
- Founder: Hiram S. Gilmore

Gilmore High School, also called Cincinnati High School, was established by Rev. Hiram S. Gilmore in 1844 to provide secondary education for African-American students. Students at the school in Cincinnati, Ohio, came from across the country, including the children of white Southern planters and the African Americans they enslaved.

== Overview ==
Its goal was to provide a good and broad education for children who had little access to educational opportunities and prepare them for a college education. Some students from the school went on to attend Oberlin College where black students were allowed to attend. Students were taught classic subjects like English, Greek, and Latin. Students also learned dance and music at the school. It was considered "the first and only institution offering them the opportunity through training" by black people in Cincinnati. This was contrary to the primary approach of educating African Americans through vocational, or industrial, schools.

Located on Harrison Street, the building had a chapel, five rooms, and outdoor gymnastic equipment. Gilmore paid for the building, and other expenses such as maintenance were paid through donations, school tuition from some of the students, and revenue from music concerts conducted in the state as well as in the state of New York and Canada. Money from the concerts was also used to provide for student's books and clothing, where needed.

Gilmore was the school's principal and advanced classes were taught by his brother-in-law, Joseph Moore. There were 300 students that attended the school each year, taught by a total of five teachers.

Three schools, funded and ran by African-Americans, were established by the Colored Education Society in the 1850s. By the late 1850s, though, only 38% of black children went to school, while 72% of white children attended school. Schools like Gilmore became less popular as African-American activists lobbied for their rights to public school education. In general, educational reform was needed throughout the state to ensure proper education, equally regardless of class. Where families had money, they put their children in private schools so that their children could have an education without overcrowded classrooms, overworked and underqualified teachers, and short school terms. The disparity between public and private schools meant that the poor had little opportunity for professional achievement.

There was a need for good public school education for black children. Property owners were paying a school tax, but that money was not going towards public school education for African-Americans, and the population of children was increasing such that private schools could not meet their demands. In 1849, a bill was passed that allowed for the creation of public schools for black children.

== Hiram S. Gilmore ==
Hiram Shandford Gilmore, born on July 22, 1819, in Pittsburgh, Pennsylvania, was the son of Gordon R. and Phoebe Sandford Gilmore. Both his older brother and Hiram attended Yale College. (Note: According to authors Payne and Green, Rev. Hiram S. Gilmore was a philanthropist and clergyman from England, but Yale has detailed information about his birth in Pennsylvania and his parents' heritage.) His father immigrated to the United States from Ireland. His mother was of English heritage and her ancestors were early immigrants to Long Island, New York. He attended Lane Theological Seminary the year after he married Maria H. Moore. He was a minister for the New England Methodist Episcopal Church. He was able to use his inheritance in his missionary work, helping the poor and providing educational opportunities for black children. He later became a minister of a free Unitarian church that he established. He died February 11, 1849, of tuberculosis.

== Notable alumni ==
- Peter H. Clark, principal of Gaines High School
- John Mercer Langston, dean of Howard University Law School
- P. B. S. Pinchback, former governor of Louisiana
- Edward J. Sanderlin, businessman, investor, and civil rights activist
- James Monroe Trotter, U.S. Recorder of deeds
