= Oliver Toussaint Jackson =

American businessman (1862–1948)

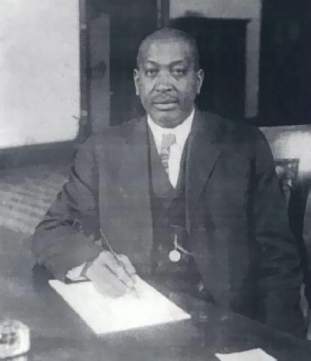
Oliver Toussaint Jackson

Oliver Toussaint "O.T." Jackson (April 6, 1862 – February 8, 1948) was an American businessman and entrepreneur, who, inspired by Booker T. Washington's autobiography Up from Slavery, formed Dearfield, Colorado, founded a self-sufficient agricultural settlement for African-Americans. Prior to this venture, Jackson was a successful owner of several restaurant and catering businesses in Denver and Boulder.

== Early life ==
Oliver Toussaint Jackson was born on April 6, 1862, in Oxford, Ohio. He was one of eight children born to Hezekiah Jackson and his wife Virginia Caroline Chavous, who were born in Virginia as free people of color before the Civil War. He was educated in Ohio and was entrepreneurial from an early age. He began his career in 1876 working at restaurants in Cleveland, Ohio and became a caterer. After hearing stories of African Americans resettling in the West, Jackson relocated to the Denver, Colorado area in 1887, where he worked as a caterer. Two years later, he married Sarah "Sadie" Cook, the sister of his brother James's wife and the paternal aunt of composer Will Marion Cook. In December 1892, he opened the Stillman Cafe and Ice Cream Parlor on 13th St. in Boulder. The cafe was described as "one of the most select dining resorts and one not usually found outside of metropolitan cities." By 1894, Jackson had made enough money to purchase a farm near Boulder; he lived in town at 2228 Pine St. In 1898, Jackson became a manager at the Chautauqua Dining Hall, where he supervised 75 employees. He later operated a popular seafood restaurant at 55th and Arapahoe that remained open until the city went dry in 1907.

== Dearfield ==
Jackson's first wife died in 1904. Subsequently, he remarried to schoolteacher Minerva J. Matlock in 1905 and returned to Denver to work as a messenger for Colorado governors. He had helped elect John Franklin Shafroth governor of Colorado in 1908 and in return Shafroth appointed him messenger for the governor's office. Jackson would serve under four other Colorado governors. Jackson read Booker T. Washington's autobiography Up from Slavery (1901), becoming enamoured with Washington's socio-political stance on black land ownership. Jackson fully embraced Washington's views and lobbied Governor Shafroth for support of his plan for an agricultural settlement for black Americans. Shafroth helped him take advantage of the Homestead Act of 1909 to apply for land for homesteading.

In 1909, Jackson purchased 320 acres (130 ha) of land in Weld County and modeled the community after Union Colony, founded in 1870. A year later, Jackson's agricultural settlement for black Americans, named Dearfield, was officially established, attracting settlers from Denver, Minneapolis, and Kansas City. Early groups struggled: some were forced to live in tents or holes in the nearby hillsides, and there were continual shortages of fuel and water; bitter winter conditions in the first year nearly killed settlers. All of the water rights to the land had been purchased so there was no water for irrigation. Early homesteaders had to carry water from a river almost a mile away. Over time, the community prospered with a variety of crops—‌corn, melons, and squash—‌which surged in price during the First World War. By the end of 1917 there were 500 residents. Minerva served as the unofficial mayor of Dearfield while Jackson continued to work in Denver and promote the community. By 1921, Dearfield was valued at $750,000 and had a population of 700. Jackson sought to capitalize on the town's success by erecting a cannery and soap factory.

Over the next 10 years a series of disasters hit the community including a crash in commodity prices, the return of soldiers from WWI who didn't want to live on farms, and a transition from wet to dry conditions. In the 1930s, the Great Depression and the Dust Bowl decimated Dearfield, forcing Jackson and settlers to sell their homes for lumber. By 1940, only 12 residents remained. Jackson stayed, seeking a young black man to reestablish the community.

== Death and legacy ==
Jackson died in the Weld County Hospital in Greeley, Colorado, on February 8, 1948, at the age of 85. Dearfield became a ghost town after the last resident left in 1973, and the site was included in the National Register of Historic Places in 1995.

== See also ==
- History of slavery in Colorado
- List of African American pioneers of Colorado
