= Barney Ford =

American businessman and civil rights activist (1822–1902)

Barney L. Ford
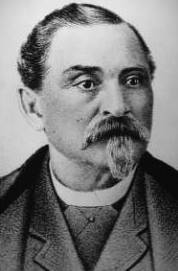
- Born: Barney L. Ford; January 22, 1822; Virginia, US
- Died: December 14, 1902 (aged 80); Denver, Colorado, US
- Resting place: Riverside Cemetery (Denver, Colorado)
- Monuments: Ford Hill; Barney Ford House Museum
- Known for: Colorado businessman and civil-rights pioneer
- Spouse: Julia A. Lyon

Barney Lancelot Ford (January 22, 1822 – December 14, 1902) was an escaped slave who became a wealthy entrepreneur and civil-rights pioneer in Colorado. Ford persevered in his quest for new businesses despite barriers due to racism, war, fire and unscrupulous partners. He was particularly interested in establishing barbershops, restaurants, and hotels. He also invested in mines. He was a civil rights pioneer, proponent of education, and a supporter of the Underground Railroad. He lobbied for the right to vote and successfully argued that Colorado should not be admitted to the Union until all males were allowed to vote. He led the formation of school programs and buildings.

As a teenager, Ford traveled across the Mississippi River and other state lines to move animals, goods, and people. He moved fairly regularly as an adult, doing business in Chicago, Breckenridge, Denver, Cheyenne, San Francisco, and enterprises in Nicaragua.

He was inducted into the Colorado Black Hall of Fame and the Colorado Business Hall of Fame. He has been remembered for his contributions to the state from its territorial days. A stained-glass portrait resides in the House Chamber of the Colorado State Capitol.

== Early and personal life ==
Barney was born in Stafford, Virginia (Stafford Courthouse) on January 22, 1822 to a white plantation owner and an enslaved woman named Phoebe. He grew up on a plantation in South Carolina, where his mother was willing to accept the risk of personal harm to have Barney learn to read and write, perhaps instruction provided by an enslaved man.

Ford has been said to have runaway when he was around 17 or 18 years of age. (Note: Ford is said to have run away from his slave holder when he was a teen, or 17 or 18 years of age. He is also said to have run away in 1848 when he was 26 years old. In that case, he was said to have been hired out to work on a Mississippi riverboat. When the boat was docked at Quincy, Illinois, he walked off the boat and traveled to Chicago.) He had a series of positions by 1848. (Note: It is not clear if he was enslaved and hired out for the work or if he had escaped slavery before he started this work.) He drove mules and hogs from Kentucky to Columbus, Georgia for four years. He next worked on a cotton boat from Columbus, Georgia to Apolachicola, Florida as a second steward; he held that position for three years. He worked on a Mississippi passenger steamer that traveled between St. Louis and Louisville and New Orleans from 1846 until 1848, when he went to Chicago. He was assisted along the way by conductors of the Underground Railroad.

Having been known only as Barney as a youth, he gave himself the full name of Barney Lancelot Ford. In addition to what he may have learned as a child, he is said to have learned to read and write himself, such as on his way to Chicago or after he arrived in Chicago. His friends included local abolitionists.

In 1849, he married Julia Lyon or Lyoni of Chicago. In 1850, a daughter named Frances was born in Chicago, followed by another daughter Sarah (Sadie) in 1858, also in Chicago, and a son, Louis in Denver in 1860. Julia died in Denver in 1899 and Barney in 1902. Julia and Barney Ford are buried at Riverside Cemetery in Denver in a plot adjoining Henry Wagoner and his wife Susan, sister of Julia.

== Career ==
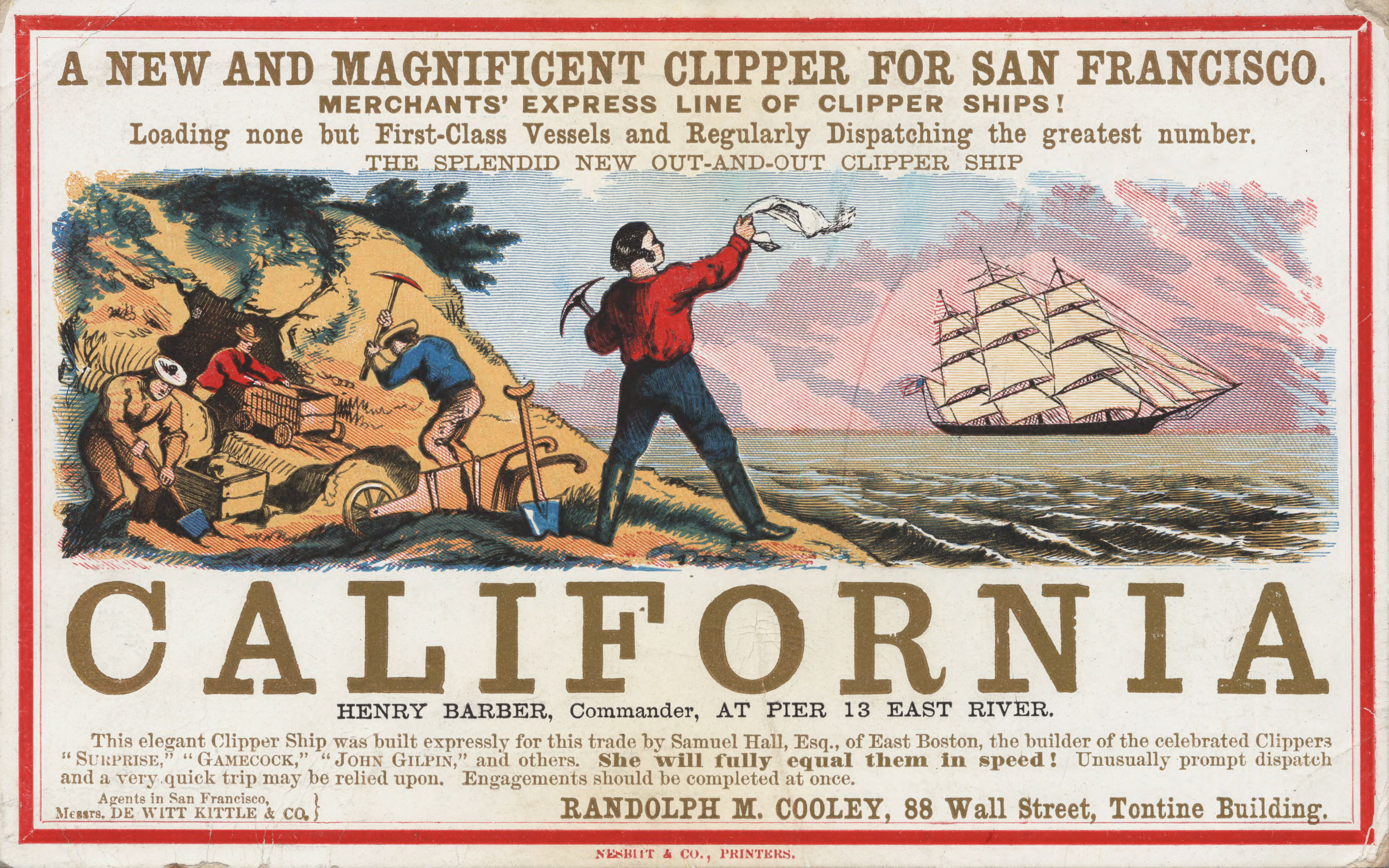
Advertisement about sailing to California, circa 1850

Ford learned how to cut and style hair and then worked as a barber in Chicago. In 1851, he decided to seek their fortune during the California Gold Rush (1848–1855). To avoid slave hunters, Ford and his wife intended to sail from New York City, around Cape Horn, and then north to California. They sailed from New York and when they reached Greytown (now San Juan de Nicaragua), they decided to stay there. They opened a hotel for Americans called the United States Hotel and Restaurant, and they established other businesses. His business was successful, until his hotel was destroyed during Nicaragua's war for independence or when an American Naval ship Prometheus bombarded the town after Americans and American ships were attacked by Nicaraguans. He had other businesses that were destroyed during storms or caught on fire.

Ford then worked on a ship owned by Cornelius "Commodore" Vanderbilt as a steward for eight months. In 1851, Vanderbilt began developing a route of isthmus transit between the Atlantic and Pacific Oceans, through Nicaragua with a steam-boat sailing up San Juan River, warping her up the Castillo Rapids, and then placed on Lake Nicaragua. It was an alternative to the projected overland Panama Railway route (before the Panama Canal was built).

Due to restoration of slavery in Nicaragua, the Fords traveled back to Chicago. Ford ran a livery stable that was also an Underground Railroad station until 1860.

Ford participated in the Pike's Peak Gold Rush (1858–1861), by staking a claim in Breckenridge, Colorado in 1860. He was threatened and chased off by local people. He found out that as an African American, he was not allowed to file a claim. He hired a lawyer to do so, but instead he swindled the Fords.

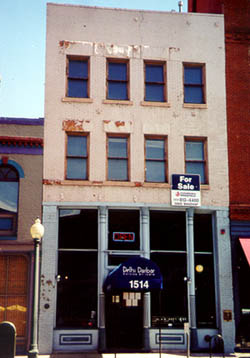
Barney L. Ford Building, 1514 Blake Street, Denver, Colorado.

He and his wife went to Denver and opened a barbershop and a restaurant on Blake Street. In 1862, he was able to buy the building for $673 (equivalent to $53,954 in 2025). (Note: During this period he briefly ran a boarding house in Summit County at French Gulch. He provided lodging to the many Gold Rush prospectors. In October 1861, a huge snowstorm closed the mines and he returned to Denver.) The Great Fire of April 1863 spread throughout the business district of the city and destroyed his barbershop. He replaced the building with a new larger building to accommodate the People's Restaurant, a bar, and a barbershop. The businesses opened on August 16, 1863, and within 90 days he was able to pay off the $9,000 loan (equivalent to $235,338 in 2025) from Kountze Brothers Bank. He became the fourteen-highest earner in the city the following year, due to his income of $4,673 (equivalent to $96,194 in 2025). Ford acquired the nickname of "Black Baron of Colorado" by 1865, making his income from fortunate investments in mines, as well as successful restaurants and a barbershop. Until 1871, he had a series of profitable business endeavors with some calamitous outcomes, such as fires and an unfortunate business partner.

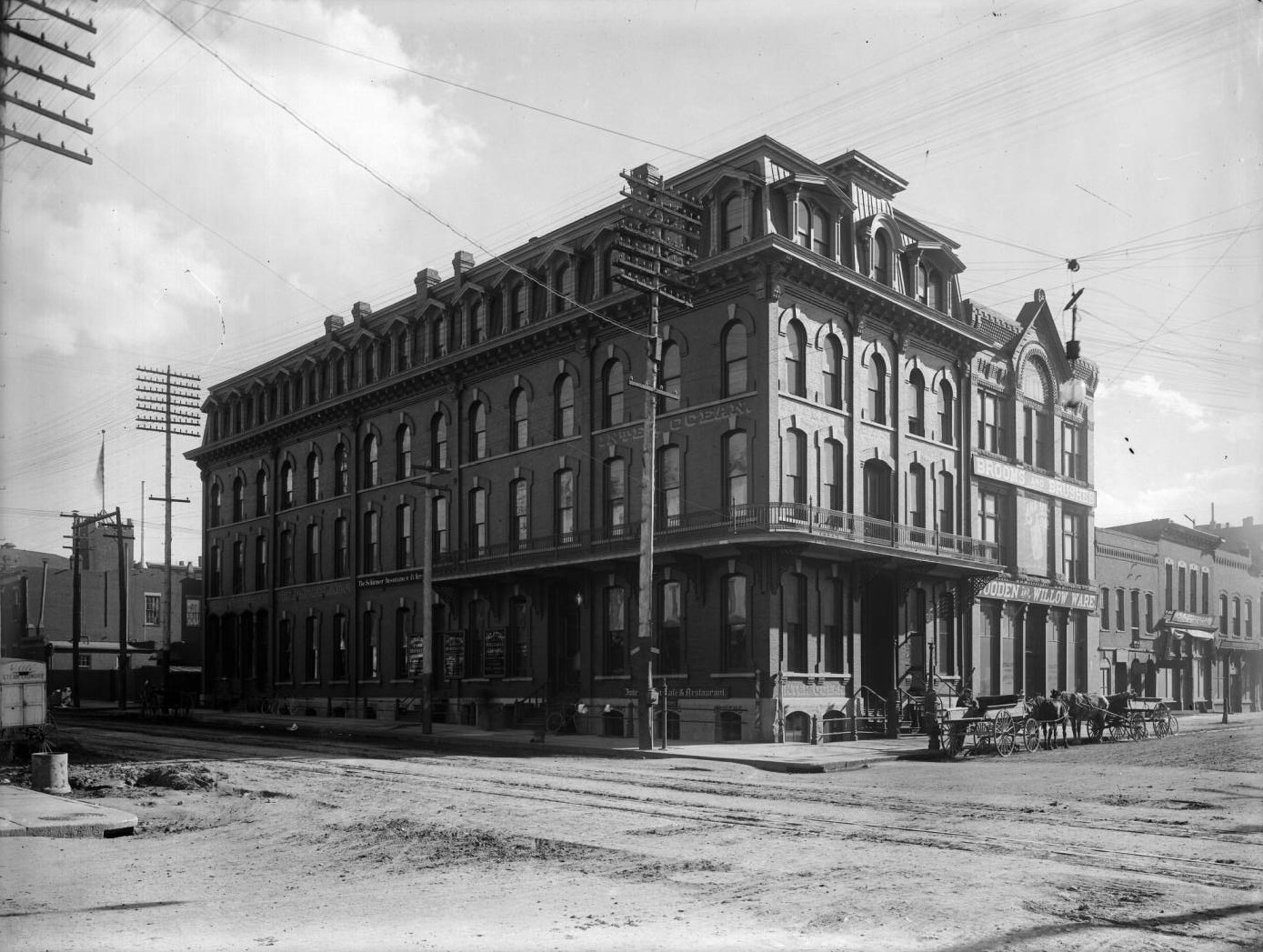
Inter-Ocean Hotel, Denver, opened in 1874

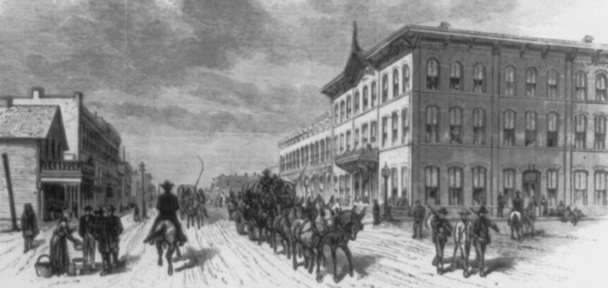
Scene in front of the Inter-Ocean Hotel, Cheyenne, 1877, Frank Leslie's Illustrated Newspaper

By the 1870s, Ford had become one of the wealthiest men in Colorado. He purchased the Sargent Hotel in downtown Denver in 1872 and renamed it Ford's Hotel.

He built two Inter-Ocean Hotels, the first one was built in Denver at Blake and 16th Street and was completed in 1874. Designed in Second Empire style, it was the city's finest hotel at the time. He leased it to Howard C. Chapin. The second Inter-Ocean Hotel was built in Cheyenne, Wyoming, after which he faced bankruptcy due to losses at that hotel and other businesses as well as ramifications of the Panic of 1873.

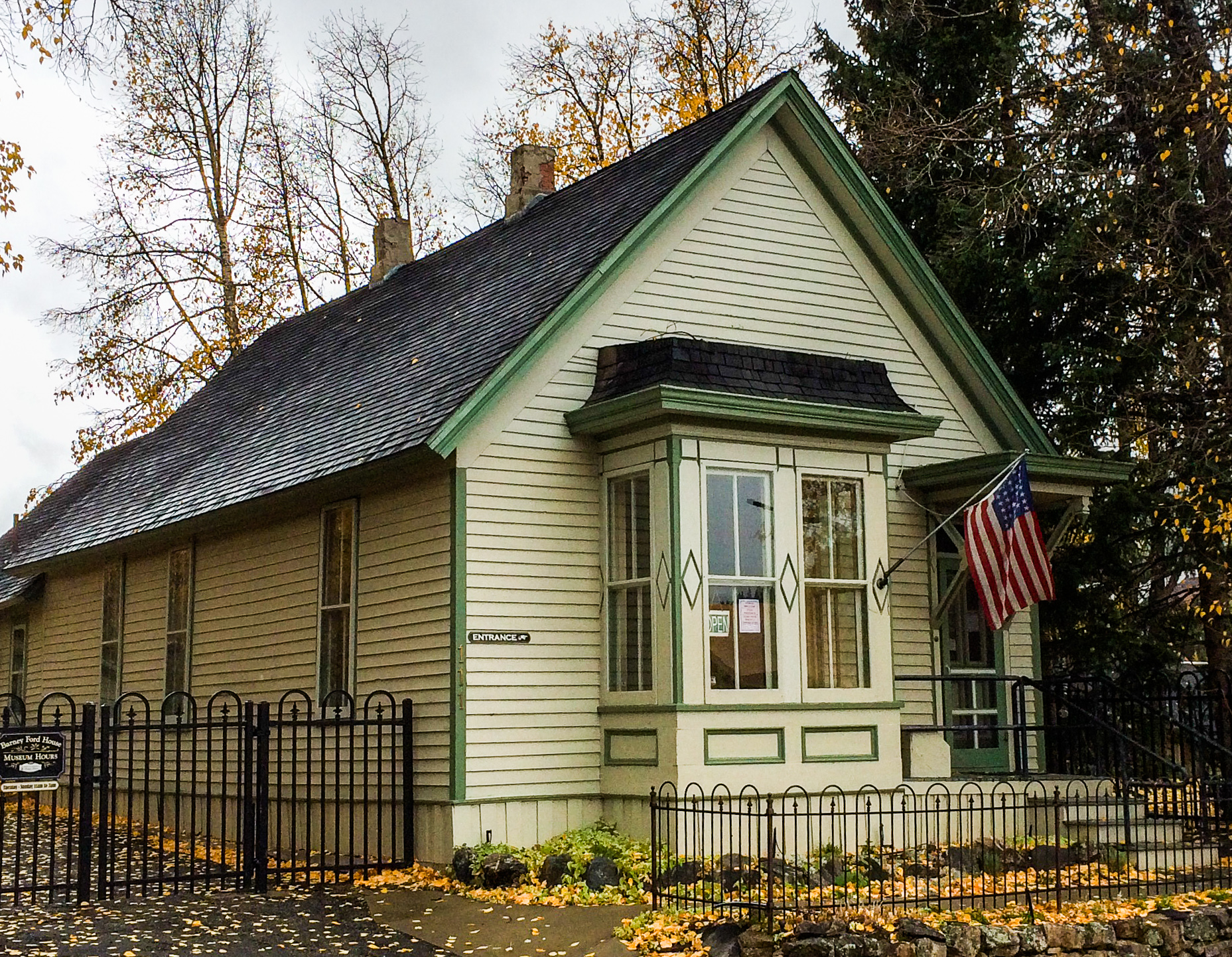
Barney Ford House Museum, built in 1882, Breckenridge, Colorado

The Fords lived in San Francisco, where he became aware of chop houses, and was inspired to move to Breckenridge, Colorado and he opened the Ford's Restaurant and Chop House in 1880. There was a silver boom in Breckenridge at the time. Ford restored his fortune due to the money earned from the restaurant as well as his investments. He built a five-room house in 1882 that ultimately became the Barney Ford House Museum. In 1890, Ford and his wife returned to Denver, where he managed his investments into "first-class income paying property".

== Civil rights, education, and politics ==
Ford was known for his commitment to see that African Americans obtained freedom in Chicago, he helped those traveling by the Underground Railroad. He operated a station in Chicago in the 1850s, with the ultimate destination of Canada where former slaves would live free.

He befriended journalist Henry O. Wagoner who worked for Frederick Douglass' newspaper (The North Star). With Wagoner, he founded a school for African American children and in 1866 established evening classes for adults. They also fought for equal educational opportunities among Colorado's residents.

When Colorado sought admission as a state in 1865, Ford went to Washington, D.C. and lobbied to hold off admitting the state until all males could vote. He also traveled to the District of Columbia again to fight for the Fifteenth Amendment to the United States Constitution, which would give African Americans the right to vote. After it was passed in 1870, he gave his support to Colorado statehood, and Colorado became a state in 1876.

He was the first African American nominated to the Colorado Territory legislature. He served one term in the Colorado General Assembly. He was the first black man in Colorado to serve on a federal grand jury in 1872.

Ford was a member of the Republican Election Commission and was "largely" responsible for getting fellow Republican Joseph H. Stuart elected. Stuart introduced a bill on January 19, 1895, to "prohibit discrimination in any hotel, restaurant, theater, or other place of public accommodation including mobile conveyances." House Bill 175 became a law on April 9.

== Legacy ==
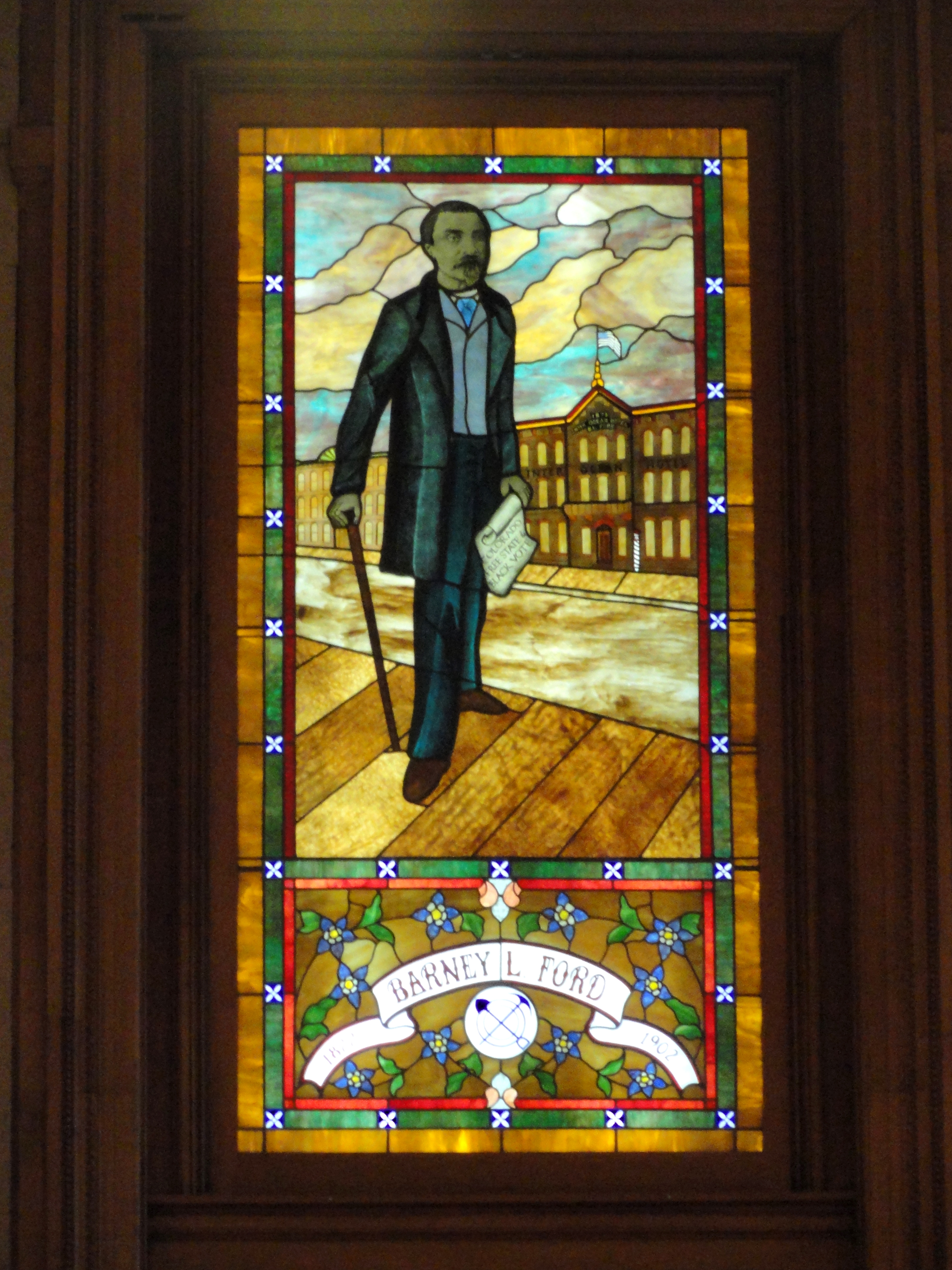
Barney Ford stained-glass window in the Colorado State Capitol building

Barney Ford's contributions to Colorado are honored by a stained-glass window in the State Capitol.

He was inducted into the Colorado Business Hall of Fame in 1992 and the Colorado Tourism Hall of Fame in 2018.

The 2021 Rocky Mountain PBS Documentary produced "Colorado Experience: Mr. Barney Ford".

Places named for him include:

- A school on Maxwell Place in Denver's Montbello neighborhood is named after him.
- A hill in Breckenridge where Ford had staked a mining claim, but was chased off of it. In 1964, it was named Barney Ford Hill.
- A residential high-rise named Barney Ford Heights.

== See also ==
- History of slavery in Colorado
- List of African American pioneers of Colorado
- List of Underground Railroad sites
