= John T. Gunnell =

African-American politician

Colorado House of Representatives
- In office 1881–?

Personal details
- Born: 1836
- Died: June 26, 1902 (aged 65–66)
- Party: Republican

John T. Gunnell (1836 – June 26, 1902) served in the Colorado House of Representatives from 1881 to 1883 during the Third General Assembly. He has the distinction of being the first African American to serve in the Colorado Legislature. He chaired the committee on federal relations, was a member of committee on elections and apportionment as well as the penitentiary committee He represented Arapahoe County, Colorado, which at that time included Denver

Representative Gunnell was not absent one day of the legislative session. Representative Gunnell sponsored House Bill 57, "A bill for an act tenants-at-will or monthly renters" which was introduced on January 15, 1881. House Bill 57 passed committee but was postponed indefinitely on February 9, 1881.

He is listed in an 1876 Arapahoe County city directory.

He died June 26, 1902.

== See also ==
- African American officeholders from the end of the Civil War until before 1900
- List of African American pioneers of Colorado
