= Barney L. Ford Building =

- U.S. National Register of Historic Places
- Colorado State Register of Historic Properties
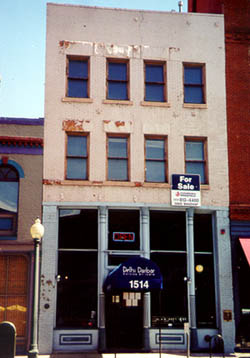
- Barney L. Ford Building, 1514 Blake Street, Denver, Colorado.

- Location within Colorado Location within the United States
- Location: Denver, Colorado
- Coordinates: 39°44′59.1″N 104°59′59.7″W
- Built: 1863
- NRHP reference No.: 76000551
- CSRHP No.: 5DV.47.66
- Added to NRHP: June 24, 1976

The Barney L. Ford Building, a privately owned building in Denver, Colorado, is listed on the National Register of Historic Places. It was deemed significant for its association with Barney Ford, an escaped slave who became a prominent businessman and a Republican Party leader in Colorado. The building is included by the National Park Service in lists of Underground Railroad-associated places, for its association with Ford; the Colorado Territory was itself far from the Underground Railroad routes north from the slavery states in the U.S. South.

== Building ==
Ford established his second building on the site in 1863, following his first building being destroyed in a fire that year. Beginning in August, he operated a hair salon and barber shop out of the basement, the "People's Restaurant" on the ground floor, and a bar on the second floor.

== Barney Ford ==
Barney Ford was a black pioneer, civil rights activist, and civic leader. He was born into slavery in 1822 in Stafford, Virginia, and eventually escaped to Chicago. He became an abolitionist after meeting Henry O. Wagoner, a member of the Underground Railroad, in Chicago. He was a businessman and a Republican Party, politician. He invested in real estate and hotels in Denver and Cheyenne, Wyoming and in 1854 he had the 14th highest income in the state of Colorado. He lobbied for voting rights for African Americans.
