= History of slavery in Colorado =

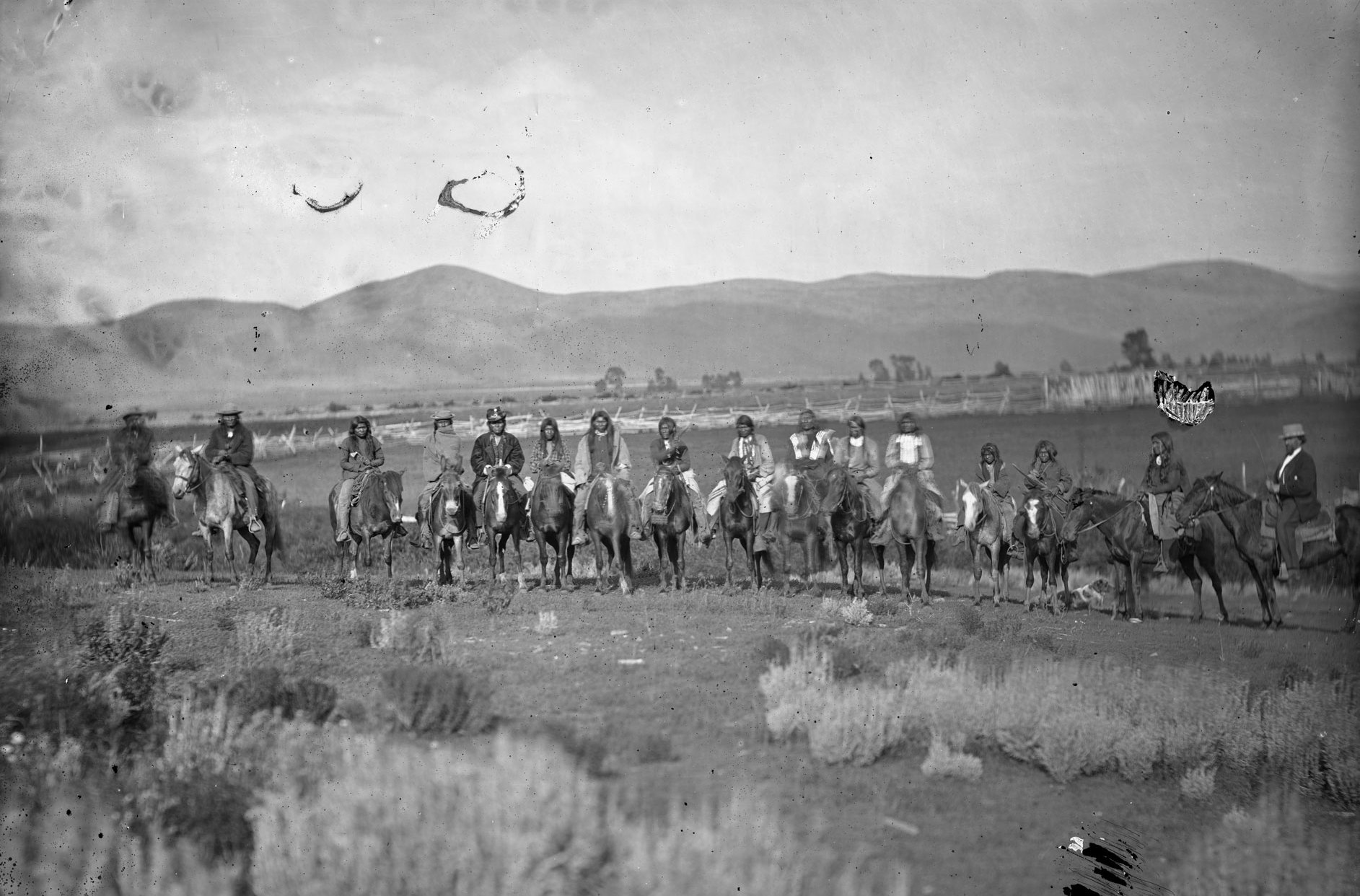
A group of Ute people. Utes and other Native Americans were enslaved by Spanish colonialists beginning in the 16th century. They were called Genízaros. After bands of Native Americans, like the Utes and Comanche, obtained horses from the Spanish, they rode horseback into villages of other indigenous people, captured children and adults, and sold them into slavery.

The history of slavery in Colorado began centuries before Colorado achieved statehood when Spanish colonists of Santa Fe de Nuevo México (1598–1848) enslaved Native Americans, called Genízaros. Southern Colorado was part of the Spanish territory until 1848. Comanche and Utes raided villages of other indigenous people and enslaved them.

African American pioneers came to the territory prior to the American Civil War, including James Beckwourth who was an explorer and mountain man beginning in 1822. Clara Brown came to the territory in search of her daughter and became a successful businesswoman, investor, and philanthropist. Barney Ford and Edward J. Sanderlin were successful businessmen, and William Jefferson Hardin was a legislator and mayor of Leadville.

There were some instances of slavery in the early 19th century, such as Charlotte and Dick Green who were brought to what is now Colorado by Charles and William Bent and worked at Bent's Fort beginning in 1833. Former enslaved men and women settled in Colorado, establishing themselves as business people, legislators, and other professions.

In 1877, the state passed a law that made slavery and servitude illegal, except for convicted individuals. In 2018, an Amendment was passed to make slavery, or forced labor, of convicted people illegal.

== Colonial Spanish America ==
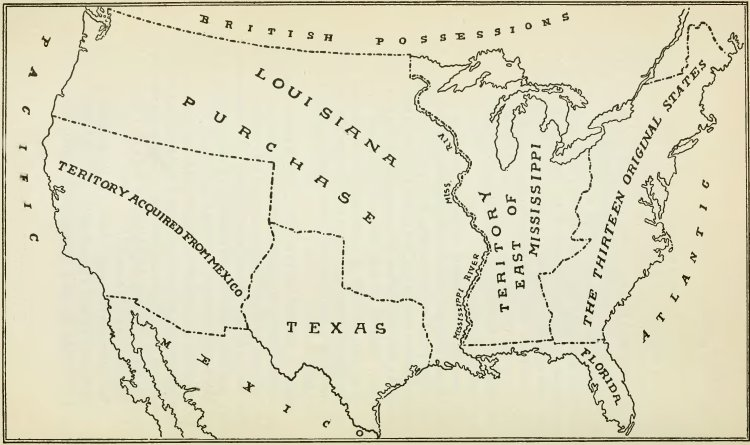
Louisiana Purchase (1803), that included part of Colorado, and Nuevo México (1598–1848), that also included part of present-day Colorado (as well as Utah, New Mexico, Arizona, and California)

Native Americans—Arapaho, Cheyenne, Utes, and other indigenous peoples—have occupied what is now Colorado for centuries.

Utes and other Native Americans were captured and enslaved by the Spanish colonists of Santa Fe de Nuevo México (1598–1848). The Spanish initiated a "flourishing" slave trade of Native Americans, called Genízaros, who were sold to Hispanics in what is now the American Southwest. In the late 1700s, historians estimate that one-third of the 29,000 people living in New Mexico territory were slaves. Even after the region was acquired by the United States, there were Native American slaves who were held in bondage. (Note: A group in Colorado, Genízaro Affiliated Nations, descendants of Genízaros celebrate their heritage with dances each year. Descendants have lobbied for the recognition that is received by other Native American tribes.)

Apache, Jumanos, and Kiowa settlements were raided by Utes and Comanche natives on horseback. Children and adults were captured and sold in villages.

== Early 19th century ==
Map prior to the founding of Colorado Territory (1861–1876). The outline for Colorado includes parts of the Nebraska Territory, Utah Territory, Kansas Territory, and New Mexico Territory. (Note: The map does not represent the extralegal and unrecognized United States territory of Jefferson Territory that existed from October 24, 1859 until the creation of the Colorado Territory on February 28, 1861.)

Before Colorado Territory was formed, previous territories were formed from the Louisiana Purchase (1803) and subsequent treaties that encompass land of the present-day state of Colorado.

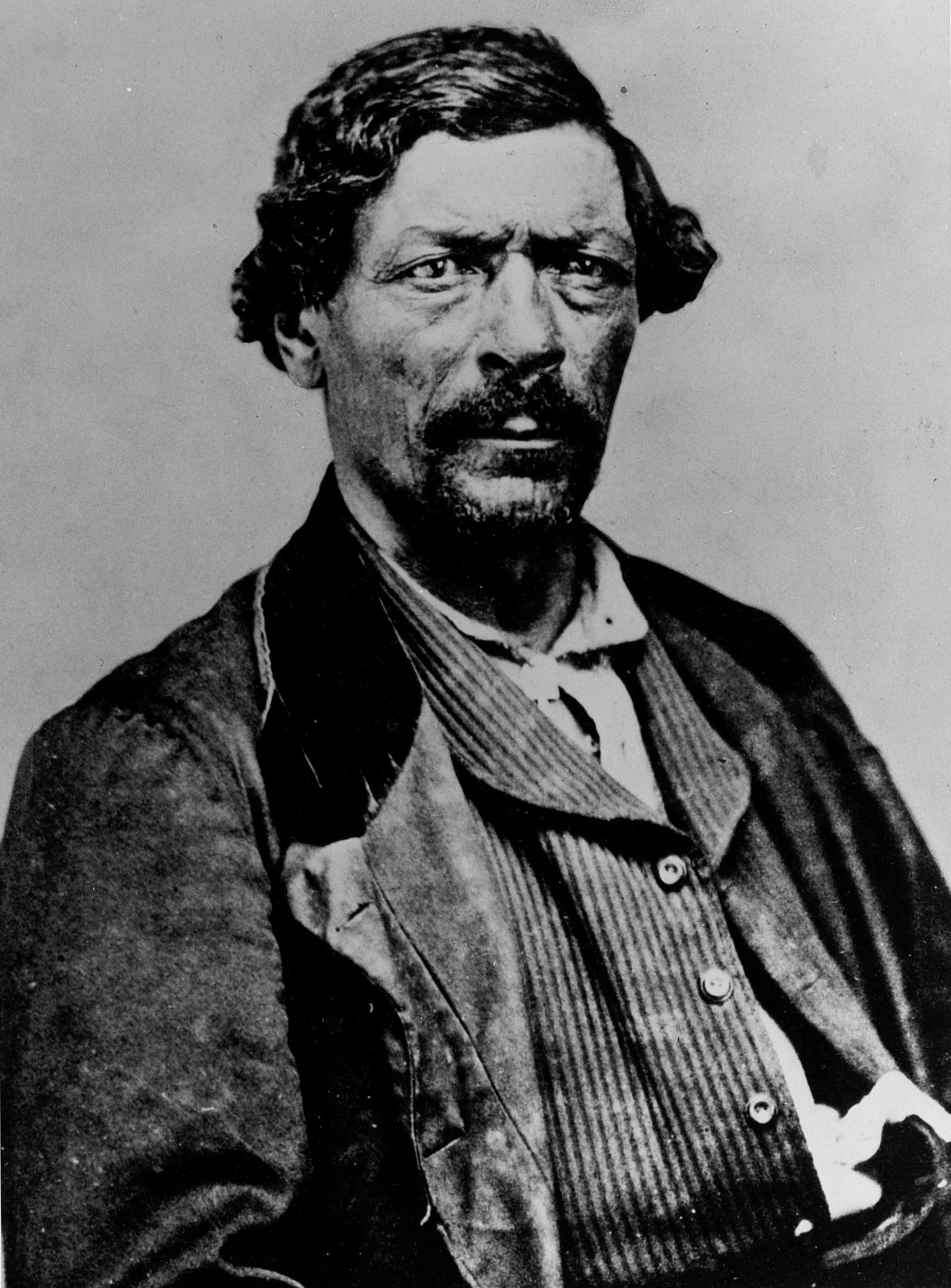
James Beckwourth, circa 1856, was a mountain man and explorer beginning in 1822.

James Beckwourth, born into slavery in 1805 in Virginia, escaped slavery. He traveled west, including to the Colorado area beginning in 1822. Beckwourth became a fur trader, mountain man and explorer in the Rocky Mountains, leading expeditions into lead mines and co-founding the town of El Pueblo.

Bent's Fort, established along the Santa Fe Trail in 1833, was visited by Native Americans, the Spanish, and the French, among others. Enslaved people sometimes accompanied the visitors. William Bent had three African American enslaved people, Charlotte and Dick Green and Andrew Green. The men handled maintenance and chores at the fort. Charlotte was the cook and provided entertainment, such as dances and parties. For instance, she held a party for General Stephen Kearny. Living as a free man and a well-respected mountain man, Beckwourth worked for Bent. The Greens were brought to the fort by William and Charles Bent from St. Louis. Charles Bent brought Dick Green with him to Santa Fe when he became governor of the New Mexico Territory. When Bent was assassinated, Green volunteered to assist the troops in tracking down the culprits. For his heroism, William Bent set the Greens free.

In 1848, the United States acquired land that would become Colorado after winning the Mexican–American War. At that time, there were few Anglo settlers in Colorado. The first permanent settlement of people of European heritage was established in the San Luis Valley in 1851.

After Utes raided El Pueblo (now known as Pueblo, Colorado) in the Massacre of 1854, young Juan Isidro Sandoval was captured by the Utes and sold as a slave. He was enslaved for eight years and then freed in exchange for a Hawken rifle and $300 (equivalent to $9,675 in 2025) in silver.

== Colorado Territory ==
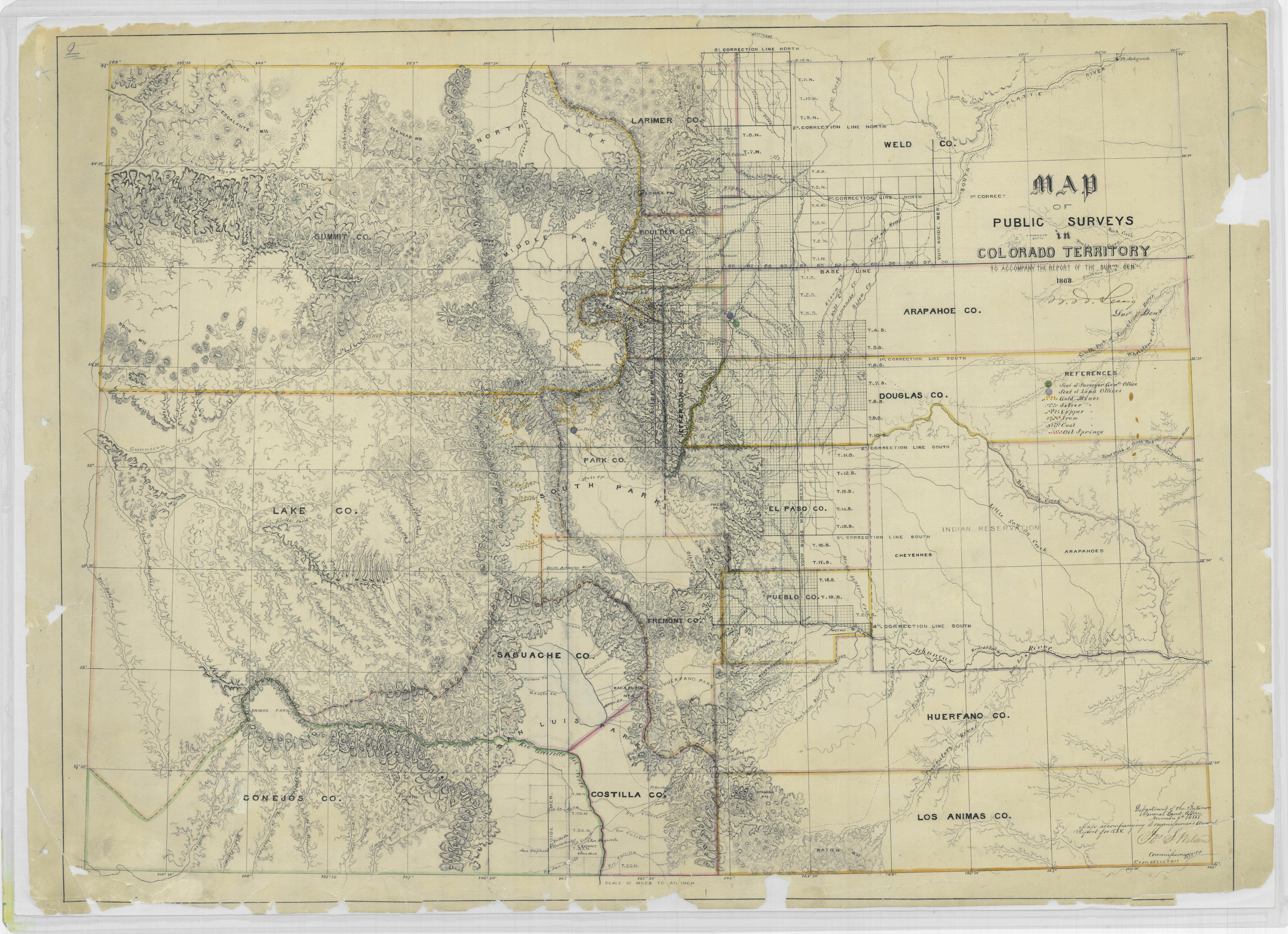
Map of Public Surveys in Colorado Territory

The Pike's Peak Gold Rush of 1858-1861 produced a huge influx of fortune seekers and settlers. In 1861, there was a clash between Democrats who were pro-slavery and anti-slavery Congressional Republicans, who were able to pass the Colorado Organic Act which President James Buchanan signed on February 28, 1861, to create the free Territory of Colorado (1861–1876).

In September 1865, the (White male) voters of the Territory defeated a referendum for universal male suffrage by a vote of 476 to 4,192, denying the vote to Indians, Negros, Asians, and women. On January 10, 1867, Congress passed the Territorial Suffrage Act which allowed African American men in the western territories to vote.

On August 1, 1876, President Ulysses S. Grant issued Proclamation 230 admitting Colorado to the Union as the 38th State.

== African American pioneers ==
In the mid-19th century Black people came to Colorado with other fortune seekers during the Pike's Peak Gold Rush and lived in and around Denver, Boulder, Cripple Creek, and Central City, Colorado. A number of Black members of the 9th and 10th United States Cavalry, the Buffalo Soldiers, settled in Colorado after they completed their military career.

=== Formerly enslaved individuals ===
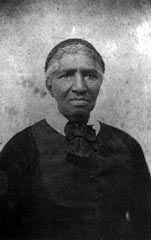
Clara Brown, former enslaved woman, businesswoman, investor and philanthropist

Clara Brown was born into slavery and had four children with her husband. The family members were separated and after she was freed, Brown headed west in search of one of her daughters. She worked as a cook for a wagon train. She was the first African American woman to permanently settle in Colorado. She was a successful businesswoman, investor, and philanthropist. After over 47 years of separation from her family, she found with her daughter Eliza, who moved to Denver to live with her. Elijah Wentworth, whose nickname was "Lige", was born into slavery without any knowledge of his family or his early life in Virginia. He was also a cook for a wagon train that was headed for Denver. Wentworth was a singer of verses and a town crier, known for his presence at Union Station.

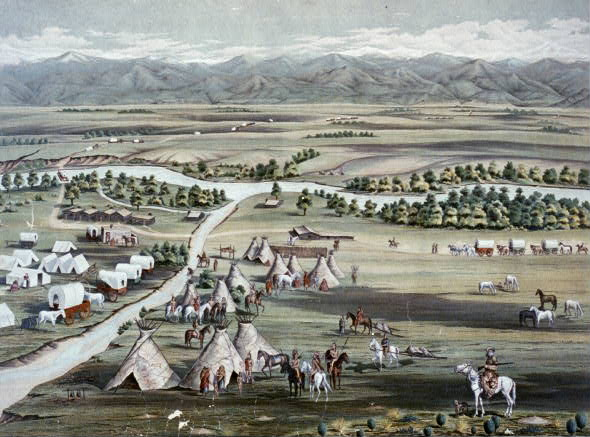
Denver at Cherry Creek and South Platte Rivers, 1859, representing an encampment of Cheyenne and Arapaho and the early settlement of European Americans. See History of Denver.

Barney Ford was an enslaved man from Virginia who ran away using the Underground Railroad, he lived in several places in the United States an in Central America before he settled in Denver. He was a civil rights activist and a successful businessman. He helped freed slaves attain an education.

Samuel and Nancy Lancaster obtained the money to purchase their freedom, called a "liberty fee". A pastor in Kansas provided $600 to pay for Nancy's freedom. Samuel earned $1,200 (equivalent to $31,378 in 2025) working as a barber in mining camps to purchase his freedom. The couple lived in a cabin in Denver. Edward J. Sanderlin was born into slavery, and became a successful businessman in Denver. John Taylor, born a slave in Kentucky, served in the army during the Civil War and afterward to fight Native Americans. After he was discharged, he joined a band of Utes and settled in the San Juan Valley.

=== Free Black people ===
Henry O. Wagoner, an Underground Railroad conductor before moving to Colorado, promoted civil rights. He paid legal fees for fugitive slaves. William Jefferson Hardin, born free in Kentucky, came to Colorado in 1863. He was the mayor of Leadville, fought for civil rights, and was the first African American elected to the Wyoming Territory Legislative Assembly.

== Civil War and emancipation ==
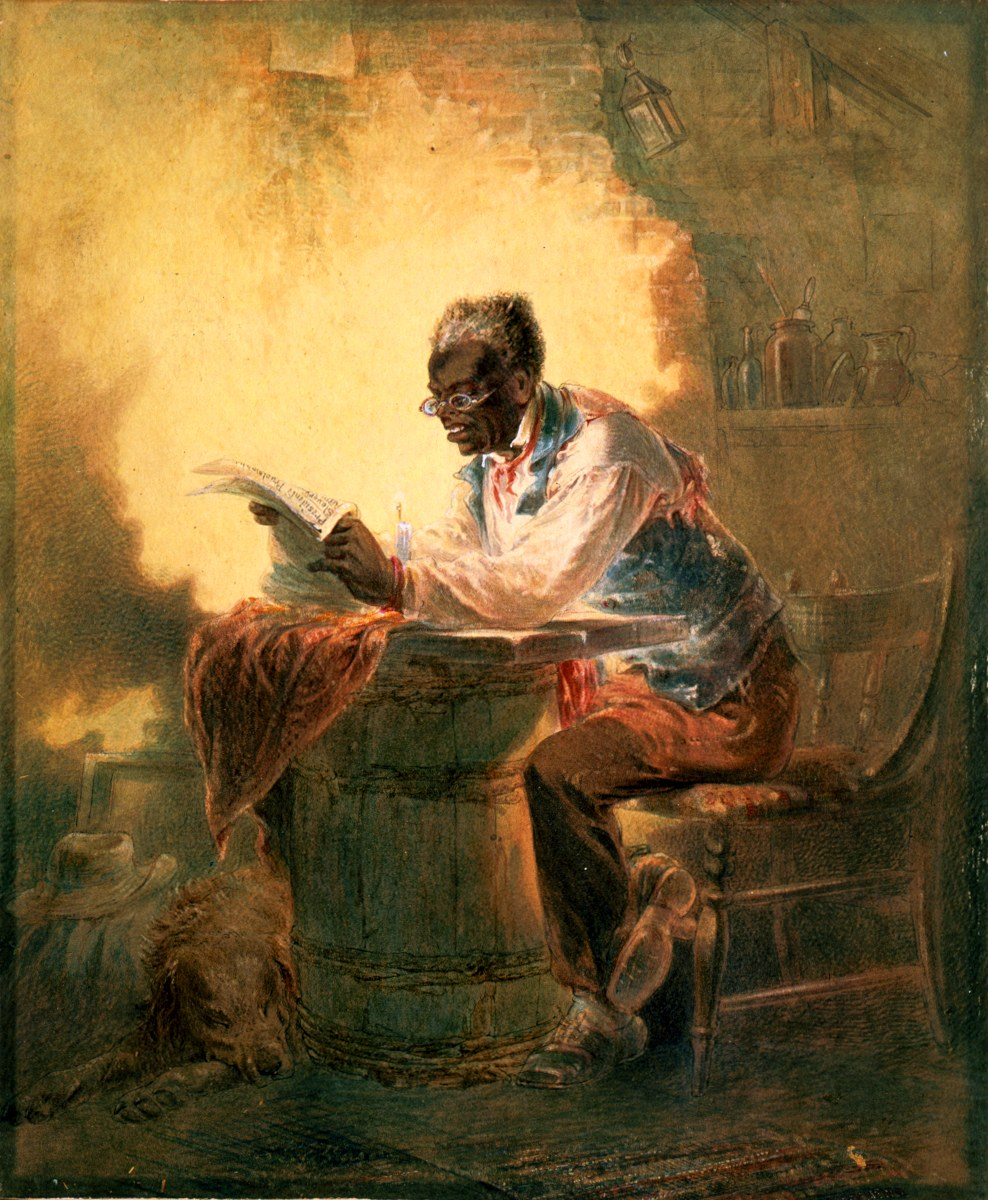
Henry Louis Stephens, a Black man reading newspaper by candlelight, with headline, "Presidential Proclamation, Slavery," which refers to the January 1863 Emancipation Proclamation, drawing and watercolor, Library of Congress, Prints & Photographs Division

The Emancipation Proclamation was enacted on January 1, 1863, during the American Civil War, but it was not until June 19, 1865, that all enslaved people throughout the country, both Northern and Southern States were emancipated. Although the end of the Civil War did not likely change the perceptions of Black people about themselves or among Southern white people, it gave free Black people the opportunity to settle outside of the South. The "Wild West" was likely not free of racial prejudice, but there did not seem to be the same fear of Black people that existed in the South. This may have been because most white people in Colorado were foreign-born and there was never a major influx of white Southerners to Colorado after the Civil War. The census of 1860 recorded 46 Black people and ten years later, there were 456 Black people. There was greater fear among whites of Asian Americans and Native Americans. In Colorado, where the number of Black people were relatively small. It was preferable to hire a Black person over an Asian, Native American, and Italian person. One historian said, "Black life in the West varied from other parts of the U.S. in that relatively large Asian and Latino and indigenous populations served as something of a lightning rod deflecting bigotry that traditionally was received in full force by African Americans."

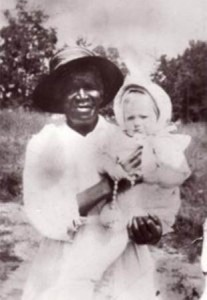
Servant of God Julia Greeley and a child, O.F.S.

Julia Greeley, born enslaved in Missouri, lost an eye and was disfigured by a whipping. She came to Colorado after she was emancipated. She worked for Julia Dickerson and William Gilpin for at least three years, until their divorce, and she was domestic servant of various types thereafter. Although she did not have much money herself, she provided food and clothing for the poor, tended to children, and spread the Catholic faith. An icon of Julia—with a child, mountains of Colorado, Sacred Heart, Franciscan coat of arms, and other relevant iconography—was commissioned by the Archdiocese.

On November 15, 1865, the Zion Baptist Church was founded. Its members, who "played sterling roles" throughout the city and beyond, included former enslaved people, activists, teachers, doctors, preachers, politicians and more.

== Legal status of slavery ==
Colorado Territory was seeking statehood during the American Civil War, one of the key issues was suffrage for African Americans. In 1867, President Andrew Johnson rejected the bill for statehood that gave Black people the right to vote. It would later achieve statehood in 1876 under President Ulysses S. Grant. In 1877, Colorado officially banned servitude and slavery, except as a punishment for convicted criminals. In 2018, Colorado Amendment A was passed which abolished slavery entirely. It made it illegal to make convicted criminals subject to forced labor. The wording for the bill is based upon the Thirteenth Amendment to the United States Constitution. The state constitution now reads, "There shall never be in this state either slavery or involuntary servitude." The law now prevents people who were former enslaved people from being arrested and forced into "involuntary servitude", also known as "convict leasing".

== Remembrance ==
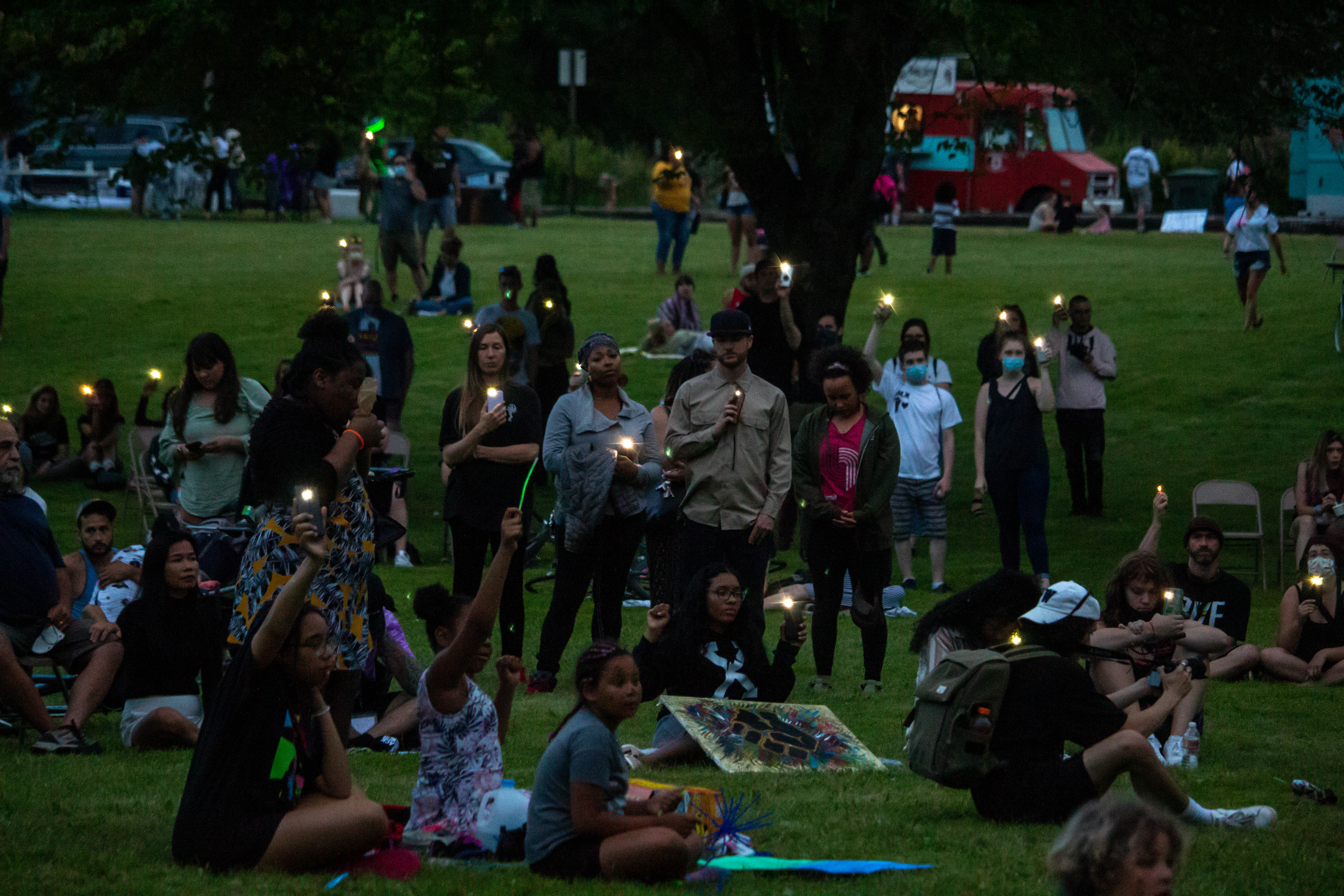
A Black unity Juneteenth celebration

Juneteenth, which was first celebrated in Denver in the 1950s, commemorates emancipation of African Americans and focuses on education and achievement. By the 1980s, it was one of the country's largest Juneteenth celebrations. In 2012, Juneteenth Music Festival LLC was organized to reinvigorate the festival which had been in decline since the early 1990s. It supports "redevelopment and elimination of financial blight in Denver, Colorado’s Historic Five Points Neighborhood."

== See also ==
- African American pioneers of Colorado
- Barney L. Ford Building, National Register of Historic Places, stop on the Underground Railroad
- Cold Spring Mountain where Isom Dart operated a ranch and was killed for rustling.
- Dearfield, Colorado, one of 14 western towns to create communities for African Americans, as inspired by Booker T. Washington, it is now a ghost town
- Five Points, Denver neighborhood of Denver that was inhabited by African Americans
- Fort Garland in Costilla County - From 1876 to 1879, Black Buffalo Soldiers were stationed at the fort
- Human trafficking in the United States
- Lincoln Hills was opened in 1922 by Black entrepreneurs from Denver's Five Points, Denver neighborhood to provide food and lodging for traveling African Americans
