= William Jefferson Hardin =

American politician (1831–1889)

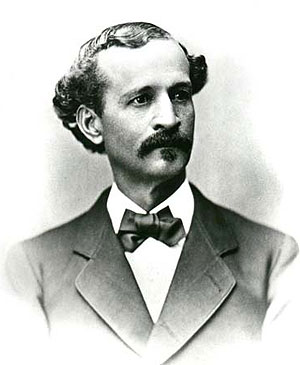

Member of the Wyoming Territorial House of Representatives
- In office November 4, 1879 – December 31, 1883

Personal details
- Born: c. 1831 Russellville, Kentucky, U.S.
- Died: September 13, 1889 (aged 58) Park City, Utah, U.S.
- Party: Republican
- Spouse(s): Caroline Catherine Butcher; Nellie Davidson
- Relatives: Benjamin Hardin (alleged)

Military service
- Allegiance: United States
- Branch/service: 3rd Louisiana Native Guard Infantry Regiment
- Years of service: 1862–1863
- Rank: Second lieutenant

William Jefferson Hardin (c. 1831 – September 13, 1889) was an American politician who was the first African American member of the Wyoming Legislature.

Hardin was born in Russellville, Kentucky, and grew up in Kentucky while being raised by Shakers. He participated in the California Gold Rush and briefly in a Union Army unit during the American Civil War before moving to the western United States. He lived in Colorado and worked at the United States Mint l. He was a delegate to the 1872 Republican National Convention. He moved to Wyoming after bigamy allegations resulted in him being fired. In Wyoming, he was elected to the Territorial House of Representative. After leaving Wyoming he lived in Utah until his suicide in 1889.

== Early life ==
William Jefferson Hardin was born around 1831 in Russellville, Kentucky to a white father and a half-black mother. He claimed to be the nephew of Benjamin Hardin, but his claims were never proven. He was raised by Shakers in Bowling Green, Kentucky, and began teaching free black people in 1849.

On June 15, 1850, he married Caroline Catherine Butcher, the daughter of a black mother and half-Native American and half-white father. From 1850 to 1855, he prospected for gold in California while his wife moved to Ontario, Canada, due to fears of being sold into slavery.

In December 1862, he became a second lieutenant in the 3rd Louisiana Native Guard Infantry Regiment, but resigned in February 1863, in protest of white commanders not wanting black people in the regiment. After leaving the army he moved to the western United States by traveling through Wisconsin, Iowa, and Nebraska before arriving in Denver, Colorado Territory.

== Career ==
=== Politics ===
In 1872, he was selected to serve as the delegate-at-large for the Colorado Territory at the Republican National Convention. In 1873, he started working for the United States Mint and later married Nellie Davidson, a white woman. However, Caroline Catherine Butcher arrived in Denver and accused Hardin of being a bigamist, moving to the western United States to avoid being drafted into the army, and of being the father of Mary Elizabeth, who was born in 1858. Hardin claimed that he was a minor and she was a slave at the time of the marriage making it illegal.

Although he was not charged with bigamy he was fired from his position at the mint. In 1873, he and Davidson moved to Cheyenne, Wyoming Territory.

=== Wyoming Territorial House of Representatives ===
In 1879, he was elected to Wyoming's Territorial House of Representatives after placing third as a fusion candidate with the Democratic and Republican nominations, thus becoming the first black member of the Wyoming Legislature. In 1880, he was reelected, although he had attempted to have his name removed from the ballot, after finishing eighth with 1,277 votes and became the only member of the House to serve in both the sixth and seventh sessions.

On November 4, 1879, he introduced Speaker H. L. Myrick and was selected to serve on the Indian and Military Affairs committee and on the two-member Joint Standing Committee on Printing.

== Later life ==
In 1882, he and Davidson moved to Ogden, Utah Territory, where he opened a barbershop with David L. Lemon. Davidson later left him to marry another man. In August 1883, he moved to Park City, Utah, where he opened another barbershop. In 1889, he found Davidson in Seattle, Washington, and attempted to convince her to return to him now that she was a widow, but he failed.

On September 13, 1889, he killed himself in Park City, Utah, by shooting himself in the heart.

== See also ==
- History of slavery in Colorado
- List of African American pioneers of Colorado
