= Henry O. Wagoner =

American abolitionist (1816–1901)

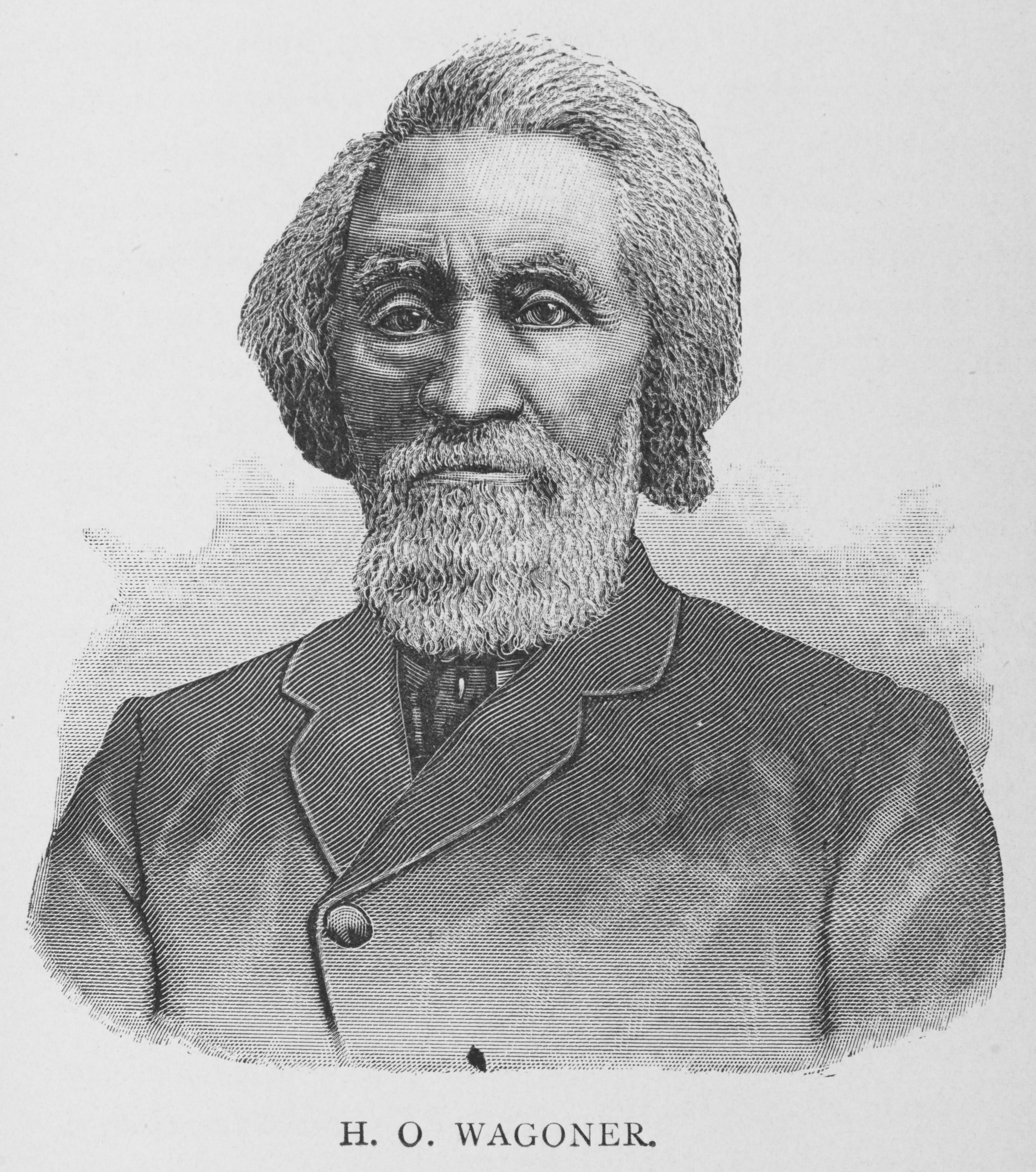
- Wagoner in 1897
- Born: February 27, 1816; Hagerstown, Maryland
- Died: January 27, 1901 (aged 84); Denver, Colorado, United States
- Occupations: Typesetter, miller, journalist, saloon keeper, grocer, sheriff
- Political party: Republican

Henry O. Wagoner (February 27, 1816 – January 27, 1901) was an abolitionist and civil rights activist in Chicago and Denver. In the 1830s, as a free black man in Maryland, he worked on a farm and worked to free slaves with a loose group of individuals that is known as the Underground Railroad. He left Maryland in 1838 under suspicion for his activities and settled in Illinois and eventually Chicago after spending a few years in Chatham, Ontario. Continuing to work with the Underground Railroad, he was also a typesetter and journalist for radical anti-slavery newspapers before the abolition of slavery in Chicago. Around this time he befriended Frederick Douglass, with whom he would remain close throughout his life. During the American Civil War (1861–1865), he helped recruit black soldiers for Illinois and Massachusetts regiments. After the war, he moved to Denver, where he had spent some time previously. He continued to be a leader in Denver, working to secure blacks the right to vote and equality in education and under the law.

== Early life ==
Henry O. Wagoner was born in Hagerstown, Maryland on February 27, 1816. As a child, Wagoner was taught to read by his paternal grandmother, but was rarely able to attend school, achieving less than a year's schooling while working on a farm. Starting about 1835, Wagoner became active trying to free slaves, and he remained a part of the Underground Railroad and various anti-slavery movements until the abolition of slavery in 1865. In 1838 he moved to Baltimore, where he assisted the local Underground Railroad until he was suspected for his actions and had to leave town. On September 8, 1838, Wagoner left for the west. In mid-September he arrived in Wheeling, West Virginia, where he stayed six weeks before moving on to Cincinnati and Dayton, Ohio, where as a literate black man, he taught school until the spring. Moving on, he arrived in New Orleans on April 11, 1839, and then traveled through St. Louis, Missouri, finally settling in Galena, Illinois. There, he learned to set type and took work at the Northwestern Gazette and Galena Advertiser. In Galena, he befriended Elihu B. Washburne, with whom he did some business and maintained a friendship long after.

== Move to Chicago ==
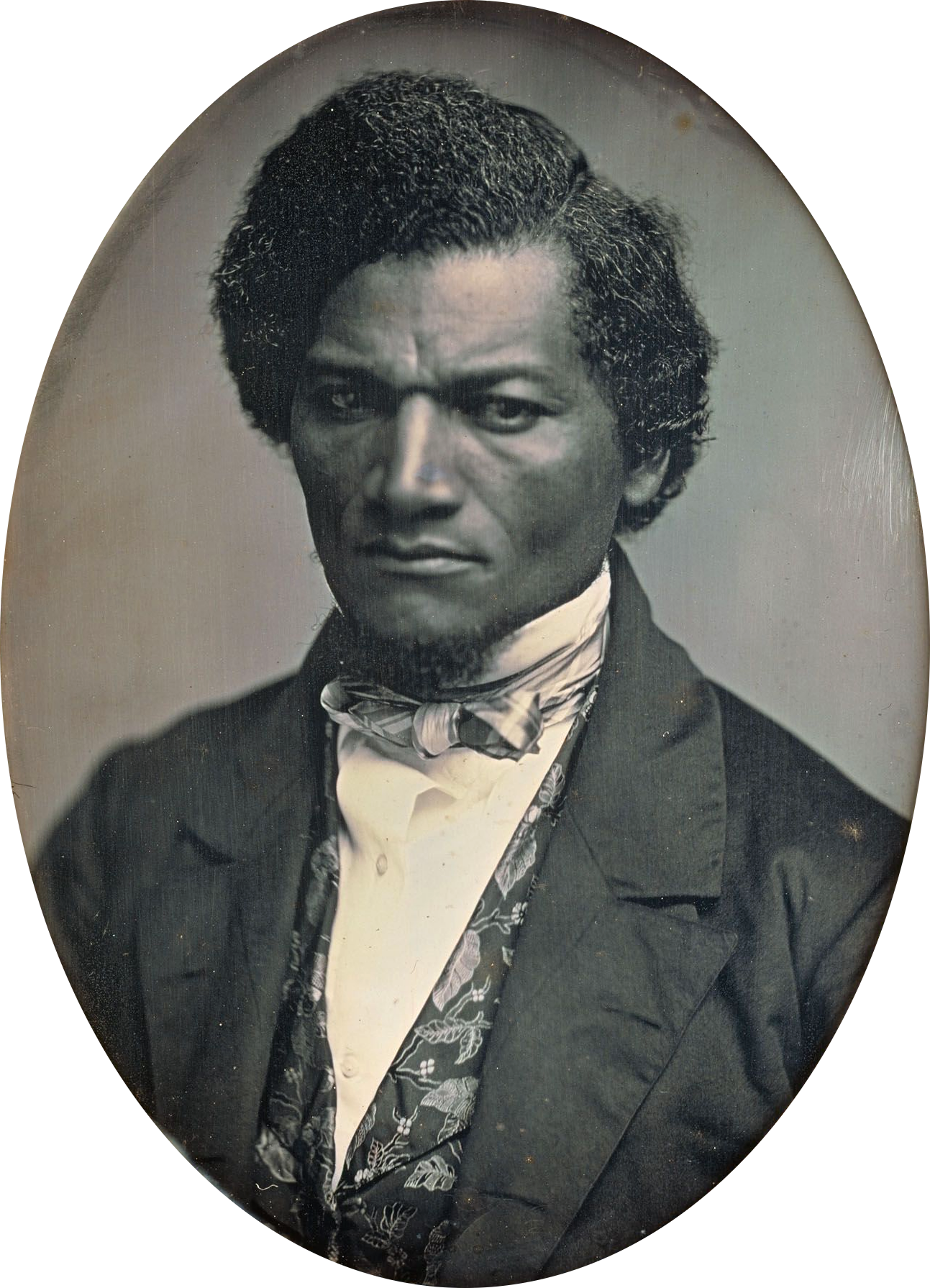
Frederick Douglass in c. 1847–1852

In late 1843 he moved to Chatham, Ontario, a popular Underground Railroad terminus, where he worked at Chatham Journal. He also taught primary school in Kent County, Ontario. On August 7, 1844, he married a woman named Susan. In May 1846 he moved to a house on Dearborn Street in Chicago, taking typesetting work in the printing office at the Western Citizen and the Chicago Advertiser. When Frederick Douglass started publishing the North Star in 1846, Wagoner became an occasional correspondent. In late 1847, he quit working in printing and began to acquire property. By 1852, he owned and operated a produce depot and grist mill, specializing in southern-style corn meal with great success.

=== Abolition and civil rights activities in Chicago ===
Wagoner became a leader in Chicago civil rights activism. He was active in local, state, and national Colored Conventions Movement and civil rights activities. In the late 1840s, Frederick Douglass was touring the continent speaking out against slavery, and sometime during or shortly after 1848, Wagoner and Douglass finally met in person and became friends. Wagoner founded a Literary and Debating Society at the Quinn African Methodist Episcopal Church in Chicago in 1852, and together with leading Chicago abolitionist John Jones represented Chicago at the 1853 Rochester, New York National African American Convention. His was one of 5 names attached to the address of the convention to the people of the United States published under the title, The Claims of Our Common Cause, along with Douglass, James Monroe Whitfield, Amos Noë Freeman, and George Boyer Vashon.

Wagoner, Jones, and fellow Chicago abolitionists H. Ford Douglas, James D. Bonner, and Charles V. Dyer were leaders in anti-slavery movement in Chicago, overtly through public writings and covertly through Underground Railroad activities. The group was especially outspoken in opposition to the 1854 Kansas-Nebraska Act which nullified the Missouri Compromise of 1820 and expanded slavery. In 1856 he attended the National Convention of Radical Abolitionists, and that same year he campaigned in Illinois for presidential candidate Gerrit Smith.

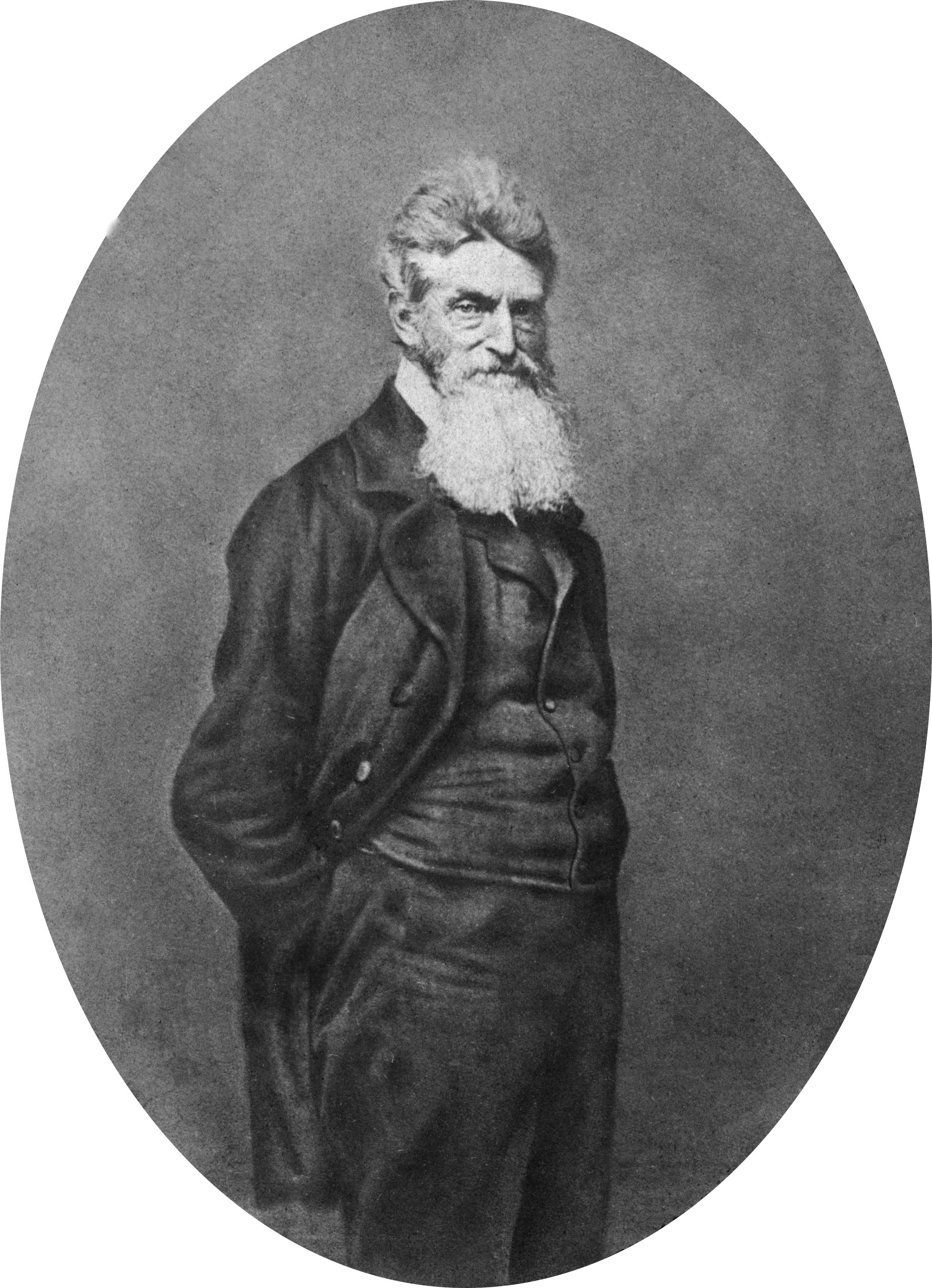
John Brown in 1859

In 1857 he met John Brown, and afterwards, along with John Jones, he was an agent for Brown and aiding fugitive slaves escaping through Chicago to Canada. In 1859, he attended the secret meetings held by Brown and Douglass in Chatham, Ontario. Wagoner wished to become a part of Brown's mission, but his property was damaged in a fire, and he felt his duty was to rebuild and support his family first. Jones, Wagoner, and Allan Pinkerton helped purchase clothes and supplies for Brown at a meeting in Chicago. Jones' wife, Mary, guessed that the supplies included the suit Brown was hung in after the failure of John Brown's raid on Harpers Ferry in November 1859. Wagoner felt strongly that America was his home and he should work for its improvement. He reacted angrily when the Chicago Tribune falsely reported in 1859 that he and other families intended to emigrate soon to Haiti and did not generally favor emigration. He was in correspondence with Benjamin Coates and wrote to him in opposition to his work with the American Colonization Society in 1859, although Wagoner soon after wrote in favor of emigration in the Douglass' Monthly.

Other Chicagoans with whom Wagoner was associated in his civil rights activities included James D. Bonner, Byrd Parker, Reuben H. Rollins, and William Johnson. Influences in Wagoner's writings included Thomas Skidmoore and William Goodell.

== Civil War ==
He left Chicago in 1860 and arrived in Denver, Colorado, August 1, 1860, seeking to make a fortune in the gold mines near Pikes Peak. He moved with his brother-in-law Barney L. Ford, and the area they settled was named "Ford Hill" in 1964 (before that time it was referred to by a racial slur). In the fall of 1861 the American Civil War (1861–1865) was underway and he returned to Chicago and took work as an assistant to a sutler for the Union Army. He secured a commission to recruit for the 29th Regiment, United States Colored Infantry. He then secured another to recruit for the 5th Regiment Massachusetts Colored Volunteer Cavalry. Among those he recruited were some he had met while assisting them to freedom on the Underground Railroad. He then was commissioned to recruit refugees in contraband camps in Mississippi to serve for additional black regiments for the state of Illinois. Wagoner and his son also helped organize anti-Black Law protest meetings in Chicago in 1864.

== Denver ==
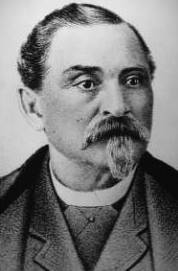
Wagoner's friend and brother-in-law, Barney Ford

After the war he returned to Denver, living in the Five Points neighborhood. Wagoner became active in Republican politics and campaigned for black voting rights.

In 1866, Wagoner hosted Frederick Douglass, Jr. and Lewis Henry Douglass, two of Frederick Douglass' sons, in Denver, and taught them typography. About this same time, along with William J. Hardin, Lewis taught reading, writing, and other subjects to adult blacks in Wagoner's home until the Denver school board approved a segregated school building in 1867 and integrated public schools in 1873. Wagoner also operated a saloon and restaurant and in 1870 was estimated to be the wealthiest black in the city according to the U.S. Census taken that year. The elder Douglass would repay the favor in 1874 when he helped secure Wagoner's son, Henry O. Wagoner, Jr. a position as consular clerk in Paris. When Henry later died in Lyon, France, Douglass helped find a grave for Henry while touring Europe in 1886.

In 1876, Wagoner was appointed a clerk in the first Colorado State Legislature, and in 1880 he was appointed deputy sheriff of Arapahoe County, Colorado, where he worked as bailiff of the District Court. He served as sheriff for three years and also served as a ward election judge in Denver.

In 1882, Wagoner briefly edited the Denver Star, which had recently been founded by Lewis Price. As editor, Wagoner argued for civil rights, speaking out against Supreme Court decisions in the Civil Rights Cases in 1883 and in Plessy v. Ferguson in 1896. He was a commissioner at the 1884 World Cotton Centennial in New Orleans.

== Personal life and death ==
Wagoner's wife, Susan, died in 1870. They had eight children, seven daughters and a son. Only two daughters outlived him. Wagoner died January 27, 1901, at his home in Denver.

== See also ==
- History of slavery in Colorado
- List of African American pioneers of Colorado
