= List of people from Denver =

Coordinates: 39.7392°N 104.9850°W

Location of the City and County of Denver in Colorado

This is a list of some notable people who have lived in the City and County of Denver, Colorado, United States.

People born elsewhere but raised in Denver are marked with a §. People born and raised elsewhere who have lived in Denver as adults are marked with a #.

== Academia ==
- Harold Agnew (1921–2013), physicist
- Hal Anger (1920–2005), electrical engineer, biophysicist
- Lena Lovato Archuleta (1920–2011), administrator, librarian #
- John Arthur (1946–2007), philosopher
- Alfred Marshall Bailey (1894–1978), ornithologist #
- Jacques Bailly (1966– ), classics scholar, Scripps National Spelling Bee pronouncer
- Thomas Bopp (1949–2018), astronomer and co-discoverer of comet Hale-Bopp
- Jason Box (1970– ), climatologist, geographer
- Hendrika B. Cantwell (1925–2025), Dutch-American clinical professor of pediatrics, advocate for abused and neglected children
- Louis George Carpenter (1861–1935), engineer, mathematician #
- Katherine M. Cook (1876–1962), educator and government official who specialized in rural education
- John Cotton Dana (1856–1929), librarian, museum director #
- Gertrude Crotty Davenport (1866–1946), biologist, eugenicist
- David Brion Davis (1927–2019), Sterling Professor of History at Yale University and director of Yale's Gilder Lehrman Center for the Study of Slavery, Resistance, and Abolition
- Edwina Hume Fallis (1876–1957), educator, writer, toy designer
- Gabriel Finkelstein (1963– ), historian #
- Alan Fowler (1928–2024), physicist
- Margaret Hayes Grazier (1916–1999), librarian, educator
- Margaret Storrs Grierson (1900–1997), archivist, philosophy professor
- John L. Hall (1934– ), physicist
- Donna Haraway (1944– ), feminist studies scholar, sociologist
- Orin Hargraves (1953– ), lexicographer
- Robert Heizer (1915–1979), archaeologist
- Arnold Kramish (1923–2010), nuclear physicist
- Tony Laubach, meteorologist with the TWISTEX team
- Henry F. May (1915–2012), historian
- David Messerschmitt (1945– ), electrical engineer
- Seeley G. Mudd (1895–1968), physician, professor, philanthropist
- Rob Nelson (1979– ), biologist, documentary filmmaker
- John W. Olmsted (1903–1986), historian
- Renee Rabinowitz (1934–2020), psychologist and lawyer #
- Robert Reid (1924–2006), engineer
- Paul Romer (1955– ), economist
- Tim Samaras (1957–2013), engineer, meteorologist
- Ann Linnea Sandberg (1938–2009), immunologist§
- John Searle (1932– ), philosopher
- Paul Stewart (1925–2015), historian #
- Willis M. Tate (1912–1989), university president
- Keith Uncapher (1922–2002), computer engineer
- Stanley M. Wagner (1932–2013), rabbi and academic #
- James Q. Wilson (1931–2012), political scientist
- Rod A. Wing (born 1957), plant geneticist
- Hannah Marie Wormington (1914–1994), archaeologist

== Arts and entertainment ==
=== Fashion ===
- Lauren Bush (1984– ), model, designer, philanthropist
- Mondo Guerra (1978– ), fashion designer, philanthropist

=== Film, television, and theatre ===
- Tim Allen (1953– ), actor, comedian
- Michael J. Anderson (1953– ), actor
- Annaleigh Ashford (1985– ), actress, singer
- Barry Atwater (1918–1978), actor
- Phil Austin (1941–2015), comedian, writer
- Dian Bachar (1970– ), actor
- Roseanne Barr (1952– ), actress, comedian#
- Barbara Bates (1925–1969), actress, singer
- Madge Bellamy (1899–1990), actress §
- Matthew Berry (1969– ), screenwriter, producer, fantasy sports analyst
- Julie Bishop (1914–2001), actress
- Josh Blue (1978– ), comedian #
- Sierra Boggess (1982 – ), actress, singer
- Tom Bower (1938–2024), actor
- Stan Brakhage (1933–2003), experimental filmmaker §
- Bobby Buntrock (1952–1974), actor
- Molly Burnett (1988-), actress
- Joseph Castanon (1997– ), actor
- Mary Jo Catlett (1938– ), actress
- Kristin Cavallari (1987– ), television personality, actress
- Adam Cayton-Holland (1980– ), comedian
- Don Cheadle (1964– ), actor §
- Marshall Colt (1948– ), actor, psychologist #
- Lillian Covillo (1921–2010), ballet dancer
- Richard C. Currier (1892–1984), film editor
- Ann B. Davis (1926–2014), actress #
- John Davis (1954– ), producer
- Ashly DelGrosso (1982– ), dancer
- Rubye De Remer (1892–1984), actress, dancer
- Scott Derrickson (1966– ), director, screenwriter
- Josephine Dillon (1884–1971), actress
- Madhuri Dixit (1967– ), actress #
- Jack Earle (1906–1952), actor, sideshow performer
- Chris Eigeman (1965– ), actor, director
- Richard Epcar (1955– ), voice actor
- Douglas Fairbanks (1883–1939), actor, director, producer, screenwriter
- David Fincher (1962– ), director, producer
- Kevin Fitzgerald (1951– ), veterinarian, comedian
- Nina Flowers (1974– ), drag queen, makeup artist, disc jockey #
- Emmett J. Flynn (1892–1937), director, screenwriter
- Rebecca Forstadt (1953– ), voice actress
- Gene Fowler (1890–1960), screenwriter, journalist
- Gene Fowler Jr. (1917–1998), film editor
- Gardiner Brothers (Michael 1995, Matthew 1999), professional Irish dancers
- Pam Grier (1949– ), actress §
- Naomi Grossman (1975– ), actress, screenwriter
- Texas Guinan (1884–1933), actress, club owner #
- Hanna R. Hall (1984– ), actress
- Maxine Elliott Hicks (1904–2000), actress
- Pat Hingle (1924–2009), actor
- Arthur Holch (1924–2010), documentary filmmaker §
- Olin Howland (1886–1959), actor
- Tommy Ivo (1936– ), actor, race car driver
- Bryce Johnson (1977– ), actor §
- Morgan Jones (1879–1951), actor
- Andy Juett (1977– ), comedian #
- Ameenah Kaplan (1974– ), actress, musician, choreographer
- Glenn Langan (1917–1991), actor
- Brandy Ledford (1969– ), actress, model
- Jack Lipson (1901–1947), actor
- Teala Loring (1922–2007), actress
- Shanti Lowry (1982- ), actress
- Justine Lupe (1989– ), actress
- John Carroll Lynch (1963– ), actor §
- Bernard McConville (1887–1961), screenwriter
- Merrill McCormick (1892–1953), actor
- Hattie McDaniel (1895–1952), actress, comedian, singer-songwriter §
- Robert A. McGowan (1901–1955), director, screenwriter
- T.J. Miller (1981– ), actor, comedian
- Gordon Mitchell (1923–2003), actor, bodybuilder
- Peg Murray (1924–2020), actress
- Adam Nix (1986– ), director, producer
- Evan Nix (1983– ), director, producer
- Danni Sue Nolan (1923–2002), actress
- Yvie Oddly (1993– ), drag queen, winner of the eleventh season of RuPaul's Drag Race
- Marie Osborne (1911–2010), actress
- Mikki Padilla (1974– ), actress, model
- Debra Paget (1933– ), actress
- Trey Parker (1969– ), actor, animator, director, screenwriter
- James D. Parriott (1950– ), writer, director, and producer
- Val Paul (1886–1962), actor, director
- Lawrence Pech (1959– ), dancer, choreographer
- Antoinette Perry (1888–1946), actress, director
- Joseph C. Phillips (1962– ), actor, political commentator
- Jeffrey Pierce (1971– ), actor
- Willow Pill (1995– ), drag queen, winner of the fourteenth season of RuPaul's Drag Race
- Ron Pinkard (1941– ), actor
- Talyah Polee (1988– ), beauty queen #
- Wayde Preston (1929–1992), actor
- Dean Reed (1938–1986), actor, singer-songwriter
- Kristen Renton (1982– ), actress
- AnnaSophia Robb (1993– ), actress
- Keith Roberts, dancer
- Mark Roberts (1921–2006), actor
- Gloria Romero (1933–2025), actress
- Shayna Rose (1983– ), actress, singer
- Karly Rothenberg (1962– ), actress
- Barbara Rush (1927–2024), actress
- Walter Sande (1906–1971), actor
- Dia Sokol Savage (1976– ), producer
- Peter Scanavino (1980– ), actor
- Russell Scott (1921–2013), clown #
- Ethel Shannon (1898–1951), actress
- Charity Shea (1983– ), actress
- Marion Shilling (1910–2004), actress
- Bradley Snedeker (1977– ), actor
- Lincoln Stedman (1907–1948), actor
- Stephen Stohn (1948– ), television producer
- Ruth Stonehouse (1892–1941), actress
- Scott Takeda (1967– ), actor, television reporter #
- Lauren Taylor, actress and singer
- Irene Tedrow (1907–1995), actress
- Ann E. Todd (1931–2020), actress
- Lester Vail (1899–1959), actor
- Marilyn Van Derbur (1937– ), beauty queen, motivational speaker
- Jan-Michael Vincent (1944–2019), actor
- Vicki Vola (1916–1985), actress
- Joseph Walker (1892–1985), cinematographer
- Nate Watt (1889–1968), director
- Michele Weaver (2011– ), actress
- James R. Webb (1909–1974), screenwriter
- Frank Welker (1946– ), voice actor
- David White (1916–1990), actor
- Jeff Whiting (1972– ), choreographer, theater director
- Rhoda Williams (1930–2006), actress
- Michael Winslow (1958– ), actor, comedian §
- Freeman Wood (1896–1956), actor
- Polly Ann Young (1908–1997), actress

=== Gaming ===
- Patrick Chapin (1980– ), trading card game player, writer

=== Journalism ===
- Adele Arakawa (1958– ), news anchor #
- Asha Blake (1961– ), news anchor #
- Marshall Bloom (1944–1969), editor, alternative press entrepreneur
- Shareen Blair Brysac (1939– ), editor, non-fiction writer, documentary producer
- Caroline Nichols Churchill (1833–1926), newspaper publisher, feminist #
- Ted Conover (1958– ), journalist, non-fiction writer §
- J. Campbell Cory (1867–1925), cartoonist (Rocky Mountain News and The Denver Times)
- Brian Crecente (1970– ), reporter, gaming journalist
- Doug DeMuro (1988– ), automotive columnist, reviewer, and author
- Terry Drinkwater (1936–1989), television reporter
- George F. Franklin (1852–1901), newspaper publisher #
- Amy Freeze (1974– ), television meteorologist #
- Malcom Glenn (1987– ), newspaper reporter, commentator
- Miriam Goldberg (1916–2017), newspaper publisher, editor
- Sharon Tyler Herbst (1942–2007), food journalist, culinary book author §
- Bill Hosokawa (1915–2007), newspaper reporter, editor #
- Jeremy Hubbard (1972– ), news anchor #
- Bonnie Leman (1926–2010), founder and editor of Quilters' Newsletter Magazine #
- Amber Lyon (1982– ), photojournalist
- Jack Murphy (1923–1980), sports columnist, editor
- Reynelda Muse (1946– ), news anchor #
- Art Rascon (1962– ), news anchor §
- Joy Ann Reid (1968– ), political commentator, MSNBC anchor #
- T.R. Reid (1943– ), reporter #
- Rick Reilly (1958– ), sportswriter #
- Jon Scott (1958– ), news anchor
- August Skamenca (1981– ), radio correspondent §
- Harry Smith (1951– ), television reporter, news anchor #
- Clara Sears Taylor (1876–after 1938), journalist, first woman appointed to the Washington DC rent commission
- Richard Two Elk (1952– ), journalist, radio host, American Indian activist #
- David Von Drehle (1961– ), reporter, editor

=== Literature ===
- Poe Ballantine (1955– ), novelist, essayist
- Robin Blaser (1925–2009), poet, essayist
- Libbie Block (1910–1972), short story writer, novelist
- Catharine Savage Brosman (1934– ), poet, essayist, French literature scholar
- Marilyn Brown (1938– ), novelist, poet
- Neal Cassady (1926–1968), poet §
- Mary Chase (1906–1981), playwright
- Penny Colman (1944– ), author, essayist
- J. V. Cunningham (1911–1985), poet, literary critic §
- Steven Dietz (1958– ), playwright
- John Dolan (1955– ), poet, essayist
- Bruce Ducker (1938– ), novelist, poet #
- John Dunning (1942–2023), novelist #
- John Fante (1909–1983), novelist, screenwriter, short story writer
- Thomas Hornsby Ferril (1896–1988), poet, essayist
- Bill Finger (1914–1974), comics writer
- Thomas E. Gaddis (1908–1984), non-fiction writer
- Noah Eli Gordon (1975– ), poet #
- Deatt Hudson (1931–1988), educator and writer
- Sallie M. Mills Johnson (1862-1927), American author and poet
- Leigh Kennedy (1951– ), novelist, short story writer
- Harry N. MacLean (1943– ), true crime writer, novelist
- L. E. Modesitt Jr. (1943– ), novelist
- Elizabeth Robinson (1961– ), poet
- L. Neil Smith (1946–2021), novelist, libertarian activist
- Suzi Q. Smith (1979– ), poet
- Lenora Mattingly Weber (1895–1971), novelist, short story writer §
- Connie Willis (1945– ), novelist, short story writer

=== Music ===
- Ailee (1989– ), singer, actress
- India Arie (1975– ), singer-songwriter
- Philip Bailey (1951– ), singer-songwriter
- Brandon Barnes (1972– ), drummer
- Bill Barwick, singer-songwriter, guitarist, voiceover artist #
- Chuck Berghofer (1937– ), bassist
- Tommy Bolin (1951–1976), guitarist #
- Antonia Brico (1902–1989), conductor, pianist #
- John Browning (1933–2003), pianist
- Wayne Carson (1943–2015), songwriter, country musician
- Eleanor Caulkins (1936– ), opera patron #
- Robert N. Cavarra (1934–2008), composer, organist, harpsichordist, pianist and musicologist
- Judy Collins (1939– ), singer-songwriter §
- John Common (1971– ), singer-songwriter, guitarist #
- Walt Conley (1929–2003), folk singer, musician and actor
- Marty Cooper (1946– ), singer-songwriter
- David Cornwall (1937–2006), composer
- Brad Corrigan (1974– ), guitarist, singer
- Pearl G. Curran (1875–1941), composer, librettist
- Deuce Mob, rap duo
- Fannie Charles Dillon (1881–1947), pianist, composer
- Larry Dunn (1953– ), keyboardist
- Shane Endsley, trumpeter
- Flobots, hip-hop band
- Mary Flower, guitarist, singer #
- Eugene Fodor (1950–2011), violinist
- Guy Forsyth (1968– ), singer-songwriter, guitarist
- The Fray, rock band
- Harry Lawrence Freeman (1869–1954), composer, conductor #
- Bill Frisell (1951– ), guitarist, composer §
- Frank Gagliardi (1931–2011), percussionist, composer
- Teri Gender Bender (1989– ), singer, guitarist
- Ben Goldberg (1959– ), clarinetist, composer
- John Grant (1968– ), singer-songwriter §
- Corey Harris (1969– ), guitarist, singer
- Keith Hoerig (1972– ), bass guitarist §
- Peanuts Hucko (1918–2003), clarinetist, bandleader #
- Cory Kendrix (1988– ), musician
- Little Fyodor, disc jockey, singer-songwriter #
- Jerry Livingston (1909–1987), songwriter, pianist
- The Lumineers, folk rock band
- Jimmie Lunceford (1902–1947), saxophonist, bandleader §
- Edwin McArthur (1907–1987), conductor, pianist, accompanist
- Ron Miles (1963– ), trumpeter, cornetist §
- Todd Park Mohr (1965– ), singer-songwriter, guitarist
- Robert Moran (1937– ), composer
- Stephen L. Mosko (1947–2005), composer
- OneRepublic, pop rock band §
- Nick Perito (1924–2005), composer, arranger
- Pretty Lights (1981– ), electronic musician, real name Derek Smith
- Dianne Reeves (1956– ), singer §
- Reese Roper (1973– ), singer-songwriter
- David Schmitt (1988– ), musical artist of Breathe Carolina
- Isaac Slade (1981– ), singer-songwriter, pianist
- Jill Sobule (1961– ), singer-songwriter
- Tag Team, hip-hop group
- Donnette Thayer (1958– ), singer-songwriter, guitarist §
- Tyler Ward (1988– ), singer-songwriter
- John Warne (1979– ), bassist #
- Kip Winger (1961– ), singer, bassist, composer
- Ace Young (1980– ), singer-songwriter

=== Other visual arts ===
- George Elbert Burr (1859–1939), painter, printmaker #
- Richard L. Crowther (1910–2006), architect #
- Tomory Dodge (1974– ), painter
- Jess E. DuBois (1934–2022), painter, sculptor, glass artist
- Robert Heinecken (1931–2006), photographer
- Amal Kassir (1995– ), spoken word poet
- Vance Kirkland (1904–1981), painter §
- Alvin Lustig (1915–1955), graphic designer
- Ron McQueeney (1945– ), photographer
- Pat Oliphant (1935– ), cartoonist §

== Business ==
- Philip Anschutz (1939– ), investment magnate, philanthropist #
- Norman R. Augustine (1935– ), aerospace executive
- Anthony R. Barringer (1925–2009), geophysicist, inventor #
- Sheldon Beren (1922–1996), petroleum executive #
- Molly Brown (1867–1932), philanthropist, Titanic survivor #
- Luther A. Cole (1812–1880), milling entrepreneur #
- Barbara Davis (1929– ), philanthropist #
- John Elitch (1852–1891), restaurateur, zookeeper #
- William Gray Evans (1855–1911), transportation executive #
- Oliver Parker Fritchle (1874–1951), chemist, energy entrepreneur #
- Jack J. Grynberg (1932–2021), oil and gas entrepreneur #
- Marie Guiraud (1830–1909), rancher #
- Frederic C. Hamilton (1927–2016), oil and gas entrepreneur #
- Ruth Handler (1916–2002), toy executive, Barbie creator
- Samuel Hartsel (1834–1918), rancher #
- Bela M. Hughes (1817–1903), railroad businessman
- Margaret Isely (1921–1997), peace activist and co-founder of WCPA and Natural Grocers by Vitamin Cottage
- Philip Isely (1915–2012), peace activist, writer and co-founder of WCPA-GREN and Natural Grocers by Vitamin Cottage
- Frances Wisebart Jacobs (1843–1892), philanthropist #
- Kayvan Khalatbari (1983– ), marijuana entrepreneur, restaurateur #
- Luther Kountze (1842–1918), banker #
- William Larimer, Jr. (1809–1875), land developer, co-founder of Denver #
- Bryan Leach, founder and CEO of Ibotta
- Daniel M. Lewin (1970–2001), mathematician, technology entrepreneur
- Gary Magness (1954– ), investment executive, film producer #
- Tom Martino (1953– ), consumer advocate, talk radio host
- James Smith McDonnell (1899–1980), engineer, aviation entrepreneur
- Helen M. McLoraine (1918–2003), philanthropist #
- Larry Mizel (1942– ), real estate executive
- Albert Mooney (1906–1986), aircraft designer, aviation entrepreneur
- John Kernan Mullen (1847–1929), milling executive, philanthropist #
- Jack O'Neill (1923–2017), surfwear entrepreneur
- Daddy Bruce Randolph (1900–1994), barbecue pitmaster and philanthropist in Five Points
- Milton Schayer (1876–1935), stock and bond entrepreneur
- Caswell Silver (1916–1988), geologist, oil and gas entrepreneur #
- Robert F. Smith, investor and CEO, Vista Equity Partners
- Manick Sorcar, animator, lighting engineer #
- Russell Stover (1888–1954), candymaker #
- Harry Heye Tammen (1856–1924), co-owner of The Denver Times
- Kenneth D. Tuchman (1959– ), call center entrepreneur #
- Madam C. J. Walker (1867–1919), beauty products entrepreneur #
- Bethuel M. Webster (1900–1989), lawyer and founder of Webster & Sheffield
- Jean Yancey (1914–2000), women's small business consultant, motivational speaker

== Crime ==
- Alice Maud Hartley, killed Nevada State Senator Murray D. Foley by gunshot in 1894; lived in Denver in the early 1900s
- Canada Bill Jones (1840–1877), card sharp, con artist
- L. H. Musgrove (1832–1868), thief, alleged murderer
- Katherine Ann Power (1949– ), bank robber
- Terry Peder Rasmussen (1943–2010), serial killer
- Soapy Smith (1860–1898), con artist, gangster #
- Anna Blythe Speas (1869–1898), alleged accessory to murder #

=== Law enforcement ===
- Duane "Dog" Chapman (1953– ), bounty hunter
- Leland Chapman (1976– ), bounty hunter §
- Lyssa Chapman (1987– ), bounty hunter
- David J. Cook (1840–1907), lawman, Denver city marshal #
- Bat Masterson (1853–1921), gunfighter, journalist, lawman #

== Medicine ==
- Jenette H. Bolles (1863–1930), osteopath, Board of Medical Examiners, publisher #
- Sean Colgan, medical researcher
- Lisa Damour (1970–), clinical psychologist, author, national news regular and co-host of Ask Lisa podcast
- Justina Ford (1871–1952), gynecologist, obstetrician, pediatrician #
- Frances McConnell-Mills (1900–1975), forensic pathologist, toxicologist #
- Carl Rüedi (1848–1901), pulmonologist #
- Dr. Joseph H.P. Westbrook (1878-1939), Physician, Surgeon
- Aajonus Vonderplanitz, primal nutritionist

== Military ==
- Charles Adams (1845–1895), Colorado Militia brigadier general, Indian agent #
- Gerald P. Carr (1932–2020), U.S. Marine Corps colonel, astronaut
- John Chivington (1821–1894), U.S. Army colonel, leader of the Sand Creek massacre #
- Carol Rymer Davis (1944–2010), U.S. Army Reserve colonel, balloonist
- Elmer E. Fryar (1914–1944), U.S. Army private, Medal of Honor recipient
- Irving Hale (1861–1930), brigadier general of the United States §
- Clayton P. Kerr (1900–1977), U.S. Army major general
- Victor H. Krulak (1913–2008), U.S. Marine Corps lieutenant general
- John Mosley (1921–2015), U.S. Air Force lieutenant colonel, one of the Tuskegee Airmen
- Fitzroy Newsum (1918–2013), U.S. Air Force colonel, one of the Tuskegee Airmen #
- Daniel Noce (1894–1976), U.S. Army lieutenant general
- Ronald A. Route (1949– ), U.S. Navy vice admiral
- Donald Schmuck (1915–2004), U.S. Marine Corps brigadier general §
- August Schomburg (1908–1972), U.S. Army lieutenant general
- Silas Soule (1838–1865), U.S. Army brevet major, remembered for disobeying orders to take part in the Sand Creek Massacre #
- Jack Swigert (1931–1982), U.S. Air Force captain, astronaut
- Kenneth Walker (1898–1943), U.S. Army brigadier general, Medal of Honor recipient, Killed in action during World War II §
- Keith L. Ware (1915–1968), U.S. Army major general, Medal of Honor recipient, Killed in action during the Vietnam War
- J. Hunter Wickersham (1890–1918), U.S. Army 2nd lieutenant, Medal of Honor recipient #
- Edward W. Wynkoop (1836–1891), U.S. Army brevet lieutenant colonel, Indian agent, Denver co-founder #

== Politics ==
=== National ===
- Madeleine Albright (1937–2022), 64th U.S. secretary of state §
- Israel Amter (1881–1954), Communist Party USA founding member, activist
- Abdulrahman al-Awlaki (1995–2011), son of Anwar al-Awlaki
- Jim Bates (1941– ), U.S. representative from California
- Michael Bennet (1964– ), U.S. senator from Colorado #
- Don Bonker (1937–2023), U.S. representative from Washington
- Emily Gibson Braerton (1886–1966), vice president of Daughters of the American Revolution #
- Charles F. Brannan (1903–1992), 14th U.S. Secretary of Agriculture
- Henry P. H. Bromwell (1823–1903), U.S. representative from Illinois #
- Hank Brown (1940– ), U.S. senator from Colorado
- Anne Gorsuch Burford (1942–2004), 4th administrator of the Environmental Protection Agency §
- Richard Girnt Butler (1918–2004), white supremacist, Aryan Nations founder
- Kat Cammack (1988– ), representative for Florida
- Yadira Caraveo (born 1980), U.S. representative for Colorado
- John A. Carroll (1901–1983), U.S. senator from Colorado
- Arnold A. Chacón (1956– ), U.S. Ambassador to Guatemala
- Jerome B. Chaffee (1825–1886), U.S. senator from Colorado, co-founder of Denver #
- Oscar L. Chapman (1896–1978), 34th U.S. Secretary of the Interior #
- Edward P. Costigan (1874–1939), U.S. senator from Colorado #
- William C. Cramer (1922–2003), U.S. representative From Florida
- Diana DeGette (1957– ), U.S. representative from Colorado §
- Peter H. Dominick (1915–1981), U.S. senator from Colorado #
- John Eisenhower (1922–2013), 45th U.S. Ambassador to Belgium
- Mamie Eisenhower (1896–1979), 36th First Lady of the United States §
- Gladstone Ferrie (1892–1955), Canadian member of Parliament from Saskatchewan
- Sherman Glenn Finesilver (1927–2006), U.S. federal judge
- Robert Stephen Ford (1958– ), U.S. Ambassador to Syria
- Frank Freyer (1878–1930), 14th naval governor of Guam #
- Stephen Gaskin (1935–2014), countercultural activist, writer
- Rodolfo Gonzales (1928–2005), Chicano Movement activist
- Neil Gorsuch (1967– ), associate justice of the Supreme Court of the United States
- Ken Hamblin (1940– ), conservative talk radio host #
- Dorothy Ray Healey (1914–2006), Communist Party USA activist
- Nathaniel P. Hill (1832–1900), U.S. senator from Colorado #
- Edwin C. Johnson (1884–1970), U.S. senator from Colorado, 26th and 34th governor of Colorado #
- Charles West Kendall (1828–1914), U.S. representative from Nevada #
- John Kerry (1943– ), U.S. secretary of state since 2013, former long-time U.S. senator from Massachusetts (1985–2013), and 2004 Democratic nominee for president
- Carlotta Walls LaNier (1942– ), one of the Little Rock Nine #
- Homer Lea (1876–1912), geopolitical strategist, adviser to Sun Yat-sen
- Rodger McFarlane (1955–2009), gay rights activist #
- Golda Meir (1898–1978), 4th prime minister of Israel §
- George Moose (1944– ), U.S. Ambassador to the United Nations §
- Michael R. Murphy (1947– ), U.S. federal judge
- Jackson Orr (1832–1926), U.S. representative from Iowa #
- Thomas M. Patterson (1839–1916), U.S. senator from Colorado #
- Federico Peña (1947– ), 12th U.S. Secretary of Transportation, 8th U.S. Secretary of Energy #
- Dana Perino (1972– ), White House Press Secretary §
- Lawrence C. Phipps (1862–1958), U.S. senator from Colorado #
- John Carbone Porfilio (1934– ), U.S. federal judge
- Condoleezza Rice (1954– ), 66th U.S. Secretary of State #
- Josephine Roche (1886–1976), U.S. Assistant Secretary of the Treasury #
- Andrew J. Rogers (1828–1900), U.S. representative from New Jersey #
- Karl Rove (1950– ), Deputy White House Chief of Staff
- Nicholas Sarwark (1979– ), Libertarian Party politician
- Brad Schneider (1961– ), U.S. representative from Illinois
- Patricia Schroeder (1940–2023), U.S. representative from Colorado #
- Alan K. Simpson (1931– ), U.S. senator from Wyoming
- Horace Tabor (1830–1899), U.S. senator from Colorado, 2nd lieutenant governor of Colorado #
- Tom Tancredo (1945– ), U.S. representative from Colorado
- William L. Tierney (1876–1958), U.S. representative from Connecticut #
- Aleta Arthur Trauger (1945– ), U.S. federal judge
- Timothy Tymkovich (1956– ), U.S. federal judge
- Byron White (1917–2002), U.S. Supreme Court justice #
- Edward O. Wolcott (1848–1905), U.S. senator from Colorado #

=== State ===
- Robert E. Allen (1924–2014), Colorado state legislator #
- Teller Ammons (1895–1972), 28th governor of Colorado
- Matt Bevin (1967– ), 62nd governor of Kentucky
- Kermit Brown (1942– ), Wyoming state legislator
- William Byers (1831–1905), Nebraska territorial legislator #
- Job Adams Cooper (1843–1899), 6th governor of Colorado #
- Lois Court (1953– ), Colorado state legislator
- Mat Erpelding (1975– ), Idaho state legislator
- Mark Ferrandino (1977– ), Colorado state legislator #
- Frank Frantz (1872–1941), 7th governor of Oklahoma Territory #
- Don Friedman (1930–2013), Colorado state legislator, talk radio host
- John Frullo (1962– ), Texas state legislator #
- Peter Groff (1963– ), Colorado state legislator #
- Lucía Guzmán (1951– ), Colorado state legislator #
- John Hickenlooper (1952– ), 42nd governor of Colorado, U.S. Senator from Colorado #
- Bela M. Hughes (1817–1903), Territorial councillor
- Gloria Johnson (1962– ), Tennessee state legislator
- Joel Judd (1951– ), Colorado state legislator
- Wayne Knox (1927–2019), Colorado state legislator
- Jeanne Labuda (1947–2022), Colorado state legislator #
- Alma V. Lafferty (1864–1928), served two terms in Colorado House of Representatives 1908–1912
- Beth McCann (1949– ), Colorado state legislator #
- Stephen L.R. McNichols (1914–1997), 35th governor of Colorado
- Helen Milliken (1922–2012), former First Lady of Michigan
- Mary Mullarkey (1943–2021), Colorado Supreme Court chief justice #
- Sue Mullins (1936– ), Iowa state legislator
- Dan Pabon (1977– ), Colorado state legislator
- George Alexander Parks (1883–1984), 5th governor of Alaska Territory
- Josh Penry (1976– ), Colorado state legislator
- Dianne Primavera (1950– ), Colorado state legislator
- Jim Riesberg (1942– ), Colorado state legislator
- Bill Ritter (1956– ), 41st governor of Colorado #
- Andrew Romanoff (1966– ), Colorado state legislator #
- Chris Romer (1959– ), Colorado state legislator
- Brandon Shaffer (1971– ), Colorado state legislator
- Pat Steadman (1964– ), Colorado state legislator #
- Ken Summers (1953– ), Colorado state legislator
- William Ellery Sweet (1869–1942), 23rd governor of Colorado #
- Gloria Tanner (1935–2022), Colorado state legislator #
- Russell T. Thane (1926–2020), North Dakota state legislator
- Fred Van Valkenburg (1948– ), Montana state legislator
- Michael Webert (1979– ), Virginia state legislator
- Angela Williams, Colorado state legislator #
- Mariko Yamada (1950– ), California state legislator

=== Local ===
- Lorraine Granado (1948–2019), environmental, peace and social justice activist and organizer who co-founded the Colorado People's Environmental and Economic Network and Neighbors for a Toxic-Free Community in Denver
- John E. Manders (1895–1973), 17th Mayor of Anchorage, Alaska
- William McGaa (1824–1867), mountain man, co-founder of Denver #
- Rachel Noel (1918–2008), Denver politician, civil rights activist #
- Wellington Webb (1941– ), 42nd mayor of Denver #

== Religion ==
- Robert S. Bilheimer (1917–2006), Presbyterian theologian
- Nadia Bolz-Weber (1969– ), Lutheran minister, comedian
- Bill Carmody (1957–2016), Roman Catholic priest, anti-abortion activist
- George Roche Evans (1922–1985), Roman Catholic bishop
- William S. Friedman (1868–1944), Reform rabbi
- Julia Greeley (ca.1833–1918), Roman Catholic Servant of God, ex-slave
- J. Edward Guinan, former Paulist priest who founded the Community for Creative Non-Violence when he was chaplain of George Washington University
- Richard Charles Patrick Hanifen (1931– ), Roman Catholic bishop
- Danan Henry (1939– ), Zen roshi
- Sheldon Jackson (1834–1909), Presbyterian missionary #
- Charles E. H. Kauvar (1879–1971), Conservative rabbi
- Abraham Klausner (1915–2007), Reform rabbi §
- Jerry Lamb (1940– ), Episcopal bishop
- Harold B. Lee (1899–1973), Denver mission leader and later president of the Church of Jesus Christ of Latter-day Saints
- Reed Lessing (1959– ), Lutheran pastor, theologian
- Donald Montrose (1923–2008), Roman Catholic bishop
- Hubert Newell (1904–1987), Roman Catholic bishop
- R. Walker Nickless (1947– ), Roman Catholic bishop
- Alysa Stanton (1964– ), Reform rabbi §
- Mary Luke Tobin (1908–2006), Roman Catholic nun

== Sports ==
=== American football ===
- Tom Ashworth (1977– ), offensive tackle
- Dave Baldwin (1955– ), coach
- David Bowens (1977– ), linebacker
- C. J. Brewer (1982– ), wide receiver §
- Chris Brewer (1962– ), running back
- Patrick Cain (1962–2016), center, guard
- Calais Campbell (1986– ), defensive end
- Dyshod Carter (1978– ), cornerback
- Ryan Clement (1975– ), quarterback
- Eric Coleman (1966– ), cornerback
- Mark Cooney (1951–2011), linebacker
- Adrian Cooper (1968– ), tight end
- Jason Craft (1976– ), cornerback
- Brian Daniels (1984– ), guard
- James Darling (1974– ), linebacker
- Drew Davis (1989– ), wide receiver
- John Denney (1978– ), long snapper
- Ryan Denney (1977– ), defensive end
- Ron Dickerson, Jr. (1971– ), running back, wide receiver, coach
- Ben Dreith (1925–2021), referee
- John Elway (1960– ), Hall of Fame quarterback, manager #
- Keith English (1966–2010), punter
- Tom Erlandson (1966– ), linebacker
- Bill Frank (1938–2014), offensive tackle
- Trent Gamble (1977– ), safety
- Fred Gayles (1966– ), linebacker, wide receiver
- Joe Germaine (1975– ), quarterback
- Pat Haggerty (1927–1994), referee
- Herman Heard (1961– ), running back
- Ryan Hewitt (1991– ), tight end
- Marcus Houston (1981– ), tailback
- Mike Johnson (1943–2003), cornerback
- Ray Johnson (1914–1990), defensive back
- Greg Jones (1974– ), linebacker
- Brandon Kaufman (1990– ), wide receiver
- Jimmie Kaylor (1984– ), punter
- Joe Klopfenstein (1983– ), tight end
- Steve Korte (1960– ), center, offensive guard
- Terry Kunz (1952– ), running back
- Zach Latimer (1983– ), linebacker
- DeWayne Lewis (1985– ), cornerback §
- Jody Littleton (1974– ), long snapper
- John Lynch (1971– ), strong safety #
- Peyton Manning (1976– ), quarterback #
- Kevin McDougal (1977– ), running back
- Donald McKillip (1924–2008), coach
- Ostell Miles (1970– ), running back
- Mark Mullaney (1953– ), defensive end
- Mike Perez (1963– ), quarterback
- Vince Phason (1953–2018), defensive back
- Tyler Polumbus (1985– ), offensive tackle
- Mike Price (1946– ), coach
- Greg Primus (1970– ), wide receiver
- Gary Richard (1965– ), defensive back
- Derrick Richardson (1986– ), safety
- Cory Ross (1982– ), running back, coach
- Chris Sanders (1972– ), wide receiver
- Bo Scaife (1981– ), tight end
- Mark Schlereth (1966– ), guard, sports commentator #
- Brian Schottenheimer (1973– ), coach
- J. K. Scott (1996– ), punter
- Shannon Sharpe (1968– ), tight end, sports commentator #
- Nate Solder (1988– ), offensive tackle
- Ben Steele (1978– ), tight end
- Freddie Joe Steinmark (1949–1971), safety
- Red Stephens (1930–2003), guard
- Andre Strode (1972– ), defensive back
- Kasey Studdard (1984– ), offensive guard
- David Tate (1964– ), safety
- Marvin Washington (1965– ), defensive end
- Allen Webb (1983– ), quarterback
- Jack Weil (1962– ), punter
- LenDale White (1984– ), running back
- Andre Woolfolk (1980– ), cornerback

=== Baseball ===
- David Aardsma (1981– ), relief pitcher
- Darrel Akerfelds (1962–2012), pitcher, bullpen coach
- Bubbles Anderson (1904–1943), infielder
- Ty Blach (1990– ), pitcher for the San Francisco Giants
- Cory Blaser (1981– ), umpire
- Nick Capra (1958– ), outfielder
- Idona Crigler (1922–1994), infielder
- Mona Denton (1922–1995), pitcher
- Bruce Egloff (1965– ), pitcher
- Johnny Frederick (1902–1977), outfielder
- Kyle Freeland (1993– ), pitcher for the Colorado Rockies
- Ralph Glaze (1881–1968), pitcher
- Buddy Gremp (1919–1995), 1st baseman
- Roy Halladay (1977–2017), starting pitcher
- Ron Herbel (1938–2000), pitcher
- Jason Hirsh (1982– ), starting pitcher #
- Luke Hochevar (1983– ), pitcher
- Brian Holman (1965– ), pitcher
- Bob Howsam (1918–2008), manager, sports entrepreneur
- Virgil Jester (1927–2016), pitcher
- Pierce Johnson (1991– ), pitcher
- Mark Knudson (1960– ), pitcher
- Bruce Konopka (1919–1996), 1st baseman
- Dud Lee (1899–1971), shortstop
- Mike Madden (1958– ), pitcher
- Frank Martin (1878–1942), 3rd baseman
- Gabe Molina (1975– ), pitcher
- Buzz Murphy (1895–1938), outfielder
- George Myatt (1914–2000), 2nd baseman, coach, manager
- Travis Schlichting (1984– ), pitcher
- John Stearns (1951–2022), catcher, manager, scout
- Joe Strain (1954– ), 2nd baseman, shortstop
- Mike Wegener (1946– ), pitcher
- Charlie Williams (1943–2005), umpire
- Clint Zavaras (1967– ), pitcher

=== Basketball ===
- Tom Asbury (1945– ), coach
- J. B. Bickerstaff (1979– ), coach
- Chauncey Billups (1976– ), point guard, shooting guard
- Rodney Billups (1983– ), guard, coach
- Kevin Bromley (1959– ), coach
- Joe Barry Carroll (1958– ), center §
- Alysha Clark (1987– ), American-Israeli forward
- Pam DeCosta (1964– ), coach
- Kaniel Dickens (1978– ), small forward
- Rick Fisher (1948–2019), power forward
- Kevin Fletcher (1980– ), center, power forward
- Ronnie Harrell (1996– ), basketball player for Hapoel Gilboa Galil of the Israeli Basketball Premier League
- Shae Kelley (1991– ), forward
- Darrick Martin (1971– ), point guard
- Eric McWilliams (1950– ), power forward
- Paul Millsap power forward
- Shelly Pennefather (1966– ), forward
- Josh Perkins (1995– ), point guard
- Micheal Ray Richardson (1955– ), point guard, shooting guard, coach §
- Michael Ruffin (1977– ), center, power forward
- Eric Schraeder (1977– ), forward
- Ronnie Shavlik (1933–1983), forward
- Brendan Winters (1983– ), shooting guard

=== Boxing ===
- Eddie Eagan (1897–1967), U.S. Olympic boxer, U.S. Olympic bobsledder
- John David Jackson (1963– ), middleweight boxer
- Stevie Johnston (1972– ), lightweight boxer
- Ron Lyle (1941–2011), heavyweight boxer §
- Louis Monaco (1968– ), heavyweight boxer
- Terri Moss (1966– ), strawweight boxer

=== Cycling ===
- Richard Ball (1944– ), U.S. Olympic cyclist
- Gregory Daniel (1994– ), cyclist
- Alison Dunlap (1969– ), cyclist
- Greg Herbold (1962– ), cyclist
- Ron Kiefel (1960– ), cyclist
- Jonathan Vaughters (1973– ), cyclist, manager

=== Golf ===
- Tommy Armour III (1959– ), golfer
- Shane Bertsch (1970– ), golfer
- Joan Birkland (1928–2019), state women's amateur golf champion
- Matt Gogel (1971– ), golfer
- Tommy Jacobs (1935–2022), golfer
- Jonathan Kaye (1970– ), golfer
- Bill Loeffler (1956– ), golfer
- Jill McGill (1972– ), golfer
- Leif Olson (1981– ), golfer
- Hollis Stacy (1954– ), golfer #
- Craig Stadler (1953– ), golfer #
- Derek Tolan (1985– ), golfer
- Mark Wiebe (1957– ), golfer #

=== Ice hockey ===
- Ben Bishop (1986– ), goaltender
- Austin Block (1989– ), center and forward
- B. J. Crombeen (1985– ), right wing
- Parris Duffus (1970– ), goaltender
- Mike Eaves (1956– ), center
- John Grahame (1975– ), goaltender
- Seth Jones (1994– ), defenseman §
- Brendan Lemieux (1996– ), left wing
- Joe Noris (1951– ), center
- Joe Sakic (1969– ), center, manager #
- Drew Shore (1991– ), center
- Nick Shore (1992– ), center
- Jaccob Slavin (1994–), defenseman
- Troy Terry (1997– ), right wing
- Sean Zimmerman (1987– ), defenseman

=== Martial arts ===
- JJ Aldrich (1992– ), strawweight MMA fighter
- Donald Cerrone (1983– ), welterweight MMA fighter
- Duane Ludwig (1978– ), middleweight kickboxer, lightweight MMA fighter
- Ryan Reser (1980– ), U.S. Olympic judo fighter
- Lacey Schuckman (1988– ), strawweight MMA fighter
- Brandon Thatch (1985– ), welterweight MMA fighter
- Matt Wiman (1983– ), lightweight MMA fighter
- Trevor Wittman (1974– ), MMA trainer

=== Pro wrestling ===
- 2 Cold Scorpio (1965– ), professional wrestler
- Jake Carter (1986– ), pro wrestler
- Bison Smith (1973–2011), pro wrestler
- Eve Torres (1984– ), pro wrestler, actress, model §

=== Racing ===
- Keith Andrews (1920–1957), racecar driver
- Buzz Calkins (1971– ), Indy car driver
- Tanner Foust (1973– ), racecar driver, stunt driver
- Tom Frantz (1943–2019), racecar driver
- Robb Holland (1967– ), racecar driver
- Mel Kenealy (1903–1985), Indy car driver
- Jaques Lazier (1971– ), racecar driver
- Johnny Mauro (1910–2003), racecar driver
- Willard Prentiss (1897–1959), racecar driver
- Jerry Robertson (1962– ), NASCAR driver

=== Skiing ===
- John Jarrett (1970– ), U.S. Olympic skier
- Arturo Kinch (1956– ), U.S. Olympic skier #
- Dolores LaChapelle (1926–2007), skier, mountain climber, ecologist
- Jonathan Lujan (1971– ), Paralympic alpine skier
- Kerry Lynch (1957– ), Nordic combined skier
- Michelle Roark (1974– ), U.S. Olympic freestyle skier #
- Katy Rodolph (1930–1994), U.S. Olympic skier
- Keith R. Wegeman (1929–1974), ski jumper
- Todd Wilson (1965– ), U.S. Olympic skier
- Emilia Wint (1994– ), skier

=== Soccer ===
- Chad Ashton (1967– ), midfielder, coach
- David Bulow (1980–2021), midfielder, coach
- Rick Davis (1958– ), midfielder
- Marian Dougherty (1984– ), defender
- Roger Espinoza (1986– ), defensive midfielder, wing back §
- Brendan Hines-Ike (1994– ), defender
- Regina Holan (1977– ), striker
- Katie Hultin (1982– ), goalkeeper, coach
- Siri Mullinix (1978– ), goalkeeper, coach
- Evelyn Shores (2004– ), defender, midfielder
- Chelsea Stewart (1990– ), defender

=== Track and field ===
- Karen Anderson (1938– ), U.S. Olympic javelin thrower
- Scott Bauhs (1986– ), distance runner
- Dior Hall (1996– ), hurdler
- Ellen Hart Peña (1958– ), distance runner #
- Eddie Tolan (1908–1967), U.S. Olympic sprinter

=== Other ===
- Victor Amaya (1954– ), professional tennis player
- Heather Armbrust (1977– ), bodybuilder #
- Tom Bowen (1961– ), athletic director
- Gary Conelly (1952– ), U.S. Olympic swimmer
- Edith Connor (1935–2011), bodybuilder
- Janet Culp (1982– ), U.S. Olympic swimmer
- Lindsey Durlacher (1974–2011), Greco-Roman wrestler #
- Zach Fenoglio (1989– ), rugby hooker
- Lauren Gardner (1985– ), sportscaster
- Brian Ginsberg (1966-), gymnast, two-time US junior national gymnastics champion
- Adeline Gray (1991– ), sport wrestler
- Haley Johnson (1981– ), biathlete
- Janet Mae Johnson (1936–1973) mountaineer
- Wendy Lucero (1963– ), U.S. Olympic diver
- David McKienzie (1979– ), U.S. Olympic volleyball player
- Alina Popa (1978– ), bodybuilder #
- Meredeth Quick (1979– ), pro squash player
- Jason Regier (1975– ), Paralympic rugby player
- Britney Simpson (1996– ), figure skater
- Chris Steinfeld (1959– ), U.S. Olympic sailor
- Paul Wylie (1964– ), U.S. Olympic figure skater §
- Michael Young (1944– ), bobsledder #

== See also ==
- List of people from Colorado
- Music in Denver
- Bibliography of Colorado
- Geography of Colorado
- History of Colorado
- Index of Colorado-related articles
- List of Colorado-related lists
- Outline of Colorado
