= McGaa =

McGaa is a surname. Notable people with the surname include:

- Ed McGaa (1936–2017), American Marine and writer
- William McGaa (1824–1867), American trapper and explorer
