= Schayer =

Schayer is a surname. Notable people with the surname include:

- Bobby Schayer (born 1966), American drummer
- Julia Schayer (1842–1928), American writer
- Karol Schayer (1900–1971), Polish architect and soldier
- Milton Schayer (1876–1935), American businessman
- Richard Schayer (1880–1956), American screenwriter
- Steven Schayer (born 1965). American guitarist/singer
