= Joseph Westbrook =

American activist (1878–1939)

Joseph Henry Peter Westbrook
- Born: February 20, 1878; Hernando, Mississippi, U.S.
- Died: September 23, 1939 (aged 61); Denver, Colorado, U.S.
- Education: Rust University; Fisk University; Meharry Medical College
- Occupations: Physician; dentist; surgeon
- Known for: Infiltrating the Ku Klux Klan, Denver, Colorado
- Spouse: Laura Ann Trimble

Joseph Henry Parson Westbrook (February 20, 1878 – September 23, 1939) was a businessman, community leader, and civil-rights activist in Denver, Colorado. An African American physician and dentist who had moved to Denver from Hernando, Mississippi, Westbrook became an influential member of the city's Black community. He was also associated with the development of Dearfield, Colorado, an African American agricultural settlement in Weld County, Colorado. He was notable for infiltrating the Ku Klux Klan in Denver, and reporting on their activities during the 1920s.

== Early life and education ==
Westbrook was born in Hernando, Mississippi, to Dr. Joseph Westbrook, Sr., and Mollie Westbrook (née Walla). He was educated at Mississippi Normal School and Rust University in Holly Springs, Mississippi. He went on to attend Fisk University at Nashville, Tennessee, and subsequently studied medicine at nearby Meharry Medical College, graduating as a physician. He moved to Denver in 1906, establishing a medical practice there and becoming a member of the Denver Medical Society. He also operated a pharmacy and became active in the economic and civic development of Denver's African American community. He and the former Laura Ann Trimble married in 1904.

Westbrook was also associated with the Sigma Pi Phi (ΣΠΦ) fraternity, or The Boulé, the oldest Greek letter fraternity for African Americans, whose Denver organization became active during the early 20th century.

== Denver and Dearfield ==
Westbrook moved to Denver, Colorado, to do post-graduate work at former Denver Homeopathic Medical College. He later proved to be a highly regarded business and civic leader in Denver’s growing African American community, particularly the Five Points neighborhood. He invested in property and businesses in the area and participated in efforts to promote economic independence among African Americans in Colorado.

He was an early supporter of Dearfield, Colorado, the African American agricultural community established in Weld County by Oliver Toussaint Jackson. At a 1909 meeting concerning the proposed settlement, it was Westbrook who reportedly suggested the name "Dearfield," explaining that the land would be "very dear to us." The community subsequently became one of the most prominent Black agricultural settlements in Colorado.

== Infiltration of the Ku Klux Klan ==
Westbrook is particularly remembered for his efforts to monitor the Ku Klux Klan in Denver. During the 1920s, when the Klan had considerable political influence in Colorado, Westbrook used his light complexion to pass as white and attended Klan meetings. According to accounts preserved by the Black American West Museum and historians of Denver’s African American community, he obtained information about Klan activities and relayed warnings to members of the Black community. These undercover activities were potentially dangerous, and were undertaken at considerable personal risk. His experiences in this instance were not unlike those of the former Executive Director of the N.A.A.C.P., Walter White.

== Death ==
Westbrook died suddenly in Denver on September 23, 1939, at the age of 61. Records of Fairmount Cemetery in Denver identify him as "Joseph H.P. Westbrook, Dr.," aged 61, and duly recorded his burial there.

== Legacy ==
Westbrook is remembered as an early African American physician and community leader in the U.S., the state Colorado, and for his role in the development of African American self-reliance and community. His covert efforts to monitor the Denver Ku Klux Klan have also made him a notable figure in the history of African American resistance to racial discrimination and organized white supremacy in Colorado. The National Museum of African American History and Culture has included Westbrook among suggested Colorado topics for historical study.

== Notes ==
The Dearfield site was included in the National Register of Historic Places in 1995.

== See also ==
- History of slavery in Colorado
- List of African American pioneers of Colorado
- List of people from Denver
