= Dearfield, Colorado =

- Dearfield Settlement
- U.S. National Register of Historic Places
- U.S. Historic district
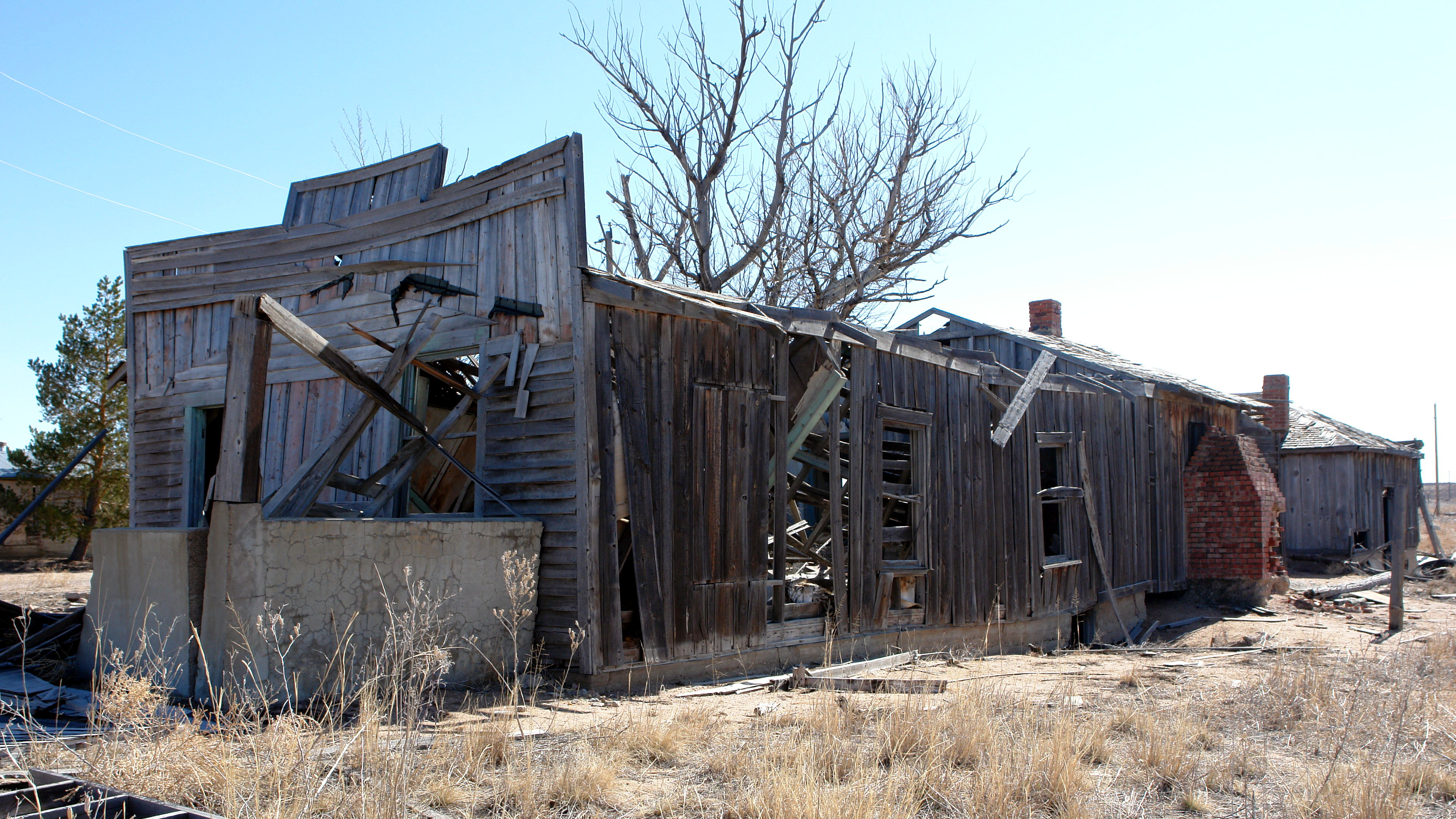
- Building in Dearfield

- Location within the United States Location within Colorado
- Location: Weld County, Colorado
- Nearest city: Wiggins, Colorado
- Coordinates: 40.2906°N 104.2594°W
- Area: 160 acres (65 ha)
- Built: 1910
- Architectural style: False front
- NRHP reference No.: 95001002
- Added to NRHP: August 4, 1995

Dearfield is an extinct town and a historically black majority settlement in Weld County, Colorado, United States. It is 30 miles (48 km) east of Greeley. The town was formed by Oliver Toussaint Jackson, who desired to create a colony for African American homesteaders. In 1910, Jackson, a successful businessman from Boulder, filed on the homestead that later became the town and began to advertise for "colonists." The name Dearfield was suggested by one of the town's citizens, Dr. J.H.P. Westbrook, who was from Denver. The word dear was chosen as the foundation for the town's name due to the precious value of the land and community to the town's settlers.

The first settlers of Dearfield had great difficulty farming the surrounding pasture and endured several harsh seasons. By 1920, the town had 200 to 300 residents, two churches, a school and restaurant. In 1921, the town's net worth was appraised at $1,075,000.

After the prosperous years of the 1920s, the Great Depression arrived and the town's agricultural success significantly declined. Settlers began to leave Dearfield in order to find better opportunities. By 1940, the town population had decreased to 12. Jackson desperately attempted to spur interest in the town, even offering it for sale. There was little interest in Dearfield. Jackson died on February 18, 1948.

A few buildings remain in Dearfield: a gas station, a diner, and the founder's home. In 1995, the town was listed on the National Register of Historic Places. In 1998, the Black American West Museum in Denver began to make attempts to preserve the town's site. It is a Colorado Registered Historic Landmark. A 2010 monument next to one of the remaining buildings contains information about the history of the site.

A 2001 state historical marker at U.S. Route 85 mile marker 264 near Evans, Colorado, includes a panel with the history of Dearfield.

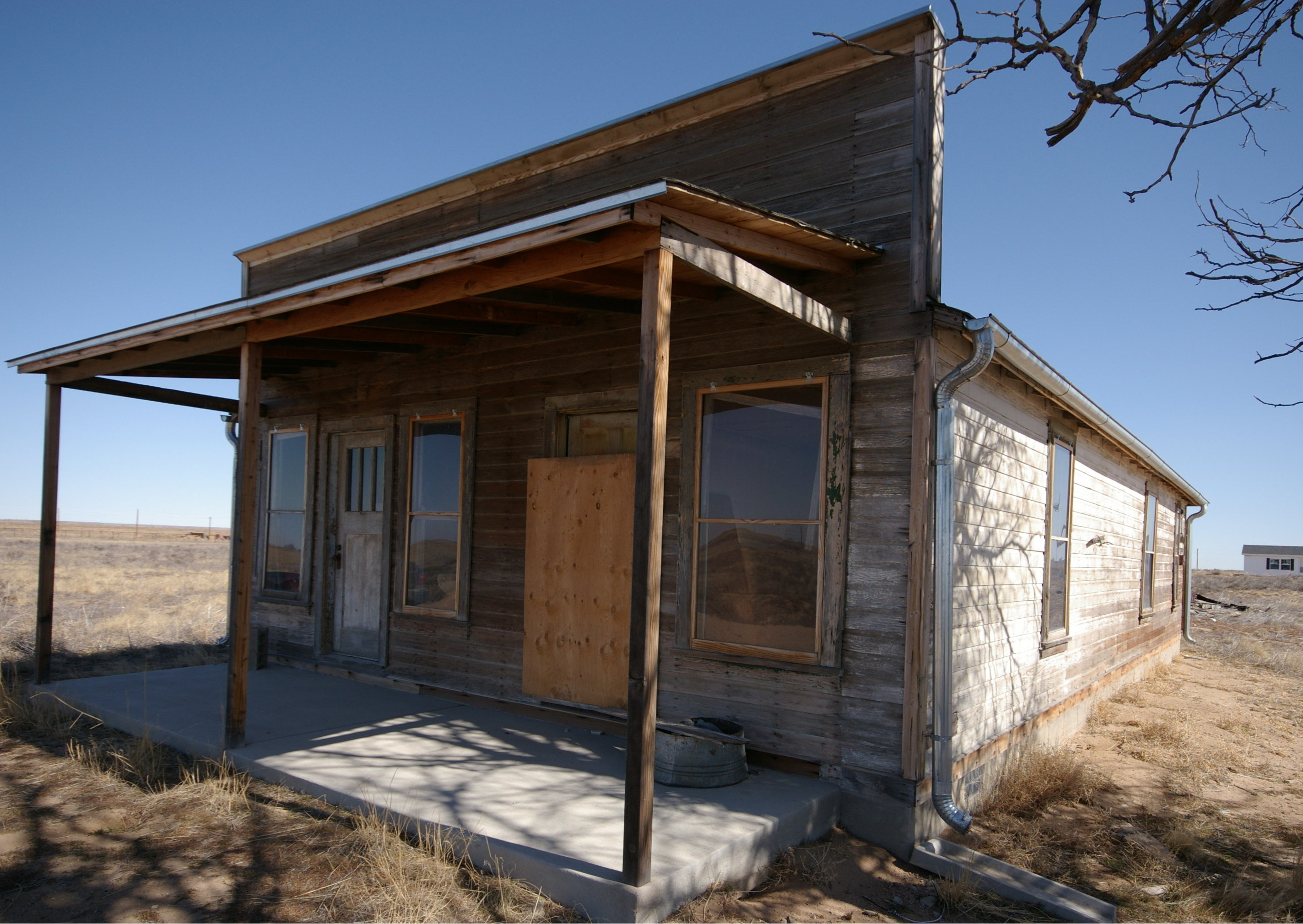
One of the buildings remaining in Dearfield, CO.

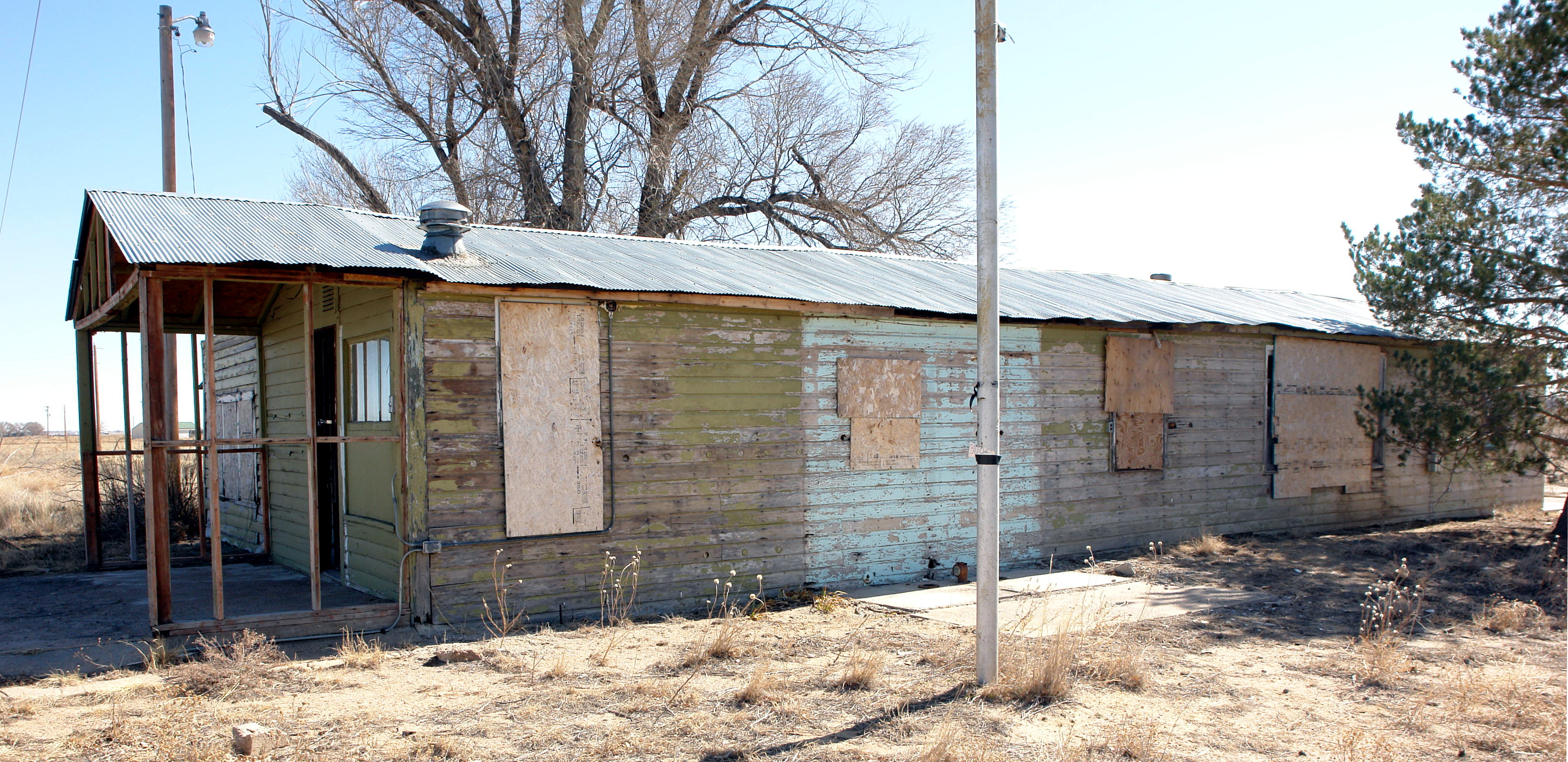
One of the buildings still standing in Dearfield

== See also ==
- List of ghost towns in Colorado
- National Register of Historic Places listings in Weld County, Colorado
