= Paul Stewart (historian) =

American historian

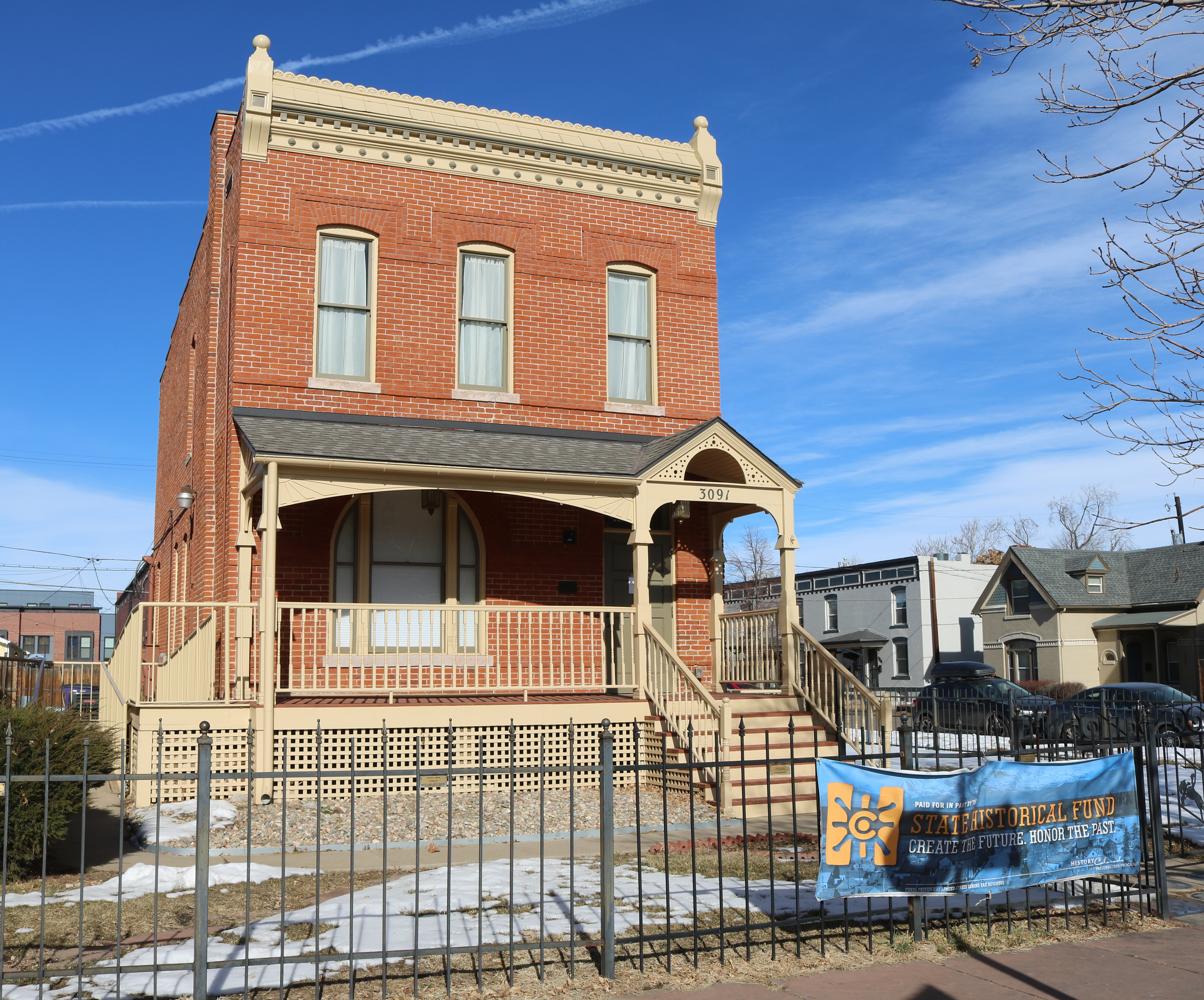
Black American West Museum and Heritage Center, Denver, Colorado

Paul Wilbur Stewart (December 18, 1925 – November 12, 2015) was an American barber and historian who founded the Black American West Museum and Heritage Center in 1971.

== Biography ==
Stewart was born in Clinton, Iowa, to Eugene Joseph Stewart and Martha L. Stewart (née Moor). He served in the United States Navy upon graduating high school, and later settled in Evanston, Illinois, with his brother. Stewart worked at the local post office while attending Roosevelt University. He dropped out to help his brother with tuition, and subsequently earned a license from Moler Barber College. He worked as a barber in Illinois, Wisconsin, and New York.

He moved to Denver in 1962 and opened a barber shop. With the help of his customers, Stewart soon began collecting Old West memorabilia. As the collection grew, it was moved multiple times.

The museum was officially established as the Black American West Museum and Heritage Center in 1971 at 221 24th Street, where it spent one year before moving to the intersection of East Colfax Avenue and Detroit Street. Stewart next moved his collection to the Clayton School for Boys in 1975. It was moved to the Five Points neighborhood in 1985, to a space on 26th and Welton Streets. The museum bought and moved into its permanent home, the Justina Ford residence on California Street and 30th Avenue, in 1988. The museum, billed as "the only Western-black-history museum in the world," highlights the history of African Americans' movement west and includes artifacts and pictorial histories of cowboys, farmers, ranchers, miners, Buffalo Soldiers, Tuskegee Airmen and the residents of the Five Points area. An exhibit dedicated to Ford remains on display in a room of the house.

Stewart was of African American and Cherokee descent, and a cousin of Earl Mann, who served in the Colorado House of Representatives. He was married to Johnnie Mae Davis from 1986 to his 2015 death in Aurora, Colorado.
