= Southern Homestead Act of 1866 =

Historical US laws

The Southern Homestead Act of 1866 was a United States federal law intended to offer land to prospective farmers, both White Americans and Black Americans, in the South following the American Civil War. It was repealed in 1876 after mostly benefiting white recipients.

== Background ==
The law was enacted to break a cycle of debt during the Reconstruction following the American Civil War. Prior to this act, black Americans and whites alike were having trouble buying land. Sharecropping and tenant farming had become ways of life. This act attempted to solve this by selling land at low prices so Southerners could buy it.

== Legislative history ==
A "Second Freedmen's Bureau bill" was introduced December 5, 1865, but was vetoed and weakened before eventually overriding a second veto by president Andrew Johnson. Championed by General Oliver O. Howard, chief of the Freedmen's Bureau, and with support from Thaddeus Stevens and William Fessenden, the Southern Homestead Act was proposed to Congress, and eventually passed, and signed into law by President Andrew Johnson on June 21, 1866, going into effect immediately. The Southern Homestead Act opened up approximately 46 million acres (72,000 sq mi; 190,000 km^{2}) of public land for sale in the Southern states of Alabama, Arkansas, Florida, Louisiana, and Mississippi. The land was initially in parcels of 80-acre (0.32 km^{2}) (half-quarter section) until June 1868, and thereafter parcels of 160-acre (0.65 km^{2}) (quarter section, or one quarter of a square mile), and homesteaders were required to occupy and improve the land for five years before acquiring full ownership.

Until January 1, 1867, the bill specified, only free Blacks and White Unionists would be allowed access to these lands. Accordingly, the primary beneficiaries for the first six months were freedmen who were in desperate need of land to till. However, the law encountered many obstacles, notably: Southern bureaucrats often did not comply with the law or with the orders of the Freedmen's Bureau, notably not informing blacks of their opportunity to acquire land; violence from competing whites; poor quality of the land; and poverty of the farmers who were often unable to effectively use the land without further money to invest. Many people also could not participate because the land prices themselves were still too high.

Ultimately, before too much land was distributed, the law was repealed in June 1876. Nevertheless, free blacks entered about 6,500 claims to homesteads, and about 1,000 of these eventually resulted in property certificates. This paled in comparison to the 28,000 white Americans who entered claims.

== See also ==
- Homestead Acts
- Black homesteaders

== Bibliography ==
- Gates, Paul Wallace (1940). "Federal Land Policy in the South 1866-1888". The Journal of Southern History. 6 (3): 303–330. doi:10.2307/2192139. JSTOR 2192139.
- Oubre, Claude F. Forty Acres and a Mule: The Freedmen's Bureau and Black Land Ownership. Louisiana State University Press, 1978.
