= Black homesteaders =

Black homesteaders were part of a larger land ownership movement in which settlers acquired and developed public lands for farming in 30 US states over a period of 100 years. The US federal government enacted these policies in areas that it wanted to populate with American citizens or prospective citizens (often to the detriment of the interests of the Native Americans who had previously occupied these lands). In total, some 30,000 black homesteaders obtained land claims in the course of this movement.

== Legislation ==
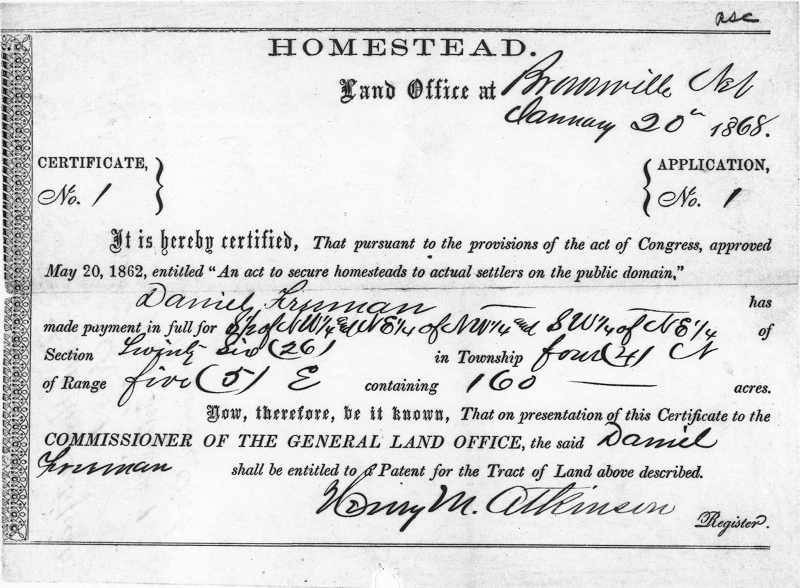
A certificate of homesteading granting title to 160 acres in the state of Nebraska, 1862

Black homesteaders established their claims under a number of different federal laws. The most significant of these was the Homestead Act of 1862, a landmark U.S. law that opened ownership of public lands to male citizens (who had never borne arms against the United States), widows, single women, and immigrants pledging to become citizens. Signed into law by Abraham Lincoln, the act allowed any adult citizen (or intended citizen) who had not taken up arms against the United States could claim 160 acres of government land. The 1866 Civil Rights Act and the Fourteenth Amendment guaranteed that African Americans were eligible as well. Tens of thousands of them availed themselves of this opportunity. In most instances, the government granted free title to the land in return for assurances that the land would be occupied and cultivated, but the claimant could also buy the land in order to be subject to less stringent obligations on land use.

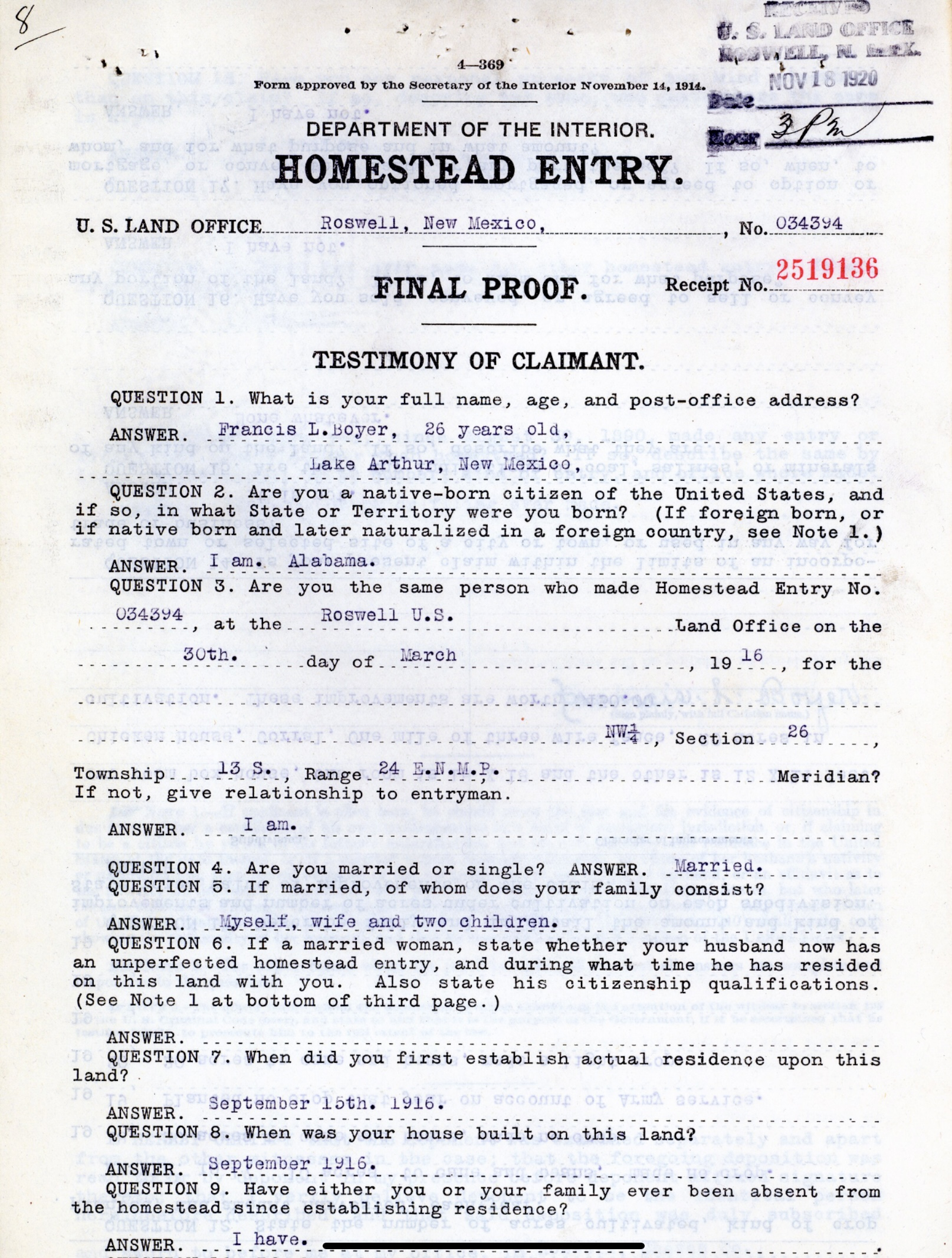
Application for homestead claim near Roswell New Mexico filed in 1920. The ‘testimony’ provides personal information about the claimant (home state is Alabama; he has a wife and 2 children; he served in the armed forces during World War I).

The Southern Homestead Act of 1866 was another significant piece of legislation. It was enacted during the Reconstruction period in order to inter alia provide a means of support to the 3.9 million former slaves freed after the Civil War. The law, however, did not limit access to former slaves; land could be claimed by anyone who “is a citizen of the United States, or who shall have filed his declaration of intention to become such.” Ultimately the opening of land benefited the white community (including large investors in forestry, mining and other sectors) far more than the freedmen community, due in part to freedmen's lack of education and resources and to the “continuing hostility and violence by whites against Black claimants.” For this reason, many blacks turned to the Great Plains for homesteading. The Southern Act was repealed in 1876.

== Motivations ==
Black homesteading developed in the post-Civil War period. At that time, the Southern agricultural economy was in shambles and major cities had been destroyed during the War. Former slaves were left without means of support following the abolition of slavery. Although the Southern Homestead Act did succeed in creating some black homesteads, the ultimate failure of legislation enacted during the era of Reconstruction to stem white violence against blacks and to provide adequate access to land provided a powerful motive for blacks to seek better opportunities elsewhere.

A study at the University of Nebraska quotes a speech given to a 1872 convention of Black southerners by Robert H. Knox (described at the time as a "prominent coloured citizen" of Montgomery, Alabama). Knox describes his change of view on the wisdom of Blacks staying in the South and his advice to conference attendees to seek opportunities elsewhere:

I yet would say let us rest here a while longer; let us trust in God .... to give us what is most needed here, personal security to the laboring masses, the suppression of violence, disorder and kukluxism .... Failing in these, it is time then, I repeat, to desert the State and seek homes elsewhere ..... where there may be enjoyed in peace and happiness by your own fireside the earnings of your daily toil.

Thus, the black homesteader movement foreshadowed the Great Migration of the mid-twentieth century during which 6 million blacks fled the South to work in northern or western states. In addition to the attraction of free land and the opportunities provided by land ownership, black homesteaders “also had in their consciousness the bitter agony of Black people’s history in the South.”

== Patterns of settlement ==
Although the homesteading applications and archives under the 1862 Act lack information on the race of the homesteaders, other sources shed light on the efforts, trials and tribulations of black homesteaders. Notably, a project at the Center for Great Plains Studies at the University of Nebraska, has compiled documentation on black homesteaders who migrated to six Great Plains states.

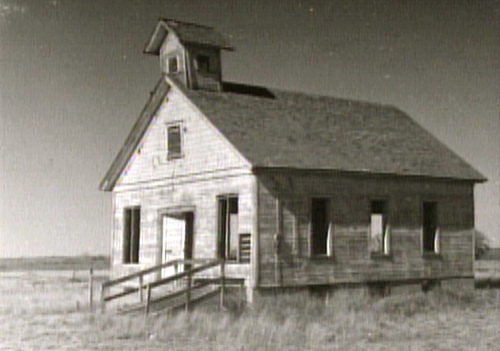
Baptist church in the Black homesteading community of Blackdom Colony, New Mexico, circa 1910

The Great Plains project has shed light on the pattern of colonisation followed by black homesteaders. First of all, like white homesteaders, they were generally poor or very poor and viewed the offer of free land as a way to get ahead, even it meant living in harsh climates with rudimentary housing and clearing land in difficult conditions. About 30 percent of them acquired parcels on federal lands as individuals, separate from other African Americans. In contrast, approximately 70 percent banded together with other blacks to form black townships (called ‘colonies’). Their shared memories of the slave period and of racism in the Southern states that most came from gave them a common vision of what their communities should strive to be.

Their towns or ‘colonies’ tended to be spread out, similar in style to many U.S. farming communities. Homesteaders lived on their homesteads, while tiny towns or settlements provided local services in schools, post offices, churches and stores.

In order to obtain more accurate estimates of black homesteading populations, researchers have cross referenced land patents with other sources of information (e.g. from the census) in 8 Great Plains states and Oklahoma. In these states, 3,400 black claimants won title to land covering nearly 650,000 acres. The black homesteaders in these nine states had a population of 14,600 people who have left between 100,000 and 250,000 living descendants.

== Townships ==
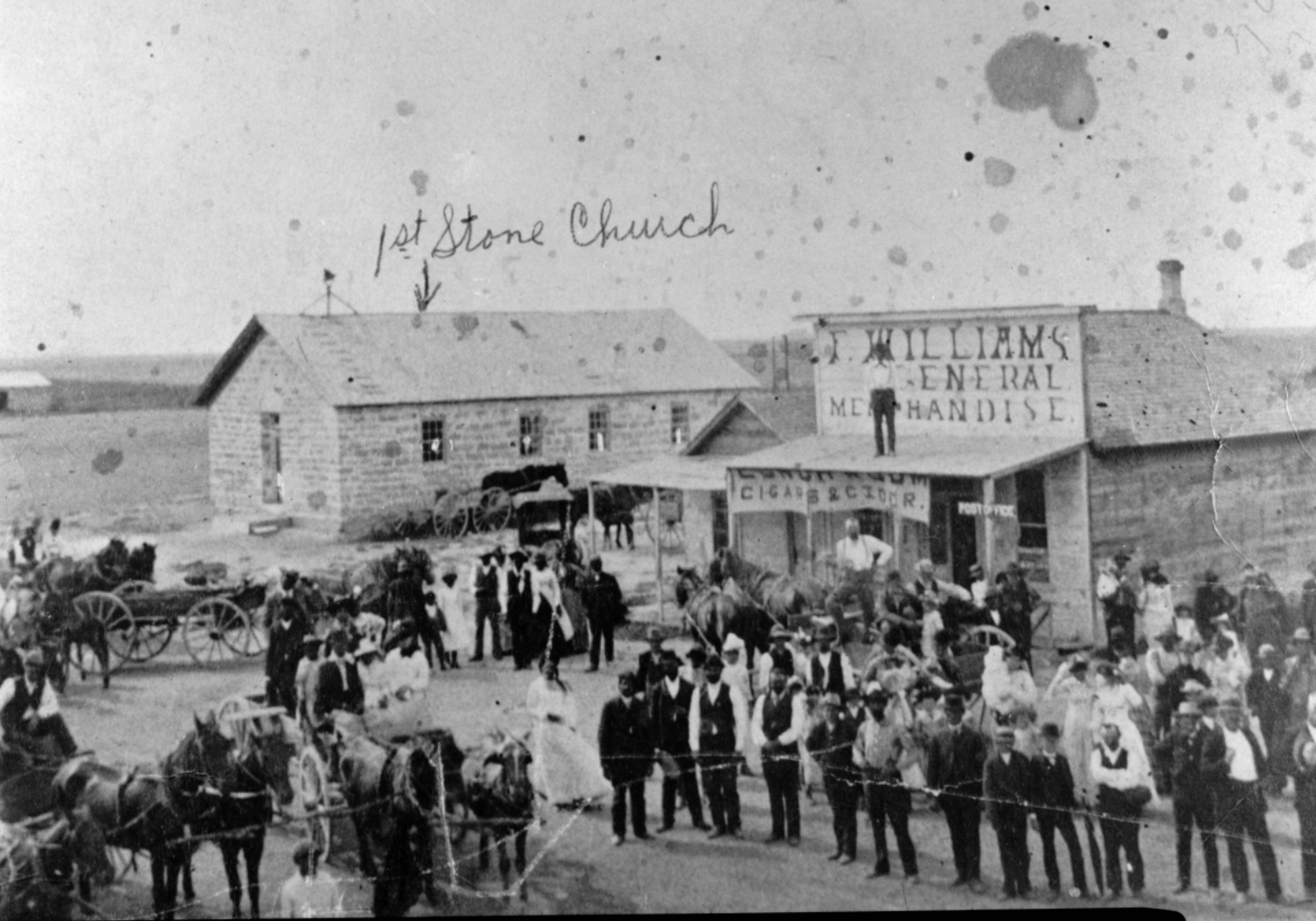
Nicodemus homesteaders in front of their stone church and general store

Some of the townships developed as informal associations of people (often originating from the same region). Others started as for profit corporations whose shareholders gained title to the land and then hoped to recruit homesteaders. The recruiting advertisement for one such project said: "To farmers wanting homes there are 30,000 acres of fine, choice Government Land in the Great Solomon Valley subject to entry. Come and go to the Solomon Valley with us and plow deep, while the sluggards sleep.” In practice, there was little profit to be earned from organising these townships and investor interest soon waned. Numerous townships were founded by black homesteaders, sometimes in partnership with white entrepreneurs.

=== Nicodemus, Kansas ===
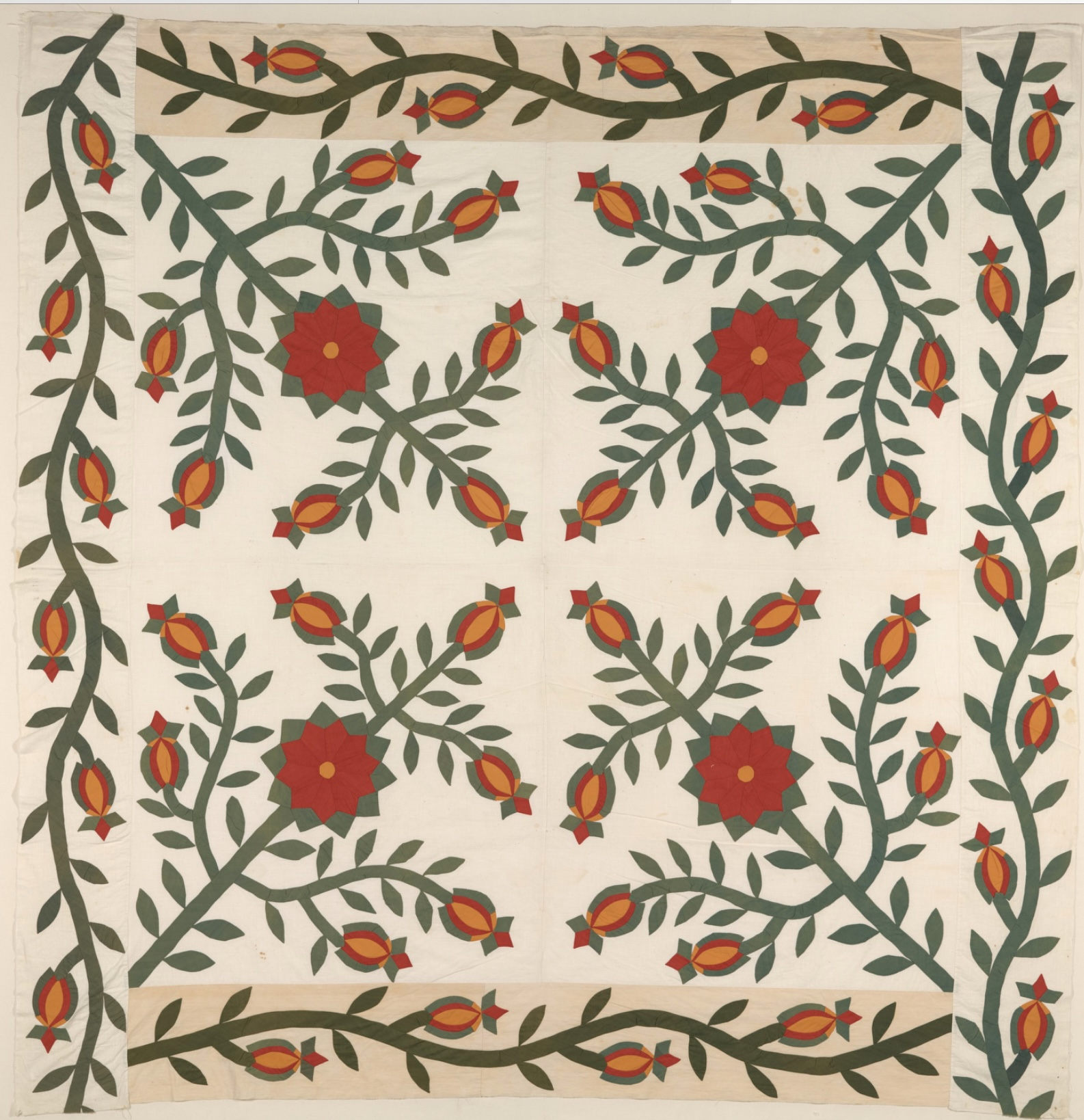
Late 19th century appliqué quilt (a variant of the Love Apple pattern) from Nicodemus, Kansas

Nicodemus, Kansas began as what would now be called a real estate development. Six black entrepreneurs and a white developer founded the Nicodemus Development Corporation. They then recruited groups of homesteaders from Scott and Fayette Counties, Kentucky, followed by other recruits from both Kentucky and Mississippi. The homesteaders migrated together, but about half of the initial recruits returned to their home states after visiting the bleak site in the Solomon River Valley. Nevertheless, 300 to 400 settlers stayed and developed their farms and the community during the 1880s. Today, only about a dozen residents remain. Nicodemus is now a national historic site.

=== DeWitty, Nebraska ===
The black community of DeWitty was founded in 1904 on land made available in the Nebraska Sandhills under the Kincaid Act of 1904. The quality of the farm land in this region was poor. DeWitty eventually grew to be the most populous colony of black homesteaders in Nebraska. By 1929, DeWitty residents had claimed as homesteads a total of 29,402 acres. The total number of black people who at some point lived in DeWitty was between 150 and 175. DeWitty reached its population peak of about 150 residents in 1915. Like many other farming communities, it declined in the farming crisis of the 1920s and disappeared entirely during the Great Depression in the 1930s.

=== Dearfield, Colorado ===
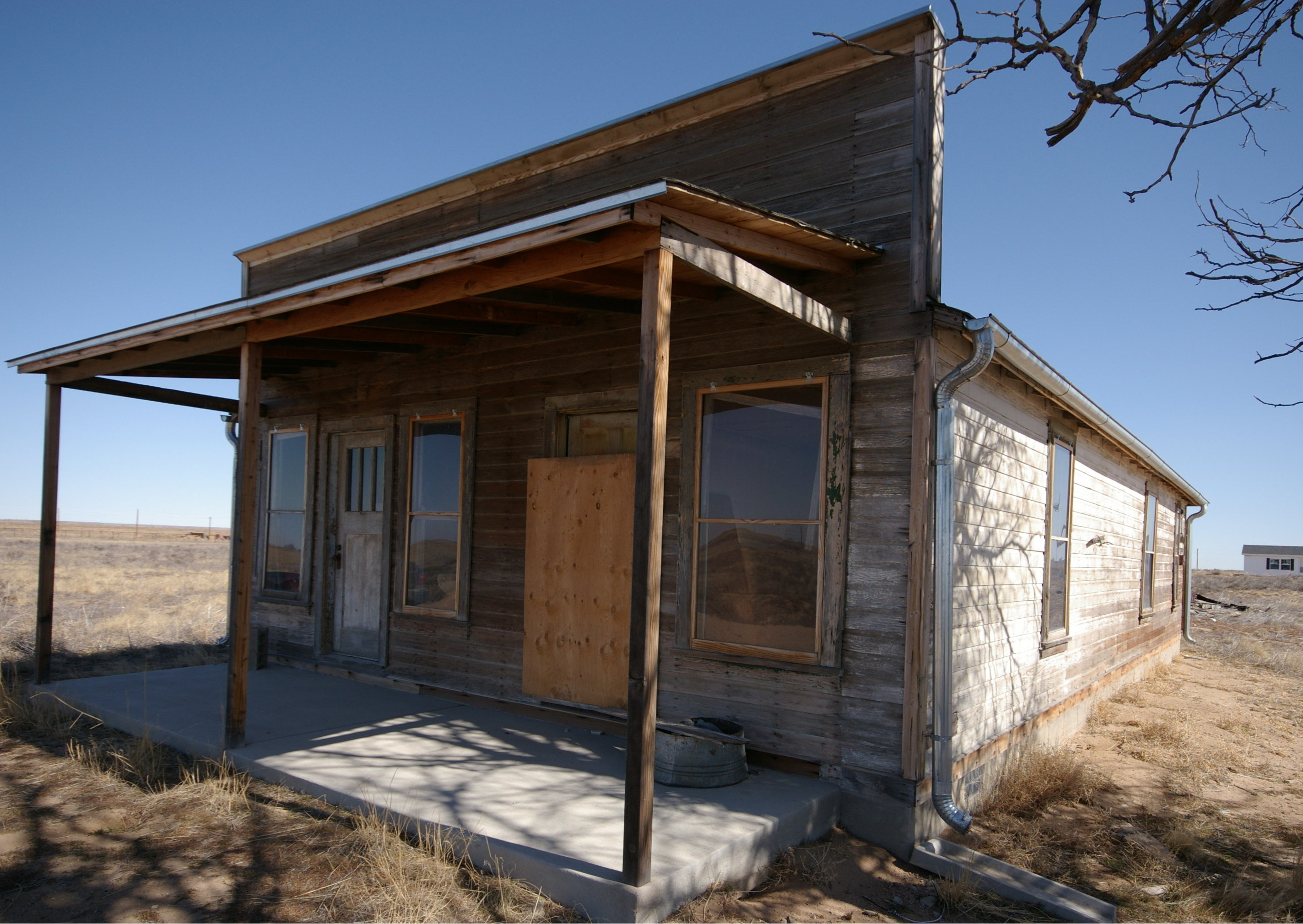
One of the few remaining buildings in Dearfield, Colorado, a black homesteaders’ colony.

Dearfield, Colorado was a black homestead colony in Weld county on the short grass prairie near the South Platte river. Oliver T. Jackson established the Negro Townsite and Land Company and founded the farming community in 1910. Nineteen settlers arrived in 1911, and their first winter was extremely difficult. In the words of one of the homesteaders, that first winter was extremely difficult: "only two of had wooden houses and the suffering was intense. We had scarcely any wood to burn. Buffalo chips and sage brush was our chief fuel." By 1915, the homesteaders had built 44 wooden cabins and had put up over 100 miles of fence. Additional settlers arrived, boosting the population to 111. In spite of the obstacles, by 1919 residents had received patents on thirty-seven homestead claims, covering 6,720 acres. The town was abandoned during the agriculture crisis of the 1920s. Deerfield is now a U.S. Historic Place.

=== Blackdom, New Mexico ===
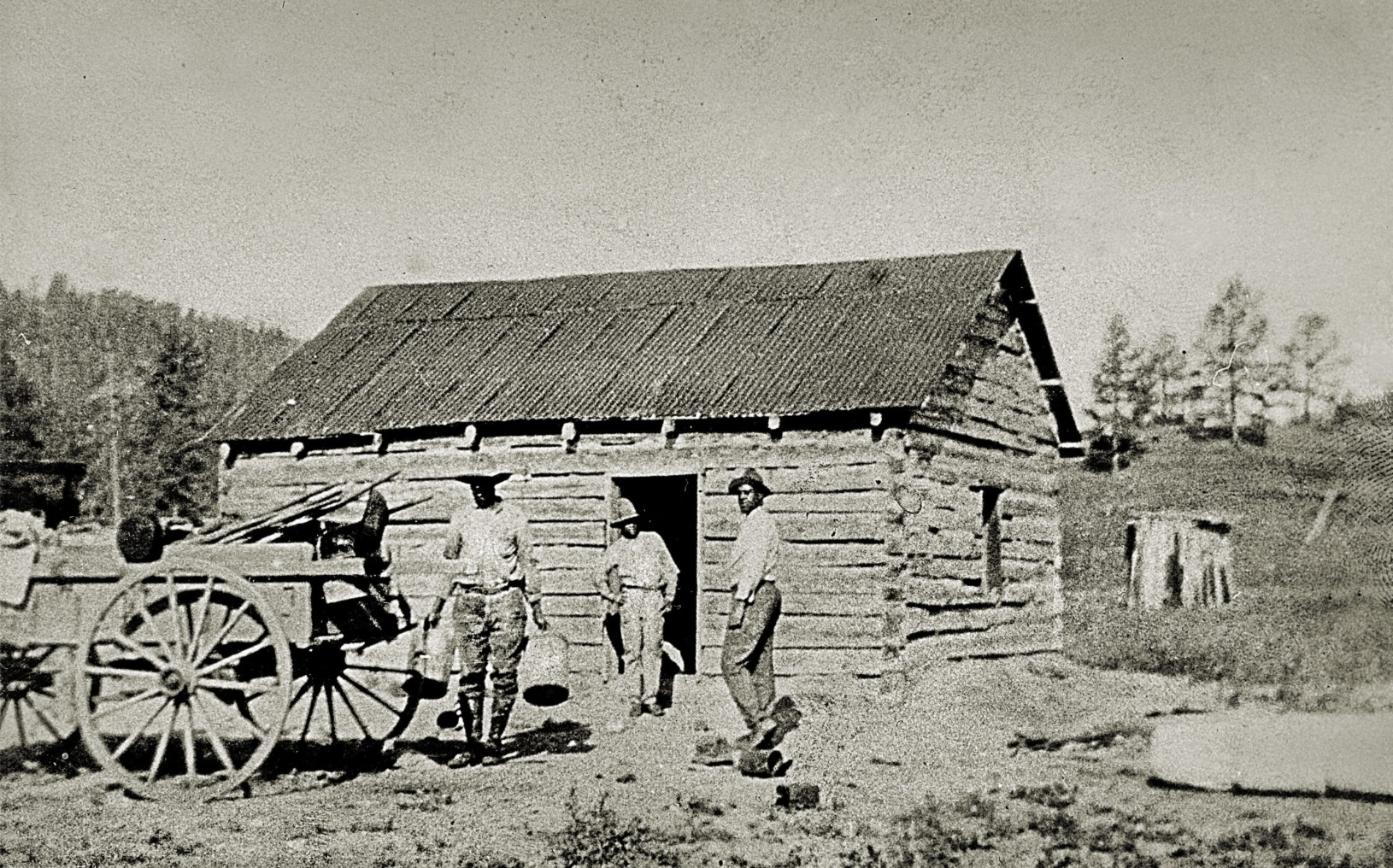
Men working on the Spaulding homestead in Clayton, New Mexico, in the vicinity of the Blackdom Colony.

Blackdom Colony was founded by 13 black homesteaders when they formed the Blackdom Townsite Company, roughly in 1909. Their idea was to found a black colony in the vicinity of Roswell, New Mexico. The region was arid, with low and irregular annual rainfall, though the thinking was that well-fed irrigation systems could be developed. Nevertheless, water availability was a prime source of risk for this agricultural economy.

For a while, Blackdom prospered; it was home to some 49 claim-holders who owned a total of 9,625 acres. A village with commerce, a post office, a church and a school emerged. But success was not durable: with the collapse of agricultural prices after World War I, the town suffered a reversal of fortune and it began to lose population in the early 1920s. Nevertheless, for the homsteaders who retained their property rights, there was a silver lining. Oil was discovered in the Roswell Basin and the remaining homesteaders were able to profit from this.

== Farm crisis and the end of homesteading ==
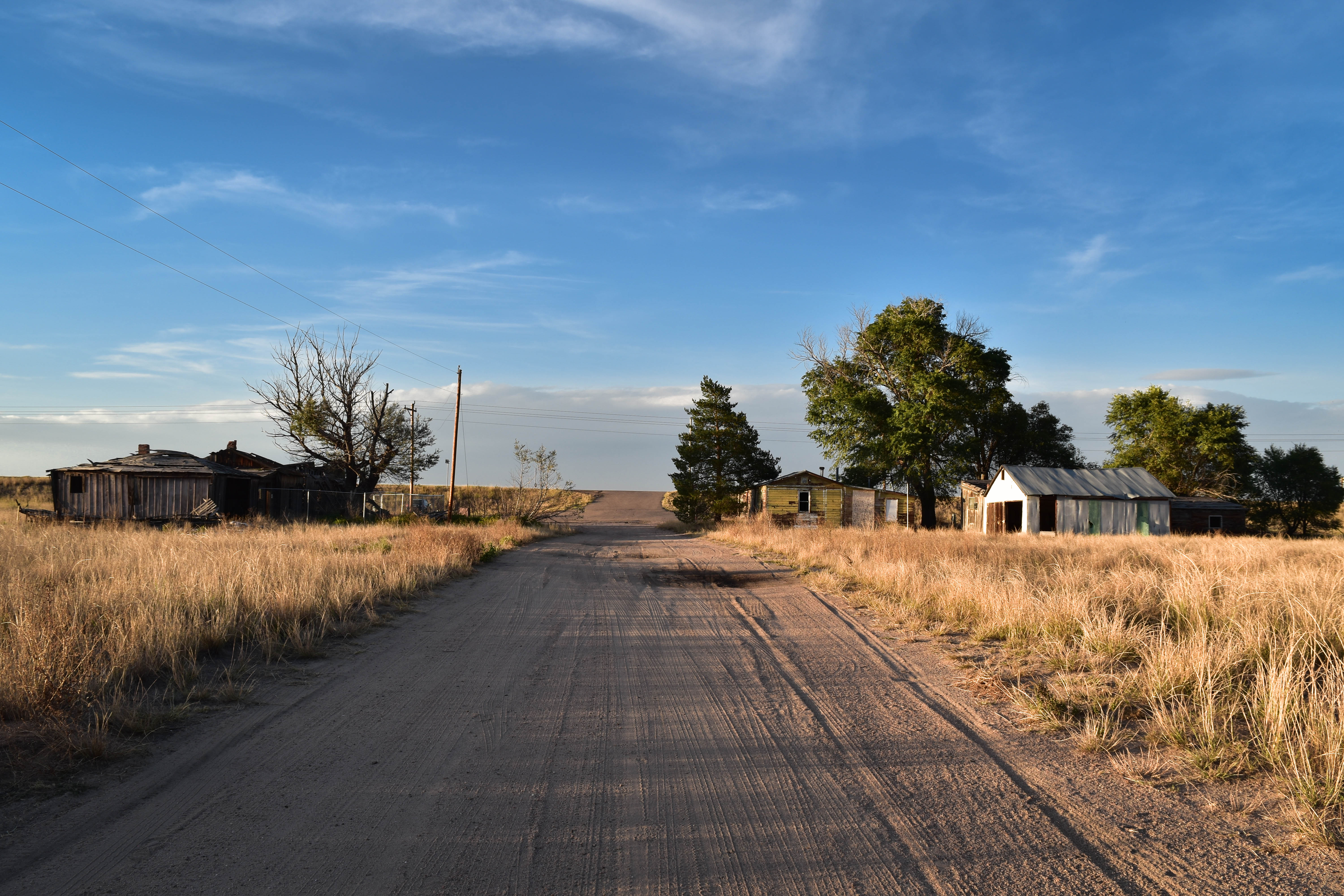
Dearfield, Colorado, a town founded by black homesteaders. The town is now abandoned, but has been declared a U.S. Historic Place.

Like the homesteaders of other socioeconomic groups, black homesteaders struggled to farm successfully in the harsh and drought-prone landscape of the American west. Their efforts took place in the context of a broad rural-urban migration and of farmers' abandonment of farming. The farm population began falling as a proportion of the U.S. population throughout the latter half of the nineteenth century. This decline accelerated after 1900, falling from 42 percent of the U.S. population in 1900 to only 30 percent in 1920. The farm crisis of the 1920s caused many farmers to go bankrupt or to simply abandon farming. Thus, it accentuated a longer-term trend, forcing difficult choices on many farmers, including many black homesteaders.

Although many black homesteaders managed to survive on their land, most followed the broader, long-term trend of exiting agriculture. Ultimately, large scale homesteading ended because people did not find it to be in their economic interests. Furthermore, at some point, the Federal government decided that it would retain control of public lands. The Federal Land Policy and Management Act of 1976 ended homesteading in all states except Alaska (where homesteading was possible until 1986).

== Influential black homesteaders ==
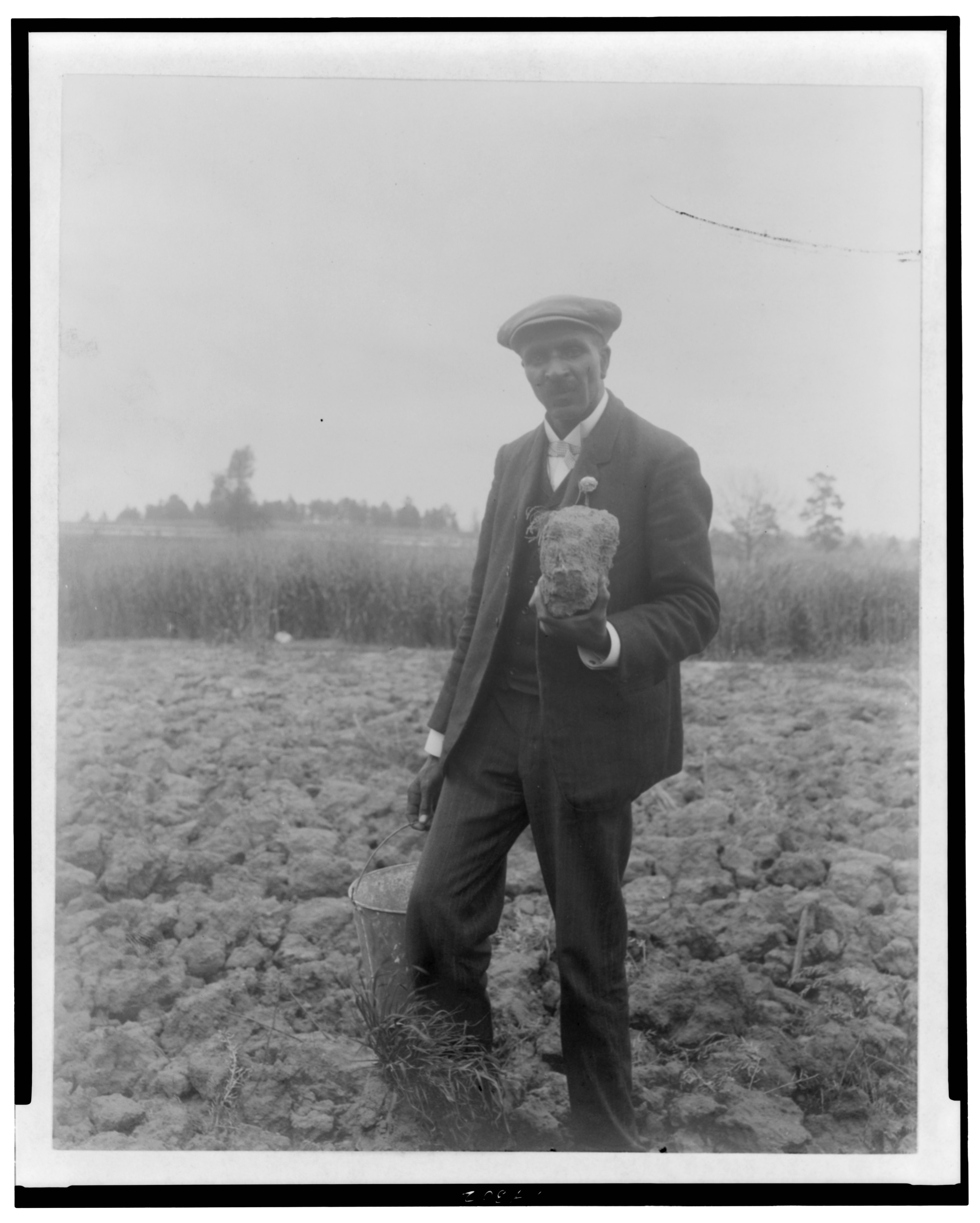
George Washington Carver

The black homesteaders movement included a number of influential people, including:

- Oscar Micheaux, who later became a novelist and the first recognized African American film-maker;
- George Washington Carver, whose long scientific career and many discoveries while at the Tuskegee Institute are celebrated.
