= Rod A. Wing =

American plant geneticist

- Born: January 30, 1957 (age 69); Denver, Colorado, U.S.
- Education: University of California, Berkeley; University of California, Davis
- Occupation: Plant geneticist

Rod A. Wing (born January 30, 1957) is an American plant geneticist. He is the Bud Antle Endowed Chair Professor in the department of plant science at the University of Arizona.
