= Jess E. DuBois =

American artist (1934–2022)

Jess Eugene DuBois (July 6, 1934 – December 28, 2022) was an American artist.

== Biography ==
DuBois was born on July 6, 1934, in Denver, Colorado. He graduated from the inaugural class of The Art Institute of Colorado in 1957. DuBois then traveled the country to study with several established artists including Ray Vanilla, David Lafel, and Daniel Greene. As a Creole of Cherokee ancestry, Dubois was passionate about Indian art. He showcased it in his successful DuBois Gallery in Estes Park, Colorado until he was forced to close following the town's devastating 1982 flood. He subsequently returned to his native Five Points neighborhood in Denver, Colorado, where he cultivated the arts of glassblowing and sculpture, combining those skills with his existing media.

DuBois received The Lifetime Achievement Award at the 1988 Denver Black Arts Festival, where he was lauded for his ability to "Project the soul of his subjects onto canvas.”

The Denver-area Regional Transportation District commissioned him to cast a bronze statue of Denver's first African-American doctor, obstetrician Dr. Justina Ford, which was dedicated in 1998. It can be viewed at the 30th & Downing Light Rail Station in Denver.

DuBois was one of three artists who received the Denver Mayor's Awards for Excellence in the Arts in 2004. He was inducted into the Art Institute of Colorado Hall of Fame that same year.

He was also recognized by the City and County of Denver as a Five Points Jazz Festival honoree in 2019.

DuBois taught children's art in a number of local settings, continued to take art classes himself, and said his goal in life was “to get better and better.”

DuBois died on December 28, 2022, at the age of 88.
