= Bryan Leach =

American entrepreneur and lawyer

- Born: Nairobi, Kenya
- Education: Harvard University (BA); Magdalen College, Oxford (MPhil); Yale University (JD)
- Occupations: Entrepreneur and lawyer
- Known for: Founder and CEO of Ibotta

Bryan Leach is an American entrepreneur and former lawyer. He is the founder and CEO of Ibotta.

== Early life and education ==
Leach was born in Nairobi, Kenya. The family migrated to the U.S. and after his father graduated from Harvard Business School, they moved to Atlanta, Georgia. Leach went on to attend Harvard University, Oxford University as a Marshall Scholar, and Yale Law School.

== Career ==
=== Legal work ===
In 2006, after graduating from Yale Law School, Leach spent a year serving as a law clerk for Justice David Souter at the U.S. Supreme Court.

Leach was a partner at the Bartlit Beck Herman Palenchar & Scott law firm. While at Bartlit Beck, Leach conceived the idea for Ibotta when he was on a flight and saw someone using a phone to take photos of business cards and receipts in order to submit expenses.

=== Ibotta ===
Leach founded Ibotta in 2011, and has since served as its chief executive officer. Ibotta is a technology company that provides cash back rewards to consumers on qualifying purchases through its network of publisher partners and along with its direct-to-consumer properties.

Under Leach's leadership, Ibotta reached a $1 billion valuation in 2019 after its Series D funding. Ibotta became a publicly traded company in April 2024 with a listing on the New York Stock Exchange, becoming the largest tech IPO in Colorado history. The company partners with retailers such as Walmart, Dollar General and Coca-Cola.

In June 2015, Leach received the Entrepreneur of the Year award for the Mountain-Desert region from Ernst & Young. In June 2018, Leach was recognized as a Top 10 CEO in the US for small and medium-sized businesses by Glassdoor.com.

=== Community involvement ===
Leach served as a member of the Board of Trustees of Colorado Academy and KIPP Colorado.

In 2019, Leach and his wife made a gift to the Colorado Academy for a new Center for Performing Arts. The Leach Center for Performing Arts replaced the former Froelicher Theatre, which was constructed in 1976. This new theatre opened in August 2021 and was the fourth and final building of the See it Through capital campaign. Leach's gift also helped create a speech and debate program at Colorado Academy.
