= Ibotta =

American mobile technology company

Ibotta, Inc.
- Type: Public
- Traded as: NYSE: IBTA
- Industry: Technology, performance marketing, CPG campaign measurement, promotions, mobile applications
- Founded: 2011; 15 years ago
- Founder: Bryan Leach
- Headquarters: 1400 16th Street, Denver, Colorado, U.S.
- Area served: United States
- Key people: Bryan Leach (CEO); Luke Swanson (CTO); David Shapiro (CLO); Matt Puckett (CFO); Chris Riedy (CRO); Amir El Tabib (CBDO); Marisa Daspit (CPO)
- Services: Direct marketing
- Revenue: ▼US$342 million (2025)
- Net income: ▼US$3.58 million (2025)
- Number of employees: 815 (2023)
- Website: ibotta.com

Ibotta, Inc. is an American mobile technology company headquartered in Denver, Colorado. Founded in 2011, the company offers cash back rewards on various purchases through its Ibotta Performance Network and direct to consumer app. Ibotta partners with CPG (consumer packaged goods) brands and network publishers to provide these rewards. As of 2024, the company operates solely in the United States. The company's rewards-as-a-service offering, the Ibotta Performance Network, went live in 2022.

In August 2019, Ibotta received a $1 billion valuation after its Series D funding, and in 2023, the company surpassed $1.5 billion cash rewards paid to over 50 million consumers since the company's founding. Ibotta became a publicly traded company in April 2024 with a listing on the New York Stock Exchange. As of September 2025, Ibotta is trading at approximately $27.13 per share, marking a 69% decline from its initial public offering price of $88 per share on April 18, 2024.

== History ==
=== Founding through early 2019 ===
Ibotta was founded by current CEO Bryan Leach. The company was incorporated in 2011 and the app launched to both the App Store and Google Play stores in 2012. Early investors included entrepreneur and computer scientist Jim Clark and Tom “TJ” Jermoluk, Chairman of @Home Network.

In 2015, Ibotta expanded beyond item level grocery, adding the ability to get cash back on in-store retail purchases. In 2016, in-app mobile commerce began, allowing users to navigate from the Ibotta app to its partners' apps to earn cash back on purchases.

In 2016 with a Series C investment, Ibotta had raised over $73 million in funding. In March of that year, Ibotta partnered with Anheuser-Busch to offer cash back for adults who purchased its products. In May, the company partnered with LiveRamp so that companies could use their CRM data to create segmented, personalized campaigns. At the time, the company had around 200 full- and part-time employees and moved from offices in Lower Downtown Denver (LoDo) to a 40,000-square-foot office in the central Denver business district. A year later, the company had to expand to a second floor as it added almost another 100 employees.

In 2017, Ibotta added cash back for Uber to its app as well as cash back rewards for online and mobile purchases.

In 2018, Ibotta was listed on the Inc. 5,000 list as one of the fastest growing private companies in the U.S. A year later, in January 2019, the Ibotta app had been downloaded more than 30 million times with users receiving a reported $500 million in cash back rewards. That year, Ibotta was the largest mobile company in Colorado with six million monthly active users.

=== August 2019 to present ===
In August 2019, Ibotta was valued at $1 billion, following a Series D round of funding. The round was led by Koch Disruptive Technologies, a subsidiary of Koch Industries.

2019 was also the year the company introduced Pay with Ibotta, which allowed users to complete purchases at key retailers on the Ibotta app and earn instant cash back in the process. With that new service, users were able to enter their purchase total and use a QR code to checkout and receive immediate cash back.

In 2020, the company partnered with Trees for the Future to plant up to 1 million trees as part of an Earth Month campaign to raise awareness about the waste of unused paper coupons. In response to the COVID-19 pandemic, Ibotta partnered with CPG brands in their “Here to Help” campaign and together committed over $10 million in cash back to American consumers. The company added the ability to earn cash back from online grocery pick-up and delivery orders.

Later that year, Ibotta started its free Thanksgiving program, providing users with 100% cash back on select groceries needed for a Thanksgiving meal. By 2022, the company had provided approximately 10 million Thanksgiving meals.

In 2021, Ibotta acquired the company OctoShop (originally InStok), a shopping browser extension company. The OctoShop app enables users to compare prices across stores and set restock and price-drop alerts.

In April 2022, the Ibotta Performance Network (IPN) was launched. The IPN allows brands to deliver digital offers to consumers through third party publishers. Retailers including Walmart, Dollar General and Family Dollar, food delivery services including Instacart, and convenience stores including Shell are all part of the Ibotta Performance Network. This pay-per-sales or success-based performance network reaches over 200 million consumers.

On April 18, 2024, Ibotta had its initial public offering (IPO), trading on the New York Stock Exchange (NYSE) under the ticker symbol IBTA. It was the largest technology IPO in Colorado history.

In October 2025, Ibotta announced a partnership with technology and analytics company Circana, integrating Circana's Household Lift measurement into Ibotta campaigns to give CPG brands an increased understanding of the impact of their promotional campaigns. On November 3, 2025, Ibotta launched LiveLift, a tool for companies to measure the return on investment of digital promotions, in order to optimize performance marketing goals.

=== Athletic partnerships ===
Ibotta became the official jersey patch partner of the New Orleans Pelicans, a professional men's basketball team in the National Basketball Association (NBA), for the 2020–2021 and 2023–2024 seasons.

Ibotta became the official jersey patch partner of the 2023 NBA champion Denver Nuggets basketball team beginning in the 2023–2024 season.

In March 2023, F1 driver Logan Sargeant, the first U.S. racer to compete in F1 since 2015, partnered with Ibotta. The Ibotta logo was displayed on Sargeant's racing helmet throughout his F1 career.

In June 2023, UConn Huskies women's basketball player Paige Bueckers entered into a "name, image, and likeness" (NIL) promotional agreement with Ibotta. According to a press release by Ibotta, the company has agreements with The Brandr Group, which finds NIL opportunities for women college athletes, and the Pearpop social media marketing platform to promote Ibotta.

== Legal issues ==
In April 2025, shareholders filed a class action lawsuit—Fortune v. Ibotta, Inc., in the U.S. District Court for the District of Colorado (Case No. 25-cv-01213)—alleging that the registration statement in connection with Ibotta’s April 2024 initial public offering omitted material information. The complaint claims that, although Ibotta disclosed detailed terms for its contract with Walmart Inc., it failed to warn investors that its agreement with The Kroger Co., its second-largest client, was terminable at will and thus could be canceled without warning, creating a misleading impression of stability.
