= Robert N. Cavarra =

American composer, organist, harpsichordist, pianist and musicologist

- Born: February 23, 1934; Denver, Colorado, U.S.
- Died: February 8, 2008 (aged 73); Denver, Colorado, U.S.
- Education: University of Colorado Boulder
- Employer: Colorado State University
- Spouse: Barbara Cavarra
- Children: 3 sons (Robert Christopher; Stephan Gian, Matthew Nicholas), 1 daughter (Karla Marie (Cavarra) Britton)

Robert N. Cavarra (February 23, 1934 - February 8, 2008) was an American composer, organist, harpsichordist, pianist and musicologist who taught at Colorado State University from 1963 to 2000. According to the Denver Post, he was "a leading participant in the revival of the classical organ tradition in North America."
