= Sallie M. Mills Johnson =

American author (born 1862)

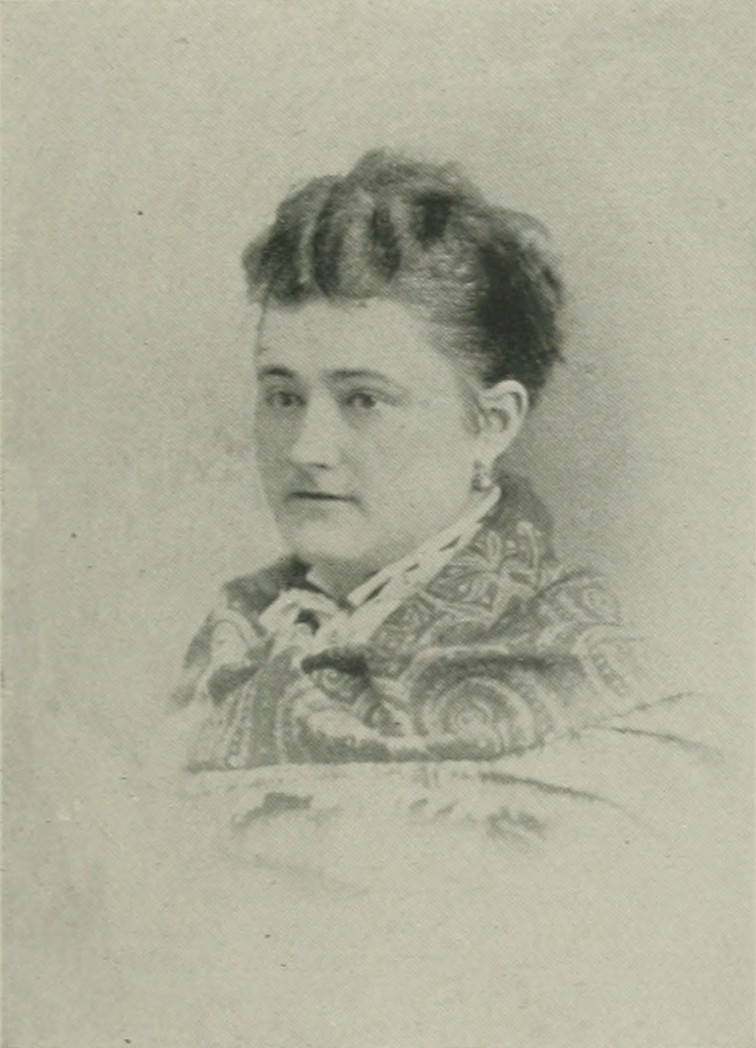
Sallie M. Mills Johnson, A woman of the century

Sallie M. Mills Johnson (born March 6, 1862) was an American writer.

== Biography ==
Sallie M. Mills was born in Sandusky, Ohio, on March 6, 1862. She was a granddaughter of Judge Isaac Mills, of New Haven, Connecticut. Her father was Gen. William H. Mills, of Sandusky.

She was educated in New York City.

Johnson was widely known as the author of Palm Branches, and numerous other books. Her compositions in verse were of a fine order.

She traveled much in the United States and in Europe.

She was a skilled musician, and, while studying in Weimar, received a signal compliment from Franz Liszt.

Sallie M. Mills married C. C. Johnson.

She moved to Denver, Colorado, where she owned much valuable real estate.
