= August Skamenca =

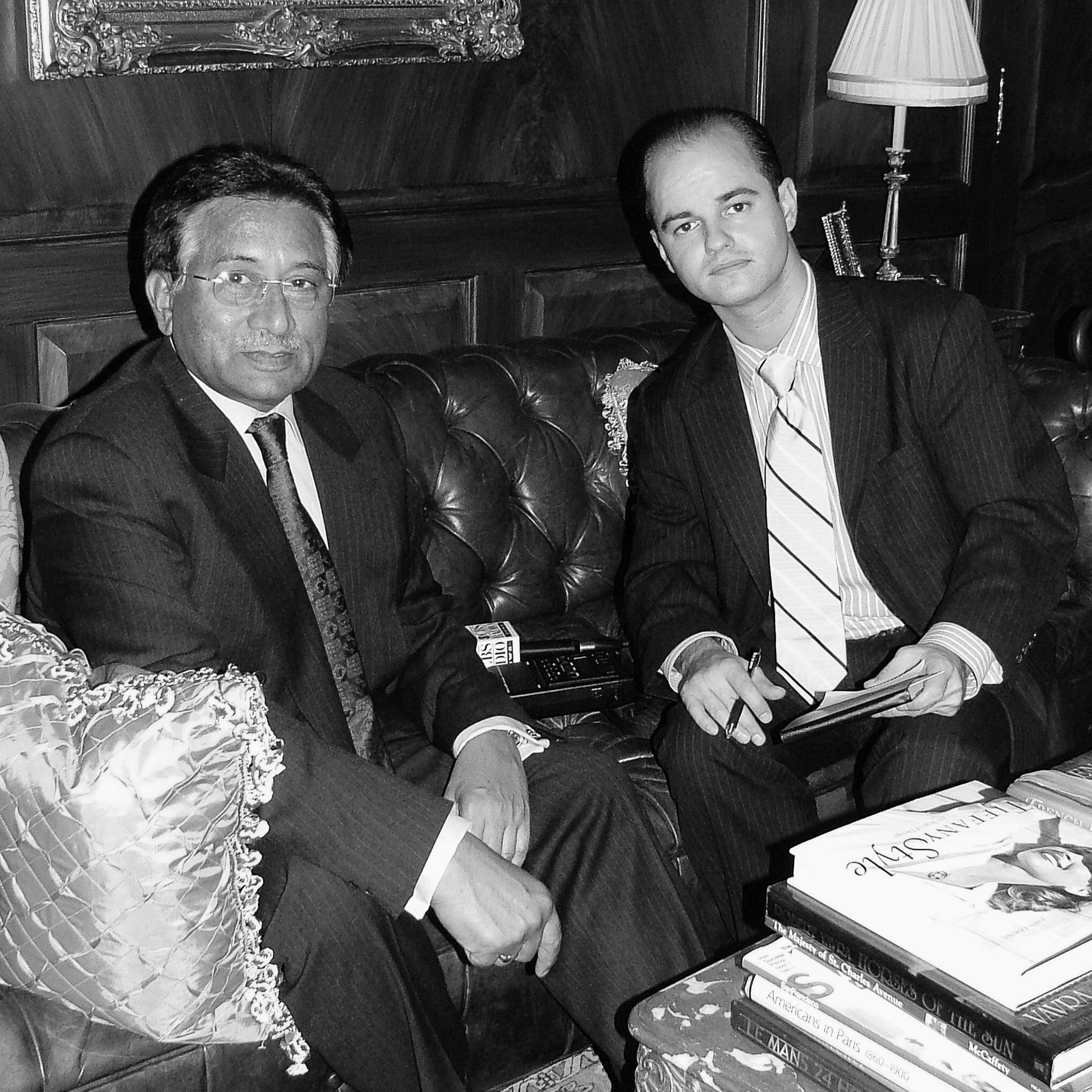
- August Skamenca in an interview with former President of Pakistan Pervez Musharraf
- Born: August Skamenca
- Education: University of Missouri
- Occupation: Journalist
- Years active: 1993–present

August Skamenca (born 1981) is an American radio correspondent and entrepreneur based in Houston, Texas, covering the Gulf Coast and Central United States for CBS News.

== CBS News ==
Since joining CBS News in June 2008, Skamenca has covered hurricanes in the South, wildfires in the West, drought in the nation’s heartland and blizzards on the East Coast. His assignments have put him on the front lines of the 2016, 2012 and 2008 presidential campaigns, the Mexican drug war, the shores of the Gulf of Mexico slickened by the 2010 BP oil spill, the aftermath of the 2009 Fort Hood shooting attack and subsequent trial of Nidal Hasan, as well as the 2014 Fort Hood shootings. He has also reported on such major events as the 2015 American Sniper trial, the 2014 Ebola virus outbreak, the 2013 West Fertilizer Company explosion in Texas, and the 2012 Aurora, Colorado shooting.

== Early life ==
At age 12, Skamenca began pursuing a career in print journalism by convincing an editor to let him intern at the Colorado Springs Independent in 1993. Later stops in print included the Intermountain Jewish News and Denver Post. In 1996, at age 14, Skamenca made his broadcast debut on a children’s radio station with an appropriate set of call letters: K-KYD. Skamenca received his first major assignment when a federal judge moved the trials of Oklahoma City bombing conspirators Timothy McVeigh and Terry Nichols to Denver. Skamenca worked the courtroom and the halls of the Denver federal courthouse along with seasoned journalists.

On April 21, 1999, Skamenca was one of the first reporters on the scene as Columbine High School was besieged by two students armed with guns and pipe bombs. He would go on to cover the Jon Benet Ramsey and Matthew Shepard cases, the surrender and capture of the prison escapees dubbed The Texas Seven as well as the Four Corners manhunt.

== Recognition ==
Skamenca is the recipient of several national Edward R. Murrow awards., a Unity Award for Minority Affairs Coverage and awards from the Society of Professional Journalists. His work has also been honored by Investigative Reporters and Editors IRE, the Texas Associated Press Broadcasters and the Kansas City Press Club.
