= Deatt Hudson =

American poet

Deatt Hudson (1931-1988) was an American educator and writer. She taught English in schools and colleges in Colorado. Her poetry and short stories were published in The New Yorker and other leading magazines.

== Early life and education ==
Deatt Hudson was born June 20, 1931, at Presbyterian Hospital in Denver, Colorado, to Margaret McEwan Hudson and George Fletcher Hudson. The family moved to Georgetown and Longmont before settling in Dolores, Colorado. In an autobiography she wrote as a school assignment, she said that although the bars in town outnumbered the stores 2 to 1, she found the people "good-hearted and friendly". Even at this early age, she wanted to write poetry and short stories, although she admitted that teaching would probably be a better choice if she wanted to eat. Her parents had high expectations for their daughter, and yet allowed her to make her own decisions. She believed that this helped her become self-reliant and taught her to form her own opinions.

Deatt Hudson received her first literary award during her junior year of high school, when she won first place in a Western State College scholarship contest in American literature. Hudson attended Dolores High School and graduated valedictorian in 1948. She was awarded a scholarship to any of the state schools, but opted to earn her B.A. at the University of Denver where she was elected Phi Beta Kappa. She also participated in Ballroom Partners, a dance group. She received an M.A. in American Studies from Yale University in 1954 and another in English from the Breadloaf School of English at Middlebury College in 1967.

== Teaching career ==
Upon receiving her first M.A., Hudson began teaching at North High School in Denver. After some time at North High School, she began teaching English at Colorado Women's College. After retiring from her position, she continued to teach at Emily Griffith Opportunity School where she taught English as a Second Language. Those who knew her all agreed that she was an outstanding teacher, who believed that teaching was the noblest profession.

== Writing career ==
Throughout her life, Hudson wrote poetry and short stories, which were published in The New Yorker, The Nation, Prism International and other periodicals.

== Personal life ==
She loved to travel, and a year-long trip to Peru in 1962-1963 had a great deal of influence on both her writing and teaching styles. Deatt Hudson never married and was an only child, so at the time of her death her friends and her students were her family. Towards the end of her life, Deatt Hudson suffered greatly from asthma, which significantly curtailed her activities. She died of respiratory arrest November 19, 1988, at the age of 57.
