= Milton Schayer =

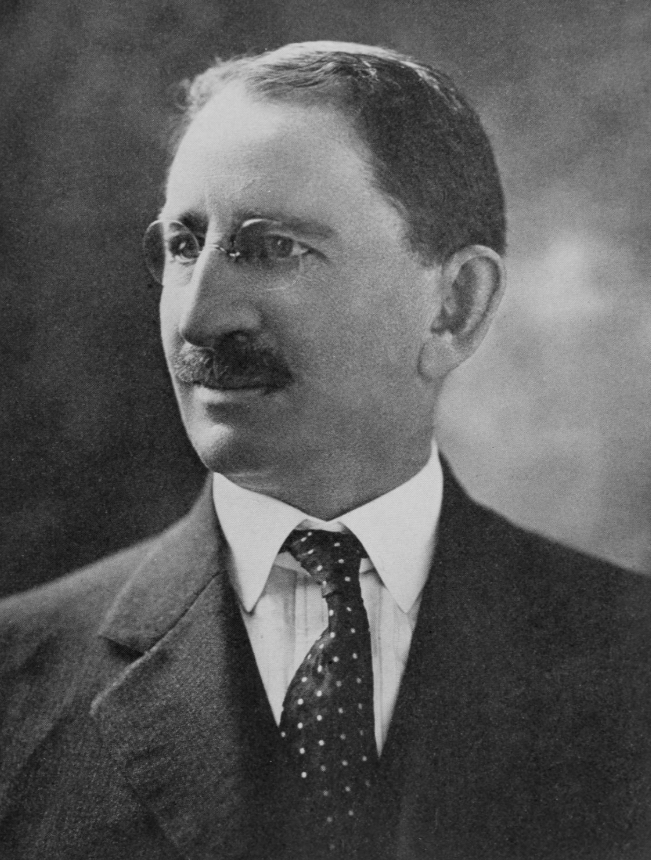
- Born: Milton Mincha Schayer; April 30, 1876; Denver, Colorado, US
- Died: December 11, 1935 (aged 59); Denver, Colorado, US
- Occupation: Businessman
- Spouses: Elsie Reinach (m. 1908; died 1919) Jane S. Bear (m. 1921)

Signature
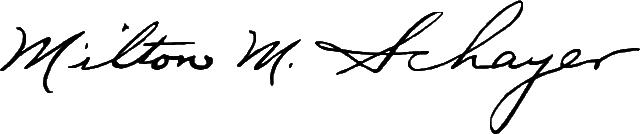

Milton Mincha Schayer (April 30, 1876 – December 11, 1935) was prominent in Denver business circles in the first half of the twentieth century.

== Biography ==
He was born in Denver, Colorado, on April 30, 1876 to German-Jewish parents. When he was ten the family moved to Galveston, Texas, where he began working as an errand boy at the Galveston Fruit Company. He was promoted in the company, but moved back to Denver after the Galveston flood of 1900. In Denver he entered the stock and bond business, and in 1920 founded the Bankers Building and Loan Association, and served as its first president and treasurer.

He was active in many civic and religious organizations. He was director of the Denver Chamber of Commerce, which recognized him as Denver's "most valuable citizen" in 1925. He was a member of Temple Emanuel, president of the Central Jewish Aid Society, and president of the Denver Lodge of the Independent Order of B'nai B'rith. He was a member of the Masons, the Denver Press Club, the Philosophical Society, and the Colorado Bankers Association.

He wrote a weekly syndicated column titled "Things to Think About", which appeared in the Jewish News in the Rocky Mountain Region, and a number of East Coast newspapers. He was also active in a literary group, discussions of which prompted the inquiries he sent to prominent scientists and men of letters.

Schayer was married twice, first to Elsie Reinach on January 8, 1908, who died in 1919, and then to Jane S. Bear on January 11, 1921. He had two children, Helen Elsie and Charles Milton.

He died from a heart attack at his home in Denver on December 11, 1935.
