= Justina Ford =

American physician

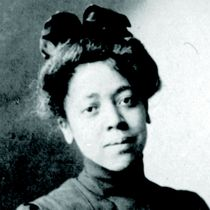
- Born: Justina Laurena Warren; January 22, 1871; Knoxville, Illinois
- Died: October 14, 1952 (aged 81); Denver, Colorado
- Other name: Justina Carter Ford
- Education: Hering Medical College
- Medical career
- Profession: Physician
- Field: Gynecology, obstetrics, pediatrics
- Institutions: Denver General Hospital

Justina Laurena Ford (January 22, 1871 – October 14, 1952) was an American physician. She was the first licensed African American female doctor in Denver, Colorado, and practiced gynecology, obstetrics, and pediatrics from her home for half a century.

== Biography ==
Justina Laurena Warren was born in 1871 in Knoxville, Illinois several years after the Civil War. She was one of many children and often accompanied her mother, a nurse, when she tended to patients. In 1892 she married Baptist minister John Ford and subsequently moved to Chicago, where she graduated from the Hering Medical College in 1899.

Ford worked briefly at an Alabama hospital before relocating to Denver in 1902. There, she was given her medical license, although she was told by her examiner, "I feel dishonest taking a fee from you. You've got two strikes against you to begin with. First of all, you're a lady, and second, you're colored". Since African Americans were barred at the time from working in hospitals or joining the Colorado Medical Association, Ford set up a private practice in her home in Five Points, where she specialized in gynecology, obstetrics, and pediatrics. In 1915, she and her husband divorced; she later married Alfred Allen.

Ford practiced medicine from her home for 50 years, serving a diverse clientele that included "poor whites, African-Americans, and non-English speaking immigrants who were turned away from hospitals". Her patients often exchanged goods and services for consultations, rather than paying in cash. "She strongly believed that if at all possible, children should be delivered at home". She delivered nearly 7,000 babies during her career. She was affectionately called "The Lady Doctor" or "The Baby Doctor" by her patients.

In 1950, Ford was allowed to join the Colorado and American Medical Associations; she also became a member of the Denver Medical Society and began working in the Denver General Hospital. At that time, she was still the only female African American doctor in Denver. Dr. Ford received the Human Rights Award from Denver's Cosmopolitan Club, in 1951. Ford continued to practice medicine until two weeks before her death in 1952.

== Posthumous honors ==
In 1988, Ford's home in Five Points, Denver, was converted into the Black American West Museum and Heritage Center. One room is devoted to an exhibition of her life and work.

Ford was inducted into the Colorado Women's Hall of Fame in 1985 and was named a "Medical Pioneer of Colorado" by the Colorado Medical Society in 1989. In 1998, a sculpture of Ford holding a baby, made by Jess E. DuBois, was erected outside her house.

An elementary school in Littleton, Colorado, has been named in her honor; construction began in 2020.

== See also ==
- History of slavery in Colorado
- List of African American pioneers of Colorado
