= William McGaa =

American mountain man (1824–1867)

William W. McGaa (17 April 1824 – 15 December 1867) was a mountain man and one of the early figures in the history of the Colorado settlement of St. Charles (now called Denver). Born in Scotland, he immigrated to the United States and was living with the Arapaho under the name Jack Jones by the time of the Colorado Gold Rush.

McGaa claimed an upper-class ancestry. He declared he was the son of the Lord Mayor of London and had a family estate in Scotland, Glenarm.

William Larimer worked with McGaa, who camped on the bank of Cherry Creek, to steal the land for the town of St. Charles from the local Native Americans, the official owners of the land as recognized in 1851 by the Fort Laramie Treaty. This was possible because McGaa 'claimed' various native wives as property and therefore represented that he had the authority to make the land transfer.

As a reward to the Native Americans, McGaa supposedly named several Denver streets in their honor. Wazee and Wewatta Streets are named for his wives. Champa is also acknowledged as one of McGaa's Indian names, although its exact etymology is uncertain; one source claims it is the Sioux word for "cherry." McGaa also named Glenarm Street after his alleged family castle and after himself, McGaa Street.

McGaa's contemporaries did not think highly of him. Jerome Smiley wrote, "McGaa had promised more than he could perform, was a troublesome customer to manage, and a hard man to browbeat." In his book Sketches from America, John White wrote he met McGaa one day "in a state approaching sobriety," and, during the ensuing interview McGaa kept throwing "longing looks toward the bar." Eventually, the city street named in his honor was renamed lest McGaa Street damage the town's reputation. It was renamed after McGaa's death to Holladay Street, after stagecoach entrepreneur Ben Holladay. It was later renamed to what is now known today as Market Street.

His son, William Denver McGaa, with wife Jennie Adams is noted as being the first child, both white and Native American, born in Denver, on March 8, 1859.
