= Black American West Museum and Heritage Center =

Museum in Denver, Colorado

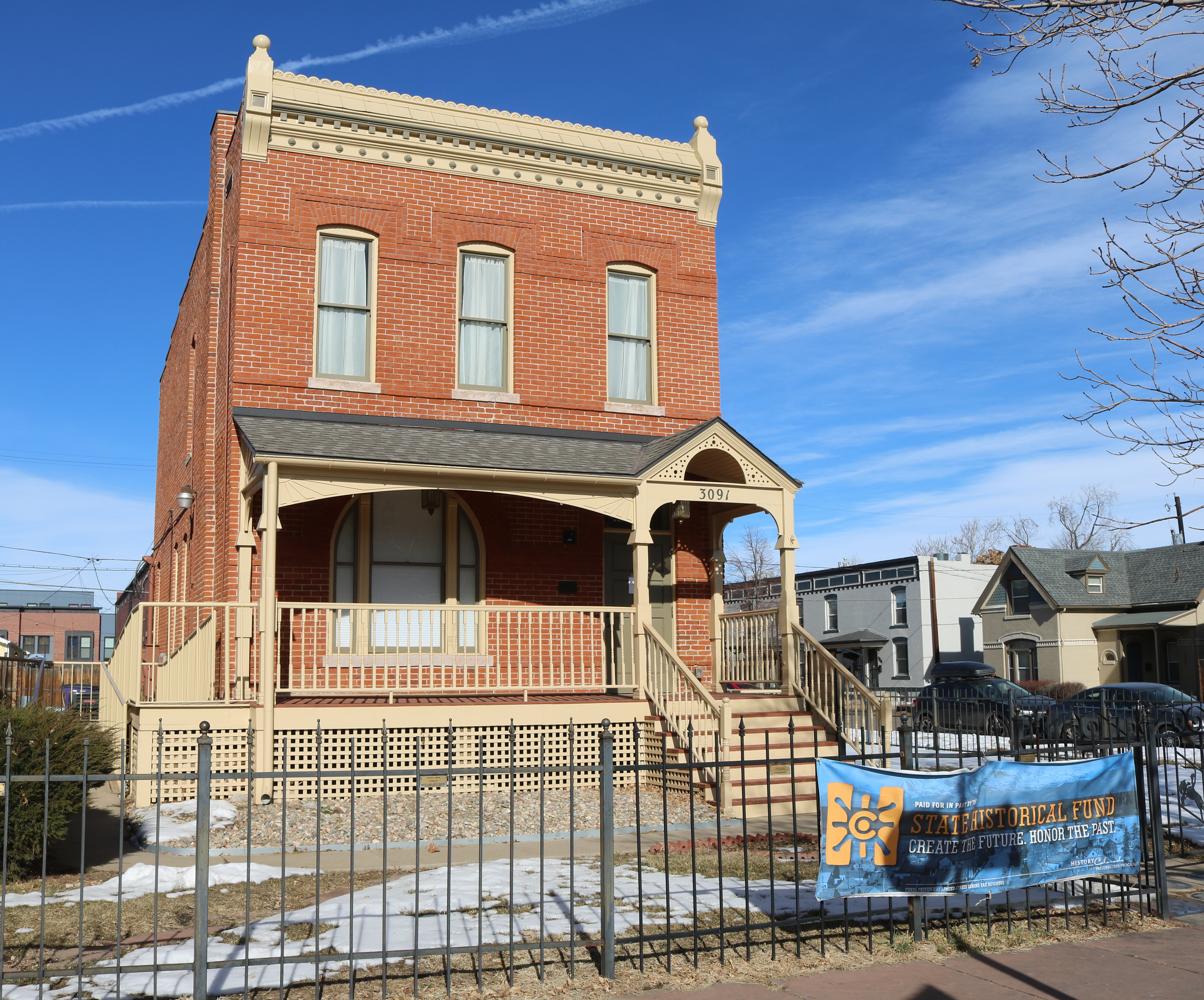
The museum in 2023

The Black American West Museum and Heritage Center, located in Denver, Colorado, is a museum dedicated to telling the story of African American men and women who helped to settle and develop the American West, including Black cowboys. It was founded by Paul Stewart and is located in the former home of Justina Ford, the first licensed African American female doctor in Denver, Colorado.

In 2021, the museum and heritage center received a grant from the National Trust for Historic Preservation's African American Cultural Heritage Action Fund.
