= Larry Edward Penley =

Educator and management scholar

- Born: February 9, 1949 (age 77); Bristol, Virginia, US
- Occupations: Teacher, management scholar and university strategist

Academic background
- Education: BA., Psychology; MA., Communication; PhD., Management
- Alma mater: Wake Forest University; University of Georgia

Larry Edward Penley (born February 9, 1949) is an educator, management scholar and university strategist. He is Regent on the Arizona Board of Regents, serving his second term, which has included two years as chairman and 5 years as part of the Board's leadership team.

Penley was previously President of the Thunderbird School of Global Management, President of Colorado State University, Chancellor of the Colorado State University System, Professor and Dean of the W. P. Carey School of Business at Arizona State University, and Associate Professor and Associate Dean of the College of Business at the University of Texas at San Antonio.

== Early life and education ==
Penley was born in Bristol, Virginia on February 9, 1949. He graduated with a BA in psychology from Wake Forest University in 1971, followed by an MA in 1972, and received a PhD in management from the University of Georgia in 1976.

== Career ==
=== Early career ===
After earning his doctorate, Penley joined the faculty of The University of Texas at San Antonio (UTSA) in August 1975 as an Assistant Professor of Management and was later promoted to Associate Professor and named Associate Dean of the College of Business (1980–1985). As Associate Dean, he initiated an engineering MBA for the engineers of Southwest Research in collaboration with the UTSA Dean of the College of Engineering. Concurrently, he focused on global education, especially in Latin America and Mexico. Following his position as Visiting Lecturer at The Instituto Tecnológico y de Estudios Superiores de Monterrey, he spent 5 months in Venezuela as Visiting Professor at the Postgrado of the Universidad de Carabobo.

=== Mid-career ===
In June 1985, Penley became Professor and Chairman of the Department of Management at Arizona State University (ASU). He was selected as Interim Dean of the ASU College of Business in July, 1990, followed by his selection as Dean in July, 1991. Under his leadership as Dean, the Mexico Economic Outlook consensus forecast was created along with degree programs in Mexico City with the Instituto Autonama de Mexico and Tsinghua University in Beijing. He was named the Robert Herberger Arizona Heritage Chair. As ASU dean, he introduced curriculum changes like a distinctive accounting curriculum, a business honors experience that led to a high proportion of the University's honors graduates coming from the Business School, and he established ASU's tech-MBA for the growing market segment of engineers. The redesign of the Evening MBA program at ASU increased retention and graduation rates and the changes to the ASU Full-time MBA led to students' graduating with much higher salaries. He focused on attracting students from diverse backgrounds, leading to his recognition with the Frank C. Carr Award.

Penley left Arizona State University in 2003 to become the President of Colorado State University (CSU) and Chancellor of the CSU System. He supported Colorado's introduction of the College Opportunity Fund as a means of raising overall college attainment for the state and promoted interdisciplinary research in his Great Global Challenges initiative to tackle challenges like infectious disease and the need for renewable energy. He led the initiative to create CSU Global, (initially called CSU-Colorado), an online university designed as a collaboration with Colorado's community colleges. As CSU President, he accepted the invitation of Prospanica to become the first non-Latino on the board, he recognized Colorado civil rights leaders, John and Edna Mosley with honorary degrees. Throughout his career, he worked to secure funding for endowed faculty positions at both ASU and CSU.

=== Late career ===
Following his resignation from CSU, Penley established a business consulting firm, Penley Consulting. His appointment at Thunderbird School of Global Management as President and Chief Academic Officer came on November 1, 2012 and he worked with other Trustees to resolve Thunderbird's financial problems and to move from an MBA degree to a Master of Global Management (MGM). Following the merger of Thunderbird into Arizona State University on January 1, 2015, Governor Ducey appointed him as Regent of the Arizona Board of Regents in October of 2015. As Chairman of the Arizona Board of Regents, he led policy changes that updated the general education program for undergraduate students of Arizona's three public universities. He developed the New Economy Initiative to enhance Arizona's economic competitiveness through increasing the number of college graduates in select, high-demand fields, and with other Regents he focused on raising each university's distinctiveness and excellence, including their online programs, with university-specific metrics. Additionally, he stressed raising overall state attainment through initiatives such as improving community college-university relationships, introducing new degrees, freezing tuition during COVID, reducing tuition for DACA students, enhancing affordability through financial aid, launching the Arizona Promise Program for lower-income students, and refocusing Northern Arizona University on its expansion to non-traditional, underserved populations in the appointment of President Jose Luis Cruz Rivera.

== Awards and honors ==
- 1997 – Frank C. Carr Founders Award, INROADS Arizona
- 2002 – Distinguished Service Award, Greater Phoenix Economic Council
- 2006 – NCEDC Economic Development Excellence Award
- 2006 – Citizen of the Year, Fort Collins Board of Realty
- 2007 – Chair's Award for Renewable Energy Collaboratory, Denver Economic Development Corporation

== Bibliography ==
=== Books ===
- Human resources simulation using Lotus 1-2-3 (1988) ISBN 9780538078320
- Elite MBA Programs at Public Universities: How a Dozen Innovative Schools Are Redefining Business Education (2004) ISBN 9780275978112

=== Selected articles ===
- Gould, S., & Penley, L. E. (1984). Career strategies and salary progression: A study of their relationships in a municipal bureaucracy. Organizational Behavior and Human Performance, 34(2), 244–265.
- Gould, S., & Penley, L. E. (1985). A study of the correlates of the willingness to relocate. Academy of Management Journal, 28(2), 472–478.
- Penley, L. E., & Hawkins, B. (1985). Studying interpersonal communication in organizations: A leadership application. Academy of Management Journal, 28(2), 309–326.
- Penley, L. E., & Gould, S. (1988). Etzioni's model of organizational involvement: A perspective for understanding commitment to organizations. Journal of organizational Behavior, 9(1), 43–59.
- Penley, L. E., Alexander, E. R., Jernigan, I. E., & Henwood, C. I. (1991). Communication abilities of managers: The relationship to performance. Journal of management, 17(1), 57–76.
- Alexander III, E. R., Penley, L. E., & Jernigan, I. E. (1992). The relationship of basic decoding skills to managerial effectiveness. Management Communication Quarterly, 6(1), 58–73.
