= Blacks in Colorado Hall of Fame =

The location of the State of Colorado in the United States of America.

Blacks in Colorado Hall of Fame is a collaboration between Denver Public Library and Denver Public Schools to honor African American Coloradans who were the first in their field to accomplish a professional goal and/or who have actively supported the African American community while achieving their goal.

The original series contained forty-one photographs and was created in 1973 as part of a cooperative venture for Black Awareness Month between the Denver Public Library and the Denver Public Schools. In 1985, as part of the Ford-Warren Branch Library's 10th Anniversary Celebration, an additional four black Coloradoans were inducted into this Hall of Fame. Since then, every other year at least one is entered into the Hall of Fame Series.

== Inductees ==
Blacks in Colorado Hall of Fame
Name	Image	Birth–death	Year	Area of achievement
Walker Anderson		(1866–1904)	1973	Construction Man
Honorable Karen M. Ashby			2016	Colorado Court of Appeals
James A. Atkins		(1890–1968)	1973	Teacher
Ulysses H. Baker		(1869–1933)	1973	Police Detective
Odell C. Barry		(1941–2022)	2006	Politician and businessman
Jim Beckwourth		(1798–1866)	1973	Scout and trapper
Jerome C. Biffle		(1928–2002)	1973	Athlete and high school counselor
Jack Bradley		(1919–2000)	1973	Musician
Moses Brewer		(1947–)	2012	Multicultural relations/marketing
"Aunt" Clara Brown		(1800–1882)	1973	Freed slave-philanthropist
George L. Brown		(1926–2006)	1973	Lieutenant Governor of Colorado
Victoria "Vikki" Denise Buckley		(1949–1999)	2000	Colorado Secretary of State
Denise Burgess			N.D.	First African-American to chair the Denver Metro Chamber of Congress
Charles Burrell		(1920–)	N.D.	Musician
Byron Caldwell		(1926–2004)	1973	Civic Worker
Elvin R. Caldwell		(1919–2004)	1973	Denver city councilman
Thomas Campbell, LLD		(1869–1957)	1973	Attorney
Terrance D. Carroll		(1969–)	2010	Speaker of the House, CO House of Representatives
Alta Cousins		(1884–1971)	1973	
Charles Lilburn Cousins		(1881–1962)	1973	
Lulu Craig		(1867–1971)	1973	Teacher
Major Oleta Lawanda Crain		(1913–2007)	1996	WAAC/USAF - First African-American servicewoman from Colorado
Gilbert Cruter		(1915–2005)	1973	First African-American educator for Denver Public Schools
Honorable Wiley Y. Daniel		(1946–2019)	2012	Judge, U.S. District Court, District of Colorado
Hiawatha Davis Jr.		(1944–2000)	1998	Denver City Councilman
Evie Dennis		(1924–)	1990	First African-American and first woman superintendent of Denver Public Schools
Ruth Denny		(1920–2012)	2014	Educator and civil rights activist
Elva J. Dulan		(1914–2000)	1973	Public Health
Honorable James C. Flanigan		(1915–2008)	1973	Colorado's first African-American judge
Barney Ford		(1822–1902)	1973	Businessman
Justina Ford		(1871–1952)	1973	Colorado's first African-American woman physician
Eugene Gash		(1921–1995)	1973	Concert pianist
James C. Gaskin		(1916–2009)	1973	First African-American director, Veteran's administration hospital, Denver 1971–78
Bernard F. Gipson, M.D.		(1921–2015)	1973	Surgeon
Juanita Gray		(1916–1987)	1988	Civic leader
Zipporah Parks Hammond		(1924–2011)	2022	First African-American to graduate from nursing program in Colorado
Clarence F. Holmes, D.D.S.		(1892–1978)	1973	Dentist/Human rights and relations
Honorable Gary M. Jackson			2022	
Oliver Toussaint Jackson		(1862–1946)	1973	Pioneer
Ledyard C. Jones		(1895–1971)	1973	Bookkeeper and auditor
Honorable Raymond Dean Jones		(1945–)	1990	Colorado's first African-American appellate judge
Honorable Claudia J. Jordan		(1953–)	1996	Colorado's first African-American woman county court judge
Chief Roderick Juniel			2020	First African American Chief of the Denver Fire Department
Reverend Leon Kelly		(1956–)	2022	
Oglesvie L. "Sonny" Lawson		(1893–1969)	1973	Pharmacist/First African-American serving Denver Public Library Commission
Wendell T. Liggins		(1914–1991)	1985	Minister - Zion Baptist Church, Denver Public Library Commission member
Earl Mann		(1886–1969)	1973	Legislator/Writer, CO House of Representatives 1944–53
Keith "KC" Matthews		(1962–)	2000	Engineer- Colorado Department of Transportation
Jessie Whaley Maxwell		(1909–2002)	1998	Educator - Colorado and Denver's first African-American principal
Thomas E. McClain, D.D.S.		(1876–1949)	1973	First African-American licensed dentist in Colorado
Irene McWilliams		(1896–1990)	1973	Musician, teacher, and churchwoman
Ronald "Ron" Glen Miles		(1963–2022)	2023	Grammy-nominated jazz musician and composer
Adrian Miller			2024	Community leader and culinary historian
Syl Morgan-Smith		(1940–)	2002	Communicator and community leader
George Morrison Sr.		(1891–1974)	1973	Musician/composer
John William Mosley Jr.		(1921–2015)	1973	USAAC/USAF Ret., Administrator/civic leader
Rachel B. Noel		(1918–2008)	1973	Assistant professor of sociology
Sebastian Cabot Owens		(1913–1975)	1973	Director Colorado Urban League
Jacqueline G. Peterson-Hall		(1956–)	2000	Real estate developer
Harry E. Rahming		(1895–1985)	1973	Episcopal priest and theologian
"Daddy Bruce" Randolph		(1900–1994)	1985	Businessman and philanthropist
Alphonse D. Robinson		(1910–2000)	2004	Musician/composer
Cleo Parker Robinson		(1948–)	1994	Artistic director/ambassador
Pauline Short Robinson		(1915–1997)	1973	Librarian and civic leader
Dr. Jennie Mae Rucker		(1922–2018)	2019	
Edward J. Sanderlin		(1824–1891)	1973	Businessman
Gregory K. Scott		(1948–2021)	1994	Colorado's first African-American Supreme Court judge
Retired Division Chief Charles Thomas Smith			2024	Denver police
Paul Wilbert Stewart		(1925–2015)	1973	Museum curator
Arie Parks Taylor		(1927–2003)	2004	Politician, businesswoman, state representative in Colorado House of Representatives
Landri Taylor		(1950–)	2008	Civic leader, community affairs
William L. Turner		(1894–1971)	1973	Realtor
Peggy Underwood		(1921–2008)	1973	Secretary
Lu Vason		(1939–2015)	2010	Founder/Director Bill Pickett Rodeo
Columbus "Chris" Veasy Jr., Ph.D.		(1935–2021)	1998	Chairman, Denver County Democratic Party 1991
James "Dr. Daddio" Walker		(1939–)	2008	Black radio pioneer
James David Ward		(1917–1993)	1985	Educator
Wellington E. Webb		(1941–)	1988	Mayor, city of Denver
Wilma Webb		(1943–)	1985	First Lady of Denver, Colorado State representative
Elbra Wedgeworth		(1956–)	2014	City council president, Chief government and community relations officer
Joseph H.P. Westbrooke		(1878–1939)	1973	Physician, civic leader
Cecilia Kay White		(1962–)	1973	
William H. Whitsell		(1866–1944)	2024	First African-American male born in Colorado
Murphy C. Williams		(1916–1990)	1973	Pastor, businessman
Edna Wilson-Mosley		(1925–2014)	1992	First African-American city councilwoman, Aurora, CO
Peter C. Groff		(1963–)	2026	First African American President of the Colorado State Senate
Nancelia E. Scott Jackson		(1953–2024)	2026	Civic engagement

== See also ==
- Bibliography of Colorado
- Geography of Colorado
- History of Colorado
- Index of Colorado-related articles
- List of Colorado-related lists
- Outline of Colorado
