= Women's Bank of Denver =

The Women’s Bank N.A. of Denver was a nationally chartered bank focused on the financial needs of women. It was part of a broader movement to address the barriers to obtaining credit and financial services despite new laws, such as the Equal Credit Opportunity Act of 1974, which prohibited discrimination on the basis on sex or marital status. The bank’s creation had been fostered by grassroots efforts among professional women in the Denver area. The Women’s Bank of Denver officially opened on July 14, 1978, after raising two million dollars and securing a national charter. Like the First Women's Bank of New York, the Women's National Bank in Washington D.C., the First Women's Bank of California in Los Angeles, and numerous feminist credits unions throughout the United States, the Women’s Bank of Denver had to balance its vision of improving women’s access to financial services and capital with sound business practices. Arguably the most successful women’s bank of the era, the Women’s Bank of Denver became profitable in its first year of business and prospered until shareholders sold to investors in 1994. The bank ended its women-focused mission was renamed the Colorado Business Bank in 1997.

== History ==
The Women's Bank of Denver came about through the efforts of the Women's Association, a group specifically formed by businesswoman Carol Green and activist Bonnie Andrikopolous in 1975 to explore the possibility of opening a bank oriented towards and led by women. Discussion began in Green’s home in April, but by December, the group had sufficiently expanded to warrant meeting at Green’s place of business, the Weight Watcher’s franchise that she had opened with her husband after moving to Denver in 1968.

In addition to Green and Andrikopolous, key participants in the Women’s Association included well-connected socialites Betty Friedman and Barbara Sudler; attorney and local councilwoman Wendy Davis; community leader and civil rights advocate with the National Association for the Advancement of Colored People (NAACP), Edna Mosely; television host of the program Denver Now, on Channel 2, the local CBS affiliate, Beverly Martinez-Grall; and certified public accountant, Mike Feinstein. Members of the Women’s Association were required to contribute $1,000 to fund the organization’s activities. One of the first activities undertaken was a feasibility study to determine the viability of a new bank, who it would serve, and its location.

The bank's ten incorporators were Leslie Friedman Davis, Wendy Davis, Mike Feinstein, Betty Sue Friedman, Carol Green, Beverly Martinez-Grall, Edna Mosley, Loretta Norgren, Barbara Welch Sudler, and Judith Foster Wagner.

Other women involved in the formation of the bank include Gail Schoettler and Doris M. Drury.

The majority of members on the board of directors were women and LaRae Orullian was recruited to be the organization's first president and chairwoman.

== Other women's banks ==
First Woman's Bank of Tennessee was the first women's bank in the United States, having been founded in 1917.
