= Bill Owens (Colorado politician) =

40th Governor of Colorado

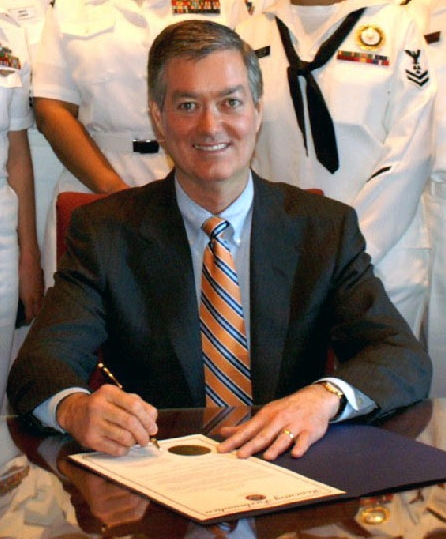
- Owens in 2006

40th Governor of Colorado
- In office January 12, 1999 – January 9, 2007
- Lieutenant: Joe Rogers; Jane Norton
- Preceded by: Roy Romer
- Succeeded by: Bill Ritter

51st Treasurer of Colorado
- In office January 3, 1995 – January 3, 1999
- Governor: Roy Romer
- Preceded by: Gail Schoettler
- Succeeded by: Mike Coffman

Member of the Colorado Senate from the 27th district
- In office January 1989 – January 1995
- Preceded by: Ralph Cole
- Succeeded by: Mike Coffman

Member of the Colorado House of Representatives from the 49th district
- In office January 1983 – January 1989
- Preceded by: Candace Dyer
- Succeeded by: Mike Coffman

Personal details
- Born: William Forrester Owens; October 22, 1950 (age 76) Fort Worth, Texas, U.S.
- Party: Republican
- Spouse: Frances Owens (m. 1975; div. 2010)
- Children: 3
- Education: Stephen F. Austin State University (BA); University of Texas, Austin (MPA)

William Forrester Owens (born October 22, 1950) is an American former politician who served as the 40th governor of Colorado, from 1999 to 2007. A member of the Republican Party, he was re-elected in 2002, amassing 62.6% of the vote, the largest Republican share of the vote in state history. As of 2026, he is the most recent Republican to have served as governor of Colorado.

== Early life ==
Owens was born in Fort Worth, Texas, where he graduated from Paschal High School. While a sophomore in high school, Owens was appointed a Page in the U.S. House of Representatives by Congressman (and later, Speaker of the House) Jim Wright. Owens was assigned by the Doorkeeper of the House to the Republican cloakroom, where he worked for notable Republicans who were serving in the House then such as George H. W. Bush, Gerald Ford, and Bob Dole.

He attended Stephen F. Austin State University where he served as vice president and president of the student body. While at Stephen F. Austin, Owens served as a coordinator of the Students for George Bush in George H.W. Bush's unsuccessful campaign for the U.S. Senate. It was during this campaign that Owens would first meet future President George W. Bush. Owens earned a master's degree in Public Affairs from the University of Texas, Lyndon B. Johnson School of Public Affairs, where he was awarded a full two-year fellowship.

Following his graduate work, Owens accepted a position in the Washington, D.C., office of Touche Ross & Company. He moved to Colorado in 1977, after accepting a position with the Gates Corporation. He later served as executive director of the Colorado Petroleum Association, and as Executive Vice President of the Rocky Mountain Oil and Gas Association.

=== Early political career ===
Owens served as a member of the Colorado House of Representatives from 1982 until 1988, and as a state senator from 1988 to 1994, representing Aurora and Arapahoe County.

While in the Legislature, Owens was active in tax reform, privatization and school choice initiatives, sponsoring the nation's third charter school law. He served as chair of both the House and Senate State, Veterans and Military Affairs Committees and as Chair of the National Conference of State Legislatures (NCSL) Energy Committee, as well as on NCSL's executive committee.

Owens was elected to statewide office as Colorado State Treasurer in 1994, where he was responsible for managing the state's $5 billion in investment funds. He served during this time on the board of Colorado's $25 billion pension fund, the Colorado Public Employees Retirement Association (PERA).

== Governorship ==
=== First term ===
Owens was elected as the 40th Governor of Colorado in the 1998 governor's race, when he defeated Democratic opponent Gail Schoettler by 8,300 votes (less than one percent of ballots cast). When he was inaugurated on January 12, 1999, Owens became Colorado's first Republican governor in 24 years. His platform was three pronged: cut taxes, repair Colorado's aging infrastructure, and continue school accountability reforms.

==== Tax cuts ====
Upon entering office, Owens worked with a legislature controlled by his own Republican party to push through the largest tax cut package in state history, amounting to $1 billion in rate cuts to the sales, personal-income, and capital-gains taxes. Owens also championed, and eventually won, the elimination of the state's marriage penalty. By 2006, the Owens administration estimated the overall tax cuts pushed through during his administration was around $3.6 billion.

==== TRANS and T-REX ====
In November 1999, Owens brought his transportation funding initiative to the ballot. Called TRANS, the $1.7 billion bonding initiative accelerated future federal transportation dollars on 28 road projects across the state. The keystone project was the Transportation Expansion, dubbed T-REX.

T-REX combined new road funding from TRANS to widen and expand Interstate 25 through Denver with $460 million-worth of new light rail lines to link downtown Denver with the Denver Tech Center. Through an innovative design-build concept that greatly reduced construction times, T-REX was finished in less than five years, and came in under budget.

==== Education reform ====
Owens based his education reforms on expanding and empowering the already-established Colorado Student Assessment Program (CSAP), which was created during the governorship of Roy Romer. Owens added "accountability reports" to the tests, which provided parents with a 'school report card' to allow them to better assess the performance of Colorado's public schools. He also expanded Colorado's charter school program (which he had sponsored as a state legislator in the 1990s).

=== Second term ===
Owens won reelection in the 2002 governor's race by defeating Democratic nominee, Boulder businessman Rollie Heath, 64%–32%—the greatest majority in Colorado history. Shortly before the election, Owens was proclaimed by National Review as "America's Best Governor".

In the summer of 2002, when the Hayman Fire and Coal Seam Fire ravaged much of Western Colorado, Owens made perhaps the first major press faux-pas of his tenure. Responding to a reporter's question following an aerial tour of the fires ("What does it look like up there?"), Owens said "It looks as if all of Colorado is burning today". Many western slope residents blamed Owens for driving away tourists with the press's truncated version of the quote ("All of Colorado is burning").

In November 2003, Colorado voters rejected Owens’ water storage initiative, Referendum A, by 67% to 33%. The referendum failed to win a single county in the state, as opponents successfully savaged the measure as a "blank check". Owens would later joke, "it takes a particularly adept Governor to lose a water referendum in the face of a 300-year drought." While the initiative was supported by most Colorado newspapers and business groups, it was opposed by the environmental community and many on Colorado's Western Slope who feared it would lead to the Front Range using more Western Slope water.

Leading up to the 2004 primary, Owens caused some controversy in the Republican Party by announcing support for Bob Schaffer's run to replace retiring U.S. Senator Ben Nighthorse Campbell, but then endorsing Pete Coors when Coors later announced his entry two days later.

Democrat Bill Ritter was elected in November 2006 to replace the term-limited Owens.

==== Referendum C ====
In 2005, Owens faced what former governor Dick Lamm termed "the test of his time." Conflicting budget measures in Colorado's Taxpayer Bill of Rights (TABOR), which caps government spending, and the voter-endorsed Amendment 23, which mandates increases in education funding) combined with a nationwide recession to leave Colorado's budget 17% below 2001 levels. A "glitch", as Owens termed it, in TABOR prevented the budget from rebounding once the recession reversed.

Owens angered some conservatives by working with moderate Republican and Democratic legislators to craft and endorse what became known as Referendum C, essentially a 5-year timeout from TABOR's spending restrictions. National conservative leaders such as Grover Norquist and Dick Armey publicly criticized the measure and Owens’ support thereof. Referendum C passed with 52% of the vote in November 2005.

While it was endorsed by every major newspaper in the state as well as the state Chamber of Commerce, it was nevertheless controversial. Owens served as Vice Chair and Chair of the Republican Governors Association, and was elected by his colleagues as chair of the Western Governors Association.

He debated public policy in person including well publicized debates with Democratic Chair Howard Dean on the Patriot Act before the ACLU National Convention in San Francisco; with Dr. Larry Summers at the Aspen Institute; with former Illinois Governor George Ryan on the death penalty at Michigan State University; with ACLU Executive Director Anthony Romero on the Patriot Act at Northwestern State University; and with Justice Adrian Hardiman, the former Chief Justice of the Irish Supreme Court on the death penalty at the University College Dublin, Ireland.

Owens was a regular participant and panelist at the World Economic Forum in Davos, Switzerland, appearing in 2005 on a panel debating U.S. foreign policy with Senators Joe Biden and Chris Dodd.

== Post-political career ==
Owens currently serves as a senior director at the international law firm of Greenberg Traurig, LLP where he works on public policy and regulatory issues. He is on a number of public boards including Key Energy (NYSE:KEG); Cloud Peak Energy (NYSE); Bill Barrett Corporation (NYSE:BBG), and Federal Signal (NYSE:FSS).

Owens currently works with Renewable Water Resources (RWR), a company proposing the export of water from Colorado's San Luis Valley.

Owens formerly served as chairman of the board for Credit Bank of Moscow (MOEX:CBOM), but stepped down on February 27, 2022, in response to the Russian invasion of Ukraine.

Owens joined the University of Denver's Institute for Public Policy Studies in January 2007 as a senior fellow.

Owens was an early supporter of Mitt Romney's 2008 presidential campaign. After Romney dropped out of the race, Owens worked actively for John McCain's campaign. He endorsed Romney again for the 2012 Republican nomination and served as co-chair of Romney's Colorado campaign.

== Family life ==
Owens married Frances Owens in January 1975, and divorced in 2010. The couple has three children, Monica Owens-Beauprez, Mark, and Brett.

Political offices
Preceded by Gail Schoettler	Treasurer of Colorado; 1995–1999	Succeeded by Mike Coffman
Preceded by Roy Romer	Governor of Colorado; 1999–2007	Succeeded by Bill Ritter
Party political offices
Preceded by Bruce D. Benson	Republican nominee for Governor of Colorado; 1998, 2002	Succeeded by Bob Beauprez
Preceded by John G. Rowland	Chair of the Republican Governors Association; 2002–2003	Succeeded by Bob Taft
U.S. order of precedence (ceremonial)
Preceded by Roy Romer as Former Governor	Order of precedence of the United States	Succeeded by Bill Ritter as Former Governor
