= Jessie Whaley Maxwell =

First Black school principal in Colorado

- Born: October 9, 1909; Mansfield, Louisiana
- Died: July 26, 2002 (aged 92); Denver, CO
- Occupation: Educator
- Spouse: Hulett Maxwell

Jessie Whaley Maxwell (1909 – 2002) was an American educator who was the first African-American school principal in the Denver Public School system and the state of Colorado.

== Biography ==
Jessie Whaley was born on October 9, 1909, in Mansfield, Louisiana to parents John and Julia Carter Whaley.

Her family lived on the campus of a boarding school, Northwest Institute, where her parents taught. Her father was president and her mother taught music and English.

== Education ==
Maxwell received a bachelor of science degree from Bishop College in Marshall, Texas, and afterward, moved to Denver to live with her aunt. She then received a bachelor of music and master of music education degrees from University of Denver.

During her time at Bishop College, Maxwell joined the Delta Sigma Theta sorority. In 1939, Maxwell, Mae Adams, and Elaine Brown Jenkins formed the Beta Phi chapter in Denver. Maxwell was elected as the first Treasurer.

== Career ==
From 1942 to 1975, she served as teacher and administrator in Denver Public Schools, and was an instructor at the University of Denver and Regis College. She began her teaching career in 1942 as a permanent substitute teacher at Whittier Elementary, then became a full-time music teacher. She was one of the first Black teachers in Denver.

In 1955, Maxwell was appointed as Principal at Whittier elementary school. She was the first African-American school principal in the Denver Public Schools. At that time, teachers did not apply to be principals but they had to be nominated. The Black community leaders in Denver called for Maxwell to get the job. The community she served was mostly white and Jewish, and the student body was 2/3 white and 1/3 Black.

Maxwell made several major changes at Whittier. She implemented the first science and reading night classes in Denver. She kept the school open until 9 p.m. for latchkey kids and students who played sports.

In 1966 she became Principal of Columbine elementary school, where she stayed until her retirement in 1972.

In 1980, Maxwell received an Honorary Doctorate of Humane Letters from University of Denver.

Maxwell and her husband established the Maxwell Education Fund to support college students who belong to Zion Baptist Church.

Maxwell was a board member of:

- YWCA
- Denver Metropolitan Mental Health Association
- Stovall Care Center
- Bishop College Alumni Association
- Denver Girls, INC

Maxwell was a life member of:

- NAACP
- National Education Association
- Colorado Parent-Teachers Association

=== Personal life ===
Jessie Whaley married Hulett A. Maxwell, who was an African American pharmacist in Denver. They were married after a four-week courtship.

Maxwell and her husband were members of the Zion Baptist Church. Maxwell was the organist and music director of the church.

=== Death and legacy ===
Maxwell died July 26, 2002, of natural causes.

== Recognition ==
As early as 1972, Juanita Gray spoke for a group of Denver residents to suggest naming a new Denver elementary school for Maxwell. In 1998, Jessie Whaley Maxwell Elementary School was dedicated to her in Montbello. The Denver school board waived the requirement that sites can only be named posthumously.

In 1998, Maxwell was inducted to the Blacks in Colorado Hall of Fame.

== Publications ==
- Maxwell, J. (1942). A diagnostic comparison of the educational contribution made by various textbooks in public school music.
