= Orullian =

Orullian is a surname. Notable people with the surname include:

- B. LaRae Orullian (born 1933), American banker and civic leader
- Peter Orullian (born 1969), American fantasy author and musician
