= Bruce D. Benson =

President of the University of Colorado

Bruce Benson
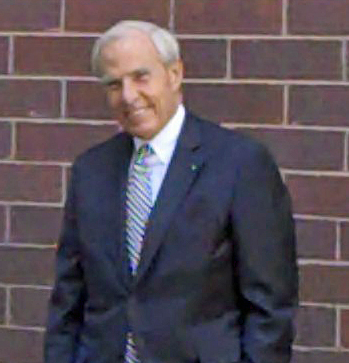

22nd President of the University of Colorado
- In office March 2008 – July 1, 2019
- Preceded by: Hank Brown
- Succeeded by: Mark Kennedy

Chair of the Colorado Republican Party
- In office 1987–1993

Personal details
- Born: Bruce Davey Benson; July 4, 1938 (age 87) Chicago, Illinois, U.S.
- Party: Republican
- Spouse: Marcy Benson
- Education: Cornell University; University of Colorado, Boulder (BS)

Bruce Davey Benson (born July 4, 1938) is a United States businessman and educational administrator, who served as the 22nd president of the University of Colorado (CU) from March 2008 to July 1, 2019.

== Education ==
Benson graduated from the Berkshire School and then studied at Cornell University before earning his bachelor's degree in geology from CU-Boulder in 1964. He received an Honorary Doctorate of Humane Letters from CU in 2004.

== Business career ==
In 1965, Benson founded the Benson Mineral Group, an oil and gas exploration and production company. Since then, his business interests have expanded to include banking, mortgage servicing, real estate development and management, geothermal power, manufacturing, trucking, restaurants and cable television. In 2009 he was inducted into the Colorado Business Hall of Fame.

Benson has sat on boards of directors of dozens of companies, including United States Exploration, American Land Lease Corporation, Western Capital Investment Corporation and First Interstate Bank of Denver.

Three different Colorado governors have named Benson to educational initiatives and governing boards, all of which he chaired: the Colorado Commission on Higher Education (1985–89), Metropolitan State College Board of Trustees (2003–07), P-20 Education Coordinating Council (2007–08) and the Governor's Blue Ribbon Panel for Higher Education (2001–03). Outside Colorado, he was board chair of the Berkshire School in Massachusetts (1984–94) and also served on the board of Smith College (1988–95).

Nationally, Benson was a member of the board of directors of the National Park Service and was confirmed by the U.S. Senate as a member of the National Endowment for the Humanities.

== President of CU ==
Benson became president of the University of Colorado in March 2008. He celebrated his 10th anniversary in March 2018, becoming the longest serving CU president of the past 65 years. During Benson's tenure, CU's research funding reached record levels several years (including topping $1 billion in 2016–17).

Benson and his wife, Marcy Head Benson, chaired CU's $1.5 billion Creating Futures fundraising campaign, which was announced in April 2011 and concluded in November 2013 with $1.53 billion in donations to support scholarships, academic enhancements (endowed faculty positions, programs), research projects and capital improvements across CU's campuses.

On July 18, 2018, Benson announced his intention to retire, effective July 2019.

== Controversies ==
Benson was selected as CU president amid concerns among the CU faculty and community members about his lack of academic pedigree and for climate change denial, close connection to partisan politics (Benson unsuccessfully ran for Governor of Colorado as the Republican nominee in 1994), and close ties to the oil and gas industry. However, Benson—the longest sitting president in the past 65 years—has become notable for his philanthropy, not accepting salary increases and described as the university's "volunteer" president.

In 2012 after the State of Colorado passed Colorado Amendment 64 legalizing the use of recreational marijuana, Benson sent an email to constituents commenting on his personal disapproval of the amendment and erroneously suggesting that the CU system would lose federal funding because of its passage.

Benson founded the Benson Center for the Study of Western Civilization at the University of Colorado. For the 2020–21 academic year, the Center's "Visiting Scholar for Conservative Thought and Policy" was John Eastman, (Note: As of August 2023, John Eastman is under disbarment proceedings in California because his conduct represents "moral turpitude, dishonesty, and corruption" and is "an egregious and unprecedented attack on our democracy" and he "violated this duty in furtherance of an attempt to usurp the will of the American people and overturn election results for the highest office in the land — an egregious and unprecedented attack on our democracy — for which he must be held accountable," according to the State Bar's chief trial counsel, George Cardona.) a former professor at the Chapman School of Law, who advised President Donald Trump on legal theories to reverse the results of the 2020 Presidential election when Joe Biden defeated Trump. In a June 19, 2022 editorial, the Denver Post called on CU to essentially close the Center (" revoke the center's space on campus" and "remove CU's good name from the center's title") due to Eastman's actions while visiting scholar. Eastman used his CU email to email his legal theories to the White House, addressed the "Save America Rally" prior to the January 6, 2021 attack on the Capitol, and acknowledged that his strategy to overturn the election would probably be rejected 9-0 by the Supreme Court. It is unknown whether Benson intervened in Eastman's actions during his tenure as visiting scholar at the Benson Center, which suspended Eastman on January 21, 2021.

== Politics ==
Benson was the chairman of the Colorado Republican Party from 1987 to 1993 and was the Republican nominee for Colorado governor in an unsuccessful 1994 bid.

== Personal life ==
Benson and his second wife Marcy have three children and 10 grandchildren.

== Notes ==
Party political offices
Preceded by John Andrews	Republican nominee for Governor of Colorado; 1994	Succeeded by Bill Owens
