= Lulu Craig =

Homesteader, historian and educator (1867–1971)

Lulu Mae Sadler Craig
- Born: August 12, 1868; Platte County, Missouri, US
- Died: September 25, 1972 (aged 104); Manzanola, Colorado, US
- Occupations: Homesteader, historian and educator
- Spouse: Sanford Gustave Craig (m. 1886; died 1941)

Lulu Mae Sadler Craig (1868–1972), sometimes called Lula, was an early homesteader of southern Colorado. She was a historian, educator, and civic leader. Her records of the Black settlements in Kansas and Colorado have been valuable documents in recording the history of homesteaders.

== Biography ==
Lulu Sadler was born on August 12, 1868, in Platte County, Missouri.

Her parents were Meridee or Merriday George Sadler and Harriet Ellen Samuels, who were former slaves. She had 7 siblings. Her family moved from Missouri to Kansas in 1872, traveling in a covered wagon.

They migrated from Missouri and arrived in Nicodemus, Kansas, in 1879. She wrote about her experiences and the early history of Nicodemus. Her writings have been instrumental in recording and preserving the history of this all-Black settlement. Nicodemus was settled by "exodusters", former slaves who left the south and migrated to Kansas. The settlement was advertised with promises of free land and freedom from racism, but the family only found dugouts dug into the ground where the residents stayed.

When Craig was 15 years old, she attended one of the first schools in Kansas alongside classmate George Washington Carver. She graduated from State Teachers College at Emporia, Kansas. She taught grades 1 through 8 with little support. She received her teaching certification in rural eastern Colorado before returning to Nicodemus.

She also served on the Nicodemus election board in 1914, which was rare for a woman.

In April 1915, the Sadler and Craig families moved further west to Colorado, after deteriorating conditions in Nicodemus.

From there, her family was one of the first 100 African Americans to settle in an area of southern Colorado called "The Dry" near Manzanola, Colorado. This was another all-Black community and her family was one of the first to settle.

Craig taught at the one room schoolhouse, called Prairie Valley School, from 1916 until it closed in 1933. The school also served as a church and a community center, where Craig started a literary society that met there. She also led Sunday School services.

The Hubbard Chapel was built in La Junta in 1921, and Craig was a founding member and the first deaconess. Her daughter Mae Crowell continued her involvement, being an ordained minister and assistant pastor from 1960 to 1977.

During and after the depression, many people moved away from The Dry. Craig and her family were some of the last original settlers to remain until the 1970s. Her home burnt down in 1998, possibly from vandalism.

She was a member of the Colorado Writer's Club, and wrote an unpublished manuscript called "A History of Nicodemus: Graham County, Kansas." This document is preserved in the Kenneth Spencer Research Library at the University of Kansas.

On August 12, 1970, her extended family traveled to Manzanola, Colorado to celebrate her 102nd birthday. The celebration was filmed by Harry Belafonte Enterprises, and produced and directed by Richard Kaplan. The documentary Happy Birthday Mrs. Craig provides interviews with Craig and members of her family, as well as a living history of the American West.

=== Personal life ===
She married Sanford Gustave Craig in 1886 in Nicodemus. They were married until his death in 1941.

Her children:

- Hattie Ellen Craig Burney (1887-1988)
- Harvey James Craig (1889-1970)
- Viola Margaret Craig Mitchell (1892-1975)
- Theophilus Nelson Craig (1895-1976)
- Mae Drusella Craig Crowell (1899-1993)
- Lucille Craig (1906-1917)
- Lenetta Craig Stark (1908-1956)
- Merido Sanford Craig (1910-2007)
- Terracitia Craig (1913-1914)

=== Death and legacy ===
Craig died on September 25, 1972, at the age of 104. She is buried in Manzanola Mountainview Cemetery.

Craig was one of the original 1973 inductees into the Blacks in Colorado Hall of Fame.

Happy Birthday Mrs. Craig is still an important film in Black history, and is still shown to students.

Scholar Justin Hosbey argues that Craig's work is often overlooked by ethno-historians and official NPR historians "because Black women's narratives and their construction of Nicodemus's heritage resists the masculinist prerogatives of the [National Park Service]'s historiographical frameworks, which privilege political, economic, and military spheres that were dominated by men." In conversation with the Nicodemus Historical Society, Hosbey found that scholars did not include Craig's work and other oral histories because they could not corroborate with "concrete" historical sources. A top officer of the National Park Service described the descendant narratives as "myths" rather than important local folklore that explored relationships between the Black community and Native Americans.

== Published works ==
- L.S. Craig. A History of Nicodemus: Graham County, Kansas, Kenneth Spencer Research Library, University of Kansas.
- Happy Birthday Mrs. Craig

== See also ==
- Exodusters
- History of African Americans in Kansas
