= Claudia J. Jordan =

First Black female judge in Colorado, US

- Born: 1953 (age 72–73)
- Education: University of North Carolina, Charlotte; University of Colorado School of Law
- Occupation: Retired Judge

Honorable Claudia J. Jordan (born 1953) is a retired judge in Colorado. Jordan was the first Black female judge in the Rocky Mountain region, seated in 1994. She retired in 2014.

Claudia Jean Jordan grew up in North Carolina, raised by her grandparents in a sharecropping family. Many adults had only an elementary level education, and Jordan heard the adults around her talking about how they needed a good lawyer. She became the kid in the neighborhood who read legal documents to neighbors who could not read. She attended segregated schools until 10th grade.

Jordan was the first Black analyst for the Colorado Legislative Council. She helped put together the blue book for voters.

Jordan earned a bachelor's degree from the University of North Carolina, Charlotte in political science in 1975. Jordan was only one of three Black students and the only Black woman in her law school class at the University of Colorado School of Law. She graduated in 1980, and was admitted to the State Bar of Colorado in 1982.

Jordan began her legal career as a law clerk for Hon. Morris Cole on the 2nd Judicial District Court. Another of her mentors was James Flanagan. She started out as a deputy state public defender from 1982 to 1987, and served as a private practice attorney from 1987 to 1994.

In 1994, Jordan was appointed to the Denver County Court by Mayor Wellington Webb, and became the first Black female judge in the Rocky Mountain region.

Jordan retired in 2014 after 20 years on the bench. Mayor Michael Hancock recognized her work by proclaiming September 30 as Claudia Jordan Day.

Jordan served on the board of trustees for the Denver Bar Association, and the board of governors of the Colorado Bar Association.

== Recognition ==
- 2014, University of Colorado School of Law Alumni Honoree
- 2011, Colorado Women's Bar Association Judicial Reception Honoree
- 1998, Colorado Women's Bar Association Mary Lathrop Trailblazer Award
- 1996, Blacks in Colorado Hall of Fame
