= Edna Wilson-Mosley =

American politician, civil rights activist and educator

- Born: May 31, 1925; Helena, Arkansas
- Died: August 26, 2014 (aged 89); Denver, Colorado
- Occupations: Politician, civil rights activist, and educator
- Spouse: John Mosley

Edna Wilson-Mosley (May 31, 1925 – August 26, 2014) was a prominent politician, civil rights activist, and educator in Denver and Aurora, Colorado. Wilson-Mosley was a civil rights specialist for Colorado's Civil Rights Commission. She was the only Black founder of the Women's Bank of Denver and served on the board of directors. She was married to John Mosley, a highly respected and original Tuskegee Airman.

== Biography ==
=== Early life ===
Edna Wilson was born May 31, 1925, in Helena, Arkansas. Her mother and grandmother were both named Edna, as well as her daughter, and a granddaughter. Her sister-in-law is the mother of Congresswoman Maxine Waters.

She attended Manual High School and the University of Northern Colorado in 1943.

During World War II, she worked in the defense industry.

Wilson-Mosley and her husband moved to Aurora in 1965, when Mosley transferred to Lowry Air Force Base. They had four children together.

She returned to college and graduated in the first graduating class at Metropolitan State College in Denver in 1969. At the time she was a "non-traditional" student: 44 years old, a mother, and a career woman.

=== Activism and career ===
In 1954, Wilson-Mosley visited relatives in Helena, Arkansas and on the day they returned to Denver, a white man on the train platform asked them to leave. She refused and spent the night in jail. She told this story as an explanation and inciting incident for her lifelong involvement in racial equity.

From 1969 to 1970, Wilson-Mosley worked for the Colorado Civil Rights Commission as a civil rights specialist, and as the community relations coordinator from 1970 to 1974. She then worked for the Colorado State and Department of Personnel as the assistant state affirmative action coordinator until 1978, and then went to the University of Denver as affirmative action director.

Wilson-Mosley was a founder of The Women's Bank, now called Colorado Business Bank. In 1975, she borrowed $1,000 from a credit union without telling her husband to help finance a bank that would cater to women. It was uncommon for women to hold bank accounts without their husbands' permission, and Wilson-Mosley wanted to improve access and opportunities for women. Along with 49 other contributors, the organizing group raised $50,000 to establish the bank. At that time she was the only African American on the organizing team.

In 1991, Wilson-Mosley was the first Black city council member in Aurora, Colorado, where she served for 12 years. She was influential in the community by sponsoring anti-gang programs, local gun control legislation, and racial equality efforts.

=== Community involvement ===
Wilson-Mosley was an active member of the Colorado community. She was the member of the following organizations:

- Women's Forum Colorado - Best Sustaining Public Affairs Program, Colorado Broadcasting Association 1972
- Co-chairman of the Denver/Nairobi Sister City Committee, and President of Denver Sister Cities Int. 1976–80
- Board of directors and founding member, Women's Bank NA Denver, 1978–80
- National Social Action Community
- Life member, Delta Sigma Theta sorority, 1979–81
- Director, Higher Education Affirmative Action
- National Association of Affirmative Action Officers
- Colorado Black Women Political Action
- Delta Sigma Theta Denver Alumnae Chapter
- Director, Fitzsimmons Redevelopment Authority
- Director, Aurora Economic Development Council
- National Association for the Advancement of Colored People (NAACP)

=== Death and afterward ===
Edna died on August 26, 2014.

== Recognition ==
- 1977 - Lola M. Parker Achievement Award, Iota Phi Lambda Far Western region
- 1978 - Headliner Award, Women in Communications, Inc.
- 1978 - Appreciation Award, National Association of Black Accountants
- 1979 - Distinguished Service Award, International Student Organizations at the University of Denver
- 1984 - Businesswoman of the Year, Aurora Area Business and Professional Women
- 1986 - Distinguished Alumnus, Metropolitan State College
- 1988 - Humanitarian Award, Martin Luther King Jr. Holiday Commission
- 1989 - Juanita Gray Community Service Award
- 1992 - Blacks in Colorado Hall of Fame Inductees
- 2004 - Honorary doctorate from Colorado State University

The Central Park neighborhood was renamed in 2020, and Mosley was one of the options. It was ultimately not chosen.

Aurora Public Schools opened the Edna and John W. Mosley P-8 on October 1, 2015.

=== John and Edna Mosley Scholarship Fund ===
After years of serving the community, friends and community members raised money to present to the Mosley's to allow them to go on vacation abroad to enjoy themselves. The community raised thousands of dollars to honor and show thanks to the Mosley's philanthropy throughout the years. The Mosley's instead had a different plan for this money: they agreed to accept the money raised, if only they could start a scholarship fund with it, instead of a vacation for themselves. Since its start in 2002, this scholarship fund has helped numerous African American students from the Denver-Metro area, equaling in $28,000 worth of scholarship dollars given to the recipients. The requirements for this scholarship include: one must be African American, have a desire to further their education in a university, college or another accredited post-secondary school and must have accumulated a GPA of 2.5 of higher. This scholarship fund looks for students who take charge of their lives to better them, such as maintaining good grades and having leadership roles, once the finalist are accepted the scholarship board will then hold interviews to ensure that the Mosley scholarship is awarded to the perfect candidate to honor the Mosley's. This scholarship fund is now the largest and oldest community fund in the entire state of Colorado. Following his death, the Mosley family asked the public to please not send the family flowers, but instead donate a dollar to his scholarship fund to honor one of his life goals to help African American students achieve their full potential in post-secondary education.
