= Joe Rogers (politician) =

American politician (1964–2013)

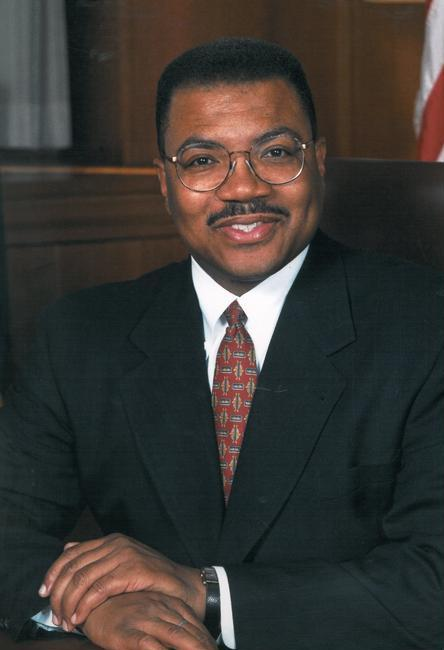

45th Lieutenant Governor of Colorado
- In office January 12, 1999 – January 14, 2003
- Governor: Bill Owens
- Preceded by: Gail Schoettler
- Succeeded by: Jane Norton

Personal details
- Born: Joseph Bernard Rogers; July 8, 1964 Omaha, Nebraska, U.S.
- Died: October 7, 2013 (aged 49) Denver, Colorado, U.S.
- Resting place: Fairmount Cemetery Denver, Colorado
- Party: Republican
- Spouse: Juanita Rogers
- Education: Colorado State University (BA); Arizona State University (JD)

Joseph Bernard Rogers (July 8, 1964 – October 7, 2013) was an American politician and attorney who served as the 45th Lieutenant Governor of Colorado from 1999 to 2003. He was a member of the Republican Party and unsuccessfully mounted congressional campaigns in 1996 and 2002.

== Early life and education ==
Rogers was born on July 8, 1964, in Omaha, Nebraska to Joe Louis Rogers and Lola Marie Rogers. He later moved with his family to Colorado, and was raised in Commerce City. He earned a Bachelor of Arts degree from Colorado State University and Juris Doctor from the Arizona State University College of Law. Rogers was a member of Alpha Phi Alpha fraternity.

== Career ==
As an attorney, Rogers practiced law in Colorado and served as staff counsel to U.S. Senator Hank Brown. In 1996, Rogers ran for Colorado's 1st congressional district as a Republican, gaining 42% of the vote against Democrat Diana DeGette.

In 1998, he was elected the second black lieutenant governor of Colorado after George L. Brown, who served from 1975 to 1979. As lieutenant governor, Rogers was a principal speaker at the 2000 Republican National Convention. In June 2002, state auditors reported that Rogers' office spent over $12,000 in unsubstantiated purchases.

Personal and political conflicts with his running mate, Governor Bill Owens, kept him off the reelection ticket in 2002. Issues that strained their professional relationship included disagreements over spending and funeral arrangements for Vikki Buckley, the former state Secretary of State.

Rogers instead ran in the newly created 7th congressional district, but placed last out of four in the 2002 Republican primary, receiving just 13% of the vote, behind the eventual winner in the general election, Bob Beauprez. His campaign for Congress received scrutiny from the Federal Election Commission (FEC) over his campaign funds.

== Death ==
Rogers died after being admitted to the hospital due to back pains on October 7, 2013. After his death, he was honored by Owens, whom he served under as lieutenant governor.

== See also ==
- List of minority governors and lieutenant governors in the United States

Political offices
Preceded by Gail Schoettler	Lieutenant Governor of Colorado; 1999–2003	Succeeded by Jane Norton
