= Colorado ACT =

Admission test in Colorado, US

The Colorado ACT (COACT) is a specific version of the ACT made for Colorado students. It is used instead of the CSAP to test the progress of 11th Grade students (high school juniors) in the state.

Overview: The 11th grade ACT assessment, which is more commonly known as the Colorado ACT (CO ACT), is administered once in April and once in May. This assessment is equivalent to all other ACT Assessments administered on national test dates throughout the country. Since this is an actual college entrance exam, results from this assessment can be submitted for college entrance by the student to their college or university of choice.

The CO ACT Assessment consists of two parts which are designed to help students prepare for postsecondary educational opportunities. The first part is a pre-test session which includes an interest inventory, a student profile section, and a course/grade section. The second part is the academic assessment section which includes tests in the areas of English, Mathematics, Reading, and Science. From the tests, students receive a composite score along with scores for each of the skill areas. The CO ACT assessment also provides two sub scores in English, three sub scores in Mathematics, and two sub scores in Reading. The highest composite score ever recorded in Colorado was 29.8 by Thomas McLaren school in Colorado Springs.
