= Ruth Denny =

African American educator and civil rights activist in Denver, Colorado

- Born: November 1, 1920; St. Louis, Missouri
- Died: October 9, 2012 (aged 91); Denver, Colorado
- Occupations: Teacher and civil rights leader

Ruth Cousins Denny (November 1, 1920 - October 9, 2012) was a Black educator and civil rights activist in Denver, Colorado. Denny dedicated her life to combating racial injustice and educating young people. Denny was a founding member of the Denver chapter of Congress of Racial Equality (CORE) and led direct actions around Denver.

== Early life ==
Denny was born on November 1, 1920, in St. Louis, Missouri to Stanard S. Cousins and Mamie Louise Carr Cousins. Denny's grandmother was a slave whose job was to fan the mistress of the home. Her father died when she was 4 or 5 years old, and left behind five young children. Her father had been a chauffeur for the Rand family, owners of International Shoe Company, and her mother worked as domestic help and as a nanny. Denny was influenced by watching her mother face racial discrimination, and wanted to become a lawyer to fight racial injustice, however, at that time it was an impossibility.

== Career and activism ==
Denny earned her bachelor's degree from Stowe Teacher's College. She later earned graduate studies credits from St. Louis University, University of Denver, and University of Colorado.

She began teaching at her alma mater, Sumner High School, in 1944.

She moved to Denver in 1951 and worked for the Air Force Accounting and Finance Center. Denny moved out west because she thought it would be a more liberal and accepting place than Missouri, and was surprised when she faced similar discrimination in Colorado.

Once in Denver, it took her 10 years to get a teaching job with Denver Public Schools (DPS). When she applied in 1952, she was told she was "too fat." She lost 80 pounds in a year and once again approached DPS. She was told she had a kidney condition that did not allow her to teach. With a clean bill of health from a doctor, she was once again denied because she was "too hairy" to teach. In 1962, she was hired as a substitute teacher and later as a permanent teacher, taught at Gilpin Elementary and Asbury Elementary for 26 years.

Denny was a civil rights leader in Denver during the 1950s and 1960s. She was an organizer of the Denver chapter of CORE, and led fundraising for activities of CORE, including sending two busloads of Coloradoans to the March on Washington in 1963.

Her community activities included:

- Member of the board of directors for Denver Opportunity (War on Poverty)
- Member of the program committee with YWCA for the teenage girls group
- Temporary chair of the Barrett Elementary School PTA
- Board member of United for Progress, UNICEF, NAACP, and OIC
- Member of Colorado Bi-Centennial Committee and the African American Advisory Council of the Colorado Historical Society
- Volunteer for the Set Free Prison Ministry
- Organizer of Montview Integration Committee and Presbyterian Women
- Member of the League of Women Voters
- Member of the Denver Urban League
- Member of the Colorado Historical Society

She led many activities to improve civil rights in Denver, including picketing at businesses that used discriminatory hiring and promotion practices; promoted fair policies in Denver Public Schools for both teachers and children; and integrated the Sportland YMCA by being the first African American family to purchase a family membership.

One target of her activism was Denver Dry Goods, a department store which only employed Black people as janitors. CORE members failed to persuade the owners to hire Black clerks, so they picketed outside for five weeks.

She initiated the "Rebels Remembered" project to compile a history of the civil rights movement in Denver. She wanted to ensure that high school students would be able to access this local history and make sure it would not be lost.

Denny was the first Black woman to serve as a Deacon at the Montview Presbyterian Church in 1964. Earlier, she was a member of Peoples Presbyterian Church, where she was the Assistant Superintendent of Sunday School.

== Marriage and children ==
Denny's first husband was Eugene Ambrose Briscoe, and they had two children: Michael Eugene Briscoe and Dianne Louise Briscoe.

Her second husband was Galloway H. Denny, and they were married until his death in 1987.

== Death and afterward ==
Denny died on October 9, 2012, in Denver.

== Recognition ==
Denny received the following awards:

- Humanitarian Award from the Colorado Martin Luther King Holiday Commission (1995)
- Service to the Community award from the Shaka Franklin Foundation (2006)
- Trailblazer Award from the Annual Martin Luther King Jr. Social Responsibility Awards (2010)
- Blacks in Colorado Hall of Fame
- Colorado Women's Hall of Fame (2022)

== See also ==
- Congress of Racial Equality
- Denver Public Schools
