= 1994 Colorado gubernatorial election =

- November 8, 1994
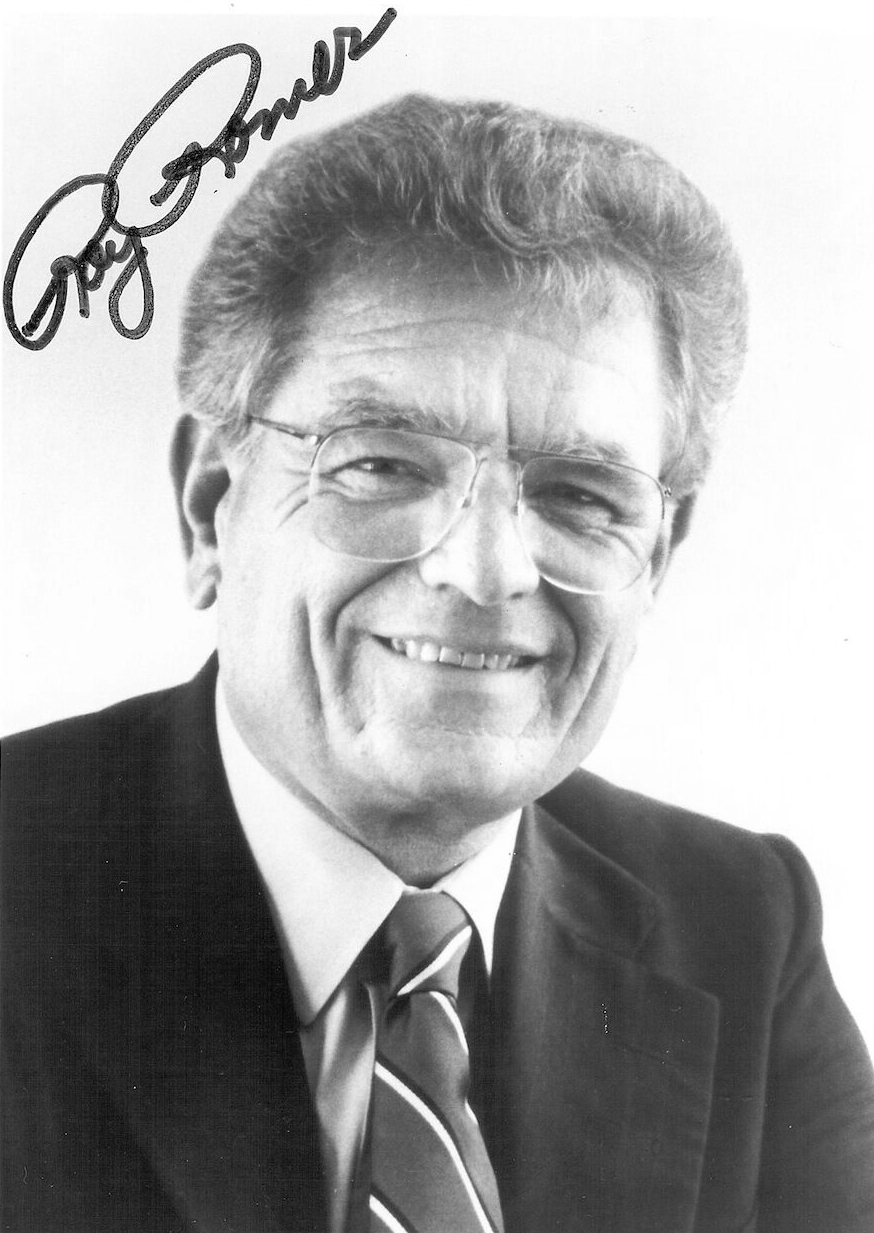

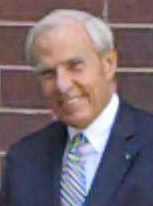
Nominee	Roy Romer	Bruce D. Benson
Party	Democratic	Republican
Running mate	Gail Schoettler	Bob Schaeffer
Popular vote	619,205	432,042
Percentage	55.47%	38.70%
- County results Romer: 40–50% 50–60% 60–70% 70–80% Benson: 40–50% 50–60% 60–70% 70–80%
Governor before election
Roy Romer
Democratic
Elected Governor
Roy Romer
Democratic

The 1994 Colorado gubernatorial election was held on November 8, 1994, to select the governor of the state of Colorado. Although Colorado voters passed a term limits ballot measure in 1990 limiting the governors to two consecutive terms, it was not retroactive and only applied for terms beginning in 1991 or later, thus Roy Romer, the Democratic incumbent first elected in 1986, was able to run for reelection for a third term. The Republican nominee, Chairman of the Colorado Republican Party, Bruce D. Benson, lost by a margin of nearly 18 percent.

This election coincided with the Republican Revolution of 1994.

== Democratic primary ==
Incumbent governor Roy Romer ran unopposed in the Democratic primary.

Democratic primary results
Party	Candidate	Votes	%
Democratic	Roy Romer (incumbent)	68,722	100.00

== Republican primary ==
- Bruce D. Benson, Chairman of the Colorado Republican Party
- Mike Bird
- Dick Sargent
- George P. Carouthen (write-in)

Republican primary results
Party	Candidate	Votes	%
Republican	Bruce D. Benson	103,979	60.0%
Republican	Mike Bird	38,577	22.3%
Republican	Dick Sargent	30,332	17.5%
Republican	George P. Carouthen (write-in)	410	0.2%
Total votes		173,298	100.00

== General election ==
Colorado gubernatorial election, 1994
Party	Candidate	Votes	%	±%
Democratic	Roy Romer (incumbent)	619,205	55.47%	−6.42%
Republican	Bruce D. Benson	432,042	38.70%	+3.27%
Constitution	Kevin Swanson	40,397	3.62%	N/A
Green	Philip Hufford	16,956	1.52%	N/A
Prohibition	Earl Dodge	7,584	0.68%	−0.10%
Write-in	Thomas Todd	123	0.01%	N/A
Majority		187,163	16.77%	−9.69%
Turnout		1,116,307		
Democratic hold		Swing		
