= B. LaRae Orullian =

American banker, executive and former president of Girl Scouts of the USA

Bessie LaRae Orullian (born May 13, 1933) is an American banker, executive, and former president of Girl Scouts of the USA. She is commonly referred to as B. LaRae Orullian or LaRae Orullian. Gained national attention as the founding president and CEO of the Women’s Bank of Denver, a nationally chartered bank, majority-owned and run by women, that opened in 1978. The bank provided financial services to women in the Denver area whose access had continued to lag behind men, despite federal laws such as the Equal Credit Opportunity Act of 1974.

== Biography ==
B. LaRae Orullian was born on May 13, 1933, in Salt Lake City, Utah. After graduating high school, she got a job as a bank messenger, then coin wrapper, then file clerk and was eventually promoted within the company to loan processor. She subsequently decided she wanted to be a banker on Wall Street and headed east, but once she reached Denver, she stayed there.

In Denver, she was hired as a secretary at Guaranty Bank and Trust Company, and was again quickly promoted. She wanted the job of bank officer, which at that time was a job only for men, so she spent 14 years going to night school to get three certificates from the American Banker's Society. Then she went to Ohio State University Graduate School of Banking to study real estate finance. After this, she returned to Guaranty Bank and again moved up the ranks. During this time, she trained new bank presidents and regularly performed duties of acting president, so at one point, she asked the board president why he didn't give her the job of bank president. He said it was because Denver wasn't ready for a woman bank president and because she didn't have grey hair. She eventually worked her way up to vice president, but was still required to make coffee for the all-male board of directors.

Orullian was the founding president and CEO of the Women's Bank of Denver, and served in those roles from 1977 to 1997. The bank was established to serve the banking needs of women, and was the second women's bank in the country to receive a national charter. Many banks did not allow women to take out loans without signatures of their husbands, which prevented women from opening businesses or taking out loans. The first 12 weeks the bank was open, it took $12 million in deposits. The bank made its initial investment back within its first 10 months being open. She left to accept the position of vice chairman of the Guaranty Bank board of directors.

Orullian was a part of a Denver women's group that called themselves "The Velvet Hammer." The women in the group would speak to male CEOs to ask them why women weren't on their board of directors, then would present those men with resumes of qualified women.

== Awards and recognition ==
In 1983, she was named Savvy Magazine's top 20 corporate women. According to the editor of the magazine, Wendy Reid Crisp, Orullian and her colleagues were nominated because "we believe them to be the front-runners for chief executive officer".

Orullian was inducted into the Colorado Women's Hall of Fame in 1988.

Orullian has been on or led boards of many companies, including Frontier Airlines and WellPoint Financial (Anthem Inc.). She served as First Vice Chair of the World Board (World Association of Girl Guides and Girl Scouts), based in London, England, and she served as National President and Chair of the Girl Scouts of the USA.

In 1994, she wrote an article for the Chicago Tribune entitled "Girl Scouts Make A Promise To Include All" which announced that Girl Scouts would allow members to substitute the word "God" in the Girl Scout Law for "a word for God that more closely expresses their personal spiritual beliefs."

In 2004, she was awarded an honorary Doctor of Humane Letters (L.H.D.) degree from Whittier College, in Whittier, California.
