= Zipporah Parks Hammond =

First Black graduate from a nursing program in Colorado)

- Born: March 1, 1924; Denver, Colorado
- Died: July 6, 2011 (age 87); Longmont, Colorado
- Occupations: Nurse, librarian, philanthropist
- Spouse: Sheldon Hammond
- Children: Stephen and Darrell Hammond
- Parent(s): William Edward Parks and Zipporah Marcella Joseph

Zipporah Parks Hammond (1924–2011) was the University of Colorado College of Nursing's first African-American graduate and the first Black Director of Medical Records in Colorado. She was a humanitarian, philanthropist, and civil-rights champion in Colorado.

== Early life ==
Zipporah "Zippy" Parks Hammond was born March 1, 1924, in Denver, Colorado, as the only child of William Edward Parks and Zipporah Marcella Joseph. She is a descendant of William Syphax and Maria Carter Syphax through her mother. Her mother was the first Black woman valedictorian at a Denver public high school. She died when Zipporah was 10 years old, and her illness and the community support they received influenced Zipporah's choice to be a nurse.

She attended Denver's Whittier Elementary, Morey Junior High, and Manual Training High Schools.

== Career ==
Parks was accepted into the University of Colorado School of Nursing in 1941, and was the first Black person to graduate from a nursing program in Colorado. She faced racist obstructions like being excluded from living on campus, prevented from studying with white students, and denied hands-on learning.

She joined the Cadet Nurse Corps when it was established in 1943, where she was the only Black nurse out of 1600 student nurses.

Her first position after graduating was as a surgical operating-room nurse at Colorado General Hospital.

After one year, she was recruited by Dr. John Chenault to be the Chief Surgical Nurse at the Tuskegee Institute in Alabama as part of the Infantile Polio Paralysis Unit of the Andrew Memorial Hospital. In this role, she cared for young Black patients with polio who could not receive treatment at other hospitals because of their skin color, and she established medical-treatment protocols for the disease.

Zipporah contracted tuberculosis in 1947 and returned to Denver, ending her career as a nurse. She was hospitalized at National Jewish Health.

She received her medical records librarian certification from CU in 1951. She became Director of Medical Records at Presbyterian/St. Luke's medical center. She was the first Black woman to hold this leadership position in Colorado. She taught and mentored over 200 medical students and professionals during this time. In 1956, she left her leadership position to raise her two sons.

Hammond was involved in the local Denver community. She volunteered with Denver Public Library for 17 years by preserving and indexing materials from Five Points, Denver. She donated to dozens of charitable organizations such as Mental Health American of Colorado, the Colorado Coalition for the Homeless, Denver Rescue Mission, Senior Support Services, Friends of Manual High School, Gathering Place a Place for Women, Alzheimer's Research and more.

== Marriage and children ==
Zipporah met Sheldon Hammond as she was hospitalized for tuberculosis. Hammond was also a TB patient. They married in 1952. They had two sons, Stephen and Darrell.

== Death and afterward ==
Hammond died on July 6, 2011, at age 87.

== Recognition ==
- Zipporah Parks Hammond Memorial Nursing Scholarship.
- Inducted into Blacks in Colorado Hall of Fame in 2022.
- CU College of Nursing Alumni Association - Pathfinders Award of Black women in Denver.
- University of Colorado College of Nursing - Diversity Leadership Award in 2004.
- "Living Legend Award" in March 2009 from her peers of Black women in Denver.
- Honored at the Women in Military Service for America Memorial.
- Colorado Women's Hall of Fame in 2022

== See also ==
- Blacks in Colorado Hall of Fame
- National Black Nurses Association
