= Gail Schoettler =

American politician

44th Lieutenant Governor of Colorado
- In office January 3, 1995 – January 12, 1999
- Governor: Roy Romer
- Preceded by: Samuel Cassidy
- Succeeded by: Joe Rogers

50th Treasurer of Colorado
- In office January 3, 1987 – January 3, 1995
- Governor: Roy Romer
- Preceded by: Roy Romer
- Succeeded by: Bill Owens

Personal details
- Born: Gail Sinton; October 21, 1943 (age 82) Los Angeles, California, U.S.
- Party: Democratic
- Spouses: John Schoettler (div. 1988); Donald Stevens (m. 1990)
- Children: 5 (including 2 stepchildren)
- Education: Stanford University (BA); University of California, Santa Barbara (MA, PhD)

Gail Schoettler (/ʃɛtlɜːr/, née Sinton; born October 21, 1943) is a retired American politician and businesswoman who served as the 44th Lieutenant Governor of Colorado and 50th Colorado State Treasurer. In the 1998 gubernatorial election, Schoettler was the Democratic nominee for Governor of Colorado, losing to Republican Bill Owens.

== Early life and education ==
Schoettler was born Gail Sinton in Los Angeles, California on October 21, 1943. Schoettler's father was a cattle rancher and member of the Shandon school board. Schoettler has a brother and twin sister. Schoettler grew up on a cattle ranch in Shandon, California.

In 1965, Schoettler earned a Bachelor of Art degree in economics from Stanford University. Schoettler earned a master's degree and PhD degree in African History from University of California, Santa Barbara.

== Career ==
Schoettler became a research assistant for an African Studies professor at University of Denver's Graduate School of International Studies, earning $2.50 an hour.

In 1975, Schoettler co-founded and became the President of the Denver Children's Museum in Denver, Colorado, until 1985. In the same year, Schoettler co-founded Women's Bank of Denver.

=== Politics ===
In 1979, Schoettler became a member of Board of Education in Douglas County, Colorado. Schoettler served until 1987. In 1983, Schoettler became an executive director of the Colorado Department of Personnel,

On November 4, 1986, Schoettler became the 50th Colorado State Treasurer. Schoettler defeated Dick Sargent and Joseph M. Nelson with 51.60% of the votes. On November 6, 1990, as an incumbent, Schoettler won the election and continued serving as Treasurer of Colorado. Schoettler defeated Dick Sargent and Karen Thiessen with 53.74% of the votes.

In 1994, Schoettler was elected Lieutenant Governor of Colorado as the running mate of Roy Romer. On November 3, 1998, Schoettler lost the election as the Democratic nominee for Governor of Colorado. Schoettler was defeated by Bill Owens with 48.43% of the votes. Schoettler was defeated by 7,783 votes.

=== Post-government career ===
Schoettler and Judi Wagner started a women's group that would raise money to support women candidates. Schoettler cofounded Electing Women and Electing Women Alliance. In 1999, Schoettler was appointed as the U.S. Ambassador of 2000 World Radiocommunication Conference, hosted in Istanbul, Turkey. Schoettler is the owner of eGlobalEducation, a travel company.

== Personal life ==
At 21 years old, Schoettler married John Schoettler, a geologist, and they moved to Santa Barbara, California. In 1969, the Schoettlers moved to Colorado. The couple divorced in 1988, and in 1990, Gail Schoettler married Dr. Donald Stevens, Dean of the University of Colorado at Denver College of Business. Schoettler has three children and two step-children, and as of 1998 lives in Parker, Colorado.

== See also ==
- List of female lieutenant governors in the United States
- 1998 Colorado gubernatorial election

Political offices
Preceded by Roy Romer	Treasurer of Colorado; 1987–1995	Succeeded by Bill Owens
Preceded by Samuel Cassidy	Lieutenant Governor of Colorado; 1995–1999	Succeeded by Joe Rogers
Party political offices
Preceded by Roy Romer	Democratic nominee for Governor of Colorado; 1998	Succeeded by Rollie Heath
