= Jennie Mae Rucker =

Black librarian in Denver

- Born: December 29, 1922; Texas
- Died: September 7, 2018 (aged 95); Denver, Colorado
- Occupations: Librarian and educator
- Spouse: George Webster Rucker
- Children: George Rucker

Dr. Jennie Mae Rucker (née Walker, 1922 – 2018) was a librarian and educator in Denver, Colorado. She was one of the founding faculty of the Community College of Denver, and was inducted into the Blacks in Colorado Hall of Fame.

== Biography ==
Jennie Mae Walker was born in Texas in 1922. She had three siblings, Louis, Bertha, and Alma. Her family moved to Denver's west side and she graduated from West High School.

Rucker had a variety of jobs before becoming a librarian. From 1941 to 1960, she was a legal secretary, medical secretary, and medical transcriber. Rucker worked as an educational secretary and substitute teacher at Denver Public Schools from 1953 to 1979.

Rucker earned her Bachelor's degree in 1970 and Master's degree in the Graduate School of Librarianship in 1973, both from the University of Denver. She earned her Doctor of Education in 1978 from University of Northern Colorado. She was a postdoctoral fellow from 1978 to 1981 from Colorado State University.

She was a founding faculty member at the Community College of Denver when it opened in 1967. She retired from the Community College of Denver in 1992, and moved to the Denver Public Library's Ford-Warren branch, where she worked until 1997.

Rucker sat on the board of Colorado Historical Society.

She was a philanthropist and traveled to Africa and South America to build schools and finance education.

=== Personal life ===
Rucker was known for her vocal performances. She performed with the National Negro Opera Company, Denver Post Opera Company, Denver Civic Chorus, and Washington, D.C. Civic Chorus. She performed with the Denver Spirituals Project, and is a lead vocalist on "Swing low, sweet chariot."

She married George Webster Rucker on December 20, 1947, who was the first Black graduate from CU-Boulder's pharmacy school. He went on to open Rucker's Drug Store. The couple had one son, George, in 1959.

=== Death and legacy ===
Rucker died on September 7, 2018, in Denver, Colorado.

Denver Public Library's Blair Caldwell African American Research Library has a collection of her family papers, which includes legal documents, correspondence, and photographs.

== Recognition ==
- 2014, Distinguished Educator of the Year
- 2019, Blacks in Colorado Hall of Fame
