= Colorado Model Content Standards =

The Colorado Model Content Standards were a set of curriculum standards for teaching civics, dance, economics, foreign language, geography, history, mathematics, music, physical education, reading and writing, science, theatre, and visual arts.

Of the 13 standards only three (mathematics, reading and writing, and science) were testing subjects included in the CSAP. The standards were replaced by the Colorado Academic Standards in 2011.
