= Gay, Oklahoma =

Unincorporated community in Oklahoma, US

- Unincorporated community
- Location within the state of Oklahoma Gay (the United States)
- Coordinates: 33°57′12″N 95°37′17″W
- Country: United States
- State: Oklahoma
- County: Choctaw
- Elevation: 443 ft (135 m)
- Time zone: UTC-6 (Central (CST))
  - Summer (DST): UTC-5 (CDT)
- GNIS feature ID: 1093152

Gay is an unincorporated community in Choctaw County, Oklahoma, United States.

== History ==
A post office was established at Lenton, Indian Territory on October 22, 1901. Its name changed to Gay, Oklahoma on April 28, 1908. The post office closed on December 31, 1932.

The community is said to have been named after the town of Gay, Georgia.

At the time it was founded, Lenton, later Gay, was located in Kiamitia County, a part of the Apukshunnubbee District of the Choctaw Nation.

== Notable person ==
- Pauline Short Robinson (1915–1997), first African-American librarian in Denver, Colorado
