= James "Dr. Daddio" Walker =

Black radio host in Denver, CO (1939-2026)

- Born: April 24, 1939
- Died: January 26, 2026 (aged 86); Denver, CO
- Occupation: Radio personality

James "Dr. Daddio" Walker (April 24, 1939 – January 26, 2026) was a Denver-based radio DJ and civil rights icon. He was the first Black person to own a radio station west of Kansas City, and helped the Five Points neighborhood become "Harlem of the West." He was known for the slogan "unity in the community."

== Biography ==
Walker was a social worker before he became a radio host. He worked in Missouri and Louisiana before coming to Colorado.

He worked at KDKO AM 1510 in Englewood, which was a country music station until Walker started playing soul music. The new style launched on April 1, 1967, and became the first station in Colorado that served the Black community.

In 1989 with 17 investors, Walker purchased the radio station and moved from Englewood to Five Points. The station became a mix of music and talk radio, and Walker used the platform to lift Black voices and provide broadcasting experience through internships. He shared information about events that other white mainstream broadcasters ignored.

=== Death and legacy ===
Walker died on January 26, 2026 in Denver, Colorado.

== Published works ==
- Walker, James Daddio. Radio in my Soul : The Journey of James “Dr. Daddio” Walker. Dalayo Publishing, 2022.ISBN 979-8987179222

== Recognition ==
In 2008, Walker was inducted into the Blacks in Colorado Hall of Fame.
