= Emily H. Womach =

American banker (1927-2018)

- Born: January 27, 1927; Laurel, Delaware
- Died: May 29, 2018 (aged 91); Gaithersburg, Maryland
- Spouse: William S. Womach (1943–1982)

Emily Hitch Womach (January 27, 1927 – May 29, 2018) was an American banker from the state of Delaware. Womach served as Delaware State Treasurer from 1971–1973 and ran as a Democrat for governor of Delaware in 1972. Womach was the founding President and Chair of the Board of Directors of the Women's National Bank in Washington D.C., the first federally chartered bank in the United States to be owned and managed by women. President Jimmy Carter appointed Womach to the President’s Commission on Executive Exchange in 1980.

== Family and personal life ==
Womach was born Emily Jeanette Hitch to Elon Gardner Hitch and Jennie Kerry in Laurel, Delaware on January 27, 1927. She was the oldest of four children. She graduated from Laurel High School in Delaware and obtained additional education as a working adult from Salisbury Business Institute, Northwestern University School of Financial Public Relations, American Institute of Banking, and the Stonier Graduate School of Banking at Rutgers University.

She married William S. Womach in 1943. Their only child William Richard Womach, known as "Dick", was born in 1944. Womach began working for the local bank in Laurel, Delaware while her husband served in the military overseas during World War II. She continued to work in banking after the war. Her husband William became an officer in the Delaware State Police. In addition to employment and raising their son, the two were involved in raising poultry and cattle.

Womach was an active participant in the social and civic life of her community. She volunteered for numerous organizations and served on many boards over the years including the Laurel Chapter of the Muscular Dystrophy Association, Delmarva Poultry Industry Association, the Delaware State Bank Advisory Board, the National Small Business Advisory Council, and the Business & Development Committee of Washington D.C. She was a member of the Order of the Eastern Star, a Masonic appendant body open to both men and women.

Womach's husband William was killed in a car accident in October 1982. Womach was also seriously injured in the accident and found herself unable to return to work. She resigned from her post as President and Chair of the Board of Directors at the Women's National Bank in Washington, D.C. in March 1983.

== Banking career ==
Womach began her banking career in 1945 as a bookkeeper at the Sussex Trust Co. in Laurel, Delaware. She advanced in roles and responsibilities during her 23 years at the bank to become vice president and corporate secretary.

She served as the President of the National Association of Bank Women in 1963–1964.

In 1976, Womach was Vice President at the Farmers Bank of Delaware when she was persuaded to taken on the founding of a new women's bank in Washington, D.C. The Women's National Bank was chartered in 1977 with the purpose of integrating women both as owners and customers into its daily operation. The Women's National Bank was part of broader movement women's banks aimed at making financial services and credit more accessible to women customers. The bank invested in the financial literacy of its clients through regular brown bag lunches and seminars focused on topics of interest to women.

Womach oversaw the bank's charter, stock offering, and official opening on May 23, 1978. Within a year, the Women's National Bank began posting profits. Womach led the bank’s operations and board of directors until March 1983 when injuries from a car accident prompted her resignation.

== Government and civil service ==
In 1968, Woman became an administrative assistant to Delaware governor Charles L. Terry, Jr. She was elected to the office of state treasurer in 1970, the third woman in the state of Delaware to hold the position. In 1972 Womach ran for governor in the Democratic primary election, losing to Sherman W. Tribbitt who went on to win the general election.

President Jimmy Carter appointed Womach to the President's Commission on Executive Exchange in 1980 during her tenure as President and Chair of the Board of Directors of the Woman's National Bank in Washington D.C.
