= Emily Card =

American political scientist (born 1942)

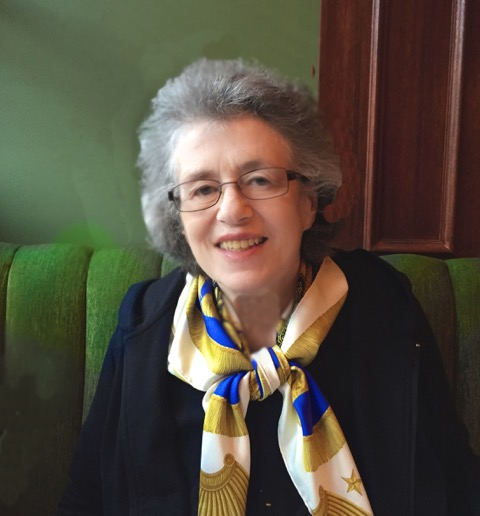
- Born: May 8, 1942
- Alma mater: Harvard University; Tulane University; Columbia University
- Occupation: Television personality, teacher, writer
- Works: Equal Credit Opportunity Act

Emily Watts Card (born May 8, 1942) is an American political scientist, educator, and author in women's consumer credit and finance. As a legislative fellow under Republican Senator Bill Brock of Tennessee, Card gathered evidence, drafted legislation, and coordinated support for the Equal Credit Opportunity Act of 1974.

== Family and education ==
Born Emily Ann Watts on May 8, 1942, to Ray Dean Watts and Anne America Dempsey. Card graduated from Chattanooga High School in Chattanooga, Tennessee in 1960. She earned a B.A. from Newcomb College in 1963 and an M.A. in Political Science from Tulane University in 1966. Card completed a Ph.D. in Political Science at Columbia University in 1972 with a dissertation titled The Politics of Underdevelopment; from Voluntary Associations to Party Auxiliaries in Ghana. Card went on to earn an M.P.A. from the Harvard Kennedy School in 1981 and holds a J.D. from the University of California Los Angeles.

== Career ==
Card was the director and founder of the Women's Credit and Finance Project at Harvard University. She has authored, co-authored, or contributed to seven books and was a contributing editor to Ms. Magazine. In the 1980s she hosted the television show It's Your Money. For many years Card combined her legal and financial backgrounds as the principal of a financial advisory service based in Santa Monica, California. She was an assistant professor of political science at the University of Wisconsin–Green Bay for a time. In May 1974, she ran as a Democrat for California's 31st congressional district in the United States House of Representatives. By 1979, Card was a professor at the University of Southern California and director of USC's Planning Institute.

== Involvement in the Equal Credit Opportunity Act of 1974 ==
After completing her Ph.D. at Columbia University, Card became a legislative fellow with Senator Bill Brock of Tennessee. Card's own experience in being denied a credit card and home mortgage fueled her desire to work on legislation prohibiting discrimination in granting credit to women. Senator Brock served on both the National Commission on Consumer Finance and the Senate Banking Committee, but he and others had to be convinced that a problem existed before supporting federal legislation to address the discrimination. Card coordinated with women's organizations (including the National Organization of Women) to compile a report on gender-based discrimination in the banking industry that was supported by thousands of letters from women throughout the United States who had been denied credit. The Equal Credit Opportunity Act was signed into law on October 28, 1974.

== Publications ==
- Staying Solvent: A Comprehensive Guide to Equal Credit for Women (1985). ISBN 978-0-03-062954-9
- The Ms. Money Book (1991). ISBN 978-0-525-24669-5
- The Single Parent's Money Guide (1996) with Christie Watts Kelly, ISBN 978-0-02-861119-8
- Business Capital for Women: The Essential Handbook for Entrepreneurs (1996) with Adam L. Miller, ISBN 978-0-02-860854-9
- Managing Your Inheritance: Getting It, Keeping It, Growing It—Making the Most of Any Size Inheritance (1997) with Adam L. Miller, ISBN 978-0-8129-2600-2
- New Families, New Finances: Money Skills for Today's Nontraditional Families (1998) with Christie Watts Kelly, ISBN 978-0-471-19612-9
- Also contributed to Consumer Reports Complete Guide to Managing Your Money (1989) and The Consumer Reports Money Book (1995 & 1997)

== Collections ==
Dr. Emily Card's papers are part of the Newcomb College Archives at Tulane University.
