= 1998 Colorado gubernatorial election =

- November 3, 1998
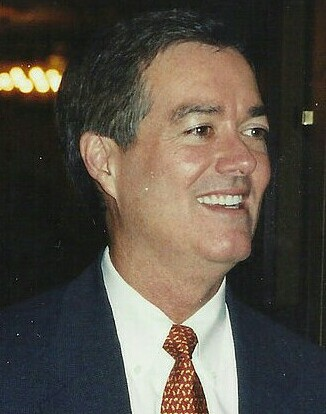

Nominee	Bill Owens	Gail Schoettler
Party	Republican	Democratic
Running mate	Joe Rogers	Bernie Buescher
Popular vote	648,202	639,905
Percentage	49.04%	48.42%
- County results Owens: 40–50% 50–60% 60–70% Schoettler: 40–50% 50–60% 60–70%
Governor before election
Roy Romer
Democratic
Elected Governor
Bill Owens
Republican

The 1998 Colorado gubernatorial election was held on November 3, 1998 to elect the governor of Colorado. Under newly applicable term limits, Democratic incumbent Roy Romer was unable to seek re-election. In the open race to succeed him, Colorado treasurer Bill Owens defeated lieutenant governor Gail Schoettler.

Schoettler won the Democratic primary over Colorado Senate minority leader Mike Feeley. In the Republican primary, Owens defeated Senate president Tom Norton by a relatively wide margin. This was the last election in which Colorado held separate primary elections for governor and lieutenant governor; following a statutory change in 2000, candidates selected running mates prior to the primary.

In the general election, Owens narrowly defeated Schoettler, aided by a strong performance by U.S. senator Ben Nighthorse Campbell in his re-election campaign. Owens's narrow election meant that he was the first Republican governor in 24 years. His running mate Joe Rogers became the second African American lieutenant governor in the state's history after George L. Brown.

== Democratic primary ==
=== Governor ===
==== Candidates ====
- Gail Schoettler, lieutenant governor of Colorado
- Mike Feeley, Colorado Senate minority leader

==== Results ====
Democratic primary results
Party	Candidate	Votes	%
Democratic	Gail Schoettler	80,038	55.51
Democratic	Mike Feeley	64,034	44.41
Democratic	Write-ins	125	0.09
Total votes		144,191	100.00

=== Lieutenant governor ===
==== Candidates ====
- Bernie Buescher, former executive director of the Colorado Department of Health Care Policy and Financing

==== Results ====
Democratic primary results
Party	Candidate	Votes	%
Democratic	Bernie Buescher	111,786	99.68
Democratic	Write-ins	355	0.32
Total votes		112,141	100.00

== Republican primary ==
=== Governor ===
==== Candidates ====
- Bill Owens, Colorado state treasurer
- Tom Norton, president of the Colorado Senate

==== Results ====
Republican primary results
Party	Candidate	Votes	%
Republican	Bill Owens	126,816	59.20
Republican	Tom Norton	87,214	40.71
Republican	Write-ins	186	0.09
Total votes		214,216	100.00

=== Lieutenant governor ===
==== Candidates ====
- Joe Rogers, former chief counsel to U.S. senator Hank Brown and 1996 nominee for Colorado's 1st congressional district
- Jim Congrove, state senator

==== Results ====
Republican primary results
Party	Candidate	Votes	%
Republican	Joe Rogers	109,781	57.72
Republican	Jim Congrove	80,246	42.19
Republican	Write-ins	173	0.09
Total votes		190,200	100.00

== General election ==
=== Candidates ===
- Sandra D. Johnson (Libertarian)
- Tim Leonard (Constitution)
- Bill Owens, Colorado state treasurer (Republican)
- Gail Schoettler, lieutenant governor of Colorado (Democratic)

=== Polling ===
Poll source	Date(s) administered	Sample size (Note: Key: A – all adults RV – registered voters LV – likely voters V – unclear)	Margin of error	Gail Schoettler (D)	Bill Owens (R)	Other / undecided (Note: Calculated by taking the difference of 100% and all other candidates combined.)
Ciruli Associates (Note: Poll sponsored by 9News, KOA Radio, and The Denver Post)	October 30, 1998	500 (LV)	± 4.4%	42%	46%	12%
Ciruli Associates	October 29, 1998	500 (LV)	± 4.4%	41%	45%	14%
Mason-Dixon Polling & Strategy	October 26–28, 1998	831 (LV)	± 3.5%	41%	45%	15%
Ciruli Associates	October 27, 1998	500 (LV)	± 4.4%	40%	46%	14%
Ciruli Associates	October 26, 1998	500 (LV)	± 4.4%	42%	45%	13%
Ciruli Associates	October 25, 1998	500 (LV)	± 4.4%	41%	45%	14%
Ciruli Associates	October 22, 1998	500 (LV)	± 4.4%	41%	47%	12%
Ciruli Associates	October 19–22, 1998	400 (RV)	± 5.0%	41%	47%	12%
Harris Insights & Analytics	October 20, 1998	614	—	46%	43%	11%
Public Opinion Strategies	October 16, 1998	500	—	39%	43%	18%
Mason-Dixon Polling & Strategy	October 9–12, 1998	804 (LV)	± 3.5%	39%	44%	17%
Ciruli Associates	October 1–10, 1998	(LV)	± .%	40%	40%	20%
Mason-Dixon Polling & Strategy	July 27–29, 1998	849 (LV)	± 3.4%	36%	38%	26%

=== Results ===
1998 Colorado gubernatorial election
Party	Candidate	Votes	%	±%
Republican	Bill Owens	645,806	49.04%	+10.36%
Democratic	Gail Schoettler	637,655	48.42%	−7.05%
Libertarian	Sandra D. Johnson	22,150	1.68%	–
Constitution	Tim Leonard	10,966	0.83%	−2.79%
Majority		8,151	0.62%	−16.15%
Turnout		1,316,939		
Republican gain from Democratic		Swing		

==== By county ====
County	Bill Owens Republican		Gail Schoettler Democratic		Various candidates Other parties		Margin		Total votes cast
County	#	%	#	%	#	%	#	%	Total votes cast
Adams	37,195	44.85%	43,462	52.41%	2,271	2.74%	6,267	-7.56%	82,915
Alamosa	2,611	49.00%	2,396	48.73%	104	2.13%	215	0.27%	4,916
Arapahoe	76,996	51.57%	69,278	46.40%	3,015	2.03%	7,718	5.17%	149,278
Archuleta	2,088	63.02%	1,093	32.99%	132	3.99%	995	30.03%	3,313
Baca	1,240	62.09%	706	35.35%	51	2.56%	534	26.74%	1,997
Bent	1,036	52.50%	907	45.97%	30	1.53%	129	6.53%	1,973
Boulder	39,487	37.48%	63,185	59.97%	2,686	2.55%	-23,698	-22.49%	105,353
Chaffee	3,146	51.36%	2,843	46.41%	136	2.23%	303	4.95%	6,125
Cheyenne	809	69.44%	323	27.72%	33	2.84%	486	41.72%	1,165
Clear Creek	1,786	46.07%	1,936	49.94%	155	3.99%	-150	-3.87%	3,876
Conejos	1,719	48.61%	1,742	49.26%	75	2.13%	-23	-0.65%	3,536
Costilla	469	31.22%	975	64.91%	58	3.87%	-506	-33.69%	1,502
Crowley	761	58.80%	506	39.10%	27	2.10%	255	19.70%	1,294
Custer	1,049	67.45%	454	29.19%	52	3.36%	595	38.26%	1,555
Delta	5,921	60.66%	3,547	36.34%	292	3.00%	2,374	24.32%	9,760
Denver	52,109	31.77%	103,540	63.13%	8,346	5.10%	-51,431	-31.36%	163,995
Dolores	418	52.64%	345	43.45%	31	3.91%	73	9.19%	794
Douglas	33,167	62.69%	18,919	35.76%	819	1.55%	14,248	26.93%	52,905
Eagle	4,123	44.50%	4,874	52.60%	268	2.90%	-751	-8.10%	9,265
El Paso	86,037	61.21%	50,199	35.71%	4,322	3.08%	35,838	25.50%	140,558
Elbert	4,296	64.33%	2,178	32.61%	204	3.06%	2,118	31.72%	6,678
Fremont	7,318	57.46%	5,105	40.08%	311	2.46%	2,213	17.38%	12,734
Garfield	5,534	45.20%	5,937	48.50%	770	6.30%	-403	-3.30%	12,241
Gilpin	750	43.42%	887	51.36%	90	5.22%	-137	-7.94%	1,727
Grand	2,209	52.35%	1,867	44.25%	143	3.40%	342	8.10%	4,219
Gunnison	1,818	34.52%	3,211	60.97%	237	4.51%	-1,393	-26.45%	5,266
Hinsdale	227	55.77%	168	41.27%	12	2.96%	59	14.50%	407
Huerfano	1,016	40.07%	1,474	58.14%	45	1.79%	-458	-18.07%	2,535
Jackson	494	62.92%	261	33.24%	30	3.84%	233	29.68%	785
Jefferson	94,387	50.26%	88,561	47.16%	4,820	2.58%	5,826	3.10%	187,768
Kiowa	645	66.35%	312	32.09%	15	1.56%	333	34.26%	972
Kit Carson	2,079	64.82%	1,077	33.58%	51	1.60%	1,002	31.24%	3,207
La Plata	4,198	44.18%	4,965	52.25%	338	3.57%	-767	-8.07%	9,501
Lake	838	36.05%	1,385	59.59%	101	4.36%	-547	-23.54%	2,324
Larimer	44,069	51.81%	38,920	45.76%	2,059	2.43%	5,149	6.05%	85,048
Las Animas	1,969	40.20%	2,809	57.36%	119	2.44%	-840	-17.16%	4,897
Lincoln	1,298	64.70%	683	34.04%	25	1.26%	615	30.66%	2,006
Logan	3,903	58.04%	2,697	40.11%	124	1.85%	1,206	17.93%	6,724
Mesa	21,534	53.96%	17,248	43.22%	1,120	2.82%	4,286	10.74%	39,902
Mineral	211	47.84%	213	48.29%	17	3.87%	-2	-0.45%	441
Moffat	2,669	61.51%	1,555	35.83%	115	2.66%	1,114	25.68%	4,339
Montezuma	4,217	56.73%	3,020	40.62%	196	2.65%	1,197	16.53%	7,433
Montrose	6,437	59.34%	4,136	38.13%	274	2.53%	2,301	21.21%	10,847
Morgan	4,562	55.91%	3,441	42.17%	156	1.92%	1,121	13.74%	8,159
Otero	3,254	56.07%	2,620	41.89%	127	2.04%	634	14.18%	6,254
Ouray	812	55.01%	617	41.80%	47	3.19%	195	13.21%	1,476
Park	2,771	55.66%	2,006	40.29%	201	4.05%	765	15.37%	4,978
Phillips	1,256	62.54%	714	35.55%	38	1.91%	542	26.99%	2,008
Pitkin	1,526	28.33%	3,659	67.94%	200	3.73%	-2,133	-39.61%	5,385
Prowers	2,562	60.25%	1,643	38.64%	47	1.11%	919	21.61%	4,252
Pueblo	18,924	41.56%	25,878	56.83%	726	1.61%	-6,954	-15.27%	45,528
Rio Blanco	1,737	66.75%	798	30.66%	67	2.59%	939	36.09%	2,602
Rio Grande	2,623	56.32%	1,935	41.55%	99	2.13%	688	14.77%	4,657
Routt	2,786	41.61%	3,697	55.22%	211	3.17%	-911	-13.61%	6,694
Saguache	916	41.59%	1,196	54.31%	90	4.10%	-280	-12.72%	2,202
San Juan	149	46.41%	151	47.04%	21	6.55%	-2	-0.63%	321
San Miguel	714	31.70%	1,417	62.92%	121	5.38%	-703	-31.22%	2,252
Sedgwick	672	54.32%	544	43.90%	23	1.78%	128	10.42%	1,239
Summit	2,595	40.35%	3,630	56.45%	205	3.20%	-1,035	-16.10%	6,430
Teller	4,200	62.79%	2,275	34.01%	213	3.20%	1,925	28.78%	6,688
Washington	1,109	66.20%	509	30.38%	57	3.42%	600	35.82%	1,675
Weld	25,480	54.89%	19,977	43.03%	958	2.08%	5,503	11.86%	46,415
Yuma	2,421	61.18%	1,452	36.69%	84	2.13%	969	24.49%	3,957
Total	645,806	49.04%	637,655	48.42%	33,116	2.54%	8,151	0.62%	1,316,577

Counties that flipped from Republican to Democratic

- San Juan

Counties that flipped from Democratic to Republican

- Bent
- Chaffee
- Douglas
- Alamosa
- Larimer
- Grand
- Jefferson
- Logan
- Morgan
- Arapahoe
- Mesa
- Phillips
- Prowers
- Weld
- Sedgwick
- Yuma
- Otero

== Notes ==
Partisan clients
