= Colorado Student Assessment Program =

Standardized test in Colorado, United States

The Colorado Student Assessment Program (CSAP) was an assessment required by the No Child Left Behind Act administered by the Unit of Student Assessment in the Colorado Department of Education (CDE). The CSAP was designed to measure how well students are learning material from the Colorado Model Content Standards, the established content standards that all Colorado public school students should learn. The CSAP only tested four (mathematics, reading and writing, and science) of the thirteen subject areas in the Colorado Model Content Standards.

== Administration ==
Starting in 3rd Grade, and continuing until 10th Grade (Sophomore year of High School), all students were expected to take their grade level's version of the CSAP, testing for which typically occurred during the Spring semester from early February to late March. All grades were tested in Reading, Writing, and Math, and only 5th, 8th, and 10th graders are tested in Science. The 3rd and 4th Grade versions of the CSAP are also available in Spanish to accommodate the high number of Spanish-speaking students in Colorado public schools who concurrently learn English. In 11th Grade (Junior year of High School) students were required to take the COACT (a Colorado specific version of the ACT) in place of the CSAP. The COACT is also administered by the Unit of Student Assessment.

== Assessment ==
CSAP was graded on a scale of four proficiency/performance levels. Level 4 is referred to as "advanced," level 3 as "proficient," level 2 as "partially proficient," and level 1 as "unsatisfactory." The Colorado Department of Education website details their standards for each level on each test, and how each score is determined.

Schools are rated by the averaged CSAP scores of their students. Low-scoring schools are eligible for School Improvement Plan assistance from the Colorado Department of Education. If a school receives an unsatisfactory rating (level 1) for two consecutive years it will be recommended it be turned into a charter school—unless it had an improvement of 0.5 of a point greater from the standard deviation over the immediately preceding year's overall standardized, weighted total score. Schools with three consecutive unsatisfactory ratings will be converted into charter schools. School districts with consistently low-scoring schools can lose their accreditation.

=== Exceptions ===
According to C.R.S. 22-7-409, schools are held accountable for the scores of all their students with three exceptions: (1) students transferring into the school after October 1, (2) students whose dominant language is not English for the first three years enrolled in Colorado public schools, (3) for any students taking the Colorado Student Assessment Program Alternate (CSAPA) instead of the CSAP. The CSAPA was a version of the CSAP test for students who met certain eligibility requirements, primarily students with disabilities.

All School Improvement Plans must address the requirements in the No Child Left Behind Act Section 1116(a)(3)(A). Schools needing additional funding can apply for a Federal Title I A School Improvement Grant. The Colorado Department of Education provides a How-To document for this purpose on their website.

=== Funding implications ===
The No Child Left Behind Act has several other Federal Programs that Colorado schools can petition for aid if they qualify. In addition to the Title I A grant these programs include: Title I C - Migrant Education, Title I D - help for Neglected and delinquent children, Title II B - math and science partnership grants, Title II D - grants for changing education through technology, Title III - Language instruction for Limited-English Students, Title IV - Safe and Drug Free Schools, Title V A - Innovative Programs, Title V B - Public Charter Schools, and Title VI B - Rural Education Initiative.

However, most Colorado LEAs (Local Educational Associations, e.g. Schools and School Districts) submit a Consolidated Federal Programs Application yearly which covers applications for Title I A, Title II A, Title II D, Title III, Title IV, Title V, and Title VI B programs.

Funds received from these programs are distributed through the CDE to LEAs, and the amounts awarded for each State and Federal grant are published on the CDE website.

== Relationship to other assessments ==
In addition to the CSAP, Colorado is also subject to the same requirements as the rest of the United States in the No Child Left Behind Act. The Colorado Department of Education's plans to make Adequate Yearly Progress (AYP) are published on their website. Results from the CSAP, CSAPA, and graduations rates are used to create AYP calculations for Colorado school districts. The Unit of Student Assessment also administers the National Assessment of Educational Progress (NAEP) to Colorado public school students.

If a school is receiving a Title I grant and does not meet all the requirements of their AYP for two consecutive years in the same content area the school must create a School Improvement Plan. The school district is also required to provide transportation for students from the school not meeting their AYP to a higher performing school in the same district.

== Replacement by TCAP ==
The Colorado Student Assessment Program ended in year 2011 due to the expiration of its contract. The CSAP testing regiment has been replaced by the Colorado TCAP, or Transitional Colorado Assessment Program. This test had similar areas and format of examination, starting in the 2012 school year.

Some teachers and parents found the required testing to be overly burdensome for students. As guest Denver Post opinion columnist Brian Kurz argued students spend more time taking CSAP then law students do taking the BAR exam. The replacement TCAP met a similar fate as many districts and families have grown weary of over-testing students.
