= Pauline Short Robinson =

African-American librarian and civil rights activist

- Robinson in Hawai'i 1958
- Born: Pauline Short; 1915; Gay, Oklahoma
- Died: 1997 (aged 81–82); Denver, Colorado
- Education: B.S. library science, University of Denver, 1943
- Occupation: Librarian
- Years active: 1945–1979
- Employer: Denver Public Library
- Known for: First African-American librarian in Denver, Colorado

Pauline Short Robinson (1915–1997) was an American librarian and civil rights activist. She was the first African American to be hired as a librarian in the city of Denver, Colorado. During her 36-year career with the Denver Public Library system, she worked in several branches and served as Coordinator of Children Services for 15 years. In 1996 the Denver Public Library named a newly built branch in Northeast Park Hill in her honor. She was posthumously inducted into the Colorado Women's Hall of Fame in 2000.

== Early life ==
Pauline Short was born in Gay, Oklahoma, in 1915. Her grandfather taught her to read before she entered grade school. After completing high school in Lawton, she moved to Denver, Colorado, with plans to study law, but was unable to pursue a degree due to the high cost of education. Living with her aunts, she studied at the Emily Griffith Opportunity School and worked as a domestic to cover her expenses.

Short also took a job at the Community Vocational Center Library in Five Points, where Denver's African-American community was concentrated. This library received books discarded by the Denver Public Library system. As it could not afford to acquire books on African-American heritage and history, Short launched a fund-raiser in which she sold 150 home-baked pies and raised $40 to purchase new volumes. She also solicited funds from local businesses to help the library purchase subscriptions to African-American newspapers and periodicals.

Buoyed by her experience reading with young patrons of the library, Short considered going into teaching. She enrolled at the University of Denver on a half-tuition scholarship in 1935 to study education, but found out from a professor that the Denver Public Schools system restricted African Americans to teaching kindergarten and first-grade only. She switched her major to library science, earning her B.S. degree in 1943.

She married in 1940. After earning her university degree, she left Denver with her husband, who was serving in the army; they returned in 1945.

== Library career ==
Upon her return to Denver, Robinson discovered that the Community Vocational Center Library was in dire shape. The reading program had been discontinued, library patronage had dropped, and the Denver Public Library was planning to shutter the facility. Robinson and local school principals lobbied for a new library. The Denver Public Library responded by building a new Cosmopolitan Branch Library in Five Points in 1945 and appointed Robinson as librarian. Robinson became the first African-American librarian in the city. By 1950, the city census recorded eight black librarians in Denver.

During her library career, Robinson worked in several branches of the Denver Public Library. In 1964 she was named Coordinator of Children Services for the library system, a position she held for 15 years. She supervised the annual summer reading program for the Denver Public Library and also assisted in the writing of a grant that brought the Reading is Fundamental literacy program to the city. She retired in 1979.

== Civil rights activism ==
Robinson was a civil rights activist beginning in her college days, when she was an NAACP "freedom activist". She played a part in the integration of the Lakeside Amusement Park in Lakeside, Colorado. She scheduled the first Negro History Week at the New Hope Baptist Church; this commemoration was the predecessor for Black History Month in Denver.

== Honors and awards ==
Robinson was present at the 1996 dedication of a newly built branch of the Denver Public Library which was named in her honor. Located in the Northeast Park Hill neighborhood, the branch became part of the revitalization of Holly Square, offering popular programs such as the After School is Cool arts and crafts program for 8- to 12-year-olds, and the Pauline Robinson Book Club.

Robinson was inducted into the Blacks in Colorado Hall of Fame in 1973. She was posthumously inducted into the Colorado Women's Hall of Fame in 2000.

== Sources ==
- Hansen, Moya B. (2008), "'Try Being a Black Woman!'", in Taylor, Quintard; Moore, Shirley Ann Wilson (eds.), African American Women Confront the West, 1600–2000 (Reprint ed.), University of Oklahoma Press, p. 217, ISBN 978-0806139791
