= Arie Parks Taylor =

American politician

Arie Parks Taylor (March 27, 1927- September 27, 2003) was the first African American woman to become a Women's Air Force classroom instructor and officer and the first African-American woman elected to the Colorado State House of Representatives.

== Early life and education ==
Taylor was born Arie Mae Parks in Bedford, Ohio and was one of eleven children. Her mother died in childbirth after which she helped to care for her siblings.

Taylor graduated from Bedford High School and attended Miami University in Ohio for two years before graduating from Case Western Reserve University in 1951. While in college, she worked for Jean Capers, the first African American woman on the Cleveland City Council.

== Career ==
=== Women's Air Force ===
Taylor joined the Women's Air Force (WAF) after college graduation. She served as a staff administrator and ultimately became the WAF's first African American officer and classroom instructor. She met and married William Taylor while serving in the WAF.

Taylor was honorably discharged after four years of service after which she accepted an offer to work full-time for Jean Capers.

=== Politics ===
In 1958, Taylor divorced William and moved to Denver where she worked as a hospital administrator. She enrolled in accounting classes at University of Colorado and accepted a job with an accounting firm after graduation.

Taylor joined the Northeast Denver Democrats shortly after arriving in Denver. She was named Chief Clerk for the Denver Election Commission in 1965 and was a Colorado delegate to the 1968 Democratic National Convention.

In 1972, Taylor won a seat in the Colorado House of Representatives making her Colorado's first female African American representative.
