= John Mosley =

American football player and bomber pilot (1921–2015)

Lt. Col. John W. Mosley
- Born: June 21, 1921; Denver, Colorado, U.S.
- Died: May 22, 2015 (aged 93)
- Education: Colorado State University
- Spouse: Edna Wilson-Mosley

John William Mosley Jr. (June 21, 1921 – May 22, 2015) was an American football player and combat bomber pilot in the United States Army Air Forces. He served as a Tuskegee Airmen. Mosley was the first African American to play on the Colorado State University football team. He also became one of the first African Americans to be trained as a bomber pilot during World War II.

== Early life and education (1921–1943) ==
Born June 21, 1921, in Denver, Colorado, John William Mosley was the son of a Cripple Creek silver rush settler. He spent his early educational career at Whittier Elementary School, Cole Junior High School, and Manual Training High School. While attending Manual, he played football and wrestled. He was also the valedictorian, and earned the National Merit Scholarship.

John W. Mosley enrolled at the Agricultural College of Colorado (now Colorado State University) in 1939. At the time the college had only eight African American students, none of whom were allowed to live on campus. Mosley later joined the football team under coach Harry W. Hughes in 1940, and became the first African American on the football team at Colorado State University in Fort Collins in the record keeping era. He often faced discrimination from his white teammates. For example, during try-outs some players purposefully hit him very hard to discourage him from joining the team. He did, however win several players over, making two very good friends in Dude Dent and Woody Fries. In the same year Mosley expressed an interest in wrestling, and also joined the wrestling team under coach Julius Wagner. By joining the team, Mosley became the first African American wrestler at Colorado State University. He also became the first African American to earn an athletic letter in Colorado State University football team history. Additionally, he broke the color barriers off the field when he was elected class vice president in both his junior and senior years. In 2024 CSU retired his jersey number 14 across all sports, and added his name and number to a display in Canvas Stadium.

== Career (1943–1970) ==
While he was at college, Mosley had an interest in becoming a pilot, paying for his own flight lessons and physical exam. Mosley received a physical in Denver and was diagnosed with a heart murmur, which he believed to be false. Mosley wanted to join the Tuskegee Airmen after he graduated from college. After graduation, Mosley was drafted into a segregated Army Artillery unit stationed at Fort Sill, Oklahoma. While at Fort Sill, he began to write many letters to command and Washington, D.C. requesting to be reassigned to the Tuskegee Airmen. Eventually, these letters resulted in his reassignment. He trained as a bomber pilot, one of the first African Americans to do so. He served with distinction in World War II and earned the rank of Command Pilot. He chose to return to the states as a civilian in 1946 to earn his master's degree in Social Work from the University of Denver in 1948. Soon afterwards he returned to the service and fought in the Korean and Vietnam Wars, where he also earned the rank of Lieutenant Colonel. Mosley also flew during the Berlin Airlift. He finally retired from the United States Air Force in 1967. After retirement from the Air Force he moved on to the U.S. Department of Health and Human Services (HHS).

Mosley was a strong activist. During his time as a Tuskegee airmen, he was advocating for his rights and others to serve in the armed forces. His role was to integrate the military and armed forces through the civil rights activities that took place in the United States. Mosley used his motivation and determination to fight for integration in the Armed forces. People would ask him why he wasn't bitter about his rights in the Armed forces. Mosley was a part of a movement to prove that he was capable of making a contribution to the development of our great nation. After being in the Tuskegee Airmen, John Mosley joined the Federal government to continue being a civil rights activist.

He later married his high school friend Edna Wilson-Mosley, a prominent politician, civil rights activist, and educator. Both of them remained active in a number of professional and community organizations to help the African American community gain equal rights. John Mosley served as a special assistant to the undersecretary in the Department of Health and Human Services when he and his wife moved to Aurora Colorado and was transferred to the Lowry Air Force Base. His wife became the first African American lady to become a city councilwomen in Aurora. He worked in a variety of positions including Equal Opportunity Specialist, Staff Director of the Mountain Plains Federal Regional Council and Special Assistant to James Farmer, Assistant Secretary of Administration.

== Legacy ==
=== John Mosley Student-Athlete Leadership Program ===
At Colorado State University, many refer to John Mosley as the Jackie Robinson of CSU athletics. In 1998 Mosley was inducted into the CSU Sports Hall of Fame, and in 2009 he was admitted into the Colorado Sports Hall of Fame.

Through a collaboration between CSU's Athletics department and the university's Black/African American Cultural Center, the John Mosley Mentoring Program was established during the 2011–2012 academic year at Colorado State University. The goals of the mentoring program are "to reduce the percentage of academic probation rates, to increase retention rates to matriculation, [and] expose [student-athletes] to positive African-American role models who have been through the rigors of academic achievement as a student-athlete and who have earned their degree". While mentorship remains an essential component to the success of the program, the program underwent a name change in 2014, becoming the John Mosley Leadership Program (JMLP). The four guiding principles of the JMLP are a) self-exploration. b) community engagement, c) transitional growth and leadership, and d) mentorship.

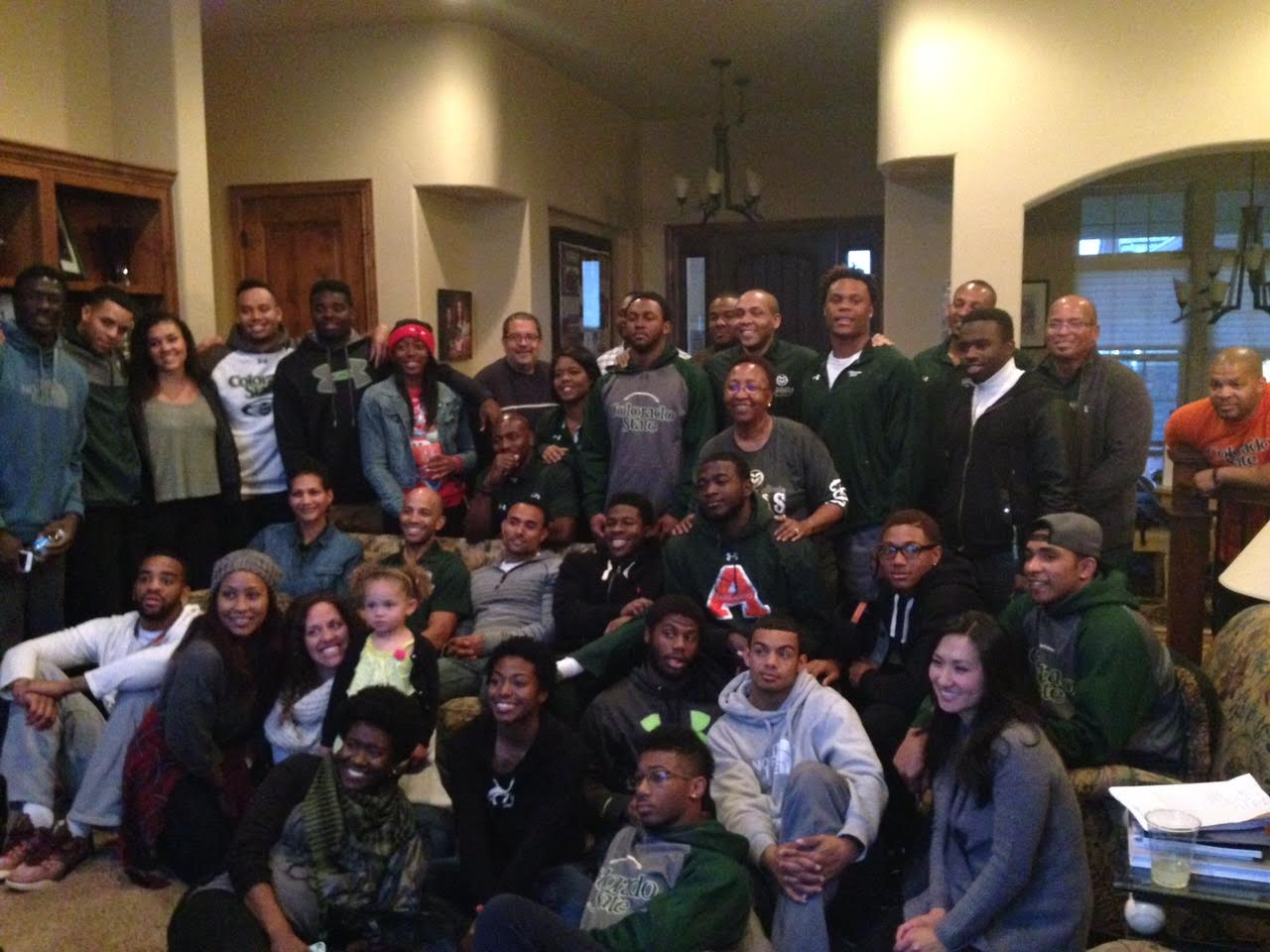
A gathering of the JMLP. Those pictured include: Dr. Blanche Hughes (CSU Vice President of Student Affairs) as well as Dr. Albert Bimper Albert Bimper (Senior Associate Athletic Director for Diversity, Inclusion, & Engagement at CSU).

Mosley received numerous awards such as the Anti-Defamation League Torch of Liberty award, an honorary doctorate from CSU as well as the Congressional Gold Medal by then President Bush. In 2021, the Aurora, Colorado office of the Department of Veterans Affairs outpatient clinic was renamed the Lieutenant Colonel John W. Mosley Clinic by an act of the U.S. Congress.

=== Mile High Flight Program Tuskegee Airmen Inc. ===
During the second World War, John W. Mosley tried to join the air camp of the United States Tuskegee Airmen. Mosley and his flight crew gave motivational tendencies to young minorities.

=== John and Edna Mosley Scholarship Fund ===
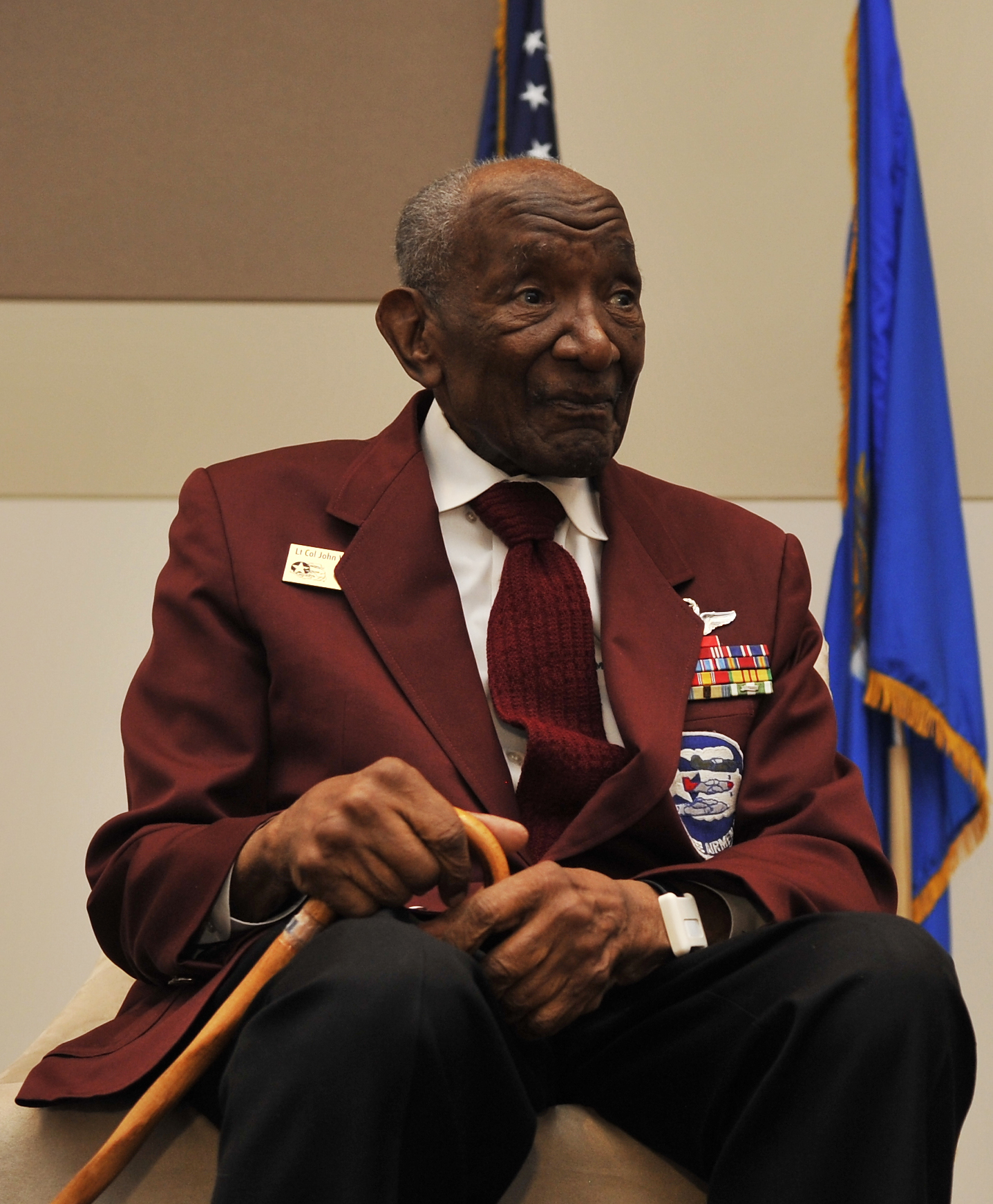
Mosley at Buckley AFB in 2011.

After years of serving the community, friends and community members raised money to present to the Mosley's to allow them to go on vacation abroad to enjoy themselves. The community raised thousands of dollars to honor and show thanks to the Mosley's philanthropy throughout the years. The Mosley's instead had a different plan for this money: they agreed to accept the money raised, if only they could start a scholarship fund with it, instead of a vacation for themselves. Since its start in 2002 this scholarship fund has helped numerous African American students from the Denver-Metro area, equaling in $28,000 worth of scholarship dollars given to the recipients. The requirements for this scholarship include: one must be African American, have a desire to further their education in a University, College or another accredited post-secondary school and must have accumulated a GPA of 2.5 of higher. This scholarship fund looks for students who take charge of their lives to better them, such as maintaining good grades and having leadership roles. Once the finalist are accepted the scholarship board will then hold interviews to ensure that the Mosley scholarship is awarded to the perfect candidate to honor the Mosley's. This scholarship fund is now the largest and oldest community fund in the entire state of Colorado. Following his death, the Mosley family asked the public to please not send the family flowers, but instead donate a dollar to his scholarship fund to honor one of his life goals to help African American students achieve their full potential in post-secondary education.

=== Edna and John W. Mosley Elementary School ===
Due to the impact that John W. Mosley as well as his wife Edna had in the Aurora Community, Aurora's Mayor, Steve Hogan, decided to dedicate a school to the individuals. The school, Edna and John W. Mosley P-8, opened on October 1, 2015, near Airport Boulevard and 2nd Avenue in Aurora, Colorado. Currently, it is occupying more than 900 students.

== See also ==
- Dogfights (TV series)
- Executive Order 9981
- Freeman Field Mutiny
- List of Tuskegee Airmen
- Military history of African Americans
- The Tuskegee Airmen (movie)
