= Women's National Bank (Washington, D.C.) =

American banking company

- Industry: Financial services
- Founded: 1977
- Headquarters: 1627 K Street N.W., Washington, D.C, U.S.
- Products: Credit cards; Mortgages; Personal loans; Commercial banking; Lines of credit
- Website: adamsbank.com

The Women's National Bank in Washington, D.C. was the first nationally chartered women's bank in the United States. It was incorporated in 1977, after the passage of the Equal Credit Opportunity Act. It was also the "first women's bank to become a member of the Federal Reserve System". Its first president was Emily H. Womach."

The bank was proposed in 1974, and was initially denied a charter in 1976.

It changed its name to The Adams National Bank in 1986. Adams National Bank was acquired by Premier Financial Bancorp in West Virginia, changing its name to Premier Bank in 2011.
