= Equal Credit Opportunity Act =

United States anti-discrimination law

Equal Credit Opportunity Act of 1974
- Long title: An Act to require full disclosure by domestic branches of foreign banks, to regulate holding companies, and to amend the Federal Deposit Insurance Act, the Federal Reserve Act, and the Federal Home Loan Bank Act, and for other purposes.
- Acronyms (colloquial): ECOA
- Nicknames: Title V of the Depository Institutions Amendments of 1974
- Enacted by: the [[the 93rd United States Congress United States Congress]]
- Effective: October 28, 1975

Citations
- Public law: Pub. L. 93–495
- Statutes at Large: 88 Stat. 1500

Codification
- Acts amended: Federal Deposit Insurance Act, Consumer Credit Protection Act
- Titles amended: 15 U.S.C. ch. 41
- U.S.C. sections created: 15 U.S.C. § 1691 et seq.

Legislative history
- Introduced in the the House of Representatives as H.R. 11221 by Fernand St. Germain (D–RI) on October 31, 1973; Committee consideration by House Committee on Banking and Currency; Passed the United States House of Representatives on February 5, 1974 (282–94); Passed the United States Senate on June 13, 1974 (89–0); Reported by the joint conference committee on October 9, 1974; agreed to by the United States House of Representatives on October 9, 1974 (355–1) and by the United States Senate on October 10, 1974 (Passed by voice vote); Signed into law by President Gerald Ford on October 28, 1974

Major amendments
- Equal Credit Opportunity Act Amendments of 1976 (Pub. L. 94–239)

United States Supreme Court cases
- Hawkins v. Community Bank of Raymore, No. 14-520, 577 U.S. ___ (2016)

The Equal Credit Opportunity Act (ECOA) is a United States law (codified at 15 U.S.C. § 1691 et seq.), enacted October 28, 1974, that makes it unlawful for any creditor to discriminate against any applicant, with respect to any aspect of a credit transaction, on the basis of race, color, religion, national origin, sex, marital status, or age (provided the applicant has the capacity to contract); the applicant's use of a public assistance program to receive all or part of their income; or the applicant's previous good-faith exercise of any right under the Consumer Credit Protection Act. The law applies to any person who, in the ordinary course of business, regularly participates in a credit decision, including banks, retailers, bank card companies, finance companies, and credit unions.

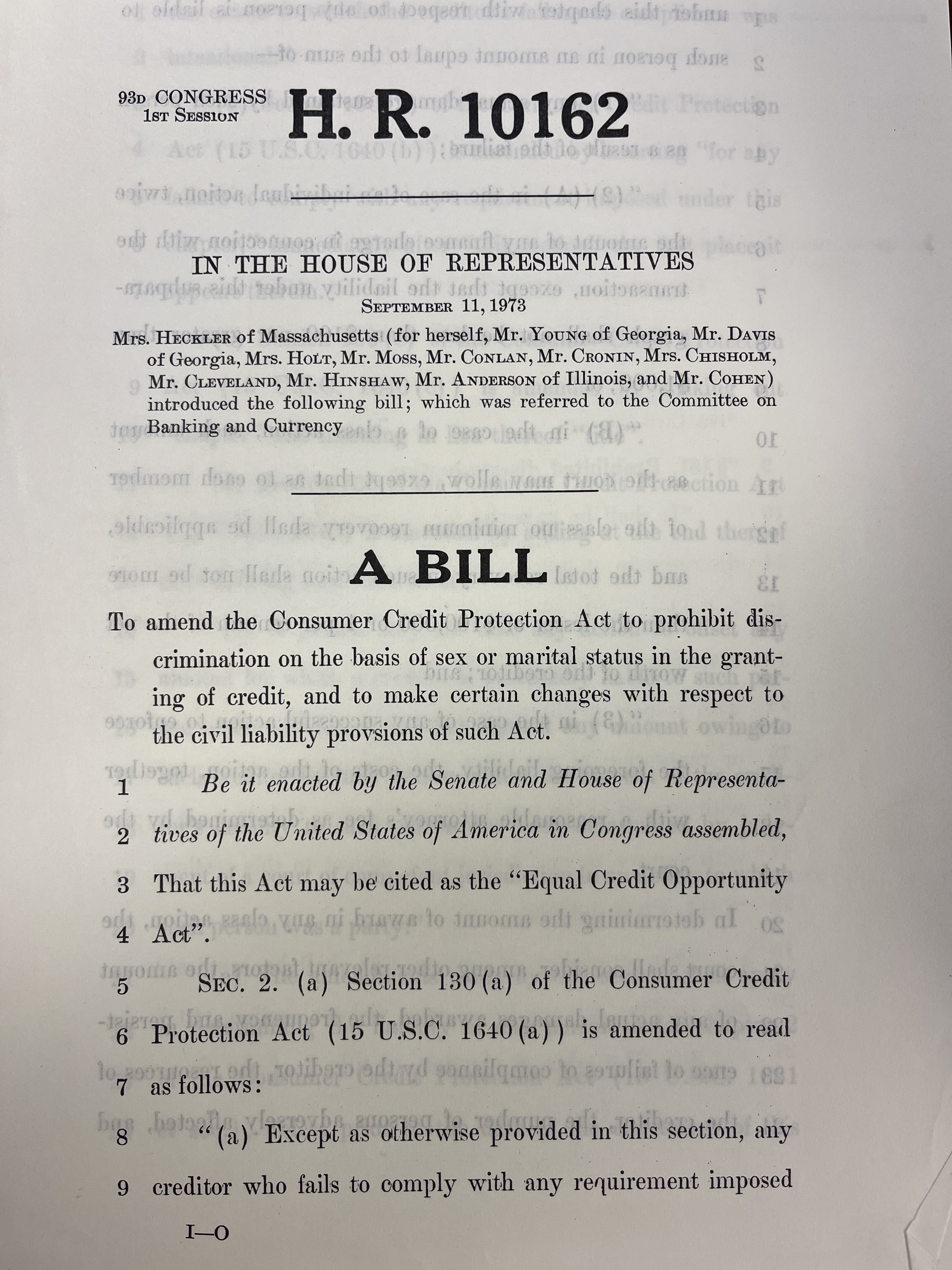
Equal Credit Opportunity Act

The part of the law that defines its authority and scope is known as Regulation B, from the (b) that appears in Title 12 part 1002's official identifier: 12 C.F.R. § 1002.1(b) (2017). Failure to comply with Regulation B can subject a financial institution to civil liability for actual and punitive damages in individual or class actions. Liability for punitive damages can be as much as $10,000 in individual actions and the lesser of $500,000 or 1% of the creditor's net worth in class actions.

Before the enactment of the law, lenders and the federal government frequently and explicitly discriminated against female loan applicants and held female applicants to different standards from male applicants. A large coalition of women's and civil rights groups pressured the government to pass the ECOA (and the Housing and Community Development Act of 1974) to prohibit such discrimination.

== Background ==
In 1967, when Margaret Heckler was the only newly elected woman in the 90th Congress, she came in as a lawyer and a congresswoman with no right to credit in her own name. She joined the House Committee on Banking and Currency with a determination to ensure that women were granted economic justice and fair treatment under the law. In 1968, she was one of only 11 women in Congress, and one of only two women to serve on the committee where any legislation regarding women's credit would need to be discussed.

Heckler arranged a meeting with CEOs of several major banks, such as J.P. Morgan, Chase, and Wells Fargo, to discuss their hesitancy to extend credit to women. Financial institutions were worried that women would not pay their bills, but a female Mastercard executive helped allay their concerns. Heckler continued to dispel this fear of women not being credit worthy, assuring the banking executives that they could approve and deny female applicants based on credit eligibility, just as they did with men.

Heckler then drafted the Equal Credit Opportunity Act of 1974. According to Heckler's chief of staff Edmund Rice, "The work in the Banking Committee, the work in the House, the work to find the allies—all of this Margaret Heckler had the lead on; others were there rhetorically. But all the hard work was Margaret Heckler."

As a legislative fellow with Senator Bill Brock of Tennessee, Dr. Emily Card was motivated by her own experience in being denied a credit card and home mortgage. This led her to work on legislation prohibiting discrimination in granting credit to women. Her work and coordination with women's organizations such as the National Organization of Women generated a report on gender-based discrimination in the banking industry that was supported by thousands of letters from women throughout the United States who had been denied credit.

== Provisions ==
=== Prohibitions ===
Among other things, the ECOA states that it is illegal for creditors to:

- Discriminate based on race, sex, age, national origin, or marital status, or because one receives public assistance.
- Ask about marital status if a candidate is applying for separate, unsecured credit, with one exception: one can be asked about marital status if one lives in a community property state. No matter what the state of residence is, joint credit (credit shared by a married couple) or credit secured with property is exempt from this.
- Ask the candidate if they plan to have children or additional children (though creditors can ask about the number, ages, and financial obligations relating to all existing children).
- Disallow regular sources of income, such as reliable veteran's benefits, welfare payments, Social Security payments, alimony, child support, etc. Nor may they refuse to consider or discount any income earned from a part-time job, pension, annuity, or retirement benefits program.

=== Requirements ===
The ECOA states that creditors must:

- Provide the applicant with a notification of action taken within 30 calendar days of receiving a completed application, unless certain exceptions apply. These notifications of action taken are sometimes required to be in writing, while in other cases, oral notification satisfies the Regulation's requirement.
- Give the specific reason(s) (or let the candidate know how to get the reason(s)) why one is denied credit or granted credit in a way different from the terms under which they originally applied. This same rule applies if a creditor closes the account, refuses to increase a line of credit, makes a negative change in the terms of the credit and doesn't make the same change for other consumers, or refuses to give credit at the same, or approximately the same, terms as were offered when the credit was initially applied for.

=== Scope additions ===
When the Banking committee marked up the ECOA, congresswoman Lindy Boggs added the provision banning discrimination due to sex or marital status without informing the other members of the committee beforehand, personally inserting the language on her own and photocopying new versions of the bill. She then told the other committee members, "Knowing the members composing this committee as well as I do, I'm sure it was just an oversight that we didn't have 'sex' or 'marital status' included. I've taken care of that, and I trust it meets with the committee's approval." The committee unanimously approved the bill.

== Amendments and regulatory development ==
=== 1976 amendments ===
The original 1974 law prohibited discrimination based only on sex and marital status. In March 1976, Congress amended the law to add prohibitions on discrimination based on race, color, religion, national origin, age, and receipt of public assistance income.

=== Transfer of authority to CFPB ===
The Dodd-Frank Wall Street Reform and Consumer Protection Act of 2010 transferred rulemaking authority for ECOA from the Federal Reserve Board to the newly created Consumer Financial Protection Bureau (CFPB). The CFPB now writes and enforces regulations implementing ECOA, known as Regulation B (12 C.F.R. Part 1002). The CFPB shares enforcement responsibility with other federal agencies including the Federal Trade Commission, the Office of the Comptroller of the Currency, the Federal Deposit Insurance Corporation, and the National Credit Union Administration, depending on the type of creditor involved.

=== Section 1071 small business lending data ===
Section 1071 of the Dodd-Frank Act amended ECOA by adding Section 704B (15 U.S.C. § 1691c-2), which requires financial institutions to collect and report data on credit applications by women-owned, minority-owned, and small businesses. The CFPB finalized rules implementing Section 1071 in March 2023, though implementation has been subject to ongoing litigation.

=== 2026 final rule amending Regulation B ===
On April 22, 2026, the CFPB published a final rule amending Subpart A of Regulation B. The rule, which takes effect July 21, 2026, makes three significant changes to the regulatory implementation of ECOA.

First, the rule removes the "effects test" from Regulation B and states that ECOA does not authorize disparate-impact liability. The CFPB's position is that ECOA's prohibition on discrimination "on the basis of" protected characteristics is intent-focused and does not contain the effects-oriented language present in statutes such as the Fair Housing Act and the Age Discrimination in Employment Act, where the Supreme Court has recognized disparate-impact liability. The rule preserves disparate-treatment liability, including claims based on facially neutral criteria used as proxies for protected characteristics. The change reverses a longstanding interpretation that dated to the Federal Reserve Board's 1977 amendment of Regulation B.

Second, the rule narrows the prohibition on discouraging prospective applicants under § 1002.4(b). The discouragement analysis is now limited to oral or written statements (including images) that a reasonable person would understand as expressing an intent to discriminate, rather than statements or practices that merely create negative impressions or have indirect discouraging effects. Targeted outreach to specific demographic groups is expressly not treated as discouragement of those outside the targeted group.

Third, the rule restricts special purpose credit programs operated by for-profit creditors. For-profit SPCPs may no longer use race, color, national origin, or sex as eligibility criteria. For-profit SPCPs using other permissible characteristics (religion, marital status, age, receipt of public assistance income, or exercise of Consumer Credit Protection Act rights) face heightened documentation requirements, including a written plan demonstrating need and participant-level evidence that each participant would not receive credit absent the program. Nonprofit and government-authorized SPCPs are largely unaffected.

The CFPB received approximately 64,500 comments on the proposed rule and finalized it largely as proposed. Consumer advocacy groups, state attorneys general, and members of Congress signaled during the comment period that the rule would be challenged in court on Administrative Procedure Act and statutory-interpretation grounds. The rule's effect on disparate-impact liability is limited to ECOA enforcement; the Fair Housing Act, state anti-discrimination statutes, and private ECOA litigation in courts that have not foreclosed disparate-impact theories remain available avenues for effects-based claims.

== Impact and implementation (1974–1980) ==
Although the Equal Credit Opportunity Act (ECOA) made sex- and marital-status-based credit discrimination unlawful in 1974 and was expanded in 1976 to cover additional protected bases, early implementation did not immediately erase entrenched practices in the retail credit and mortgage markets. Contemporary accounts and later syntheses note that many lenders continued, for a period, to require male co-signers from women applicants or to discount women’s income in mortgage underwriting, especially for married women of “childbearing age,” despite the statute’s prohibitions and Regulation B’s implementing rules. (Note: These practices were often informal or justified as “custom,” which made them harder to detect and litigate in the immediate post‑ECOA years.)

Regulators continued to clarify ECOA’s scope through Regulation B and related guidance, emphasizing that discrimination is prohibited with respect to any aspect of a credit transaction, that creditors must notify applicants of adverse action, and that certain data‑collection, appraisal, and record‑retention requirements apply. The Consumer Financial Protection Bureau and the Federal Reserve maintain the current text and official interpretations of Regulation B (12 C.F.R. part 1002/part 202).

In parallel with regulatory implementation, the 1970s also saw the emergence of “women’s banks,” commercial institutions founded to ensure nondiscriminatory access to credit and to provide financial education. One of the most visible examples was the Women’s Bank of Denver (opened July 14, 1978), launched by a network of business leaders who argued that, notwithstanding ECOA, many women still encountered de facto barriers in mainstream lending. Historians and archival sources describe these banks as both practical responses to persistent market frictions and symbolic catalysts that helped normalize nondiscriminatory underwriting in retail banking.

Over time, ECOA and Regulation B have been updated and reinterpreted to address evolving practices, including appraisal disclosures, monitoring information for certain dwelling‑related loans, and special‑purpose credit programs. Current rulemakings and corrections to proposed rules continue to refine provisions on discouragement, evaluation of applications, and program design.

== Enforcement ==
=== Department of Justice referrals ===
Federal regulatory agencies are required to refer matters to the Department of Justice when they have reason to believe a creditor has engaged in a pattern or practice of lending discrimination in violation of ECOA. DOJ referrals from banking regulators and the CFPB increased from 12 in 2020 to 33 in 2023, a 175% increase. In 2023, the CFPB alone referred 18 matters to DOJ involving alleged discrimination based on race, national origin, receipt of public assistance, sex, and age.

=== Combating Redlining Initiative ===
In October 2021, Attorney General Merrick Garland announced the Combating Redlining Initiative (also referred to as the Combatting Redlining Initiative in some cases), a coordinated enforcement effort between DOJ, the CFPB, federal banking regulators, and state attorneys general to address redlining under both ECOA and the Fair Housing Act. By late 2023, the initiative had secured more than $107 million in settlements from financial institutions accused of failing to provide mortgage lending services to majority-Black and Hispanic neighborhoods.

Major settlements under the initiative included Trident Mortgage Company ($22.4 million, 2022), City National Bank of Los Angeles ($31 million, 2023), Park National Bank ($9 million, 2023), Lakeland Bank ($12 million, 2022), and Ameris Bank ($9 million, 2023).

=== Recent enforcement actions ===
In addition to redlining cases, agencies have brought ECOA enforcement actions for other discriminatory practices. In 2022, the Federal Trade Commission and the State of Illinois brought an action against Napleton, a multistate auto dealer group, for alleged ECOA violations including discrimination in auto lending. In 2023, the CFPB ordered Bank of America to pay a $12 million civil penalty for HMDA violations related to failing to properly collect applicants' demographic information.

== CFPB v. Townstone Financial ==
A significant legal question regarding ECOA's scope was addressed in Consumer Financial Protection Bureau v. Townstone Financial, Inc. The CFPB filed suit in 2020 alleging that Townstone, a Chicago mortgage lender, violated ECOA by making statements on a radio program and podcast that would discourage Black prospective applicants from applying for mortgage loans.

The district court dismissed the case in February 2023, holding that ECOA's protections apply only to "applicants" who have actually applied for credit, not to prospective applicants who might be discouraged from applying.

On July 11, 2024, the Seventh Circuit Court of Appeals reversed in a unanimous decision, holding that ECOA authorizes liability for discouraging prospective applicants. The court found that "when the text of the ECOA is read as a whole, it is clear that Congress authorized the imposition of liability for the discouragement of prospective applicants." The court noted that other ECOA provisions refer to "discouraging" applications, and that the statute prohibits discrimination "with respect to any aspect of a credit transaction," which includes pre-application conduct.

The decision was notable as one of the first significant fair lending rulings following the Supreme Court's decision in Loper Bright Enterprises v. Raimondo (2024), which overturned Chevron deference. The Seventh Circuit conducted de novo review of the statutory interpretation question but still ruled in favor of the CFPB's position.

In November 2024, the CFPB sought court approval of a consent order requiring Townstone to pay a $105,000 penalty.

== Relationship to other fair lending laws ==
ECOA works alongside several other federal laws addressing discrimination in credit and housing:

- The Fair Housing Act (1968) prohibits discrimination in residential real estate transactions, including mortgage lending, based on race, color, religion, sex, national origin, disability, or familial status. Many redlining cases are brought under both ECOA and the Fair Housing Act.
- The Home Mortgage Disclosure Act (1975) requires lenders to report data on mortgage applications, which regulators use to identify potential ECOA and Fair Housing Act violations.
- The Community Reinvestment Act (1977) requires banks to meet the credit needs of their entire communities, including low- and moderate-income neighborhoods.

In March 2023, the CFPB and DOJ filed a joint statement of interest in private litigation explaining that relying on discriminatory home appraisals can violate ECOA, as lenders cannot use appraisals they knew or should have known were discriminatory.

== See also ==
- Women's National Bank (Washington DC)
