= Juanita Gray =

Librarian in Denver, Colorado (1916–1987)

- Born: June 28, 1916; Atlanta, Georgia
- Died: July 8, 1987 (age 71); Denver, Colorado
- Occupation: Librarian
- Spouse: George W. Gray Jr.

Juanita Ross Gray (June 28, 1916 – July 8, 1987) was a librarian in Denver, Colorado, who was known for her community outreach efforts.

== Early life and education ==
Juanita Ross Gray was born on June 28, 1916, in Atlanta, Georgia. She attended Clark College in Atlanta and majored in English. She also attended the University of Pennsylvania and the University of Denver.

She married George W. Gray Jr. on December 25, 1938, in Atlanta. The couple raised two children.

She was at one point a sales representative for the Hamilton Management Corp.

== Community and civic affairs ==
Gray was a member of the following clubs and committees:

- Denver Cosmopolitan Club
- Denver Area Committee on Alcoholism
- National Committee on School Drop-Outs
- Denver Commission on Community Relations
- Wheatley YWCA
- National Committee on the Employment of Youth
- East Denver Dropout Committee
- Colorado Women's Committee on civil rights

Gray was well known for her participation in the Denver Schools. She ran to sit on the Denver Board of Education, and was the vice president of the Denver Parent-Teacher Association.

Gray was appointed to the Colorado State Junior College Committee by Governor Stephen McNichols.

From 1971 to 1977, Gray worked for the Denver Public Library system, focusing on outreach to the Black community. She was recognized for her outreach work with the Nell I. Scott Memorial Award: "Mrs. Gray was instrumental in creating a tutoring program at Warren Library in which fourth graders who weren't reading at their class level were tutored by eighth graders who were themselves termed under-achievers."

Governor Dick Lamm appointed her to the Colorado Centennial Bicentennial Commission, the Colorado Historic Preservation Review Board, and the National Endowment for the Humanities State Review Board. He awarded her a National Centennial Bicentennial medal.

Gray worked to persuade the Denver School Board to name a new elementary school in Montbello after Mrs. Jessie Maxwell, who was the first Black person appointed to serve as school principal in Colorado.

== Awards and decorations ==
- Cosmopolitan Humanitarian Award
- Delta Sigma Theta sorority Woman of the Year Award
- Syl Morgan Foundation Woman of the Year Award
- Barney Ford Human Rights Award
- Thomas Jefferson Centennial Leader Award
- Sigma Gamma Rho Sorority Outstanding Woman Award
- Denver Club's Woman of the Year Award
- EDEN Theatrical Workshop Award
- Colorado State Elks Woman of the Year Award
- Esquire Club's Harriet Tubman Award
- Denver Public Library's Blacks in Colorado Hall of Fame (posthumous)

== Legacy ==
On July 8, 1987, Gray died from injuries received in an automobile accident.

Denver Public Library honors Gray with the Juanita Gray Community Service Award each year. "For the last 33 years, DPL has honored Mrs. Gray’s legacy each year by nominating current leaders in the community who embody the same trailblazing spirit."
