= Welton Street =

Street in Denver, Colorado

Welton Street is a historic thoroughfare in Denver, Colorado, primarily located in the Five Points neighborhood northeast of downtown Denver. It is renowned as the commercial, cultural, and entertainment heart of Denver’s African American community from the 1920s through the 1950s and is often called the Harlem of the West.

The street forms the core of the Five Points Historic Cultural District, which features a self-guided walking tour with interpretive markers highlighting its significance in Black history, business, jazz, and civil rights in the Rocky Mountain region.

== History ==
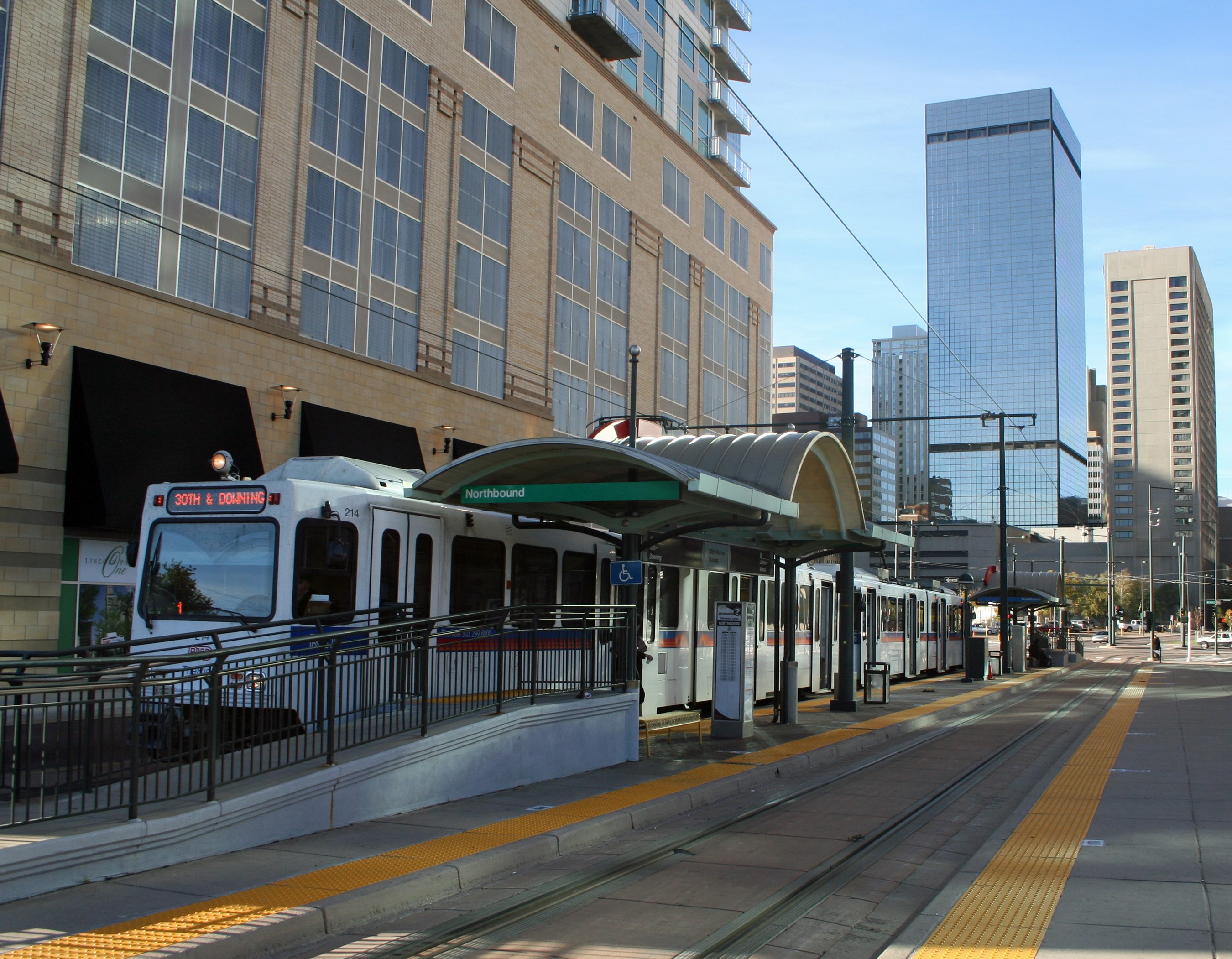
20th and Welton Street Station

Welton Street developed in the late 19th and early twentieth centuries as Denver expanded northeast from downtown. During the era of segregation and racially restrictive housing covenants, it became a self-contained hub for African American residents, businesses, and professionals who were often excluded from other parts of the city.

From the 1920s to the 1950s, the street flourished as Denver’s primary center for Black commerce and culture, functioning as a city within a city.

More than fifty clubs, hotels, theaters, restaurants, and professional offices lined the corridor, supporting economic independence and community life.

The area hosted major jazz and blues performers and served as a center for civil rights organizing, including union halls for railroad porters and waiters.

The neighborhood later experienced decline due to redlining, suburban flight, highway construction, and disinvestment in the later 20th century. Revitalization efforts intensified in the early 2000s with historic district designation and the creation of a business improvement district.

== Geography ==
Welton Street runs northeast through Denver as part of the city’s street grid. The primary historic commercial and cultural corridor generally spans from approximately 20th Avenue to 30th Avenue, with the most concentrated activity centered around the iconic Five Points intersection where Welton meets Washington Street, 26th Avenue, and 27th Street.

The street connects downtown Denver with the Five Points and Whittier neighborhoods and has been the focus of multiple streetscape, transit, and urban planning projects, including light rail service.

== Transit ==
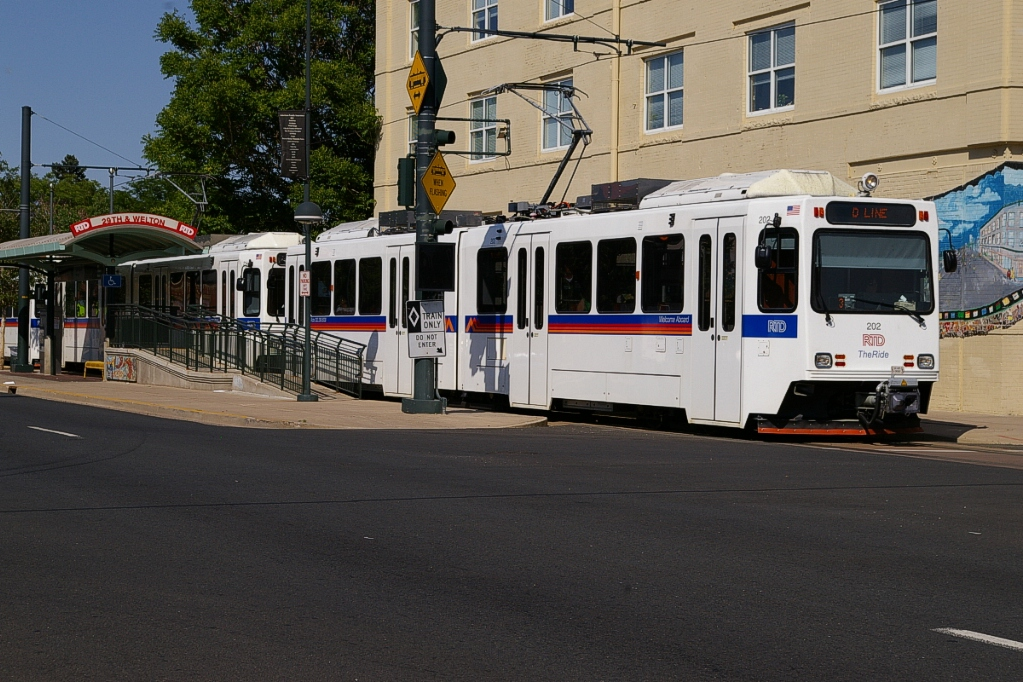
29th & Welton

Welton Street has several rail stops:

- 20th & Welton station
- 25th & Welton station
- 27th & Welton station
- 29th & Welton station (closed)

== Landmarks and Notable Sites ==
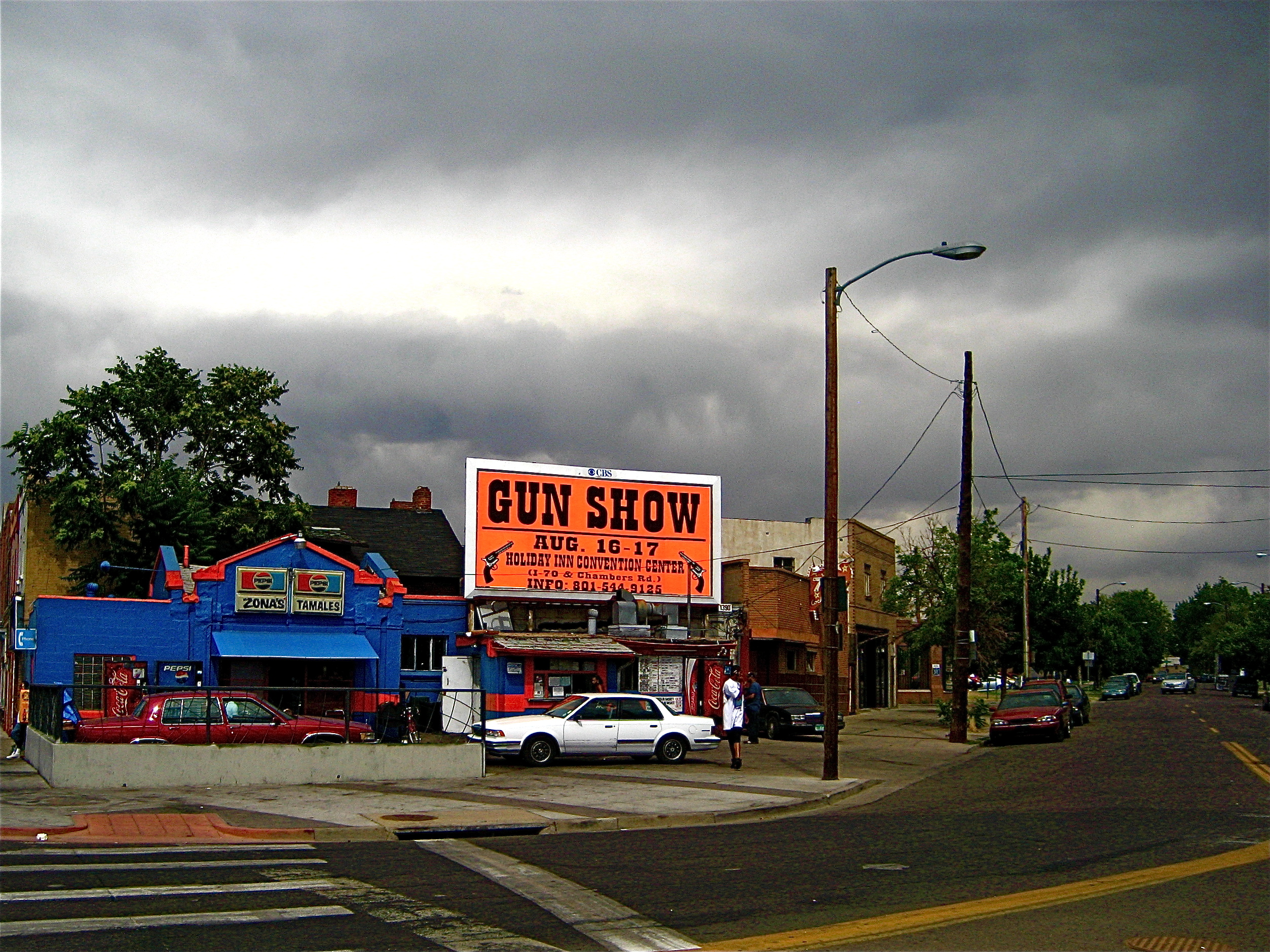
Intersection of Welton and Washington Streets in Denver, Colorado.

Several buildings along Welton Street are recognized for their historical importance:

- The Rossonian Hotel (2640–2642 Welton Street), built around 1912, served as both a hotel and nightclub. It was listed in The Negro Motorist Green Book and hosted legendary performers including Billie Holiday, Louis Armstrong, and Duke Ellington.
- Fire Station No. 3, completed in 1931 in Spanish bungalow style, housed an all-African American firefighting crew and became a symbol of community pride.
- The Roxy Theater, which opened in 1934, provided entertainment and a more equitable experience for Black patrons during segregation.

The Welton Street Cafe has operated as a longtime soul food restaurant and community gathering place on the corridor.

A series of historic interpretive markers along the street form the Welton Street Cultural District Walking Tour, which tells the stories of people, places, and events in Denver’s African American history.

The Blair-Caldwell African American Research Library serves as a modern cultural and educational anchor in the area.
