= Welton =

Welton may refer to:

== Places ==
=== United Kingdom ===
- Nether Welton, a place in Cumbria
- Welton, Cumbria, a place in Cumbria
- Welton, East Ayrshire, Scotland; a UK location
- Welton, East Riding of Yorkshire
- Welton, Lincolnshire
  - Welton Hill, a hamlet in above parish
  - Welton Cliff, a hamlet in above parish
  - Welton Rural District, a former rural district in Parts of Lindsey
- Welton, Northamptonshire
- Welton, Somerset
- Welton le Marsh, Lincolnshire
- Welton le Wold, Lincolnshire

=== Elsewhere ===
- El Welton, San Luis Río Colorado, a place in Mexico
- Welton, Iowa, United States
  - Welton Township, Clinton County, Iowa, township containing Welton, Iowa
- Wheeler, Wisconsin, United States (formerly called Welton)

== People ==
=== People with the given name ===
- Wélton (footballer) (born 1975), Brazilian football forward
- Welton Becket (1902-1969), American modern architect
- Welton Felipe (footballer, born 1986)
- Welton Felipe (footballer, born 1997)
- Welton Irie (born 1961), Jamaican reggae deejay
- Welton Jones, American theatre critic
- Welton Taylor (1919-2012), American microbiologist, inventor, and civil rights activist

=== People with the middle name ===
- Lorenzo Welton Elder, MD (1820-1892), American physician and politician
- Kate Welton Hogg (1869-1951), Australian physician
- Miles Welton Lord (1919-2016), United States District judge
- Thomas Welton Stanford (1832-1918), Australian businessman, spiritualist and philanthropist
- Fred Welton Warmsley III (born 1987), American record producer and sound artist

=== People with the surname ===
- Alton Welton (1886–1958), American track and field athlete
- Chauncey B. Welton (1844–1908), American politician
- Doug Welton, American politician
- Gilbert Welton, Bishop of Carlisle (1353–1362)
- Guy Welton (born 1978), English cricketer
- Hannah Welton (born 1990), American musician
- Joan Welton (1930-2021), American actress and singer
- John Welton (1929-2013), Canadian football player
- Norman Welton (1928–2009), American journalist
- Pat Welton (1928–2010), British football player
- Richard Welton (1671/1672–1726), English Anglican non-juror
- Stephen Welton (born 1961), founder and chairman of the Business Growth Fund
- Theodore Allen Welton (1918–2010), American physicist
- Thomas Abercrombie Welton (1835–1918), British statistician and chartered accountant
- Tom Welton (born 1964), British chemist
- William Welton (missionary) (1809–1858), English clergyman, physician, and surgeon
- William Leslie Welton (1874–1934), American architect

=== Titles ===
- Elizabeth Sanderson, Baroness Sanderson of Welton, British political advisor, life peer, and journalist

== Businesses and organizations ==
- Cook, Welton & Gemmell, former shipbuilders based in Hull and Beverley, East Riding of Yorkshire
- Weltons Brewery, brewery founded in 1995 by Ray Welton

== Railway stations ==
- Welton railway station, former station for Welton and Watford in Northamptonshire
- Midsomer Norton and Welton railway station, former station on the Great Western Railway
- 20th & Welton station, RTD light rail station in Denver, Colorado, United States
- 25th & Welton station, RTD light rail station in Denver, Colorado, United States
- 27th & Welton station, RTD light rail station in Denver, Colorado, United States
- 29th & Welton station, former RTD light rail station in Denver, Colorado, United States

== Other ==
- Welton (1809), cargo ship wrecked 1817
- Welton Rovers F.C., Somerset County FA non-league football club

== See also ==
- Weldon (disambiguation)
