= Five Points Jazz Festival =

Discontinued jazz festival in Denver

Five Points Jazz Festival was an annual free outdoor jazz celebration held in Denver's historic Five Points neighborhood from 2003 to 2024. Originally a small community event, the festival grew to include more than 50 bands across 10 plus stages, attracting 100,000 attendees in its later years.

== History ==
The festival was launched in 2003 in the parking lot of the Blair-Caldwell African American Research Library, and despite being hit with a snowstorm was considered a success. By the 2020s, it had grown to be considered one of "two internationally-known annual celebrations" in Five Points, together with the Juneteeth Music Festival, and expanded to include a multitude of family oriented activities such as face painting and a pop-culture classroom.

== Cultural Significance ==
Five Points has a rich jazz history, with past performances in the area by Duke Ellington, Billie Holiday, Louis Armstrong, and Charlie Parker. The festival was viewed as a celebration of the musical and cultural history of the neighborhood , an effort to "re-create the energy of jazz in Five Points like it was decades ago", and something "important to [the Five Points] community and the jazz community” as a way to help preserve its history.

== Grand Marshals and Honorees ==
Each year, the festival began with a parade led by grand marshals chosen for their cultural contributions. Notable figures who have served as grand marshals include:

- Charles Burrell (musician), a pioneering bassist often referred to as the “Jackie Robinson of classical music.” He served as a grand marshal of the Five Points Jazz Festival.
- Cleo Parker Robinson, founder of the Cleo Parker Robinson Dance Ensemble and major figure in the Denver arts scene.
- Carlos Lando, longtime KUVO music director and advocate for Colorado jazz.

== Closure ==
In 2024, the City of Denver announced that the festival would be discontinued and replaced by the Five Points Jazz Activation Fund, a grant program intended to support jazz performances and education in the neighborhood year-round. The city's decision to discontinue the festival sparked a mixed response. While some applauded the new year-round support model, others criticized the loss of the festival.
