= The Denver Star =

American weekly newspaper

- Type: Weekly newspaper
- Founded: 1913
- Ceased publication: 1963
- Headquarters: Denver, Colorado, U.S.
- ISSN: 2577-2376
- OCLC number: 10571156

Franklin's Paper, The Statesman
- Founder(s): Clara Williams Franklin, Chester Arthur Franklin
- Founded: 1901
- Ceased publication: 1913
- ISSN: 2577-2333
- OCLC number: 23238142

The Statesman
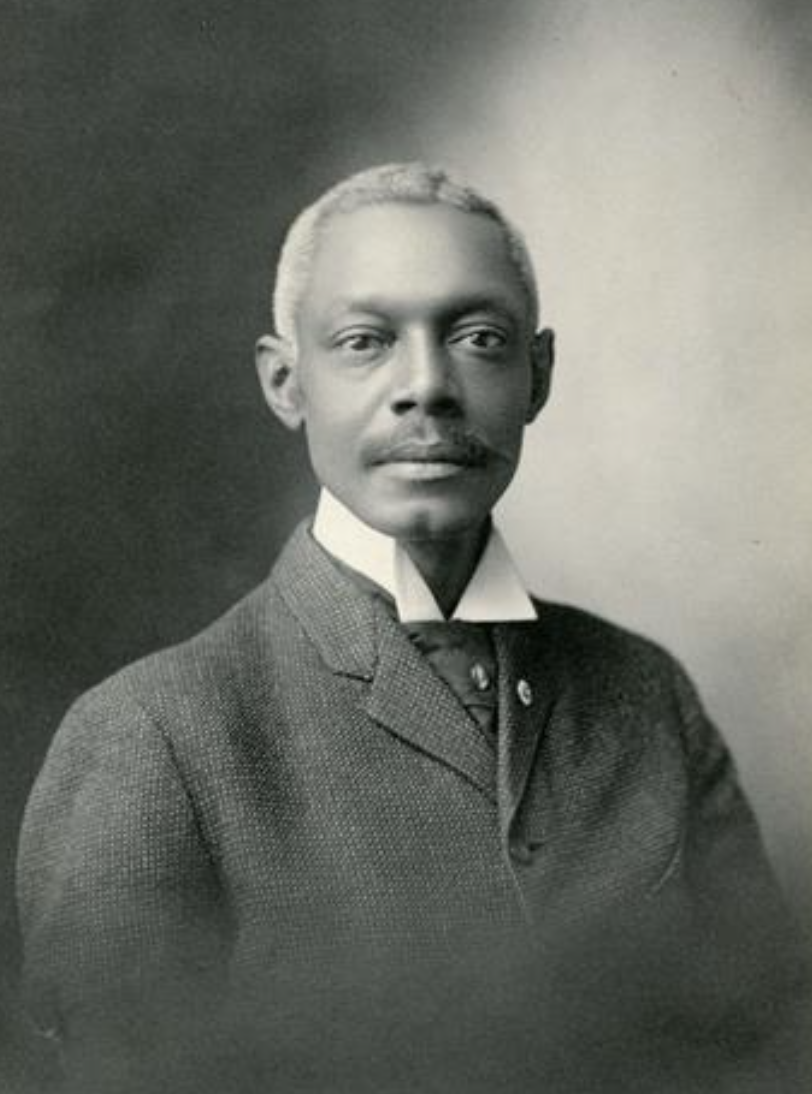
- "The Statesman" founder and editor, Joseph D.D. Rivers (c. 1900)
- Founder: Joseph D.D. Rivers
- Founded: 1888
- Ceased publication: 1901
- ISSN: 2577-2317
- OCLC number: 9542060

The Denver Star (1888–1963), established as The Statesman and also known as Franklin's Paper, The Statesman, was an American weekly newspaper for the African American community. It was published in Denver and was distributed in Colorado, Wyoming, Montana, Utah, and New Mexico.

== History ==
The newspaper was founded as The Statesman in 1888, by Joseph D. D. Rivers. From 1901 until 1913, the paper was renamed to the Franklin's Paper, The Statesman. In November 1912, the paper was renamed The Denver Star.

Joseph D. D. Rivers was the first owner of the newspaper, followed by Edwin H. Hackley (1892–1898); George F. Franklin (1898–1901); after his death his wife, Clara Williams Franklin and her son, Chester Arthur Franklin who ran the newspaper (1901–1913); followed by Albert Henderson Wade Ross (or A.H.W. Ross) and the Denver Independent Publishing Company (1913–1963).

Many of the owners of the newspaper also served as its editor. Editors of the newspaper included Joseph D. D. Rivers, Charles Segret Muse, Edwin H. Hackley, and Azalia Smith Hackley. In 1917, George G. Ross was an associate editor and business manager. In the early 1960s, it was purchased on Wendell A. Peters, an attorney who also served as editor.

Archived editions of the paper are extant at Chronicling America, Newspapers.com, and at the Denver Public Library.

== See also ==
- Denver White Elephants
- Rossonian Hotel
