= Street system of Denver =

Dual street grid system in Denver, CO

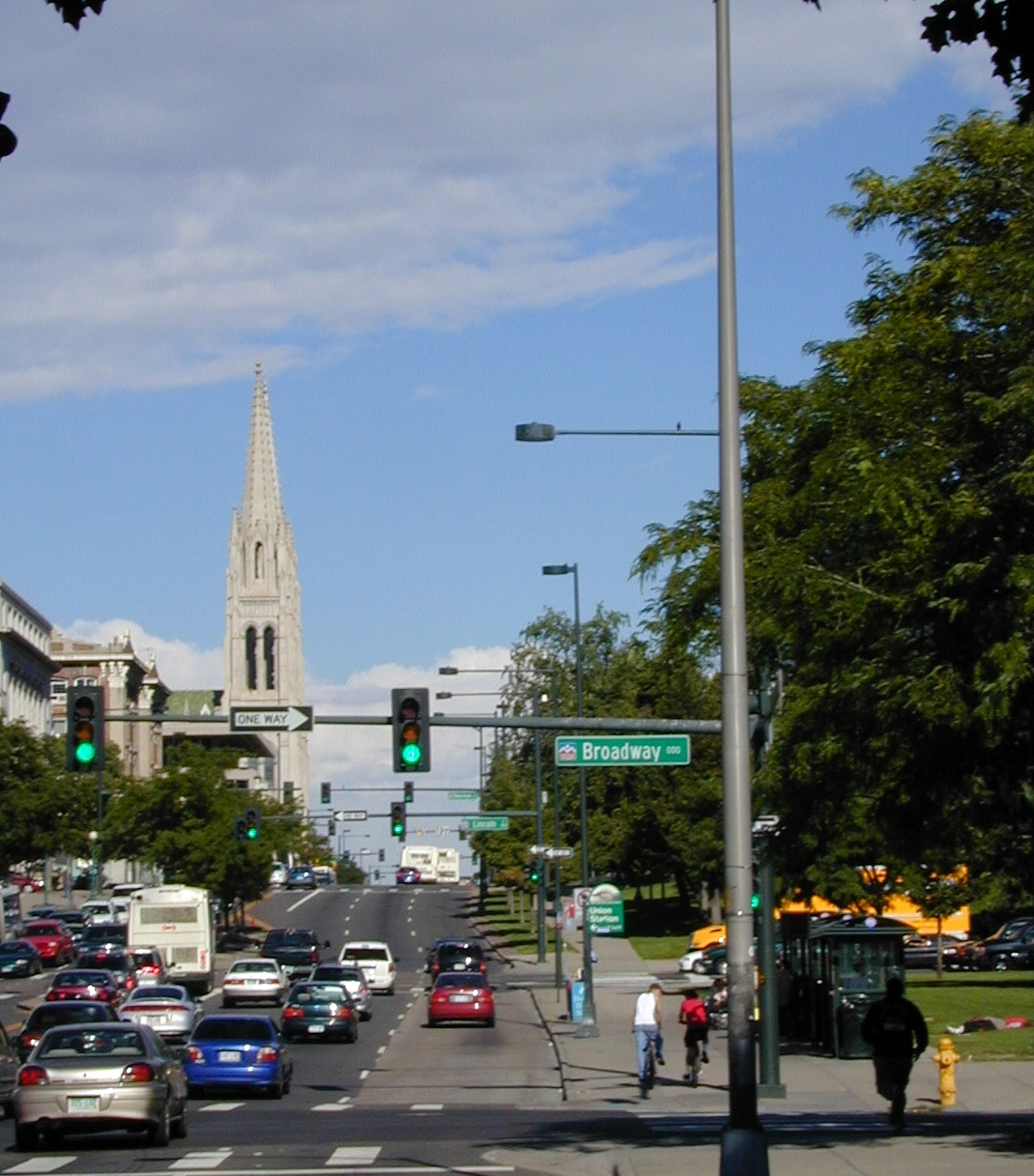
Colfax Avenue at Broadway, where the downtown street grid and the "normal" city grid meet

The oldest part of Denver, Colorado, now the neighborhoods of Auraria Campus, LoDo, much of downtown, and Five Points, is laid out on a grid plan that is oriented diagonal to the four cardinal directions. The rest of the city, including the eastern part of downtown, is laid out primarily on a grid oriented to the cardinal directions. In this larger grid, from east to west, there are generally 16 city blocks per mile, except between Zuni Street and Lowell Boulevard in west Denver. From north to south, there are typically eight blocks per mile, although there are many areas with more blocks per mile. Addresses follow a decimal system, with addresses advancing by one hundred at each cross street.

Some major arterial roads, such as Leetsdale Drive and South Santa Fe Drive, fall outside this pattern and run diagonally through the city. These roads generally originated as county roads or other major routes used by early settlers. The names of many of these roads change as they wind through the grid, following the name officially designated for a road in that area. Interstate highways do not follow the grid plan.

== History ==
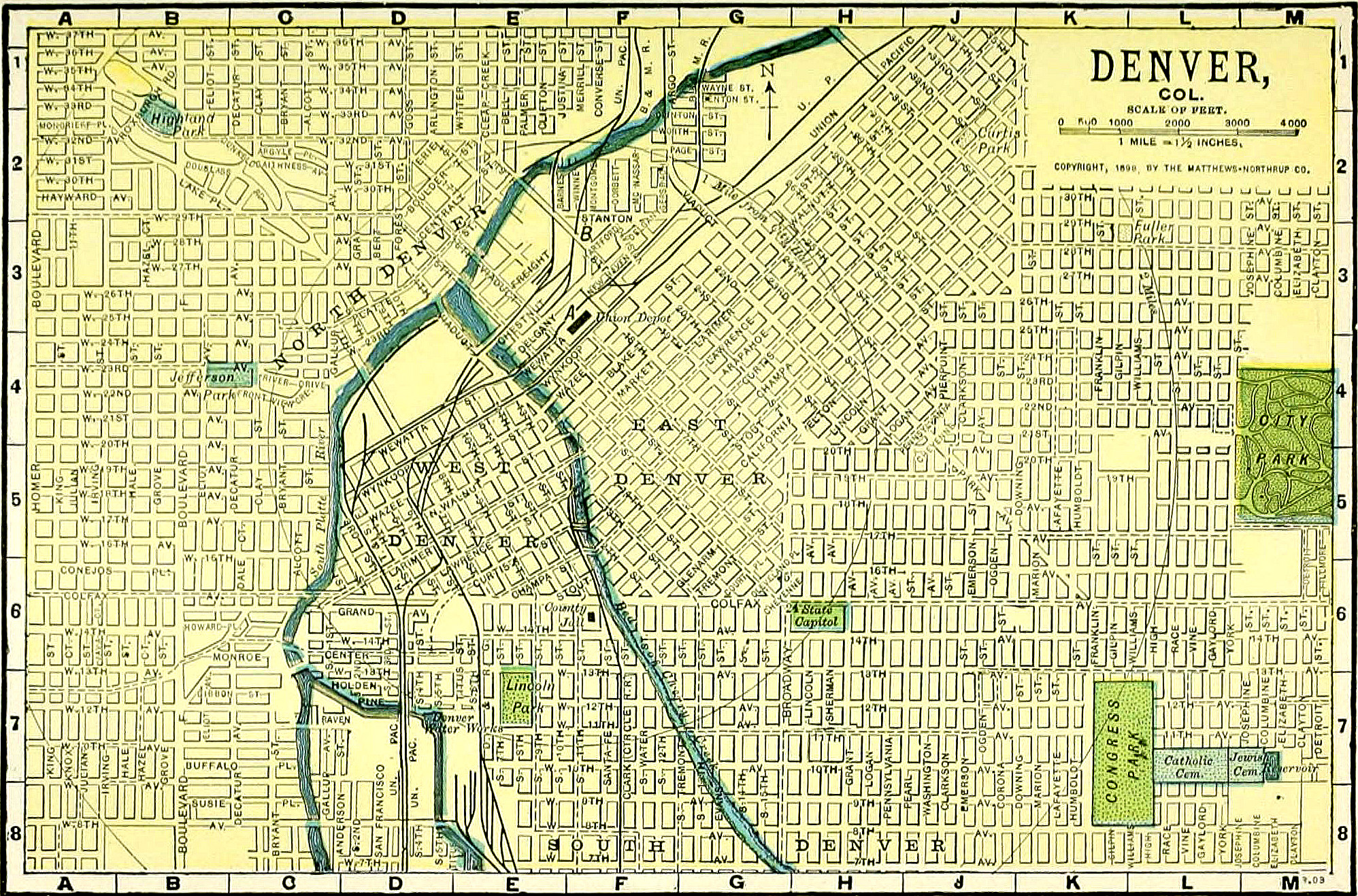
Map of Denver in 1898, showing the two different grid alignments.

Modern Denver has two grids. One is laid out diagonal with respect to the four cardinal directions and is found on Auraria Campus, downtown, and northeast of downtown into the Five Points neighborhood. Most of the rest of the city's streets, as well as many of those of the surrounding suburbs, are laid out in an east–west/north–south pattern. These two grids result from early land development in the area.

=== The diagonal grid ===
The first streets in Denver were platted in what was then the town of Auraria, founded in 1858; it was the first permanent settlement of Europeans in Colorado, which was then part of the Kansas Territory. The streets were laid out parallel to the south bank of Cherry Creek near its confluence with the South Platte River, with perpendicular cross streets. These streets that followed the path of a natural body of water happened to be diagonal to the four cardinal directions.

The town of Denver City was founded later in November 1858, located across Cherry Creek from Auraria. Its founders, including General William Larimer, collaborated to plot and name the streets of the new town. These were laid out parallel (and perpendicular) not to Cherry Creek, but to the Cherokee Trail, which passed through Denver along what is today 15th Street. While this was not exactly the same angle as the streets of Auraria, the cross streets did closely match up at Cherry Creek.

=== The east–west/north–south grid ===
In 1864, developer Henry C. Brown laid out the first streets in Denver parallel to the cardinal directions, with streets running directly north–south and east–west. His grid was located directly east of Denver (which had absorbed Auraria in 1860), from what is now Broadway to the alley between Grant and Logan Streets and from 11th to 20th Avenues. This layout followed federal land policy.

About the same time, territorial governor John Evans laid out streets on an east–west/north–south grid south of the original Denver plat, southeast of the modern intersection between Broadway and Colfax Avenue.

=== Early street designations ===
Denver grew rapidly in its first thirty years. Areas were developed with little direction from the government of the young city, with each developer platting streets largely independently of others. As a result, where original developments meet, many streets do not line up with one another; for example, there are many displacements on East Colfax Avenue in streets running north and south. In fact, while there are 40 city blocks between Broadway and Colorado Boulevard south of East Colfax Avenue, there are only 39 blocks in the same stretch on the north side.

Street names reflected this bottom-up emergence, and street names were not coordinated from development to development, even for along the same north–south or east–west line. Some names were used more than once, by different streets across various Denver neighborhoods and surrounding towns. There was no universal system for the use of terms like "street", "avenue", etc. Later, these terms were defined such that "street" designated roads running north and south and aligned with the hundreds of the numbering system, with "court" for intermediate (non-hundreds) north–south roads and "way" for roads which start north–south but curve to intersect with another north–south road; "avenue", "place", and "drive" (respectively) are the corresponding terms for roads running east and west. Major arterials in both directions, however, are often called "boulevards", and "road" and "parkway" also make appearances.

Attempts to rationalize the street system began early. In 1873, the diagonal streets of Auraria and original Denver were renamed, with the zero point at the original southwest corner of Denver, the intersection of West Colfax Avenue and Zuni Street, near the South Platte River. According to this system, still in place in modern Denver, streets running from northwest to southeast are designated as heading north from the zero point and are numbered, while streets running from northeast to southwest are designated as heading east from the zero point and are named. A notable exception came when 23rd Street, which had been treated like any other numbered streets in downtown Denver, was renamed Park Avenue West and designated as running west rather than north, in order to match up with its eastern continuation, Park Avenue, which extends diagonally south-east into the otherwise compass-oriented grid east of Broadway.

The east–west avenues, originally named, were first numbered in 1871, with modern East 35th Avenue designated First Avenue; however, this system was abandoned in 1886, when the city passed an ordinance linking avenue numbers to the street numbers of the diagonal grid. Where a numbered street met an avenue at Broadway, the avenue was given the number of the connecting street; thus 16th Street provided the number for 16th Avenue, and so forth. An exception was Colfax Avenue, which meets 15th Street and is the equivalent of 15th Avenue, but retained its original name.

The avenues were then numbered consecutively to the north, even where they began to deviate from the diagonal grid, so that 27th Street meets 26th Avenue in the Five Points intersection. They are also extrapolated north of the grid, beyond Denver's main northern border at 52nd Avenue to 168th Avenue at the border between Adams and Weld Counties. Avenue numbers are also extrapolated south from Colfax to First Avenue. Ellsworth Ave is the 00 point, and south of here avenues are named.

=== Development of the modern decimal grid ===
In 1887, a decimal grid was imposed. Instead of counting addresses up arbitrarily along a direction, this system specified a "hundred block" for each street. For example, First Street is the 100 block, with all addresses on any named street between First and Second Streets ascending from 100 (nearest First Street) to 199 (nearest Second Street). Named streets also follow this pattern, with Cheyenne Place designated the 100 block and numbers increasing toward the northwest. In the diagonal grid, even-numbered addresses are on the west (i.e. southwest) sides of numbered streets and the east (i.e. northeast) side of named streets.

In the rest of the grid, even numbers are on the east sides of streets and the south sides of avenues, while odd numbers are on the west sides of streets and north sides of avenues. This decimal system forms a Cartesian coordinate system whose axes are Broadway (north−south) and Ellsworth Avenue (east−west). For numbered avenues, the hundred block corresponds to the number of the avenue (e.g. 17th Avenue designates the 1700 block North). Avenues south of Ellsworth are named, as are all streets running north−south, and have hundred-block numbers extending from the axes. Strictly speaking, only the portions of streets south of Ellsworth need be designated "South" and the portions of avenues west of Broadway need be designated "West." Without a directional designation, streets are automatically assumed to be north of Ellsworth and avenues assumed to be east of Broadway, although it is common to refer to these avenues as "East".

=== Application of consistent names ===
Street names were originally applied with no consistency; the same road designation might have as many as ten different names in different parts of the city, and many different roads might share the same name. This inconsistency created significant problems for the Denver Union Water Company, which had difficulties both providing service and billing because of the chaotic street system. A bookkeeper, Howard Maloney, collaborated with the city to impose an orderly set of names to the roads, with each unique name designating exactly one road. In most areas, these streets are named in alphabetical order. The first set of changes took place in 1897, with further renaming in 1904. In 1906, many adjacent communities adopted Denver's system.

== Street classification ==
The City and County of Denver's zoning board classifies streets into three types based on functionality. Arterials are major routes, arranged in a network to provide mobility around the city. Collector streets move traffic from arterials into neighborhoods and business districts. All other streets are local streets, which provide access to individual lots.

== Names of major Denver streets ==
- Alameda Avenue is a major east–west thoroughfare at 300 south. It travels from near Red Rocks Park to Buckley Space Force Base in Aurora. The road disappears briefly in the Cherry Creek neighborhood as it is displaced by the namesake Cherry Creek. On the other side of the creek, Alameda continues eastward toward Aurora. It is sometimes known as Alameda Parkway.
- Brighton Boulevard is named for Brighton, Colorado, and was the original route to that city, the Adams County seat. It roughly follows the South Platte River's path and the Union Pacific Railroad tracks. It is also called Brighton Road in sections, and in Commerce City, north of Denver, there are sections in which Brighton Boulevard and Brighton Road both run separately, parallel to each other.
- Broadway was named by developer Henry C. Brown after New York City's Broadway. It is the demarcation between east and west avenues in Denver. The intersection of Broadway and Ellsworth Avenue is the center of Denver's decimal-based address system. All points in every direction count up from the intersection. Broadway continues uninterrupted throughout the city, for approximately 20 miles, with 3.2 miles (5.1 km) from I-25 to 20th Avenue carrying only southbound traffic. North of downtown, Interstate 25 roughly replaces Broadway as the demarcation point for cities in the Denver Regional Council of Government.
- Bruce Randolph Avenue is equivalent to East 34th Avenue between Downing Street and Dahlia Street. It honors "Daddy" Bruce Randolph, a local community figure in the 1970s and 1980s.
- Colfax Avenue, equivalent to 15th Avenue, was named for Indiana Representative and 29th Speaker of the House Schuyler Colfax in an attempt to win his support for Colorado's statehood. The name first appeared on maps in 1868.
- Colorado Boulevard is a major north–south thoroughfare at 4000 East. It also carries a significant portion of CO Highway 2. Originally named McKinley Boulevard.
- Ellsworth Avenue, while not a major thoroughfare anywhere in the city, is the demarcation between north and south streets. All avenues north of Ellsworth are numbered, and south of it are named.
- East Hale Parkway runs through the neighborhood of Hale and north of Rose Medical Center. It runs from Albion Street to Grape Street, and from 8th Avenue to 12th Avenue.
- Evans Avenue, and the famous Mount Evans, which appears to be at the end of the street, is named after (as noted above) territorial governor John Evans. It interchanges with several major highways and runs east to the Denver city limit, where it transitions to Iliff Avenue and enters Aurora.
- Federal Boulevard is a major north–south thoroughfare which runs as a crosstown road through Denver. It travels from West Bowles Avenue in Littleton to West 120th Avenue in Broomfield.
- Hampden Avenue is a major east–west thoroughfare at 3500 South. Most of the route also carries US 285 through the southwestern suburbs, where it is a limited access highway. It then becomes a 4 to 6 lane avenue until reaching Dayton Street near the Denver/Aurora border, where it is interrupted by Cherry Creek Dam and turns north into Aurora's Havana Street. Hampden then continues through Aurora at Parker Road/CO 83 just east of Cherry Creek Reservoir.
- Lincoln Street runs parallel to Broadway, one block to the east. For 3.2 miles (5.1 km) between I-25 and 20th Avenue, Broadway carries only southbound traffic and Lincoln becomes a major thoroughfare, carrying four lanes of northbound traffic. It is distinct from Lincoln Avenue, a mostly east–west thoroughfare in suburban Douglas County.
- Martin Luther King Jr. Boulevard is equivalent to East 32nd Avenue from Downing Street to Havana Street. It runs through several largely African American neighborhoods, including Clayton and Northeast Park Hill, and received this name in 1980. In 2019, it was extended eastward to Peoria Street in Aurora, where it becomes Fitzsimons Parkway.
- Montview Boulevard is the equivalent of East 20th Avenue east of Colorado Boulevard and was named for Denver's view of the Rocky Mountains.
- Morrison Road is named for the town of Morrison. It originally began at West Colfax Avenue, and exists for only brief portions near the Platte River and between Knox Court and Sheridan Boulevard in west Denver before reappearing west of Wadsworth Boulevard on its trajectory to Morrison.
- Park Avenue/Park Avenue West is the equivalent of 23rd Street in downtown Denver. It runs from I-25 south-east through downtown. It maintains its diagonal heading through Uptown and the classic (N-S-E-W) grid, coming to an end at the three-way intersection with Colfax Avenue and Franklin Street.
- Santa Fe Drive follows the path of an old trail from Denver to Santa Fe, New Mexico. This was called the Santa Fe Trail, although it is not part of the more well-known Santa Fe Trail leading to Missouri. From CO 470 to the I-25 interchange, Santa Fe Drive also carries U.S. Route 85.
- Sheridan Boulevard is a major north–south thoroughfare located at 5200 West. Much of Sheridan's distance serves as a city boundary between Denver and Lakewood. From the southern end, Sheridan starts from roughly Quincy Avenue in Littleton to Baseline Road in Weld County.
- Speer Boulevard runs diagonally through the heart of Denver starting in the Highland neighborhood at Irving Street slicing through the city until it combines with 1st Avenue in the Country Club Neighborhood. A large portion of the road follows the flow of Cherry Creek through the city.
- University Boulevard is a major north–south thoroughfare located at 2350 East, named for the University of Denver, which it runs through. While it does not exist north of 6th Avenue (its traffic separates into the York Street / Josephine Street couplet), it is a major artery into and through Denver's far south suburbs, where it becomes 2400 East, south of Hampden Avenue.
- Welton Street is a historic thoroughfare in Denver, Colorado, primarily located in the Five Points neighborhood northeast of downtown Denver. It is renowned as the commercial, cultural, and entertainment heart of Denver’s African American community from the 1920s through the 1950s and is often called the Harlem of the West.

== Highways ==
Highways that have portions running in or near Denver include:

- Interstate highways: I-25, I-70, I-76, I-270, and I-225.
- Other limited-access freeways: US 36, US 6, US 285, C-470, SH 58.
- Toll highways: E-470 and the Northwest Parkway.
