= Denver White Elephants =

Defunct baseball team

The Denver White Elephants was a semi-professional independent African-American baseball team in Denver, Colorado, United States. The team was active from 1915 to 1935, and practiced at Broadway Park at 6th and Acoma Streets in Denver. The team played exhibition games against White teams. It was owned and led by Albert Henderson Wade Ross (A.H.W. Ross) (1884–1939), a businessman who ran the Rossonian Hotel in Denver's Five Points neighborhood.

The Denver Post Tournament was the most popular baseball event locally, Negro league baseball teams and African-American players were not allowed to participate until 1934. The Denver White Elephants and the Kansas City Monarchs were the first Black teams to participate at the Denver Post Tournament in 1934.

In 2020, the team was part of a museum exhibition called "Game Changers" at the History Colorado Center, which examined the role of African American baseball within the history of racial desegregation.

== Players ==
- Tom “Pistol Pete” Albright, pitcher
- Theodore “Bubbles” Anderson, infielder
- Sam Holmes
