= Bubbles Anderson =

American baseball player (1904–1943)

- Infielder
- Born: November 4, 1904; Denver, Colorado, U.S.
- Died: March 14, 1943 (aged 38); Denver, Colorado, U.S.
- Batted: Right Threw: Right
- Stats at Baseball Reference

Teams
- Denver White Elephants (1920–1921, 1932–1933); All Nations (1922); Kansas City Monarchs (1922–1923); Washington Potomacs (1924); Birmingham Black Barons (1924); Indianapolis ABCs (1925); Atlanta Black Crackers (1938)

Theodore Miles "Bubbles" Anderson (November 4, 1904 – March 14, 1943) was an American professional baseball player in the Negro leagues. He played primarily second base for the Kansas City Monarchs, Washington Potomacs, Birmingham Black Barons, and the Indianapolis ABCs from 1922 until 1925. He played for the minor Negro league Denver White Elephants from 1920 through 1921 and again from 1932 to 1933.

Anderson was the only Colorado-born baseball player to play in the Negro Leagues. Along with pitcher Tom "Pistol Pete" Albright, he is considered one of Colorado's premiere black players of the twentieth century.

== Early life ==
Theodore Miles Anderson was born on November 4, 1904 in Denver to George and Hattie Anderson. He was the sixth of nine children, with siblings George Jr. (1887), Fred (1890), Carrie (1893), Rhoda (1896), Fay (1899), Stanley (1908), Marcella (1911), and Henry (1913). It isn't known how or why Anderson received the nickname "Bubbles," but it was a memorable nickname that followed him throughout his childhood.

== Baseball career ==
Anderson began his career for the Denver White Elephants, a semi-professional African-American team, in 1920 at age 15.

The Kansas City Monarchs discovered 17-year-old Bubbles while the team was barnstorming through Denver in 1922 and signed him to a contract. Anderson played 19 games at second base during his first season with the Monarchs in 1922. He compiled a .212 batting average, knocking in only 1 RBI and committing 5 errors from the field.

In the next season, Anderson saw the field in 61 contests. He played two games apiece at third base and shortstop while still primarily starting at second base. He posted a .275 batting average with 22 RBIs and 3 stolen bases.

After two seasons with the Monarchs, Bubbles moved east and started the 1924 season at second base with the Washington Potomacs, but he was released and finished the season with the Birmingham Black Barons. In 1925, Bubbles finished his career with the Indianapolis ABCs. On a road trip to Kansas City to face the Monarchs, he left the Indianapolis ABCs and returned home to Denver due to illness.

== Post-baseball life ==
In the following years, Bubbles never married nor had any children. He worked as a janitor and returned to baseball for a second stint with the White Elephants in 1932 and 1933. His professional baseball career ended in 1935.

Anderson later served in the United States Army during World War II.

== Death and legacy ==
Theodore "Bubbles" Anderson died at his home in Denver from a gastric ulcer on March 14, 1943. His funeral was held four days later and his body was laid to rest in an unmarked grave at Fairmount Cemetery. His grave received a headstone in 2005 through a joint effort between historian Jay Sanford and the Fairmount Heritage Foundation.

Anderson was inducted into the Colorado Sports Hall of Fame in April 2025.
