= 29th & Welton station =

Former light rail station in Denver, Colorado

29th & Welton
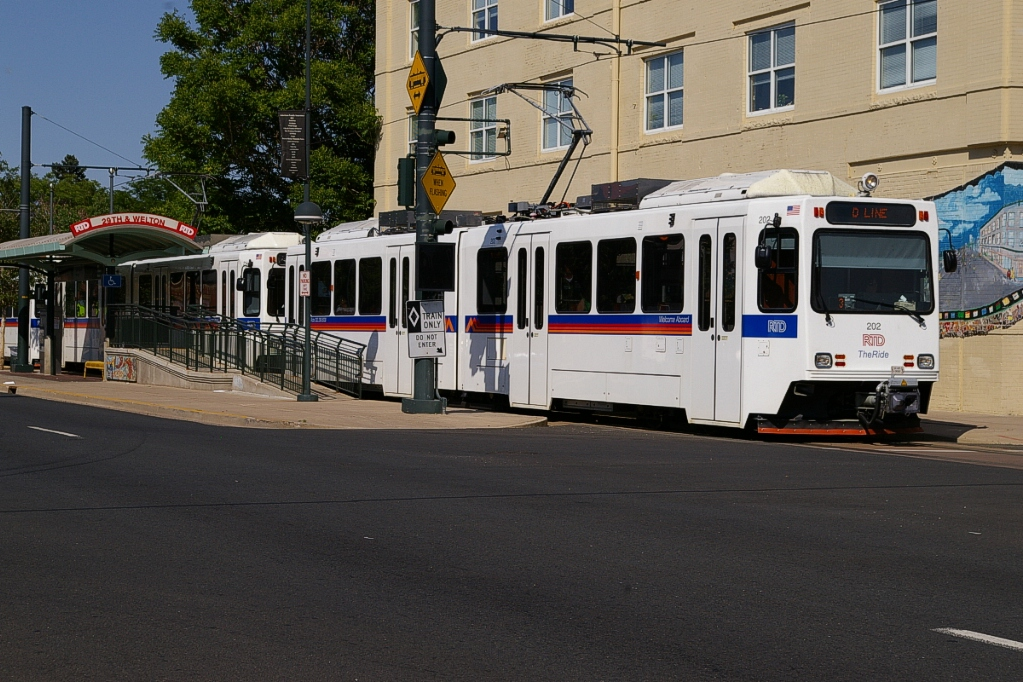
- Southbound D Line train departing 29th-Welton station

General information
- Location: 2940 Welton Street; Denver, Colorado
- Coordinates: 39.756919°N 104.975211°W
- Owner: Regional Transportation District
- Line: Central Corridor
- Platforms: 1 side platform
- Tracks: 1

Construction
- Structure type: At-grade
- Accessible: Yes

Other information
- Status: Closed

History
- Opened: October 8, 1994
- Closed: January 6, 2013

Services
Preceding station	RTD	Following station
30th & Downing Terminus	D Line (Former Service)	27th & Welton toward Littleton–Mineral
Location

29th & Welton station was an RTD light rail station in the Five Points neighborhood of Denver, Colorado, United States. Formerly operating as part of the D Line, the station was opened on October 8, 1994, and was operated by the Regional Transportation District.

The station closed on January 6, 2013, as part of RTD's January Service Changes to help with keeping trains running on time and improving bus connections at the 30th & Downing station. The RTD Board of Directors voted in October 2013 to not demolish the station in light of ongoing studies of the Welton Street corridor. The January 14, 2018 service changes introduced the L Line, which now passes through this station in place of the D Line.
