= Albert Henderson Wade Ross =

American businessman (1884–1939)

- Born: 1884; Kentucky, U.S.
- Died: 1939 (aged 54–55); U.S.
- Other name: A.H.W. Wade
- Occupations: Businessman, lawyer, newspaper owner, and baseball team owner

Albert Henderson Wade Ross (1884–1939), whose name is often abbreviated as A. H. W. Ross, was an American businessman, lawyer, newspaper owner, and baseball team owner. Ross and the Denver Independent Publishing Company were owners from 1913 to 1963 of The Denver Star (formerly The Statesman), an African-American newspaper. He owned and led the African American baseball team the Denver White Elephants, active from 1915 to 1935. Ross had also been the manager of the Rossonian Hotel (a NHRP-listed building) in the Five Points neighborhood of Denver, which was renamed after him in 1929. Some sources state that Ross owned the Rossonian starting in either 1928 or 1929, and others state he owned it in the mid-1930s. He had also worked in real estate and owned the Metropolitan Realty Co. (or Metropolitan Real Estate and Investing Company), and was a member of the Denver NAACP.
