= Welton le Marsh =

Village and civil parish in the East Lindsey district of Lincolnshire, England

Coordinates: 53.194987°N 0.202503°E

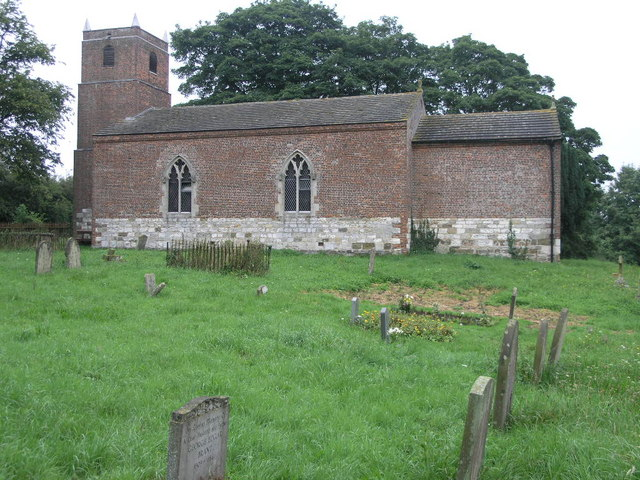
- St Martin's Church, Welton le Marsh

- Location within Lincolnshire
- Population: 212 (2011)
- OS grid reference: TF472686
  - London: 115 mi (185 km) S
- Civil parish: Welton le Marsh
- District: East Lindsey
- Shire county: Lincolnshire
- Region: East Midlands
- Country: England
- Sovereign state: United Kingdom
- Post town: Spilsby
- Postcode district: PE23
- Police: Lincolnshire
- Fire: Lincolnshire
- Ambulance: East Midlands
- UK Parliament: Louth and Horncastle

Welton le Marsh (or Welton in the Marsh) is a village and civil parish in the East Lindsey district of Lincolnshire, England. It is situated approximately 6 miles (10 km) north-east from the town of Spilsby and approximately 5 miles (8.0 km) south from the town of Alford. The hamlet of Boothby lies within the parish, about 1 mile (1.6 km) east of Welton le Marsh village.

The name 'Welton le Marsh' derives from the Old English Wella-tun meaning 'farm/settlement with a spring/stream'. Marsh was added to distinguish from the other villages named Welton in Lincolnshire.

The parish church is dedicated to Saint Martin, and was originally medieval, but rebuilt in 1792 of stone and brick, and restored in 1891. It is a Grade II* listed building.

A Neolithic flint axe and perforated stone hammer head were found here in 1948 and 1906. A Bronze Age flanged axe was found just outside moated area at Hanby Hall Farm.

The remains of a motte are located about 275 yards (251 m) east of Hanby Hall Farm. The motte is about 5.5 yards (5.0 m) high, and surrounded by a ditch.

Thwaite Hall is a Grade II listed building, reputedly part of a former Augustinian Priory, with attached cottage; the present house dates from the 14th century. The Lincs to the Past website describes it as the site of an Augustinian Cell belonging to Thornton Abbey which was recorded in 1440 and which still existed in 1536.

Welton le Marsh has a local public house, The Wheel Inn.

Also within the parish is Candlesby Hill Quarry, a nature reserve which was once Gunby estate chalk pit. It is a Site of Special Scientific Interest (SSSI) maintained by the Lincolnshire Wildlife Trust.

In June 1893, two Welton-le-Marsh residents with the names Johnson and Kime were violently killed after wandering onto part of the East Lincolnshire Railway between Willoughby and Alford. Having not noticed the oncoming train, Johnson was decapitated, his head resting nearly a hundred yards from the body, and Kime was severely mutilated.
