= 25th & Welton station =

Light rail station in Denver, Colorado

25th•Welton
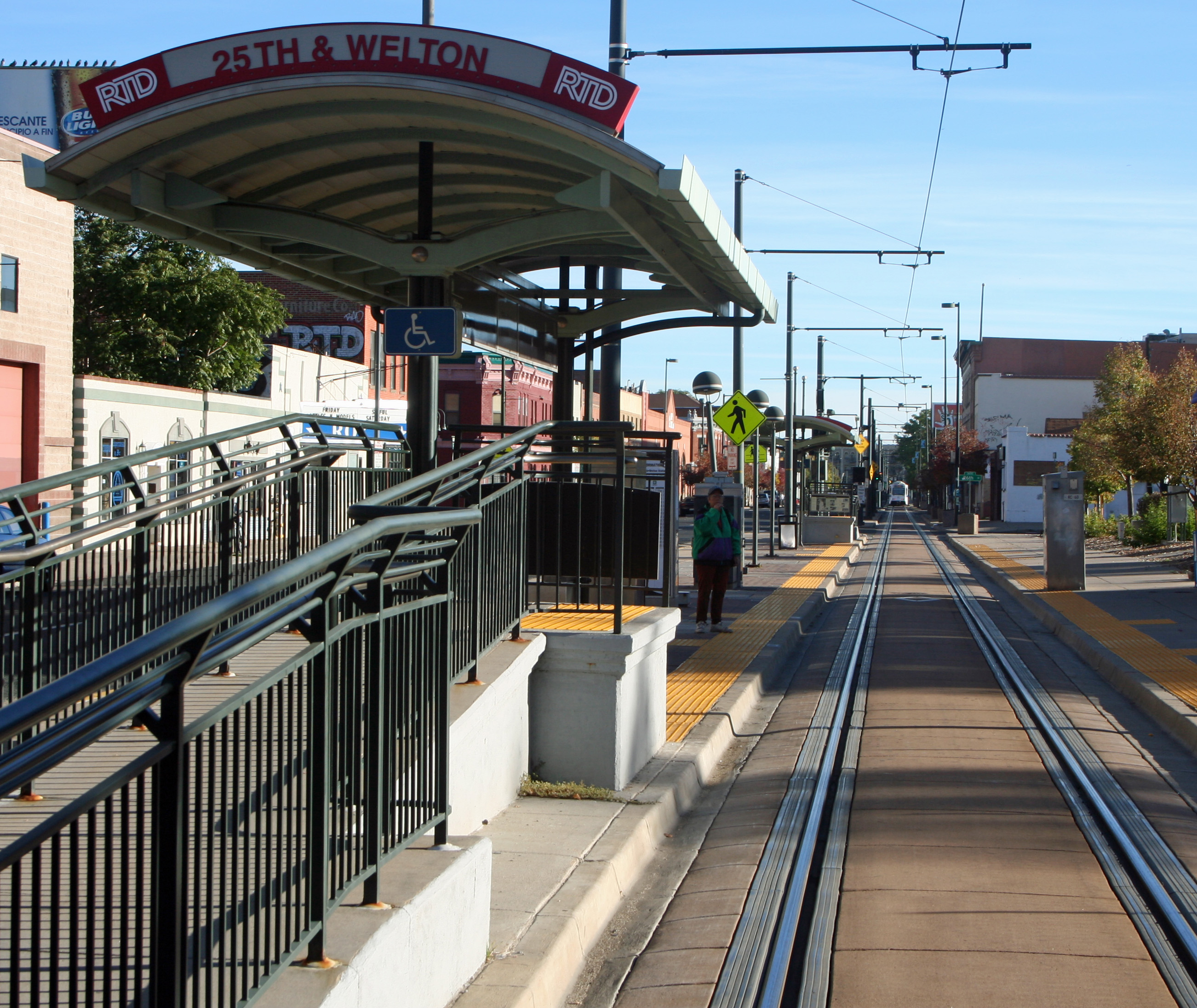
- 25th & Welton light rail station

General information
- Location: 2550 Welton Street; Denver, Colorado
- Coordinates: 39.753378°N 104.97975°W
- Owner: Regional Transportation District
- Line: Central Corridor
- Platforms: 2 side platforms
- Tracks: 1

Construction
- Structure type: At-grade
- Accessible: Yes

History
- Opened: October 8, 1994

Passengers
- 2025: 176 (average daily)
- Rank: 72 out of 75

Services
Preceding station	RTD	Following station
27th & Welton toward 30th & Downing	L Line Suspended	20th & Welton toward I-25 & Broadway
Location

25th & Welton station (sometimes styled as 25th•Welton) is a RTD light rail station in Denver, Colorado, United States. Originally operating as part of the D Line, the station was opened on October 8, 1994, and is operated by the Regional Transportation District. Located in the Five Points neighborhood, it is the stop closest to the Blair-Caldwell African American Research Library. The January 14, 2018, service changes introduced the L Line, which replaced D Line service.

== Station layout ==
1F

Platform Level

Side platform, doors will open on both sides
← toward 30th & Downing (27th & Welton) or toward 16th & Stout (20th & Welton) →
Side platform, doors will open on both sides
← Welton Street (one way)

25th & Welton is a single-track, dual-platform station. The L Line narrows to a single track just southwest of the station, and remains a single track to 30th & Downing. Northbound trains entering must hold short until a southbound train clears the station.
