= Thwaite Priory =

Monastery at Welton le Marsh in Lincolnshire, England

Coordinates: 53°12′20″N 0°11′31″E

Thwaite Priory was a monastery at Welton le Marsh in Lincolnshire, England. It was a house of Augustinian Canons Regular, dependent on Thornton Abbey, founded before 1440 and thought to have been dissolved before 1536.

Part of the remains were incorporated into an 18th-century cottage named Thwaite Hall. It is now a Grade II listed building.
