= Denver Post Tournament =

The Denver Post Tournament was organized in the 1920s to be "the World Series of semi-pro baseball." The event was sponsored by the Denver Post and featured ten invited teams. In 1934, Negro league players began to participate, starting with the Kansas City Monarchs and the Denver White Elephants.

The tournament ended in the 1940s.

== Participating players ==
- Sammy Bankhead
- Sammy Baugh
- Cool Papa Bell
- Josh Gibson
- Lonnie Goldstein
- Sammy Hale
- Buster Haywood
- Vic Harris
- Rogers Hornsby
- Sammy T. Hughes
- Buck Leonard
- Leroy Matlock
- Satchel Paige
- Pat Patterson
- Bill Perkins
- John Pickett
- Felton Snow
- Bill Wright
