= Buster Haywood =

- Catcher / Manager
- Born: January 12, 1910; Portsmouth, Virginia, U.S.
- Died: April 19, 2000 (aged 90); Los Angeles, California, U.S.
- Batted: Right Threw: Right

Negro league baseball debut
- 1940, for the Birmingham Black Barons

Last appearance
- 1954, for the Memphis Red Sox
- Stats at Baseball Reference

Teams
- Birmingham Black Barons (1940); New York Cubans (1942); Cincinnati/Indianapolis Clowns (1943-1953); Memphis Red Sox (1954)

Albert Elliott "Buster" Haywood (January 12, 1910 – April 19, 2000) was an American Negro league baseball player and manager. He played for the Clowns in both Indianapolis and Cincinnati, the Birmingham Black Barons, and the New York Cubans. He won Most Valuable Player of the 1941 Denver Post Tournament. He worked a player/manager of the Clowns and was Hank Aaron's first professional manager. He also managed the Memphis Red Sox in 1954.
