= 30th & Downing station =

Light rail station in Denver, Colorado

30th•Downing
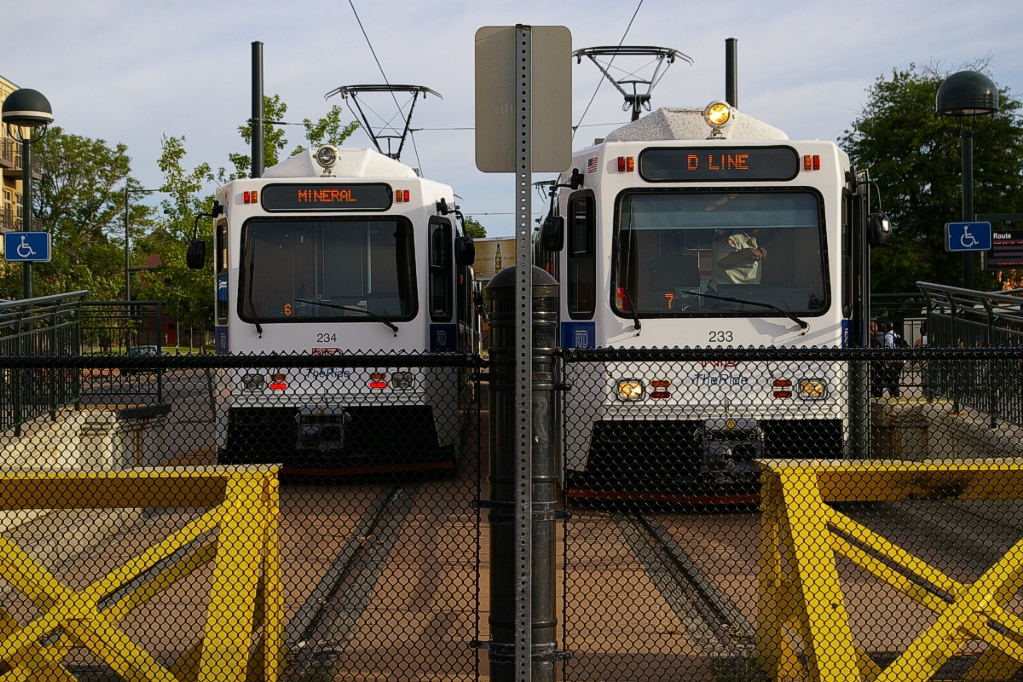
- 30th & Downing station in June 2007

General information
- Location: 2999 Downing Street; Denver, Colorado
- Coordinates: 39.758805°N 104.973536°W
- Owner: Regional Transportation District
- Line: Central Corridor
- Platforms: 2 side platforms
- Tracks: 2
- Connections: RTD Bus: 12, 28, 38, 43

Construction
- Structure type: At-grade
- Parking: 27 spaces
- Cycle facilities: 10 racks, 8 lockers
- Accessible: Yes

History
- Opened: October 8, 1994

Passengers
- 2025: 411 (average daily)
- Rank: 62 out of 75

Services
Preceding station	RTD	Following station
Terminus	L Line	27th & Welton toward I-25 & Broadway
Location

30th & Downing station (sometimes styled as 30th•Downing) is a RTD light rail station in the Five Points neighborhood of Denver, Colorado, United States. Originally operating as part of the D Line, the station was opened on October 8, 1994, and is operated by the Regional Transportation District. The January 14, 2018, service changes introduced the L Line, which replaced the D Line. It is the current northern terminus of the L Line.

== Station layout ==
1F

Platform Level

Downing Street
Side platform, doors will open on the right
Southbound
toward 16th & Stout (27th & Welton) →
Southbound
toward 16th & Stout (27th & Welton) →
Side platform, doors will open on the left
California Street; bus bays; parking

The L Line narrows to a single track just southwest of the station and remains a single track past 25th & Welton. Departing southbound trains cannot leave the station until a northbound train has arrived at the opposite platform. FasTracks provisions for the line to be extended eight blocks north along Downing Street to 38th & Blake, where it would terminate at the A Line and provide a connection to Denver International Airport. As of 2026, there is no estimated completion date for this extension.
