= Rossonian Hotel =

- U.S. National Register of Historic Places
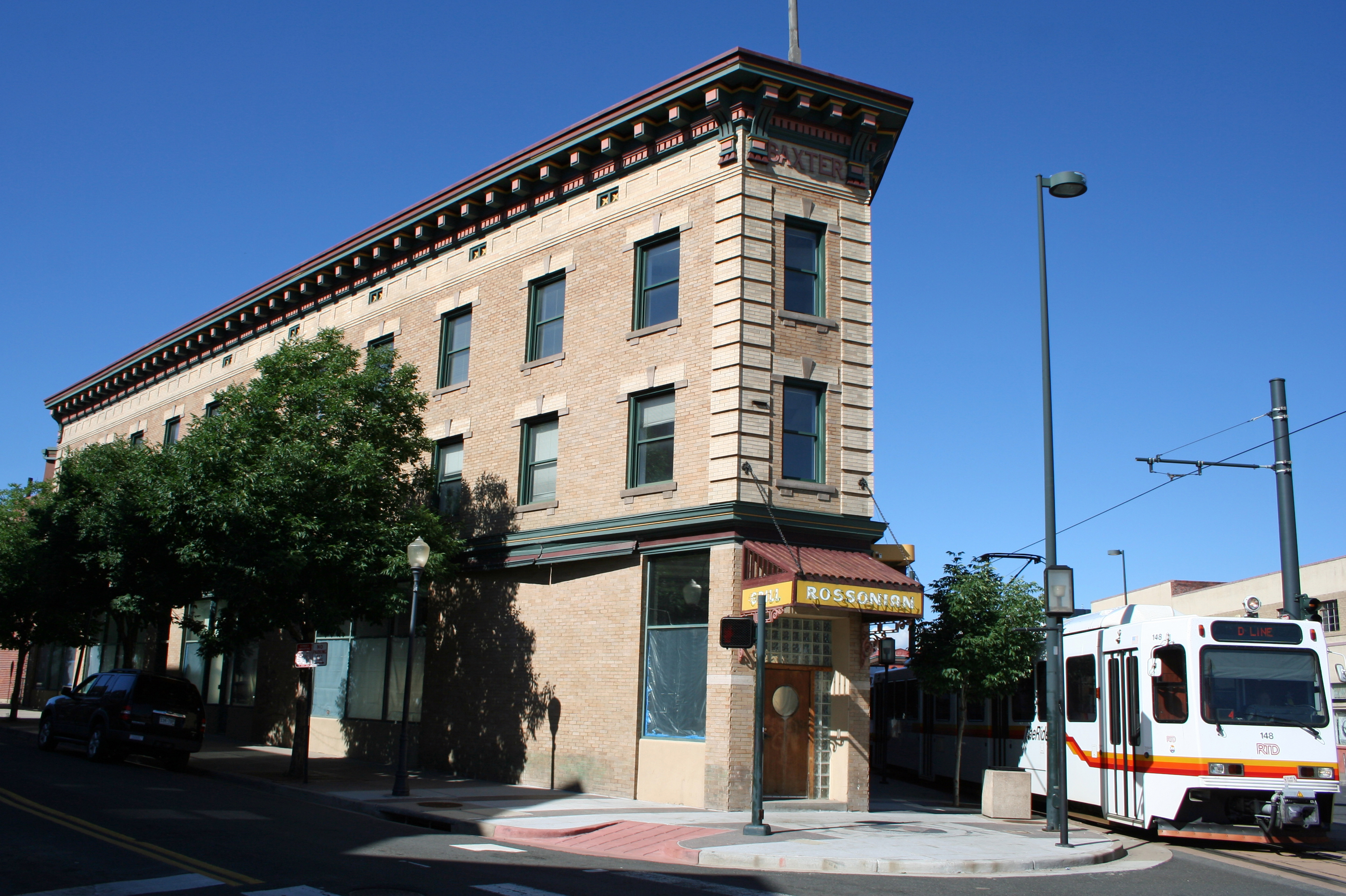

- Location within Colorado
- Location: 2650 Welton Street, Denver, Colorado, U.S.
- Coordinates: 39°45′15″N 104°58′40″W
- Area: less than one acre
- Architect: George Louis Bettcher
- Architectural style: Late 19th and Early 20th Century American Movements, Beaux-Arts
- NRHP reference No.: 95001009
- Added to NRHP: August 15, 1995

The Rossonian Hotel is a historic building and former business located at 2650 Welton Street in the Five Points section of Denver, Colorado, United States. It is listed on the National Register of Historic Places since in 1995, for ethnic heritage and social history. It has also been known as the Baxter Building and as the Baxter Hotel.

== History ==
The former Rossonian Hotel is a historic building which opened in 1912 as the Baxter Hotel. It was home to a jazz lounge where many prominent musicians performed. They were able to stay at the hotel which catered to African Americans during the era of segregation. In 1929, the hotel name changed to The Rossonian, and was named after the hotel manager, Albert Henderson Wade Ross (A. H. W. Ross) (1884–1939). Some sources state that Ross owned the Rossonian starting in either 1928 or 1929, and others state he owned it in the mid-1930s. Ross had owned the Denver White Elephants, a semi-professional baseball team. The hotel ownership and management changed multiple times between 1929 and 1945.

The building has been empty since 1998. Chauncy Billups was a partner in one redevelopment proposal. It has had various owners and redevelopment plans have been launched but as of 2021 none had been successfully completed. In 2024, plans to renovate the hotel were approved.

== Architecture ==
The building was designed by architect George Louis Bettcher (1862–1952), for cigar businessman Robert Y. Baxter. Bettcher was born in Jersey City, New Jersey and moved to Denver in 1895 where he remained until his death. Bettcher also designed residences in the Denver Country Club area and the Turnverein Building.

The building was built in 1907, and was opened in 1912. It is on a wedge of property and is triangular shaped. According to the Denver Architecture Foundation, it is Beaux-Arts in style. The Rossonian's main entrance is on Welton Street.

== See also ==
- National Register of Historic Places listings in downtown Denver
- Charles Burrell (musician), who played in the house band
