= 20th & Welton station =

Light rail station in Denver, Colorado

20th•Welton
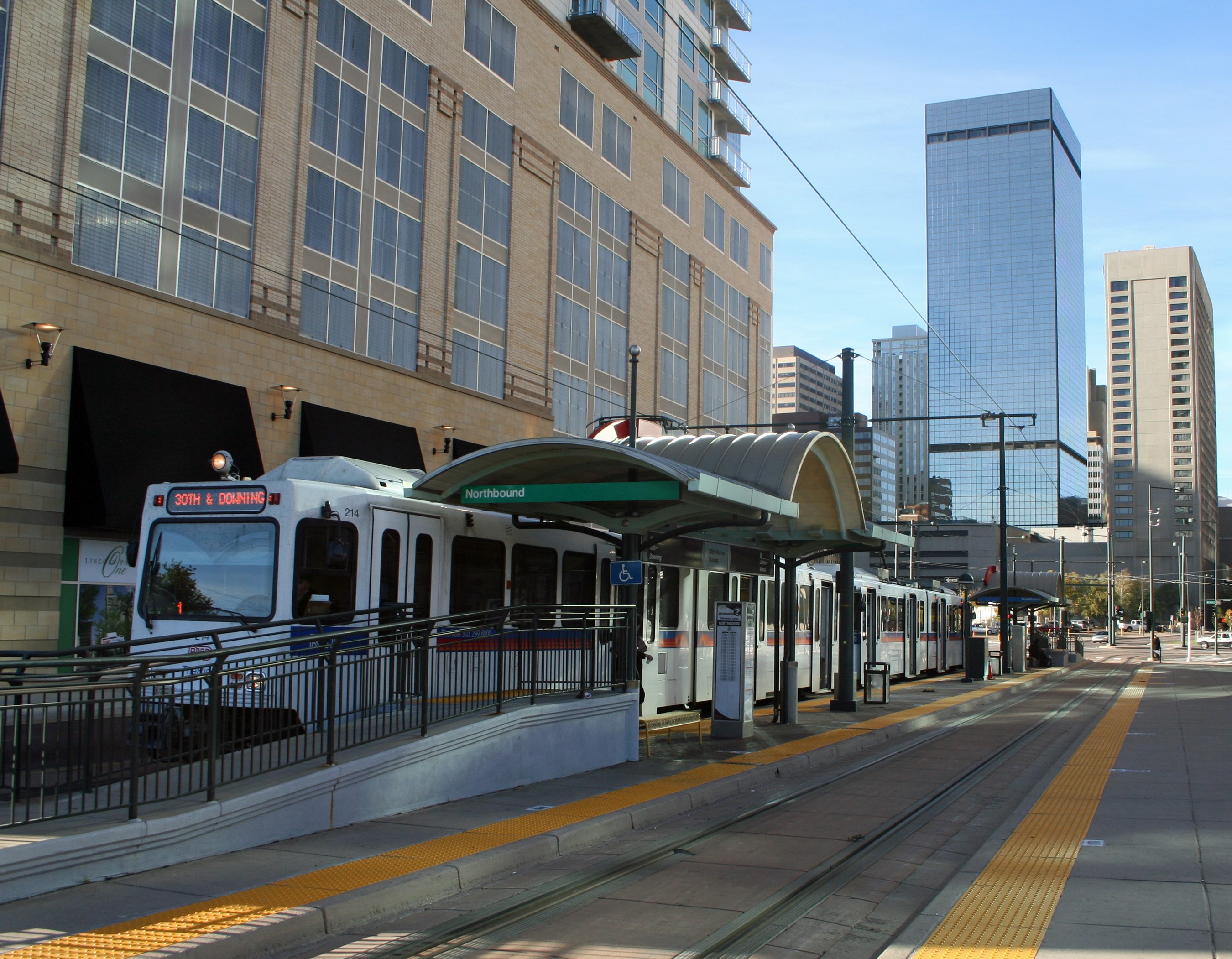
- 20th & Welton light rail station

General information
- Location: 1960 Welton Street; Denver, Colorado
- Coordinates: 39.747932°N 104.986895°W
- Owner: Regional Transportation District
- Line: Central Corridor
- Platforms: 1 island platform
- Tracks: 2

Construction
- Structure type: At-grade
- Accessible: Yes

History
- Opened: October 8, 1994

Passengers
- 2025: 157 (average daily)
- Rank: 73 out of 75

Services
Preceding station	RTD	Following station
25th & Welton toward 30th & Downing	L Line Suspended	18th & California/Stout toward I-25 & Broadway
Location

20th & Welton station (sometimes styled as 20th•Welton) is an island platformed RTD light rail station in Denver, Colorado, United States. Originally operating as part of the D Line, the station was opened on October 8, 1994, and is operated by the Regional Transportation District. It is the southernmost station on the Five Points branch. The January 14, 2018 service changes introduced the L Line, which replaced D Line service.

== Station layout ==
1F

Platform Level

← Welton Street (one way)
Northbound
← toward 30th & Downing (25th & Welton)
Island platform, doors will open on the left
Southbound
toward 16th & Stout (18th & Stout) →

20th & Welton is the third least-used station in the RTD rail network, with a daily average of 157 passengers as of 2025.
