= 27th & Welton station =

Light rail station in Denver, Colorado

27th•Welton
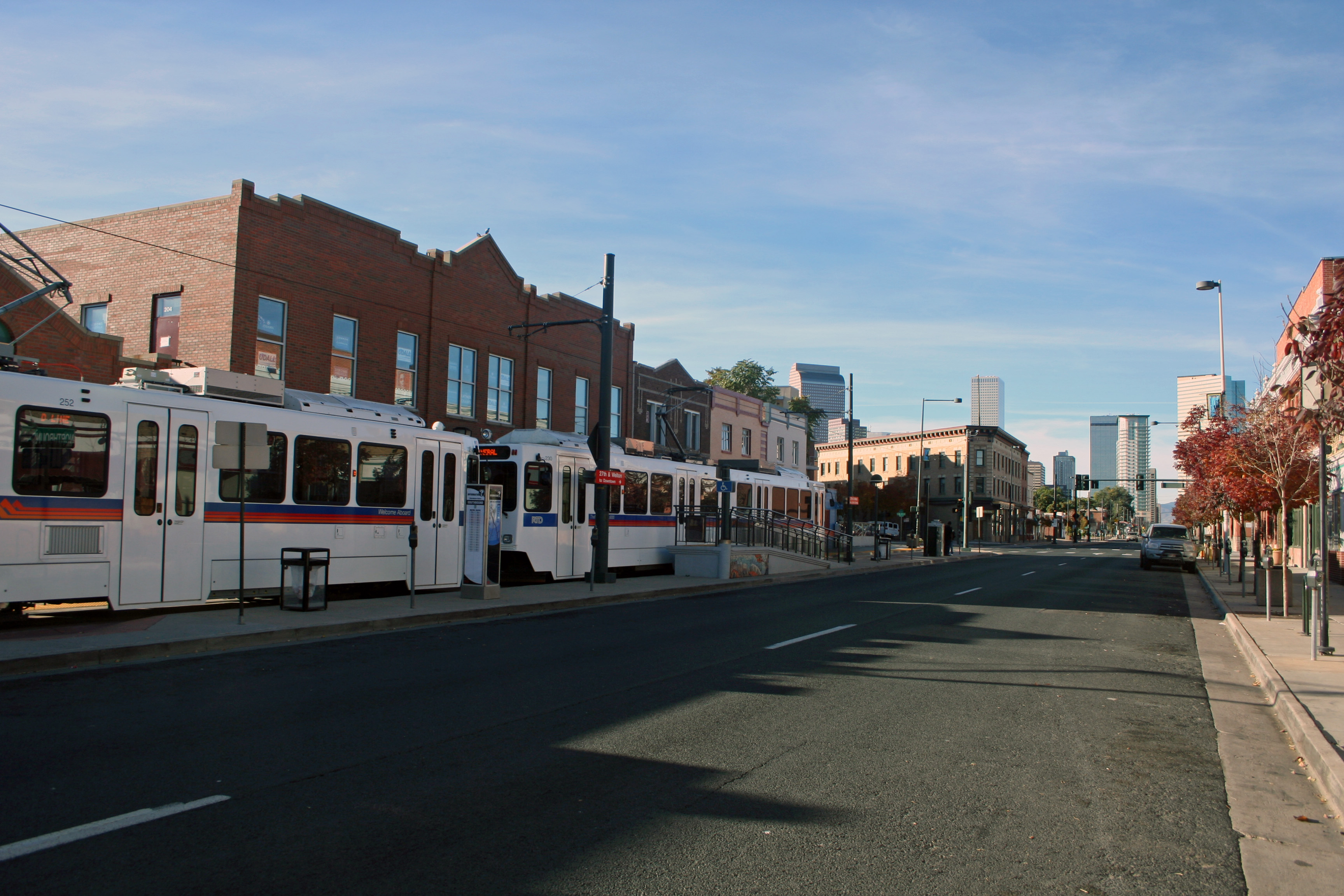
- 27th & Welton light rail station in Denver, Welton Street is the street in the foreground, and the view on the right is towards downtown

General information
- Location: 2720 Welton Street; Denver, Colorado
- Coordinates: 39.755234°N 104.977372°W
- Owner: Regional Transportation District
- Line: Central Corridor
- Platforms: 2 side platforms
- Tracks: 1

Construction
- Structure type: At-grade
- Accessible: Yes

History
- Opened: December 19, 1995

Passengers
- 2025: 149 (average daily)
- Rank: 74 out of 75

Services
Preceding station	RTD	Following station
30th & Downing Terminus	L Line Suspended	25th & Welton toward I-25 & Broadway
Location

27th & Welton station (sometimes styled as 27th•Welton) is a RTD light rail station in the Five Points neighborhood of Denver, Colorado, United States. Originally operating as part of the D Line, the station was opened on December 19, 1995, and is operated by the Regional Transportation District. The stop was opened over a year after the rest of light rail line after support from the neighborhood. The January 14, 2018, service changes introduced the L Line, which replaced the D Line.

== Station layout ==
1F

Platform Level

Side platform, doors will open on both sides
← toward 30th & Downing (Terminus) or toward 16th & Stout (25th & Welton) →
Side platform, doors will open on both sides
← Welton Street (one way)

Like 25th & Welton, 27th & Welton is a single-track, dual-platform station. There are no shelters at the station and there are no dedicated station amenities. Typical RTD rail signage is absent. A red sign attached to a pole denotes the station name and the directions of travel. 27th & Welton is the second least-used in the RTD rail network, only to Lone Tree City Center, with a daily average of 149 passengers as of 2025.
