= Thomas Albright =

American baseball player (1909–1986)

- Pitcher
- Born: December 23, 1909; Crockett, Texas, U.S.
- Died: June 29, 1986 (aged 76); Denver, Colorado, U.S.
- Batted: Right Threw: Right

Negro league baseball debut
- 1929, for the Bacharach Giants

Last appearance
- 1936, for the New York Cubans
- Stats at Baseball Reference

Teams
- Bacharach Giants (1929); New York Cubans (1936)

Thomas A. "Pistol Pete" Albright (December 23, 1909 – June 29, 1986) was an American professional baseball pitcher in the Negro leagues. He played with the Bacharach Giants in 1929 and the New York Cubans in 1936.
