= Blair-Caldwell African American Research Library =

Library branch in Denver Colorado, US

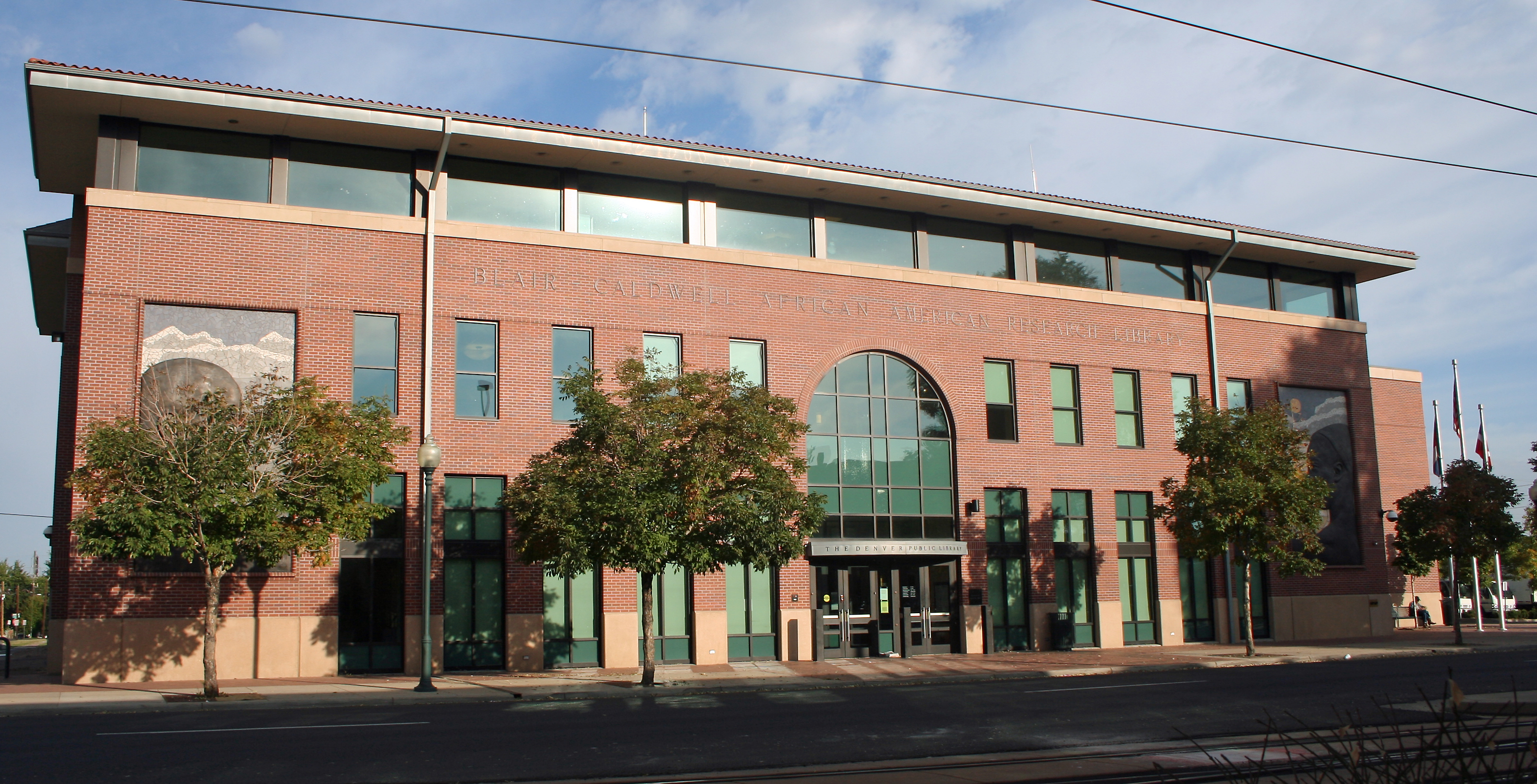
- The library in Five Points, Denver.
- 39.7524°N 104.9815°W
- Location: 2401 Welton Street; Denver CO 80205, United States
- Type: Public library and research library
- Established: 2003
- Branch of: Denver Public Library

Collection
- Items collected: All formats

Access and use
- Population served: Five Points neighborhood

Other information
- Website: aarl.denverlibrary.org

The Blair-Caldwell African American Research Library is a branch of the Denver Public Library in Denver, Colorado, in the United States that opened in 2003 and serves the Five Points neighborhood. It is also a research library with collections focusing on the history of African Americans in Denver and the American West. As of 2017, the library sees 135,000 visitors a year, including school groups visiting the third-floor museum. The library’s mission is to “collect and preserve the history and culture of African Americans in Colorado and throughout the Rocky Mountain West.”

== Library history ==
The library was conceived in 1999 by Denver's first African American mayor, Wellington Webb, and his wife Wilma Webb, who observed that the history of African Americans in Denver and the American West was under-represented. They hoped to create “a place where people, especially young people of African descent, could learn more about their history as residents of the West.” The historically diverse Denver neighborhood of Five Points, also home to the Black American West Museum, was chosen for the library’s location. Groundbreaking occurred in early 2002 and the library opened its doors on April 26, 2003. As of 2017, it was one of only four African American research libraries in the country.

Wellington and Wilma Webb worried that the history, culture, and contributions of African Americans to Colorado and the West, much of which was in private hands or not written down at all, would be lost to time. During Webb’s third term in office, they began to bring to life their vision for a collection representing the African American experience in the West. Webb said, “There’s so much history, and we need to capture that for young people. So much of it is in boxes, in basements, or in our heads.” In 2000, Denver library staff began collecting “personal and professional papers, publications, photographs, works of art and other memorabilia of distinguished African Americans from all walks of life.” Donations were received from across the state and Webb contributed much of his personal collection to the effort.

The library was designated the Blair-Caldwell African American Research Library in honor of Omar Blair and Elvin Caldwell, notable African Americans in the Denver community. Omar Blair was a WWII officer and Tuskegee Airman, and in 1973 he became the first black president of the Denver school board. According to the Denver Public Library, his most-remembered legacy is helping to desegregate Denver’s schools. Elvin Caldwell was elected Denver’s first black city council member in 1955, making him the first African American city council member west of the Mississippi. He served on the Denver city council for 28 years, including a five-year term as president, and he battled discrimination in the Denver police and fire departments and on the golf course, fought for economic and housing development, and was an advocate for Denver’s children.

== Visiting the library ==
The 40,000 square foot library contains three floors. The first level is a full-service branch library of the Denver Public Library with an entry gallery and exhibition areas; conference, meeting, and study rooms; and a collection of more than 35,000 books, magazines, and audiovisual materials in English and Spanish.

The second level houses collection archives and a research library including rare books; photographs, manuscripts, letters, and diaries; historic newspapers; listening and viewing areas for taking in oral histories; papers and doctoral theses on microfilm; a research area and study space; archival storage space; and a gallery for programs by musicians, artists, and scholars. The second floor also features rotating artifact exhibits. As of 2018, the library provided digital access to over 90 archival collections.

The third level is a 7,000 square foot museum that houses exhibits about the history of African Americans in Denver and in the Western United States. “Beginning in the 16th century southwest, stories that stretch from Mexico to Canada are presented here." A highlight of the collection is the original 1834 manumission papers of emancipated Virginia slave Robert Smith and his family.

The exhibits include the desk that Wellington Webb used during his term as Denver's mayor as well as a tribute to Denver’s past mayors and a history of the Five Points neighborhood “from its beginning as a suburb for Denver's well-to-do to its heyday as the center of Denver's black community to its rebirth today as a multicultural neighborhood.” The third floor also houses the Charles and Dorothy Cousins Changing Gallery, which features the work of local Denver artists as well as national exhibits.

The library offers tours as well as speaking engagements for groups. Library-goers can also take a self-guided walking tour within the Welton Street Cultural District that features illustrated signs telling the story of African Americans in Colorado.
