= Five Points, Denver =

Neighborhood in Denver, Colorado

Five Points
- Neighborhood
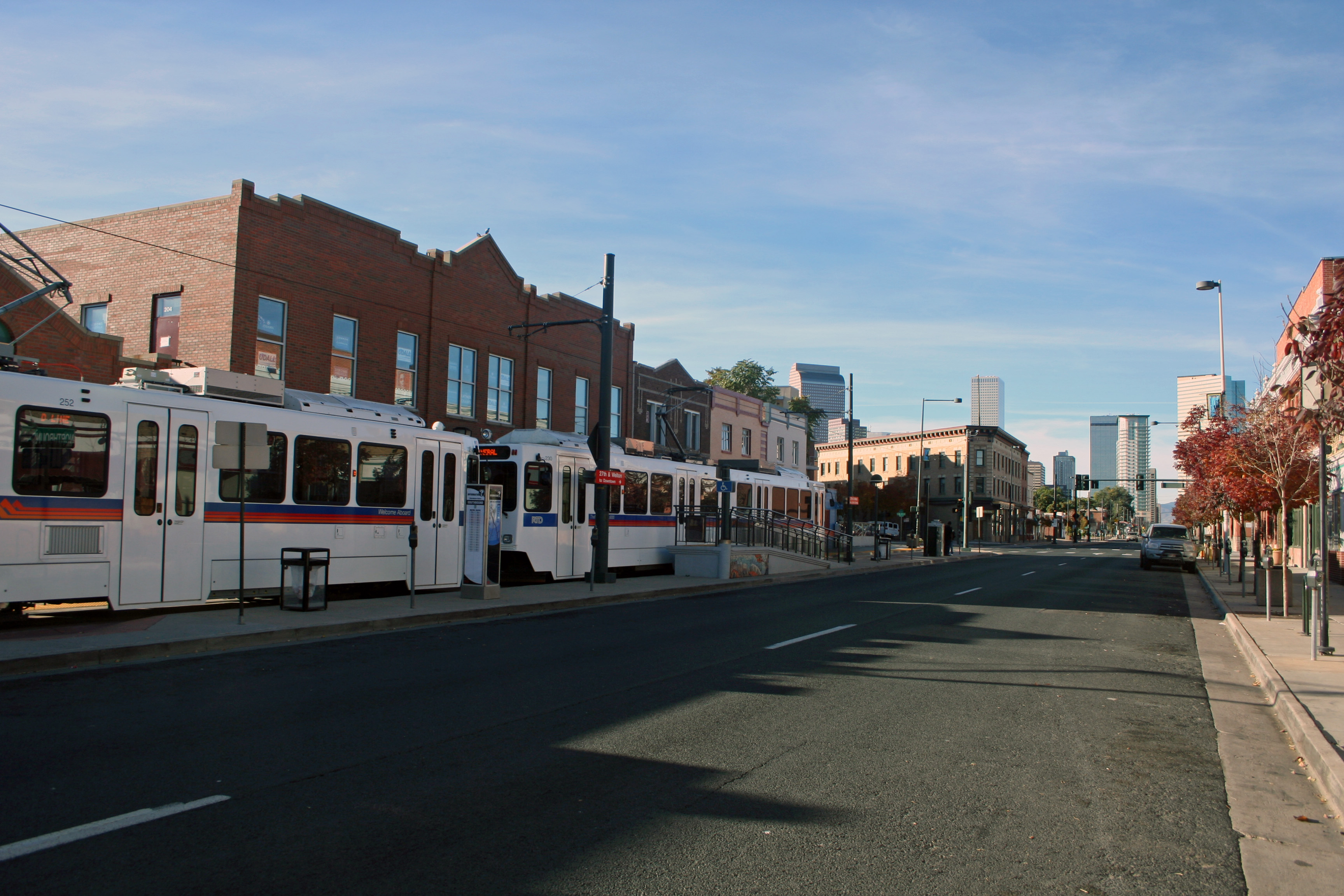
- Light rail station at Five Points Plaza on Welton Street
- Interactive map of Five Points
- Coordinates: 39.7547°N 104.9781°W
- Country: United States of America
- State: Colorado
- City: Denver

Area
  - Total: 1.5 sq mi (3.9 km^{2})
- Elevation: 5,226 ft (1,593 m)

Population (2020)
  - Total: 17,520
  - Density: 11,680/sq mi (4,510/km^{2})
- ZIP Codes: 80205, 80216

Five Points is one of the oldest neighborhoods in Denver, Colorado. It is now one of the fastest growing in terms of both redevelopment and population. Much of this growth is taking place in the River North Arts District, or "RiNo", which is often considered by locals a neighborhood of its own; although it is officially within the Five Points neighborhood in addition to parts of neighboring Globeville and Elyria-Swansea.

== Geography ==
Five Points is on the northeast side of Downtown Denver's central business district. A small portion wraps around Coors Field and encompasses the Union Station North neighborhood (formerly Prospect). This is where the downtown street grid meets the neighborhood street grid of the first Denver suburbs. The five points in the district's name refer to the vertices formed where four streets meet: 26th Avenue, 27th Street, Washington Street, and Welton Street. Five Points was the shortened name for the street car stop at this intersection.

== History ==
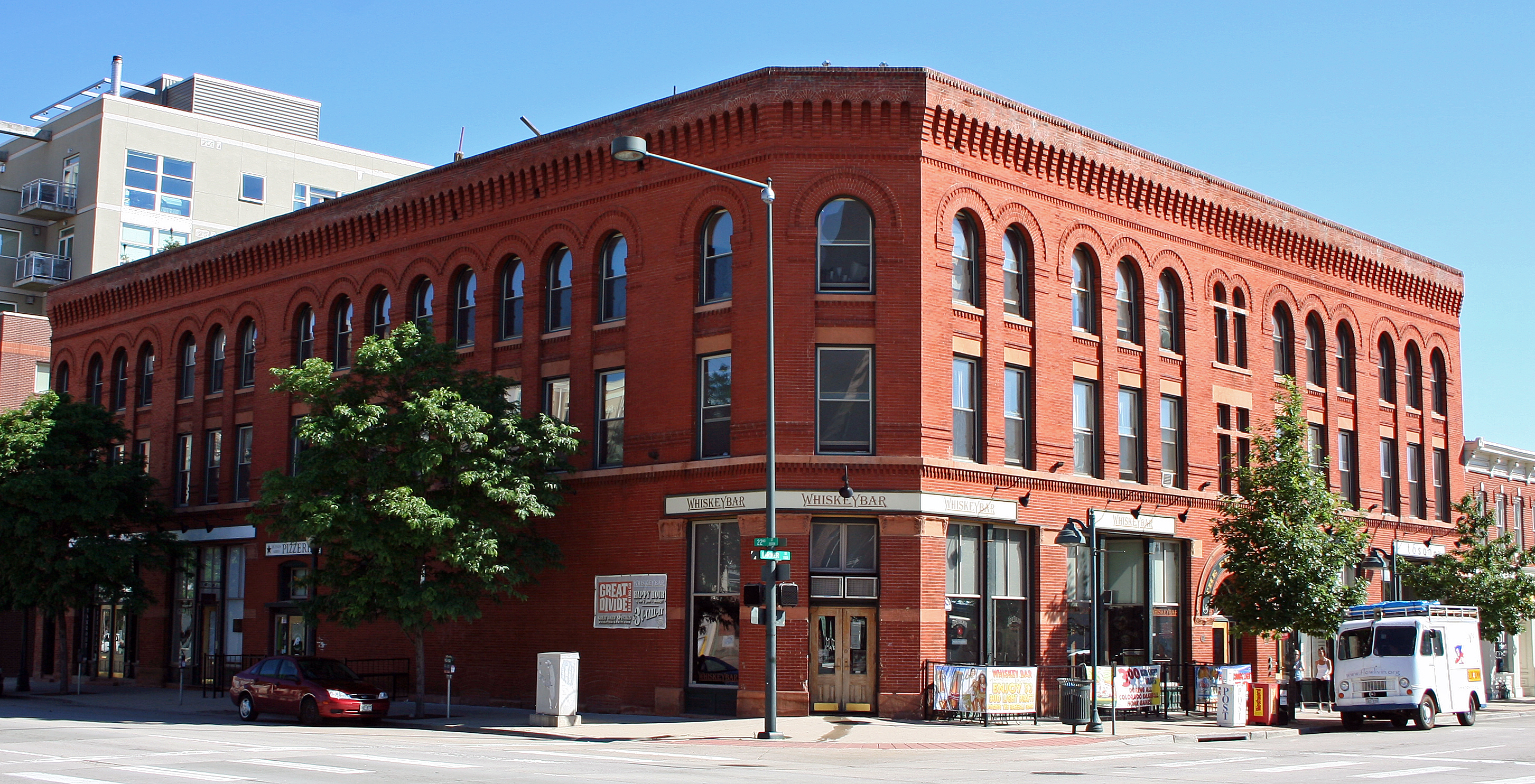
Historic Burlington Hotel built in 1891

Five Points came to historical prominence from the 1860s through the 1950s. The neighborhood was home to a number of Denver's leaders, housing mayors, governors, and prominent business people, as well as middle-class laborers. Rino, Union Station North, Clement, Old San Rafael, Curtis Park, Arapahoe Square, and Ballpark neighborhoods are located within the boundaries of the larger Five Points neighborhood.

With a succession of majority African-American populations as new residents settled in the city, Five Points in the first half of the 20th century became known as the "Harlem of the West". It developed as a predominantly African-American neighborhood because discriminatory home sale laws in other areas excluded black people. African Americans migrated to the city, many first working for the railroad, which had a terminus here. They were part of the Great Migration of the 20th century out of the rural South to northern, midwestern and western industrial cities for jobs and other opportunities.

From the 1920s to the 1950s the community thrived, with a rich mix of business and commerce along the Welton Corridor. Businesses included a butcher, real estate companies, drug stores, tailors, restaurants, barbers, and many other main street services. Churches were also founded in the community.

Welton Street was also home to more than fifty bars and clubs, where nationally known jazz musicians, such as Billie Holiday, Duke Ellington, Miles Davis, Nat King Cole, Count Basie, Dizzy Gillespie and others performed. Black performers excluded from other hotels in Denver stayed at the Rossonian Hotel, built in 1912. They also performed there and it became known as a famous music venue.

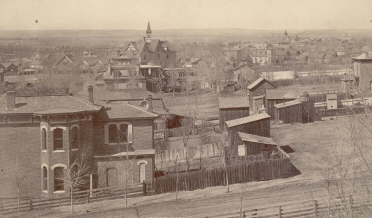
Five Points district c. 1885

From the late 1950s through the late 1990s, the Five Points community suffered changes and decline as wealthier residents moved to newer housing in the postwar suburban boom. In addition, the growth of drugs was associated with crime and urban flight. Suburban housing and retail development drew many people out of the neighborhood. As the population declined, so did businesses, and many properties were abandoned. Redevelopment took place in other areas, as the larger market found local business conditions unappealing. Attempts at redevelopment were made, but there were many hindrances to reinvestment.

Five Points has long been a neighborhood with a diverse economic mix of residents, evidenced by the variety of houses there. Mansions were built next to row homes. Many of the rich began moving out of Five Points in the late 19th century to live in the more popular Capitol Hill neighborhood. Five Points at one time had a large Jewish population, formed by waves of immigration in the late 19th and early 20th centuries. A former synagogue, Temple Emanuel, stands on the corner of 24th and Curtis Street. The Jewish community founded Rose Hospital.

After World War II, many Japanese-Americans who had been interned in interior camps resettled in Denver and lived in Five Points. Agape Church on the corner of 25th Street and California Street was once a Japanese Methodist church.

In 2002 Five Points was designated as a cultural historic district, in recognition of its important role in African-American history in the city.

In 2013, Sonny Lawson Park, at Park Avenue West and Welton, was renovated with completion of new ball field fencing and facilities, addition of exercise equipment, and improvements to the layout of the park.

African-American history is recorded and exhibited at the Black American West Museum and Heritage Center and at the Blair-Caldwell African American Research Library.

== Demographics ==
Historical population
Year	Pop.	±%
2010	12,712	—
2020	17,520	+37.8%

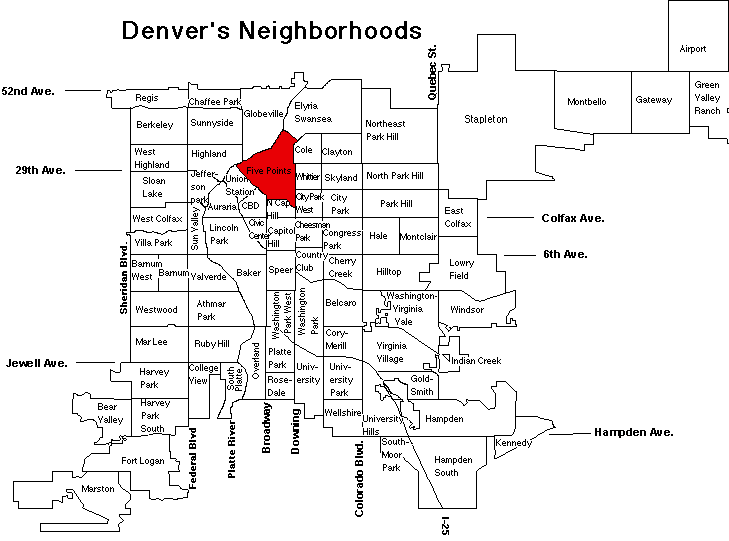
Location of Five Points in Denver

At one period, when segregation was the law, an area centered around the Welton Corridor had an African American-majority population. But according to the Census, years of demographic change have brought about a majority white population (77 percent), a large Latino population (19 percent), with the black population at a lower minority (14 percent). In 2002 Five Points was designated as a cultural historic district, in recognition of its important role in African-American history in the city.

== Economy ==
In 2002, the Denver Housing Authority acquired a 100-year-old horse barn in the Curtis Park neighborhood near Five Points. Developer Andrew Romanoff was in charge of a renovation in 2012 to adapt the building for use as office space, to be leased to small businesses. It has since opened.

Attempts to rebuild a strong business economy on Welton Street began in 2009 with the formation of the Five Points Business District. The Five Points Business District has since ceased operations and funding was directed to a business improvement district. In 2024, plans to renovate The Rossonian Hotel at 2642 Welton Street were approved.

== Arts and culture ==
=== Juneteenth ===
Denver's Juneteenth festival is considered to be one of the largest and longest running in the country and draws thousands of people every year. A parade starts at Manual High School and goes down to Welton Street. Vendors sell merchandise and street performers entertain the crowd.

=== Five Points Jazz Festival ===
Presented by Denver Arts & Venues, the Five Points Jazz Festival was a free, all-day event held annually in the neighborhood from 2003 to 2024. From its humble first year which featured one stage and only three bands, the festival grew into an all-day event with almost 50 bands, 10 stages and performance spaces and 100,000 visitors. In 2020, Denver Arts & Venues collaborated with Rocky Mountain PBS and KUVO to broadcast a virtual event that garnered two Colorado Broadcasters Association awards and a Heartland Emmy nomination.

==== History ====
The festival was launched in 2003 in the parking lot of the Blair-Caldwell African American Research Library, and despite being hit with a snowstorm was considered a success. By the 2020s, it had grown to be considered one of "two internationally-known annual celebrations" in Five Points, together with the Juneteeth Music Festival, and expanded to include a multitude of family oriented activities such as face painting and a pop-culture classroom.

==== Cultural Significance ====
The festival was viewed as a celebration of the musical and cultural history of the neighborhood, an effort to "re-create the energy of jazz in Five Points like it was decades ago", and something "important to [the Five Points] community and the jazz community” as a way to help preserve its history.

==== Grand Marshals and Honorees ====
Each year, the festival began with a parade led by grand marshals chosen for their cultural contributions. Notable figures that served as grand marshals included:

- Charles Burrell (musician), a pioneering bassist often referred to as the “Jackie Robinson of classical music.” He served as a grand marshal of the Five Points Jazz Festival.
- Cleo Parker Robinson, founder of the Cleo Parker Robinson Dance Ensemble and major figure in the Denver arts scene.
- Carlos Lando, longtime KUVO music director and advocate for Colorado jazz.

==== Closure ====
In 2024, the City of Denver announced that the festival would be discontinued and replaced by the Five Points Jazz Activation Fund, a grant program intended to support jazz performances and education in the neighborhood year-round. The city’s decision to discontinue the festival sparked a mixed response. While some applauded the new year-round support model, others criticized the loss of the festival.

== Transportation ==
Five Points is well serviced by both bus and light rail. In the early 1990s, Denver's first light rail system connected the downtown business district to Five Points. A new transit stop was constructed at 38th and Blake in 2016 as part of the A Line. Nowadays Five Points is primarily served by the L Line, which was created by reworking parts of the already existing D Line. One of the few remaining sections of Denver metro's RTD's FasTracks expansion plan is the final 0.8 miles of the L line. This section would connect the L line to the A line at the 38th & Blake station and include two new stations at 33rd and Downing and 35th and Downing.

== See also ==
- Bibliography of Colorado
- Geography of Colorado
- History of Colorado
- Index of Colorado-related articles
- List of Colorado-related lists
  - List of neighborhoods in Denver
  - List of populated places in Colorado
  - List of U.S. communities with African-American majority populations in 2020
- Outline of Colorado
