= Alberto M. Carvalho =

American school superintendent

Alberto Carvalho
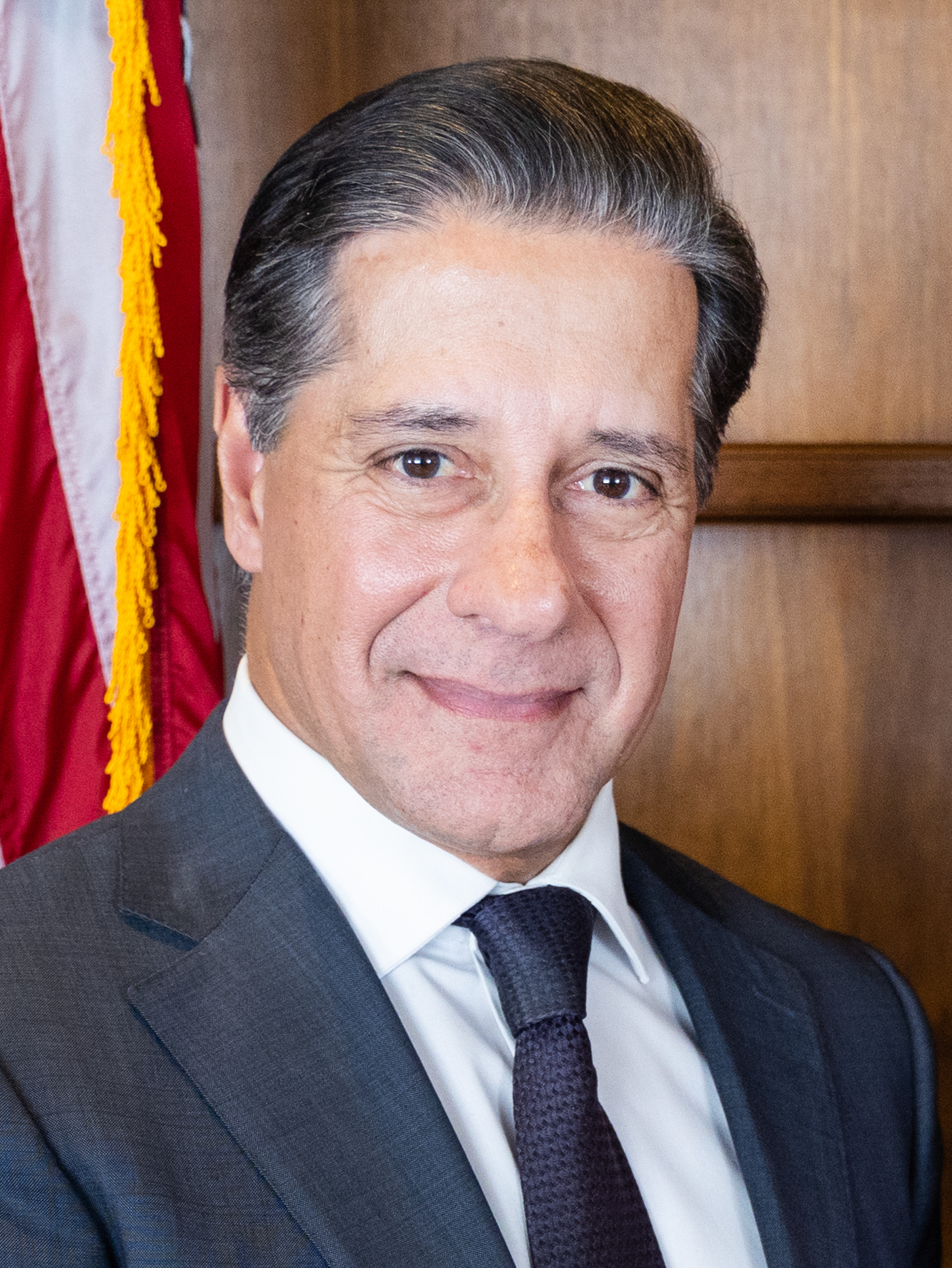
- Carvalho in 2023

14th Superintendent of the Los Angeles Unified School District
- In office February 14, 2022 – June 22, 2026; On leave: February 27, 2026 – June 22, 2026
- Preceded by: Megan Reilly (acting)
- Succeeded by: Andrés Chait

Superintendent of Miami-Dade County Public Schools
- In office September 10, 2008 – February 3, 2022
- Preceded by: Rudy Crew
- Succeeded by: José Dotres

Personal details
- Born: 1964 (age 61–62) Portugal
- Education: Broward College (attended); Barry University (BS)

Alberto M. Carvalho MedM (born 1965) is a Portuguese-American educator and the former superintendent of the Los Angeles Unified School District from 2022 to 2026. He served as superintendent of Miami-Dade County Public Schools (M-DCPS), the fourth-largest school district in the United States, beginning in 2008.

After a raid of the Los Angeles Unified School District office and his homes by the Federal Bureau of Investigation, he was placed on paid administrative leave on February 27, 2026. On June 21, 2026, he resigned.

== Early life and education ==
Carvalho was born in Portugal to a father who worked as a custodian and mother who worked as a seamstress. He grew up in Lisbon. He was one of six children and the only one to graduate high school. He described growing up there in "pretty dramatic poverty,” living "in a one-room apartment with no running water and no electricity."

He came to the United States after high school in the early 1980s. As an undocumented immigrant, he worked mostly in construction and restaurants (as a dishwasher) and was homeless for a time.

Carvalho attended Broward College and then Barry University, where in 1990 he graduated with a bachelor's degree in biology.

== Career ==
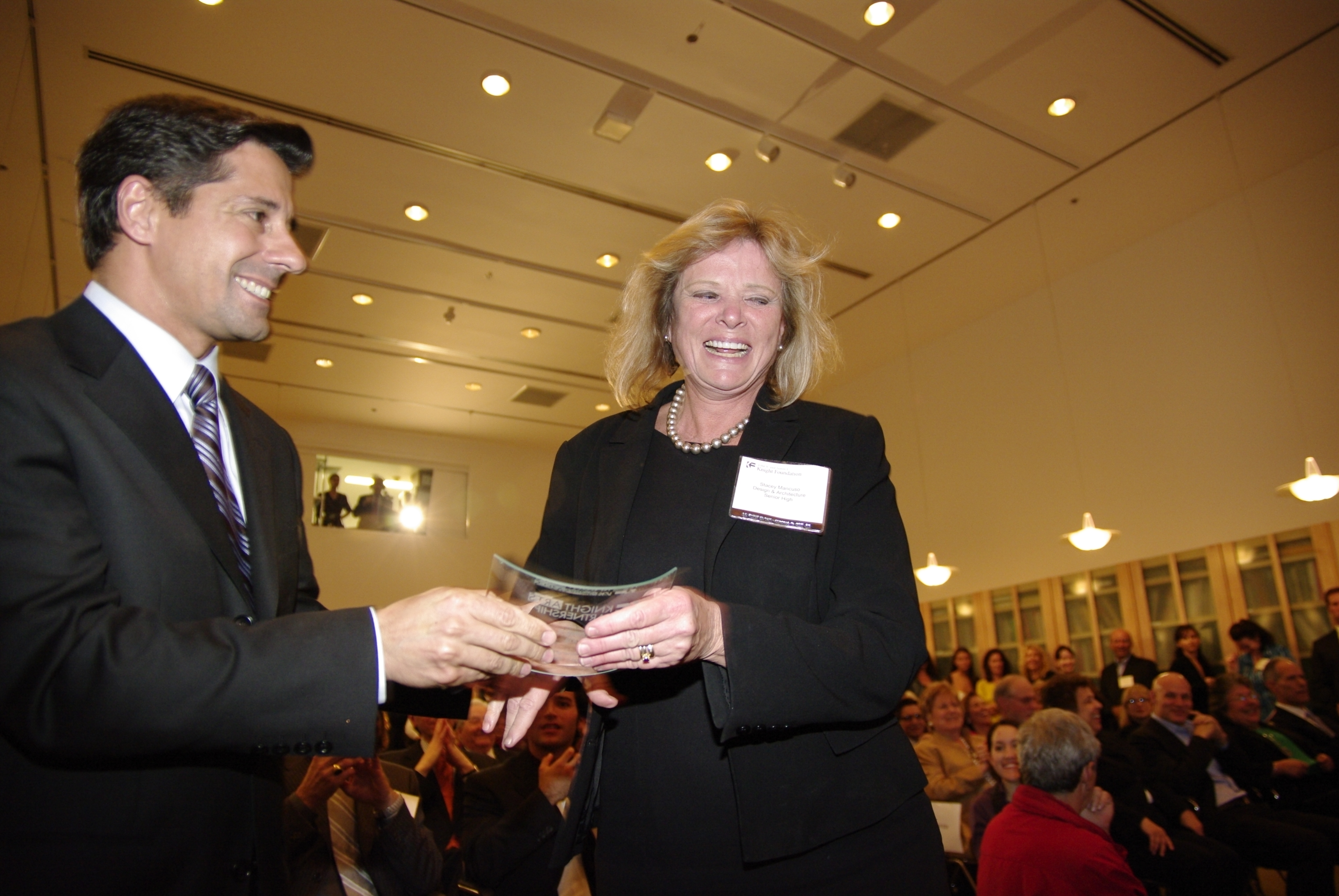
Carvalho awarding an award to Principal Stacey Mancuso in 2008.

Carvalho began his career in education as a physics, chemistry, and calculus teacher at Miami Jackson Senior High. He later became an assistant principal at the school. He also worked as principal, chief communications officer, a school district lobbyist, and assistant superintendent before being named superintendent of Miami-Dade County Public Schools (M-DCPS) in 2008, the fourth-largest school district in the United States, with over 346,000 students and 52,000 employees. At the time of his appointment, the district was reported to have been near bankruptcy. Carvalho worked to cut the budget by $2 billion, firing "massive numbers of administrators" but not one classroom teacher. He has described his approach as "zero-based, moral-values-based" budgeting.

In 2010, Carvalho was appointed the chairman of a taskforce aimed at improving teaching quality throughout Miami. Carvalho franchised MAST Academy, opening three new schools based on the original Virginia Key institution. In 2012, Carvalho served as President of the Association of Latino Administrators and Superintendents and is currently on the Board of Directors of The Children's Trust. Carvalho remained self-appointed principal of two schools that he opened: Primary Learning Center (2009), an elementary school, and iPreparatory Academy (2010), an experimental high school that he has called "my signature school."

He was implicated in a romantic relationship with Tania deLuzuriaga in 2008, a former Miami Herald education reporter while he was married.

In February 2014, the American Association of School Administrators (AASA) named Carvalho the 2014 National Superintendent of the Year. On February 28, 2018, New York City Mayor Bill de Blasio named Carvalho as the city's next Department of Education Chancellor, but he refused the offer the following day.

On December 9, 2021, Carvalho accepted the position of superintendent of the Los Angeles Unified School District following the resignation of Austin Beutner.

On February 25, 2026, Carvalho's residences in Miami and Los Angeles were raided by the Federal Bureau of Investigation (FBI) which appears to be related to his involvement in a failed chatbot program for the district named Ed. The FBI also raided the LAUSD's headquarters. After the raid, he was placed on paid administrative leave on February 27, 2026.

== Awards and recognition ==
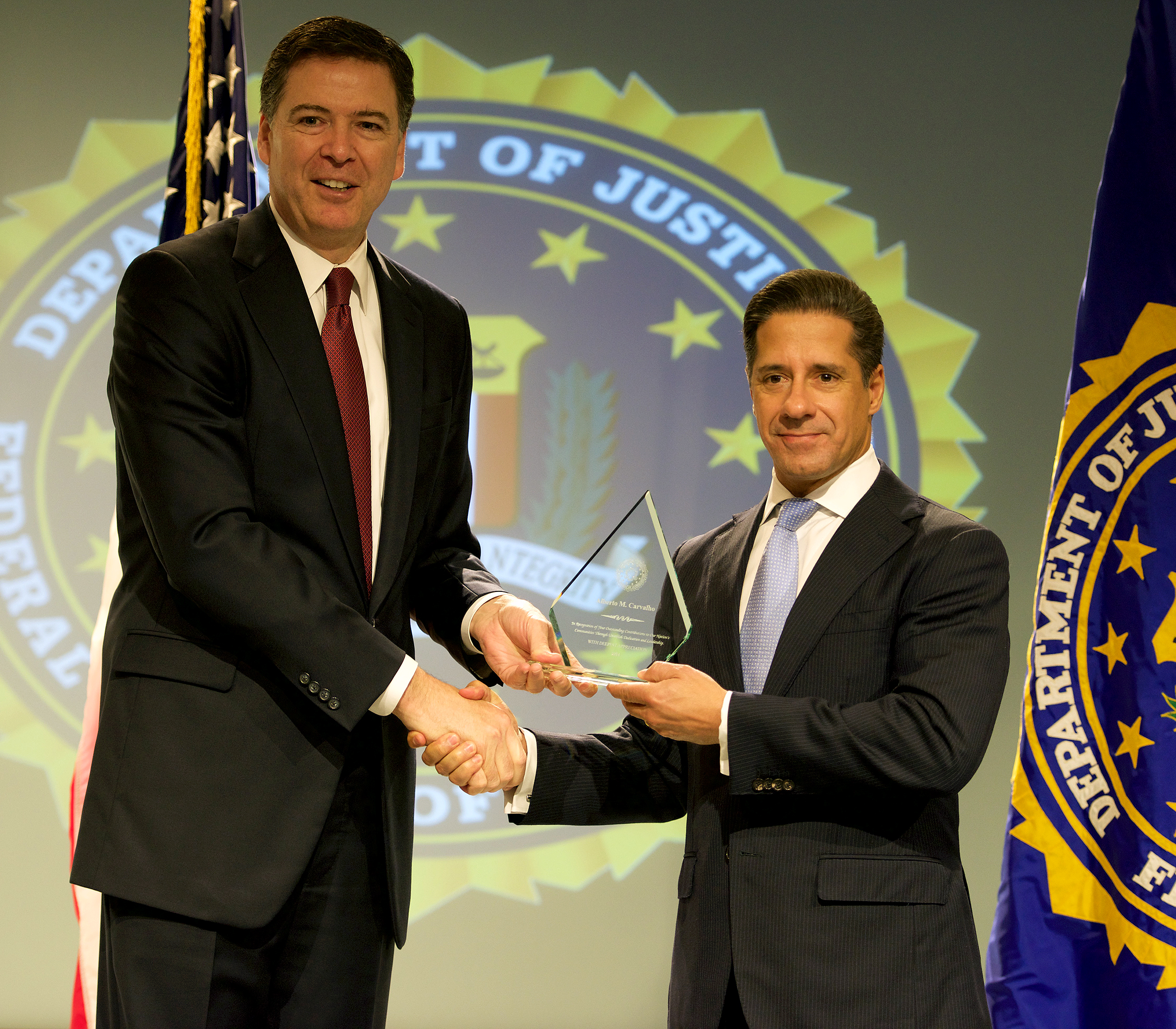
Carvalho receiving an award from James Comey, 2015.

In 2011, Carvalho was named one of the nation's Top 10 Tech-Savvy Superintendents by eSchool News. Under Carvalho's leadership as superintendent, the Miami-Dade County Public Schools won the Broad Prize for Urban Education in 2012. The district has also won awards for marked improvement in Advanced Placement participation and performance. In December 2013, he was named Florida's Superintendent of the Year. In February 2014, Carvalho was named the 2014 AASA National Superintendent of the Year during the organization's National Conference on Education. In May 2014, he was honored by President Barack Obama at a ceremony at the White House, along with the National Teacher of the Year and Principal of the Year winners.

He was also appointed to the National Assessment Governing Board by outgoing U.S. Secretary of Education Arne Duncan on October 6, 2015. The governing board sets policy for the National Assessment of Educational Progress, tests children take across the U.S. The tests, also known as NAEP, are often called “The Nation’s Report Card." In 2016, Carvalho was named the winner of the Harold W. McGraw, Jr. Prize in Education for K-12. He was also named the 2016 Magnet Schools of America (MSA) Superintendent of the Year.

Carvalho has been awarded several honorary degrees including a Doctor of Public Service by Florida International University; Doctor of Humane Letters by both Barry University and Florida Memorial University; and a Doctor of Pedagogy, Honoris Causa from Nova Southeastern University.
