= Ed (chatbot) =

Chatbot developed by the Los Angeles Unified School District

- Developers: Los Angeles Unified School District and AllHere Education
- Initial release: March 20, 2024
- Type: Chatbot
- Website: www.lausd.org/ed

Ed was a chatbot co-developed by the Los Angeles Unified School District and AllHere Education. Described as a learning acceleration platform, it was the first personal assistant for students in the United States. Part of the district's Individual Acceleration Plan, it was able to interact with students both verbally and visually, offering support in 100 languages. The chatbot was launched on March 20, 2024, as part of the district's plan for academic recovery from the COVID-19 pandemic and to improve overall academic performance. Utilizing artificial intelligence, Ed organizes data and reports on grades, test scores, and attendance, creating individualized plans for each student. After the company behind it, AllHere, collapsed, the district shuttered operations of the chatbot on June 14, 2024. The firm is under investigation by the US Federal Bureau of Investigation.

== History ==
On February 14, 2022, Alberto M. Carvalho became the Superintendent of the Los Angeles Unified School District, pledging to give the district a full academic recovery from the COVID-19 pandemic. In December 2022, he announced the Individual Acceleration Plan for the district, which aimed to provide each student with a unique progress report and help them determine if they were on track to graduate. The district faced criticism from disability advocates for its management of Individualized Education Programs, and in April 2022, the United States Department of Education announced that the district had failed to provide appropriate educational services to students with disabilities during the pandemic. The district had been grappling with significant absenteeism issues since the pandemic, which led to declining academic performance and disengagement among students. On February 17, 2023, the district issued a request for proposals to develop a fully integrated portal system. Later that year, they signed a $6 million, five-year contract with AllHere Education, a Boston-based company founded in 2016. The introduction of Ed follows the public launch of ChatGPT, which has been utilized by both teachers and students in educational settings.

On August 4, 2023, during an annual address at the Walt Disney Concert Hall, Carvalho and the Los Angeles Unified School District announced the launch of Ed. The district invested $4 million into the chatbot, with Carvalho noting that this cost would be halved thanks to donor and grant funding. The chatbot was launched on March 20, 2024. Following its launch, a press conference was held to address security and technology concerns. Carvalho stated that the district had collaborated with security companies and incorporated filters to screen for threatening language.

Months after its launch, AllHere Education furloughed most of its staff on June 14, citing their “current financial position” on its website as the reason. After learning about the furlough, the district terminated its dealings with AllHere Education. However, it stated its intention to bring the chatbot back in the future once officials determine the best course of action. Carvalho announced that he would appoint an independent task force to review what went wrong with AllHere Education and the chatbot.

On February 25, 2026, the FBI served a search warrant on Carvalho’s home and office in connection with AllHere. The FBI also raided the LAUSD's headquarters.

== Service ==
The chatbot was described as a personal assistant and a "one-stop shop for parents and students" who want to see information about a student's attendance and grades, as well as other resources from the district. Additionally, the application can function as an alarm clock, provide daily lunch menus from the school cafeteria, and offer updates on the location of school buses. The chatbot also helps students and parents who do not speak English as their first language by translating displayed information into approximately 100 different languages. The application can also help with submitting applications and give updates on progress and upcoming assignments. The district stated that the primary goal of Ed was to actively motivate students to complete homework and other tasks.

== Reception ==
The chatbot received a mostly positive reception among parents and observers upon its launch. Some parents and teachers expressed caution about the technology, voicing concerns that the district's push for its implementation lacked public accountability. Rob Nelson from the University of Pennsylvania described the district's strategy as risky, saying that the release felt "like the beginning of a Clippy-level disaster". After the chatbot's shutdown, The 74 criticized it for misusing student data. Chris Whiteley, a former software engineer at AllHere Education, alleged that the data collected by the chatbot likely violated the district's data privacy rules.
