= Ramón C. Cortines =

American educator (born 1932)

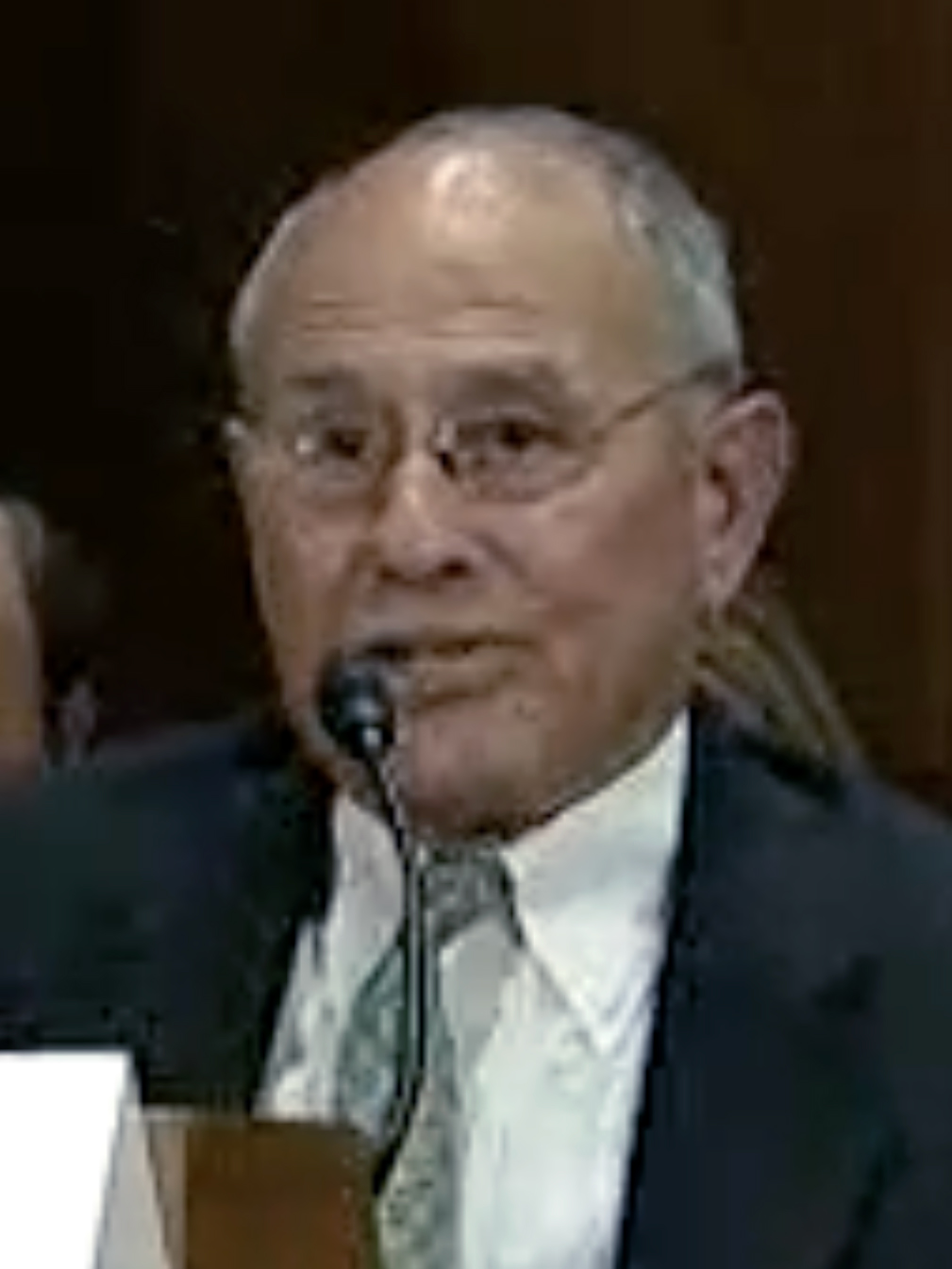
- Cortines in 2010

Superintendent of the Los Angeles Unified School District
- Acting; January 15, 2000 – June 7, 2000
- Preceded by: Ruben Zacarias
- Succeeded by: Roy Romer
- In office December 10, 2008 – April 15, 2011
- Preceded by: David L. Brewer III
- Succeeded by: John Deasy
- Acting; October 15, 2014 – January 11, 2016
- Preceded by: John Deasy
- Succeeded by: Michelle King

Personal details
- Born: Ramón Curtis Cortines; 1932 (age 93–94) San Antonio, Texas, United States

Ramón Curtis Cortines (Spanish pronunciation: [raˈmon koɾˈtines]; born 1932) is an American educator who has served as the chancellor of the New York City Department of Education, and the superintendent of the Los Angeles Unified School District in Los Angeles, California. Cortines returned as Los Angeles superintendent in October 2014, and his contract was extended in June 2015 for another year, through June 2016.

== Early life and career ==
Cortines was born in San Antonio, Texas. He briefly served as superintendent of schools in LA in 2000 and has headed a total of five school districts nationally. Cortines had also served in the U.S. Army from 1953 to 1955.

During the early 1960s Cortines served as Activity Director for Northview High School (in Covina) and later with South Hills (in West Covina) High School and soon moved up as the former superintendent of schools in the California cities of Pasadena, San Francisco, San Jose, along with being a former New York City Schools Chancellor. He was appointed to lead the New York City Schools in September 1993 by the former New York City Board of Education, serving during the last months of the administration of Mayor David Dinkins and during the first years of the administration of Mayor Rudy Giuliani. Cortines and Giuliani feuded for much of their shared tenure, with Giuliani being critical of Cortines' running of the schools. Cortines stepped down from the chancellorship in October 1995, going into the private sector.

Following his tenure in New York, Cortines served as a senior advisor to the U.S. Secretary of Education during the tenure of former education secretary Richard Riley. Before accepting the chancellorship, Cortines had been nominated to serve as Assistant Secretary of Education for Intergovernmental Affairs by President Bill Clinton, but he withdrew his nomination before his was confirmed by the U.S. Senate. Cortines served as LA's interim superintendent for several months in 2000, before former Colorado governor Roy Romer assumed the position.

=== Los Angeles Deputy Mayor ===
From 2006 to 2008, Cortines served as LA's Deputy Mayor for Education, Youth and Families in the Cabinet of Mayor Antonio Villaraigosa. As deputy mayor, Cortines oversaw education policy for the mayor, was his liaison to the school district, along with overseeing various agencies and policies impact children and families, including parks and recreation. Cortines left this position to become Senior Deputy Superintendent of Schools.

In 2012, a year after Cortines retired, the district announced a $200,000 settlement with a mid-level administrator, Scot Graham, who accused Cortines of sexual harassment. The deal later unraveled and Graham sued Cortines and the district. One suit was dismissed on technical grounds, and a second suit was withdrawn, according to L.A. Unified. After Cortines returned as superintendent in 2014, Scot Graham filed a new lawsuit with claims of sexual harassment against Cortines in February 2015.

=== Los Angeles Unified ===
During one of his stints at LAUSD, Superintendent Cortines had dual jobs as a board member from the Scholastic board, and as Superintendent of LAUSD. The Los Angeles Times reported that he was paid $150,000 while serving at the Scholastic board, in addition to $250,000 as Superintendent of LAUSD. Cortines defended his tenure at Scholastic, and claimed he avoided any issue which involved the educational publishing company. Cortines resigned from the Scholastic board on February 18, 2010.

==== Office of Inspector General ====
A notable controversy occurred six months after Cortines was named Superintendent of LAUSD, after he proposed to reduce funding for the Office of Inspector General (OIG) by 75%. During this time, LAUSD was operating under a significant budget shortfall. The Inspector General of OIG, Jerry Thornton, a retired FBI agent, came to a compromise with Cortines to reduce OIG's budget by 25% instead. Subsequently, Cortines and the LAUSD Board members refused to extend Thornton's contract. Thornton had previously produced audit and investigative reports that showed misuse of funds, lack of financial controls and many conflict-of-interest charges against senior district management. Notable reports include excessive consultant costs at the district's construction program, over $20 billion, largest in the country, as well as millions in excessive and unwarranted consultant charges against the Office of Environmental Health and Safety. Cortines eventually suspended and replaced many of the senior staff mentioned in Thornton's audits. Thorton left on June 30, 2010. Cortines selected, and the Board approved, Jess Womack, former deputy general counsel for the LAUSD construction program, as interim Inspector General. Interim Jess Womack continued OIG investigations of LAUSD senior management. A notable report was released four months after Jerry Thornton's departure, which found “irregularities in $65 million worth of consultant contracts.” This includes costs that exceeded pre-approved amounts by 50% and additional contracts worth $31 million without school board approval, specifically against James Sohn, Chief of Facilities, whom Cortines had hired to replace the prior chief, Guy Mehula. Cortines responded to this by canceling $3.7 million in consulting contracts cited in the report, but left open the possibility these consultants and contracts would return.

Cortines originally retired as superintendent of the Los Angeles Unified School District on April 16, 2011. In June, 2011 the school board announced that the downtown high school for the arts would be renamed Ramon C. Cortines School of Visual and Performing Arts.

==== Third tenure ====
In 2014, Cortines returned for a third time to lead LAUSD following the resignation of Superintendent John Deasy. On December 15, 2015, Cortines ordered all LAUSD schools to close for the day after receiving a bomb threat. The L.A. Board of Education met that day to discuss the school closures and to continue its discussions for a new schools' chief. In January 2016, Cortines was replaced by Michelle King.

== Career ==
Academic offices
Preceded by Carlos V. Cornejo (interim)	Superintendent, San Francisco Unified School District; 1986-1992	Succeeded by Waldemar "Bill" Rojas
Preceded by Harvey Garner (interim)	Schools Chancellor of New York City; 1993-1995	Succeeded by Rudy Crew
Preceded by Ruben Zacarias	Interim Superintendent of Schools of Los Angeles, California; 2000	Succeeded by Roy Romer
Preceded by New Position	Deputy Mayor of Los Angeles, California for Education, Youth and Families; 2006-2008	Succeeded by Miriam Long
Preceded by David L. Brewer III	Superintendent of Schools of Los Angeles, California; January 1, 2009-April 16, 2011	Succeeded by John Deasy
Preceded by John Deasy	Superintendent of Schools of Los Angeles, California; October 2014-June 2016	Succeeded by Michelle King
