= Vierling C. Kersey =

American educator

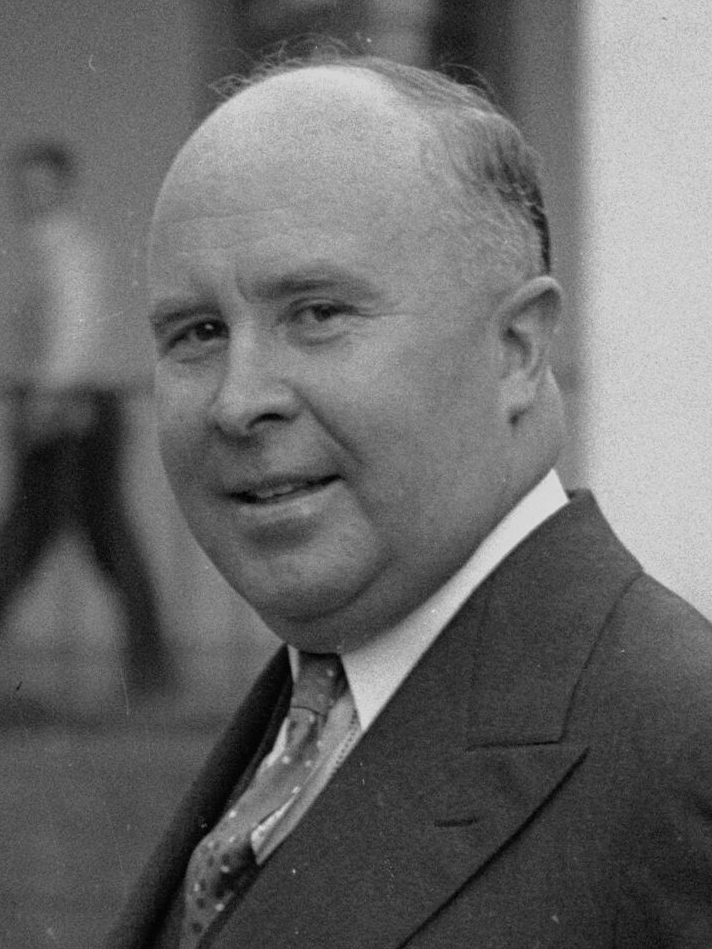
- Kersey in 1935

Superintendent of the Los Angeles Unified School District
- In office February 1, 1937 – August 1, 1948
- Preceded by: Frank A. Bouelle
- Succeeded by: Alexander J. Stoddard

California State Superintendent of Public Instruction
- In office February 11, 1929 – February 1, 1937
- Preceded by: William John Cooper
- Succeeded by: Walter F. Dexter

Personal details
- Born: January 28, 1890 Los Angeles, California
- Died: February 29, 1980 (aged 90) Los Angeles, California
- Spouse: Flora Myrtle Hommer (m. 1908)
- Children: 2
- Education: Los Angeles State Normal School (BA, MA)

Vierling C. Kersey Sr. (January 28, 1890 – February 29, 1980) was an American educator and politician who served as the California State Superintendent of Public Instruction and as the Superintendent of the Los Angeles Unified School District.

== Early life and education ==
Kersey was born on January 28, 1890, in Los Angeles to Richard Wakefield Kersey and Abbie L. Brewer. He attended Los Angeles State Normal School, earning a Bachelor of Arts degree in 1916 and a master's degree in 1921.

== Career ==
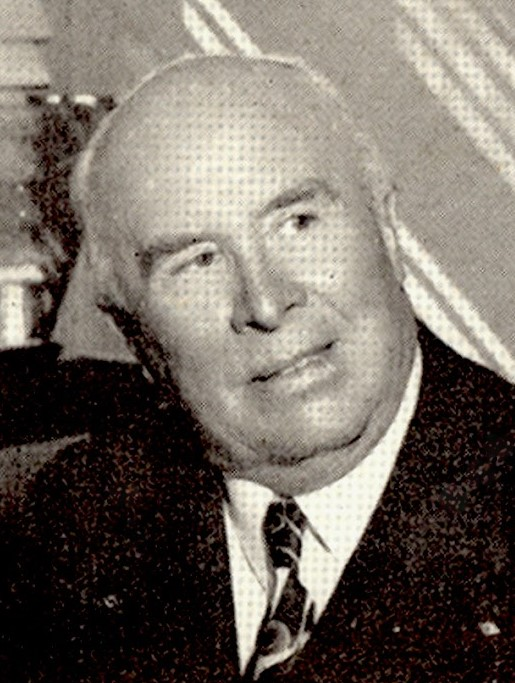
Kersey in 1950.

Prior to becoming State Superintendent, Kersey was a teacher and later principal of multiple schools. Kersey was appointed by governor C. C. Young to succeed William John Cooper as the California State Superintendent of Public Instruction. He took office on February 11, 1929, being elected to a full term in 1930 and re-elected in 1934. In 1936, Kersey was elected as Superintendent of the Los Angeles Unified School District after incumbent Frank A. Bouelle resigned due to ill health. In 1949, Keysey was selected to become the principal of Van Nuys High School and the director of the Los Angeles Valley College. In 1955, Kersey was elected as the first vice president of the San Fernando Valley Youth Foundation.

== Personal life ==
Kersey married Flora Myrtle Hommer on November 21, 1908, in Santa Ana, California, with the two having two children, Vierling Kersey Jr. and Myrtle Evelyn Kersey. He died on February 29, 1980, in Los Angeles.

Kersey's son, Vierling Jr., subsequently donated Kersey's California History book collection to the Santa Clarita Valley (Calif.) Historical Society, which makes it available by appointment.
