= Susan Miller Dorsey =

American educator and school superintendent

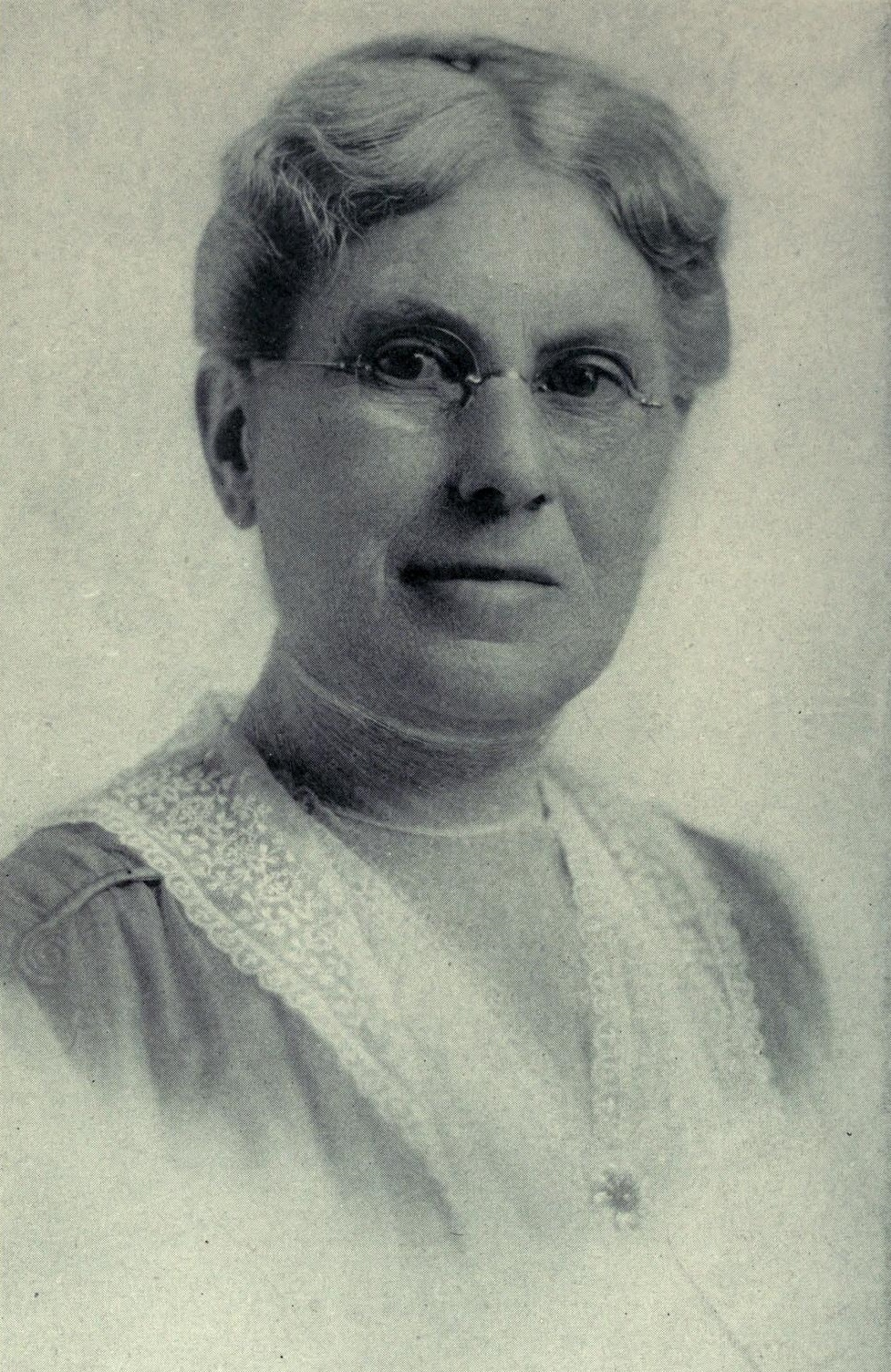
- Born: Susan Almira Miller; February 16, 1857; Penn Yan, New York, U.S.
- Died: February 5, 1946 (age 88); Los Angeles, California, U.S.
- Occupations: Educator, superintendent of schools

Susan Miller Dorsey (February 16, 1857 – February 5, 1946) was an American educator who served as the superintendent of the Los Angeles City Schools from 1920 to 1929.

== Early life and education ==
Susan Almira Miller was born in Penn Yan, New York, the daughter of James Miller and Hannah Benedict Miller. She graduated from Vassar College in 1877, and was a member of Phi Beta Kappa there.

== Career ==
Dorsey taught at Wilson College and at Vassar before marrying and moving to California with her husband in the 1880s. She taught classics at Los Angeles High School, beginning in 1896. By 1902, she was working as a school administrator. She was named an assistant superintendent in 1913, and in 1920, Dorsey became the first female superintendent of Los Angeles City Schools. She would serve in that capacity until her retirement in 1929.

Dorsey was a member of the board of trustees at Scripps College. In 1937 she spoke to the prohibitionist Women's Law Observance Association and denounced realist literature that dealt with or included "the seamy things of life". In 1937, Susan Miller Dorsey High School in the Baldwin Hills neighborhood of Los Angeles was dedicated in her honor. It was an adult high school in the 1950s.

== Personal life and legacy ==
Susan Miller married the Rev. Patrick William Dorsey, and moved to California with him when he became minister of a Baptist church in Los Angeles. They had a son, Paul Dorsey. Her husband took their son and left her, and Los Angeles, in 1895; both professional and personal misconduct were rumored to be involved, and the Dorseys were eventually divorced. She died in 1946, at the age of 88, in Los Angeles.

Dorsey Hall, a dormitory at Scripps College, is named for her. A 1928 oil portrait of Dorsey by John Hubbard Rich, which was de-accessioned by the Los Angeles County Museum of Art in the 1980s, was recovered in 2007 by Dorsey High School alumna and former teacher Janet Horwitz Colman.

== Notes and references ==
Preceded by Dr. Albert Shiels	Superintendent of the Los Angeles Unified School District; 1920–1929	Succeeded by Frank A. Bouelle
