= James Sohn =

American school facilities manager

James D. Sohn formerly served as the Chief of Facilities of the Los Angeles Unified School District Facilities Division (LAUSD), having been appointed by the Superintendent Ramon C. Cortines. LAUSD is the 2nd largest school district in the United States. The Facilities Services Division oversees all maintenance and operations, including the construction and modernization program. The bond program is the largest school construction program in the United States, with more than five voter approved bond measures totaling $20.6 billion coupled with billions in matching funds from the State of California.

== Education ==
James Sohn holds a Bachelor of Arts degree from the University of California, Berkeley; a Master of Business Administration from University of Phoenix, and a Master of Arts from King's College London. He is a LEED accredited professional, licensed general contractor in the state of California and a member of the London-based think tank, International Institute of Strategic Studies.

== Tenure at Los Angeles Unified School District ==
James Sohn initially worked as a consultant at LAUSD prior to becoming a Senior Project Manager for Robert F. Kennedy Community Learning Center. This is considered the largest, most expensive school ever built in the United States, at a cost of over $578 million. The school is located on the site where Senator Robert F. Kennedy was shot and killed in 1968. It can hold 4,200 students and includes a manicured public park, swimming pool and fine art murals.

He returned to LAUSD in July 2009 as a Deputy Chief of Facilities, eventually replacing the previous Chief of Facilities, Guy Mehula. Mehula was criticized for the use of expensive consultants.

On January 25, 2011, the Facilities Services Division under James Sohn released $531 million in additional funds due to savings from decreased construction costs as a result of the downward economy and from reserve funds that were previously unavailable. Some questions were raised as to the priorities of the projects funded but many long-identified but unfunded projects were ultimately approved via the board action on January 25, 2010. Union officials continue to protest as to why bond district employees were laid off when additional funding is currently available.

One of James Sohn's priorities was the use of renewable energy. On February 10, 2011, LAUSD officials gathered at Canoga Park High School to celebrate the activation of a 273-kilowatt (kW), 896-solar-panel system on the school's rooftops. Sohn's goal is to achieve 21 megawatts of power in the next three years installing solar panels in various schools. Projections show that this will save approximately $112 million in utility costs over 20 years.

At the helm of the school construction program at LAUSD, Sohn introduced numerous efforts at reforming the school construction program by consolidating numerous departments, laying off hundreds of consultants and district employees and slashing consultant rates by 20%. However, a limited review audit by LAUSD's Office of the Inspector General (OIG) found issues with some of these reforms. This includes costs that exceed pre-approved amounts by 50% and additional contracts worth $31 million without school board approval. These contracts were amended to correct the issues the OIG identified. The OIG found that in some cases the 20% reduction in rates was later amended for a subset of consultants back to their original rates. The report also found that the consultant rate multipliers were changed from 1.8 to 1.98 during negotiations. The OIG report also showed a $40,000 initiation fee for one of the consultant contracts. Following this report, Superintendent Cortines canceled $3.7 million in contracts cited in the OIG report, including the contract that included the initiation fee but left open the possibility the consultants may return.

An audit by the Los Angeles City Controller, Wendy Greuel, showed that prior to 2006 there was a lack of controls and that a potential existed for conflict of interests to occur regarding consultant use at the LAUSD Facilities bond program, but noted that: "from 2006 to the present day the district has undergone a dramatic improvement and has done a good job ensuring the integrity of the selection process." The City Controller has been criticized for not releasing the names of the individuals cited in the audit.

James Sohn introduced a new contract type, called Agency Construction Manager (Agency CM), which offers many benefits, including maximizing consultant services, lower costs, increased productivity and increase small business competition (see Construction Management). Agency CM is an attempt to replace the old consultant model of billing for an hourly rate in favor of a lump sum task order. Task orders (Job Order Contracting) are designed to provide payment for completion of a particular task, regardless of the number of hours worked. Criticisms with this include the lack of adequate tracking of consultant employees, difficulty in comparing district to consultant staff, and contracts which were cited in the OIG report as vague in detail.

During his tenure at LAUSD, the district halted a cleanup effort of draft and outdated electronic versions of documents. After Teamsters union complaints, LAUSD halted this practice.

During Sohn's tenure at LAUSD, there were ongoing issues with budgets and layoffs, brought on by California's continuing budget situation. Teamsters officials have complained about layoffs within facilities of their members. Teamsters Representative Connie Oser stated that district staff have been removed while consultant contracts continued to be approved by the Board, consultant employees moved between companies, and that the use of Agency CM causes the tracking of consultants to be difficult. Superintendent Ramon Cortines and Chief of Facilities James Sohn have both stated that consultants have been reduced in far greater numbers than district staff. A protest by Teamsters was held on February 9, 2010, in reference to Board of Education Report - 253 - 09/10, which include 40 consultant contracts which were approved by the Board, totaling $65 million worth of bond funds. Teamsters complained district employees, many of whom perform similar or same work responsibilities, were being laid off rather than consultants. Teamsters claim this is in violation of California Education code 45308, which state "classified employees shall be subject to layoff for lack of work or lack of funds." During the Board meeting to discuss BOE-253 - 09/10, Superintendent Cortines pushed for the approval of the consultant contracts, against the wishes of Board member Yolie Flores, who wanted more time to discuss. Board members who approved BOE-253 - 09/10 were Monica Garcia, Richard Vladovic, Tamar Galatzan and Nury Martinez. Board member who voted no were Steve Zimmer. Board member Yolie Flores abstained and Marguerite LaMotte was absent. A former LAUSD Construction Department employee, Bassam Raslan, employed before James Sohn's tenure as Chief, but who remained until 2010, was arrested and indicted by a grand jury for conflict of interest charges. Bassam pleaded guilty to one count of conflict of interest.

=== Construction safety ===
James Sohn would work to increase the speed of DSA approved projects. On September 14, 2010, the Board of Education approved a Memorandum of Understanding (MOU) with the Division of State Architect (DSA) that would provide up to 8 million dollars to fund a DSA Certification pilot program that sought to relieve the backlog of DSA Certification files backlog that has developed over the last 12 years of construction.

Even with this pilot program approved, construction delay, quality and safety would continue to plague LAUSD. A few months after the MOU, The Division of State Architect warned the district that cutbacks made to Inspector positions at LAUSD construction sites could affect "safety and quality" of schools and the district would be held liable. The district had laid off 37 out of 112 state-certificated inspectors in December 2010. The layoffs were based on projections that would later be deemed incorrect.

=== Resignation ===
James Sohn resigned from LAUSD on March 15, 2011.

== Tenure at Los Angeles Community College District ==
James Sohn served as the head of the Program Management team for the Los Angeles Community College bond program from July, 2007 to June, 2009. With more than $6 billion to modernize its nine colleges, the Los Angeles Community Colleges (LACCD) Sustainable Building Program is one of the nation's largest green construction efforts, with 87 buildings expected to meet LEED™ (Leadership in Energy and Environmental Design) standards. The District has received numerous awards for its environmentally responsible construction projects. Most of the program's funding comes from bond measures that were approved by voters in 2001, 2003 and 2008.

After James Sohn's tenure at LACCD, an audit by Capstone Advisory Group LLC, showed bond funds being used on items that Capstone did not deem appropriate uses of bond funds. It called for a whistle-blower protection program and new stringent financial controls. The recommendations were released after he had left LACCD for LAUSD, but referenced the years during James Sohn's tenure as the head of the Program Management team for the LACCD bond construction program(2007–2009), as well as prior and subsequent years.

A special Los Angeles Times report on the Los Angeles Community College bond program documenting waste, building quality, delays, cost overruns, nepotism and other issues was released on February 27, 2011. These issues included complaints from faculty regarding quality issues affecting some of the completed buildings, buildings which were completed later than their original schedule, concerns whether or not the green energy initiatives would recoup their investment, consultant billing rates, lack of external citizen oversight, lack of an OIG, and construction contracts which were cancelled after work began due to budget shortfalls. The Valley Health and Science Center, mentioned in the series, would win the Western Council of Construction Consumers 2009 Distinguished Project Award.
