= David L. Brewer III =

United States admiral

David L. Brewer, III
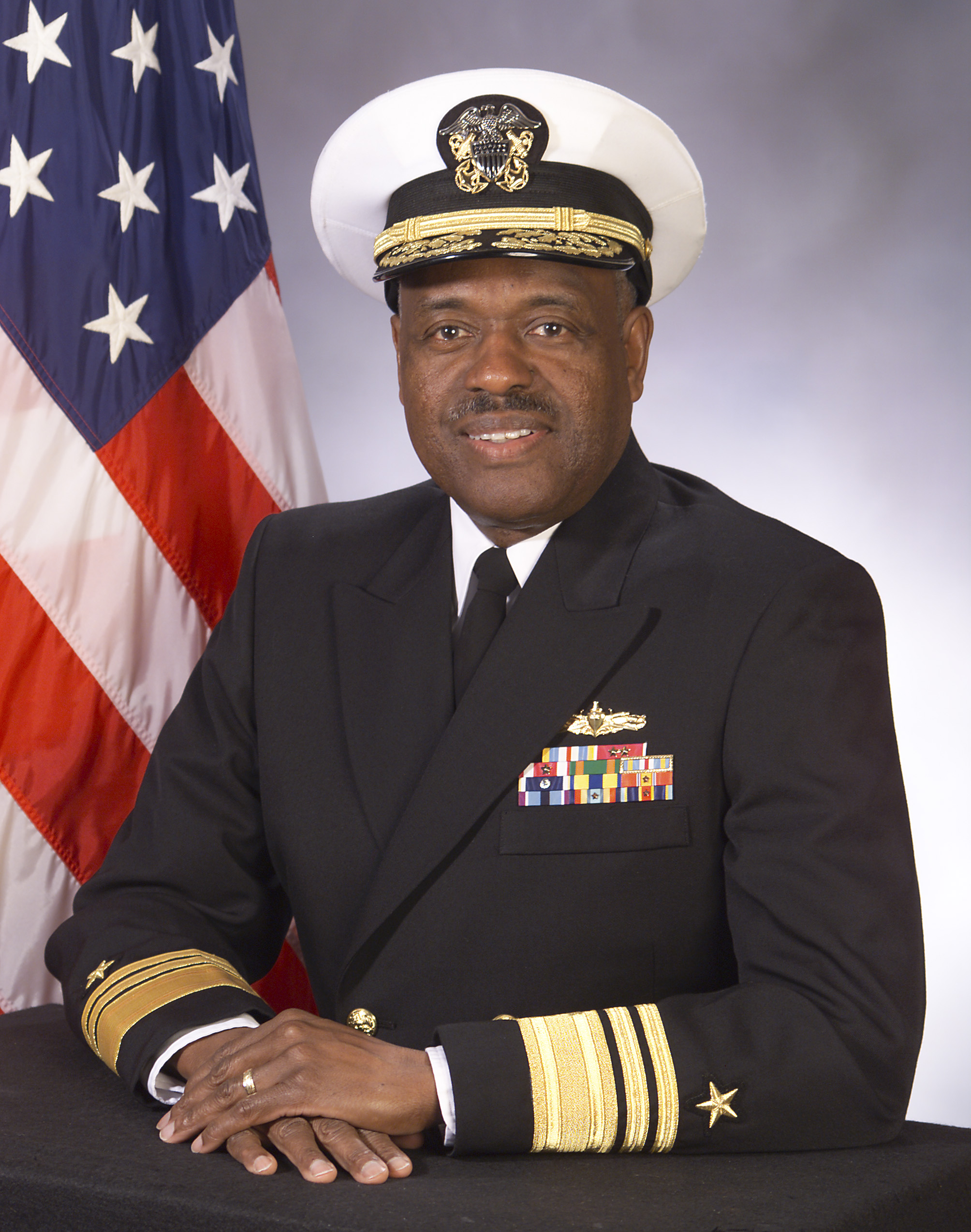
- Official Navy portrait of Vice Admiral David L. Brewer, III Commander, Military Sealift Command
- Born: David Lawren Brewer III; May 19, 1946 (age 80); Farmville, Virginia
- Military career
- Allegiance: United States of America
- Branch: United States Navy
- Rank: Vice Admiral
- Commands: Amphibious Group 3 Military Sealift Command
- Awards: Navy Distinguished Service Medal; Defense Superior Service Medal; Legion of Merit (3); Meritorious Service Medal (2); Navy Achievement Medal
- Other work: Superintendent, Los Angeles Unified School District

David L. Brewer (born May 19, 1946) is a retired vice admiral of the United States Navy and former superintendent of the Los Angeles Unified School District. The 35-year veteran of the Navy was the captain of USS Mount Whitney from April 3, 1991 – December 5, 1992, commanded Military Sealift Command from August 2001 until his retirement in March 2006, and served as Vice Chief of Naval Education and Training from 1999 to 2001. As Vice Chief of Naval Education and Training, he is known for helping to develop the Navy College Program and negotiating contracts with 11 colleges, universities and community colleges to provide bachelor and associate degree programs to more than 300,000 sailors. As Commander of Military Sealift Command, he is known for overseeing the massive Military Sealift Command (MSC) partnership with the private sector shipping contractors operation in support of Operation Iraqi Freedom which involved moving over 20,000,000 square feet (1,900,000 m^{2}) of equipment to the Persian Gulf in less than four months. He is also known for leading the Military Sealift Command's disaster relief efforts after Hurricane Katrina.

His flag command posts included Commander Naval Forces Marianas, which had the concurrent posts of Commander in Chief U.S. Pacific Command Representative Guam/Commonwealth of the Northern Marianas Islands/Federated States of Micronesia/Republic of Palau. In January 1997, Vice Adm. Brewer took command of Amphibious Group 3 in San Diego, California. In July 1997, he was nominated for promotion to the rank of Rear Adm. (Upper Half). He later became Vice Chief of Naval Education and Training in Pensacola, Florida, and Commander, Military Sealift Command headquartered in Washington, D.C.

== Early life ==
David was born to David L. Brewer, Jr., and Mildred S. Brewer in Farmville, Prince Edward County, Virginia. His naval career began in 1970 when he was commissioned an ensign in the U.S. Navy by former Secretary of the Navy, Senator John Chafee. He was a member of the first graduating class of the first Naval Reserve Officer Training Corps unit at an historically black university, Prairie View A&M University, Prairie View, Texas.

At age five, Brewer moved with his family from Farmville, Virginia to Florida, and he attended elementary and secondary schools in Orlando, Florida. Later, he earned a Bachelor of Science in biology at Prairie View A&M University where he also was a member of the Naval Reserve Officer Training Corps (NROTC). He later earned a Masters of Arts in National Security and Strategic Studies at the Naval War College in Newport, Rhode Island.

== Post-navy career ==
In October 2006, Brewer was unanimously selected by the Los Angeles Board of Education as the superintendent of the Los Angeles Unified School District, (LAUSD). Brewer succeeded former Colorado Governor Roy Romer as the superintendent. LAUSD is the second largest school district in the U.S., with over 700,000 students, 800 schools, 77,000 employees, and a $7.5 billion budget. He was awarded a four-year contract that took effect November 13, 2006.

Brewer served as superintendent until December 2008 when his contract was bought out by the district prior to the end of his four-year term. According to figures reported on August 4, 2009, the dropout rate in the Los Angeles Unified School District declined almost 17% under Brewer's leadership. Specifically the dropout rate for the 2007–08 school year came in at 26.4%, down from 31.7% for the previous year and among the largest improvements in the state of California. The Los Angeles Unified School District still trails all other large urban school systems in California except the Oakland Unified School District.

These results highlight the achievements of Brewer, who was forced out in December 2008 despite rising test scores. Brewer, reached by the Los Angeles Times, credited Debra Duardo, a onetime dropout who began the district's dropout-prevention unit, as well as district principals and teachers who accepted responsibility for taking on the dropout problem.

Brewer heads The David and Mildred Brewer Foundation, a family foundation that provides scholarships for African American students. It is named in honor of his mother, a retired school teacher, and his late father, who taught at Brewer's high school for more than 33 years. Brewer currently serves as a Benchmark Practitioner with Benchmarking Partners in Cambridge, Massachusetts.

== Personal life ==
He is married to Richardene "Deanie" Brewer, Ed.D. Dr. Brewer is a graduate of Hampton University where she majored in English education. She also has a Master of Arts degree in curriculum and instruction from San Diego State University. Deanie received her Ed.D. in educational leadership from the University of West Florida in Pensacola, Florida. Dr. Brewer's teaching career has spanned more than 20 years and has taken her from Virginia to San Diego and from England to Guam. She has taught at the middle school, high school and collegiate levels, earning several teacher excellence and academic awards.

Their daughter, Stacey, graduated from Hampton University in 2002 as a distinguished scholar. She went on to receive her Juris Doctor degree from Pennsylvania State's Dickinson School of Law in 2005. She currently resides in Centreville, Virginia.

== Decorations ==
His decorations and awards include the Navy Distinguished Service Medal, Defense Superior Service Medal, Legions of Merit (three), Meritorious Service Medal, Navy and Marine Corps Achievement Medal, Naval War College Distinguished Graduate Leadership Award, Navy League of the United States Vincent T. Hirsch Maritime Award, and the National Defense Transportation Association's Department of Defense Distinguished Service Award.

- Navy Distinguished Service Medal
- Defense Superior Service Medal
- Legion of Merit with two Gold Stars
- Meritorious Service Medal
- Navy and Marine Corps Achievement Medal
- Joint Meritorious Unit Award
- Navy E Ribbon
- Navy Expeditionary Medal
- National Defense Service Medal
- Humanitarian Service Medal
- Navy and Marine Corps Sea Service Deployment Ribbon
- Navy and Marine Corps Overseas Service Ribbon

Political offices
Preceded by Roy Romer	Superintendent of the Los Angeles Unified School District; 2006–2009	Succeeded by Ramon C. Cortines
