= John E. Deasy =

American politician

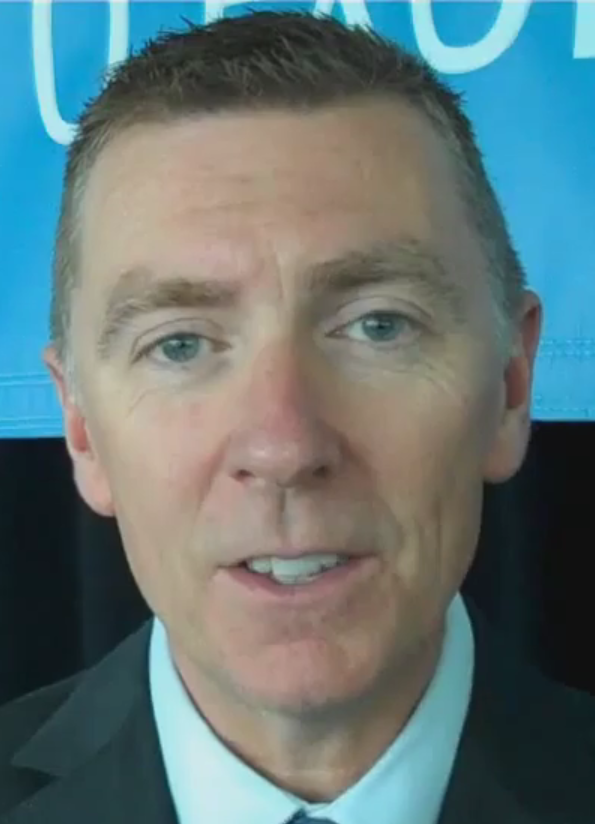
- Deasy in 2011
- Born: John Edward Deasy; December 16, 1960 (age 65); East Providence, Rhode Island, US
- Education: Providence College (BA, MA); University of Louisville (PhD)
- Spouse: Patricia Nassaney Deasy
- Children: 3

Superintendent of Stockton Unified School District
- In office June 1, 2018 – June 15, 2020

Superintendent of the Los Angeles Unified School District
- In office April 15, 2011 – October 15, 2014
- Preceded by: Michelle King
- Succeeded by: Ramón C. Cortines

Superintendent of Prince George's County Public Schools
- In office May 1, 2006 – September 30, 2008
- Preceded by: William Hite
- Succeeded by: Andre J. Hornsby

Superintendent of Santa Monica–Malibu Unified School District
- In office July 5, 2001 – February 22, 2006
- Preceded by: Dianne Talarico
- Succeeded by: Neil Schmidt

Superintendent of Coventry Public Schools
- In office 1996 – July 5, 2001
- Preceded by: Donna Bernard
- Succeeded by: Raymond Spear

John Edward Deasy (/ˈdeɪsiː/; born December 16, 1960) is an American businessman who served as a superintendent for multiple school districts from 1996 until 2020. He first served as superintendent for Coventry Public Schools, the Santa Monica–Malibu Unified School District, and Prince George's County Public Schools. Deasy became the Superintendent of the Los Angeles Unified School District on April 15, 2011, succeeding Ramon Cortines. He served until his resignation on October 15, 2014, at which point Cortines was appointed as his successor. He later served as the superintendent of Stockton Unified School District from 2018 until 2020.

During his tenure at LAUSD, test scores and graduation rates increased, but his push for more teacher accountability created tension with United Teachers Los Angeles. Deasy's initiative to provide iPads to every student in the district received praise for its ambition but also faced criticism for his oversight of the program and his leadership style. In 2014, the iPad program became embroiled in a scandal due to revelations of Deasy's ties to Apple Inc., leading to its cancellation and the Federal Bureau of Investigation seizing records related to the program. Deasy resigned a month before his term was to be renewed by the district.

== Early life and education ==
Deasy was born into a Roman Catholic family on December 16, 1960, in East Providence, Rhode Island. His father was Richard M. Deasy, a professor at Providence College and Rosalind J. (Gibbs) Deasy, a teacher. He attended Providence College, where he earned a bachelor's degree in 1983 and a master's degree in 1987. He later obtained a doctorate in education from the University of Louisville in 2004.

== Early teaching and superintendent career ==
He became involved in the field of education, teaching subjects like chemistry, biology, and physics at Lake George Junior/Senior High School. Eventually, he took on administrative roles, serving as the school's assistant principal before being promoted to principal in 1989. In 1996, he became the Superintendent of Coventry Public Schools, where he was in office until 2001.

That year, Deasy was selected to head the Santa Monica–Malibu Unified School District, replacing Neil Schmidt, who retired in the summer. He was selected from a pool of sixty applicants and moved to California with his eldest daughter. His wife, Patricia, and their two younger children joined them in California later in January 2002. During his tenure, the district's performance ranked higher than the Los Angeles County average for the 2004–2005 school year. As Superintendent of the Santa Monica–Malibu Unified School District, he was known for his initiatives in narrowing educational disparities and successfully mobilizing community support, including passing significant tax increases to fund schools. However, his push for a controversial equity fund to redistribute private donations among schools sparked some backlash.

During this time, Deasy awarded a $375,000 consulting contract to the National Center on Public Education and Social Policy, which was headed by Robert Felner. Felner, who was also Deasy's doctoral advisor at the University of Louisville, had granted Deasy a waiver that allowed him to complete his doctorate after only one semester at Louisville.

In March 2006, Deasy was chosen to become the Superintendent of Prince George's County Public Schools after the school board voted to hire him. He was chosen over administrators from Kansas and New York, with board members citing Deasy as a "passionate educator with a record of raising minority performance." He resigned as superintendent on February 22, 2006. Deasy started as superintendent at Prince George's County Public Schools on May 1, 2006.

During this time, controversy arose due to discrepancies in his records, which indicated that Deasy received his doctorate from the University of Louisville with only nine credit hours. In response to these concerns, the university formed a six-member blue-ribbon committee to investigate the discrepancies surrounding Deasy's degree. Despite the scrutiny, university president James R. Ramsey stated that the committee found no violations related to Deasy's doctoral degree.

After two years, Deasy announced his resignation to accept a job offer from the Bill & Melinda Gates Foundation. He served as the deputy director of Education at the Bill & Melinda Gates Foundation for three years before being hired by the Los Angeles Unified School District as a deputy superintendent.

== Los Angeles Unified School District ==
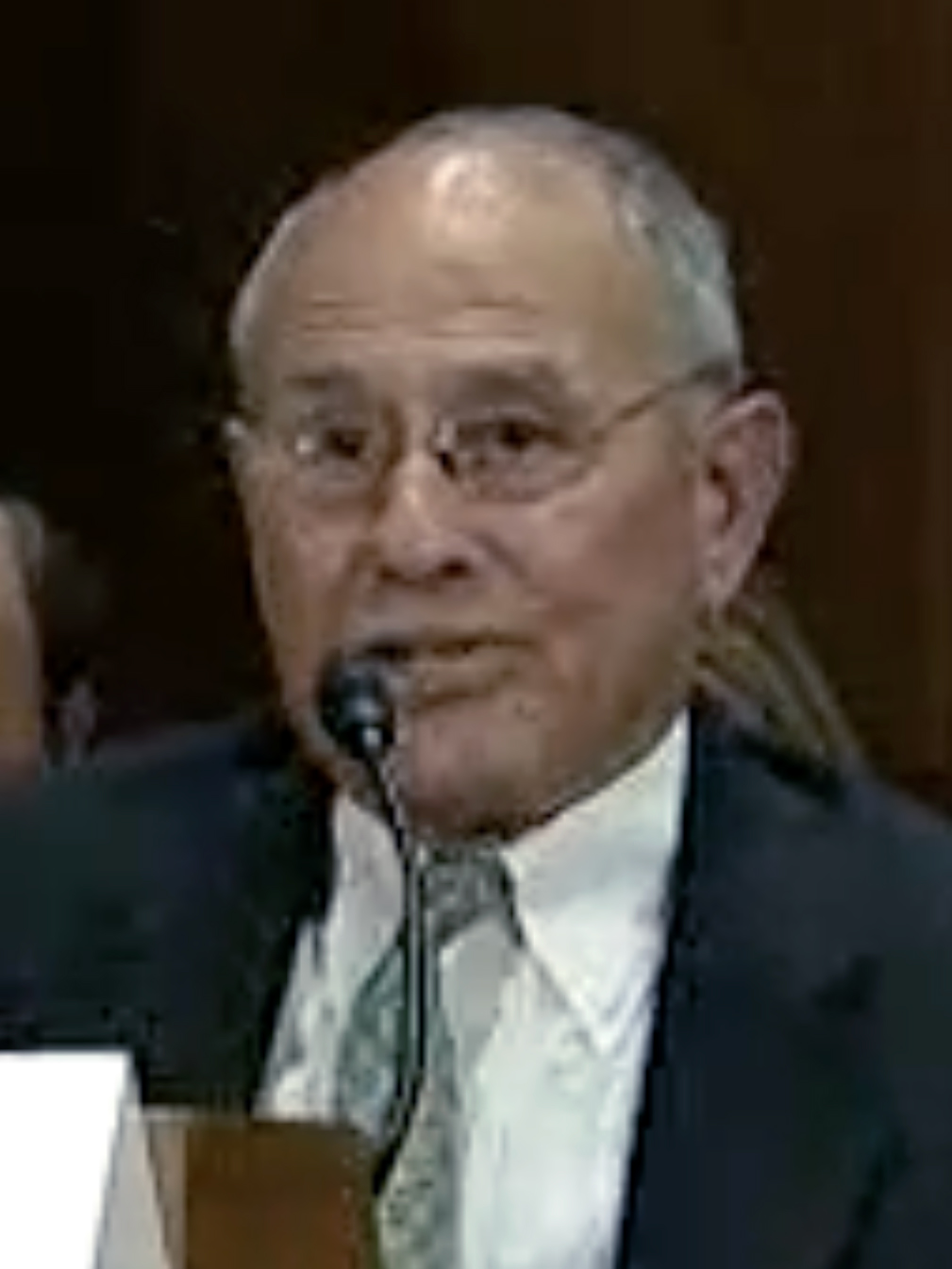
Deasy replaced Ramón C. Cortines after he stepped down. Cortines would serve again as interim after Deasy's resignation.

Deasy started serving as deputy superintendent of LAUSD in August 2010. By October 2010, it was reported that Deasy was being considered for the position of Superintendent of the Los Angeles Unified School District after Ramón C. Cortines announced he would step down. On January 11, 2011, the LAUSD school board voted 6–0 to name Deasy as superintendent, with only Board member Steve Zimmer abstaining. During his tenure, the district saw improved test scores and graduation rates and lower suspension rates, but was criticized for uncompromising positions on teacher evaluation and employment.

On February 12, 2013, the Board of Education approved Deasy's proposal to provide every student and teacher with a tablet computer by 2014. The district awarded Apple Inc. a $30 million contract to supply iPads for classrooms. However, the pilot phase encountered several issues, with some schools opting out and others experiencing Wi-Fi network problems. Deputy Superintendent of Instruction Jaime Aquino, who was in charge of the plan, resigned on September 13, 2013, citing the board's recent efforts to stall key reform initiatives. Deputy Superintendent of Instruction Jaime Aquino, who was in charge of the plan, resigned on September 13, 2013, citing the board's recent efforts to stall key reform initiatives.

By October 2013, Deasy had informed some members of the Board of Education that he had plans to resign, despite expectations that his contract would be renewed in November despite ongoing controversies. He resigned from office on October 15, 2014. United States Secretary of Education Arne Duncan expressed disappointment in his resignation, praising Deasy for his accomplishments during his tenure. After Deasy's resignation, there was speculation about who would replace him as an official superintendent, but it was decided that, after Cortines, deputy superintendent Michelle King would become superintendent. In December 2014, the Federal Bureau of Investigation seized records from LAUSD pertaining to the iPad program.

== Consulting and Stockton Unified ==
In 2015, Deasy was hired as a consultant at the Broad Center, an organization funded by Eli Broad. He also served as a superintendent-in-residence for the Broad Academy, a position he held until 2018. On April 6, 2018, the Clark County School District announced the top four candidates for superintendent, which included Deasy. His pick was controversial due to his resignation with LAUSD, and on April 12, Deasy announced that he would withdraw from the election. The announcement came after the School Board of Trustees said that they would extend the search timeline and look for internal candidates.

In May 2018, Deasy was hired as superintendent of Stockton Unified School District. Durning his tenure, questions arose regarding Deasy's doctorate from the University of Louisville, as well as his past from the LAUSD iPad scandal. On June 15, 2020, Deasy resigned from his position, and the resignation was accepted by the board in a special meeting held via teleconference due to the COVID-19 pandemic. Assemblywoman Susan Eggman expressed her frustration over his resignation, stating that "there was no serious reason to get rid of the SUSD superintendent." Stockton Mayor Michael Tubbs criticized the board's decision, saying that it would cost the district to find a replacement and that the four board members who voted in favor of the resignation should be held accountable for their decision. On July 5, 2023, the Bezos Family Foundation announced that Deasy had been named the new president of the foundation.

== Personal life ==
Deasy married Patricia Nassaney, a nurse practitioner; they have three children. He received the Service to Education Award by Providence College at their 2013 reunion. He has described himself as a liberal, supporting Vermont Governor Howard Dean's campaign in the 2004 Democratic Party presidential primaries.
