= Walter F. Dexter =

American academic and politician

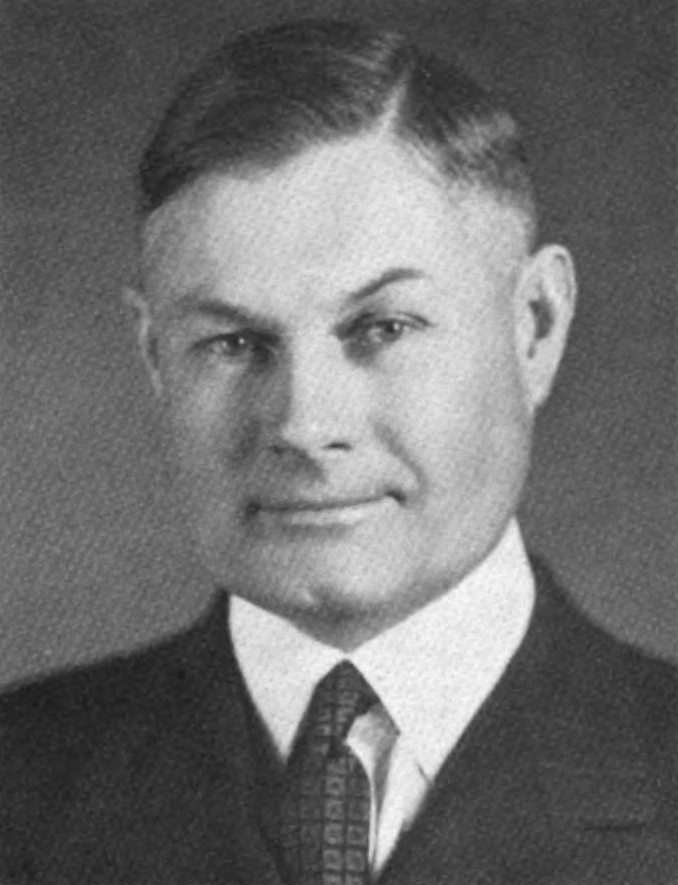
Dexter c. 1942

Walter Friar Dexter (November 21, 1886 – October 21, 1945) was an American educator and politician. He was born November 21, 1886, in Chicago. He served as president of Whittier College from 1923 to 1934. He was the author of Herbert Hoover's 1932 campaign biography. After a stint as secretary to Governor Frank Merriam, he became California State Superintendent of Public Instruction, a position he held until his death. He also was the President of Lions Club International from 1938 to 1939.

He was awarded an honorary Doctor of Laws (LL.D.) degree from Whittier College in 1934.

A middle school in Whittier, California is named for him, as were the Student Center at Whittier College and Cal Poly's first library.

In Spring of 1945, Dexter was asked to run for Congress in the 1946 midterms but died before those elections took place. Depending on source he may have recommended former Whittier student Richard Nixon to run for the seat, or Nixon may have been a second choice without his recommendation.

Political offices
Preceded by Vierling C. Kersey	California State Superintendent of Public Instruction; February 1, 1937 – October 21, 1945	Succeeded by Roy E. Simpson
Academic offices
Preceded by Harry N. Wright	President of Whittier College; 1923–1934	Succeeded by William O. Mendenhall
