= Austin Beutner =

American businessman (born 1960)

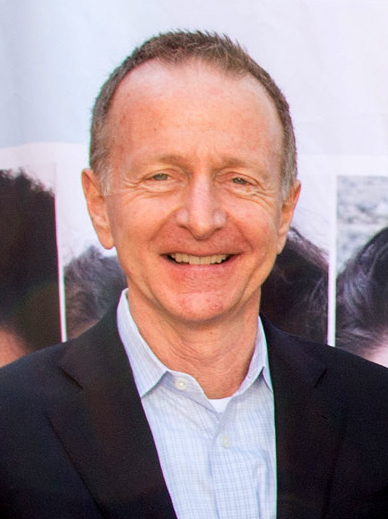
- Beutner in 2020

Superintendent of the Los Angeles Unified School District
- In office May 1, 2018 – June 30, 2021
- Preceded by: Vivian Ekchian (acting)
- Succeeded by: Megan Reilly (acting)

1st Deputy Mayor of Los Angeles
- In office January 11, 2010 – July 1, 2013
- Mayor: Antonio Villaraigosa
- Preceded by: Position established
- Succeeded by: Position abolished

Personal details
- Born: Austin Michael Beutner; April 8, 1960 (age 66) New York, U.S.
- Spouse: Virginia Woltz
- Children: 4
- Education: Dartmouth College (BA)

Austin Michael Beutner (born April 8, 1960) is an American businessman who served as Los Angeles Unified School District Superintendent from May 1, 2018 to June 30, 2021. He previously served as the first deputy mayor of Los Angeles from January 11, 2010 through July 1, 2013, and briefly ran in the 2013 Los Angeles mayoral election. Prior to entering politics, Beutner was an investment banker and would later become the publisher and CEO of the Los Angeles Times and The San Diego Union-Tribune. Beutner ran in the 2026 Los Angeles mayoral election, but withdrew after a family death.

== Philanthropy ==
In 1994 Beutner founded The Beutner Family Foundation with a focus on philanthropy and education for economically disadvantaged people.

In 2012 Beutner founded Vision to Learn, a non-profit that provides children with free eye exams and free glasses by bringing its mobile eye clinics to schools and to other neighborhood youth and community organizations.

On November 8, 2022, California voters approved Proposition 28: The Arts and Music in Schools Funding Guarantee and Accountability Act. The measure requires the state to establish a new, ongoing program supporting arts instruction in schools beginning in 2023–24. Beutner authored the bill and spent nearly $4.2 million of his own money to support the bill. Californians overwhelmingly passed the Proposition.

Beutner established the Beutner Family Award for Excellence in the Arts, providing scholarships to support 20 students at the California Institute of the Arts in Los Angeles County.

== Biography ==
=== Early life and education ===
Beutner was born in New York and raised in Grand Rapids, Michigan, the son of German immigrants who came to the United States in the 1920s for economic opportunity. His mother was a schoolteacher and his father was a manufacturing engineer. His mother was Jewish and his father was Catholic, although he did not find out that his father's family was Christian until he was an adult. He is a graduate of East Grand Rapids High School, and graduated from Dartmouth College with a Bachelor of Arts in economics.

=== Finance ===
After graduating in 1982 he went to work at Smith Barney as a financial analyst. At the age of 29, he became partner at The Blackstone Group.

In 1996 Beutner co-founded Evercore Partners, an American independent investment banking advisory firm, with former Deputy Secretary of the Treasury Roger Altman. When Evercore went public (NYES-EVR) in 2006, the IPO reportedly made Beutner more than $100 million.

=== Government ===
After the fall of the Soviet Union, Beutner went to work for the U.S. State Department on Russia issues.

In January 2010, Beutner was appointed by Antonio Villaraigosa to be the first deputy mayor of Los Angeles, with oversight of twelve city agencies, including the Port of Los Angeles, Department of Water and Power and the Housing Authority, with over 17,000 employees. In 2013, with Villaraigosa's term ending, Beutner launched a campaign to run for Mayor of Los Angeles, but dropped from the race after a year having captured only 2% of likely voters. The election was a year away when Beutner suspended his efforts.

In 2013, Beutner and former U.S. Secretary of Commerce Mickey Kantor co-chaired the 2020 Commission to study and report on the financial matters in Los Angeles. One of the report's recommendations was to reform the Los Angeles Department of Water and Power (DWP). In 2016 Beutner and Kantor penned an op-ed in the Los Angeles Times aimed at bringing about reform and changes to the DWP, noting that "The city deserves a public utility that is operated in the long-term best interests of its customers, employees and our environment."

=== Los Angeles Unified School District ===
In July 2017, Beutner created a task force for the Los Angeles Unified School District to look for solutions for declining attendance and other problems. Beutner co-chairs the task force with SEIU President Laphonza Butler. "We are here to support Michelle King, and offer suggestions," Beutner said in an interview with LA School Report.

On May 1, 2018, the Board appointed Austin Beutner and was met with criticism by United Teachers Los Angeles, who said that Beutner did not have any experience managing a school or a school district. In 2019, UTLA authorized a strike against LAUSD that lasted six days. About 30,000 teachers strike and only a third of about 500,000 students showed up to school, with the District losing $15 million on the first day. The strike ended after a deal between LAUSD and UTLA was reached.

In 2020, the COVID-19 pandemic had forced the schools to shut down. In 2021, Beutner announced that he would step down on June 30.

In 2025, Beutner filed a lawsuit against LAUSD for allegedly misusing millions of dollars meant to be used for arts education.

=== Newspaper ownership ===
In March 2013, a group led by Beutner and Eli Broad announced their intent to purchase the Los Angeles Times from its parent Tribune Publishing. They were unsuccessful.

In 2014, Beutner took over as publisher and CEO of the Los Angeles Times when Eddy Hartenstein left to become the non-executive chairman of the board of Tribune Publishing. When Tribune Publishing acquired the San Diego Union-Tribune in 2015, Beutner was named its CEO and publisher, as well as CEO of the newly formed California News Group.

He was fired as publisher and chief executive officer of the Los Angeles Times on September 8, 2015. He wrote on Facebook that the dismissal was not voluntary: "I am not departing by choice, nor is this some 'mutual agreement' on my part and Tribune Publishing". Beutner's firing was protested by a number of prominent community leaders.

=== Vision to Learn ===
Beutner founded the nonprofit organization Vision to Learn in 2012 in order to provide free optometry services to children in low-income communities.” In 2022 New York Times columnist Nicholas Kristof profiled Vision to Learn in his annual holiday gift guide, writing that “Vision to Learn’s model addresses real-world problems.”

=== 2026 mayoral campaign ===
In October 2025, Beutner announced his candidacy in the 2026 Los Angeles mayoral election. He dropped out of the race in February 2026 following the death of his daughter.
