= Andrés Chait =

American school superintendent

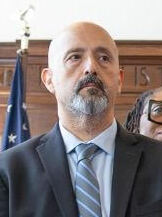
- Chait in 2026

Superintendent of the Los Angeles Unified School District
- Incumbent
- Assumed office June 24, 2026; Acting: February 27, 2026 – June 23, 2026
- Preceded by: Alberto M. Carvalho

Personal details
- Born: Andrés E. Chait; 1974 or 1975 (age 51–52)
- Education: University of California, Berkeley (BA); California State University, Los Angeles (MEd)
- Occupation: Academic administrator, teacher

Andrés E. Chait is an American educator and academic administrator, who has served as the Superintendent of the Los Angeles Unified School District since June 24, 2026. He previously served in the role in an acting capacity, following the suspension of Alberto M. Carvalho, from February 27, 2026, until his appointment to the permanent role.

== Early life and education ==
Chait graduated from the University of California, Berkeley with a Bachelor of Arts in sociology, before going on to earn a Master of Education Administration from California State University, Los Angeles.

== Career ==
Chait has spent his entire career with the Los Angeles Unified School District, beginning as an elementary school teacher at Queen Anne Place Elementary in the Mid-Wilshire neighborhood of Los Angeles. As the district's chief of school operations, he oversaw school safety, sports, and the Office of Emergency Management.

Chait was officially appointed as Superintendent of the Los Angeles Unified School District on June 24, 2026, by unanimous vote of the LAUSD Board, following Carvalho's resignation three days earlier.
