= Drug Strategies =

U.S. nonprofit research institute

Drug Strategies is a non-profit research institute located in Washington, D.C. Drug Strategies works to identify and promote more effective approaches to substance abuse and to increase public understanding of current research on what works and what does not.

Drug Strategies is led by former Assistant Secretary of State for International Narcotics and Law Enforcement Affairs Mathea Falco. Falco, a leading expert in drug abuse prevention and treatment, comments frequently on drug policy in the media. She is the author of The Making of A Drug Free America: Programs That Work. The Drug Strategies Board of Directors is chaired by Harvard Law Professor and former U.S. Deputy Attorney General Philip Heymann. Current Board members include Marian Wright Edelman, President of the Children's Defense Fund; James R. Jones, former U.S. Ambassador to Mexico; Michael Kantor, former Secretary of Commerce; Dr. David Aaron Kessler, former FDA Commissioner; Mark A.R. Kleiman, Chairman of BOTEC Analysis Corporation; and Thomas Schelling, Nobel laureate in Economics, along with other notable figures in the fields of international drug policy and public health. David Kessler's best selling book, The End of Overeating: Taking Control of the Insatiable American Appetite, refers to the work of Drug Strategies.

Drug Strategies has produced numerous publications, including Making the Grade: A Guide to School Drug Prevention Programs and Treating Teens: A Guide To Adolescent Drug Programs. The Treating Teens publication features an online companion guide designed to help parents, teachers, judges, counselors and other concerned adults make better choices about teen substance abuse treatment. The guide's Programs section contains extensive information about teen substance abuse treatment programs nationwide. Drug Strategies also offers the online resource Teen Substance Use for reliable information related to teen substance use prevention, education, treatment, and recovery.

Drug Strategies created the Nancy Dickerson Whitehead Awards in 1999 and presented them annually for ten years to print and broadcast journalists who reported with excellence on drug issues. A distinguished Awards Committee provided overall guidance. Members included Dickerson Whitehead's friends and colleagues: Marie Brenner, Vanity Fair; Joan Ganz Cooney, Children's Television Workshop; Walter Cronkite, Cronkite/Ward & Company; John Dickerson, journalist; Bill Moyers, Public Affairs TV; Peggy Noonan, The Wall Street Journal; Diane Sawyer, ABC-TV; Lesley Stahl, 60 Minutes; Mark Whitaker, Newsweek; and Katharine Graham, The Washington Post (until her death in 2001).

Bubblemonkey.com created by Drug Strategies, provides adolescents anonymous access to information on substance abuse and treatment centers. The interactive website is also available in Spanish (changobomba.com), and offers self-assessment tests, Q&A with experts, and location-specific information on substance abuse programs.

Drug Strategies and the Harvard Law School's International Center for Criminal Justice co-hosted two working groups on transnational organized crime in April and October 2011, which were attended by policy experts from the United States, Colombia, and Spain, including a number of Mexican officials at the federal, state, and local levels.

Drug Strategies, in collaboration with Schell Games, created Tunnel Tail, a free mobile phone app launched in 2012. Developed for the BEST Foundation, the app targeted adolescents 11–13 years old, when youth begin experimenting with alcohol, tobacco, and drugs. A paper detailing a preliminary study of Tunnel Tail's effects was presented at the 2014 Games for Health Europe conference and published in the conference proceedings.

In 2015, Drug Strategies and Harvard Law School's International Center for Criminal Justice co-hosted a two-day seminar sponsored by the Radcliffe Institute for Advanced Study addressing lessons from the United States' 40-year war on drugs. A multidisciplinary panel of experts explored innovative approaches to drug policy and programs and covered topics ranging from domestic law enforcement to adolescent drug prevention programs.
