= Roy Romer =

American politician (born 1928)

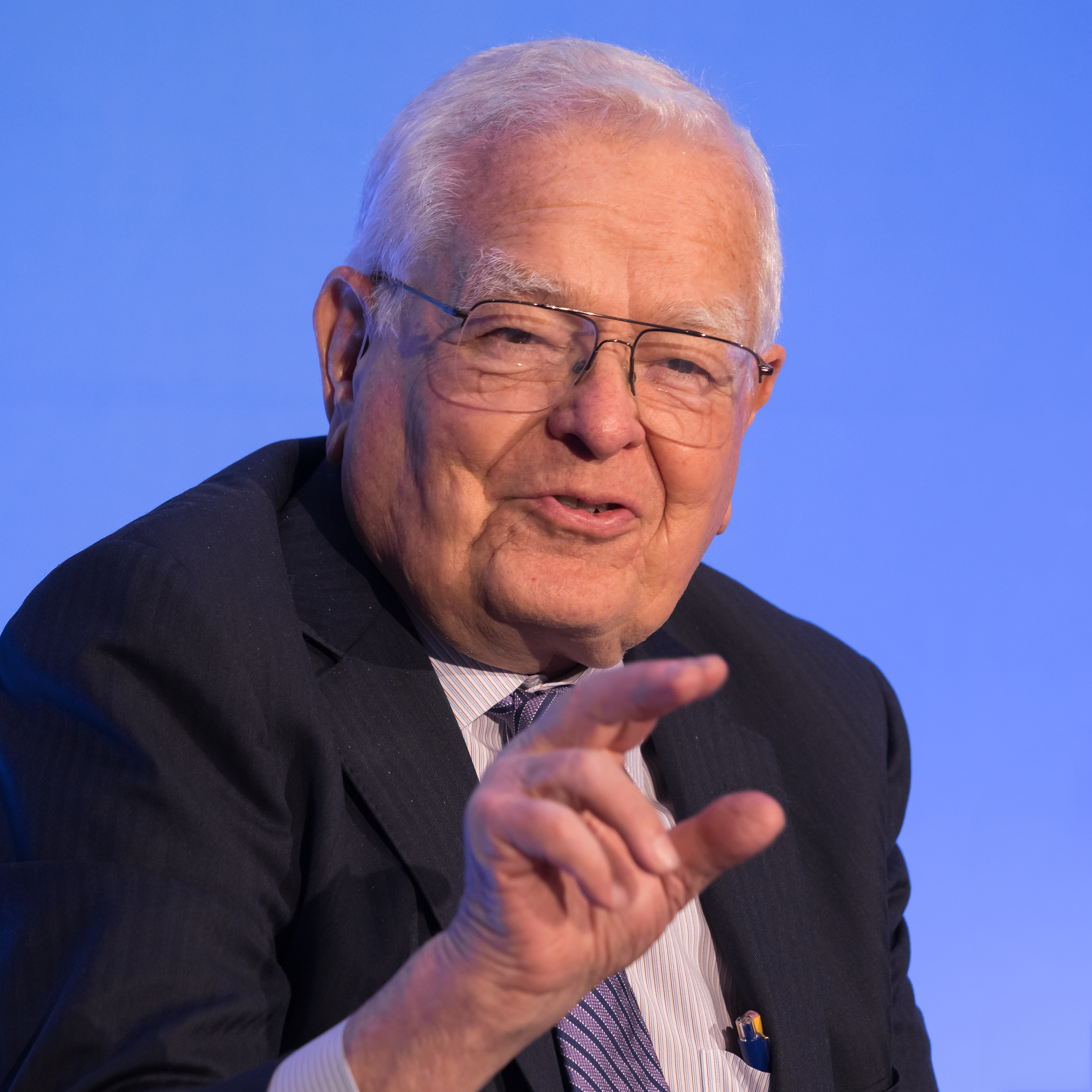
- Romer in 2019

Superintendent of the Los Angeles Unified School District
- In office June 7, 2000 – November 13, 2006
- Preceded by: Ramon C. Cortines (acting)
- Succeeded by: David L. Brewer III

General Chair of the Democratic National Committee
- In office January 21, 1997 – September 25, 1999 Serving with Steven Grossman (National Chair)
- Preceded by: Chris Dodd
- Succeeded by: Ed Rendell

Chair of the National Governors Association
- In office August 4, 1992 – August 17, 1993
- Preceded by: John Ashcroft
- Succeeded by: Carroll A. Campbell Jr.

39th Governor of Colorado
- In office January 13, 1987 – January 12, 1999
- Lieutenant: Mike Callihan; Samuel H. Cassidy; Gail Schoettler
- Preceded by: Richard Lamm
- Succeeded by: Bill Owens

Treasurer of Colorado
- In office March 23, 1977 – January 13, 1987
- Governor: Richard Lamm
- Preceded by: Sam Brown
- Succeeded by: Gail Schoettler

Personal details
- Born: Roy Rudolf Romer; October 31, 1928 (age 98) Garden City, Kansas, U.S.
- Party: Democratic
- Spouse: Beatrice Miller (m. 1953; died 2023)
- Children: 7, including Paul and Chris
- Education: Colorado State University (BA); University of Colorado, Boulder (LLB); Yale University (attended)

Military service
- Branch: United States Air Force
- Conflict: Korean War

Roy Rudolf Romer (born October 31, 1928) is an American politician who served as the 39th governor of Colorado from 1987 to 1999, and subsequently as the Superintendent of the Los Angeles Unified School District from 2000 to 2006. Romer is a member of the Democratic Party. He is the father of Paul Romer, a recipient of the 2018 Nobel Memorial Prize in Economics. Since the death of George Ariyoshi in April 2026, he is the oldest living former governor of any U.S. state and is the last living former American governor born in the 1920s.

== Background and personal life ==
Romer was born in Garden City, Kansas, on October 31, 1928, the son of Margaret Elizabeth (Snyder) and Irving Rudolph Romer. He grew up in the southeastern Colorado town of Holly. Romer received a bachelor's degree in agricultural economics from Colorado State University in 1950, where he served for one year as President of the Associated Students of Colorado State University. He later received a law degree from the University of Colorado School of Law in 1952. He also studied ethics for one year at Yale Divinity School, and was a legal officer in the U.S. Air Force.

Romer was married to Beatrice Miller Romer for 70 years, until her death in 2023. They had seven children, including Paul Romer, a Nobel Prize-winning economist, and Chris Romer, who was elected to a Colorado State Senate seat from Denver in 2006. His granddaughter, Rachel Romer is the co-founder and CEO of Guild Education.

== Political career ==
=== Colorado state government ===
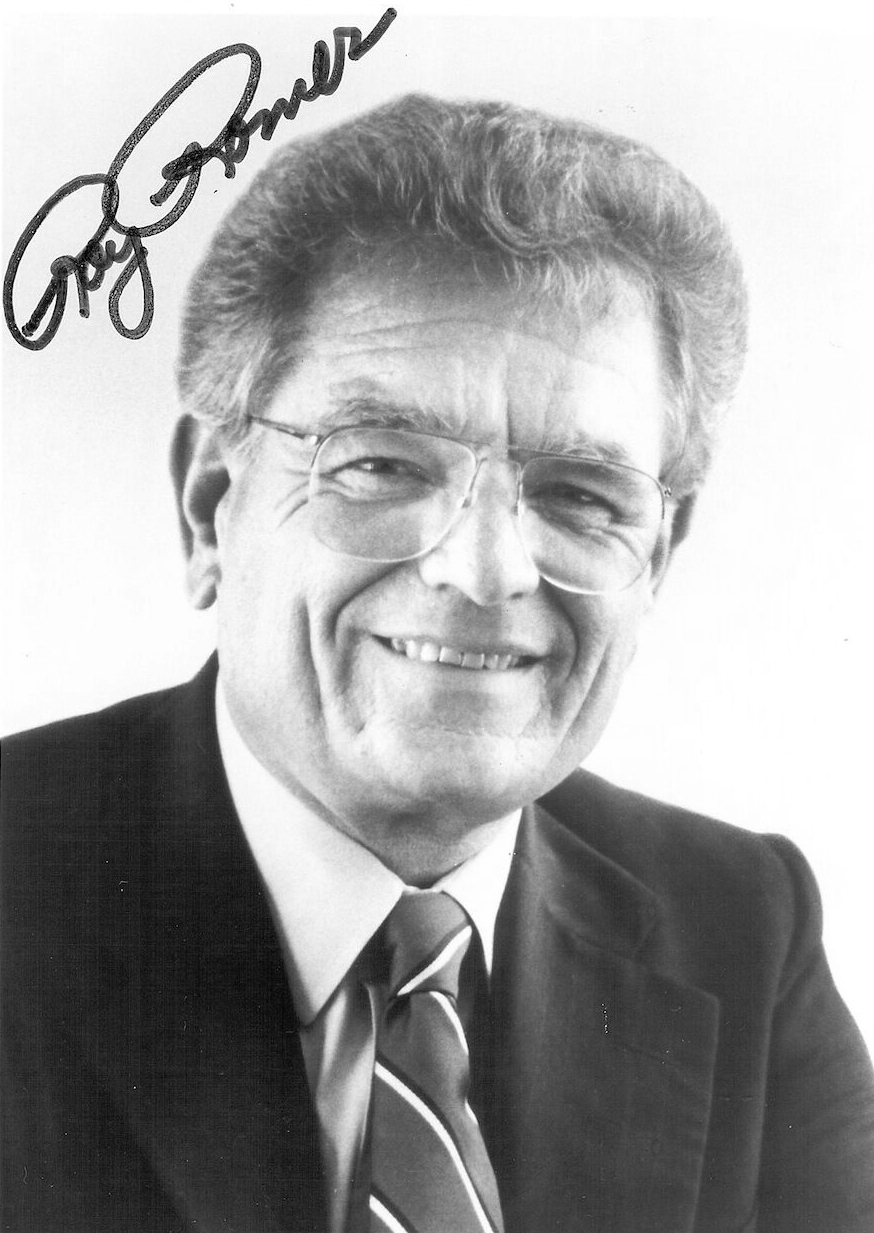
Romer as governor.

Romer served in the Colorado House of Representatives from 1958 to 1962 and in the Colorado Senate from 1962 to 1966. In 1966, Romer unsuccessfully challenged Republican U.S. Senator Gordon Allott.

Romer was Colorado State Treasurer from 1977 to 1987 (winning re-election to full four-year terms in 1978 and 1982), and a member of the governor's cabinet. Romer was first elected as governor in 1986, and re-elected in 1990 and 1994; he was the second Colorado governor to serve three terms. In 1997, Romer, along with Utah Governor Michael O. Leavitt and Wyoming Governor Jim Geringer, led a bipartisan team of 19 state governors in the founding of Western Governors University.

=== National political positions ===
Romer chaired the Democratic Governors Association in 1991. In 1992, he was co-chairman of the Democratic National Platform Committee. Romer served as national vice chair of the Democratic Leadership Council, and was a national co-chairman of the Clinton-Gore '96 campaign. In 1997, Romer was elected to serve as general chairman of the Democratic National Committee.

From 1992 to 1993, Romer served as chair of the National Governors Association.

=== Romer v. Evans ===
In law, his name is associated with the anti-discrimination suit Romer v. Evans that was brought to the Supreme Court during his tenure as Governor of Colorado. Though he was opposed to the amendment to the Constitution of Colorado in question, he defended the law, which prevented protected status based upon homosexuality or bisexuality, in state and federal court in his position as Governor during litigation. The Supreme Court ultimately ruled against the state's defense of Amendment 2, that it had “a rational relationship to legitimate state interests". The Court then invalidated Amendment 2 under the due process clause of the Fourteenth Amendment of the Federal Constitution. The state ultimately failed to give a "rational basis" to the purpose of the law. The case did not go as far to ruling that gays and lesbians are protected as intermediate or strict scrutiny under the Fourteenth Amendment and left that question to lower federal and state courts to decide.

== Professional activities ==
On June 7, 2000, he became Superintendent of the Los Angeles Unified School District, where he served for six years. On October 12, 2006, the Los Angeles Board of Education unanimously named David L. Brewer III as his successor.

On April 25, 2007, Roy Romer began his service as the chairman and lead spokesman for Strong American Schools, a nonprofit project responsible for running Ed in 08, an information and initiative campaign funded by the Bill and Melinda Gates Foundation and the Eli and Edythe Broad foundation, aimed at encouraging 2008 presidential contenders to include education in their campaign policies.

== Honors and awards ==
In 2008, Roy Romer Middle School in Los Angeles was named after him and it was first opened to students in September of that year.

Party political offices
Preceded by Robert Lee Knous	Democratic nominee for U.S. Senator from Colorado (Class 2); 1966	Succeeded by Floyd Haskell
Preceded by Richard Lamm	Democratic nominee Governor of Colorado; 1986, 1990, 1994	Succeeded by Gail Schoettler
Preceded by Dick Celeste	Chair of the Democratic Governors Association; 1990–1991	Succeeded by John D. Waihe'e III
Preceded by Chris Dodd	General Chair of the Democratic National Committee; 1997–1999; Served alongside: Steven Grossman (National Chair)	Succeeded by Ed Rendell
Political offices
Preceded by Sam Brown	Treasurer of Colorado; 1977–1987	Succeeded by Gail Schoettler
Preceded by Richard Lamm	Governor of Colorado; 1987–1999	Succeeded by Bill Owens
Preceded by John Ashcroft	Chair of the National Governors Association; 1992–1993	Succeeded by Carroll A. Campbell Jr.
Academic offices
Preceded by Ramon C. Cortines; Acting	Superintendent of the Los Angeles Unified School District; 2000–2006	Succeeded by David L. Brewer III
Honorary titles
Preceded by George Ariyoshi	Oldest living American governor 2026–present	Current holder
U.S. order of precedence (ceremonial)
Preceded by Martha McSally as Former US Senator	Order of precedence of the United States; Within Colorado	Succeeded by Bill Owens as Former Governor
Preceded by Dave Heineman as Former Governor	Order of precedence of the United States; Outside Colorado	Succeeded by Bill Owens as Former Governor
