= Charlene Barshefsky =

American trade negotiator (born 1950)

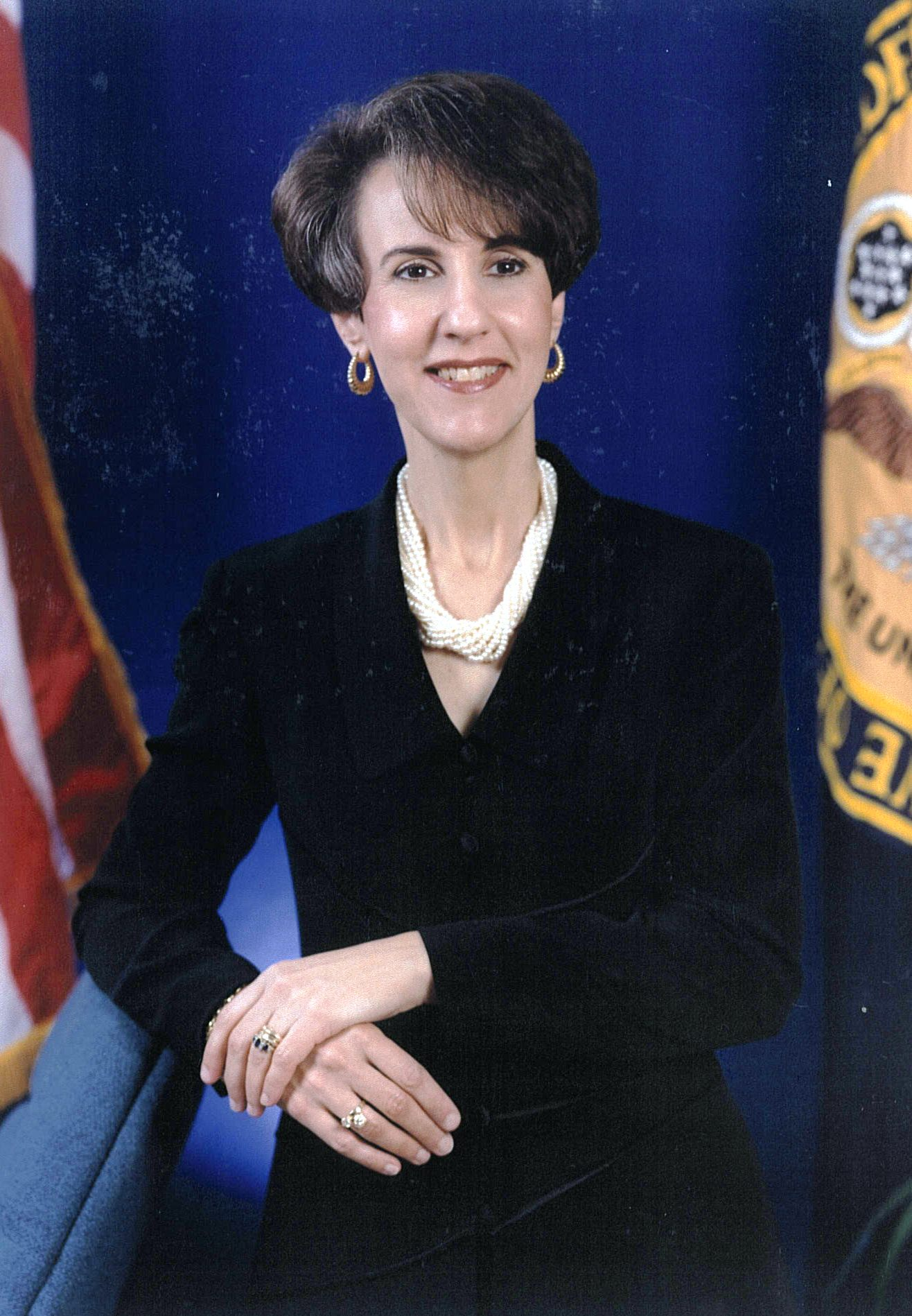
- Barshefsky, c. 1997

12th United States Trade Representative
- In office April 12, 1996 – January 20, 2001; Acting: April 12, 1996 – March 18, 1997
- President: Bill Clinton
- Preceded by: Mickey Kantor
- Succeeded by: Robert Zoellick

Deputy United States Trade Representative
- In office May 1993 – April 1996
- President: Bill Clinton
- Preceded by: Julius Katz
- Succeeded by: Richard W. Fisher

Personal details
- Born: August 11, 1950 (age 76) Chicago, Illinois, U.S.
- Party: Democratic
- Spouse: Edward Cohen
- Education: University of Wisconsin, Madison (BA); Catholic University (JD)

Charlene Barshefsky (born August 11, 1950) is an American lawyer. She served as United States Trade Representative from 1997 to 2001. She was the Deputy U.S. Trade Representative from 1993 to 1997. She is a partner at the law firm of Wilmer Cutler Pickering Hale and Dorr. She is also an advisor at Moelis & Company and a participant of the Task Force on U.S.-China Policy convened by the Asia Society's Center on US-China Relations.

== Early life, education, and career ==
Barshefsky was raised in a Jewish family on the North Side of Chicago, the daughter of Polish immigrant parents: Getzel "Gustave" Barshefsky, a chemical engineer from Rajgród (1912–1995), and Miriam Rosen (1912–2011), a substitute teacher from Łomża. Her father's family surname had been Barszczewski (feminine Barszczewska) in Polish. She has an elder brother, Alvin Barshefsky, and an elder sister, Annette Weinshank. In 1968, Barshefsky graduated from Von Steuben High School. In 1972, Barshefsky graduated from the University of Wisconsin–Madison with a bachelor's degree, double majoring in English and political science. In 1975, she earned her J.D. from the Columbus School of Law of The Catholic University of America.

Barshefsky was nominated by former President Bill Clinton to serve as Deputy U.S. Trade Representative along with Rufus Yerxa and Richard W. Fisher. In 1999 she was the primary negotiator with China's Zhu Rongji, laying out the terms for China's eventual entry into the World Trade Organization in December 2001. Her negotiations have been analyzed in Harvard Business School case studies.

== Legal practice ==
As of June 2012, Barshefsky is a senior international partner at WilmerHale. Her legal practice focuses on international business transactions, commercial agreements, and regulatory impediments to exporting and investment. She also advises foreign corporations on commercial and regulatory issues in the United States.

== Board memberships ==
Outside of her legal practice, Barshefsky participates in several professional organizations. She is the chair of the National Committee on US-China Relations' board of directors, a board member of the America-China Society, a fellow of the Foreign Policy Association, and a member of the American Academy of Diplomacy and the Trilateral Commission. She also serves on the boards of Intel, American Express, Estée Lauder Companies, and the Howard Hughes Medical Institute. She is a member of the Council on Foreign Relations. She also sits on the advisory board for America Abroad Media.

== Personal life ==
Barshefsky lives in Washington, D.C., with her husband.

== Honors and awards ==
- Named one of "The Decade's Most Influential Lawyers" (40 lawyers total) by The National Law Journal in the regulatory category.
- Included in BusinessWeek's list of "Top Female Corporate Directors"
- Named one of "50 Most Influential Women Lawyers in America" by The National Law Journal in 2007
- Lifetime Achievement Award from Chambers & Partners in 2007
- "Top Lawyers in Washington, D.C." in international trade by the Washingtonianmagazine for 2007, 2009, and 2011
- Outstanding Achievement award at the Euromoney Legal Media Group's "America's Women in Business Law Awards"

Political offices
Preceded by Mickey Kantor	United States Trade Representative; 1996–2001; Acting: 1996–1997	Succeeded by Robert Zoellick
