= Vision to Learn =

U.S. nonprofit providing free optometry services to children in low-income communities

- Founder: Austin Beutner
- Type: Charitable organization
- Tax ID no.: 45-3457853
- Legal status: 501(c)(3) organization
- Purpose: "Provide free exams and glasses to students in low-income communities"
- Headquarters: 12100 Wilshire Blvd Suite 12575
- Location: Los Angeles, US
- Chair: Austin Beutner
- Key people: Mickey Kantor, co-chair
- Main organ: Board of directors
- Website: visiontolearn.org

Vision to Learn is a US nonprofit organization that provides free optometry services to children in low-income communities.

== History ==
Founded by philanthropist Austin Beutner in 2012, the organization started with a single mobile clinic in Los Angeles, California, staffed by optometrists.

Vision to Learn had served over 25,000 children by 2014, and by 2019, it had 25 mobile clinics in 12 states.

Ann Hollister, the organization's president, told The Washington Post in 2017 that 70% of Vision to Learn's revenue originated from philanthropy, while the other 30% came from partnerships with organizations like the Los Angeles Clippers and the Los Angeles Unified School District.

In April 2018, the district threatened to cancel a $6M contract with the charity, saying it was behind schedule meeting its commitments. Hollister countered that the district did not have the most recent information and that the delays were due to miscommunications between the district and the schools.

Vision to Learn partnered with Johns Hopkins University from 2016 to 2021, and with eyewear retailer Warby Parker as part of the city initiative "Vision for Baltimore". A study done by the university found that for students most behind in school, receiving eyeglasses narrowed their achievement gap equivalent to four to six months of learning.

As of August 2023, Vision to Learn was active in 15 states and the District of Columbia, and had administered 2.3 million optometry screenings, and distributed 390,000 pairs of eyeglasses to children.

As of April 2026, Mickey Kantor is its co-chair, and its board of directors includes Jake Winebaum and had included Laphonza Butler (2022).

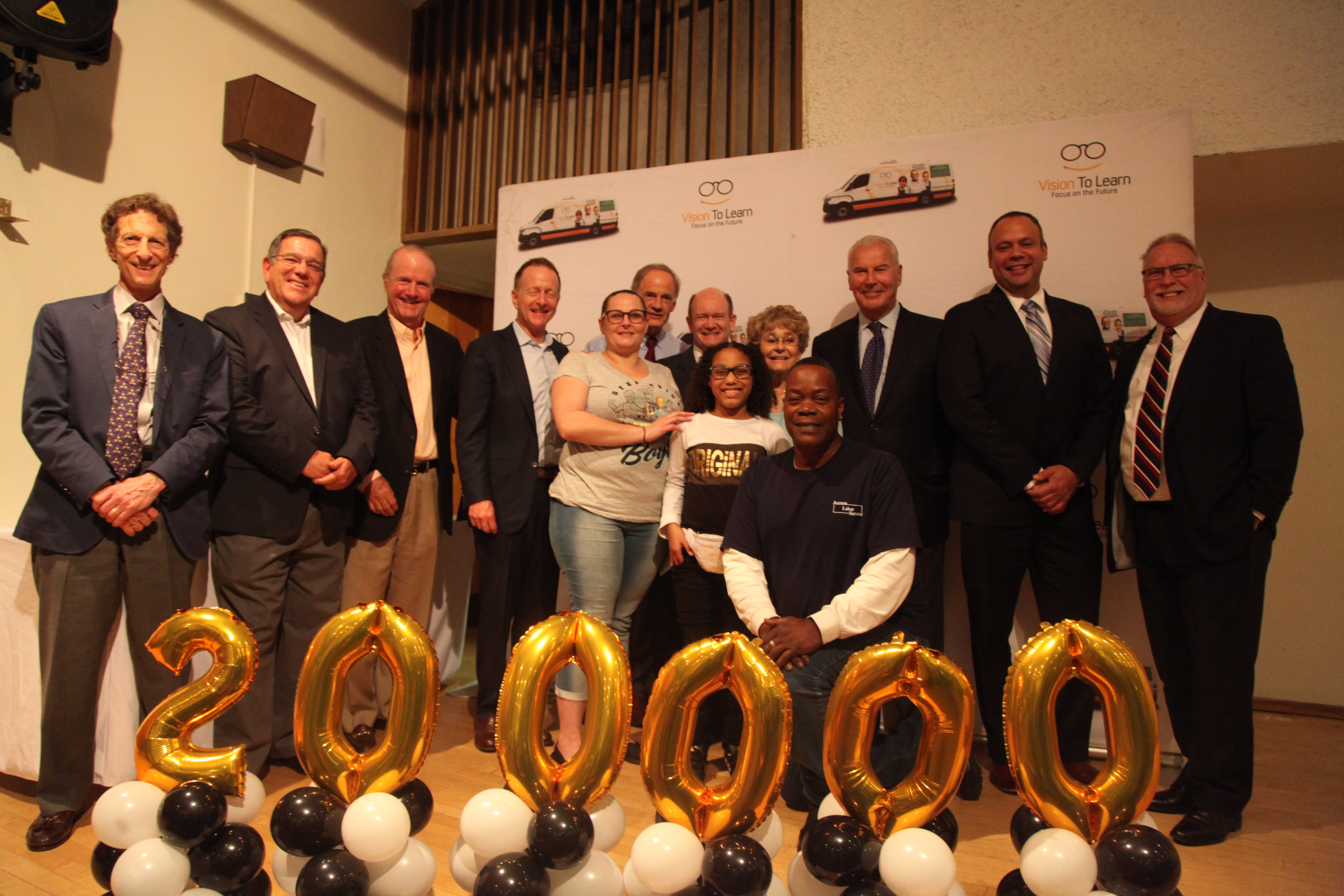
Celebrating its 200,000th student served in 2019
