= Michelle King (educator) =

American educator (1961–2019)

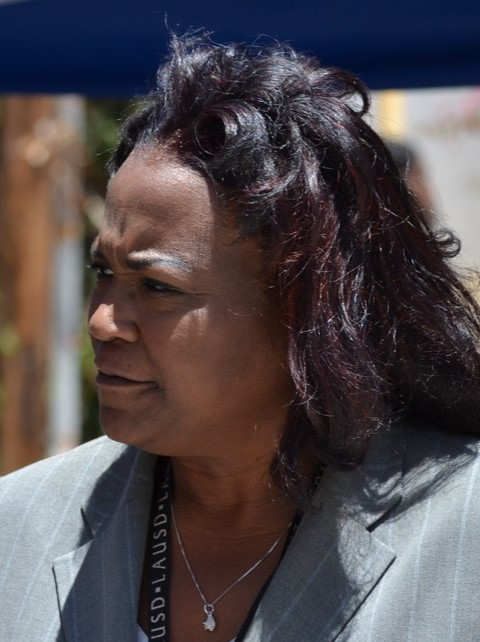
- King in 2013
- Born: March 9, 1961; Los Angeles, California, U.S.
- Died: February 2, 2019 (aged 57)
- Education: B.A., at University of California, Los Angeles
- Occupation: Educator
- Employer: Los Angeles Unified School District
- Title: Superintendent of the Los Angeles Unified School District
- Children: 3

Michelle King (March 9, 1961 – February 2, 2019) was an American educator. She was the first black woman to serve as superintendent of the Los Angeles Unified School District (LAUSD), the second-largest school district in the United States. She was appointed in January 2016 by the Los Angeles Board of Education.

== Early life ==
King was born in Los Angeles, California. Her father was an attorney and her mother worked for the county. King attended schools in the district she would eventually lead. She was one of the few black students at Palisades High School, a school with wealthy and mostly white students. King excelled in academics and was also a cheerleader.

She attended the University of California, Los Angeles, hoping to enter the field of education. At UCLA she earned a bachelor's degree in biology. She later received a master of science in administration from Pepperdine University, and then completed her doctorate in education at the University of Southern California.

== Career ==
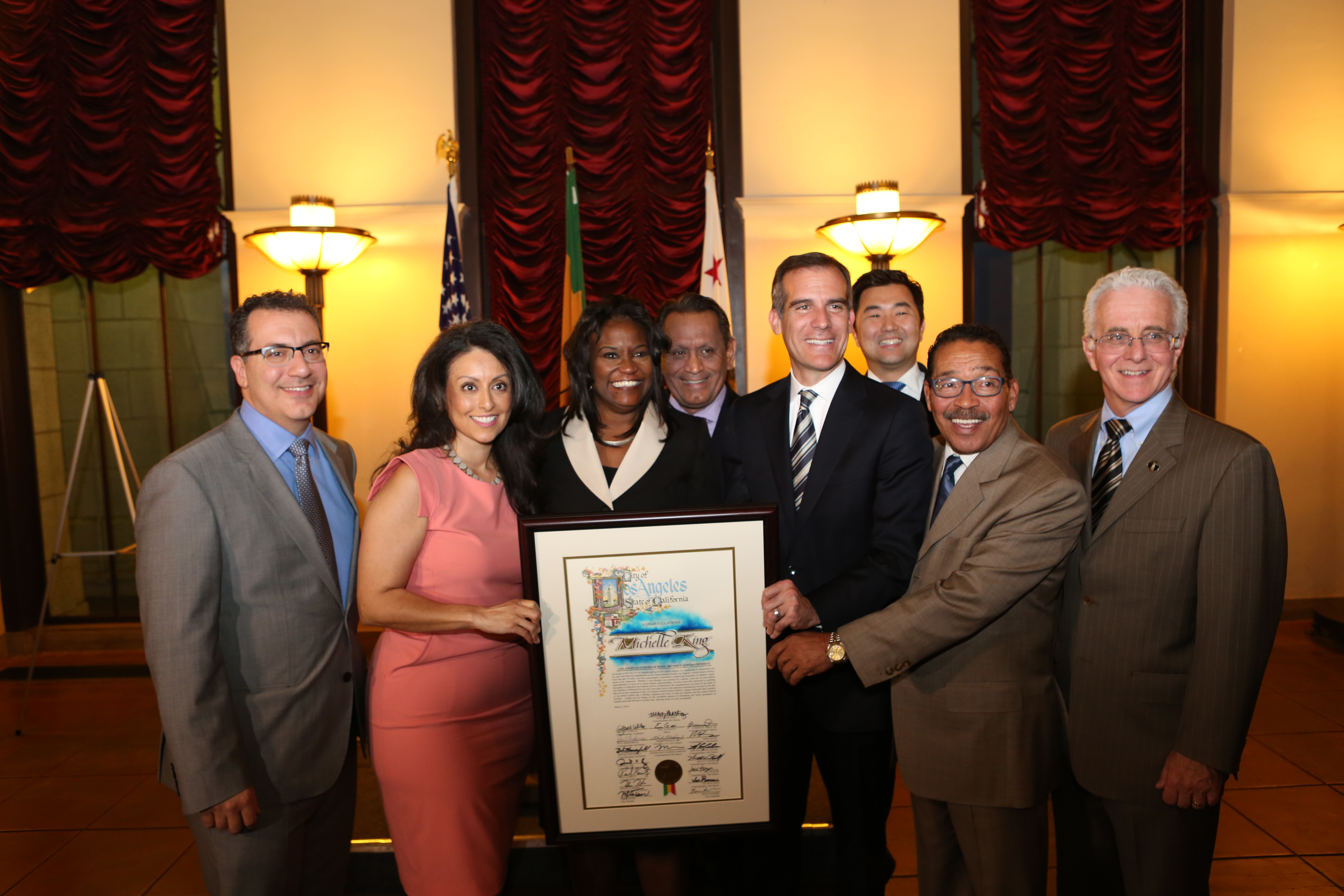
King being congratulated by Mayor Eric Garcetti and City Council in 2016.

King was a career employee of the district. She rose from classroom teacher, through leadership roles to lead the organization. LAUSD spans over 720 square miles with over 640,000 students, 900 schools, 187 public charter schools, 60,000 employees, and a $7.5 billion budget. She taught at Porter Junior High and Wright Middle School and became the principal at Hamilton High School. Under her leadership, Hamilton's test scores far exceeded annual improvement targets. In 2014 she became deputy superintendent under Superintendent John Deasy. She acceded to the top leadership position in January 2016.

King is credited with pushing the district's graduation rate to record levels. Her major initiative was to expand the number of schools with special programs as the district dealt with the impact of independently-operated charter schools. She retired in 2018 because of medical issues. Under her administration the district provided support to DACA students and protested changes in federal immigration policies. She stated, "I am concerned by this decision and its long-term impacts on the students, families and employees of L.A. Unified....These young immigrants have made valuable contributions to the community and the nation they consider their home, and they have earned the right to a permanent place in its history."

== Recognition ==
In 2015, King was named "Woman of the Year" by Women on Target, a non-profit advocacy group supporting leaders in Southern California's African-American community.

In 2017 National Association of School Superintendents named King Superintendent of the Year. That same year she received her doctorate in Education and Educational Leadership from USC.

== Personal life ==
King was divorced. She was a cancer patient and went on medical leave on September 15, 2017. She and the school district had intended for her to return by January 22, 2018, but she ultimately chose to stay on medical leave and retire at the end of the school year. She died on February 2, 2019.
