= Mickey Kantor =

American politician

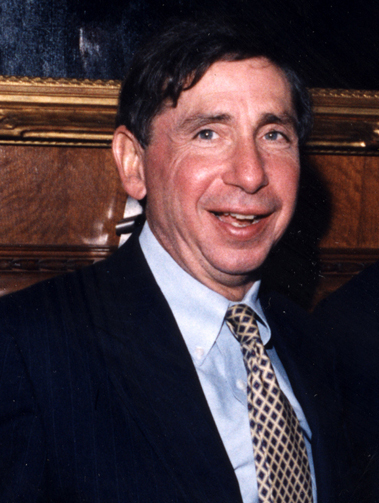

31st United States Secretary of Commerce
- In office April 12, 1996 – January 21, 1997
- President: Bill Clinton
- Preceded by: Ron Brown
- Succeeded by: Bill Daley

11th United States Trade Representative
- In office January 22, 1993 – April 12, 1996
- President: Bill Clinton
- Preceded by: Carla Hills
- Succeeded by: Charlene Barshefsky

Personal details
- Born: August 7, 1939 (age 86) Nashville, Tennessee, U.S.
- Party: Democratic
- Spouses: Valerie Woods (died 1978); Heidi Schulman (m. 1982)
- Children: 4
- Education: Vanderbilt University (BA); Georgetown University (JD)

Michael Kantor (born August 7, 1939) is an American attorney who served as the United States Trade Representative from 1993 to 1996 and United States Secretary of Commerce in 1996 and 1997.

== Early life and education ==
Born and raised in Nashville, Tennessee, Kantor comes from a family of Jewish furniture retailers led by his parents, including his father, Henry Kantor. Kantor earned a Bachelor of Arts degree in business and economics from Vanderbilt University in 1961. He then served four years as a supply officer in the United States Navy and subsequently earned a Juris Doctor from Georgetown University in 1968.

== Career ==
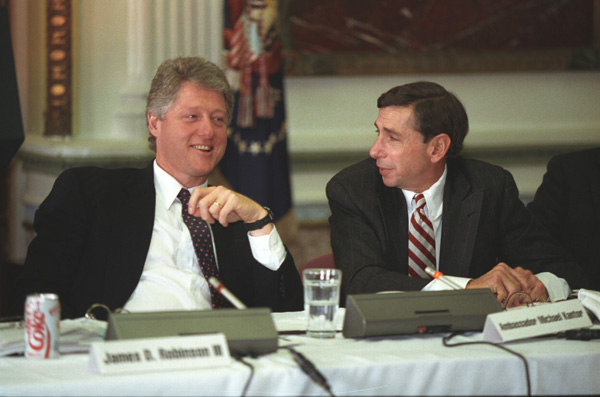
Kantor with President Bill Clinton in 1993

Initially, Kantor worked for the Legal Services Corporation, providing legal assistance to migrant farm workers. From 1976 to 1993, he practiced law with the Los Angeles law firm of Manatt, Phelps, Phillips & Kantor (now Manatt, Phelps & Phillips LLP), and was active in Democratic politics and fundraising. He formerly served and is founder of the LA Conservation Corps.

During the 1992 campaign, Kantor served as head of pre-transition planning for the Clinton administration, and then formally led transition planning once their election was certified.

An advocate of free trade, Kantor, as Trade Representative, led U.S. negotiations that created the World Trade Organization (WTO), such as the Uruguay Round, and North American Free Trade Agreement (NAFTA). Kantor also engaged in organizing the Miami Summit of the Americas and three meetings of the Asia-Pacific Economic Cooperation, including the U.S.-hosted First Leaders' Meeting. With the European Commission of the newly formed European Union, he expanded the trans-Atlantic market.

Kantor became United States Secretary of Commerce on April 12, 1996, succeeding Ron Brown, who had been killed in the 1996 Croatia USAF CT-43 crash.

Kantor practices law in the Los Angeles office of Mayer Brown, an international law firm based in Chicago. He is the board of directors co-chair of Vision to Learn and the University of Southern California Annenberg Center on Communication Leadership & Policy; a board officer of Drug Strategies; a leadership council member of the Sargent Shriver Center on Poverty Law; a steering committee member of Japan House; and a board member of Lexmark International, Inc. and the Pacific Council on International Policy.

== Personal life and honors ==
Kantor has been married to broadcast journalist Heidi Schulman since 1982, following the death of his first wife, Valerie Woods Kantor in a 1978 plane crash in San Diego. He has three children. Another son, Russell, died in a single-car crash in October, 1988, while a senior in high school.

He formerly served on the board of directors of CBRE, board of visitors for Georgetown Law, and international advisory board for FleishmanHillard. Kantor was awarded the Order of the Southern Cross by the government of Brazil in 2001.

== See also ==
- List of Jewish United States Cabinet members

Political offices
Preceded by Carla Hills	United States Trade Representative; 1993–1996	Succeeded by Charlene Barshefsky
Preceded by Ron Brown	United States Secretary of Commerce; 1996–1997	Succeeded by Bill Daley
U.S. order of precedence (ceremonial)
Preceded by Dan Glickman as Former U.S. Cabinet Member	Order of precedence of the United States as Former U.S. Cabinet Member	Succeeded by William Cohen as Former U.S. Cabinet Member
