= Superintendent of the Los Angeles Unified School District =

Education official in Los Angeles, California, US

- Type: Superintendent
- Appointer: Board of Education
- Term length: No fixed term
- Formation: 1854 (as City Superintendent of Common Schools)
- First holder: Stephen Clark Foster (as City Superintendent of Common Schools)
- Website: Official website

The Superintendent of the Los Angeles Unified School District is the chief administrative officer of the District selected by the District's Board of Education. Portuguese-American educator and former superintendent of Miami-Dade County Public Schools, Alberto M. Carvalho, has been serving as the District's superintendent since February 14, 2022.

== History ==
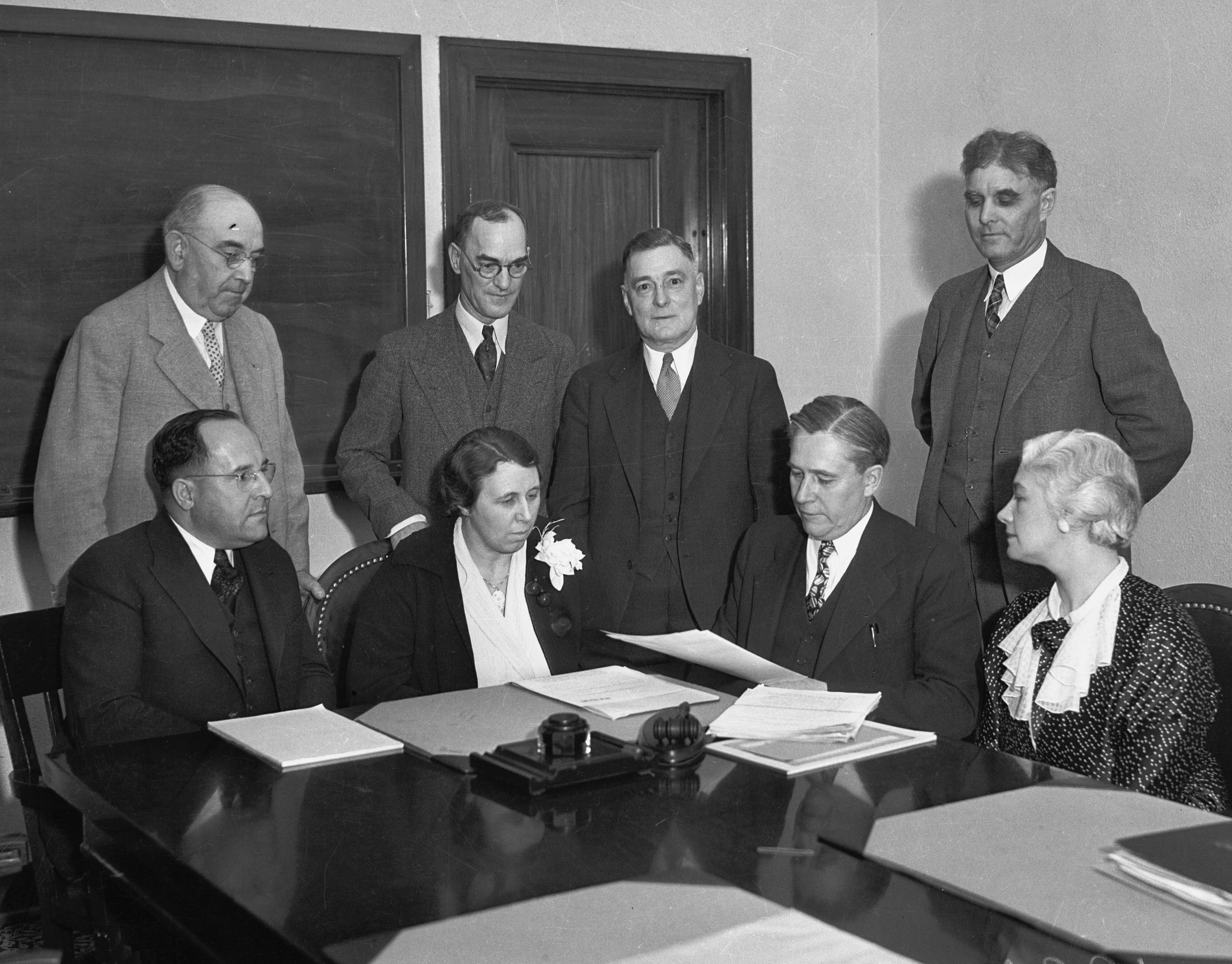
The Board of Education meeting with Superintendent Frank Bouelle (upper left), 1935.

With the first ordinance of establishing public schools passed by the Los Angeles Common Council in 1853, the ordinance stated that out of three appointed members of the Board of Education the chairman would act as Superintendent of Public Schools. The first officeholder was Joseph Lancaster Brent, who served until 1854. That year, Mayor Stephen Clark Foster was chosen by the other Board members and urged the need for improvements in the system. From 1853 to 1866, the superintendent was appointed by the Common Council. From 1866 to 1870, the office was elected via popular vote before being discontinued as the office did not have power nor authority to enforce decrees.

In 1872, the Common Council created the City Board of Education, which would have the power to appoint a superintendent, thieir first appointment being Dr. William T. Lucky in 1873. The first female superintendent was appointed in 1880, when Chloe B. Jones took office. The second female superintendent would be Susan Miller Dorsey, appointed in 1919 and the longest serving with 10 years. In 1961, the Los Angeles City School District and the Los Angeles City High School District merged to create the Los Angeles Unified School District, to which its first superintendent of all school in the district was Jack P. Crowther who fought cutbacks to the district.

In 2005 after his election, Mayor Antonio Villaraigosa attempted to gain control of the Los Angeles Unified School District as one of his top priorities. He did so with the passing of AB 1381 through the California State Legislature, which would remove the power from the Board of Education and give it to the superintendent who would be picked by a council made by mayors of the cities in LAUSD. The law was signed by Governor Arnold Schwarzenegger in 2006 before being struck down as unconstitutional in 2007. The first African-American superintendent would be Sidney A. Thompson in 1992, followed by David L. Brewer III in 2006. The first female African-American and first female superintendent in over 80 years would be Michelle King in 2016.

== Duties and powers ==
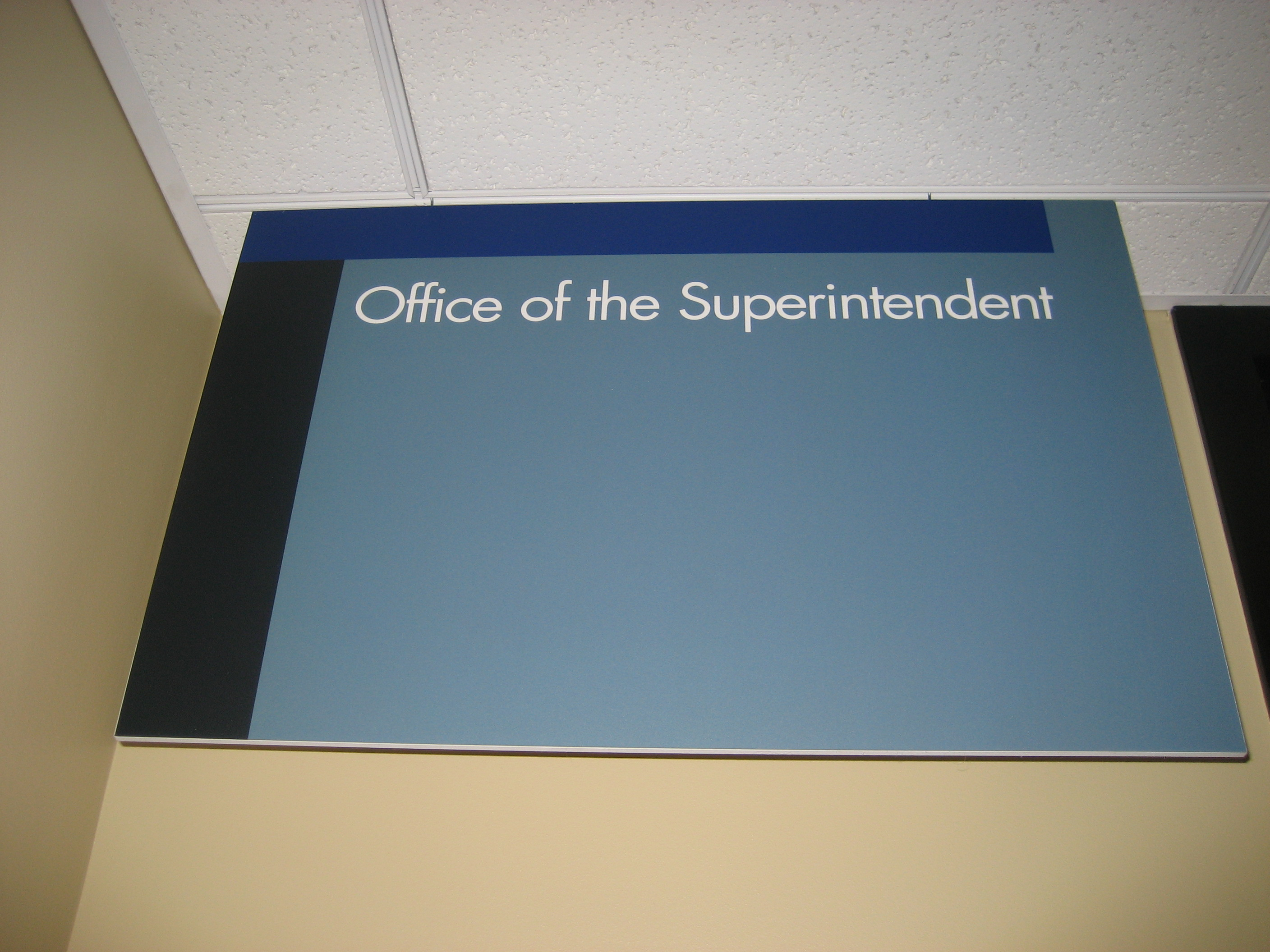
Superintendent office sign.

The superintendent is the chief administrative officer of the District and serves as the responsible local agency, able to delegate appropriate authority and responsibility to the Deputy Superintendent of Instruction with the direction of the Board of Education as well as able to supervise the Chief Special Education Officer and local district superintendents. The superintendent could gain special powers if the Board of Education declares an emergency; one of these times it was utilized was during the COVID-19 pandemic in California, when superintendent Austin Beutner used it to make fast-track deals.

== Succession ==
If a superintendent decides to step down from their post, the Board of Education approves a superintendent selection timeline for the district to find the next superintendent. During this time, an interim superintendent is appointed to serve as the head. After community and stakeholder input, the recruitment begins. After an interview process, a permanent superintendent is selected and their contract is finalized and approved by the Board of Education.

== List of superintendents ==
Interim superintendent

City Superintendent of Common Schools

Name	Photo	Tenure	Ref.
J. Lancaster Brent		1853–1854	
Stephen C. Foster		1854–1855	
William B. Osburn		1855–1856	
John S. Griffin		1856–1857	
J. Lancaster Brent		1857–1858	
E. J. C. Kewen		1858–1859	
William E. Boardman		1859–1862	
James H. Lander		1862	
A. F. Heinchman		1862–1863	
J. F. Mellus		1863	
Gustavus L. Mix		1863–1864	
Russel F. Hayes		1864–1865	
Elias Birdsall		1865–1866	
Joseph Huber Sr.		1866–1867	
H. D. Barrows		1867–1868	
Andrew Glassell		1868–1869	
T. H. Rose		1869–1870	
Vacant (1870–1873)			

Superintendent of Los Angeles City Schools

Name	Photo	Tenure	Ref.
William T. Lucky		1873–1876	
Charles H. Kimball		1876–1880	
Mrs. Chloe B. Jones		1880–1881	
James Miller Guinn		1881–1883	
Lyman D. Smith		1883–1885	
W. M. Freisner		1885–1893	
LeRoy D. Brown		1893–1894	
William Nicholas Hailman		1894	
Preston W. Search		1894–1895	
James A. Foshay		1895–1906	
Ernest Carroll Moore		1906–1910	
John Haywood Francis		1910–1916	
Albert Shiels		1916–1919	
Susan Miller Dorsey		1919–1929	
Frank A. Bouelle		1929–1937	
Vierling C. Kersey		1937–1939	
Alexander J. Stoddard		1949–1954	
Harry M. Howell		1954	
Claude Lamar Reeves		1954–1956	
Ellis Adams Jarvis		1956–1961	

Superintendent of the Los Angeles Unified School District

Name	Photo	Tenure	Ref.
Jack P. Crowther		1962–1970	
William J. Johnston		1971–1981	
Harry Handler		1981–1987	
Leonard M. Britton		1987–1990	
William R. Antón		1990–1992	
Sidney A. Thompson		1992–1997	
Ruben Zacarias		1997–2000	
Ramón C. Cortines		2000	
Roy Romer		2000–2006	
David L. Brewer III		2006–2008	
Ramón C. Cortines		2009–2011	
John Deasy		2011–2014	
Ramón C. Cortines		2014–2016	
Michelle King		2016–2018	
Vivian Ekchian		2018	
Austin Beutner		2018–2021	
Megan K. Reilly		2021–2022	
Alberto M. Carvalho		2022–2026	
Andrés Chait		2026–present	
