= Northridge High School =

Northridge High School may refer to:

- Northridge High School (Alabama) — Tuscaloosa, Alabama
- Northridge High School (Colorado) — Greeley, Colorado
- Northridge High School (Indiana) — Middlebury, Indiana
- Northridge High School (Dayton, Ohio)
- Northridge High School (Johnstown, Ohio)
- Northridge High School (Layton, Utah)
- Northridge Academy High School — Los Angeles, California

== See also ==
- Northbridge High School
