= Los Angeles Unified School District =

California school district serving almost all of Los Angeles and surrounding areas

Address
- 333 South Beaudry AVE Los Angeles, California, 90017; United States

District information
- Type: Public
- Grades: Pre K–12
- Established: July 1, 1961; 65 years ago
- Superintendent: Andrés E. Chait
- Schools: 1,535
- Budget: $12.6 billion
- NCES District ID: 0622710

Students and staff
- Students: 565,479 (2025–26)
- Teachers: 24,223 (2025–25)
- Student–teacher ratio: 19.20 (2024–25)

Other information
- Teachers' unions: United Teachers Los Angeles, California Teachers Association
- Communities Served: Los Angeles and surrounding areas
- Website: lausd.org

Los Angeles Unified School District (LAUSD) is a public school district in Los Angeles County, California. It is the largest public school system in California in terms of number of students and the second-largest public school district in the United States, with only the New York City Department of Education having a larger student population.

The school district's jurisdiction area consists of almost all of the city of Los Angeles and all or portions of several adjoining cities and unincorporated areas in southwestern Los Angeles County. LAUSD has its own police force, the Los Angeles School Police Department, which was established in 1948 to provide police services for LAUSD schools. The LAUSD enrolls a third of the preschoolers in Los Angeles County, and operates almost as many buses as the Los Angeles County Metropolitan Transportation Authority. The LAUSD school construction program rivals the Big Dig in terms of expenditures, and LAUSD cafeterias serve about 500,000 meals a day, rivaling the output of local McDonald's restaurants.

During the 2022–23 school year, LAUSD served 565,479 students, including 11,795 early childhood education students and 27,740 adult students. During the same school year, it had 24,710 teachers and 49,231 other employees. It is the second largest employer in Los Angeles County after the county government. The school district's budget for the 2021–22 school year was $10.7 billion, increasing to $12.6 billion for the 2022–23 school year.

LAUSD has been criticized in the past for extremely crowded schools with large class sizes, high drop-out and expulsion rates, low academic performance in many schools, poor maintenance and incompetent administration. In 2007, LAUSD's dropout rate was 26 percent for grades 9 through 12. In 2013, evidence was found that the district was showing improvement, both in terms of dropout and graduation rates. An ambitious renovation program intended to help ease the overcrowded conditions has been completed. As part of its school-construction project, LAUSD opened two high schools (Santee Education Complex and South East) in 2005 and four high schools (Arleta, Contreras Learning Complex, Panorama, and East Valley) in 2006.

== History ==
=== Early history (1870–1961) ===
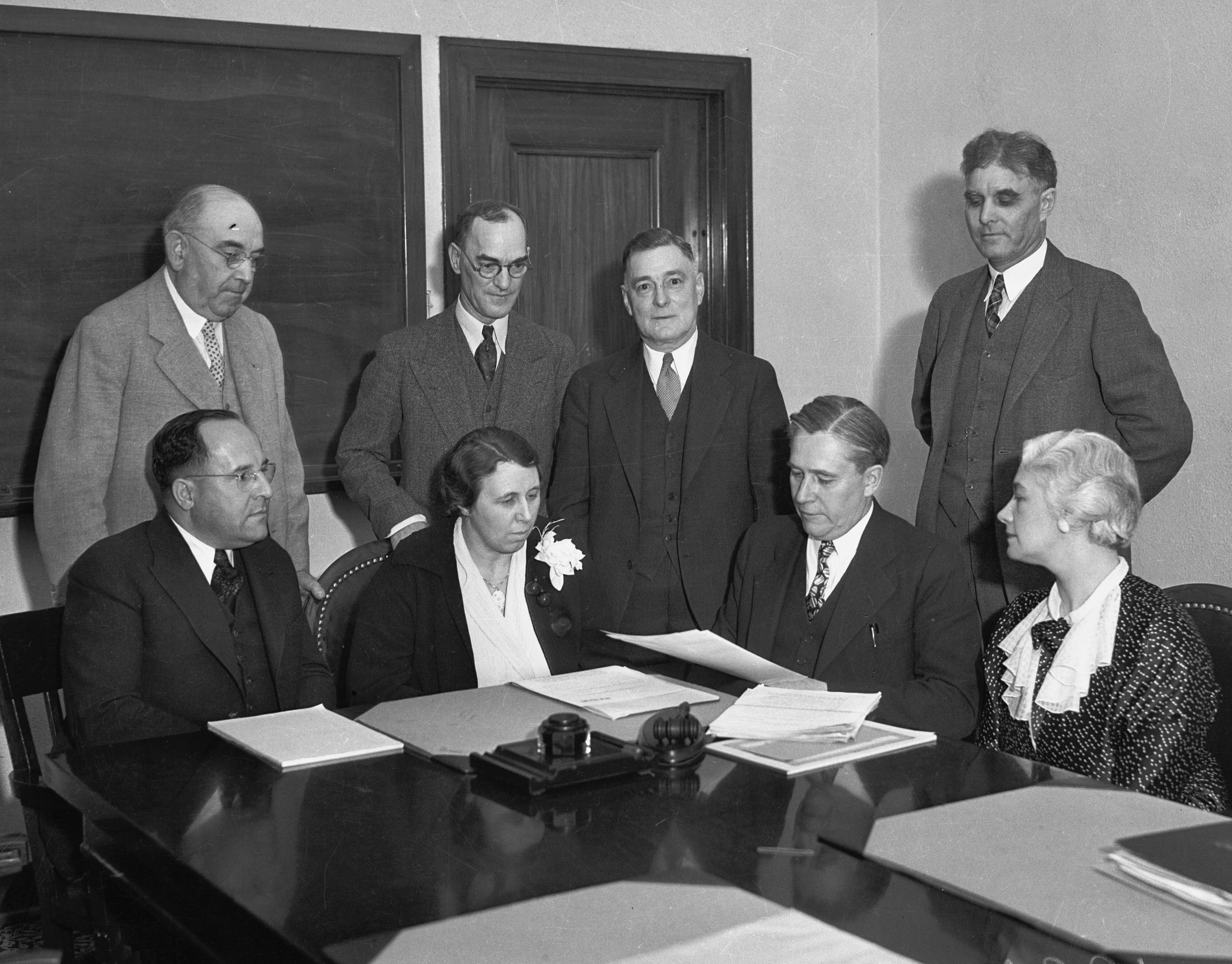
A Los Angeles Board of Education meeting; 1935

The Los Angeles Unified School District was preceded by two districts: the Los Angeles City School District, formed in 1870, and the Los Angeles City High School District, formed in 1890. The LACSD was formed to serve elementary and junior high students, originally starting with the same borders of the city of Los Angeles and annexing various smaller elementary school districts throughout its existence. The LACHSD was catered to high school students, and was a result of annexations of high school districts in the area.

=== Formation (1961–1962) ===
On July 1, 1961, the Los Angeles City School District and the Los Angeles City High School District merged, forming the Los Angeles Unified School District. The merger left the Topanga School District and the Las Virgenes Union School District as separate remnants of the Los Angeles City High School District. The Las Virgenes district changed its name to the West County Union High School District. LAUSD annexed the Topanga district on July 1, 1962. Since the Las Virgenes Union School District had the same boundary as the remaining West County Union High School District, West County ceased to exist.

=== Desegregation (1961–1980) ===
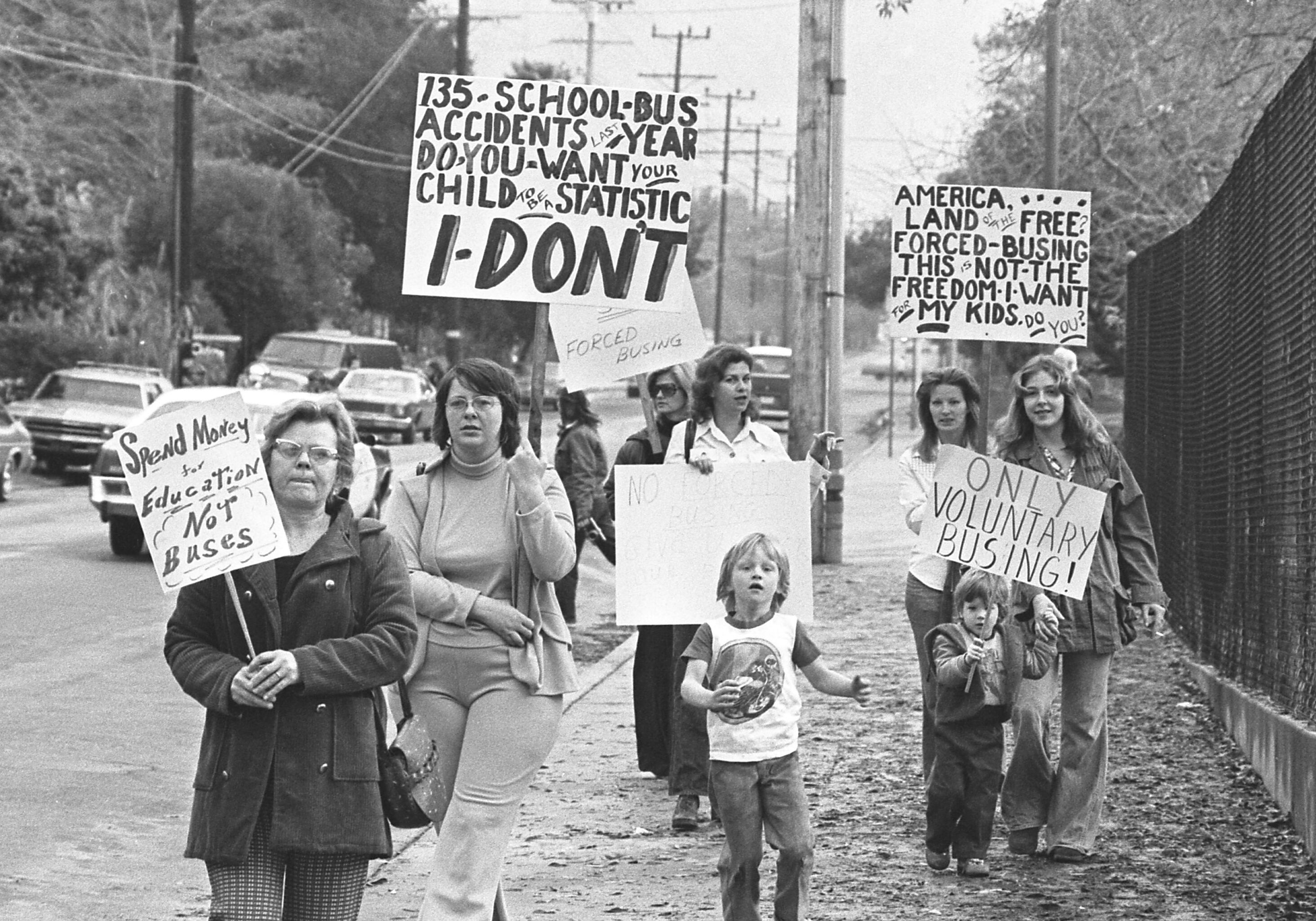
Mothers and their children picketing against mandatory busing; 1977

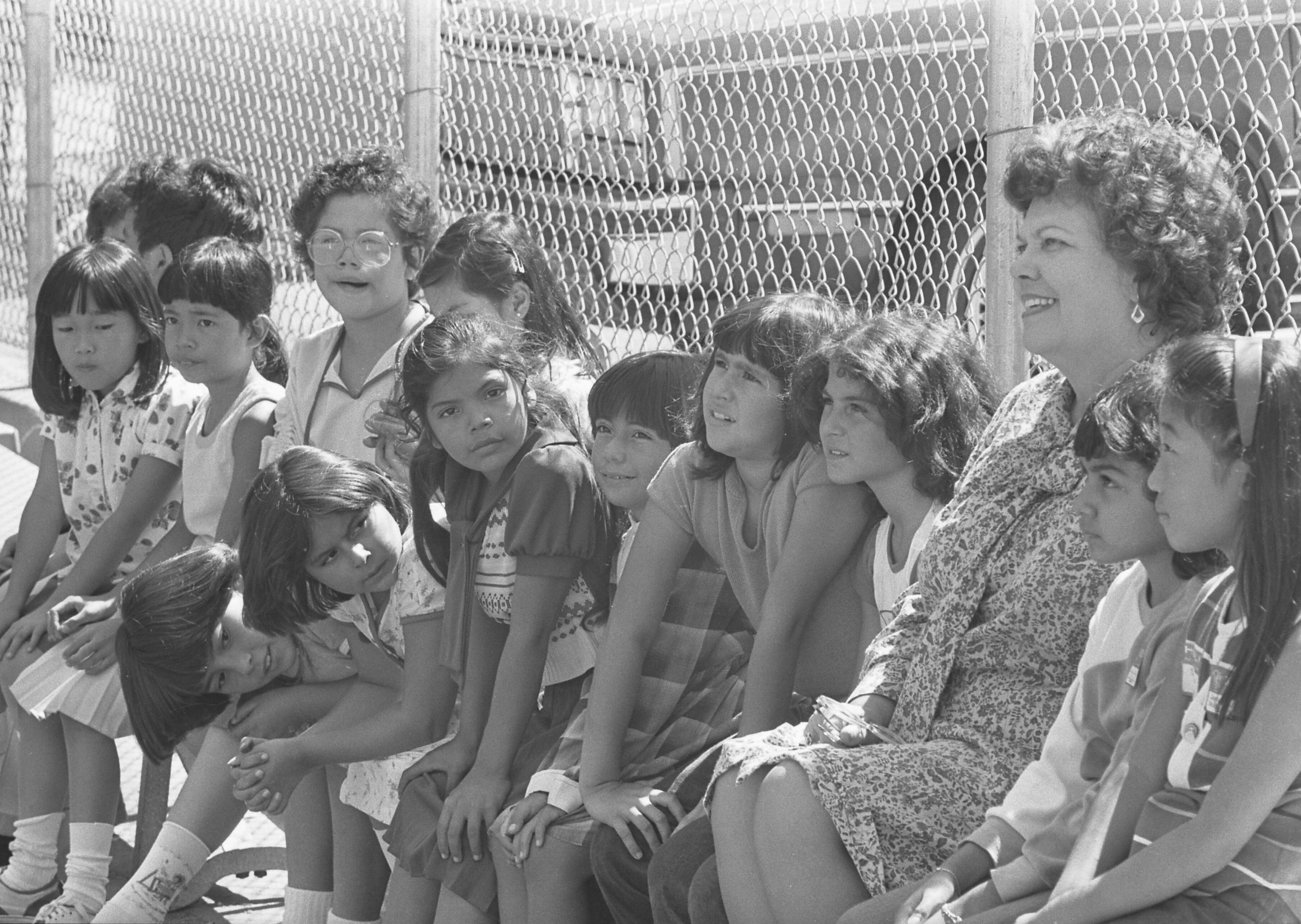
A school principal with a diverse group of students during school integration; 1980

In 1961, Jackson vs. Pasadena School District was a local predecessor of Crawford v. Board of Ed. Of Los Angeles. Jar R. Jackson and Lucia Jackson, noticed that the local Washington Junior High School zone in the district was separated between white and black students. They filed a lawsuit against the district spearheaded by attorney Samuel Sheats, the president of the National Association for the Advancement of Colored People (NAACP) in Pasadena. In 1963, at the Supreme Court of California, the Jacksons won through an appeal after the Pasadena Superior Court dismissed their complaint. The court ruled typically for the times, that school boards needed to refrain from intentional actions towards segregating students despite the reasons for it. However, what was different about this ruling is that it demanded an active integration of school that had a substantial racial difference. A setback to this ruling, as well as other rulings in Los Angeles City School District and surrounding areas, was the language used to ask for integration. The language implied that integration was required if it was “reasonably feasible.” This caveat was used by local school districts to claim integration was not feasible due to financial or other limitations.

In 1963, a lawsuit, Crawford v. Board of Ed. of Los Angeles was filed to end segregation in the district. The California Supreme Court required the district to come up with a plan in 1977. The board returned to court with what the court of appeal years later would describe as "one of if not the most drastic plan of mandatory student reassignment in the nation." A desegregation busing plan was developed to be implemented in the 1978 school year. Two lawsuits to stop the enforced busing plan, both titled Bustop, Inc. v. Los Angeles Bd. of Ed., were filed by the group Bustop Inc. and were petitioned to the United States Supreme Court. The petitions to stop the busing plan were subsequently denied by Justice Rehnquist and Justice Powell. California Constitutional Proposition 1, which mandated that busing follow the Equal Protection Clause of the U.S. Constitution passed in 1979 with 70% of the vote. The Crawford v. Board of Ed. of Los Angeles lawsuit was heard in the Supreme Court in 1982. The Supreme Court upheld the decision that Proposition 1 was constitutional.

After the Crawford v. Board of Ed. Of Los Angeles was processed in Los Angeles, and just as the outcome was upheld by the Supreme Court, Judge Paul Égly, created the Los Angeles Monitoring Committee (May 1978). Helen V. Smookler was the executive director of the committee and she managed 12 members from the community, ranging from all diverse backgrounds representative of the Los Angeles demographics. Each member spearheaded a sub-committee that was charged with overseeing and working on sustaining the desegregation of "all senior high schools, majority of junior highs, and most elementary schools." The committee's Integration project master plan (1979-1980) expanded beyond the Brown ruling because Los Angeles was a hub of multiculturalism. Hence, the “(1) logical and sensible, and (2) economical and inexpensive in time and effort and dollars” approach is to desegregate minority school pupils and integrate them into other schools. A goal of the integration process was to have small class sizes so that the diverse student population would have more individualized support when dealing with possible racial differences. By the mid-1980s the desegregation process was in compliance with the Supreme Court ruling and California propositions.

=== Attempts at reform (1990–2000) ===
Various attempts at program reform have been attempted. In one reform, individual schools were given more authority over day-to-day decisions and public school choice, authored by school board member Yolie Flores was implemented. In the 1990s, the Los Angeles Education Alliance for Restructuring Now (LEARN) and the Los Angeles Annenberg Metropolitan Project (LAAMP) were created, giving principals even more authority to make changes in curriculum hopefully benefiting students. Regardless, student achievement failed to increase.

Later attempted reform led to the creation of eleven minidistricts with decentralized management and their own individual superintendents. Due to the cost of this additional bureaucracy, then Superintendent Romer called for reversing the measure and re-merging the minidistricts. United Teachers Los Angeles, the union representing LAUSD teachers, supported this plan. Eight numbered Local Districts arose from the merger replacing the eleven districts.

From 1993 to 2000, LAUSD schools were required to continue year round schedules while 540 LAUSD schools had year-round schedules but were allowed to change them to traditional schedules. Due to community outcry, 539 of them reverted, especially those in the San Fernando Valley and Westside areas and several in the Harbor area.

=== Further reform and the COVID-19 pandemic (2000–present) ===
==== Assembly Bill 1381 ====
After his election to Mayor of Los Angeles, Antonio Villaraigosa advocated bringing control of the public school system under his office, removing power from the Board of Education. This sparked some protest from teachers, LAUSD board members and many residents of communities not within the City of Los Angeles but served by LAUSD.

In August 2006, after a compromise was brokered which allowed the mayor large control while retaining an elected school board and allowing input to be provided from surrounding cities, California State Assembly Bill 1381 passed, giving the mayor a measure of control over district administration. Governor Arnold Schwarzenegger signed the law on September 18, 2006. The board of education immediately filed suit to block the law, claiming that it violates the state constitution by allowing a local government to take over an educational agency.

AB 1381 was required to sunset on January 1, 2013, unless extended by the Legislature. On December 21, 2006, AB 1381 was ruled unconstitutional. The mayor appealed, but later dropped his appeal as two of the candidates he supported for school board were elected, essentially giving him indirect control over the school district.

==== Employee housing ====
Between 2009 and 2019, the district built three employee housing units in Los Angeles with federal tax credits:Norwood Learning Village, Selma Community Housing complex in Hollywood, and Sage Park Apartments on the northern end of the Gardena High School property in Harbor Gateway: the three together have 185 units. While the units were intended for teaching staff, the requirements of the tax credit-built complexes needing to house people making below certain salary targets made teachers ineligible for living in these complexes. Therefore, Norwood and Sage Park housed other district employees including assistants to teachers, bus drivers, and staff in student dining halls; these workers make up about 50% of the residents of Selma.

==== 2015 bombing hoax ====
On December 15, 2015, the district received an emailed threat, thought by some officials to be credible, causing the closure of all Los Angeles Unified Schools. It was later judged by Los Angeles police to have been a hoax. The email was traced to an IP address in Frankfurt, Germany. The Los Angeles Times reported that the threat did not necessarily originate from an IP address in Frankfurt, Germany. After the threat had been received at 10 p.m. the previous day, the decision to close the schools was made at 6 a.m. by Los Angeles Unified School District Superintendent Ramon C. Cortines. Cortines had quietly submitted his resignation just four days earlier, but stepped back into authority when the crisis emerged.

Los Angeles Mayor Eric Garcetti stated that because he does not control the schools, that Superintendent Ramon Cortines, not he, made the decision. People in charge concurred that their response could have been better organized. Cortines stated that he should have been contacted much less than 7 hours after receiving the threat. Though the school board president contacted police, Cortines was not contacted until they were unable to rule out a real attack, giving him minutes before school bus drivers left to make the important decision.

Former Los Angeles Police Chief and current New York Police Commissioner William Bratton referred to the closure as a significant overreaction. "We can not allow ourselves to raise levels of fear." He also suggested the incident could have been inspired by the TV series Homeland.

==== Hand sanitizer mismanaged funds ====
Due to the pandemic, many household necessities such as toilet paper and hand sanitizer were hard to get a hold of and had their prices skyrocket as supermarkets and business engaged in price gouging. Many parents helped LAUSD teachers by purchasing their own supplies including hand sanitizers, tissues, wet wipes, soap etc. LAUSD spent $3.2 million of taxpayer money to supply classrooms with hand sanitizer. $1.4 million worth of hand sanitizer went unused/expired and required an additional $1.4 million to be properly dumped. Taxpayers were upset that the district had essentially mismanaged funds leading to a cost of $2.8 million being wasted on hand sanitizer that was not used and needed to be dumped.

==== COVID-19 pandemic ====
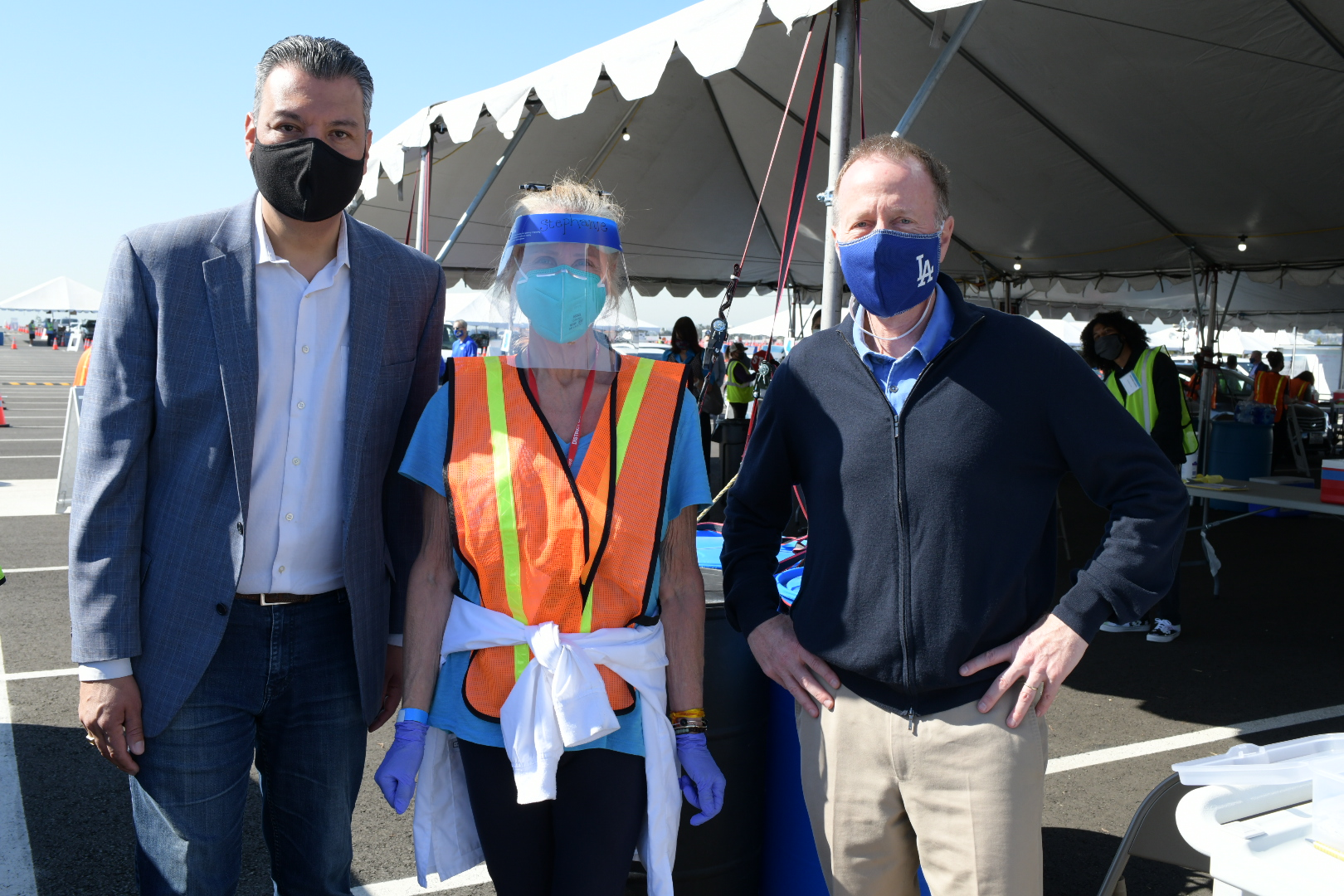
U.S. Senator Alex Padilla (left) and Superintendent Austin Beutner during a vaccination event in 2021

After the outbreak of COVID-19 in California in 2020, LAUSD closed its schools in order to combat the spread within the district, which was extended to May 1 as the virus grew worse. In August 2021, the District enacted a mandatory COVID-19 vaccination policy for staff, vendors, contractors, volunteers and affiliated charter schools. A similar policy was initially announced for students, enforcement of which was delayed until July 2023 prior to being dropped. In January 2022, the District announced that students would be returning to campus, requiring all students to have masks and be tested for COVID every week. On February 22, 2022, the Board announced that the LAUSD would drop the outdoor mask requirement after Los Angeles County relaxed masking rules earlier that week, but still keeping the indoor mask requirements. After Los Angeles County further relaxed masking rules in March, the District announced that they would not drop the indoor mask requirement, later reversing course later that month. A lawsuit challenging the District's COVID-19 vaccine mandate was brought in January 2023, and the policy was dropped in September 2023.

==== 2022 ransomware attack ====
On September 5, 2022, the LAUSD was hit by a ransomware attack. The attack, which occurred over the Labor Day weekend, disrupted "access to email, computer systems, and applications". An Instagram post from Northridge Academy High School confirmed that the attack prevented students and staff from accessing Google Drive and Schoology. Russian-speaking ransomware group Vice Society, known for its targeting of the educational sector, took responsibility for the attack.

Although the LAUSD slowly recovered from the attack, the district reportedly encountered difficulties regaining access to certain systems, and password resets initiated by the district proved to be cumbersome. Reports also emerged that the district was hit by a similar attack in February 2021, although to little success. The district also expedited its rollout of multi-factor authentication for staff members.

That month, the login credentials of at least 23 LAUSD staff members appeared on the dark web, with at least one set of credentials connected to the district's VPN service. However, an investigation into the credentials found that they were unrelated to the attack.

On October 2, stolen data related to the attack was released by Vice Society. The district had previously made statements that they were unwilling to pay the ransom, with superintendent Alberto Carvalho claiming that paying ransom "never guarantees the full recovery of data". Although the type of data was not disclosed by the LAUSD, credit monitoring services were provided to individuals whose personal information was put at risk as a result of the breach. An investigation into the attack, conducted by the Federal Bureau of Investigation, the White House, and the Cybersecurity and Infrastructure Security Agency is currently ongoing.

==== Anti-LGBTQ+ protests ====
Following the announcement of a planned reading of Mary Hoffman's "The Great Big Book of Families" at Saticoy Elementary School, in North Hollywood, a transgender teacher at the school discovered that a Pride flag had been burned.

In response to the anti-LGBTQ+ activity in both Los Angeles Unified School District and neighboring Glendale Unified School District, GALAS LGBTQ+ Armenian Society, glendaleOUT and Somos Familia Valle released a joint statement denouncing efforts by some parents to undermine LGBTQ+ content within school programming and curricula.

These actions culminated in a rally at Saticoy Elementary School, where anti-LGBTQ+ protesters used homophobic and antisemitic slurs and attacked an unhoused bystander.

== Labor relations ==
Historically, unions have long played an important role in the operation and governance of L.A. Schools. These include the United Teachers of Los Angeles, (UTLA) which currently represents over 35,000 teachers and the Associated Administrators of Los Angeles (AALA). The UTLA has sometimes authorized strikes against the LAUSD since its inception in 1970.

=== 1989 teachers strike ===
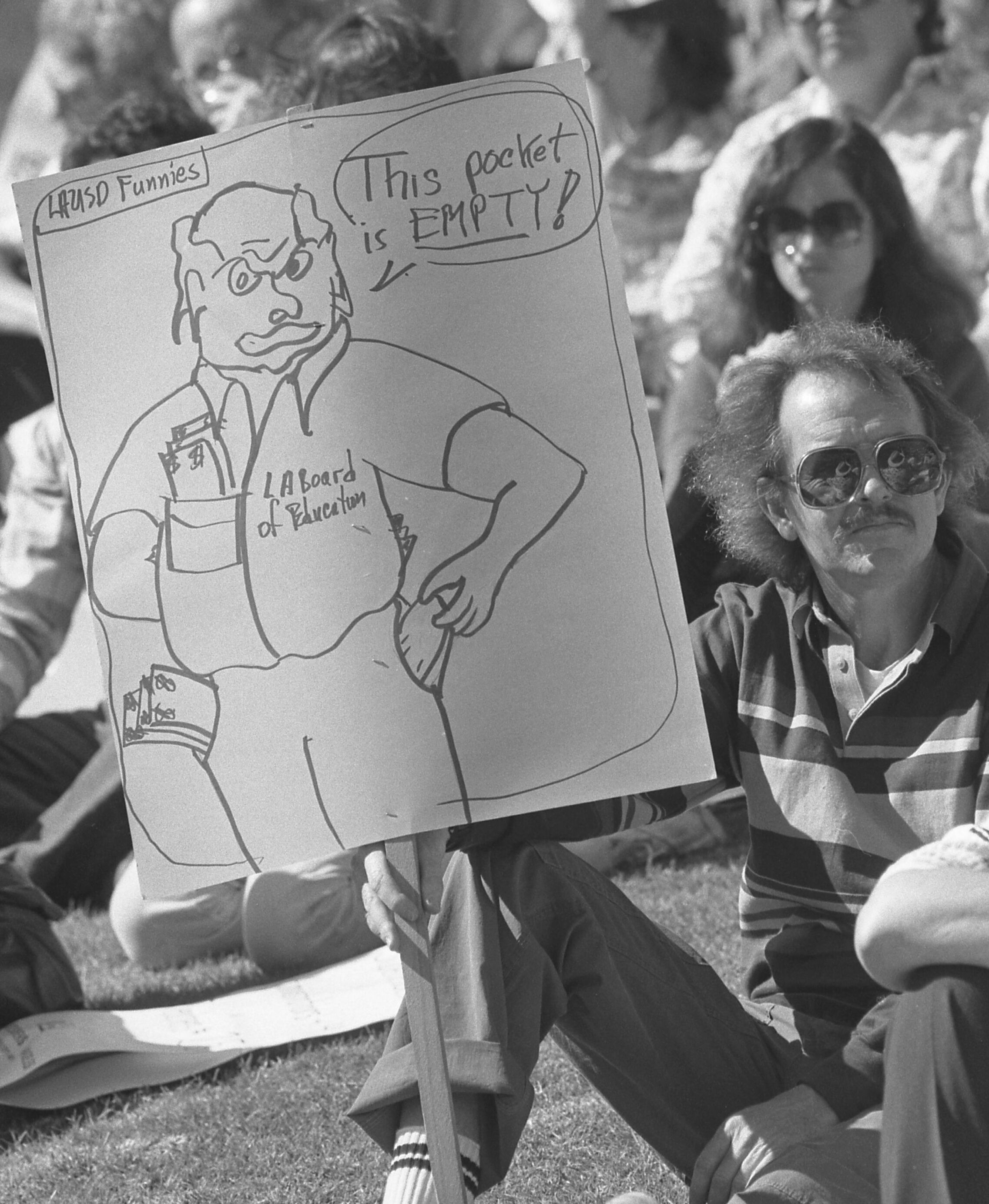
Man with cartoon protesting against the Board of Education; 1987

On May 30, 1989, approximately 20,000 UTLA members went out on strike for higher pay and more administrative control. The strike lasted nine days starting on May 30, 1989. The months preceding the strike were highly contentious. Numerous negotiation tactics were deployed by both sides including teacher demonstrations, threats to withhold grades, threats to dock teacher pay and many hard fought court battles. Union demands included pay increases and better school conditions. Thousands of substitute teachers were mobilized in preparation for the strike, and teachers prepared by saving money to endure a long walk-out. Many of the city's 600 schools reportedly remained open but with lower attendance. The district reported that 8,642 teachers crossed picket lines, and public rhetoric by both sides was critical and intense. After negotiations, a settlement was reached and a three-year contract produced. Both sides claimed victory. Despite successful teacher pay raises obtained in the settlement, a massive economic recession in 1990 caused negotiations in 1991 to focus on preventing massive layoffs due to hundreds of millions in budget deficits. Salaries were cut to avoid layoffs, ameliorating the positive results of the 1989 strike.

=== 2019 teachers strike ===
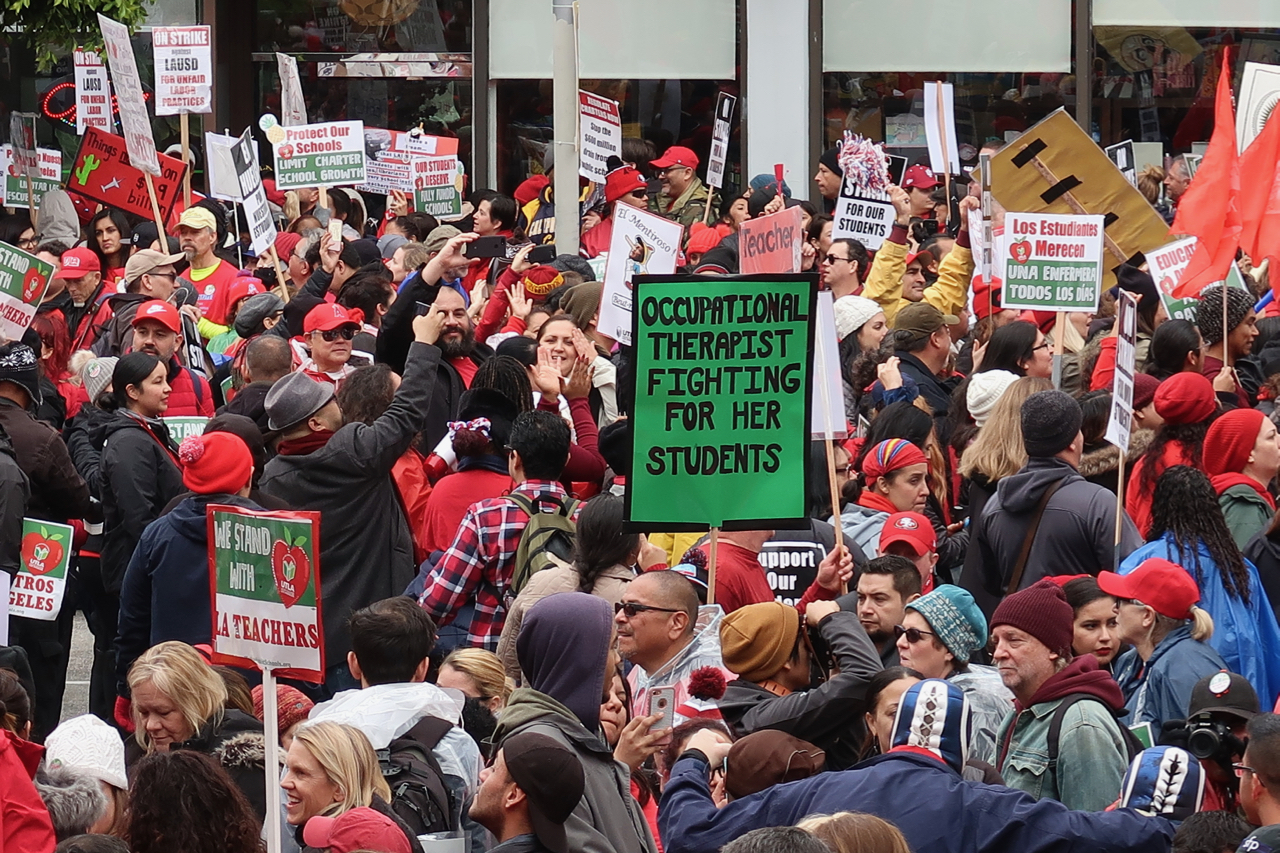
Teachers in Little Tokyo during the second day of the strike; 2019

On January 14, 2019, 30,000 teachers walked out in what was the first teacher's strike in Los Angeles since 1989. The strike lasted six days. Schools remained open, with replacement teachers and administrative staff filling in for the striking teachers, but school attendance was estimated to have dropped to less than half during the strike. Teachers and their supporters held rallies around the city, including at City Hall and LAUSD headquarters.

The UTLA and LAUSD reached a deal on January 22, 2019, after an all-night negotiating session. The agreement included a 6 percent pay raise for teachers, a reduction in class size by 4 students per class for grades four through 12 over the course of three years, the removal of a provision that had previously allowed larger class sizes during times of economic hardship, and a "commitment to provide a full-time nurse in every school" as well as a librarian for every middle and high school. The deal also included the establishment of 30 community schools around the district, modeled after similar programs in Cincinnati, Ohio, and Austin, Texas, seeking to provide students with social services and learning experiences in the arts. The deal contained no binding agreements on charter schools, but it did include a non-binding resolution calling on the state to establish a cap on charter schools.

=== 2023 classified staff strike ===
On March 21, 2023, Service Employees International Union, Local 99 (SEIU99) planned a three day strike against LAUSD demanding a 30% raise to which LAUSD had countered with a 23% raise plus a 3% cash bonus. Unified Teachers Los Angeles (UTLA) decided to join in on the strike as recent support in the last couple of years have been dwindling in an effort to support their upcoming labor negotiations. After the conclusion of the three-day strike, school resumed on March 24 with no new deal being agreed upon. In the afternoon of the same day, it was announced that LAUSD and SEIU99 agreed upon a "historic deal", meeting the demands that SEIU99 asked and more.

== Programs ==
=== Magnet programs ===
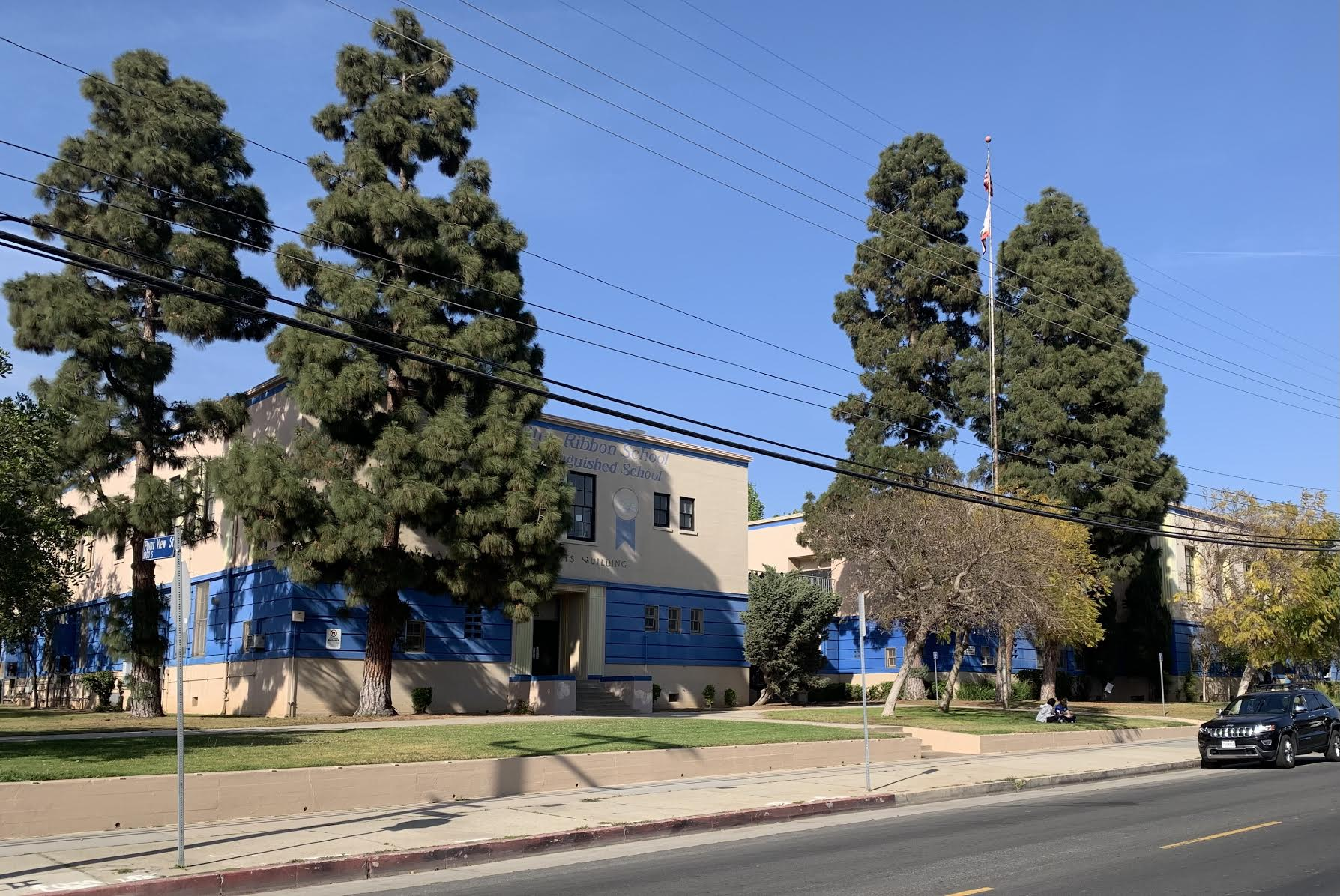
The Los Angeles Center for Enriched Studies, the first magnet school in LAUSD, which opened in 1977.

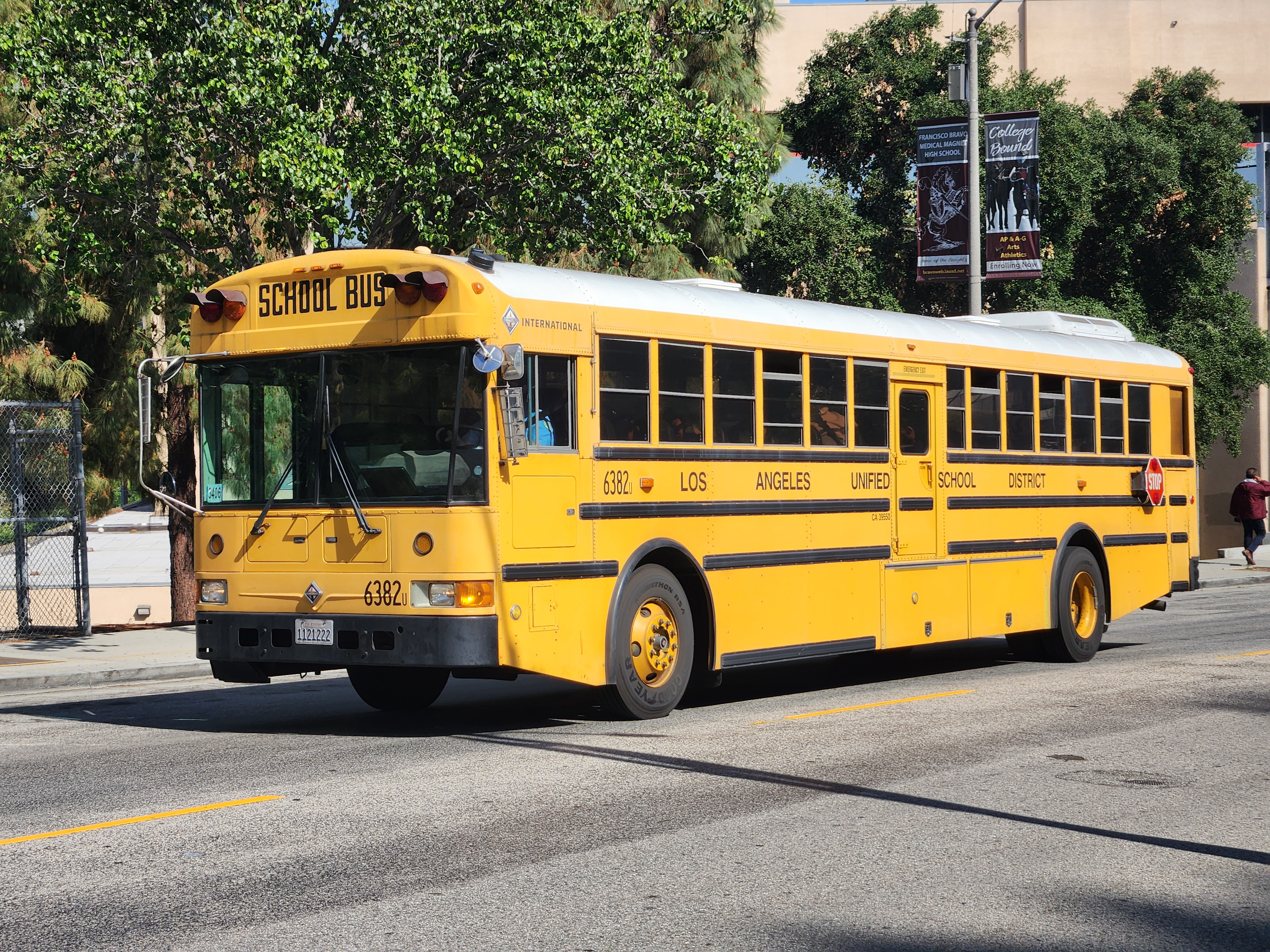
A school bus at the Francisco Bravo Medical Magnet High School, highlighting the magnet program's acceptance of students from many areas.

As of January 2014, LAUSD has 191 magnet schools with about 53,500 students. In 2012, the school district admitted 16,000 new students into these magnet schools out of a pool of 66,000 applications. Cara Mia DiMassa of the Los Angeles Times said that the schools, "designed to be among the best campuses in the district, mostly are as competitive for applicants as any popular private school."

LAUSD's magnet schools include gifted and highly gifted schools, as well as a large number of magnet programs focusing on students with specific interests, including multiple arts-related magnet programs, multiple science-related magnet programs, multiple pre-law magnet programs, and multiple pre-medical magnet programs. There are also dozens of specialty magnet programs for students with other specific interests.

The district assigns points to prospective applicants based on certain conditions: students who have applied for magnet schools before receive additional points, students who live in overcrowded zoned schools receive points, and students who live in mostly minority communities receive points. In addition, the magnet schools have racial quotas. Each school is to have 30–40% non-Hispanic White students and 60–70% minority students. As of 2011, within LAUSD, 90% of the overall student body consists of racial and ethnic minorities.

The magnet schools were established in 1977 as an alternative to forced desegregation busing. The racial quota system was devised at a time when the integration focus was on making Black and White students attend school together. Since then, the district demographics changed.

As of January 2005, of the Hispanic students in LAUSD, 1.2% attended magnet schools. Of the White students in LAUSD, 16% attended magnet schools. Of all magnet school students, 46.5% are Hispanic, 20% are White, 19.2% are Black, 10.2% are Asian, 3.6% are Filipino, and .6% are other. The overall LAUSD student body was 72.8% Hispanic, 11.6% Black, 9% White, 3.8% Asian, 2.2% Filipino, and .6% other.

=== Consultants ===
Although grappling with economic shortfalls, the Los Angeles Unified School District continues to employ consultants. In 2008, the district employed more than 800 consultants – paid, on average, more than twice as much as regular employees – to oversee school construction. The Facilities Services Division spends about $182 million on its 849 consultants, almost $215,000 each. The division's regular employees are paid about $99,000 each. At the time, Senior Deputy Superintendent Ramon Cortines said that consultants may get the work done quickly and correctly, but said he is also concerned about the district's reliance on outside workers. "We need to look at it, to reduce the number of consultants," he said. In the seven main branches of the Facilities Services Division, there are 3,479 district employees who earn a total of about $347 million, according to district records. The division employs 849 consultants who earn a total of about $182.6 million. The practice has prompted concerns and a growing number of inquiries from the district's board members and LAUSD's bond oversight committee. Some district officials defend the practice, saying use of consultants ebbs and flows with the various stages of construction.

Efforts to reform the Facilities Services Division by Superintendent Ramon Cortines, from 2009 to 2010, has continued to result in union complaints and audit issues regarding consultants. Former Chief of Facilities James Sohn, hired on 2009, led the effort to reduce consultant payments by 20% and increase consultant company competition. However, this effort has been ridiculed by audits from Los Angeles County Controller Wendy Greuel and confidential internal audits by the Office of Inspector General in LAUSD that consistently found lax oversight and conflicts of interest. The confidential report by the OIG office, prompted by whistleblowers, found “irregularities in $65 million worth of contracts.” This includes costs that exceed pre-approved amounts by 50% and contracts worth $31 million without school board approval. James Sohn's declaration to decrease 20% consultants costs were also shown to be disingenuous by the OIG audit report, which found many consultants switched companies with a higher billing rate, offsetting the 20% reduction and companies increased hourly billing rate prior to the 20% reduction, therefore negating any difference. James Sohn disputes these charges.

James Sohn has also introduced a new contract type, called Agency Construction Manager (Agency CM) which claim to offer many benefits, including maximizing consultant services, lower costs, increase productivity and increase small business competition (see Construction Management). Agency CM is an attempt to replace the old consultant model of billing for an hourly rate in favor of a “lump sum task order”. Task orders are designed to provide payment for completion of a particular task, regardless of the number of hours worked. Criticisms with this include the lack of adequate tracking of consultant employees. Comparing district to consultant staffing would not be accurate. These contracts were also cited in the confidential OIG report as “vague” in detail. Teamster union officials have also complained about layoffs within Facilities that have resulted in massive district demotions and layoffs. Teamster representative, Connie Oser, has alleged that district staff have been removed while consultant contracts have been continuously and repeatedly approved by the board, consultant employees shuffled between companies, and the use of Agency CM, which enables tracking of consultants, difficult. Superintendent Ramon Cortines and former Chief Facilities Sohn have both claimed consultants have been reduced in far greater numbers than district staff. This claim cannot be verified since the use of Agency CM contracts.

Allegations have also surfaced against James Sohn's management staff. Many of his Executive level staff have been prior consultants. James Sohn has also been criticized for his attempt to purge all non-legally required documents in each employee computer system. After Teamsters union complaints, LAUSD halted this practice. James Sohn claimed this is a customary process done by construction programs. He did not provide any evidence to support this claim.

=== United States Academic Decathlon ===
Various schools in the District have participated in the United States Academic Decathlon, with some schools winning the United States Academic Decathlon National Championship. These include:

- John Marshall High School: 1987, 1995
- William H. Taft High School: 1989, 1994, 2006
- El Camino Real High School: 1998, 2001, 2004, 2005, 2007, 2010, 2014, 2018, 2023
- Granada Hills Charter High School: 2011, 2012, 2013, 2015, 2016, 2017, 2019

=== All District High School Honor Band ===
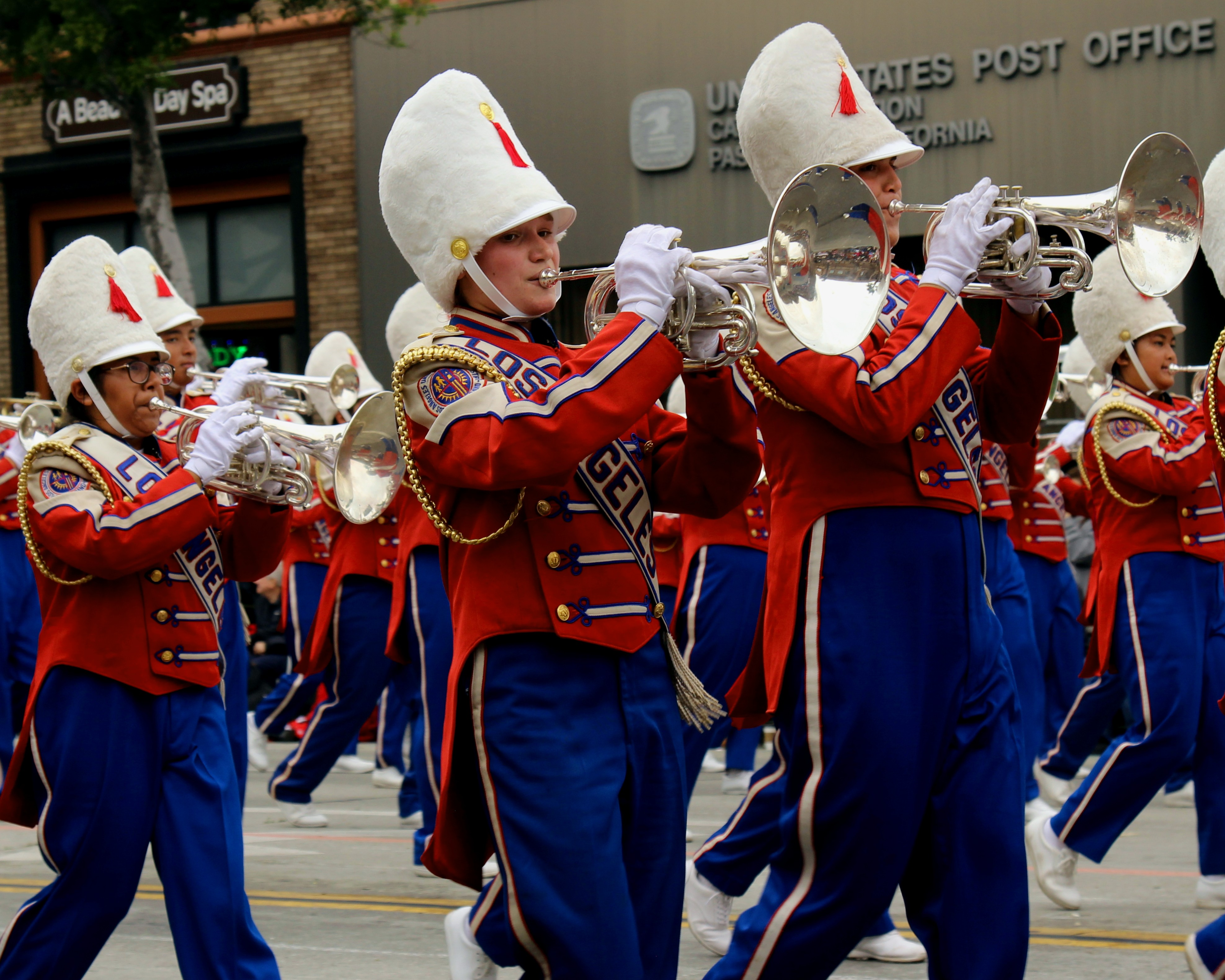
The All District High School Honor Band at the 2017 Rose Parade.

The All District High School Honor Band members are invited in September each year to audition for the band, which includes only brass and percussion instruments. The group has marched in every Tournament of Roses Parade since 1973. The All District High School Band allows members the opportunity to perform in Bandfest, at Disneyland, and on other events. The 300 members are required "to maintain a 2.5 or greater grade point average, and stay in good standing with home school program."

Originally organized to meet the minimum requirement of having 100 members on the band to perform in the Rose Parade, the Honor Band has performed at Anaheim Stadium, Hollywood Bowl, Hollywood Christmas Lane Parade, Los Angeles Memorial Coliseum, Rams and Raiders football games, and Super Bowls XI, XIV, and XVII. They were present at the Governor's Inauguration in Sacramento, XXIV Olympiad Salute, and the World Series during the past 25 years. In May 1986 the band traveled to Atlanta to participate in Coca-Cola's Centennial Celebration, and at the end of the month, participated in Hands Across America where the band was the "anchor" at the event's Western terminus at the RMS Queen Mary pier in Long Beach, California. The band's current director Anthony "Tony" White has been directing the band for 30 years.

== Incidents and concerns ==
=== Crimes and lawsuits ===
On January 5, 2008, Sandy Banks of the Los Angeles Times reported that vandals and thieves targeted LAUSD schools in various neighborhoods during holidays. Banks said that the lack of police presence allows thieves to target schools.

Thirty-three-year-old Alberto Gutierrez sued the Los Angeles Unified School District, saying that the principal of the San Fernando High School, where he was assigned, retaliated against him when Gutierrez asked students to "think critically" about the role of the United States in the Iraq War. Jose Luis Rodriguez, the principal, says that he spoke to Gutierrez because some parents did not appreciate Gutierrez requiring students to attend off-campus screenings of Fahrenheit 9/11 and Crash.

On January 31, 2012, police arrested Mark Berndt, a veteran teacher at Miramonte Elementary School, and charged him with 23 counts of lewd conduct, which included taking pictures of students who were being spoon-fed his semen. Another teacher, Martin Springer, was charged with fondling a 7-year-old girl in his class. A third teacher, a female, was accused of "aiding and abetting" Mark Berndt by sending him victims. The entire staff at Miramonte was subsequently replaced.

That same year, on December 18, 2012, a jury awarded a $23 million settlement to a 14-year-old boy who had been molested repeatedly by his fifth grade teacher at Queen Anne Place Elementary School in the Mid-Wilshire area, one of the largest awards in the history of the school system. Forest Stobbe, a long time veteran teacher of Queen Place Elementary pleaded no contest to two counts of lewd acts on a child and repeated sexual abuse of a child under the age of 14 and was sentenced to 16 years in prison. The boy in question was 10 at the time of the abuse. At the time of trial, the boy's attorney, Stephen Estey, asked for a $25 million verdict citing the school district's history of negligence, ignoring, "a number of red flags and complaints by other victims and as a result Stobbe grew bolder and inflicted a lifetime of harm on our defenseless client." Although Stobbe had no official criminal record, the Jury ruled that the school district, "should have heeded complaints that preceded the molestation." A previous female student complained Stobbe fondled her buttocks, and two years prior to his arrest Stobbe had been seen with a female student alone in his car. Among the insurmountable evidence against Stobbe was a jar of petroleum jelly on his desk that tested positive for the boy's DNA. The Los Angeles Unified School District was found 30% liable for the damages, and was responsible for $6.9 million of the final settlement.

On October 2, 2018, Rene Tenas pled no contest to two felony counts of lewd acts upon a child and was sentenced to five years in prison. A plea deal was made by Tenas’s defense attorney in which Tenas accepted responsibility while offering victims the opportunity to avoid testifying in person at court for a reduced sentence. Tenas taught fourth grade at Hart Street Elementary school, where he sexually abused seven students; such accused acts include “unzipping one girl’s bra, touching another girl ‘under her panties and bra’ and tickling and kissing her feet, and touching the other students inappropriately.” The Los Angeles Unified School District was accused of being aware of Tenas’s history of sexual abuse and agreed to pay $14.7 million as part of the settlement.

=== iPad distribution ===
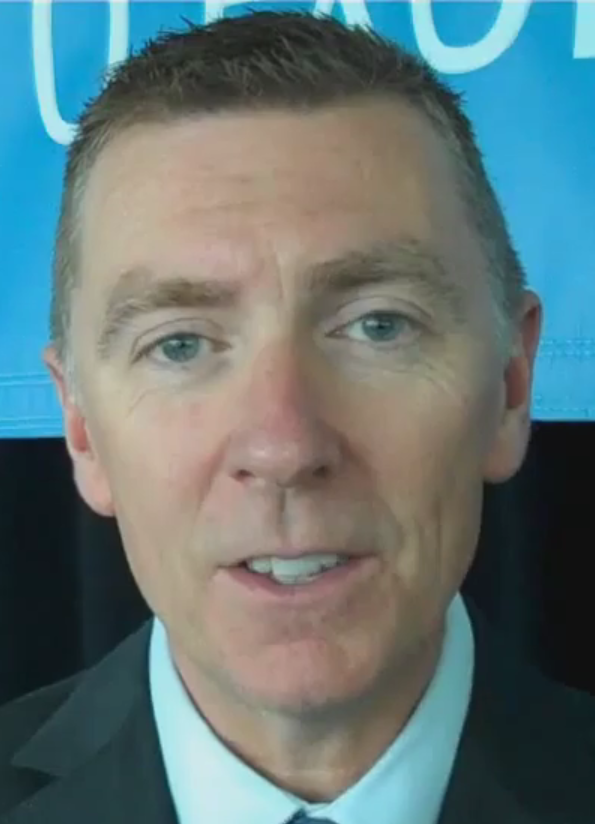
Superintendent John Deasy, who initiated the iPad program and later resigned in 2014.

In 2013, then-Superintendent John Deasy announce that he would be embarking on a project to give iPads to all students in within the District. He was met with criticisms about how they were more expensive than other tablets from other manufacturers. That same year, his contract with LAUSD was extended to 2016. He also introduced the My Integrated Student Information System (MISiS), which was criticized for randomly disappearing grades and assignments.

In 2014, it was revealed that Deasy had ties to Apple Inc., the makers of the iPad, and Pearson PLC, creators of applications on the iPads, raising questions about the bidding process. Deasy resigned on October 16, 2014, after mounting criticisms and the failed iPad program. He remained in the district with a special assignment until the end of the year and received about 60 days pay, which totaled to $60,000. Cortines was picked to become superintendent again in an interim capacity. After Deasy's resignation, there was speculation about who would replace him as an official superintendent, but it was decided that, after Cortines, deputy superintendent Michelle King would become superintendent. In December 2014, the Federal Bureau of Investigation seized records from LAUSD pertaining to the iPad program.

Because of the failed program, Deasy resigned on October 15, 2014. In 2015, the board of education stated it was exploring possible litigation against Apple.

=== Criticism of teacher training workshop ===
In 2017, the non-profit The Israel Group submitted a complaint to the LAUSD regarding a workshop, “Learning About Islam and the Arab World,” that the United States branch of the Fellowship for Reconciliation (FORUSA) presented for teachers. FORUSA actively promotes the Boycott, Divestment and Sanctions (BDS) movement, a perspective shaping its efforts to influence educators about the Middle East. One attendee of the workshop told the Jewish Journal, "We are being told that the Palestinians are the victims and the Jews are the oppressors, categorically and totally... And we are being told that Hamas is not a terrorist group; Hamas is a noble entity defending the rights of Palestinians.” In a news release from the Simon Wiesenthal Center, the human rights organization further noted that "FORUS is closely aligned with CAIR, a US-based organization that has been linked to Hamas terrorist group."

Following greater public awareness of the workshop — the Anti-Defamation League (ADL) also spoke out, saying the workshop materials featured "substantial misrepresentations and distortions of established historical facts, omissions of relevant facts, and inflammatory language" – Democratic Congressman Brad Sherman contacted LAUSD. After reviewing the workshop's handouts, Sherman wrote, “[The Workshop] material is not just false, but is anti-Semitic and should have raised immediate red flags with LAUSD… I am concerned that LAUSD would promote an education program on the Middle East established by the Fellowship of Reconciliation (FORUSA), an organization who openly supports Boycott, Divestment, and Sanctions (BDS), a highly polarizing movement that singles out Israel, the only democracy in the Middle East, and has led to anti-Semitic hostility. The BDS movement is adverse to the foreign policy of the United States.”

=== Ed chatbot ===
On March 20, 2024, LAUSD launched Ed, a chatbot developed by the district and AllHere Education as part of the district's Individual Acceleration Plan to aid academic recovery from the COVID-19 pandemic and enhance student performance. After AllHere Education faced financial troubles and furloughed its staff on June 14, 2024, the district ceased operations of the chatbot.

== Governance ==
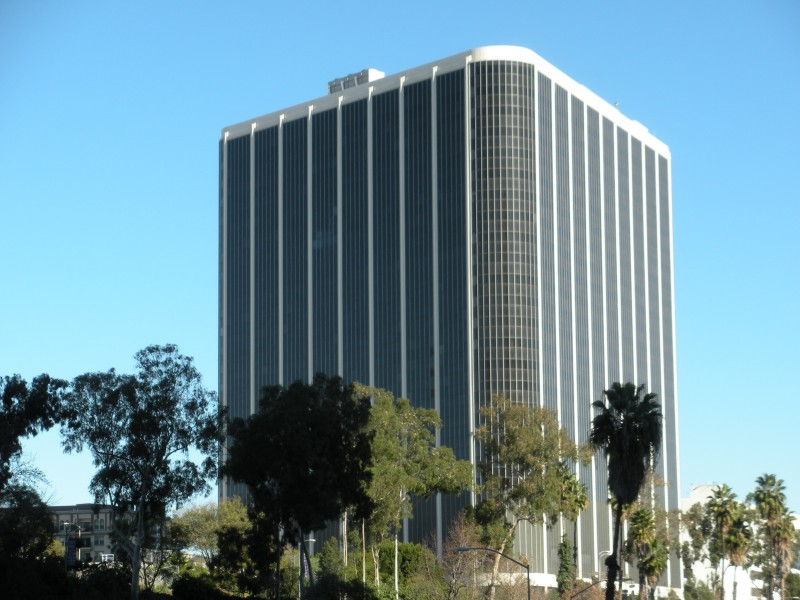
LAUSD headquarters, Beaudry Center, 333 S. Beaudry Street, Central City West, Los Angeles

Los Angeles Unified School District is governed by a seven-member Board of Education (BOE), which appoints a superintendent, who runs the daily operations of the district. Members of the board are elected directly by voters from separate districts that encompass communities that the LAUSD serves. On December 9, 2021 Alberto M. Carvalho has accepted to be the next permanent superintendent. He is preceded by interim superintendent Megan K. Reilly after Austin Beutner's resignation.

In the March 2015 Los Angeles City Council and School Board elections, voters approved Charter Amendment 2, which allowed the Los Angeles Unified School District Board of Education to change their election dates to even-numbered years. It took effect with the March 2020 primary election and the runoff in November 2020.

Every LAUSD household or residential area is zoned to an elementary school, a middle school and a high school, in one of the six local school districts. Each local school district is run by an area superintendent and is headquartered within the district.

=== Members ===
Leaders

Position	Name	Since
Superintendent	Andrés E. Chait	2022
Board President	Scott Schmerelson	2024
Board Vice President	Rocío Rivas	2024

Current members

District	Name	Since
1	Sherlett Hendy Newbill	2024
2	Rocío Rivas	2022
3	Scott Schmerelson	2013
4	Nick Melvoin	2017
5	Karla Griego	2024
6	Kelly Gonez	2017
7	Tanya Ortiz Franklin	2020

== Areas served ==
LAUSD serves the majority of Los Angeles (including some Beverly Hills addresses and excluding a portion of West Hills as well as a few others.

LAUSD serves all of the following communities:

- Bell
- Cudahy
- Florence
- Gardena
- Huntington Park
- Lomita
- Marina del Rey
- Maywood
- San Fernando
- Topanga
- Universal City
- Vernon
- View Park
- Walnut Park
- West Athens
- Westmont
- West Hollywood

and portions of the following communities:

- Carson
- Commerce (alongside Montebello Unified School District)
- East Los Angeles (alongside Montebello Unified School District)
- Hawthorne
- Inglewood (alongside Inglewood Unified School District)
- Monterey Park (alongside Alhambra Unified School District, Garvey School District, and Montebello Unified School District
- Rancho Palos Verdes (alongside Palos Verdes Peninsula Unified School District)
- South Gate (alongside Paramount Unified School District)
- West Compton (alongside Compton Unified School District)
- Willowbrook (alongside Compton Unified School District)

== Schools and properties ==
LAUSD has 219 year-round schools and 439 schools on the traditional calendar. In 2005, 47% of all LAUSD students were enrolled in year-round schools, but that has declined with construction of new schools and reduced enrollment as a result of the economic recession, such that in the 2012–13 school year, only three schools were on a year-round schedule.

=== Controversies ===
==== Edward R. Roybal Learning Center ====
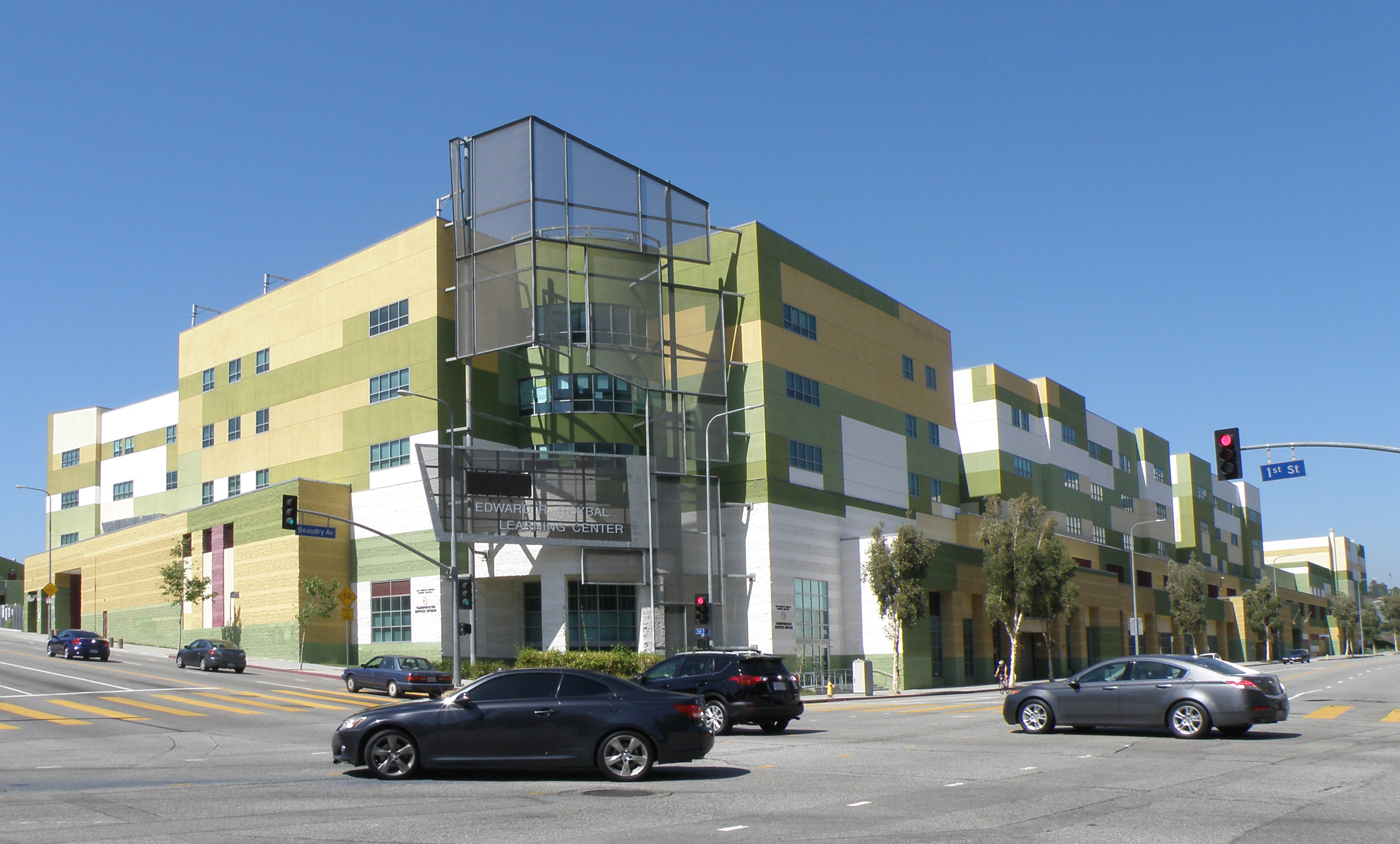
The Edward R. Roybal Learning Center near Downtown Los Angeles in 2016.

The Edward R. Roybal Learning Center (previously known as Belmont Learning Center or Vista Hermosa Learning Center), in the densely populated Westlake district just west of downtown, was originally envisioned as a mixed-use education and retail complex to include several schools, shops and a public park. After more than a decade of delays stemming from the environmental review process, ground was broken for construction in 1995. Midway through construction, it was discovered that explosive methane and toxic hydrogen sulfide were seeping from an old underground oil field. Later, an active surface fault was found under one of the completed buildings, necessitating its removal. LAUSD had spent an estimated $175 million on the project by 2004, with an additional $110 million budgeted for cleanup efforts. The total cost is estimated by LAUSD at $300 million. Critics have speculated that it may end up costing closer to $500 million. Designed by architectural firm DLR Group WWCOT, the school opened in 2008 as the "Edward R. Roybal Learning Center".

==== Ambassador Hotel ====
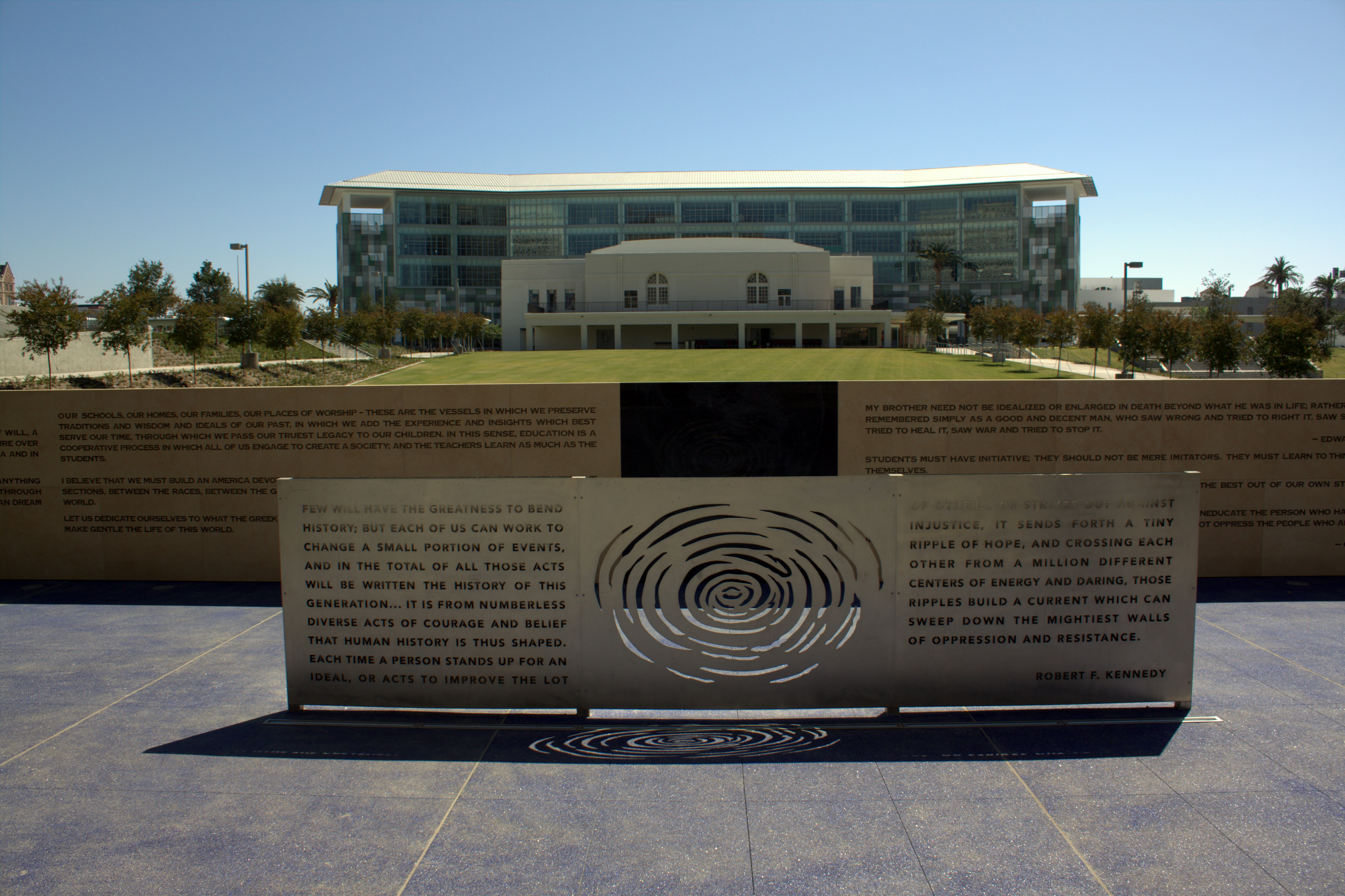
The Robert F. Kennedy Community Schools in Koreatown in 2010.

Another controversial project has been the development of the Ambassador Hotel property on Wilshire Boulevard in densely populated Koreatown. The LAUSD fought over the landmark with, among others, Donald Trump (with the legal battle dating back to 1989). In 2001, the LAUSD finally obtained legal ownership of the property. Plans to demolish the building, the site where Senator Robert F. Kennedy was shot, were met with strong opposition from preservationists. In August 2005, LAUSD settled a lawsuit over the matter that had been filed by numerous preservationist groups: most of the Ambassador complex would be destroyed, but the Paul Williams-designed coffee shop and the Cocoanut Grove nightclub would be preserved, with the Grove serving as the auditorium for a new school to be built on the site. Demolition began in late 2005 and the last section of the hotel fell on January 16, 2006.

The project construction became the most expensive school in the United States. It has three elementary schools, three middle schools, and four high schools including LAHSA. The Robert F. Kennedy Community Schools opened in September 2010 at the cost of $578 million to serve 4,200 K-12 students. Costs in 2010 were $350 per 1 square foot (0.093 m^{2}). Amidst great controversy the district attributed the high costs to material, land prices, seismic code, and unionized labor.

== Demographics ==
Historical population
Year	Student Enrollment	Percent change
1993	639,129	—
2000	721,346	+12.9%
2010	667,251	−7.5%
2020	574,996	−13.8%

As of the 2011–2012 school year, in its enrollment breakdown by ethnic group, 72.3% of its students were of Hispanic origin, of any race; 10.1% of the student population was of Non-Hispanic white ancestry; 9.6% of its students were African American, while Asian American students comprised 6%, including 2% of students of Filipino origin, and Native Americans and Pacific Islanders together comprised less than 1%. Black students were six times more likely to be arrested or given a ticket than white students, which contributed to the decision in 2014 to decriminalise school discipline so that minor offences would be referred to school staff rather than prosecuted.

== Notable people ==
=== Notable board of education members ===
- Chauncey Fitch Skilling (1868–1945), architect and former member of the City Council for the 2nd Ward; served on the Board from 1900 to 1902
- Percy V. Hammon (1873–1958), former member of the California State Assembly and member of the City Council for the 2nd Ward; served on the Board from 1902 to 1904
- Fay Allen (1887–1974), music teacher and first African-American woman to be elected to the Board; served on the Board from 1939 to 1943
- Diane Watson (born 1933), former U.S. Representative for the 21st district (2001–2011); served on the Board from 1975 to 1978
- Bobbi Fiedler (1937–2019), U.S. Representative for the 21st district (1981–1987); served on the Board from 1977 to 1980
- Kathleen Brown (born 1945), 29th Treasurer of California (1991–1995); served on the Board from 1975 to 1983
- Rita Walters (1930–2020), former member of the City Council for the 9th district (1991–2001); served on the Board from 1979 to 1991
- Warren Furutani (born 1947), former member of the California State Assembly (2008–2012); served in the Board from 1987 to 1995
- Leticia Quezada (born 1953), former Mexican Cultural Institute of Los Angeles (1995–2002); served on the Board from 1987 to 1992
- Vickie Castro (born 1946), former principal of Hollenbeck Junior High School; served on the Board from 1993 to 2001
- José Huizar (born 1968), former member of the City Council for the 14th district (2005–2020); served on the Board from 2001 to 2005
- Nury Martinez (born 1973), President (2020–2022) and member of the City Council for the 6th district (2013–2022); served on the Board from 2009 to 2013
- Ref Rodriguez (born 1972), adjunct professor and convicted felon; served on the Board from 2015 to 2018

=== Notable teachers ===
- Jim Tunney (born 1929), former American football official in the National Football League; taught in the district from 1951 to 1977
- Jaime Escalante (1930–2010), Bolivian-American educator portrayed by Edward James Olmos in the film Stand and Deliver; taught in the district from 1974 to 1991
- Ezola Foster (1938–2018), conservative African-American political activist; taught in the district from 1960 to 1998.
- Essie Mae Washington-Williams (1925–2013), daughter of Strom Thurmond; taught in the district from 1967 to 1997
- Migdia Chinea Varela, Cuban-American screenwriter; taught in the district from
- Scott Perry (born 1954), former American football defensive back in the National Football League for the Cincinnati Bengals; taught in the district from 1994 to at least 2007

== Infrastructure ==
=== Air quality monitoring ===
The district has the country's largest school-based air quality monitoring network. The sensors give parents and students up-to-date access to air quality information. The district can also identify trends in specific areas and use that information to provide air filtration systems to schools affected by consistently bad air quality.

== See also ==
- Highly Gifted Magnet
- List of high schools in Los Angeles County, California
- List of Los Angeles Unified School District schools
- List of Los Angeles Unified School District people
- Common Bonds
