= Bustop, Inc. v. Los Angeles Bd. of Ed. =

Court case in the United States of America

Bustop, Inc. v. Los Angeles Bd. of Ed. was the name shared by two separate challenges to the desegregation plan in Los Angeles, California, ruled on in 1977 and 1978. The plaintiff, Bustop, Inc., sued the Los Angeles Board of Education over its policy of desegregation busing of students in order to fulfill the desegregation ordered by the California Supreme Court. The plaintiff argued that the school district had ignored, "the federal rights of its citizens to be free from racial quotas and to be free from extensive pupil transportation that destroys fundamental rights of liberty and privacy." The District argued that it had acted in accordance with its court-ordered and approved plan to desegregate the district. In the 1977 case the court ruled in favor of the plaintiff. However, in the 1978 case, the court ruled in favor of the Board of Education.
