= Common Bonds =

- Directed by: Antonio Manriquez
- Written by: Kate McKinney; Antonio Manriquez; Aaron Wallace; Brendan Wolfe
- Produced by: Josh Gray-Emmer; Dan Aeberhard; Raina Roessle; Evelyn Seubert; James Gleason III
- Starring: Kate McKinney; Charles Rome Smith; Ike Gingrich
- Cinematography: Karen Chow-Del Rio
- Edited by: Elizabeth Eiben
- Music by: Michael W. Katz
- Distributed by: wam!/encore
- Release date: February 10, 1997
- Running time: 80 minutes
- Country: United States
- Language: English

Common Bonds is a 1997 American independent feature film directed by Antonio Manriquez. The movie's crew was composed of 40 teenagers from all over Los Angeles. Work on the movie began at Pacoima Middle School and took place over a two-year period. Film rights were sold to Encore Media and the film was later given a special screening at the Sundance Film Festival.

== Plot ==
Common Bonds tells the story of K.C., a rebellious teenage girl serving time in community service at a senior citizens’ home. Though at first K.C. is distant and defiant, she gradually is pulled into the lives of the seniors. Together with Norman, an irrepressible septuagenarian, she exposes and thwarts a con man who preys on the unsuspecting residents. In the process Norman and K.C.’s lives are changed through their discovery of the common bonds of understanding and support that tie both generations together.

== Cast ==
- Kate McKinney as K.C.
- Glenn Dickerson as Sheldon
- Polly Hunt as Scooter
- Charles Rome Smith as Norman

== Reception ==
The Daily News of Los Angeles gave a positive review for Common Bonds, saying it "[dazzled] moviegoers" with the film's innovation.
