= List of Los Angeles Unified School District people =

This is a list of notable alumni, faculty and current students of the American Los Angeles Unified School District, located in Los Angeles, California.

== Notable alumni ==
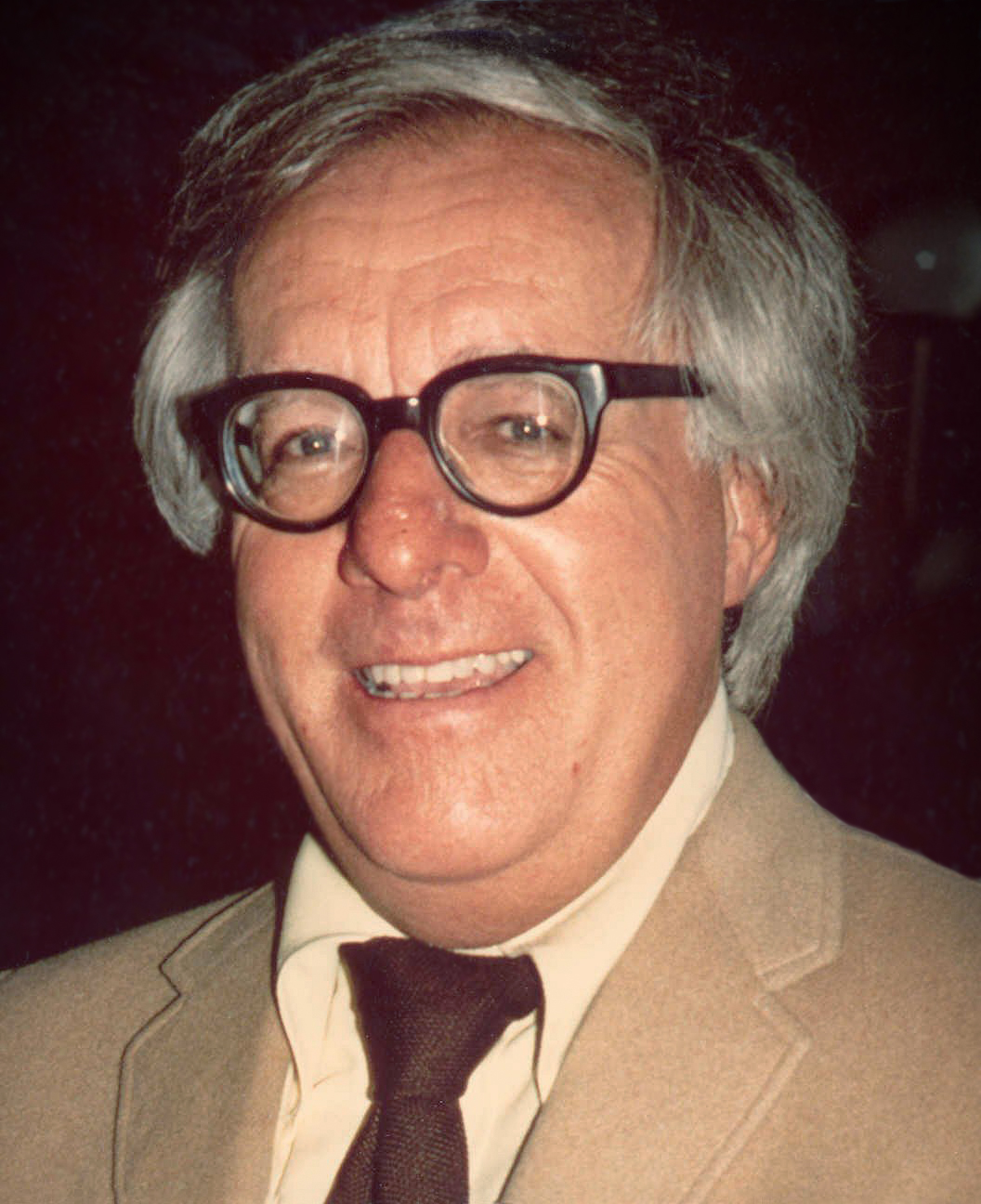
Ray Bradbury, Los Angeles High School alumnus

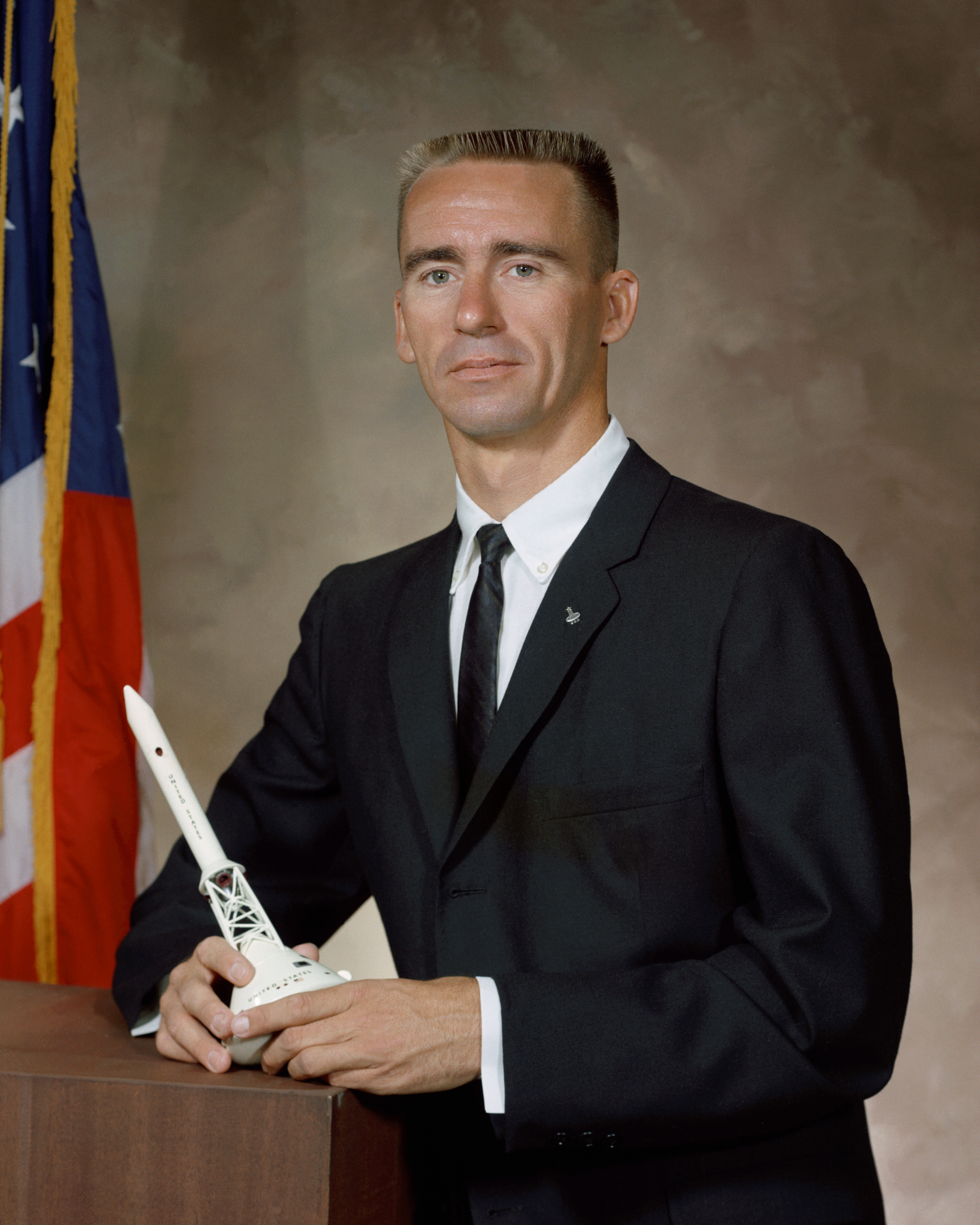
Walt Cunningham, Venice High School alumnus

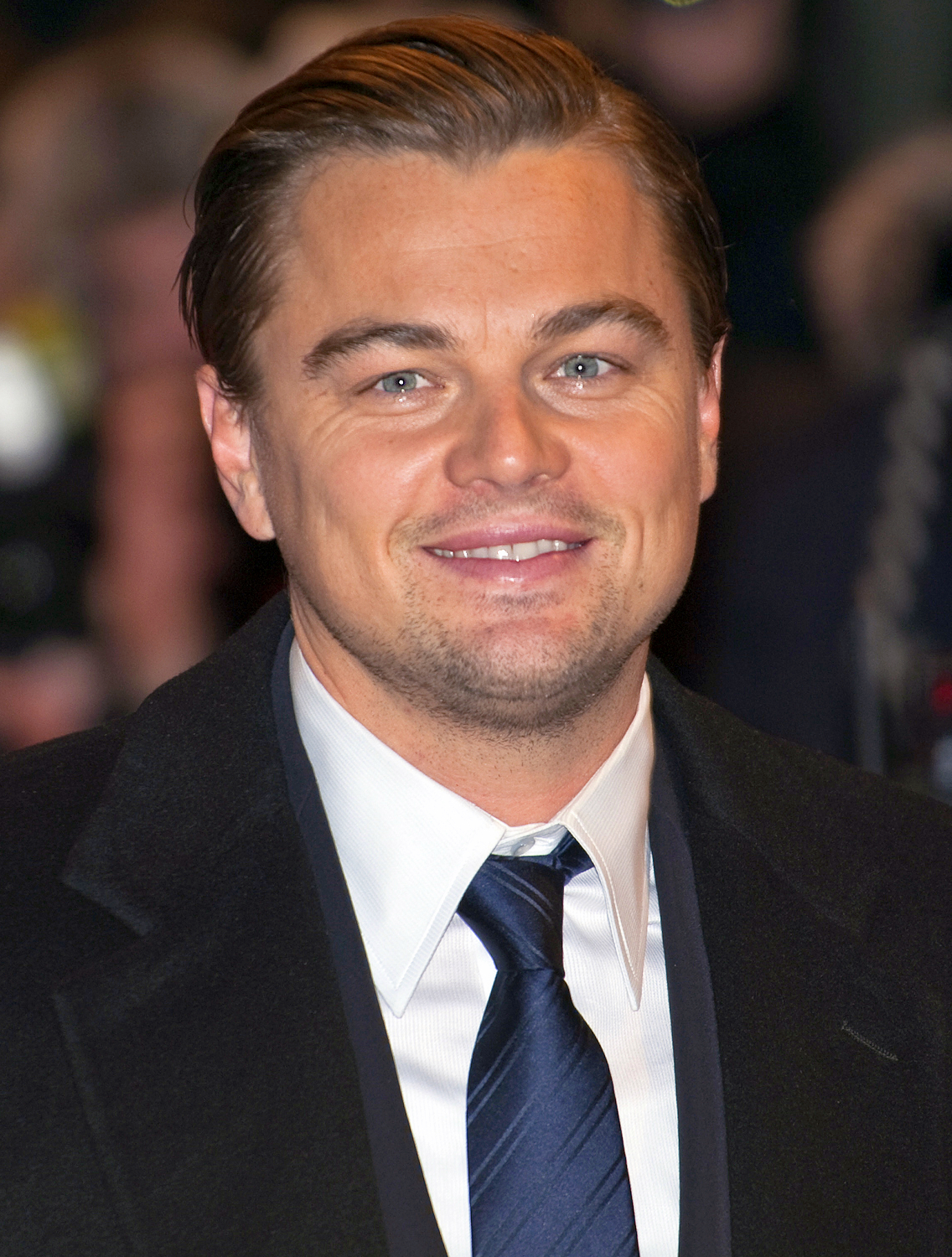
Leonardo DiCaprio, John Marshall High School alumnus

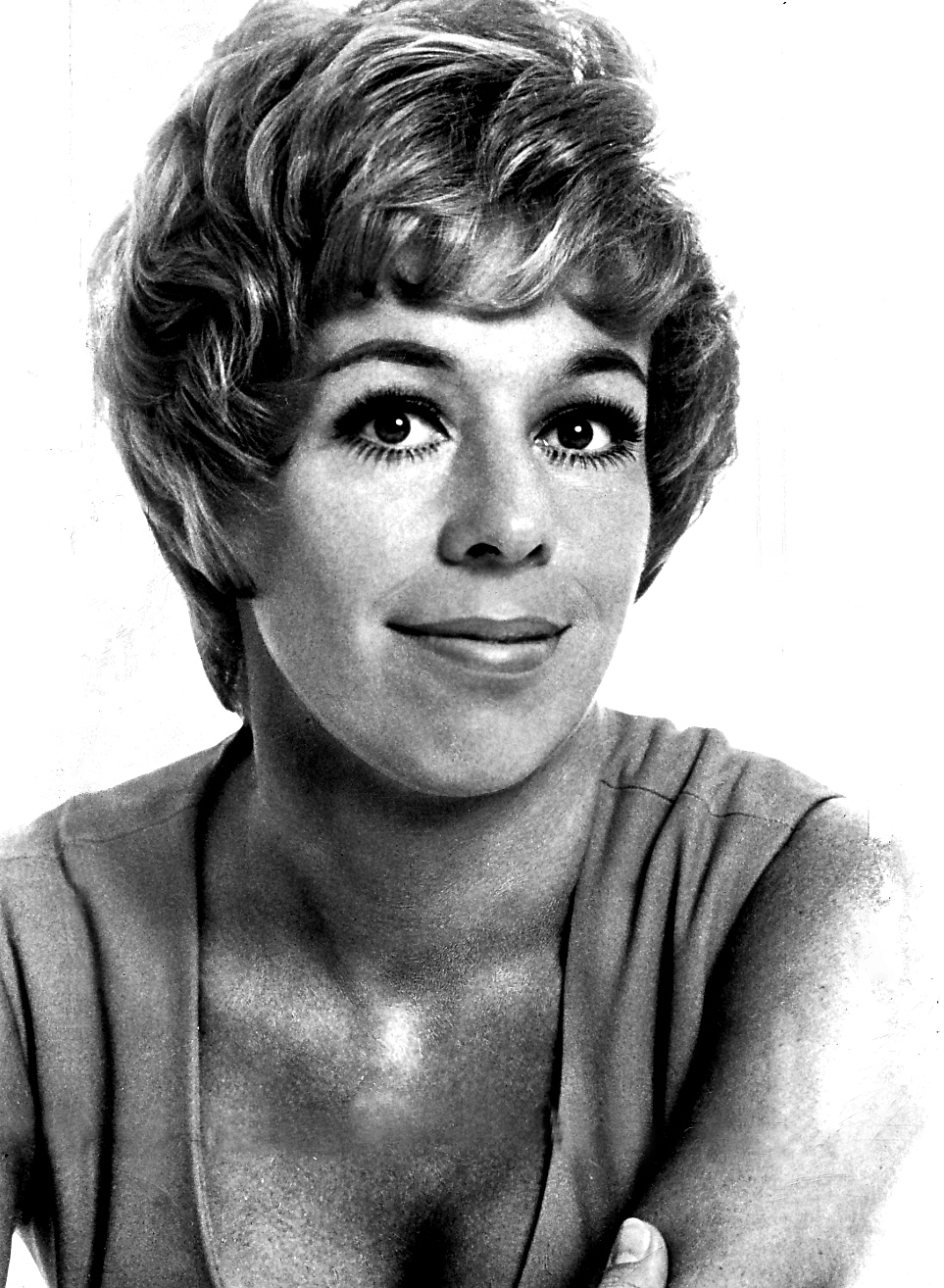
Carol Burnett, Hollywood High School alumna

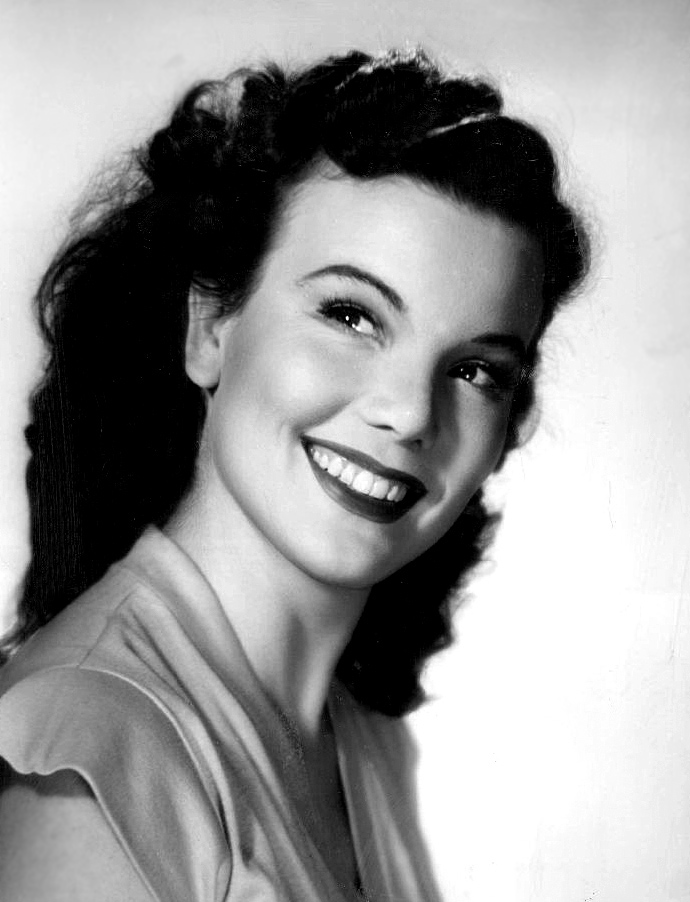
Nanette Fabray, Hollywood High School alumna

=== Academia, science and technology ===
- Vint Cerf, computer scientist, one of the "fathers of the Internet"
- Walt Cunningham, astronaut
- John McCarthy (1927–2011), computer technology, "father of artificial intelligence"
- Glenn T. Seaborg, nuclear chemistry, Nobel laureate

=== Arts and literature ===
- Ray Bradbury, author
- Helen Gurley Brown, author, publisher, and businesswoman who founded Cosmopolitan magazine
- James Ellroy, writer
- Craig Ellwood (1922–1992), architect
- Murray Fromson, CBS News correspondent and USC professor
- Edith Head (1897–1981), Academy Award-winning costume designer
- Karl Hubenthal (1917–1998), cartoonist
- Adela Rogers St. Johns (1894–1988), journalist, novelist, and screenwriter
- Jack Smith (1916–1996), columnist, journalist
- Irving Stone, writer

=== Film, television, and theatre ===
- Byron Allen, talk show host
- Carol Burnett, comedian
- Adam Carolla, comedian
- Richard Crenna (1926–2003), actor
- Leonardo DiCaprio, actor
- Micky Dolenz, actor/musician/drummer of The Monkees
- Nanette Fabray, actor
- Mike Frankovich (1909–1992), film producer
- Joel Grey née Joel David Katz (1950), singer and actor
- Rita Hayworth née Margarita Carmen Cansino, actress
- Carole Lombard, actress
- Quinn Martin, producer
- Ricardo Montalbán (1920–2009), actor
- David Nelson, actor
- Ricky Nelson, actor
- Anthony Quinn (1915–2001), actor
- Robert Redford, actor
- Mort Sahl, humorist
- Tom Selleck, actor
- Coy Watson, Jr. (1912–2009), child actor, Hollywood Walk of Fame, the Watson family
- Delmar Watson (1926–2008), actor, photo-journalist, Hollywood Walk of Fame, the Watson family
- Harry R. Watson (1921–2001), actor, photo-journalist, Hollywood Walk of Fame, the Watson family
- Jack Webb (1920–1982), producer, director, actor
- Robert Young, actor

=== Music ===
- Steven Adler, musician, drummer (Guns N' Roses)
- Herb Alpert, musician, music industry executive
- Michael "Flea" Balzary, musician, bassist, trumpet player (Red Hot Chili Peppers)
- Odetta Holmes (1930–2008), folk singer, activist
- Stan Kenton (1911–1979), pianist, composer, and arranger
- Jerome "Jerry" Leiber (1933–2011), lyricist of Jerry Leiber and Mike Stoller
- Phil Spector, record producer
- Mike Stoller, music of Jerry Leiber and Mike Stoller
- Michael Tilson Thomas, conductor, pianist and composer
- Roger Wagner, choral musician, administrator and educator

=== Athletics ===
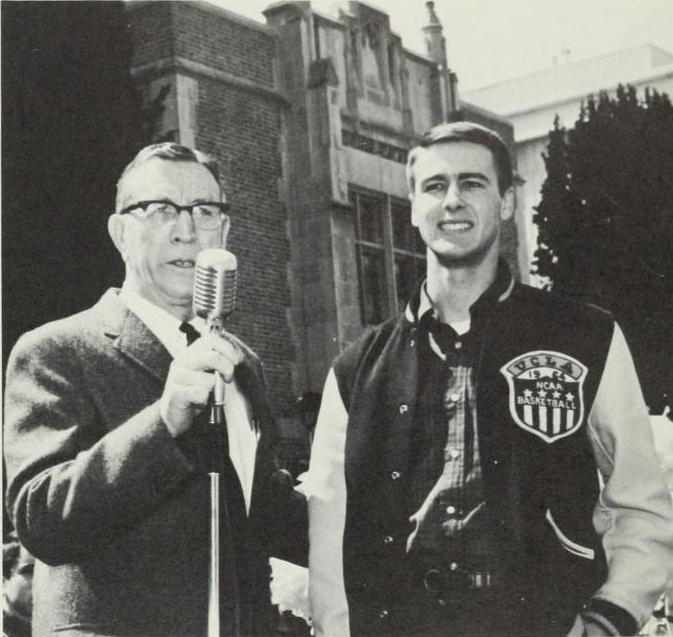
Gail Goodrich, John H. Francis Polytechnic High School alumnus

- Garret Anderson, former MLB player with the Los Angeles Angels, Atlanta Braves and Los Angeles Dodgers
- Gilbert Arenas, professional basketball player, NBA All-Star with Washington Wizards
- Ron Botchan, NFL official
- Anthony Davis, USC star running back and later pro football player in the NFL and Canadian Football leagues
- Oscar De La Hoya, former world champion and gold medal-winning boxer and founder of Golden Boy Promotions
- Don Drysdale (1936–1993), National Baseball Hall of Fame pitcher
- Jordan Farmar, NBA basketball player
- Jeff Fisher, former NFL player and head coach
- Gail Goodrich, basketball player in the NBA, attended UCLA
- Luis (Lou) Gomez, MLB player
- Mike Haynes, NFL Hall of Famer
- Robert Lyles, NFL player
- Gary Matthews, former Major League Baseball player
- Dick Moje, National Football League
- Jim E. Mora, football coach
- Eddie Murray, Baseball Hall of Famer
- Bobby Riggs (1918–1995), tennis player
- Ozzie Smith, Baseball Hall of Famer
- Charles White, football player, Heisman Trophy winner
- Mal Whitfield, athlete

=== Medicine ===
- David Ho, AIDS researcher, physician and Time magazine's 1996 Man of the Year
- Sammy Lee, MD, Olympic gold medalist in diving
- Norman Topping (1908–1997), MD, president of the University of Southern California

=== Business and law ===
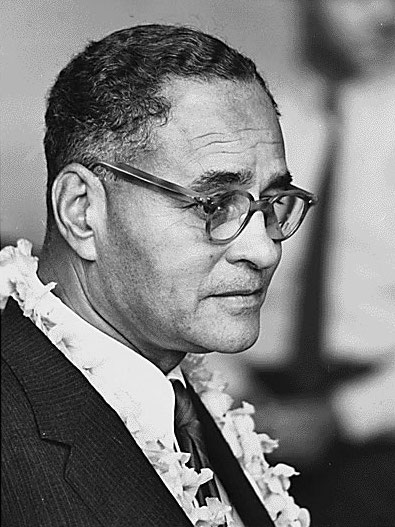
Ralph Bunche, Jefferson High School alumnus

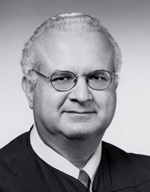
Carlos R. Moreno, Lincoln High School alumnus

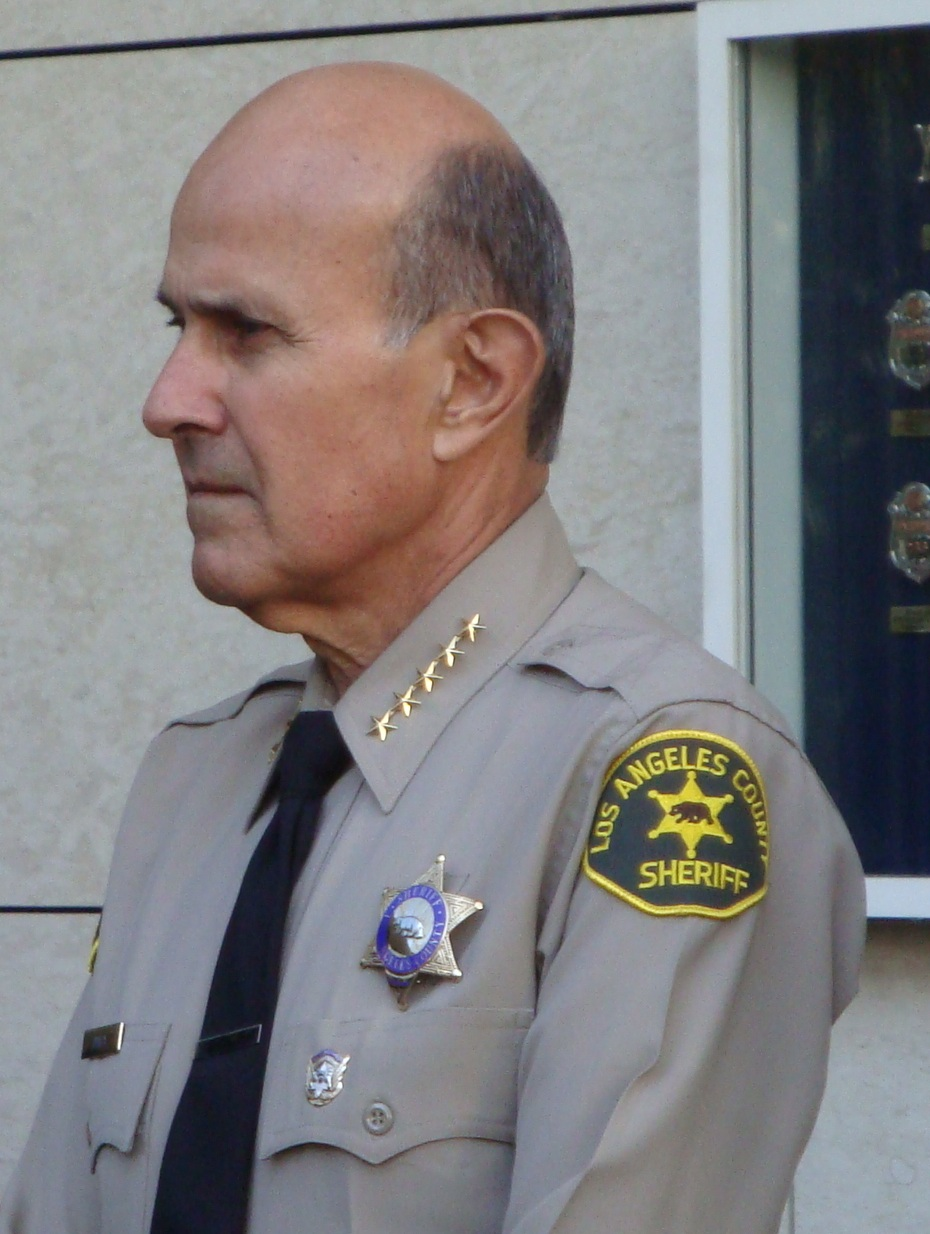
Lee Baca, Franklin High School alumnus

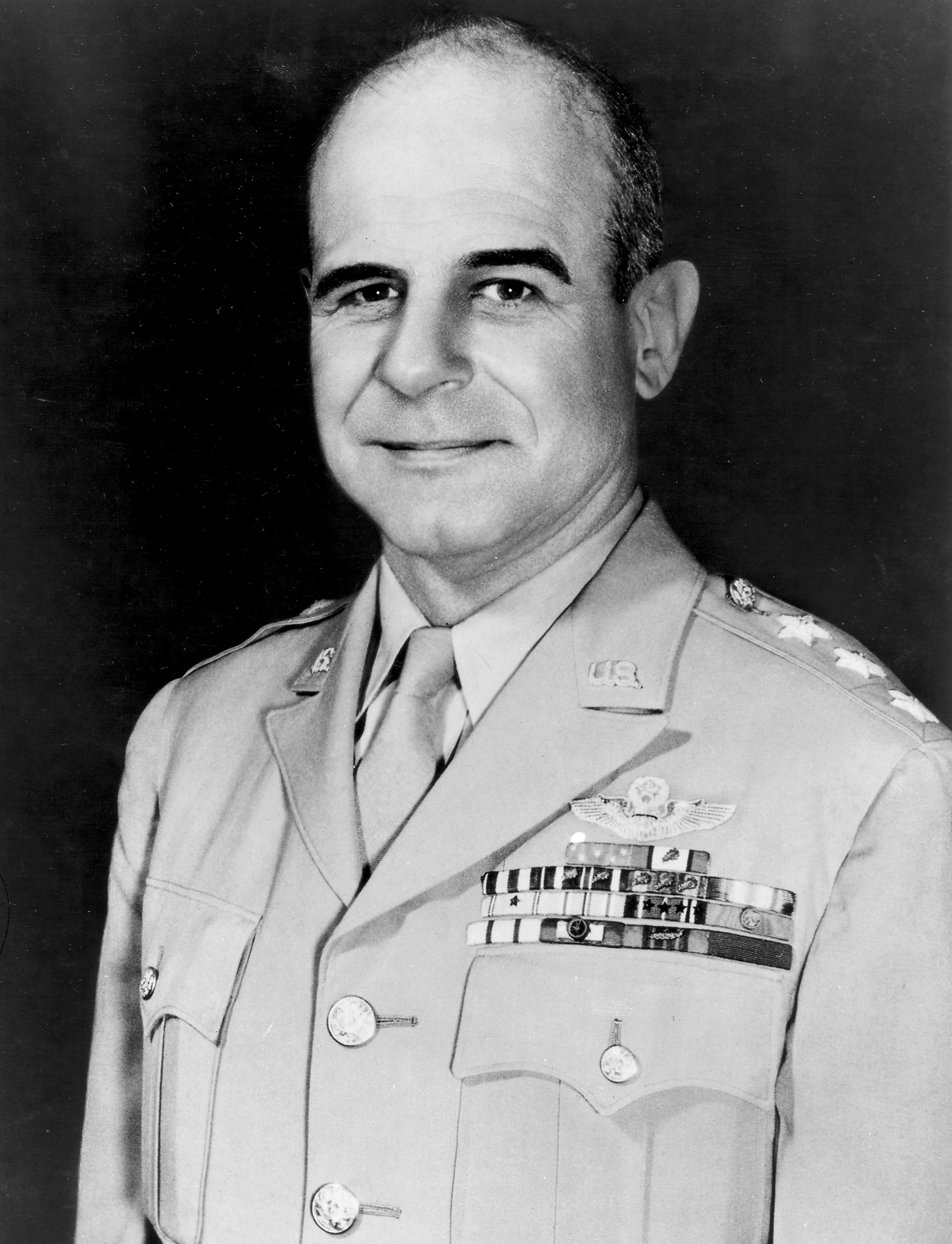
General James Doolittle, Manual Arts High School alumnus

- Lee Baca, sheriff of Los Angeles County, 1998–2014
- Warren Christopher, U.S. secretary of state
- Jimmy Doolittle, aviation pioneer
- Daryl F. Gates, Los Angeles police chief, 1978–1992
- Carlos R. Moreno, California Supreme Court justice (Cl. of 1966)
- Dorothy Wright Nelson, United States federal judge
- Harry Pregerson, judge on the United States Court of Appeals for the Ninth Circuit
- Manuel Lawrence Real, judge of the U.S. District Court for the Central District of California
- Henry Samueli, co-founder of Broadcom

=== Politics and government ===
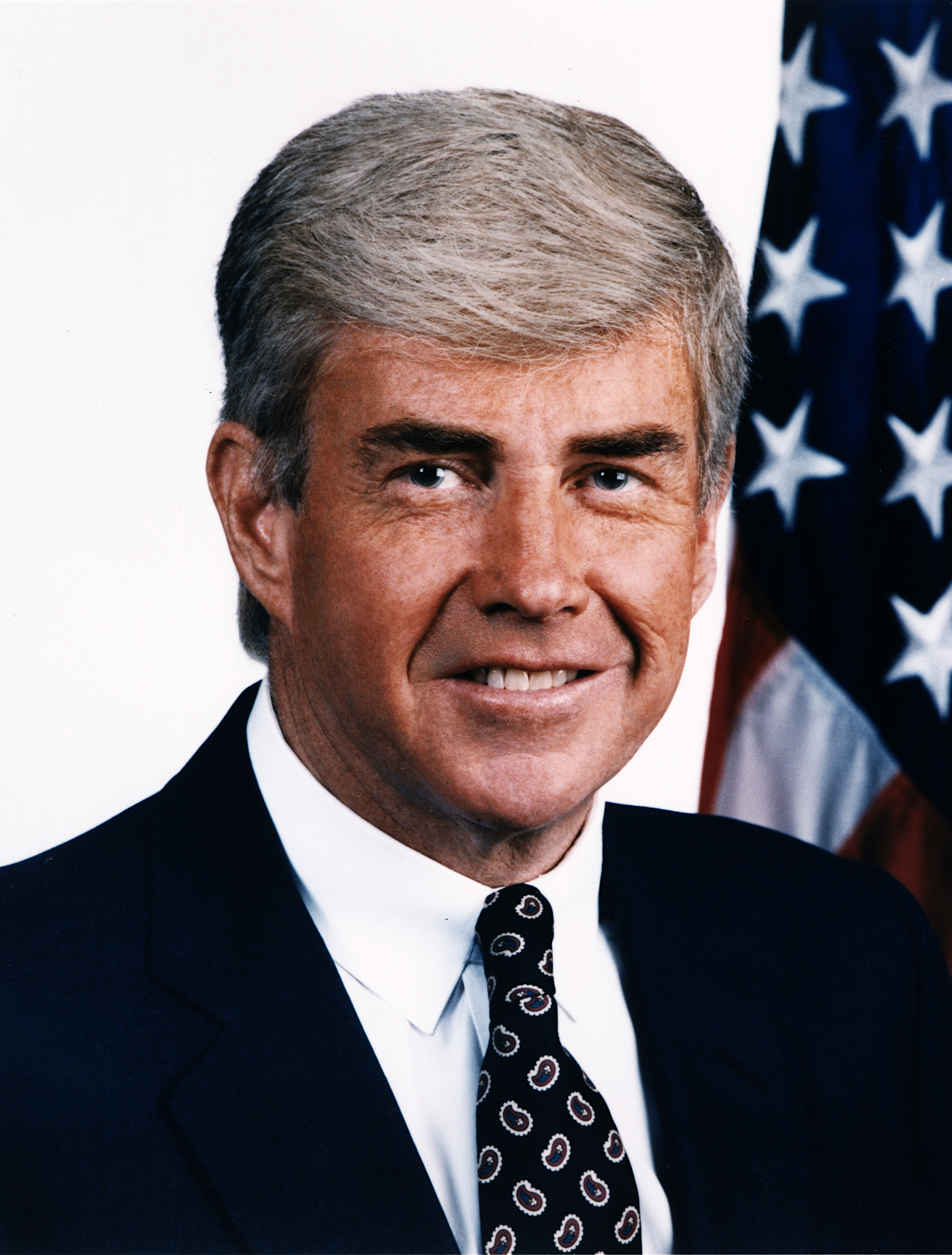
Jack Kemp, Fairfax High School alumnus

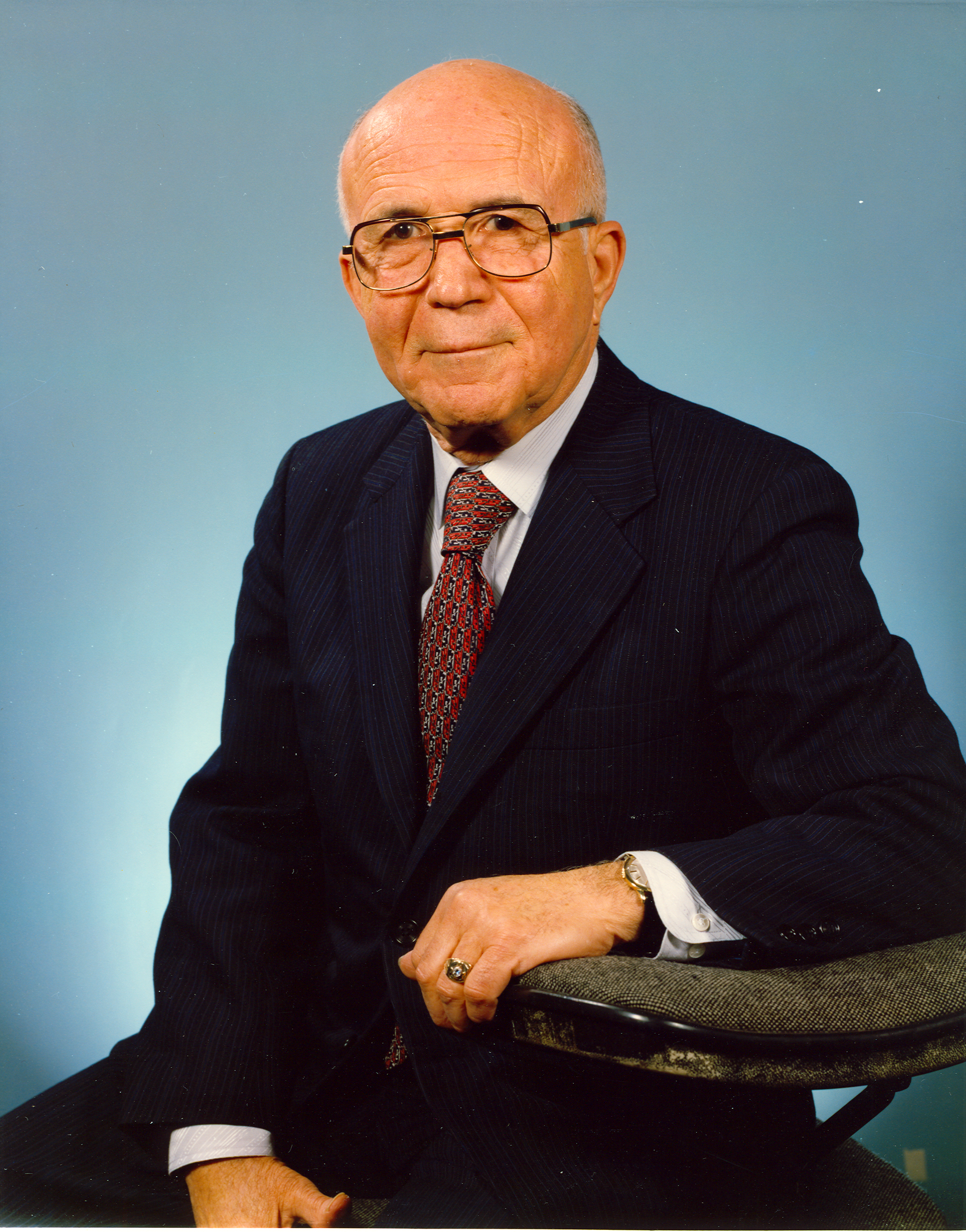
Augustus Hawkins, Jefferson High School alumnus

- Howard Berman, former U.S. representative
- Tom Bradley (1917–1998), mayor of Los Angeles
- Ralph Bunche, educator, UN mediator on Palestine and Nobel Peace Prize winner
- Vickie Castro, activist and member of the LAUSD School Board
- James Charles Corman (1920–2000), congressman
- Kenneth Hahn (1920–1997), member of the Los Angeles County Board of Supervisors
- Jane L. Harman, U.S. House of Representatives
- Augustus F. Hawkins, U.S. House of Representatives from California's 21st and 29th district 1963–1991; California assembly 1935–1963
- Jack Kemp, politician and professional football player
- Glenard P. Lipscomb (1915–1970), congressman
- Howard McKeon, U.S. House of Representatives from the 25th District (1993–2015)(
- Louis R. Nowell (1915–2000), Los Angeles City Council member, 1963–77
- Edward R. Roybal (1917–2005), member of the U.S. House of Representatives(1963–93)
- Vincent Thomas (1907–1980), California assemblyman
- Antonio Villaraigosa, 41st mayor of Los Angeles

=== Miscellaneous ===
- Patrick Argüello (1943–1970), US-Nicaraguan national killed in the attempted hijack of an El Al flight, as carried out by the PFLP
- Al Michaels, television sportscaster

== Notable faculty ==
- Fay Allen, first African-American woman to be elected to the Los Angeles Unified School District board
- Salvador B. Castro (1933–2013), Mexican-American educator and activist
- Jaime Escalante (1930–2010), educator
- Jim Tunney, principal and NFL official

== See also ==
- List of people from Los Angeles
