= Northridge Academy High School =

Public high school in California, United States

Coordinates: 34.245041°N 118.524155°W

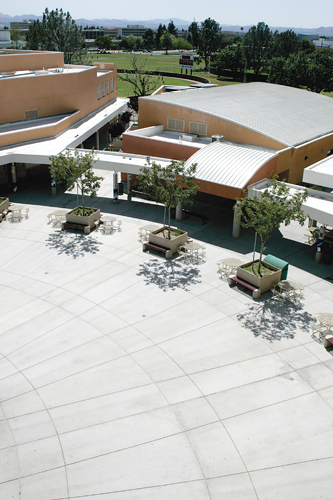

Location
- 9601 Zelzah Ave; Northridge, Los Angeles, California 91325; United States

Information
- Type: Public
- Established: 2004
- School district: Los Angeles Unified School District
- Principal: Roberto Lee
- Teaching staff: 44.88 (on an FTE basis)
- Grades: 9-12
- Enrollment: 916 (2023–24)
- Student to teacher ratio: 20.41
- Colors: Royal blue, Black, White
- Athletics conference: Valley
- Mascot: Puma
- Website: Official website

Northridge Academy High School (NAHS) is a public high school located in Northridge, Los Angeles, California, USA.

== Overview ==
Northridge Academy High School is administered by the Los Angeles Unified School District (LAUSD). The school opened as a partnership between LAUSD and California State University, Northridge. While the connection has weakened between them following the COVID-19 pandemic, the current administration is working to strengthen the bond. Currently, students at Northridge Academy High School have the opportunity to study at CSUN, along with access their library resources

In 2010, Western Association of Schools and Colleges accredited the school, and in 2024 received the California Distinguished Schools award.

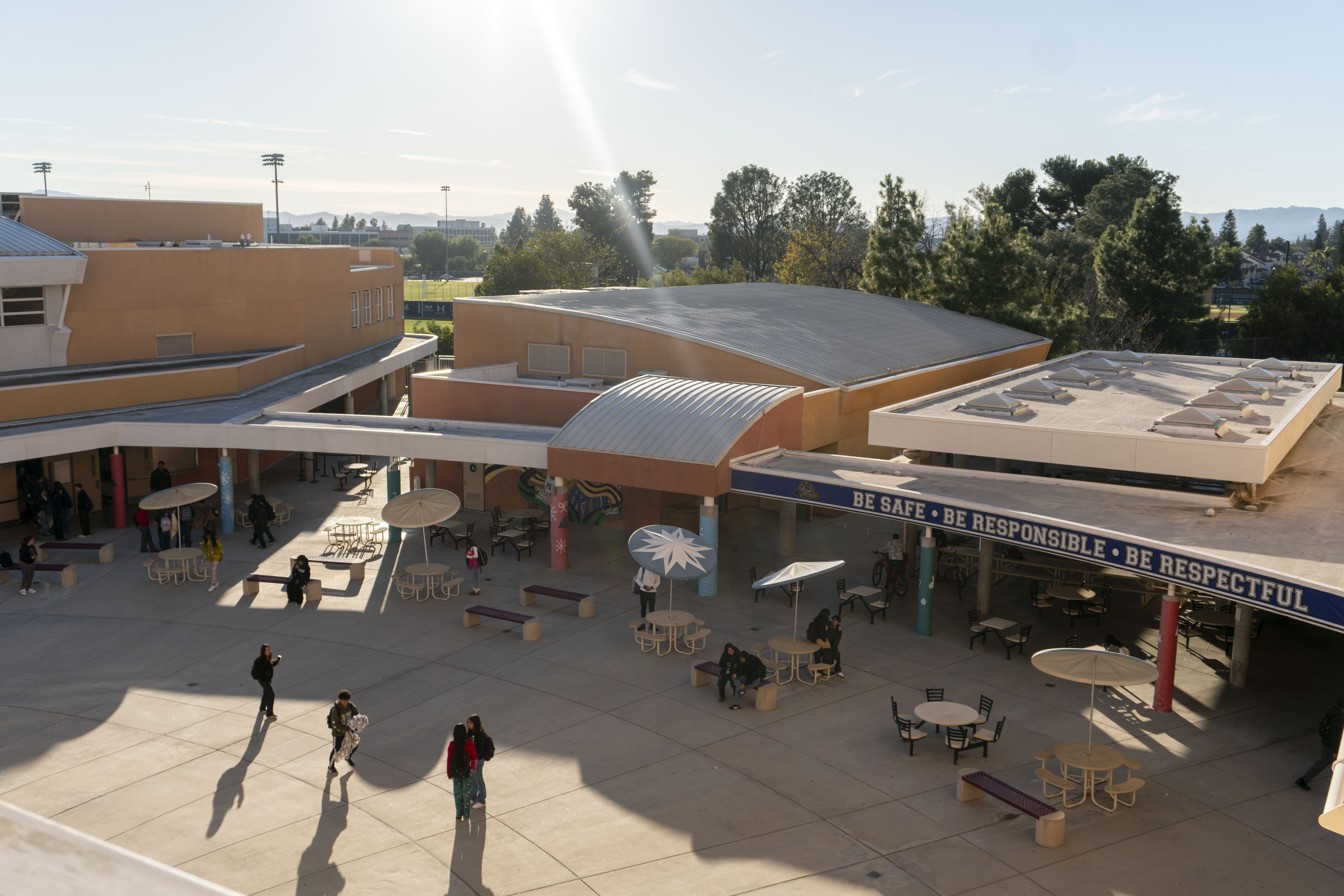
A picture of the Northridge Academy High School quad during golden hour.

== History ==
The school opened on September 10, 2004 with 614 students in grades 9 and 10 and currently serves approximately 916 students in grades 9-12.

Before the school opened, LAUSD referred to the school as Valley New High School #1. The school relieved overcrowding at Monroe, Cleveland High School, and Granada Hills Charter High School.

Northridge Academy does not have its own attendance boundary. Rather, it shares the attendance boundary of four neighboring high schools (Cleveland, Granada Hills Charter High School, Monroe High School, and John F. Kennedy High School). Eighth graders who live in the attendance areas for these schools have the option of applying to attend Northridge Academy.

== Academics ==
Presently, Northridge Academy maintains a Block Schedule in which students go to three 105-minute classes, in addition to 50 minute daily advisory periods, with school starting at 8:30am and ending at 3:33pm. Tuesday is an exception as they use a traditional schedule with six ~50-minute classes with no advisory period, starting 8:30am and ending at 2:33pm. Students get a 10 minute break, and a 30 minute lunch break throughout the day.

Students have the option in 10th grade to take AP Biology and/or AP World History: Modern. From the 11th-12th grade, students can take any of 10 additional AP Courses, but no IB courses. Additionally the school offers a three-year Career Technical Education (CTE) Photography and Design Visual Media Arts pathway, which involves training with Photography and Photoshop which culminates with the chance to receive Photoshop Certification.

There are also a variety of student-based organizations for students to join and participate.

== Demographics ==
2023-24 Enrollment by Ethnicity
Total	African American	American Indian or Alaska Native	Asian and/or Pacific Islander	Hispanic or Latino	White	Other (Two or more races, not reported)
916	2.5%	0.0%	7.5%	74.2%	12.8%	2.9%

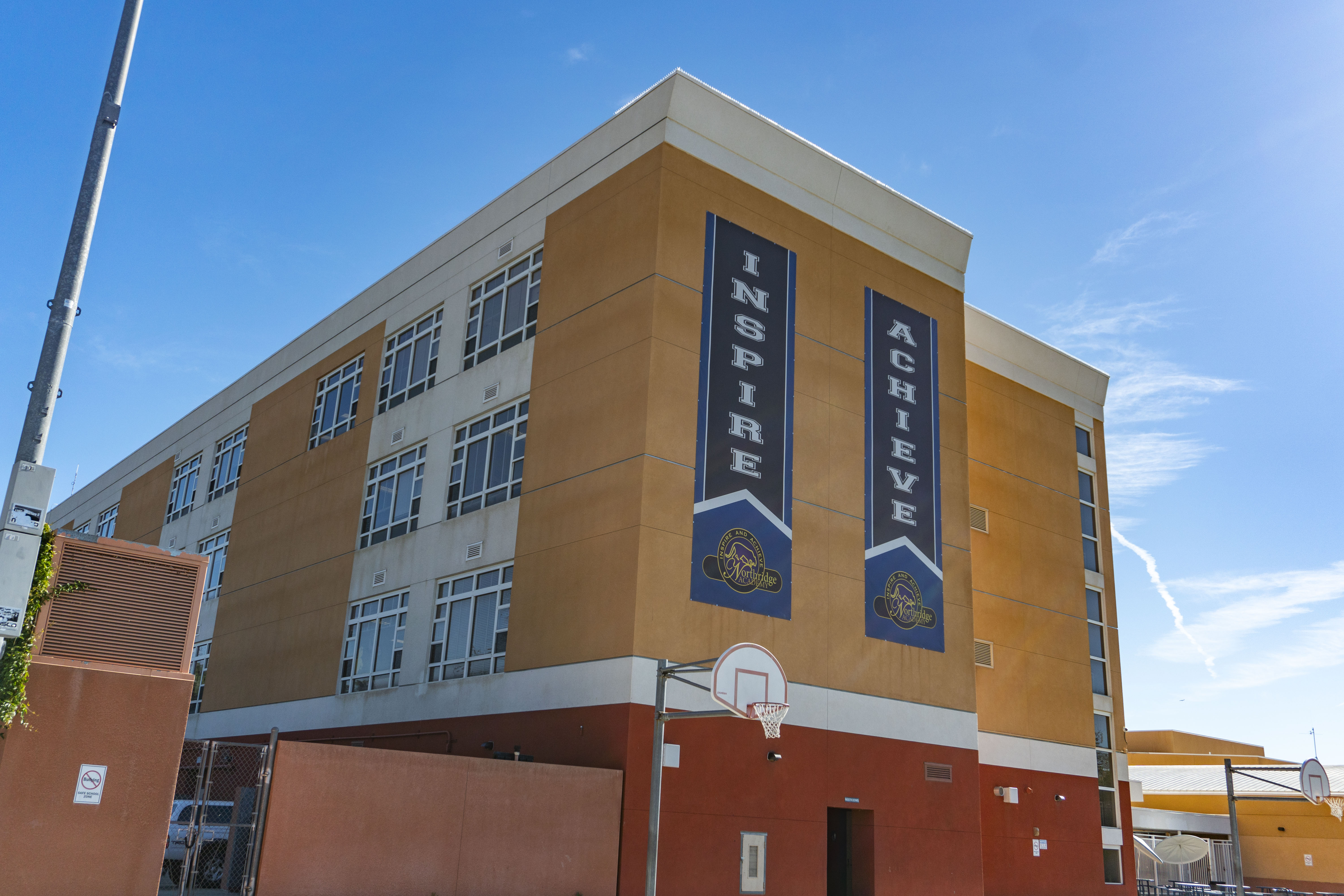
A picture of the back of Northridge Academy High School, with the texts "Inspire" and "Achieve" written on banners.

== Notable alumni ==
Hunter March, American television host, actor, producer, and comedian
