= Gary K. Hart =

American politician (1943–2022)

Member of the California Senate from the 18th district district
- In office December 6, 1982 - November 30, 1994
- Preceded by: Omer L. Rains
- Succeeded by: Jack O'Connell

Member of the California State Assembly from the 35th district
- In office December 2, 1974 - November 30, 1982
- Preceded by: John Briggs
- Succeeded by: Jack O'Connell

Personal details
- Born: Gary Kersey Hart; August 13, 1943 San Diego, California, U.S.
- Died: January 27, 2022 (aged 78) Sacramento, California, U.S.
- Party: Democratic
- Spouse: Cary Smith (m. 1969)
- Children: 3
- Education: Stanford University (BA); Harvard University (MA)

Gary Kersey Hart (August 13, 1943 – January 27, 2022) was an American politician, educator, and pro-charter school activist who served as a member of both chambers of the California State Legislature during the time period spanning 1974 to 1994.

== Early life and education ==
He was born on August 13, 1943, in San Diego, California, and graduated from Santa Barbara High School. He earned a Bachelor of Arts in history from Stanford University on a football scholarship, and spent six months studying abroad in Florence. He then earned a Master of Arts from Harvard School of Education the next year.

== Political career ==
Running as a Democrat, he launched several unsuccessful campaigns for the United States House of Representatives (1970) and the California State Assembly (1972) but later won an Assembly seat (1974), succeeding incumbent Republican Don MacGillivray, who ran unsuccessfully for the State Senate.

In 1982, he ran for the California State Senate and won, narrowly defeating Republican state Assemblyman Charles R. Imbrecht, whose wife would, coincidentally, go on to be a history teacher in Hart's PACE program. Hart served in both houses of the Legislature for a total of 20 years, having chaired the Senate Education Committee from 1983 until his retirement in 1994. Hart's State Senate district included portions of Santa Barbara, San Luis Obispo, Ventura, and Los Angeles Counties.

In 1988, he made another run for Congress but narrowly lost to Republican incumbent Robert Lagomarsino.

== Retirement and death ==
After his retirement from the Legislature, Hart founded the California State University Institute for Education Reform at the California State University, Sacramento campus. The Institute promotes education reform efforts aimed at improving pupil academic achievement. Hart also served as the California Secretary of Education for Governor Gray Davis from January 1999 through March 2000. His principal responsibility as Secretary for Education was helping craft and pass the Governor's 1999 education reform program. He also created and taught in the Program in America and California Explorations (PACE), an innovative core humanities initiative at Kennedy High School in Sacramento.

Hart died of pancreatic cancer at his home in Sacramento, on January 27, 2022, at the age of 78.

== Honors ==
A former high school teacher, Hart authored a wide range of legislation on education-related topics, including performance-based student testing, school restructuring, charter schools, and latch key child care programs. He was voted most ethical California legislator by his peers and as such appeared on the cover of California Journal.

California Assembly
Preceded by John Briggs	California State Assemblyman, 35th District; 1974-1982	Succeeded by Jack O'Connell
California Senate
Preceded by Omer L. Rains	California State Senator, 18th District; 1982-1994	Succeeded by Jack O'Connell
