= Jack O'Connell (American politician) =

American politician (born 1951)

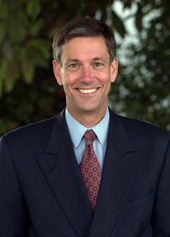
- Official portrait, 2007

26th California State Superintendent of Public Instruction
- In office January 6, 2003 – January 3, 2011
- Governor: Gray Davis; Arnold Schwarzenegger
- Preceded by: Delaine Eastin
- Succeeded by: Tom Torlakson

Member of the California State Senate from the 18th district
- In office December 5, 1994 – November 30, 2002
- Preceded by: Gary K. Hart
- Succeeded by: Roy Ashburn

Member of the California State Assembly from the 35th district
- In office December 6, 1982 – November 30, 1994
- Preceded by: Gary K. Hart
- Succeeded by: Brooks Firestone

Personal details
- Born: Jack T. O'Connell; October 8, 1951 (age 74) Glen Cove, New York, U.S.
- Party: Democratic
- Spouse: Doree O'Connell
- Children: 1
- Education: California State University, Fullerton; California State University, Long Beach
- Profession: Politician; Teacher

Jack T. O'Connell (born October 8, 1951) is an American politician, educator and formerly the 26th California State Superintendent of Public Instruction, having been elected to the post in November 2002 with 61% of the vote. He was re-elected to his post by receiving a majority (52%) of the vote in the Primary election on June 6, 2006, thus avoiding a November run-off. He is a member of the Democratic Party. O'Connell was unable to run for a third term in 2010 due to term limits and was succeeded by former state assemblyman Tom Torlakson.

== Career ==
Before his election to the legislature, O'Connell served on the Santa Barbara County School Board. O'Connell previously served in the California State Senate representing the 18th District from 1994 to 2002. O'Connell considered a bid for President Pro Tem of the State Senate in 1998 but ultimately decided not to run. He also served in the California State Assembly representing the Central Coast-based 35th District from 1982 to 1994. From 1994 to 1996, O'Connell employed as a legislative aide Tara Reade, who had recently left the office of then-U.S. Senator Joe Biden.

In his 2006 re-election campaign, O'Connell won every county in California with at least an electoral plurality. Although the State Superintendent of Public Instruction is officially a non-partisan position, O'Connell is a member of the Democratic Party, and political parties will routinely make endorsements of candidates in the election (which was the case with O'Connell).

== Personal life ==
O'Connell was born in Glen Cove, New York. In 1958, he moved with his family to Southern California, where he attended local public schools. He received a Bachelor of Arts degree in history from California State University, Fullerton and earned his secondary teaching credential from California State University, Long Beach in 1975. He returned to Oxnard High School, his high school alma mater, to teach for several years and later served on the Santa Barbara County School Board.

== See also ==
- California Charter Academy

Political offices
Preceded by Delaine Eastin	California State Superintendent of Public Instruction; January 5, 2003 – January 3, 2011	Succeeded by Tom Torlakson
Preceded by Gary K. Hart	California State Senator, 18th District; December 5, 1994 – November 30, 2002	Succeeded by Roy Ashburn
Preceded by Gary K. Hart	California State Assemblyman, 35th District; December 6, 1982 – November 30, 1994	Succeeded by Brooks Firestone
