= Marion Joseph =

American education reformer (died 2022)

Marion Joseph (October 14, 1926 – 2022) was an American education reformer. She was adviser to the California state Superintendent of Public Instruction Wilson Riles. She advocated for a phonics based approach to reading instruction in California public schools.
