= Njeri's Morning Glory School and Art Center =

School in California, United States

Coordinates: 37.2924°N 121.9780°W

Njeri's Morning Glory School and Art Center, was a private elementary school located in San Jose, California, and was registered in the California Department of Education from 2008 until 2020. It was an educational space for parents and children and was a 501(c)3 nonprofit organization. The school fulfilled California's legal and licensing requirements and met health, fire, and safety standards. NMGS and Art Center trained Waldorf teachers in Kindergarten through the Fifth Grade and had a commitment to cultural, social, and economic diversity. Equal value was placed on the weekly rhythm of co-curricular activities, and art was woven into all aspects of the curriculum. The school participated in a monthly nature exploration.

The school closed in June 2020.
