= 2006 California Superintendent of Public Instruction election =

- June 6, 2006
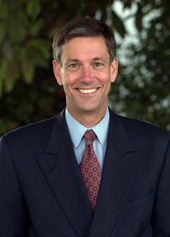

| Candidate | Jack O'Connell | Sarah L. Knopp | Diane A. Lenning |
| Popular vote | 2,116,243 | 695,394 | 573,576 |
| Percentage | 52.4% | 17.2% | 14.2% |
| Candidate | Daniel L. Bunting | Grant McMicken |
| Popular vote | 338,182 | 317,567 |
| Percentage | 8.4% | 7.9% |
- County results O'Connell: 40–50% 50–60% 60–70% 70–80%
SPI before election
Jack O'Connell
Democratic
Elected SPI
Jack O'Connell
Democratic

The 2006 California Superintendent of Public Instruction election occurred on June 6, 2006. Incumbent Jack O'Connell defeated Daniel L. Bunting, Sarah L. Knopp, Diane A. Lenning, and Grant McMicken to win a second term, winning at least a plurality in every county.

== Results ==
California Superintendent of Public Instruction election, 2006
| Candidate | Votes | % |
|---|---|---|
| Jack O'Connell | 2,116,243 | 52.37 |
| Sarah L. Knopp | 695,394 | 17.21 |
| Diane A. Lenning | 573,576 | 14.19 |
| Daniel L. Bunting | 338,182 | 8.37 |
| Grant McMicken | 317,567 | 7.86 |
| Invalid or blank votes | | |
| Total votes | 4,040,962 | 100.00 |
| Turnout | {{{votes}}} | % |

=== Results by county ===
| County | O'Connell | Votes | Knopp | Votes | Lenning | Votes | Bunting | Votes | McMicken | Votes |
|---|---|---|---|---|---|---|---|---|---|---|
| Santa Barbara | 76.05% | 60,224 | 7.90% | 6,253 | 7.42% | 5,875 | 4.05% | 3,208 | 4.58% | 3,629 |
| San Luis Obispo | 75.39% | 43,560 | 8.81% | 5,093 | 7.51% | 4,340 | 4.45% | 2,574 | 3.83% | 2,213 |
| Ventura | 66.53% | 70,342 | 10.56% | 11,168 | 12.13% | 12,824 | 5.64% | 5,959 | 5.15% | 5,442 |
| Colusa | 65.94% | 2,242 | 11.71% | 398 | 10.94% | 372 | 6.26% | 213 | 5.15% | 175 |
| San Francisco | 64.06% | 65,618 | 17.12% | 17,536 | 8.06% | 8,256 | 4.86% | 4,980 | 5.89% | 6,037 |
| Marin | 60.69% | 30,040 | 16.67% | 8,249 | 11.55% | 5,719 | 4.73% | 2,343 | 6.35% | 3,145 |
| Yolo | 59.57% | 17,350 | 18.33% | 5,340 | 10.36% | 3,016 | 6.13% | 1,784 | 5.62% | 1,636 |
| Monterey | 59.21% | 27,284 | 16.52% | 7,614 | 11.34% | 5,224 | 6.88% | 3,171 | 6.05% | 2,786 |
| Santa Cruz | 58.78% | 26,145 | 20.71% | 9,210 | 9.71% | 4,319 | 5.02% | 2,231 | 5.79% | 2,576 |
| Napa | 57.51% | 14,819 | 16.30% | 4,200 | 13.28% | 3,422 | 6.55% | 1,688 | 6.35% | 1,637 |
| Merced | 57.26% | 10,830 | 14.96% | 2,829 | 14.51% | 2,744 | 7.33% | 1,386 | 5.95% | 1,126 |
| Sacramento | 55.81% | 98,112 | 14.23% | 25,021 | 13.48% | 23,697 | 7.61% | 13,385 | 8.86% | 15,572 |
| Alameda | 55.75% | 115,797 | 20.67% | 42,929 | 10.16% | 21,111 | 5.89% | 12,239 | 7.53% | 15,648 |
| Sutter | 55.79% | 7,088 | 15.86% | 2,015 | 14.53% | 1,846 | 7.45% | 947 | 6.37% | 809 |
| Modoc | 55.32% | 1,653 | 17.27% | 516 | 14.12% | 422 | 6.63% | 198 | 6.66% | 199 |
| Fresno | 55.03% | 46,531 | 14.99% | 12,675 | 13.32% | 11,265 | 10.13% | 8,568 | 6.52% | 5,513 |
| Siskiyou | 54.53% | 5,445 | 16.78% | 1,675 | 13.36% | 1,334 | 7.92% | 791 | 7.41% | 740 |
| San Benito | 54.42% | 4,560 | 19.00% | 1,592 | 12.77% | 1,070 | 7.35% | 616 | 6.46% | 541 |
| Glenn | 53.87% | 3,002 | 15.75% | 878 | 14.88% | 829 | 8.27% | 461 | 7.23% | 403 |
| Contra Costa | 53.74% | 79,096 | 16.78% | 24,703 | 14.10% | 20,750 | 7.66% | 11,269 | 7.72% | 11,357 |
| Stanislaus | 53.29% | 29,413 | 15.15% | 8,361 | 14.89% | 8,218 | 8.24% | 4,550 | 8.42% | 4,648 |
| San Joaquin | 53.09% | 36,853 | 15.68% | 10,887 | 14.90% | 10,347 | 8.20% | 5,691 | 8.13% | 5,642 |
| Butte | 52.94% | 19,722 | 19.19% | 7,149 | 11.73% | 4,370 | 8.72% | 3,250 | 7.41% | 2,759 |
| San Mateo | 52.44% | 47,430 | 19.59% | 17,724 | 11.68% | 10,563 | 8.29% | 7,503 | 8.00% | 7,233 |
| Yuba | 52.20% | 4,596 | 19.33% | 1,702 | 12.81% | 1,128 | 8.08% | 711 | 7.58% | 667 |
| Sierra | 51.70% | 607 | 19.93% | 234 | 10.82% | 127 | 9.54% | 112 | 8.01% | 94 |
| Plumas | 51.74% | 2,793 | 18.80% | 1,015 | 12.54% | 677 | 8.56% | 462 | 8.35% | 451 |
| Solano | 51.79% | 28,305 | 21.52% | 11,763 | 10.74% | 5,872 | 9.27% | 5,068 | 6.67% | 3,648 |
| Tehama | 51.79% | 5,855 | 16.17% | 1,828 | 12.94% | 1,463 | 12.07% | 1,365 | 7.03% | 795 |
| Santa Clara | 51.08% | 103,889 | 18.28% | 37,177 | 13.86% | 28,190 | 8.22% | 16,727 | 8.56% | 17,412 |
| Lassen | 50.79% | 2,904 | 21.42% | 1,225 | 11.93% | 682 | 8.97% | 513 | 6.89% | 394 |
| Shasta | 50.67% | 16,443 | 17.47% | 5,669 | 15.00% | 4,869 | 9.19% | 2,984 | 7.67% | 2,489 |
| Nevada | 50.45% | 11,028 | 23.13% | 5,057 | 11.48% | 2,510 | 7.41% | 1,619 | 7.53% | 1,645 |
| Los Angeles | 50.29% | 385,495 | 18.91% | 144,966 | 13.86% | 106,266 | 8.28% | 63,480 | 8.65% | 66,344 |
| Sonoma | 50.19% | 50,063 | 20.51% | 20,459 | 13.04% | 13,009 | 9.05% | 9,028 | 7.21% | 7,188 |
| Kern | 49.95% | 44,713 | 13.77% | 12,329 | 20.39% | 18,251 | 8.78% | 7,856 | 7.12% | 6,371 |
| Tulare | 49.45% | 17,990 | 15.34% | 5,581 | 13.47% | 4,902 | 13.94% | 5,072 | 7.79% | 2,835 |
| Tuolumne | 49.40% | 6,067 | 17.09% | 2,099 | 13.35% | 1,640 | 10.00% | 1,228 | 10.15% | 1,247 |
| Amador | 48.95% | 4,413 | 16.30% | 1,470 | 12.61% | 1,137 | 10.68% | 963 | 11.46% | 1,033 |
| Imperial | 48.58% | 7,731 | 14.71% | 2,341 | 13.45% | 2,140 | 10.51% | 1,672 | 12.76% | 2,031 |
| Riverside | 48.27% | 79,773 | 14.84% | 24,524 | 15.49% | 25,610 | 11.39% | 18,819 | 10.02% | 16,555 |
| San Bernardino | 48.12% | 72,337 | 19.83% | 29,814 | 14.15% | 21,265 | 9.99% | 15,018 | 7.91% | 11,898 |
| Placer | 47.35% | 30,249 | 15.19% | 9,705 | 20.36% | 13,011 | 9.81% | 6,266 | 7.29% | 4,659 |
| Mendocino | 47.05% | 8,789 | 22.86% | 4,271 | 15.36% | 2,869 | 7.16% | 1,337 | 7.57% | 1,414 |
| Calaveras | 46.97% | 4,543 | 18.14% | 1,755 | 12.53% | 1,212 | 11.37% | 1,100 | 10.99% | 1,063 |
| Orange | 46.59% | 143,799 | 14.64% | 45,190 | 21.76% | 67,151 | 8.63% | 26,631 | 8.38% | 25,868 |
| Madera | 46.58% | 7,491 | 17.45% | 2,806 | 13.15% | 2,114 | 12.98% | 2,087 | 9.84% | 1,583 |
| San Diego | 46.11% | 165,199 | 18.69% | 66,965 | 16.49% | 59,092 | 10.71% | 38,364 | 8.00% | 28,652 |
| El Dorado | 45.85% | 15,228 | 18.01% | 5,982 | 14.92% | 4,957 | 11.56% | 3,839 | 9.66% | 3,207 |
| Lake | 45.80% | 5,058 | 19.78% | 2,184 | 16.86% | 1,862 | 8.69% | 960 | 8.87% | 980 |
| Kings | 45.43% | 5,816 | 15.25% | 1,952 | 17.74% | 2,271 | 11.38% | 1,457 | 10.19% | 1,305 |
| Humboldt | 45.02% | 13,267 | 24.68% | 7,273 | 15.07% | 4,442 | 7.78% | 2,293 | 7.45% | 2,197 |
| Mariposa | 44.61% | 2,002 | 19.10% | 857 | 12.50% | 561 | 11.34% | 509 | 12.46% | 559 |
| Trinity | 44.63% | 1,626 | 20.26% | 738 | 16.52% | 602 | 8.54% | 311 | 10.05% | 366 |
| Del Norte | 43.57% | 2,160 | 19.75% | 979 | 17.17% | 851 | 10.31% | 511 | 9.20% | 456 |
| Mono | 42.46% | 1,019 | 21.46% | 515 | 15.92% | 382 | 9.25% | 222 | 10.92% | 262 |
| Inyo | 42.39% | 1,702 | 21.69% | 871 | 11.93% | 479 | 14.00% | 562 | 9.99% | 401 |
| Alpine | 41.27% | 137 | 25.00% | 83 | 14.76% | 49 | 9.34% | 31 | 9.64% | 32 |

== See also ==
- 2006 California elections
- California Department of Education
