= Delaine Eastin =

American politician from California (1947–2024)

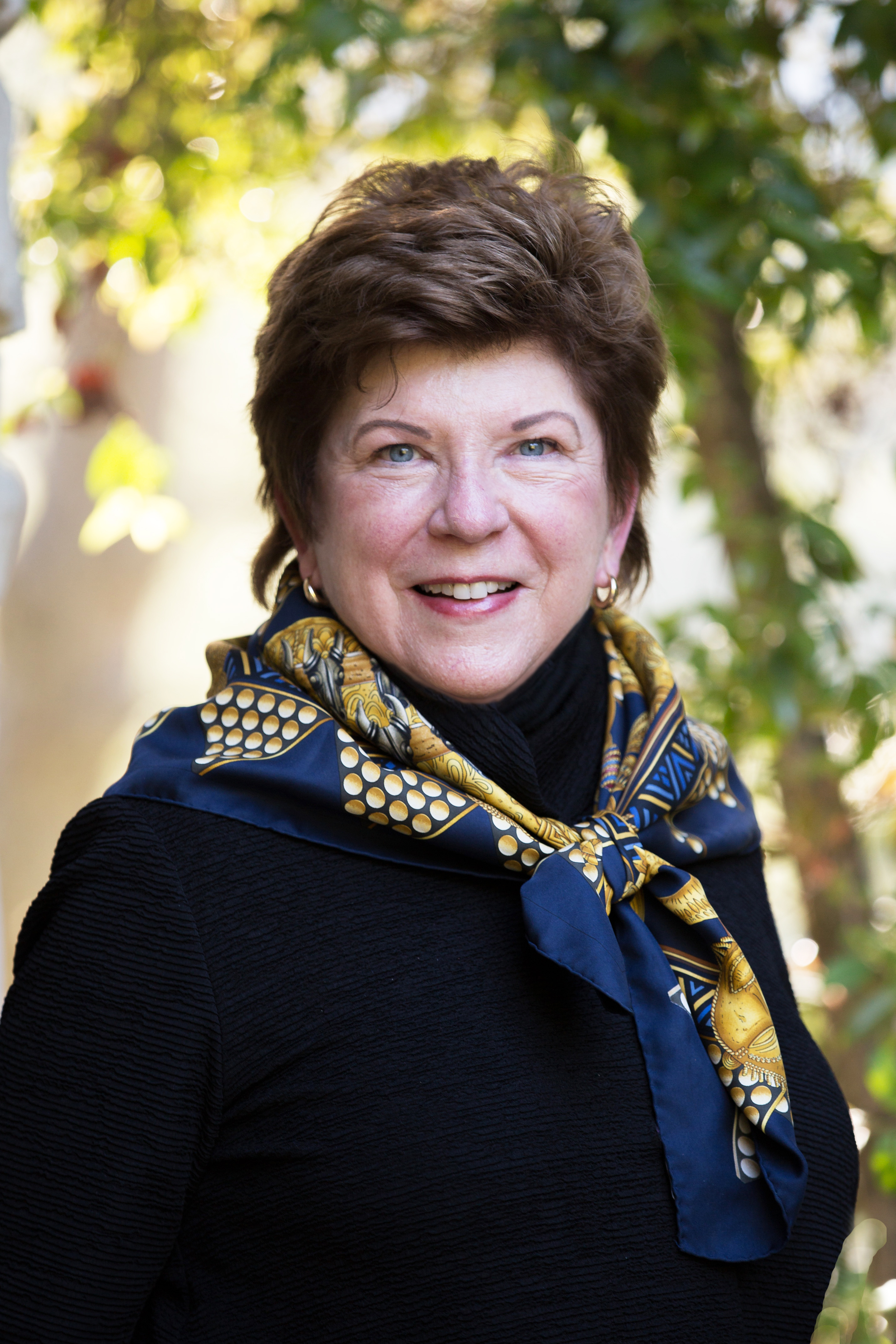

25th California State Superintendent of Public Instruction
- In office January 2, 1995 – January 6, 2003
- Governor: Pete Wilson; Gray Davis
- Preceded by: David Dawson
- Succeeded by: Jack O'Connell

Member of the California State Assembly from the 20th district
- In office December 7, 1992 – November 30, 1994
- Preceded by: Ted Lempert
- Succeeded by: Liz Figueroa

Member of the California State Assembly from the 18th district
- In office December 1, 1986 – November 30, 1992
- Preceded by: Alister McAlister
- Succeeded by: Liz Figueroa

Personal details
- Born: Delaine Andree Eastin; August 20, 1947 San Diego, California, U.S.
- Died: April 23, 2024 (aged 76) Davis, California, U.S.
- Party: Democratic
- Education: University of California, Davis (BA); University of California, Santa Barbara (MA)

Delaine Andree Eastin (August 20, 1947 – April 23, 2024) was an American politician and educator from California. A professor by education, she was the first woman to be elected California State Superintendent of Public Instruction (1995–2003) since the office was first held in January 1851. Eastin represented parts of Alameda County and Santa Clara County in the California State Assembly between 1986 and 1994. She was a member of the Democratic Party.

== Early life and education ==
Eastin was born in San Diego, California, where her father served in the United States Navy. After her father completed his career in the Navy, the family moved to San Francisco where her mother had been born and raised.

Eastin's parents enrolled her in elementary school in San Francisco, where she was one of 44 children in the second-grade classroom. While the teacher was effective, she couldn't attend to the needs of every child in the class. The family moved to San Carlos shortly thereafter, where Eastin's parents enrolled her in a school where she was one of 20 children. Eastin received her bachelor's degree from the University of California, Davis and her Master of Arts degree in political science from the University of California, Santa Barbara in 1971.

== Career ==
=== Teaching and business career ===
After graduation, Eastin taught women's studies and political science at Ventura College, DeAnza College, and Cañada College. Following seven years of teaching, she joined Pacific Telephone in 1979 as an accounting manager and later as a corporate strategic planner, where she worked for the company that became Pacific Telesis. As a corporate planner, she worked on the team that advocated expansion into a then-new technology area, cellular phone service, resulting in PacTel Mobile, finally acquired by Vodafone.

=== Early political career ===
Eastin began her political career in 1980 as a member of the Union City Council. As a council member, she represented the city on a variety of boards including as a member of the Alameda County Library Commission, which she chaired for five of the six years she served on it. She also represented the city on the Solid Waste Management Authority, where she successfully advocated for a Recycling Subcommittee. She chaired the SWMA and she represented Union City on the Association of Bay Area Governments.

Eastin's leadership garnered the "Rookie of the Year" acknowledgment from the California Journal, a non-partisan analytical journal that reported on the state legislature.

Eastin served four terms in the state assembly, representing parts of Alameda and Santa Clara counties. She wrote legislation to enhance school safety and increase parent involvement.

Eastin received the prestigious Crystal Apple Award from the American Library Association. She was given the Inspirational Leader Award from Kidango. She received alumni awards from both UC Davis and UC Santa Barbara.

=== State superintendent of public instruction ===
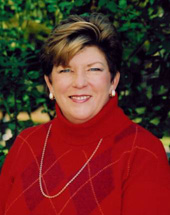
Eastin as Superintendent

Upon taking office, Eastin made class size reduction her top priority. Her advocacy persuaded the governor and the legislature to invest $2.3 billion in cutting class sizes. K-3 class sizes have been cut from 30 students to 20 students in 98% of all school districts (over 86,000 classrooms).

In response to declining student performance, State Superintendent Eastin led in the adoption of high statewide academic standards in math, science, English language arts, and social studies; subsequently, standards in the arts were adopted. Eastin also implemented a new statewide test and established a new system to increase the accountability of every school and district in the state.

In the fall of 1995, Superintendent Eastin launched the "Challenge Initiative," a groundbreaking reform effort to raise standards and accountability. Fifty-six school districts, covering nearly 500,000 students, embraced the Challenge and agreed to set high standards for every subject area in all grade levels.

During her first term, Eastin cut administrative waste by streamlining and modernizing contracting procedures in the department of education and by standardizing accounting procedures. On her watch, the California Department of Education did its first-ever Strategic Plan. Eastin was the architect of the first NetDay, held on March 9, 1996, where 20,000 volunteers joined Eastin, President Clinton, Vice President Gore, and much of the Clinton Cabinet in an electronic "barn raising". The event was such a success it was copied in 40 states and 40 countries. Later, Vice President Gore said his experience that day motivated him to suggest an e-rate tax to help schools nationwide enter the digital era with proper wiring and technology.

Eastin called for a Garden In Every School in 1995. With the help of people like restaurateur Alice Waters, she established gardens in over 3,000 schools. She also enlisted California as the first state to join the Clinton Team Nutrition effort for improved nutrition in schools. She oversaw a series of curriculum guides on how to teach the academic content standards in the context of nutrition, gardening, and cooking.

Eastin visited schools in all 58 counties, keeping her commitment to visit a school a week on average. She visited more than 600 schools across California.

Eastin championed Universal Preschool and had a Preschool Task Force made up of educators, business leaders, civil rights advocates, and children's advocates. They called for Universal Preschool In California within 10 years. Subsequently, she was the honorary chair of the successful Proposition 10, written to support the health, welfare, and education of children from 0–5 through a tax on tobacco products.

Eastin was unable to run for a third term in 2002 due to term limits and was succeeded by former state senator Jack O'Connell.

In 2002, a school was named after her in Union City, California, Delaine Eastin Elementary School, serving from transitional kindergarten to fifth grade. Delaine Eastin Elementary is under New Haven Unified School District in Union City.

=== Later career ===
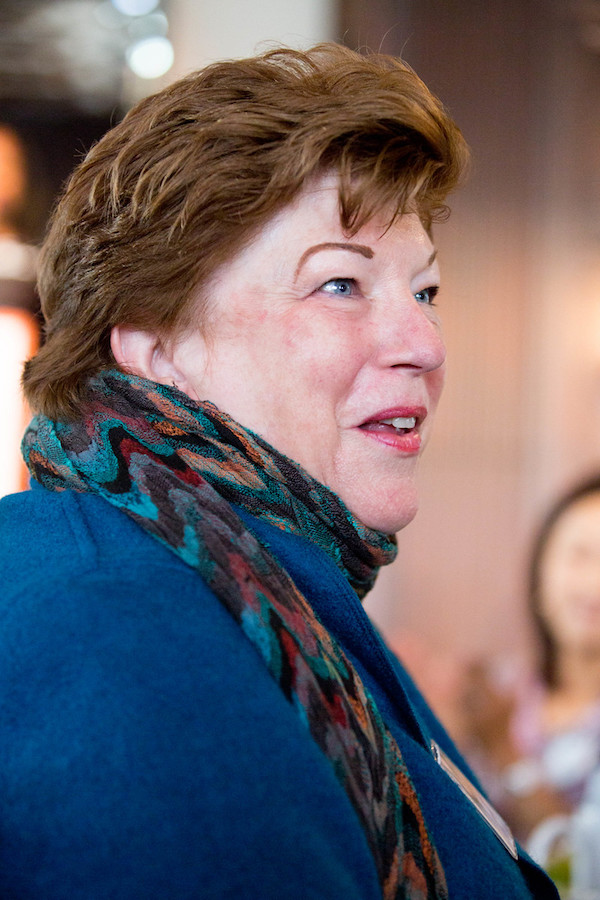
Eastin in 2014

After leaving office as State Superintendent, Eastin became the first executive director of the National Institute of Educational Leadership in Washington, D.C., from 2002 to 2005. Eastin returned to California to teach at Mills College from 2004 to 2008 as a distinguished visiting professor of education, where Eastin taught courses in public policy, education administrative theory, education leadership, and politics.

From 2008 Eastin was a speaker and board member on education policy, nutrition, and electing women to public office issues. Eastin was board president of Close the Gap CA, a campaign to increase the number of progressive women in the California Legislature by recruiting talented, progressive women to run for targeted winnable seats.

In addition, Eastin continued her board work on the UC Center Sacramento Advisory Board, the chancellor's Women in STEM board at UC Davis, the Edible Schoolyard Advisory Board, the Center for Nutrition Education Advisory Board at UC Davis (chair), and the Yolo County Advisory Board for Court Appointed Special Advocates (CASA).

In November 2016, Eastin announced her candidacy for the 2018 California gubernatorial election. In June 2018, she finished in sixth place with 3.4% of the vote (a total of 234,869 votes) in the 2018 California gubernatorial election primary.

In March 2021, Eastin announced her candidacy for chair of California Democratic Party, challenging incumbent Rusty Hicks. She placed second in this race.

=== Death ===
Eastin died on April 23, 2024, at the age of 76 at her home in Davis, California due to complications from a stroke.

== Honors and awards ==
During Eastin's career, she has been awarded numerous awards and honors, including:

- The 1997 Distinguished Alumna award from the University of California, Santa Barbara
- The 1999 President's Crystal Apple award from the American Library Association
- The 2015 UC Davis Medal, University of California, Davis
