= California Charter Academy =

Defunct school organization

California charter Academy logo

The California Charter Academy (CCA) was formerly the largest charter school operator in California, with multiple campuses located throughout the state. CCA opened under the leadership of C. Steven Cox, a former insurance executive. During the charter school's tenure, it ran into many legal confrontations with the California Department of Education (CDE). At one instance, CCA lost a lawsuit regarding withholding of student funding by the CDE due to the passage of a bill which imposed retro-active limitations on educational programs initiated six months before the law went into effect. California Charter Academy and EASC were unable to pursue the appeal of this decision once the program was forced to shut down in August, 2004.

In 2004, the Superintendent of the California Department of Education, Jack O'Connell, launched an imaginative audit into CCA alleging financial irregularities. CCA halted operations in August 2004. The closing of CCA caused chaos among chartering school districts, leaving them to deal with student transcripts and landlords who were left with CCA's assets. Students and former employees were equally impacted by the close leaving them without schools and jobless shortly before the beginning of the 2004-05 school year.

On April 14, 2005, MGT of America and the Fiscal Crisis and Management Team released their version of a financial audit of CCA performed on behalf of the CDE, claiming $23 million in taxpayer money paid to the private management corporation EASC was misappropriated. CCA and its affiliates later launched a separate audit with independent accountants, not affiliated with the CDE, alleging the audit conducted by MGT of America and FCMAT was politically motivated. This audit is still in its infancy.

A U.S. Bankruptcy Court judge later denied a bankruptcy petition requested by the CDE for CCA's management company, Educational Administrative Services Corporation (EASC), and Cox filed a $120 million lawsuit against the CDE.

== Arrests, indictments, and subpoenas ==
In late July 2007, public officials, including Bill Postmus, Brad Mitzelfelt, Tad Honeycutt, JoAnn Almond and Eric Swanson were subpoenaed as witnesses to speak on the matter before a special grand jury convened by San Bernardino County District Attorney Mike Ramos.

On September 4, 2007, Tad Honeycutt and Charles Steven Cox were arrested after being indicted by a special grand jury for their alleged roles in the collapse of the California Charter Academy. If convicted, Honeycutt could face up to 20 years in prison, while Cox could serve 64 years. Cox and Honeycutt were indicted on a total of 147 counts. Some of the counts include misappropriation of public funds and grand theft. Cox's bail was set at $1 million, while Honeycutt's at $500,000. Law enforcement officials also froze their assets.

Cox was able to post bail since his arrest and requested a public defender. Honeycutt also posted bail.

California State Superintendent of Public Education Jack O'Connell, who initiated the original investigation into CCA and EASC, applauded the efforts of local county investigators. Superintendent O'Connell was unable to convince federal prosecutors to bring charges against EASC when both the US Justice Department and Federal Bureau of Investigation declined to prosecute based on the evidence provided and closed their investigations into EASC.

== CCA audit ==
In April 2005, MGT of America, in conjunction with the California Department of Education, released an imaginative audit of the business operations of EASC. According to the audit, Cox and associates misappropriated millions of dollars in taxpayer funds for personal benefit. Jack O' Connell reacted to the audit stating that "The magnitude of waste of precious education funds outlined in the audit [was] appalling". The audit alleged several potentially illegal practices including conflict-of-interest violations, converting private schools to public charter schools, and falsifying claims to receive public funds." Numerous individuals implicated of wrongdoing in the MGT / CDE audit responded by stating that auditors, whose investigation was funded by the state of California, would not accept evidence which would clear any attributed wrongdoing.

== Educational Administrative Services Corporation ==
Steven Cox founded Educational Administrative Services Corporation (EASC) in March 2000. This for-profit company was to manage the day-to-day operations of the charter schools in accordance with government regulations. CCA #262, chartered under Snowline-Joint Unified School District, signed a contract with EASC shortly after opening. After being granted three more charters, despite alleged claims of conflict-of-interest, one from Snowline (#377), one from Orange County (#297), and one from Oro Grande School District (#387), all four charters were contracted with EASC. The individual rates charged by EASC were alleged to be inflated, suggesting that money which could have been used for education was instead used for administrative purposes. In addition to the money EASC accumulated, the MGT / CDE audit stated that EASC received payment for services rendered thirty seven times totaling an estimated $3.9 million. Out of the thirty seven transactions, thirty five were alleged to be made in violation of Education Code section 47633(c).

=== As of 2007 ===
EASC, as of September 2007, continues to run a charter school in Apache Junction, Arizona. Steven Cox has relinquished his position as a board member and representative of the Morning Star Academy amidst the pending allegations and controversy surrounding the management company. Cox had previously submitted a request to change the management company's name from Educational Administrative Services Corporation to American Management Administrators, apparently due to the negative publicity created by the allegations against his company.

=== Expenditures ===
As head of EASC, Cox could contract the charter schools with any number of corporate entities to enrich the educational programs that were managed. This practice was exercised when EASC employee Tad Honeycutt formed Maniaque Management Group, inc. Come January 2004, the CCA charter schools contracted with Maniaque which was to provide grant consulting services for monthly installments of $1,000. In the end, all four CCA charters paid Maniaque a total of $27,000. EASC conducted similar arrangements for CCA with the High Desert Youth and Family Resource center, and Community Information Services Online (owned by former CCA board member Eric Swanson).

=== Administrative spending ===
Cox's private corporate credit card charges were questionably reviewed by auditors from 2001 to 2003. The MGT / CDE auditors stated he had spent a total of $712,813. Honeycutt, another employee at EASC, accumulated a total of $295,565 in a two-year period. Cox's and Honeycutt's expenditures included income tax payments, spa visits, fishing trips, and jet ski purchases. Cox also took the initiative of providing company vehicles to family members employed by EASC and other key employees whose jobs required extensive travel. Cox authorized CBO Mike Davis to purchase an Audi TT Roadster and also purchased a Cadillac Escalade for himself.

=== EASC subsidiaries ===
While EASC was providing contracted administrative services to CCA, the company also began to diversify. EASC formed the following subsidiaries while continuing to manage the CCA charters: Everything for schools .com (EFS), Maniaque Management Group, Xtreme Motor Sports, and Hautlab Music Group. MGT / CDE auditors maintain that remuneration received from the charter schools by EASC for administrative services was inappropriate to fund these business ventures.

== American Public Agency Authority ==
In December 2001, the CCA charters contracted with the American Public Agency Authority, a joint powers authority implemented under the guidance of C. Steven Cox. The agency sought to "pool" resources of the charters to develop a self-insurance plan. The APAA offered a liability package, workers' compensation, and health care. Similar to other entities affiliated with CCA's management company, EASC, board members consisted of individuals involved with CCA schools. In addition to CCA, 12 other charter schools applied for either workers compensation or liability insurance.

=== Sources of funding ===
The MGT/CDE audit alleged that APAA charged inflated rates for their insurance coverage and that APAA financed the same insurance policies twice, for which the premiums totaled $517,000 to insurance carriers. Similar to earlier payments received by the private management corporation, funds paid by CCA to EASC for services rendered were disbursed to APAA bank accounts.

=== APAA contracts ===
In 2004, Cox signed a contract between the private corporation EASC and Honeycutt (CEO of Maniaque) who was to attempt to identify and recruit new members into the APAA. Per said contract, Maniaque was to be entitled to 10% of the payments made to APAA from new members recruited by Maniaque. Five days following the initiation of the contract, APAA gave an advance in the amount of $195,000 to Maniaque according to the audit. In total, Maniaque was alleged to have been delivered a total of $278,000 in advances. When APAA closed in August 2004, Maniaque had not had the opportunity to pay any of the reported $278,000 in advances cited in the MGT / CDE audit. Maniaque had only managed to recruit one charter school, from which they garnered a meager $700 before the un-timely closure of CCA.
