= 1968 United States Senate election in California =

- November 5, 1968
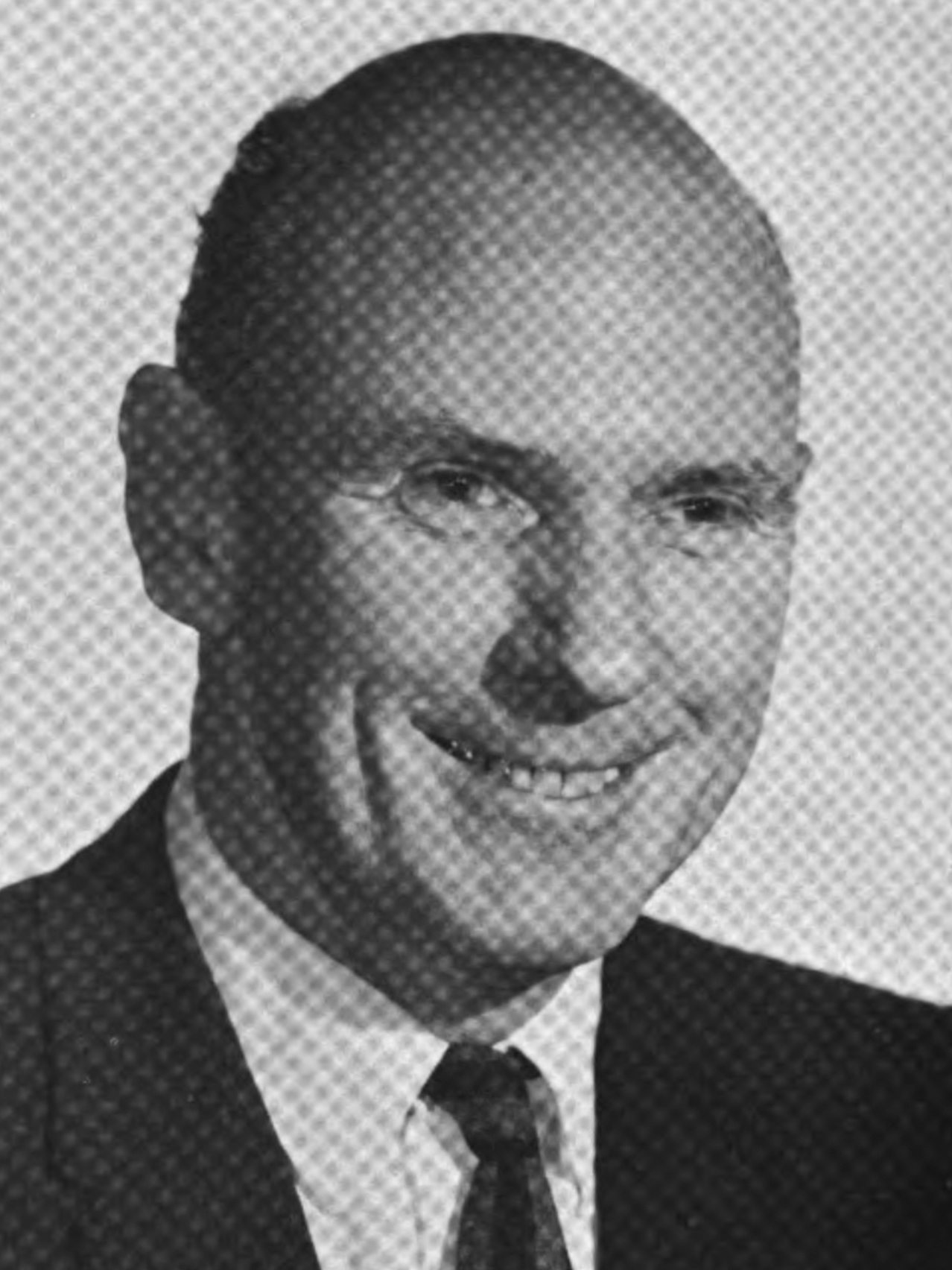

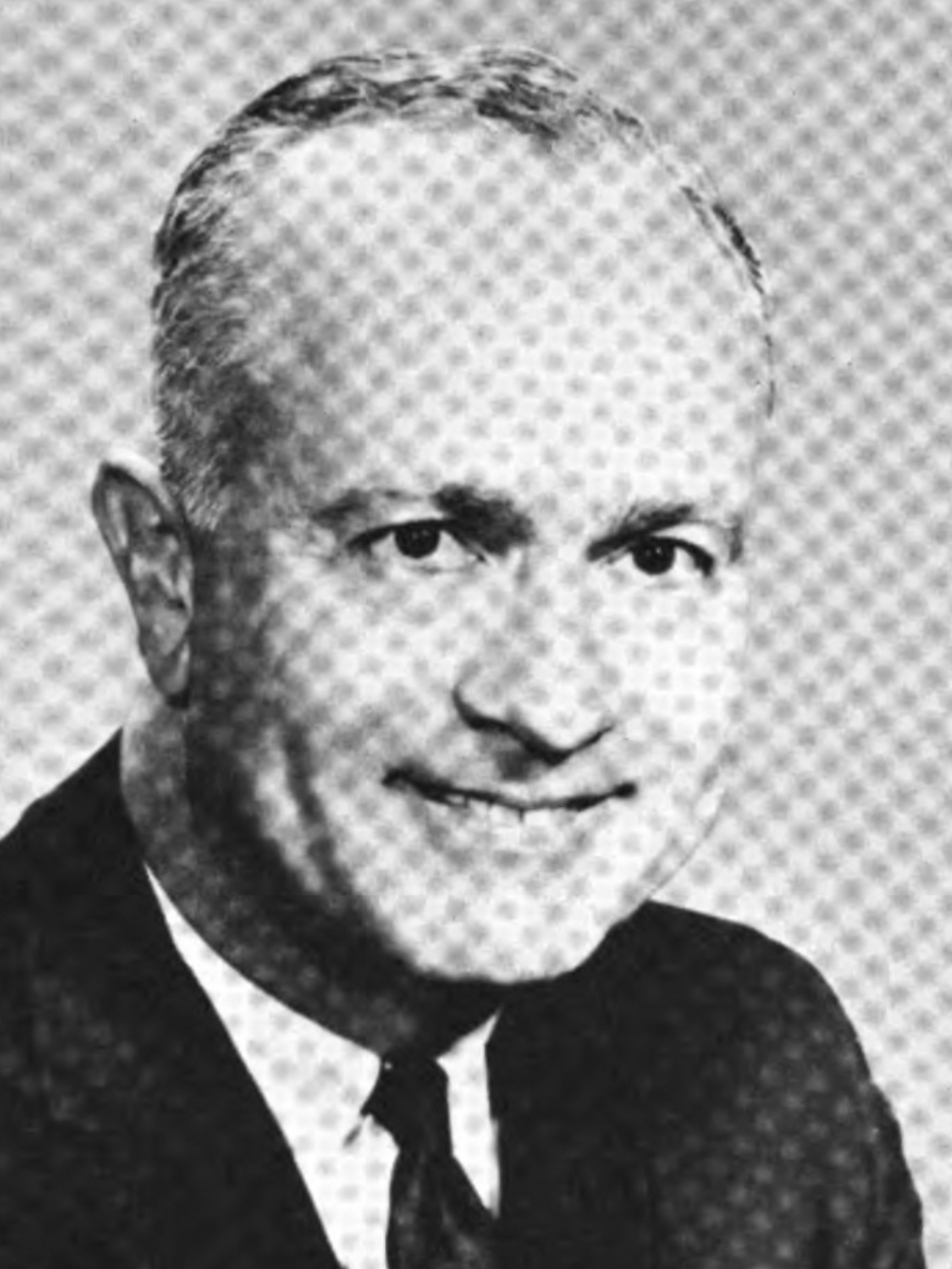
Nominee	Alan Cranston	Max Rafferty
Party	Democratic	Republican
Popular vote	3,680,352	3,329,148
Percentage	51.82%	46.87%
- County results Cranston: 40–50% 50–60% 60–70% Rafferty: 40–50% 50–60% 60–70%
U.S. senator before election
Thomas Kuchel
Republican
Elected U.S. senator
Alan Cranston
Democratic

The 1968 United States Senate election in California was held on November 5, 1968. Republican incumbent Thomas Kuchel ran for a fourth term in office but was defeated in the Republican primary by state superintendent of public instruction Max Rafferty. In the general election, Rafferty was defeated by former state controller Alan Cranston.

Primary elections were held on June 4. Rafferty defeated Kuchel by about three percent of the total vote, emphasizing his conservative positions against the more moderate incumbent. In the Democratic primary, Cranston easily defeated state senator Anthony Beilenson.

== Republican primary ==
=== Candidates ===
- Phil Cammack
- W. C. Jones
- Thomas Kuchel, incumbent U.S. senator since 1953 and assistant Senate minority leader
- Max Rafferty, state superintendent of public instruction since 1963
- James A. Ware, Los Angeles businessman and perennial candidate

=== Results ===
1968 Senate Republican primary
Party	Candidate	Votes	%
Republican	Max Rafferty	1,112,947	50.05%
Republican	Thomas Kuchel (incumbent)	1,043,315	46.92%
Republican	James A. Ware	28,311	1.27%
Republican	Phil Cammack	20,767	0.93%
Republican	W.C. Jones	18,442	0.83%
Total votes		2,223,782	100.00

== Democratic primary ==
=== Candidates ===
- Anthony Beilenson, state senator from Beverly Hills
- William M. Bennett, member of the California Public Utilities Commission
- Walter Buchanan, Venice teacher and perennial candidate
- Charles Crail
- Alan Cranston, former state controller

=== Results ===
Democratic primary results
Party	Candidate	Votes	%
Democratic	Alan Cranston	1,681,825	58.99%
Democratic	Anthony Beilenson	644,844	22.62%
Democratic	Walter R. Buchanan	227,798	7.99%
Democratic	William M. Bennett	207,720	7.29%
Democratic	Charles Crail	89,023	3.12%
Total votes		2,851,210	100.00

== General election ==
=== Candidates ===
- Alan Cranston, former state controller (Democratic)
- Paul Jacobs (Peace & Freedom)
- Max Rafferty, state superintendent of public instruction since 1963 (Republican)

=== Results ===
1968 United States Senate election in California
Party	Candidate	Votes	%	±%
Democratic	Alan Cranston	3,680,352	51.82%	▲8.38
Republican	Max Rafferty	3,329,148	46.87%	▼9.46
Peace and Freedom	Paul Jacobs	92,965	1.31%	N/A
Total votes		7,102,465	100.00%	
Democratic gain from Republican		Swing		
