= California Association of Student Councils =

US non-profit organization

California Association of Student Councils (CASC)
- Abbreviation: CASC
- Formation: 1947
- Legal status: 501(c)(3) non-profit
- Headquarters: Portola Valley, California
- Location: 3130 Alpine Road, Suite 288, Portola Valley, California 94028
- Region served: primarily California
- Executive Director: Kelly Wachowicz
- Board Chair: Maria Pappas
- State President: Euri Kim
- Affiliations: National Leadership Institute California Department of Education State Board of Education
- Staff: 4
- Volunteers: 500+
- Website: www.casc.net

The California Association of Student Councils (CASC) is a non-profit, student-led youth leadership and advocacy organization. Founded in 1947 by the California Department of Education and the Association of California School Administrators, CASC has provided a multitude of conferences to students, advisors, and professionals in both California and around the world.

== Overview ==
The California Association of Student Councils is a student training/mentoring leadership organization that also lobbies for youth-oriented legislation. It runs over sixty student leadership training events a year training students from elementary, middle, and high school students in leadership, collaboration, and team-building skills. Trainings are peer-to-peer, and thus a majority of the staff at conferences are students. Conferences are organized and facilitated primarily by student directors and staff.

In addition to leadership trainings, CASC serves as an advocate for youth in Sacramento, lobbying continuously through the year. CASC holds two conferences each year at which students create formal proposals to the California State Board of Education and the California State Senate or the California State Assembly Education Committees.

CASC works toward the principles on which it was founded in 1947: “to give students actual experiences and involvement in decision making and democratic experiences.” Their State Council Members, trainers, and alumni are consistently recognized for their professionalism, competence, and adaptability.

== Structure ==
=== State Council ===
The State Council consists of 25 California high school students, 2 who are elected and 23 who are appointed in the spring of each year to serve a one-year term. The State President and Vice President, who are the sole leads of the State Council, are elected by student delegates from across the state of California. This process used to be through an arduous two-day in-person campaigning process at the Youth Action Summit of California (YASC), but is now conducted online.

The State Council is divided into two branches known as the Executive Cabinet and State Cabinet. Each member retains full voting rights and is primarily responsible for promoting membership, developing annual plans, organizing and approving conferences/programs, setting program policies, proposing/approving structural changes, approving management training, and developing long-term plans.

=== Regions ===
There are 12 regions across California and each region has its respective president who appoints a cabinet composed of students (grades 9-12) from that region. The positions on each cabinet, include:

- Vice President
- Secretary/Treasurer
- Government Affairs and Policy Director
- Government Affairs and Policy Committee Member(s)
- Development Director
- Development Committee Member(s)
- Outreach Director
- Outreach Committee Member(s)
- Communications Director
- Clubs Director
- Clubs Committee Member(s)

=== Board of Directors ===
The Board of Directors is composed of ten adults and five students elected by the State Council. All members of the board share equal permissions and responsibilities.

=== Past leadership ===
State Council members have been historically recognized for their outstanding leadership, workplace competency, and career outcomes. Past state presidents include:

- 2025-26: Lawrence Kim, Harvard University - Class of 2030
- 2024-25: David Shijoon Bae, Harvard University - Class of 2029
- 2023-24: Kristie To, Cornell University - Class of 2028
- 2022-23: Ellie Lian, Pomona College - Class of 2027
- 2021-22: Mina Lee, Dickinson College - Class of 2026
- 2020-21: Elijah Tsai, William and Mary College - Class of 2025
- 2019-20: Avery Reed, Barnard College - Class of 2024
- 2018-19: Rachel Lu, Brown University - Class of 2023
- 2017-18: Mori Leveroni, Portland State University - Class of 2022
- 2016-17: Nandeeni Patel, Claremont McKenna College - Class of 2021
- 2015-16: Shawn Ahdout, Stanford University - Class of 2020
- 2014-15: Paige Amormino, Princeton University - Class of 2019
- 2013-14: Maggie Wang, Vanderbilt University - Class of 2018
- 2012-13: Raffi Margossian, UC Berkeley - Class of 2017
- 2011-12: Ronak Ahir, UC Berkeley - Class of 2016
- 2010-11: Janie Lee, Princeton University - Class of 2015
- 2009-10: Diana Li, Harvard University - Class of 2014
- 2008-09: Aaron Feuer, Yale University - Class of 2013

== CASC Programs ==
=== Summer Leadership Conferences ===
- High School
- Middle School

CASC summer leadership conferences bring together students and advisors at a multi-day training conference held at University of California, Santa Barbara. In the past, summer conferences have been conducted at college campuses such as the University of California, Berkeley, Stanford University, and Saint Mary's College of California. All of the curriculum is taught through hands-on activities in small groups led by high school and college students. Skills are taught in areas including.

- personal goal setting and time management
- project planning in a team setting
- working collaboratively and resolving conflicts
- presentation skills
- facilitative leadership and meeting skills

=== One-Day Leadership Workshops ===
- High School
- Middle School
- Elementary School

One-day workshops throughout the state focus on individual and group skill development. Working with trained high school and college students who serve as role models, students meet in small groups with peers from other local schools to practice meeting and presentation skills and to engage in collaborative problem solving exercises.

=== Staff Development Program ===
Students (sophomores and older) who have successfully completed the CASC basic high school summer leadership program become eligible to attend a three-day staff development program. Upon completing the training they may be recommended to serve as a trainer at any CASC conference. Additionally, selected college-age CASC trainers are invited to attend Advanced Skills Training. Trainers of trainers and international staff are selected from this group.

=== ASB Advisor Workshop ===
This two-day workshop focuses on the role of a Student Council/ASB, structure, selection and training of members, team-building techniques, evaluation of performance, coaching and feedback. Participants have an opportunity to share best practices as well as address current challenges.

=== Leadership Educators Workshop ===
This two-day program is focused on curriculum for training current and aspiring student leaders. Topics covered include: units of study, principles of design, integration of lessons with event planning, and grading. Participants develop skills in meeting planning and management, situational leadership, team development, and project planning. Time is allocated for exploring resources.

=== Student Advisory Board on Education (SABE) ===
At this multi day conference, students from all over the state learn about education policy and have an opportunity to influence it. The SABE conference has been held annually since 1966. SABE proposals are presented to the State Board of Education. SABE is run by the Education Policy Director

Additionally, delegates at the SABE conference elect the top six of twelve candidates for the student position on the State Board of Education. These six are then sent to the State Board to be narrowed down the top three.

=== Student Advisory Board on Legislation in Education (SABLE) ===
High school and middle school students throughout California gather in Sacramento to discuss educational issues of common concern and prepare proposals for the Assembly Education Committee and the Senate Education Committee. SABLE is run by the Education Policy Director on the State Council.It differs from SABE in that it is much more rigorous.

=== Student Board Member Symposiums ===
These one-day interactive workshops bring together serving and aspiring student board members together with adult board members and consultants. The program focuses on training in areas necessary for these students to serve effectively, including responsibilities and roles, best practices and techniques for surveying students.

=== Custom Designed Programs ===
CASC designs full school leadership and personal development programs, differentiated instruction opportunities, collaboration, conflict management training, meeting skills, workshops and team building for individual student councils, schools, districts, departments, and organizations. Custom Designed Programs are called Special Projects, and are run by the Special Projects Director.

== Accomplishments ==
(Taken from literature published by the California Association of Student Councils)

=== Schools ===
- In 1996 CASC facilitated establishment of the Westside Leadership Magnet School in the Los Angeles Unified School District. Currently, student leaders conduct classroom lessons in leadership three times a week for primary and elementary students.
- CASC trained peer mentors for the summer enrichment program for “at-risk” entering ninth graders in the Compass Program at Menlo-Atherton High School. The program serves as a catalyst for the development of class, club, and ASB leaders.
- CASC designed special workshops for Gifted and Talented students in the Mountain-View Whisman Elementary District and the Mt. Diablo School District.
- Over a four-year period, CASC conducted training for classes, the staff, and the entire student body at Menlo-Atherton High School. The result was a more unified and respectful student population.
- CASC, for many years, ran a school-wide team development workshop at Hillview Middle School for the entire eighth grade class.

=== Organization ===
- CASC provided small group facilitators for the Educational Planning Forum for the Sequoia Union High School District. Meeting skills training was also provided for parent groups.
- CASC designed leadership lessons and trained staff for Sacramento START that conducts after-school programs in 40 low-income elementary schools.
- CASC designed a project planning and personal development program for students enrolled in the Jefferson Awards program in the Bay Area.

=== National ===
- CASC leaders served as facilitators and recorders for small group sessions at the 2002 Family Re-Union Conference sponsored by Al and Tipper Gore at Vanderbilt University.
- An Executive Director served as the “architect for leadership development” for the American Society of Plastic Surgeons. CASC Trainers worked with the staff, board, and members to augment their leadership skills.
- in 1995, the Corporation for National Service selected CASC as one of three organizations to collaborate in designing and conducting training for national service executives.
- CASC youth leaders staffed the 1992 Earth Train project and conducted environmental student forums in Los Angeles, San Francisco, Denver, Chicago, New York, DC and met with United Nations and Congressional leaders.

=== International ===
- In 1987 CASC student leaders worked with Russian and Finnish counterparts to develop an Agenda for the 21st Century. The document was presented directly to Presidents Mikhail Gorbachev and Ronald Reagan and led to the first youth exchange program between the U.S. and Soviet Union.
- CASC training and support led to the founding of the Association of Young Leaders (AYL), the third non-profit organization formed in the newly independent former Soviet states in 1992.
- CASC youth staffed three Global Youth Conferences, the 1992 Earth Summit, the 1995 and 1996 State of the World Forums.
- In 2004 CASC and AYL staff trained Japanese youth to serve as facilitators for an environmental forum in Aomori, Japan.
