= California State Board of Education =

Education governing body in California, US

The California State Board of Education (SBE) is the governing and policy-making body of the California Department of Education. The State Board of Education was established by statute in 1852, then later amended into the California Constitution in 1884. The State Board of Education sets K-12 education policy in the areas of standards, instructional materials, assessment, and accountability. The State Board of Education adopts textbooks for grades K-8, adopts regulations to implement legislation, and has authority to grant waivers of the Education Code. Content standards are designed to encourage the highest achievement of every student, by defining the knowledge, concepts, and skills that students should acquire at each grade level. These standards include English Language Arts, Mathematics, Career Technical Education, Computer Science, and more.

== Board Members ==
California's State Board of Education consists of eleven members, including one student member, who are appointed by the governor of California and approved by the senate. Members of the board have a term limit of four years, while student board members are limited to one term year. To select the student member, the current Board nominates three students to be selected from by the Student Advisory Board on Education, a conference run by the California Association of Student Councils.

== Responsibilities ==
The State Board of Education has been responsible for the maintenance of programs such as the No Child Left Behind Act of 2001 (Discontinued 2017), the administration of the Standardized Testing and Reporting (Discontinued 2017) program (used for student and school accountability), and the Academic Performance Index (Discontinued 2018), which measured the academic performance and growth of schools based on standardized test scores.

The formal state constitutional duties of the State Board of Education include the appointment of one deputy and three associate superintendents to the California Department of Education, upon nomination by the state superintendent of public instruction; and the adoption of textbooks for use in grades one through eight. By statute, the State Board of Education is the governing and policy-making body of California's K-12 education system.

Additionally, the State Board of Education is authorized by state law to study and plan for the improvement of California's educational conditions. The State Board of Education can plan for and study the improvement on the administration and efficiency of California public schools.

== Committees ==
Various commissions, committees, and advisory boards are established, chartered under, and administered by the State Board of Education. These include the Advisory Commission on Charter Schools, the Advisory Commission on Special Education, the California Practitioners Advisory Group, the California Workforce Pathways Committee, and the Instructional Quality Commission.

The Instructional Quality Commission advises the State Board on the adoption or rejection of new curriculum standards. The Commission on Charter Schools helps administer the State Board's oversight of California charter schools. The Commission on Special Education provides advice to the Governor, the State Superintendent, the State Legislature, and the State Board of Education on continuing or new areas of research, program development, and evaluation in California special education. The California Practitioners Advisory Group strives to create a single, coherent accountability system for California public education that complies with federal, state, and local standards. The California Workforce Pathways Committee aims to build and further California's policy objectives on workforce development, particularly as it relates to career technical education.

== Significance ==
The California State Board of Education plays a critical role in the governance of California's public education system. Unlike many States, California's K-12 education system is highly segmented, with oversight and policy authority split between the State Board, the Department of Education, the Legislature, the Governor, and 1000+ school districts across California. The State Board of Education strives for policy uniformity across California's vast public education system.

== See also ==
- History of education in California
- California State Superintendent of Public Instruction
- California Charter Academy
