= Max Rafferty =

American writer, educator, and politician (1917–1982)

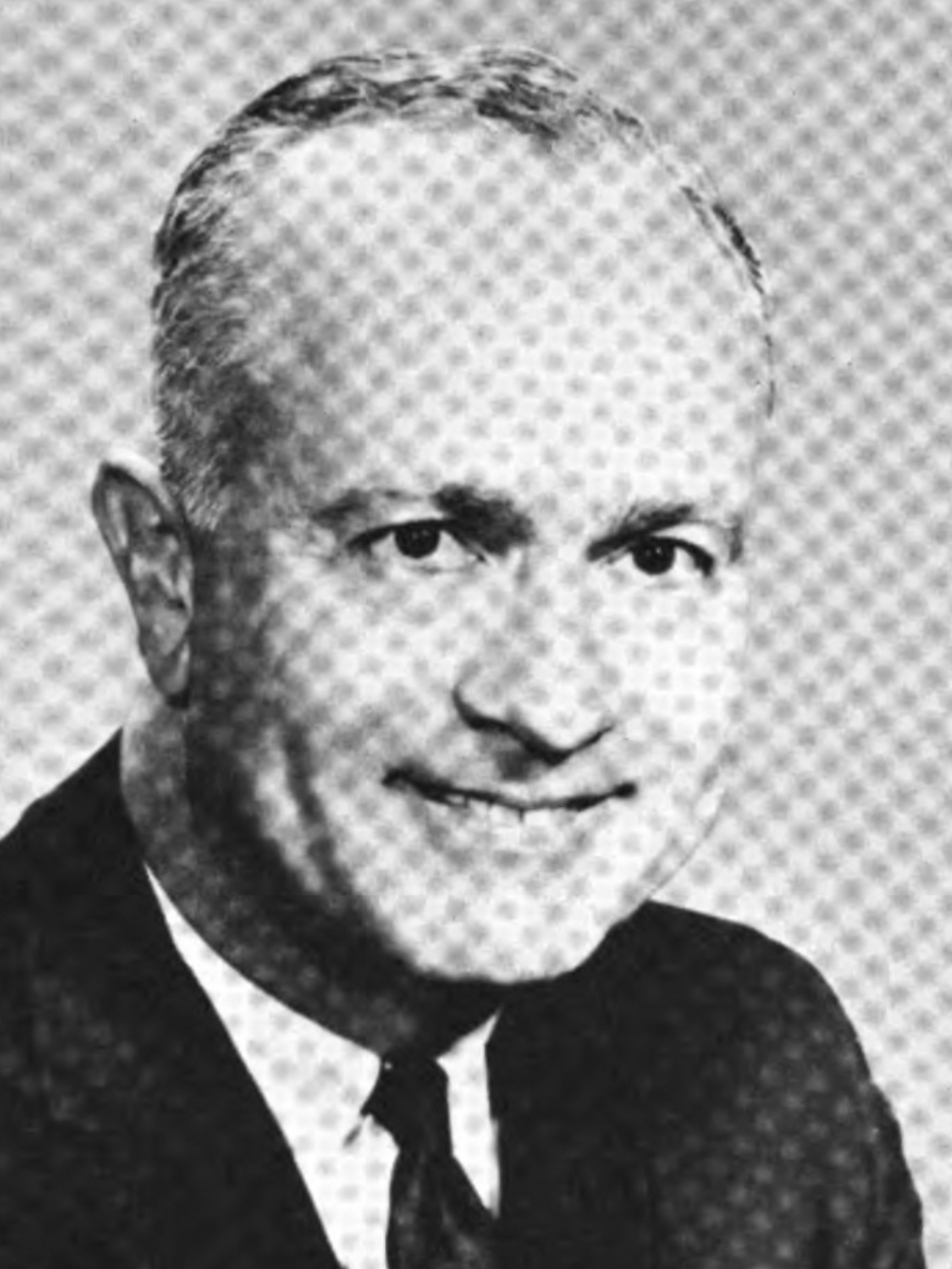
- Official portrait, 1967

22nd California State Superintendent of Public Instruction
- In office January 7, 1963 – January 4, 1971
- Governor: Pat Brown; Ronald Reagan
- Preceded by: Roy E. Simpson
- Succeeded by: Wilson Riles

Personal details
- Born: Maxwell Lewis Rafferty Jr. May 7, 1917 New Orleans, Louisiana, U.S.
- Died: June 13, 1982 (aged 65) Pike County, Alabama, U.S.
- Party: Republican
- Spouse: Frances Longman Rafferty (m. 1944)
- Relations: Frances Rafferty (sister)
- Children: 3
- Profession: Author and educator

Maxwell Lewis Rafferty Jr. (May 7, 1917 – June 13, 1982) was an American writer, educator, and politician. The author of several best-selling books about education, Rafferty served two terms as California State Superintendent of Public Instruction from 1963 to 1971 under Governors Pat Brown and later eventual future US President Ronald Reagan and ran unsuccessfully in 1968 for the U.S. Senate as the Republican nominee, losing to Democratic former State Controller Alan Cranston. To date, Rafferty is the last Republican to have served as California State Superintendent of Public Instruction.

A staunch conservative, Rafferty was described by The New York Times as an "outspoken antiprogressive educator", and was one of the most divisive politicians of his time.

== Family ==
Rafferty was born to Maxwell Rafferty Sr. (1886–1967), and the former DeEtta Frances Cox (c. 1892–1972) in New Orleans, Louisiana, one of two children. His younger sibling was actress Frances Rafferty, a co-star of the 1954-1959 CBS Television sitcom, December Bride.

Max Rafferty spent most of his childhood in Sioux City, Iowa, where his sister was born in 1922. The family relocated to California in 1931. In 1944, he married Frances Longman, and the couple had three children: Kathleen, Dennis, and Eileen.

== Education ==
Rafferty graduated in 1933 from Beverly Hills High School. He earned his Bachelor of Arts (1938) and Master of Arts (1949) from the University of California, Los Angeles. He earned his Ed.D. (1955) from the University of Southern California. While attending UCLA, he was a member, and president, of the Sigma Pi fraternity chapter.

As an undergraduate at UCLA, Rafferty "took umbrage at many of the things" in the college newspaper, the Daily Bruin, "particularly the editorial page ... to the point of charging into the office and physically attacking me", recalled editor Stanley Rubin in 1970.

In 1937, Rafferty wrote a letter to the Los Angeles Times in which he described The Bruin as "one of the most prejudiced newspapers on the Pacific Coast" and complained that its "radicalism is not so funny if it keeps you from getting a job."

== Career ==
Rafferty's first job, during World War II, was as a classroom teacher in the Trona Unified School District in the Mojave Desert portion of San Bernardino County, California. In his newspaper columns, Rafferty often remarked with nostalgia how his first teaching jobs in California had been the most satisfying ones of his career.

After World War II, Rafferty became vice-principal, principal, and school superintendent in various California school districts, including Big Bear High School in Big Bear Lake from 1948 to 1951. He was the superintendent at Saticoy (1951–55), Needles (1955–61), and La Cañada, a prosperous northeast Los Angeles suburb (1961–62).

In 1962, he was elected to the nonpartisan office of California education superintendent, defeating Los Angeles school board president Ralph Richardson. He held the office for two terms, from 1963 to 1971.

In 1968, Rafferty challenged and defeated incumbent Republican Senator Thomas H. Kuchel in the Republican primary election in what has been described as "one of the biggest primary upsets in Senate history."

Rafferty ran as a conservative while Kuchel was a moderate. A series of newspaper articles by David Shaw reported that Rafferty had been less than eager to serve his country during World War II after being classified 1A: fit for military service. Rafferty, Shaw reported, twice appealed the classification and was reclassified 4F—physically, mentally or morally unfit for service—because of what Rafferty said was a case of "flat feet". "The standing joke in the town", Shaw wrote, referring to the Mojave Desert community of Trona where Rafferty spent much of the war years as a teacher, "is still 'Max Rafferty celebrated V-J Day by throwing his cane away'." The stories damaged Rafferty and he lost the Senate election to Cranston, the former state controller.

Two years later, in 1970, Rafferty failed in his bid for a third term as Superintendent of Public Instruction, losing to Wilson Riles, the first African-American to be elected to statewide office in California and a Democrat in the nonpartisan race.

He then moved to Alabama to serve on the faculty at Troy University in Troy, serving as Dean of Education from 1971 to 1981, and as Sorrell Chairman of Education from 1981 until his death in 1982. Shortly before his death, he was appointed by President Ronald Reagan to a national advisory board on the financing of elementary and secondary education.

Rafferty was the author of several books on educational philosophy, including Practice and Trends in School Administration (1961), Suffer, Little Children (1962), What They Are Doing to Your Children (1964), and Max Rafferty on Education (1968). His newspaper column, "Dr. Max Rafferty", was syndicated nationally. He also received the George Washington Honor Medal from the Freedoms Foundation.

== Views ==
Rafferty was described by The New York Times as an "outspoken antiprogressive educator" who "built a national reputation attacking busing, sex education and the 'New Left'."

His books Suffer, Little Children and What They Are Doing to Your Children attacked progressive education and urged a "return to the fundamentals" in education. In particular, he wanted schools to focus on phonics, memorization, and drill; use American history and children's classics in teaching from the early grades forward; and drop psychology and "life adjustment" approaches from education. Among his controversial actions as state schools superintendent was his attempt to stop schools and classrooms from using books that he considered obscene, such as Eldridge Cleaver's Soul on Ice and Leroi Jones's Dutchman. He threatened to revoke the teaching certificate of any teacher who used such works. He attempted to get the Dictionary of American Slang removed from school libraries. Rafferty has also espoused hero-worship of the founding fathers in history classes saying “Dwelling on their human faults distorts the overall picture.” Holding the image of the founding fathers even above objectivity:

"Balancing virtues with vices, belittling the heroes, dwelling unduly upon the scandals of the past—these are the techniques that produce in the minds of the children a balanced, bland, tasteless, lifeless image of the country, and all in the sacred name of objectivity."

Politically, he was known as an "articulate spokesman for the far right" who had a "nationwide reputation as a Fourth-of-July style orator and writer." In 1968, while running for the Senate, Rafferty said that those caught in looting should be shot.

He urged quick, stiff punishment for crimes: "Retribution is what I'm talking about, friends, and ever since we crawled out of caves, retribution has followed wrongdoing as the night does the day." He promised never to vote for higher taxes or for foreign aid to "dictators who hate us," and he criticized judges who "coddle criminals," saying he could not have voted to confirm any of the then Supreme Court Justices.

In 1972, he campaigned for and served as a stand-in speaker for Alabama Governor George Wallace during the latter's Democratic campaign for U.S. president.

== Death ==
Rafferty was active in the Lions Club and Rotary International. He died on June 13, 1982, at age 65 when his car plunged off an earthen dam into a pond near Troy, Pike County, Alabama.

His papers were donated to the Special Collections Department of the University of Iowa Libraries in Iowa City.

Party political offices
| Preceded by Thomas Kuchel | Republican Party nominee for United States Senator from California (Class 3); 1968 | Succeeded by H. L. Richardson |
