= John Briggs (politician) =

American politician (1930–2020)

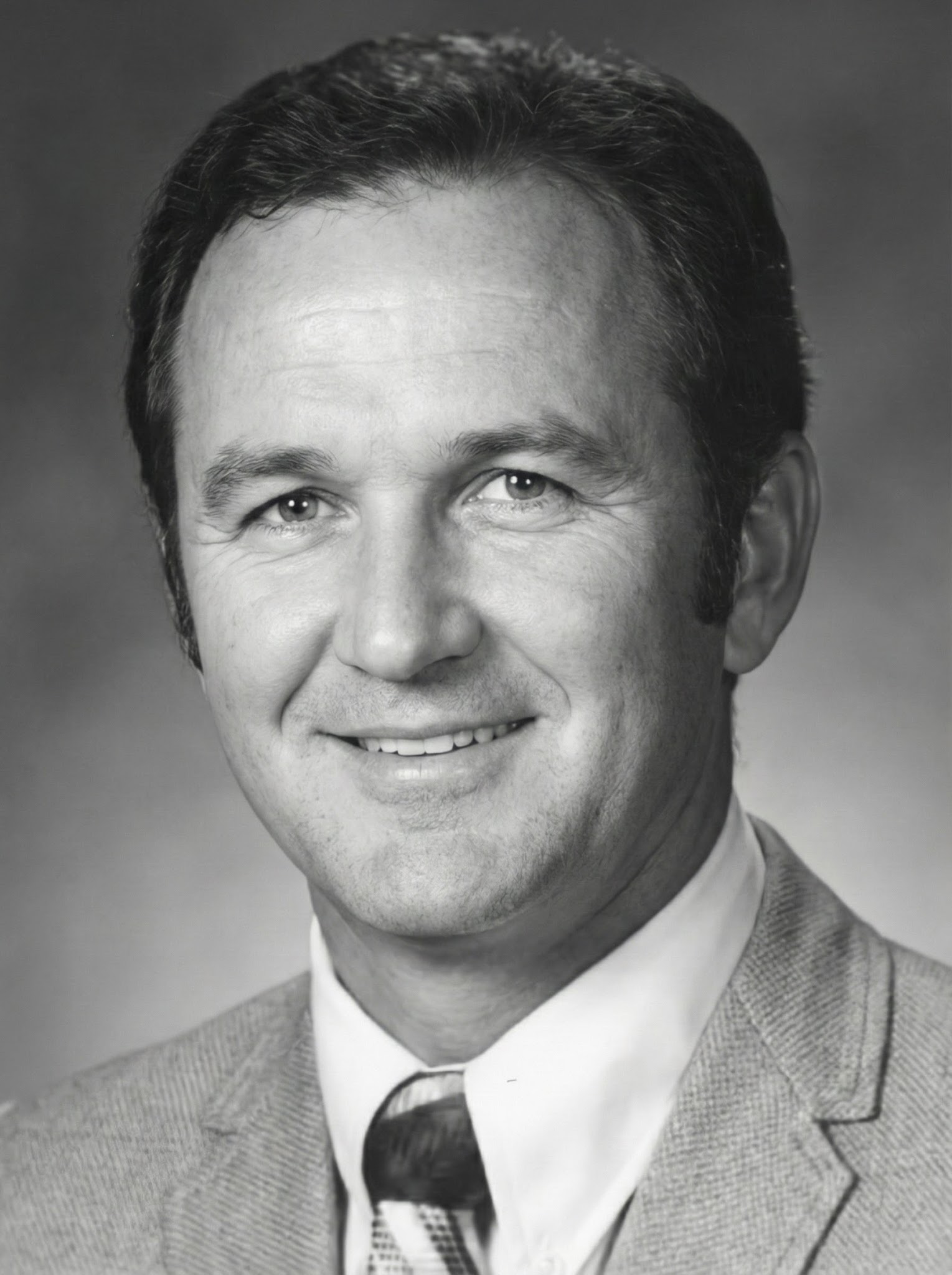
- Official portrait, 1975

Member of the California Senate from the 35th district
- In office December 6, 1976 – December 28, 1981
- Preceded by: James Edward Whetmore
- Succeeded by: John F. Seymour

Member of the California State Assembly from the 69th district
- In office December 2, 1974 – November 30, 1976
- Preceded by: Kenneth Cory
- Succeeded by: William E. Dannemeyer

Member of the California State Assembly from the 35th district
- In office January 2, 1967 – November 30, 1974
- Preceded by: Gordon W. Duffy
- Succeeded by: Gary K. Hart

Personal details
- Born: March 8, 1930 Mitchell, South Dakota, U.S.
- Died: April 15, 2020 (aged 90) Placerville, California, U.S.
- Party: Republican
- Spouse: Carmen Nicasio Briggs
- Children: 3
- Profession: Politician, United States Air Force Pilot

Military service
- Branch/service: United States Air Force
- Battles/wars: Korean War

John Vern Briggs (March 8, 1930 – April 15, 2020) was an American politician in the state of California. A Republican, he served in the California State Assembly and the California State Senate. He is perhaps best known for sponsoring Proposition 6 in 1978, also known as the Briggs Initiative, a failed measure which attempted to remove all gay or lesbian school employees or their supporters from their jobs.

== Personal life ==
Briggs was born in Alpena, South Dakota in 1930 and moved to southern California in 1935, where his single mother struggled to provide a stable home causing Briggs to be sent to foster care for a two-year period. He attended Fullerton Union High School and later served in the United States Air Force (1947–51) rising to the rank of Technical Sergeant, seeing action in the Korean Theater. After his stint in the Air Force, Briggs served in the United States Naval Reserve. Near the end of his military service, Briggs met Carmen Nicasio, at a USO dance. They married in December 1951 and moved to Fullerton, California where Briggs enrolled and graduated from Long Beach State College while working night shifts at Delco Remy Battery plant. Together, they had three children (Kathy Bailey, Dan Briggs and retired El Dorado County Supervisor Ron Briggs) and had eight grandchildren and eight great-grandchildren.

Briggs began his insurance career as a salesman, and then started his own successful insurance brokerage firm. In 1966 Briggs was elected to the California state assembly representing North Orange County. In June 1973, Briggs was selected by his alma mater California State University Long Beach as Outstanding Alumnus. In 1976 he was elected to the state senate serving 5 years before resigning in 1981, citing financial needs. He began a successful 14-year career as a lobbyist representing heavy equipment contractors, drunk driver's treatment schools, minority owned business associations, among others.

Throughout the years, Briggs remained active in a variety of community groups, including the Jaycees, the Rotary Club, and the Boys and Girls Club. He died on April 15, 2020, at the age of 90.

== Political career ==
Briggs' political career began as an outgrowth of his participation in the Jaycees. He served as a local Jaycee president and California State Director as well as President of the Senior Chamber of Commerce. He also served as President of the Walter Knott Young Republican Club. In 1962 and 1964, Briggs ran unsuccessfully as the Republican nominee for the California State Assembly in the 69th District (which includes parts of Orange County). He was elected two years later in the 35th District which included northern Orange County and neighboring parts of San Bernardino County. Re-elected three times in this district, Briggs went on to successfully compete in the 69th District in the 1974 election.

In 1976, Briggs ran for, and was elected a member of the California State Senate, representing the 35th District, comprising most of Orange County. He unsuccessfully sought the 1978 Republican nomination for governor. Re-elected in 1978 and 1980, Briggs resigned from the Senate at the end of December 1981.

While in office, Briggs concentrated much of his attention on insurance reform, a wider application of the death penalty, nuclear energy development, and construction regulation. He was member of the Western Interstate Nuclear Board from 1971 to 1972. In the Assembly, he chaired the Agriculture and the Atomic Development Committees; and while in the Senate chaired the Governmental Efficiency and Governmental Investigations and Reports Committees. In 1972 Briggs authored the state's first indoor clean air act (no smoking). He was responsible, with others, for the creation and funding of Chino Hills State Park and was instrumental in creating Caltrans District 11. For years Orange County was part of the Los Angeles Caltrans district creating a funding disparity. Briggs' action continues to bring Orange County billions in road funding.

Briggs was the proponent in several legislative initiatives in California, including:

- Proposition 6 (1978): (Failed) Would have required the firing of any teacher who was found to be "advocating, imposing, encouraging or promoting" homosexual activity;
- Proposition 13: Restricted property tax to 1% of the full cash value of the property;
- Proposition 7: Expanded the application of the death penalty and life imprisonment without parole;
- California Indoor Safe Air Act: Banned smoking in public buildings.

== Proposition 6 ==
Briggs sponsored the 1978 initiative known as Proposition 6 or the Briggs Initiative that would have prevented gays or those who supported gay rights from working in public schools. Of gay teachers, he said, "Most of them are in the closet, and frankly, that's where I think they should remain."

Former California governor Ronald Reagan spoke out publicly against the Briggs Initiative, stating that "there are enough laws that protect children". In a November 1, 1978, editorial in the Los Angeles Herald-Examiner, Reagan wrote, "Whatever else it is, homosexuality is not a contagious disease like measles. Prevailing scientific opinion is that an individual's sexuality is determined at a very early age and that a child's teachers do not really influence this." California Governor Jerry Brown denounced Proposition 6, as did U.S. President Jimmy Carter. The Log Cabin Republicans, a national organization of gay Republicans, subsequently credited Proposition 6 as being the catalyst leading to its formation. Opposition by leading politicians combined with grassroots lobbying led to the defeat of Proposition 6 by 58.4% to 41.6%.

== Post-political life ==
Following his retirement from politics, Briggs operated a successful political and business consulting firm for fifteen years. He was a registered California lobbyist from 1983 to 1996.

Briggs and his wife moved to Sun City Anthem in 2003, an age-restricted community in Nevada where he ran for the community's board of directors. In a campaign statement in 2008 published on the resident created blog, The Anthem Voice, Briggs denied statements made about him in various blogs, and said that he was not an "intolerant person." He stated that he continued to regard singer Anita Bryant (a vocal opponent of gay rights measures in the late 1970s) as "a hero," but he also said that, "with the passage of over thirty years, America has changed — including me." He said that, when he worked with Bryant, he and his wife "not only stood for our principles, but fought for principles as we then saw them." But he also said that the 1970s and 1980s were "a much different America," in which "President Reagan and the country shamefully neglected the AIDS epidemic causing the deaths of thousands." He said that, "like President Reagan, and most of the country, I think differently now, and have put aside the '70s and '80s, and respectfully request others do as well and move on to the civil side of life." He also stated that he was, despite his differences with them, friendly with Harvey Milk and gay activist Randy Shilts.

California Assembly
Preceded by Gordon W. Duffy	California State Assemblyman, 35th District; January 2, 1967-November 30, 1974	Succeeded by Gary K. Hart
Preceded by Kenneth Cory	California State Assemblyman, 69th District; December 2, 1974-November 30, 1976	Succeeded by William E. Dannemeyer
California Senate
Preceded by James Edward Whetmore	California State Senator, 35th District; December 6, 1976-December 28, 1981	Succeeded by John F. Seymour
