= California's 18th senatorial district =

American legislative district

California's 18th State Senate district
Current senator
Steve Padilla; D–Chula Vista
- Population (2010) • Voting age • Citizen voting age: 928,725; 699,815; 471,813
- Demographics: 29.05% White; 4.23% Black; 56.53% Latino; 8.93% Asian; 0.32% Native American; 0.15% Hawaiian/Pacific Islander; 0.35% other; 0.44% remainder of multiracial
- Registered voters: 503,382
- Registration: 53.43% Democratic; 13.75% Republican; 27.24% No party preference

California's 18th senatorial district is one of 40 California State Senate districts. It is currently represented by Democrat Steve Padilla of Chula Vista.

== District profile ==
The district stretches along the Mexico–United States border and predominantly includes rural Imperial Valley and areas of California along the Colorado River, including Needles, Blythe, and Indio. However, most of the district's population is in southern San Diego County, including Imperial Beach, Otay Mesa, Chula Vista, National City, Lincoln Acres, Bonita, the Tijuana River Valley, and the southeastern side of San Diego.

== Election results from statewide races ==
Year	Office	Results
2021	Recall	No 75.2 – 24.8%
2020	President	Biden 73.7 – 24.3%
2018	Governor	Newsom 76.5 – 23.5%
2018	Senator	Feinstein 57.9 – 42.1%
2016	President	Clinton 75.9 – 18.8%
2016	Senator	Harris 59.5 – 40.5%
2014	Governor	Brown 71.6 – 28.4%
2012	President	Obama 73.9 – 23.5%
2012	Senator	Feinstein 75.3 – 24.7%

== List of senators representing the district ==
Due to redistricting, the 18th district has been moved around different parts of the state. The current iteration resulted from the 2021 redistricting by the California Citizens Redistricting Commission.

Senators	Party	Years served	Counties represented	Notes
Frederick Cox	Democratic	January 8, 1883 – January 3, 1887	Sacramento	Cox and Routier served together.
Joseph Routier	Republican	January 8, 1883 – January 3, 1887	Sacramento	Cox and Routier served together.
M. W. Dixon	Democratic	January 3, 1887 – January 5, 1891	Alameda	
William Simpson	Republican	January 5, 1891 – January 7, 1895	Alameda	
Hugh Toner	Democratic	January 7, 1895 – January 2, 1899	San Francisco	
John A. Hoey	Republican	January 2, 1899 – January 5, 1903	San Francisco	
Harry Bunkers	Democratic	January 5, 1903 – February 27, 1905	San Francisco	Expelled from the Senate for bribery.
Vacant		February 27, 1905 – January 7, 1907	San Francisco	
Daniel J. Reily	Republican	January 7, 1907 – January 2, 1911	San Francisco	
Daniel P. Regan	Republican	January 2, 1911 – January 4, 1915	San Francisco	
Dominic Joseph Beban	Progressive	January 4, 1915 – February 29, 1916	San Francisco	Died in office.
Vacant		February 29, 1916 – January 8, 1917	San Francisco	
Victor J. Canepa	Independent	January 8, 1917 – January 5, 1931	San Francisco	Change his party to Republican when he ran for his 2nd term.
Victor J. Canepa	Republican	January 8, 1917 – January 5, 1931		Change his party to Republican when he ran for his 2nd term.
Herbert C. Jones	Republican	January 5, 1931 – January 7, 1935	Santa Clara	
Sanborn Young	Republican	January 7, 1935 – January 2, 1939	Santa Clara	
John D. Foley	Democratic	January 2, 1939 – January 4, 1943	Santa Clara	
Byrl R. Salsman	Republican	January 4, 1943 – October 1, 1949	Santa Clara	Resigned from the State Senate to become a Judge.
Vacant		October 1, 1949 – January 8, 1951	Santa Clara	
John F. "Jack" Thompson	Republican	January 8, 1951 – January 7, 1963	Santa Clara	
Clark L. Bradley	Republican	January 7, 1963 – January 2, 1967	Santa Clara	
Walter W. Stiern	Democratic	January 2, 1967 – November 30, 1974	Kern, Kings	
Omer Rains	Democratic	December 2, 1974 – November 30, 1982	Santa Barbara, Ventura	
Gary K. Hart	Democratic	December 6, 1982 – November 30, 1994	Los Angeles, Santa Barbara, Ventura	
Jack O'Connell	Democratic	December 5, 1994 – November 30, 2002	San Luis Obispo, Santa Barbara, Ventura	
Roy Ashburn	Republican	December 2, 2002 – November 30, 2010	Inyo, Kern, San Bernardino, Tulare	
Jean Fuller	Republican	December 6, 2010 – November 30, 2014	Inyo, Kern, San Bernardino, Tulare	
Robert Hertzberg	Democratic	December 1, 2014 – November 30, 2022	Los Angeles	
Steve Padilla	Democratic	December 5, 2022 – present	Imperial, Riverside, San Bernardino, San Diego	

== Election results (1990-present) ==
=== 2022 ===
2022 California State Senate 18th district election
Primary election
Party	Candidate	Votes	%
Democratic	Steve Padilla	74,495	61.0
Republican	Alejandro Galicia	47,689	39.0
Total votes		122,184	100.0
General election
Democratic	Steve Padilla	115,103	59.8
Republican	Alejandro Galicia	77,223	40.2
Total votes		192,326	100.0
Democratic hold			

=== 2018 ===
2018 California State Senate 18th district
Primary election
Party	Candidate	Votes	%
Democratic	Robert Hertzberg (incumbent)	72,462	66.3
Republican	Rudy Melendez	12,564	11.5
Democratic	Roger James Sayegh	12,238	11.2
Republican	Brandon Saario	12,048	11.0
Total votes		109,312	100.0
General election
Democratic	Robert Hertzberg (incumbent)	195,623	78.1
Republican	Rudy Melendez	54,888	21.9
Total votes		250,511	100.0
Democratic hold			

=== 2014 ===
2014 California State Senate 18th district
Primary election
Party	Candidate	Votes	%
Democratic	Robert Hertzberg	35,338	63.1
Republican	Ricardo Antonio Benitez	16,289	29.1
Green	John P. "Jack" Lindblad	4,392	7.8
Total votes		56,019	100.0
General election
Democratic	Robert Hertzberg	79,495	70.2
Republican	Ricardo Antonio Benitez	33,794	29.8
Total votes		113,289	100.0
Democratic gain from Republican			

=== 2010 ===
2010 California State Senate 18th district
Party	Candidate	Votes	%
Republican	Jean Fuller	166,051	68.9
Democratic	Carter N. Pope	75,229	31.1
Total votes		241,280	100.0
Republican hold			

=== 2006 ===
2006 California State Senate 18th district
Party	Candidate	Votes	%
Republican	Roy Ashburn (incumbent)	147,767	69.7
Democratic	Fred Davis	59,187	27.9
Green	Matthew Rick	4,923	2.3
Total votes		211,877	100.0
Republican hold			

=== 2002 ===
2002 California State Senate 18th district
Party	Candidate	Votes	%
Republican	Roy Ashburn (incumbent)	153,878	100.0
Total votes		153,878	100.0
Republican gain from Democratic			

=== 1998 ===
1998 California State Senate 18th district
Party	Candidate	Votes	%
Democratic	Jack O'Connell (incumbent)	169,818	66.9
Republican	Gordon Klemm	79,872	31.4
Libertarian	Jack Ray	4,276	1.7
Total votes		253,966	100.0
Democratic hold			

=== 1994 ===
1994 California State Senate 18th district
Party	Candidate	Votes	%
Democratic	Jack O'Connell	158,161	59.0
Republican	Steve MacElvaine	109,734	41.0
Total votes		267,895	100.0
Democratic hold			

=== 1990 ===
1990 California State Senate 18th district
Party	Candidate	Votes	%
Democratic	Gary K. Hart (incumbent)	111,599	60.4
Republican	Carey Rogers	65,499	35.4
Libertarian	Jay C. Wood	7,796	4.2
Total votes		184,894	100.0
Democratic hold			

== See also ==
- California State Senate
- California State Senate districts
- Districts in California
