= Omer Rains =

American politician (born 1941)

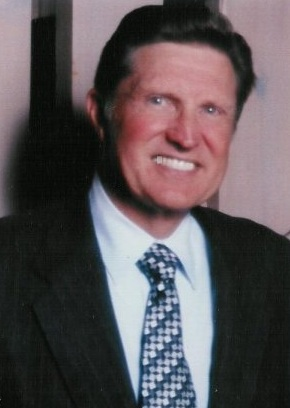

Member of the California Senate from the 18th district
- In office December 2, 1974 – November 30, 1982
- Preceded by: Robert J. Lagomarsino
- Succeeded by: Gary K. Hart

Member of the California Senate from the 24th district
- In office July 9, 1974 – November 30, 1974
- Preceded by: Robert J. Lagomarsino
- Succeeded by: Alex P. Garcia

Personal details
- Born: September 25, 1941 (age 85) Barnett, Missouri, U.S.
- Party: Democratic
- Spouse: Diana Waldie Rains (m. 1977)
- Children: 3
- Education: University of California, Berkeley
- Website: www.senorains.com

Omer Leonard Rains (born September 25, 1941) is an American politician, lawyer, author, ecologist, and humanitarian. He served in the California State Senate from 1974 to 1982.

== Introduction ==
Elected to the California Senate as a Democrat in 1974, Rains served three terms prior to running for the Office of Attorney General of California. His Senate district included over a million constituents in the Central Coast area of California between Los Angeles and San Francisco, including, but not limited to, the Counties of Ventura, Santa Barbara and Northern Los Angeles. Rains served as Chairman of the Senate Majority Caucus (the youngest in State history), as Chairman of the Senate Committee on Political Reform, and as Chairman of the Senate Judiciary Committee. At the time, Rains also was serving in numerous other legislative positions.

Rains is recognized as one of the nation's leading environmentalists and in the California Legislature he was the principal architect of California's container deposit legislation (commonly known as the "Bottle Bill"). Rains also served as Chairperson of the Joint Legislative Committee on Legal Equality, the only Legislative Committee in the United States established to deal solely with promoting the rights of women.

As stated by a former U.S. presidential candidate John Hagelin "Omer Rains ... has left us with a legacy of legislative and humanitarian achievements that few of his generation can match.

== Early life and education ==
Although Rains was born in a small town in Missouri, he moved to California with his family at a young age. After graduating from Bakersfield High School in 1959, he entered the University of California, Berkeley. Rains received a B.A. in political science, and a J.D. from the University of California, Berkeley School of Law. Upon graduation he moved to Ventura, California, where he began his professional life as a prosecutor in the Ventura County District Attorney's Office.

Rains' activity at age 29 in civic affairs in Ventura led to him receiving the "Distinguished Service Award" as the Ventura's "Outstanding Citizen". This involved coaching the Ventura Youth Basketball League and establishing a youth employment service, a free legal clinic, a community hotline, a drug treatment center, and a medical program for the aged and infirm. He also served as Chairman of the Ventura Planning Commission and as Chairman of the Comprehensive Plan Advisory Commission.

His early involvements also included the American civil rights movement and work in planning and environmental causes, groups and related organizations, the majority of which he represented on a pro bono basis. He served on the University of California Alumni Council and later as a trustee of the Robert Maynard Hutchins/ Encyclopedia Britannic Center for the Study of Democratic Institutions.

== Political career and legislative highlights ==
CA Resolution Commending SOR

At age 32, Rains was elected to serve the first of three terms in the California Senate representing the Central Coast Area of California. Although a fiscal conservative, Rains was progressive on social issues.

When Ronald Reagan was Governor of California, Rains and Reagan developed a close working relationship and friendship that continued during Reagan's later years as president. One of several items that drew the two together was Rains' ardent demand for fiscal responsibility. In that regard, he took legislative action to cure regulatory abuse and authored the first "zero-based" budgeting and "Sunset" bills in state history. The populist/progressive side of him was earmarked by landmark legislation in the areas of political reform, alternative energy, conservation, protection of children & seniors, and promotion of women's rights.

In the Senate while serving as a gubernatorial appointee to the State Geothermal Resources Task Force and the SolarCal Council, Rains sponsored legislation encouraging the development and use of alternative energy sources, such as solar, geothermal, biomass conversion, cogeneration, wind, and developing ocean technologies.

He also authored legislation to purchase beach property for public use, authored Container Deposit legislation (the "Bottle Bill"), secured passage of an historic measure to protect the California deserts by preventing the "piracy" of California's native plants, enacted legislation to prevent strip-mining in the National and State Forests, and was instrumental in establishing both Redwood National Park and Channel Islands National Park. The state thereafter named a famous bike trail after Rains for his work in connecting various state beach parks along the coast of California.

In serving as Chairperson of the Joint Legislative Committee on Legal Equality, Rains comprehensive package of 68 bills allowed the cause of women's rights to advance in California. As a result of his efforts California became the first state in the nation to conform its laws to the "Equal Rights Amendment." The President of the National Women's Political Caucus stated that "Senator Omer Rains has done more to advance the cause of women's rights and equality under the law than any legislator in California history."

== Legal and business career ==
As an international attorney, financier and investment advisor Rains has maintained offices in Geneva, Switzerland; Sacramento, California; Lake Tahoe and New York City.

=== Legal practice ===
Career highlights:

- Martindale-Hubbell National Law Directory "A" "V" Rating, the highest rating possible for both legal competency and adherence to ethical standards.
- (LL.B./J.D., 1966). Phi Alpha Delta legal society, University of California (Berkeley)
- Ventura County District Attorney's Office (Supervisor of Offices and Major Felony Trial Deputy)
- Private Practice: Law Offices of Omer L. Rains
- Admitted, U.S. Supreme Court, 1972
- Admitted, U.S. Court of Appeals, Ninth Circuit
- Admitted, U.S. District Courts, Northern, Central, Southern and Eastern Districts of California
- Admitted, U.S. District Court, Southern District of New York
- Admitted, U.S. District Court, Northern District of Michigan
- Admitted, U.S. District Court, Western District of Missouri
- Admitted, U.S. District Court, District of Minnesota
- Admitted, U.S. District Court, Southern District of Ohio
- Special Citation of Merit, California Trial Lawyers Association, 1971
- Representative Clients: Telecommunications, Inc. (TCI); Ticketmaster; Liberty Media; Sierra Club; Sacramento Union & affiliated newspapers; Sacramento Kings of the National Basketball Association (NBA).
- Member, State Judicial Council (1979–1982).
- Member, California Law Revision Commission (1979–1982)
- Chairman: Senate Judiciary Committee (1979–1982)
- Candidate for Attorney General, State of California, 1982

=== Other Academic Highlights ===
- 1982-1996 - International Advisor, Center for New Venture Alliance (CNVA), California State University System
- 1987-1989 - School of Business, University of Calgary, Alberta, Canada
- 1990-1993 - Alaska Science & Technology Foundation, University of Alaska, Anchorage, Alaska

Statue of Rains erected September 25, 2016 by India for humanitarian work in that country.

== Nonprofit and humanitarian work ==
During Jimmy Carter's Presidential Campaigns, Rains served as his California State chair and Western States co-chair and thereafter as an international elections monitor/observer. He later served as an advisor to the South African Constitutional Revision Commission at the invitation of Nelson Mandela.

Rains served on the University of California Alumni Council and later as a Trustee of the Robert Maynard Hutchins/ Encyclopædia Britannica Center for the Study of Democratic Institutions.

Today Rains works with indigenous peoples in lesser developed nations. He served as chairman of the Board of Directors of Rural Education and Development, READ Global until 2012. As of August, 2013, READ had built over 67 community library and resource centers (READ Centers) in rural Nepal, India, and Bhutan. His work in the village of Ullon, West Bengal, India, has personal significance, and in 2016 India erected a 15-foot-high statue of him in a Garden of Inspirational Leaders in recognition of his humanitarian work in that country. He has also worked extensively on humanitarian causes in Latin America and Africa, as well as in other countries in Asia.

In 2021, in the village of Ullon, India, Rains will be further honored by the establishment of Colleges named the "Omer L. Rains Institute of Paramedical Sciences", as well as a College of Engineering and a Pharmaceutical College. Diplomas from the Paramedical College will be awarded in the disciplines of Physiotherapy, Occupational Therapy, Operational Theatre Technology, Dialysis, Medical Lab Technology, X-Ray Technology, Radiology and Medical Imaging.

== Brain aneurysm and stroke ==
Rains suffered a ruptured brain aneurysm and an associated hemorrhagic stroke in 2002 at the age of 61. Afterwards he was in critical condition for over a month. He recovered fully and in 2012 authored a book chronicling his life and his recovery entitled "Back to the Summit: How One Man Defied Death and Paralysis to Again Lead a Full Life of Service to Others". That book became an international best seller and a second edition was published in 2016. It has also been republished overseas and is being translated into various languages in addition to English.

The University of California has catalogued and archived some of Rains' legislative material and it is now housed in a "Special Collection" for use by academics, historians, students and others. The collection comprises thousands of documents and files covering 35 linear feet of shelf space and is available for review by interested parties. The majority of information that follows can be confirmed by documents in that collection, referenced hereinafter as "Special Collections, University of California, Santa Barbara."

== Publications ==
- "The Fallacy of Neutral Regulatory Reform," California Law Reporter, University of San Diego School of Law, Fall, 1981.
- "Government Spending and Regulation," California Finance Report, February/March, 1981.
- "The Community Force", Magazine of the West, June, 1982.
- "Legal Services for the Poor," The Center Magazine, January/February, 1986.
- "Back to the Summit: How One Man Defied Death and Paralysis to Again Lead a Full Life of Service to Others," Morgan James Publishing Co., New York, New York, 2012. A second edition of this international best-selling book was published in 2016.
