= Roy Ashburn =

American politician (born 1954)

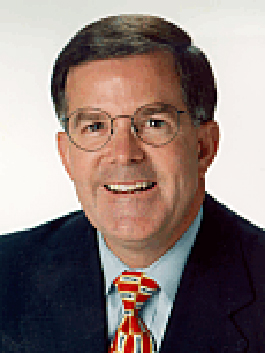
- Ashburn in 2002

Member of the California Senate from the 18th district
- In office December 2, 2002 – November 30, 2010
- Preceded by: Jack O'Connell
- Succeeded by: Jean Fuller

Member of the California State Assembly from the 32nd district
- In office December 2, 1996 – November 30, 2002
- Preceded by: Trice J. Harvey
- Succeeded by: Kevin McCarthy

Member of the Kern County Board of Supervisors from the 1st District
- In office January 7, 1985 – December 2, 1996
- Preceded by: Gene Tackett
- Succeeded by: Jon McQuiston

Personal details
- Born: March 21, 1954 (age 72) Long Beach, California, U.S.
- Party: Republican
- Spouse(s): Diane (div. 2003) Nattapong "Gogo" Charoenmit (m. 2020)
- Children: 4
- Education: California State University, Bakersfield (B.A.)

Roy Arthur Ashburn (born March 21, 1954) is an American politician from Kern County, California. A Republican, he served as a California State Senator from 2002 to 2010 representing the 18th district. He previously served three terms in the California State Assembly, representing the 32nd district and 12 years on the Kern County Board of Supervisors. He served on the California Unemployment Insurance Appeals Board from 2011 until February 2015, after having been appointed by Governor Arnold Schwarzenegger.

Although he had maintained a firm voting record against gay rights legislation, Ashburn acknowledged that he is gay in March 2010, and after coming out he increasingly spoke out on gay rights.

== Personal background ==
Born in Long Beach, California, Ashburn grew up in San Luis Obispo, California and graduated from Arroyo Grande High School, where he had been student body president. He attended College of the Sequoias in Visalia before earning a bachelor's degree in public administration from California State University, Bakersfield, in 1983. His religion is Roman Catholic, listed in his biography printed by California State University, Bakersfield. Ashburn is the divorced father of four daughters, Shelley, Shannon, Stacy and Suzana. He also has two grandchildren.

== 1972–2010: Political career ==
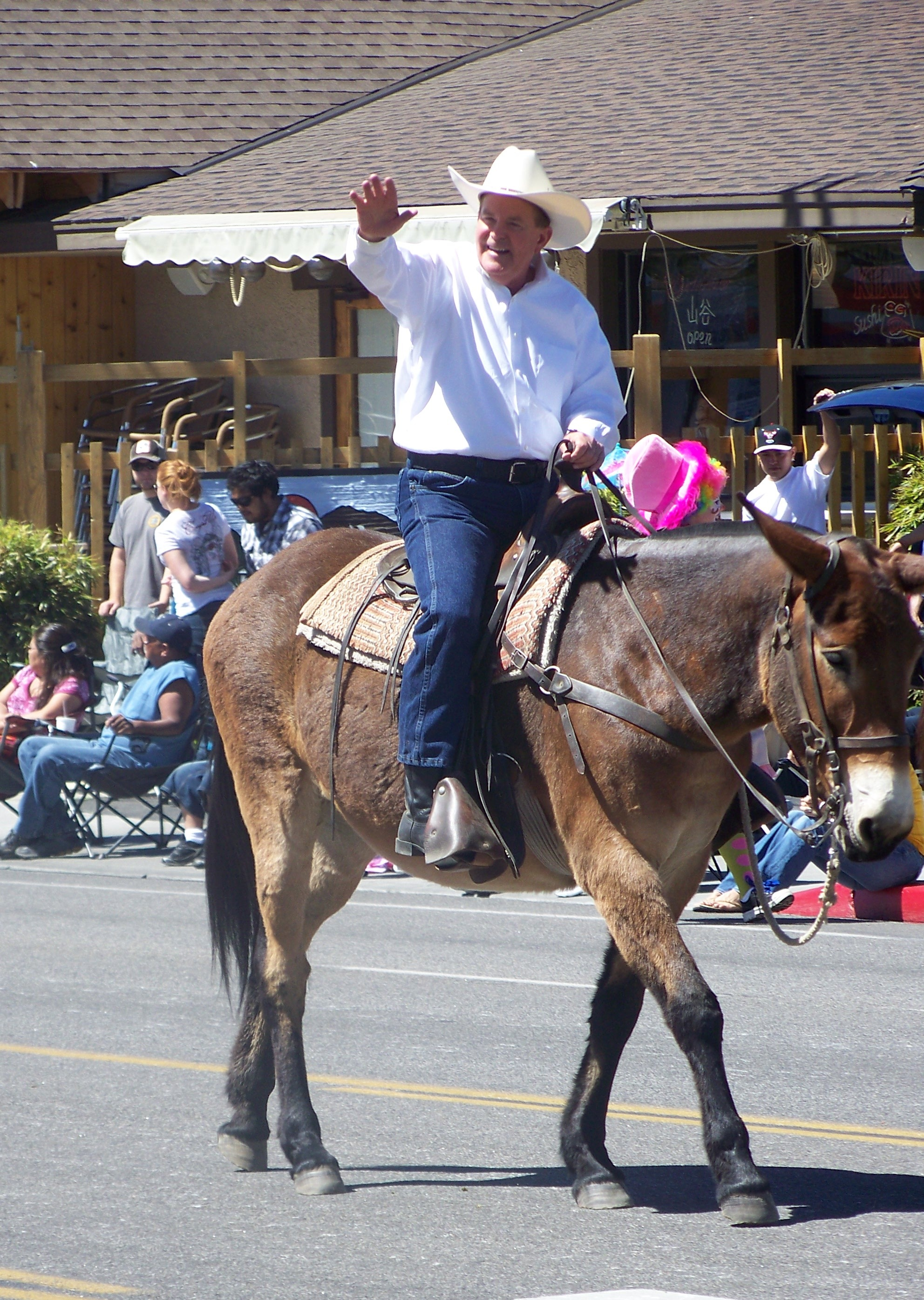
Roy Ashburn riding in the 2010 Bishop Mule Days parade

Ashburn worked for Kern County Supervisor LeRoy Jackson from 1972 to 1977, for Congressman Bill Thomas from 1979 to 1983, as a Kern County Supervisor from 1984 to 1996, as a California State Assemblyman from 1996 to 2002, and as a California State Senator from 2002 to 2010. He attended the College of the Sequoias and in 1983 received his Bachelor of Arts degree in public administration from California State University, Bakersfield. The same year he graduated from college, Ashburn served as president of the Bakersfield Republican Assembly. In 1988, Ashburn chaired the Kern County chapter of the George H. W. Bush presidential campaign.

Two years into his first term in the State Senate, Ashburn was the Republican candidate in California's 20th congressional district in 2004. His home was located in the Bakersfield portion of the district. He was the strongest Republican to run in the 20th in more than a decade. He was a decided underdog against the Democratic nominee, former State Senator Jim Costa. The 20th is a strongly Democratic, Latino-majority district, and the district's previous incumbent, Democrat Cal Dooley, had held the seat without serious difficulty for 14 years.

However, the Republicans poured more money into the race than was expected for such a heavily Democratic district. Ashburn claimed Costa would vote to raise taxes; in a play on Costa's name, he aired ads saying "Costa's gonna cost ya!" He also compared Costa to former Governor Gray Davis, calling them the "two taxing twins."

In the end, Costa won by 53% to 47%. Ashburn only kept the margin within single digits by winning heavily Republican Kings County. He did, however, run ahead of the typical Republican showing in the district.

=== Political achievements/positions ===
Ashburn's work in the California Legislature has included:

- Author of "Valley Fever Vaccine Legislation," which provides funding towards vaccine research on the disease.

- One of four named authors of "Welfare-to-Work Act of 1997," which reformed California's welfare system.

According to Project Vote Smart, Ashburn voted against every gay rights measure in the State Senate since taking office, all of which subsequently passed. However, he marked a political shift after his DUI arrest by carrying an amendment of a section of the 1950 Welfare and Institutions Code which would eliminate a requirement of the Department of Mental Health to carry out research on "sexual deviants" (language which was expressly used against homosexuals when the WIC was passed in 1950); the carriage of the bill by Ashburn to unanimous passing by the Senate is the first pro-gay act vetted by Ashburn in his career.

Ashburn came out as gay during a radio interview in California and stated that he did not plan to run for any public office again.

Ashburn was vice chair of the Legislative Audit and Public Employment and Retirement Committees in the Senate and was a member of the committees of Arts, Budget and Fiscal Review, Legislative Audit, Revenue and Taxation, Rules, and Transportation and Housing, and the subcommittees on California Ports and Goods Movement and Health and Human Services.

In 2010, Ashburn backed Proposition 13, which sought to prevent seismic retrofitting from triggering property tax reassessments.

=== Arrest, conviction and consequences ===
On March 3, 2010, Ashburn was arrested on suspicion of drunk driving while operating a State of California owned vehicle. The Senator was pulled over in Sacramento by the California Highway Patrol shortly before 2 a.m., with sources saying he was leaving a Sacramento gay nightclub, Faces, in the Lavender Hill neighborhood, with an unidentified male passenger in a state-owned Chevy Tahoe. Ashburn's blood alcohol content was measured at 0.14%. The arrest "launched nationwide speculation that the veteran lawmaker is gay and therefore a hypocrite for voting against gay-rights bills." In response to those accusations, during an interview on KERN radio, Ashburn stated that he is gay and that he believes "that my responsibility is to my constituents." When asked during the interview whether he personally agreed with votes he made on gay rights issues, Ashburn didn't answer the question.

On April 14, 2010, Ashburn pleaded no contest to the charge of driving under the influence in Sacramento County Superior Court. He received a sentence of three years of informal probation and 48 hours in the county jail, though was given credit for one day for the night of his arrest, to serve the remaining day on a work project. Fines and other fees cost Ashburn $1,900 to $2,000.

== 2011–present: post-conviction life ==
Ashburn was appointed by Governor Arnold Schwarzenegger to a four-year term on the State of California Unemployment Insurance Appeals Board.

Ashburn ran for Kern County Supervisor in the June 2012 primary election and came in second place, allowing him to advance to the runoff. In the run-off election on November 6, 2012, Ashburn faced retired United States Navy Captain Mick Gleason, and lost by 20 points (40 to 60 percent). Congressional Majority Whip Kevin McCarthy endorsed Gleason while retired Representative Bill Thomas endorsed Ashburn.

In a 2013 radio interview on First Look with Scott Cox, Ashburn revealed that he had a gay brother, who died of AIDS-related illness 20 years prior. In the interview Ashburn also stated that he re-registered to vote as "no party preference" because of the Republican Party's opposition to immigration and gay rights.

As of 2020, Ashburn lived in San Luis Obispo, California and had returned to being a Republican.

California Assembly
| Preceded by Trice J. Harvey | California State Assemblyman; 32nd district 1996–2002 | Succeeded by Kevin McCarthy |
California Senate
| Preceded by Jack O'Connell | California State Senator; 18th district 2002–2010 | Succeeded by Jean Fuller |
