= Wilson Riles =

American politician (1917–1999)

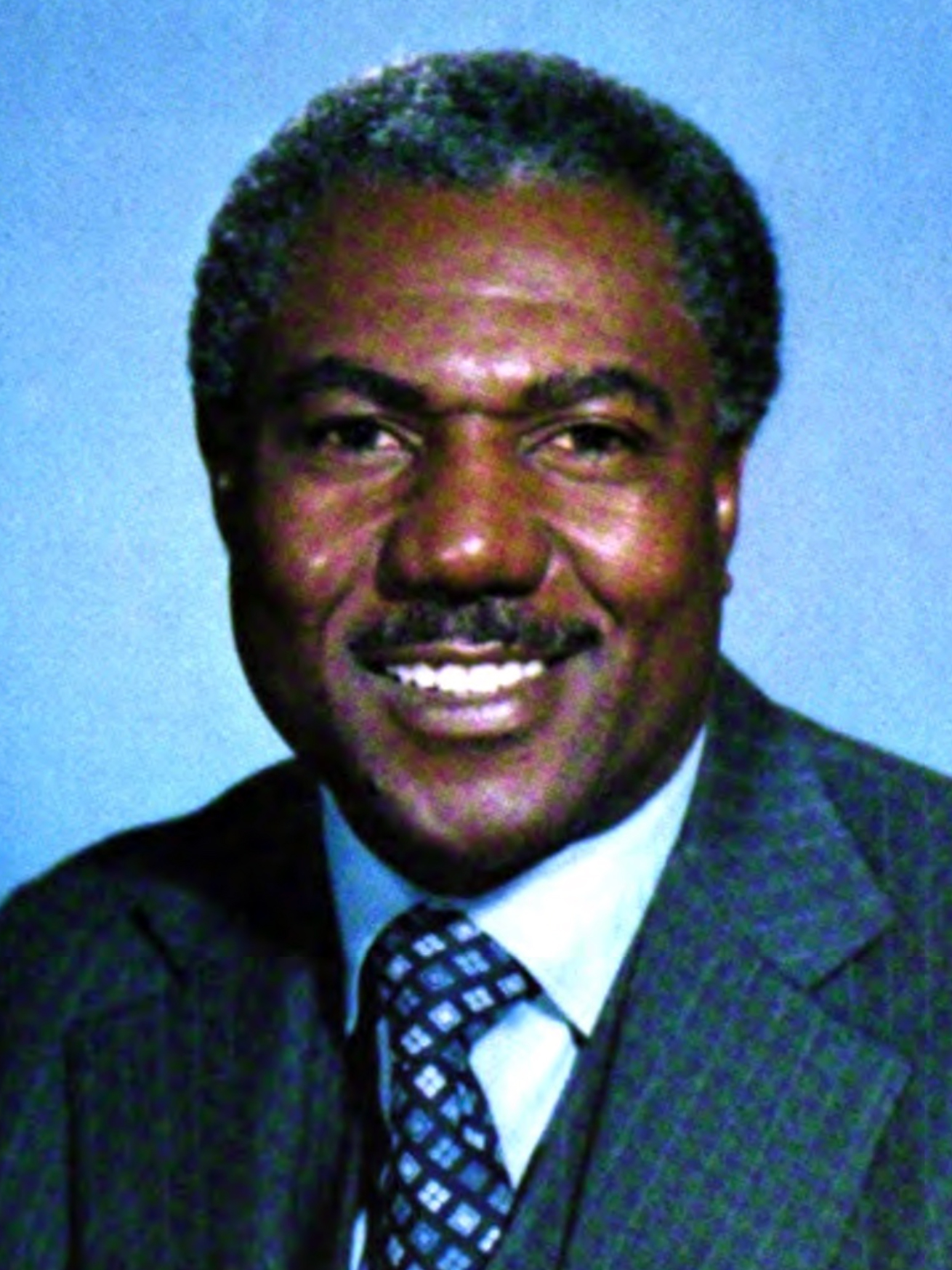
- Official portrait, 1975

23rd California State Superintendent of Public Instruction
- In office 1971–1983
- Governor: Ronald Reagan (1971–1975); Jerry Brown (1975–1983)
- Preceded by: Max Rafferty
- Succeeded by: Bill Honig

Personal details
- Born: Wilson Camanza Riles; June 27, 1917 Alexandria, Louisiana, U.S.
- Died: April 1, 1999 (aged 81) Sacramento, California, U.S.
- Resting place: Odd Fellows Lawn Cemetery and Mausoleum Sacramento, California, U.S.
- Party: Democratic
- Spouse: Mary Louise Phillips
- Profession: Educator

Military service
- Allegiance: United States
- Branch/service: United States Army
- Years of service: 1940–1945
- Unit: United States Army Air Forces
- Battles/wars: World War II

Wilson Camanza Riles Sr. (June 27, 1917 – April 1, 1999) was an American educator and politician from California. He was the first African American to be elected to statewide office in California.

== Career ==
Riles graduated from Northern Arizona University in 1940 and served in the U.S. Army Air Forces during World War II.

He was elected three times as California State Superintendent of Public Instruction. His upset win in November 1970 over controversial incumbent Max Rafferty was described as "one of the most stunning upsets in California's political history". Riles had been serving as a deputy superintendent under Rafferty and had almost no name recognition when he launched his campaign to replace Rafferty. In 1970 Riles, then-Deputy Superintendent for Program and Legislation, became convinced that the State's educational system could not survive another term with Rafferty. Riles was elected to a second term in 1974 and a third term in 1978. In 1982 he lost his bid for a fourth term to Louis "Bill" Honig.

Riles was the first African American to be elected to statewide office in California. He was also the first African American in the nation to be elected state superintendent of schools. In 1973 he was awarded the Spingarn Medal by the NAACP for outstanding achievement by an African American.

== Personal life ==
Riles was born June 27, 1917, near Alexandria, Rapides Parish, Louisiana. He was orphaned at an early age and was raised by family friends. He was married to the former Mary Louise Phillips. Riles' son, named Wilson Riles Jr., served on the city council of Oakland, California, from 1979 to 1992 and unsuccessfully ran for mayor of the city in 2002. Riles died April 1, 1999, at Mercy Hospital in Sacramento, California.

== Legacy ==
He founded the Wilson Riles Archives and Institute for Education in Sacramento as a resource for historical information about K-12 public education in California. The facility includes an archival collection available for research, a traveling exhibit for display, and an information and referral service.

Wilson C. Riles Middle School in Roseville, California, is named for him.
