= Family Re-Union =

Family Re-Union was a series of conferences and a family policy initiative hosted by former Vice President of the United States Al Gore and second lady Tipper Gore, in Nashville, Tennessee. Launched in 1992 and continuing until 2008, its goal was to strengthen family life in America by bringing together families, experts, and policymakers to address critical issues like work-life balance, education, and healthcare.

== Number of conferences ==
There were thirteen conferences in total. The sixth Family Re-Union conference occurred on June 25, 1997, at Vanderbilt University Medical Center. President Bill Clinton gave remarks at the seventh conference on June 22, 1998. Bill Purcell also appeared at a conference.
