= California State Superintendent of Public Instruction =

Educational position

State Superintendent of Public Instruction of California
- Great Seal of the State of California

- State flag

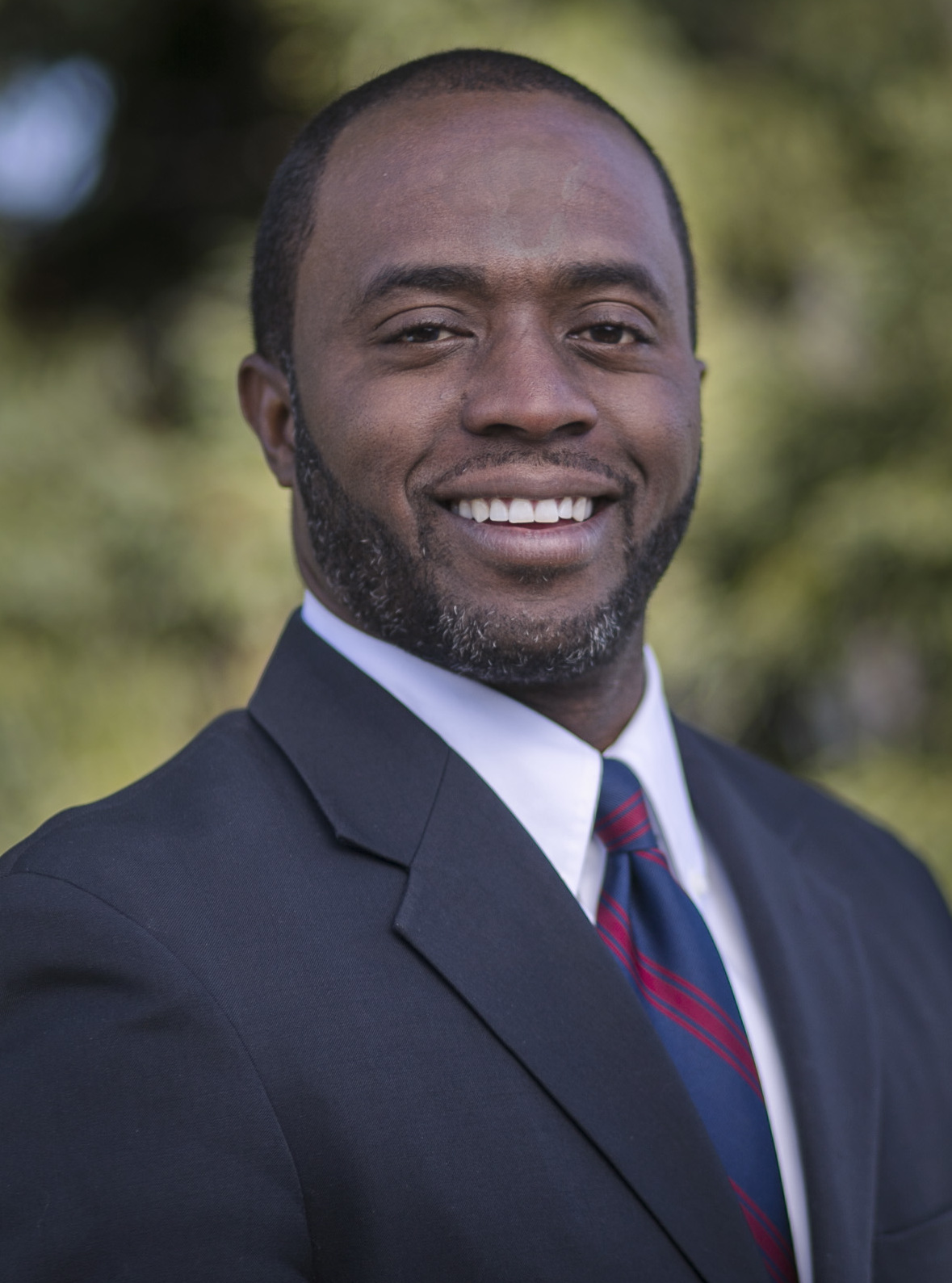
- Incumbent; Tony Thurmond since January 7, 2019
- Government of California; Department of Education
- Style: The Honorable
- Term length: Four years, two term limit
- Succession: Eighth
- Website: www.cde.ca.gov/eo

The state superintendent of public instruction (SPI) of California is the nonpartisan (originally partisan) elected executive officer of the California Department of Education. The SPI directs all functions of the Department of Education, executes policies set by the California State Board of Education, and also heads and chairs the Board. The superintendent is elected to a four-year term, serves as the state's chief spokesperson for public schools, provides education policy and direction to local school districts, and also serves as an ex officio member of governing boards of the state's higher education system. The current superintendent of public instruction is Tony Thurmond.

Under Section 2 of Article 9 of the California Constitution, the Superintendent must be directly "elected by the qualified electors of the State at each gubernatorial election." But the State Board of Education is not directly elected, and its members are not appointed by the superintendent. They are appointed by the governor subject to the approval of the state Senate. Therefore, if the governor's party has a majority in the Senate and the governor has different views on state education policy than the superintendent, the governor could put the superintendent in the position of chairing a board of members with opposing views. The California Constitutional Revision Commission proposed that the superintendent should be converted from an elected official into an appointed one, but the Commission's proposal was rejected by the state electorate in 1968.

== List of California state superintendents of public instruction ==
Name	Party	Date Assumed Office
John G. Marvin	D	January 1, 1851
Paul K. Hubbs Sr.	D	January 1, 1854
Andrew J. Moulder	D	January 1, 1857
John Swett	Union	January 2, 1863
Oscar Penn Fitzgerald	D	December 2, 1867
Henry N. Bolander	R	December 4, 1871
Ezra S. Carr	R	December 6, 1875
Frederick M. Campbell	R	January 5, 1880
William T. Welcker	D	January 8, 1883
Ira G. Hoitt	R	January 3, 1887
J. W. Anderson	R	January 5, 1891
Samuel T. Black	R	January 7, 1895
Charles T. Meredith	D	September 24, 1898
Thomas J. Kirk	R	January 2, 1899
Edward Hyatt	R	January 7, 1907
Will C. Wood	NP	January 6, 1919
William John Cooper	R	January 20, 1927
Vierling C. Kersey	NP	February 11, 1929
Walter F. Dexter	NP	February 1, 1937
Roy E. Simpson	NP	November 13, 1945
Max Rafferty	R	January 7, 1963
Wilson Riles	D	January 4, 1971
Bill Honig	NP	January 3, 1983
David Dawson (acting superintendent)		February 24, 1993
Delaine Eastin	D	January 2, 1995
Jack O'Connell	D	January 5, 2003
Tom Torlakson	D	January 3, 2011
Tony Thurmond	D	January 7, 2019

== See also ==
- G. Vernon Bennett, Los Angeles City Council member, 1935–49, ran for state superintendent of public instruction
