= California Department of Education =

State government agency

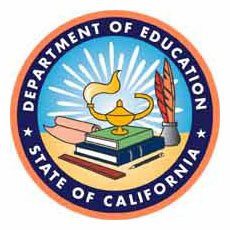

Department overview
- Formed: December 17, 1921; 104 years ago
- Jurisdiction: Government of California
- Headquarters: 1430 N Street, Sacramento, CA 95814; 38°34′25″N 121°29′21″W
- Employees: 2740 (2018)
- Annual budget: US$ 84.6 billion (2011)
- Department executives: Tony Thurmond, California State Superintendent of Public Instruction; David Schapira, Chief Deputy Superintendent of Public Instruction
- Website: cde.ca.gov

The California Department of Education is an agency within the government of California that oversees public education.

The department oversees funding and testing, and holds local educational agencies accountable for student achievement. Its stated mission is to provide leadership, assistance, oversight, and resources (via teaching and teaching material) so that every Californian has access to a good education.

The State Board of Education is the governing and policy-making body, and the state superintendent of public instruction is the nonpartisan (originally partisan) elected executive officer. The superintendent serves as the state's chief spokesperson for public schools, provides education policy and direction to local school districts, and sits as an ex officio member of governing boards of the state's higher education system that are otherwise independent of the department.

== History ==
In 1920, the California State Legislature's Special Legislative Committee on Education conducted a comprehensive investigation of California's educational system. The report recommended the consolidation and centralization of all these entities under the jurisdiction of a single California Department of Education, and also to clarify the exact relationship between the existing State Board of Education and the State Superintendent of Public Instruction. Therefore, on May 31, 1921, the legislature enacted a bill creating such a department, to be headed by a Director of Education, and which also concurrently made the State Superintendent of Public Instruction the ex officio director of the new department. (The sole entity exempt from the new department's jurisdiction was the University of California, because of a 1886 court case involving control of the Hastings College of the Law.)

Among the various entities thus integrated were the State Normal Schools, which lost their boards of trustees, were made subordinate to the department's deputy director for the Division of Normal and Special Schools, and were renamed State Teachers Colleges. This created a rather bizarre administrative situation from 1921 to 1960. On the one hand, the department's actual supervision of the presidents of the State Teachers Colleges was rather minimal, which translated into substantial autonomy when it came to day-to-day operations. The State Teachers Colleges were renamed State Colleges in 1935, but retained the same legal status. They finally regained full administrative autonomy after the recommendations of the California Master Plan for Higher Education were signed into law as the Donahoe Higher Education Act of 1960, which created the State College System of California (now the California State University) and authorized the appointment of a board of trustees and systemwide chancellor who would be independent of the department.

In 1967, the state's junior colleges (which had largely developed as extensions of existing high school districts at the local level) were renamed community colleges and organized into a new system called the California Community Colleges, and that system was then authorized to have its own board of governors and systemwide chancellor who would also be independent of the department. Since 1967, the department has been focused on regulating and supporting local school districts which directly provide the bulk of K-12 primary and secondary education throughout the state, as well as operating the state's three special schools and three diagnostic centers in support of special education.

== Ethnic studies ==
In March 2021, after four years of development, the State Board of Education unanimously passed a new ethnic studies curriculum. A bill that would have made ethnic studies a high school requirement had been vetoed by California's Governor the previous fall.

== 2023 Mathematics framework ==
Over the past several decades, California's State Board of Education has published a series of guidance documents for mathematics curriculum and instruction, such as the 1997 Math Content Standards for California, the 2010 California Common Core State Standards for Mathematics, and the 2013 and 2023 Mathematics Frameworks An early 2021 draft for the 2023 California Mathematics Framework (CMF) initially recommended a "de-tracking" proposal that would delay all public school offerings of algebra 1 to 9th grade or later, plus the addition of a "data science" pathway. Proponents of de-tracking argued that this would place all students in the same math courses for longer. Critics of the delay of algebra 1 raised concerns about potential impacts on public-school-student access to calculus.

Beyond high school course sequencing, the framework also focuses on culturally responsive teaching, data science, and inquiry-based instruction. The Board of Education’s guidance offers “big ideas in mathematics” to help students make connections between topics and use math to address real-world problems. By emphasizing data science, this framework also aims to prepare students for an increasingly tech-driven world. And with cultural responsiveness in mind, educators are encouraged to incorporate students’ cultural and social backgrounds into instruction and curriculum to make content more relevant for all. From there, students can apply mathematics to recognize, and fix, social justice issues.

The framework was advanced in response to rising racial and socioeconomic discrepancies in student achievement and trends in lower U.S. math attainment compared to other advanced countries. On July 12, 2023, the Board of Education adopted the framework.

== See also ==
- California State Superintendent of Public Instruction
- California State Board of Education
- California Commission on Teacher Credentialing
- School accreditation
- List of school districts in California
- List of school districts in California by county

=== Colleges and Universities ===
- California Community Colleges System
- California State University
- University of California
- List of colleges and universities in California
