= Union Station North =

Union Station North, Denver, Colorado
- Neighborhoods in Denver
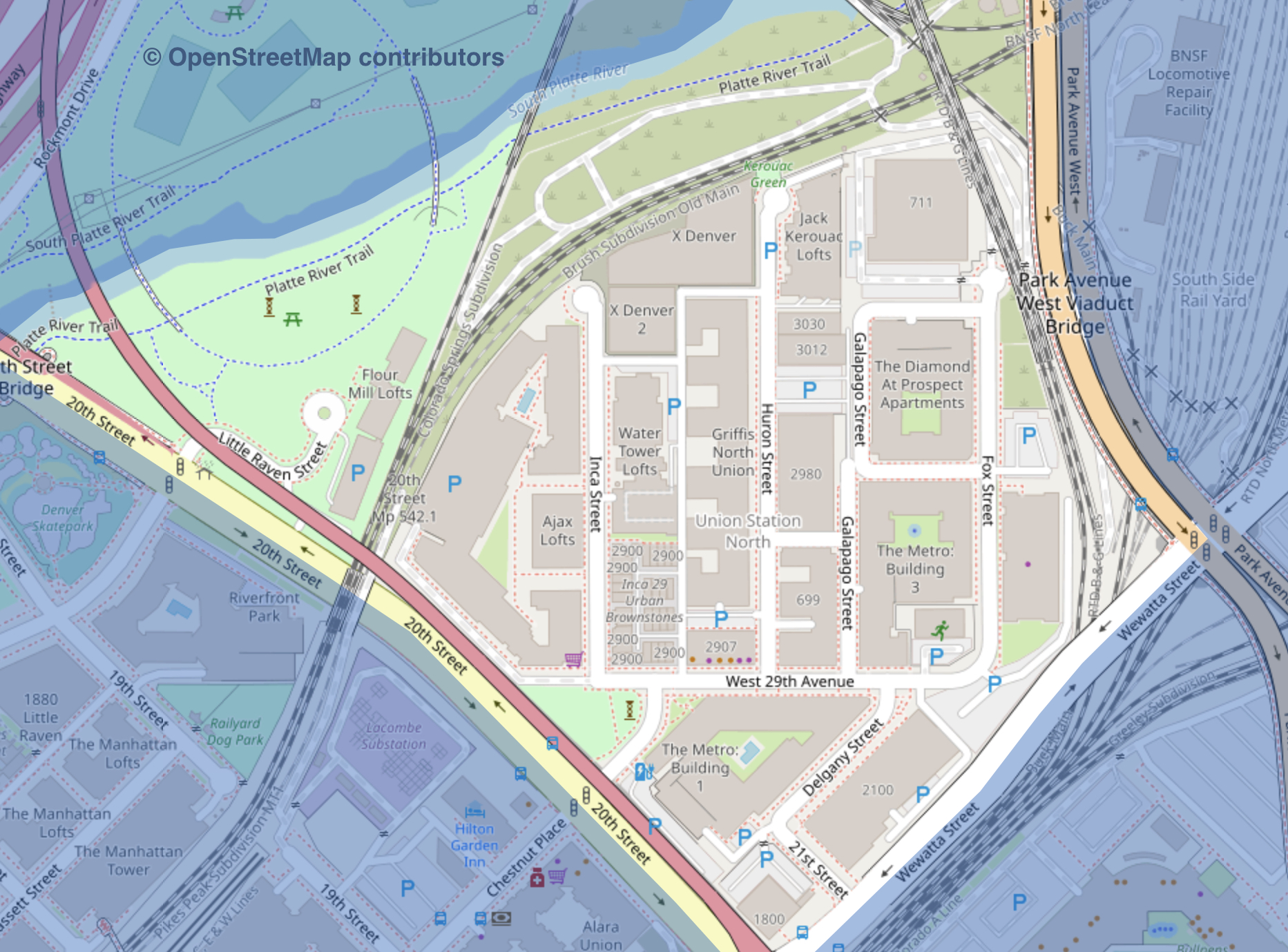
- Union Station North

- Location of Union Station North in the United States
- Coordinates: 39.7598°N 104.9968°W
- Country: United States
- State: Colorado
- City and county: Denver
- Time zone: UTC–7 (MST)
  - Summer (DST): UTC–6 (MDT)
- ZIP code: 80202

Union Station North, formerly known as Prospect, is a neighborhood within the city limits of Denver, Colorado. Previously dominated by industrial buildings, waste, railroad tracks and considered an area of the city to be avoided, today it has been rehabilitated into multi-story residential buildings, restaurants, amenities, easy access to downtown Denver, and is a short walk to the South Platte River Trail, which runs along its northern boundary.

== Name ==
Originally an area of Denver known as, "The Bottoms", "Prospect", or "Prospect Park", Union Station North is one of the oldest parts of Denver. The name, Prospect, originated from the adjacent, "Prospect Junction" railyard located partially within and immediately to the north of Union Station North.

In July 2016, the official name of the neighborhood was changed from "Prospect" to "Union Station North".

== History ==
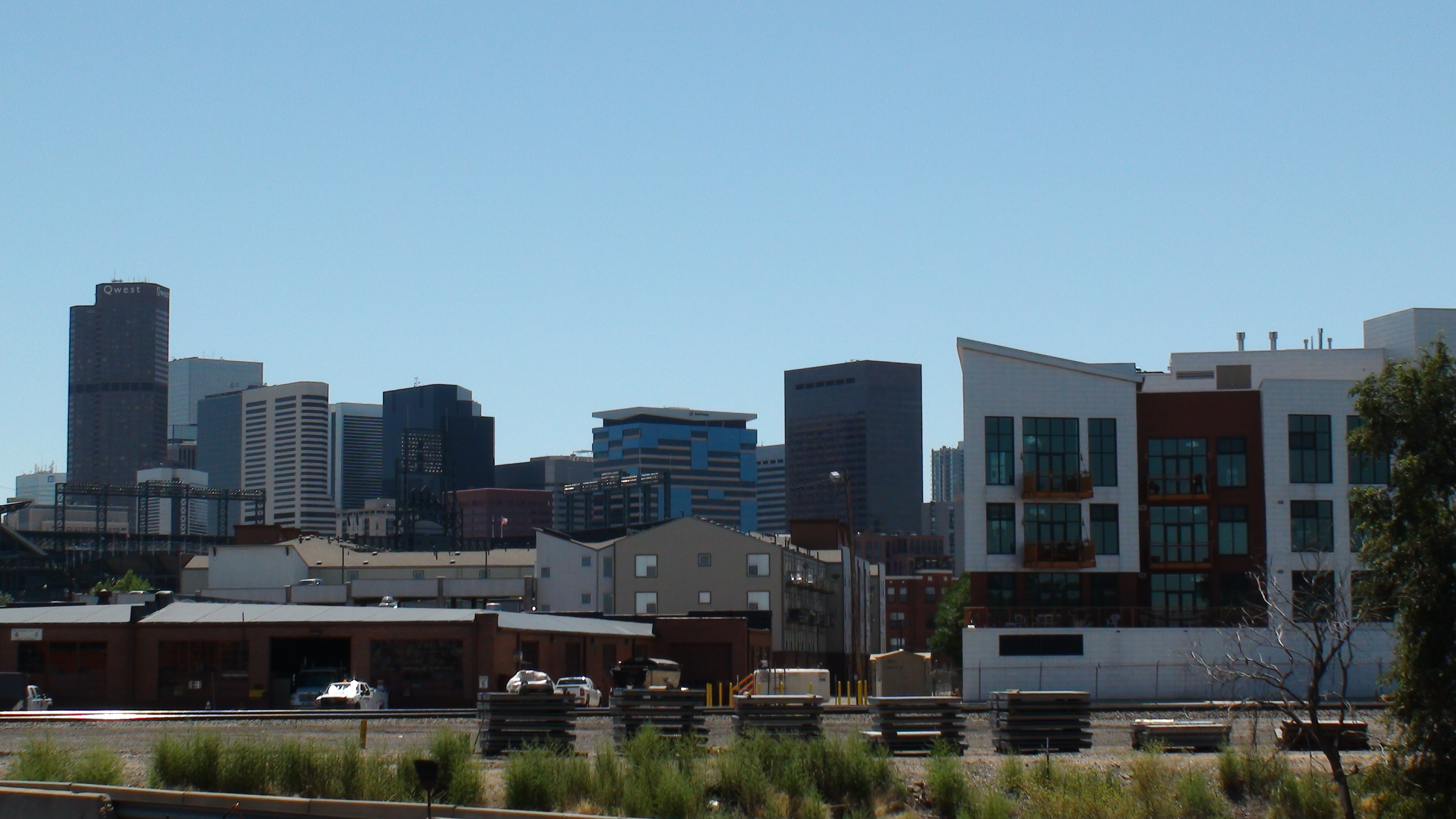
View of Union Station North with Coors Field and Denver skyline in the background

Union Station North sits on land that originally belonged to the Arapaho Tribe. They named the South Platte River, which flows along Union Station North, Niinéniiniicíihéhe. The discovery of gold in Denver in 1858 resulted in a large increase of white settlers to the area and the native population was pushed out. From the city's founding and continuing through the 1970s, the South Platte River was essentially treated as an open sewer.

By the 1960s, Union Station North contained immigrant housing, vacant lots, railroad tracks, and industrial plants dumping discharge into the South Platte River. Along the river's banks could be found landfills, discarded cars, weeds, old tires, waste, feathers from a pillow factory, and hobo camps. The area was considered an undesirable place to live.

In the 1990s and through the 2010s, redevelopment took place in the LoDo/Union Station/Riverfront Park/Confluence Park areas along with the building of Coors Field (1995) and the creation of Cuernavaca Park (2000). This redevelopment spread to the adjacent Union Station North neighborhood and residential buildings were planned and built. In 2006, Denver developer Dana Crawford referred to Union Station North as, "a very industrial area" and Denver architect Jim Johnson added, "this is still the true-grit part of town".

In 2019, the new commuter rail G Line added an additional set of tracks through the neighborhood in the guise of a bridge over both the South Platte River and BNSF rail lines in the Prospect Junction area.

Today, Union Station North is a small, primarily residential community combined with daily passages of locomotives transiting in and out of the Denver area.

== Geography ==
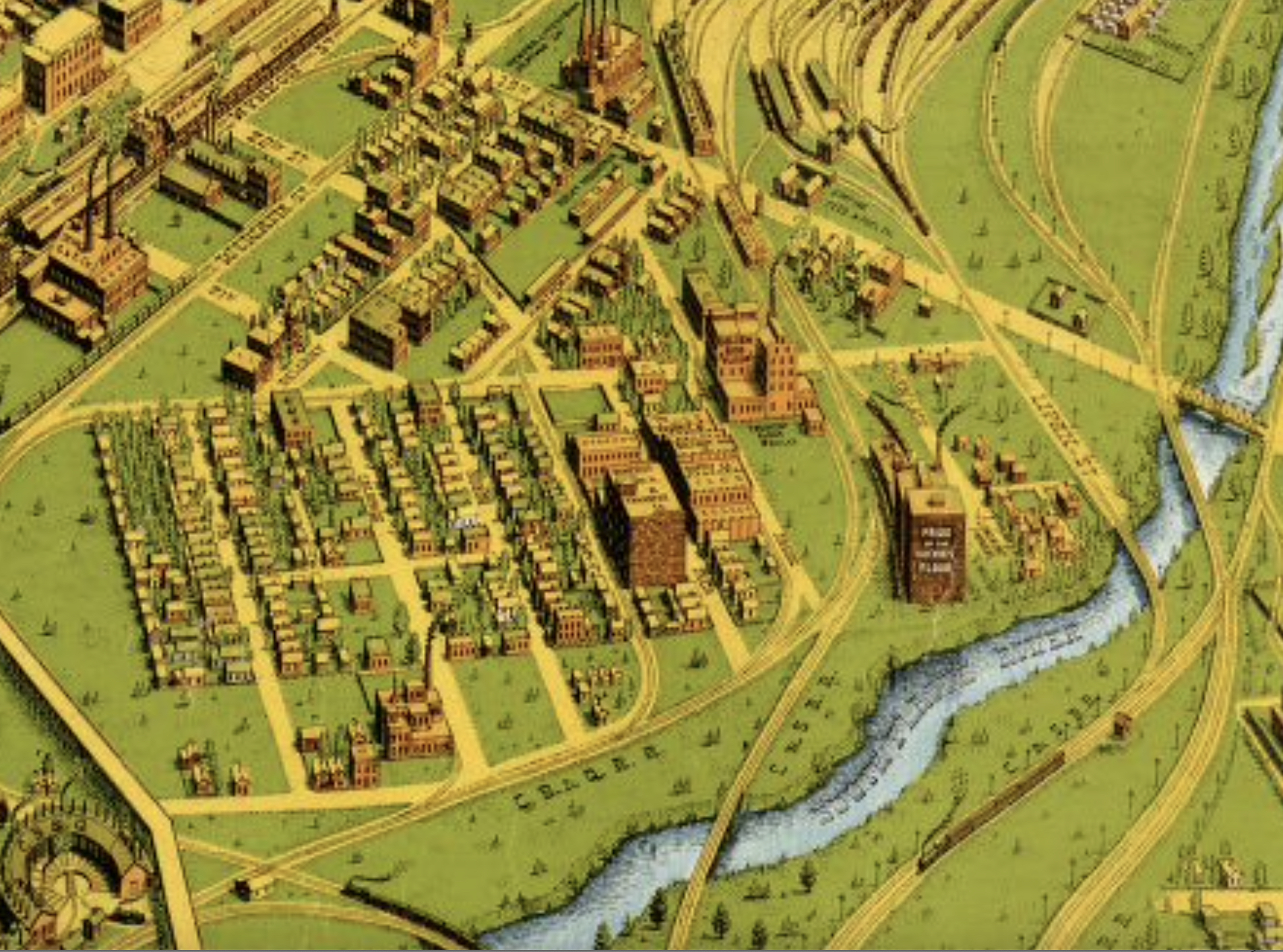
1908 aerial view of Union Station North facing southwest

Union Station North is located on the north side of Downtown Denver and is wholly contained within the larger neighborhood of Five Points. It is bounded by the South Platte River to the north, Cuernavaca Park to the northwest, 20th Street to the southwest, Wewatta Street to the southeast and the Park Avenue West viaduct to the east. Union Station North is additionally surrounded by the Union Station/LoDo neighborhood to the southwest, Ballpark neighborhood to the southeast, River North Arts District ("RiNo") neighborhood to the east, and the Highland neighborhood to the north. Coors Field is adjacent to Union Station North, located on the south side of the community.

Some streets in the neighborhood, Chestnut Place, Wewatta Street, 20th Street, 21st Street and Delgany Street, follow the old Denver city grid laid down in the 1850s. The remaining streets follow the north/south configuration system of 1864 which was designed in order to comply with federal government mandates.

The northern boundary of Union Station North follows the South Platte River, which has had a history of flooding in the past. Today, tall embankments run along both sides of the river which guard against infrequent, yet inevitable high water. Additionally, the walking/biking South Platte River Trail skirts along the river.

== Demographics ==
As of 2010, Union Station North had a population of 3077 residents. The neighborhood's average age is 41 and 47% of the population are homeowners.

== City of Cuernavaca Park ==
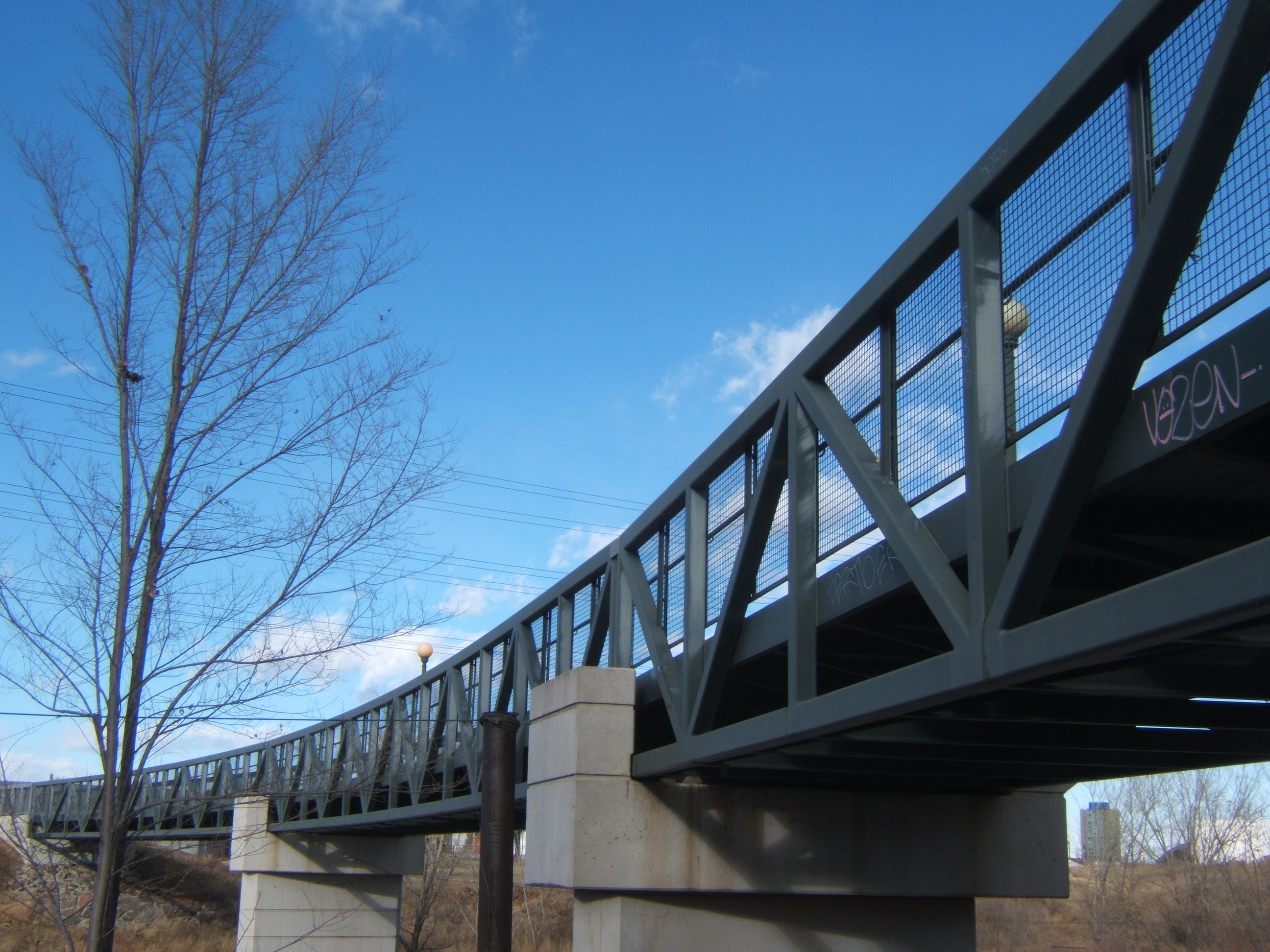
Pedestrian bridge, Cuernavaca Park

The City of Cuernavaca Park is divided by the South Platte River, the southern section being located within the Union Station North neighborhood along with the Flour Mill Lofts. The South Platte River Commission recommended the park's construction in 1995 and it was completed in 2000. The creation of Cuernavaca Park reclaimed and repurposed land that had been an industrial wasteland for over a hundred years. Formerly in this area along the South Platte river were numerous mills discharging volumes of thick, black and gray soot into the sky, polluting the air and land of the downtown Denver area. Denver had the largest concentration of flour mills in the western United States. By 1975, as the area's industrial operations slowed, this part of Union Station North became a disused muddy stretch of the river filled with weeds and passing locomotives belching diesel smoke. In 1974, the Platte River Development Committee was created with goals that included recovering the South Platte River for boating enthusiasts, creating parks and linking the entire urban river area with concrete pedestrian/biking trails. Today, Cuernavaca Park contains large areas of grass, trees, covered picnic pavilions, a baseball diamond, paved trails on both sides of the river, tables, benches and toilet facilities. Rock sculptures are located immediately north of the Flour Mill Lofts.

The dominating feature of the park is the oval walking/biking path that offers two bridges for crossing the river. The bridges are reminiscent of nineteenth-century railroad trestle bridges keeping in character with the industrial-chic flavor of the area.

The Mexican City of Cuernavaca is one of Denver's sister cities.

== Fauna ==
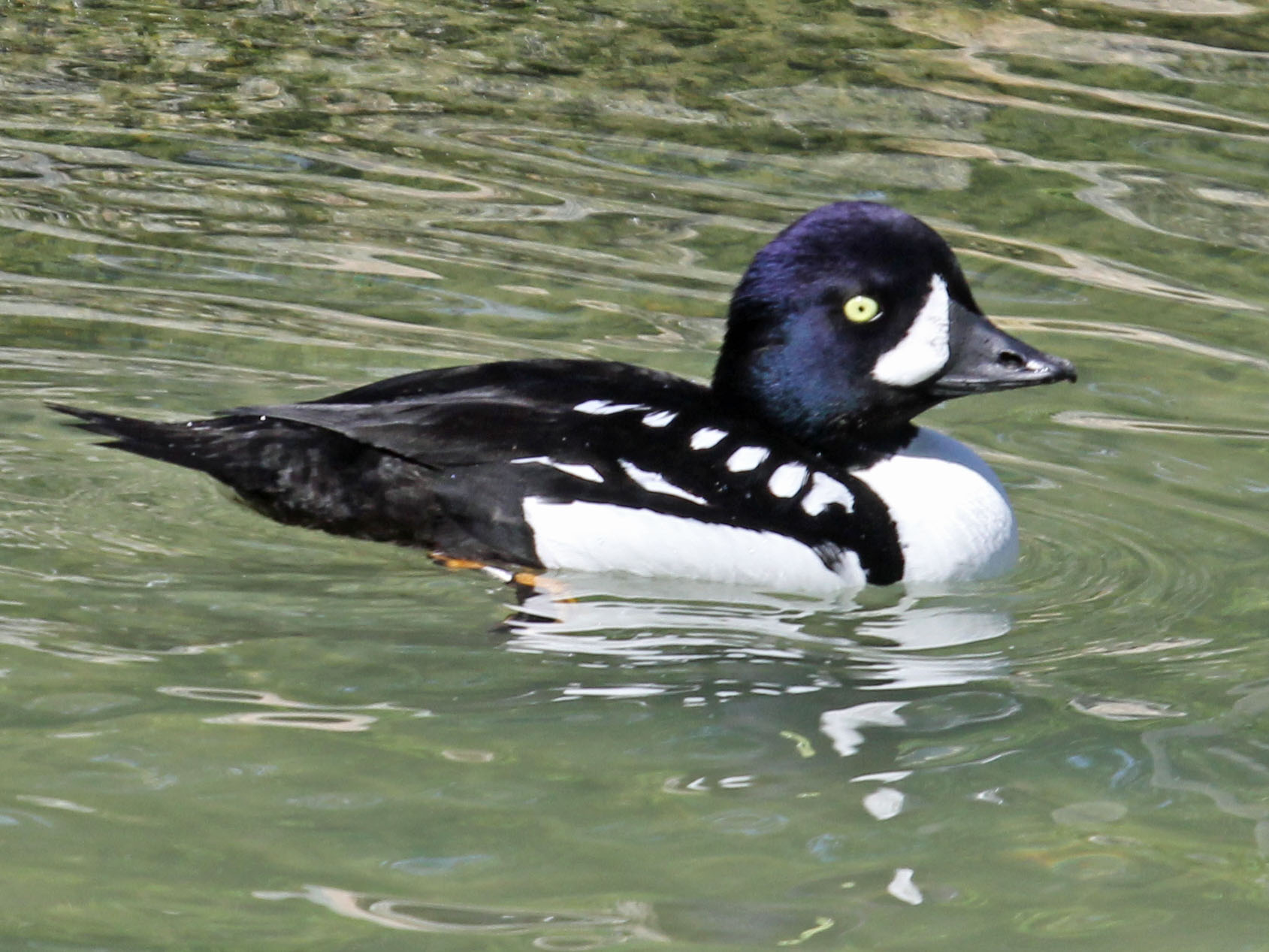
Barrow's Goldeneye are a common sight along the South Platte River

The fauna of Union Station North is rich for a large downtown metropolitan area. Barn swallow, Barrow's Goldeneye, Black-crowned Night-Heron, Cliff Swallow, Ferruginous Hawk, Forster's Tern, green heron, Northern Rough-winged Swallow all make their homes along the South Platte River and can often be seen from the South Platte River Trail.

== Gallery of Union Station North ==
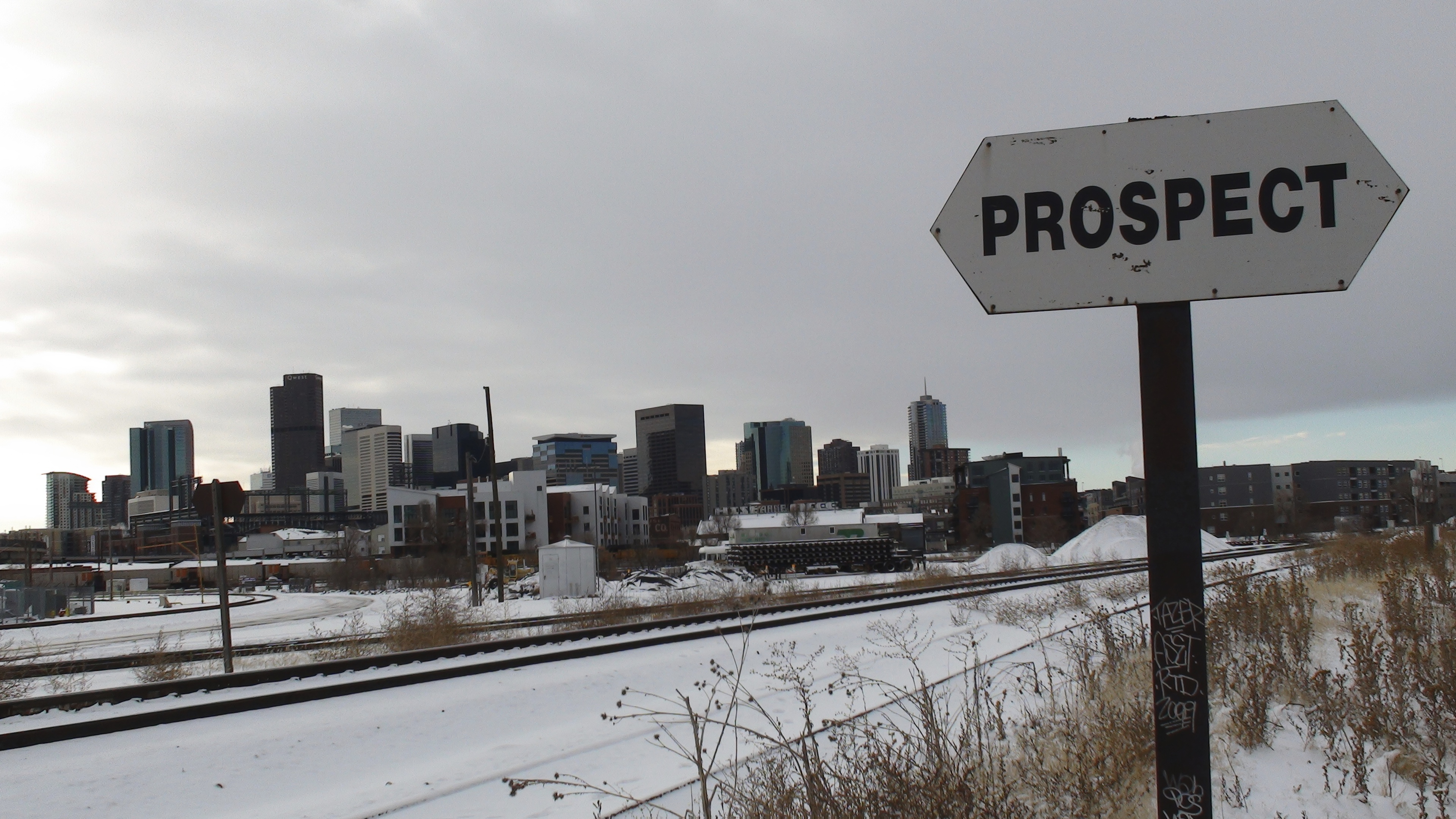
View looking south from Prospect Junction towards Union Station North

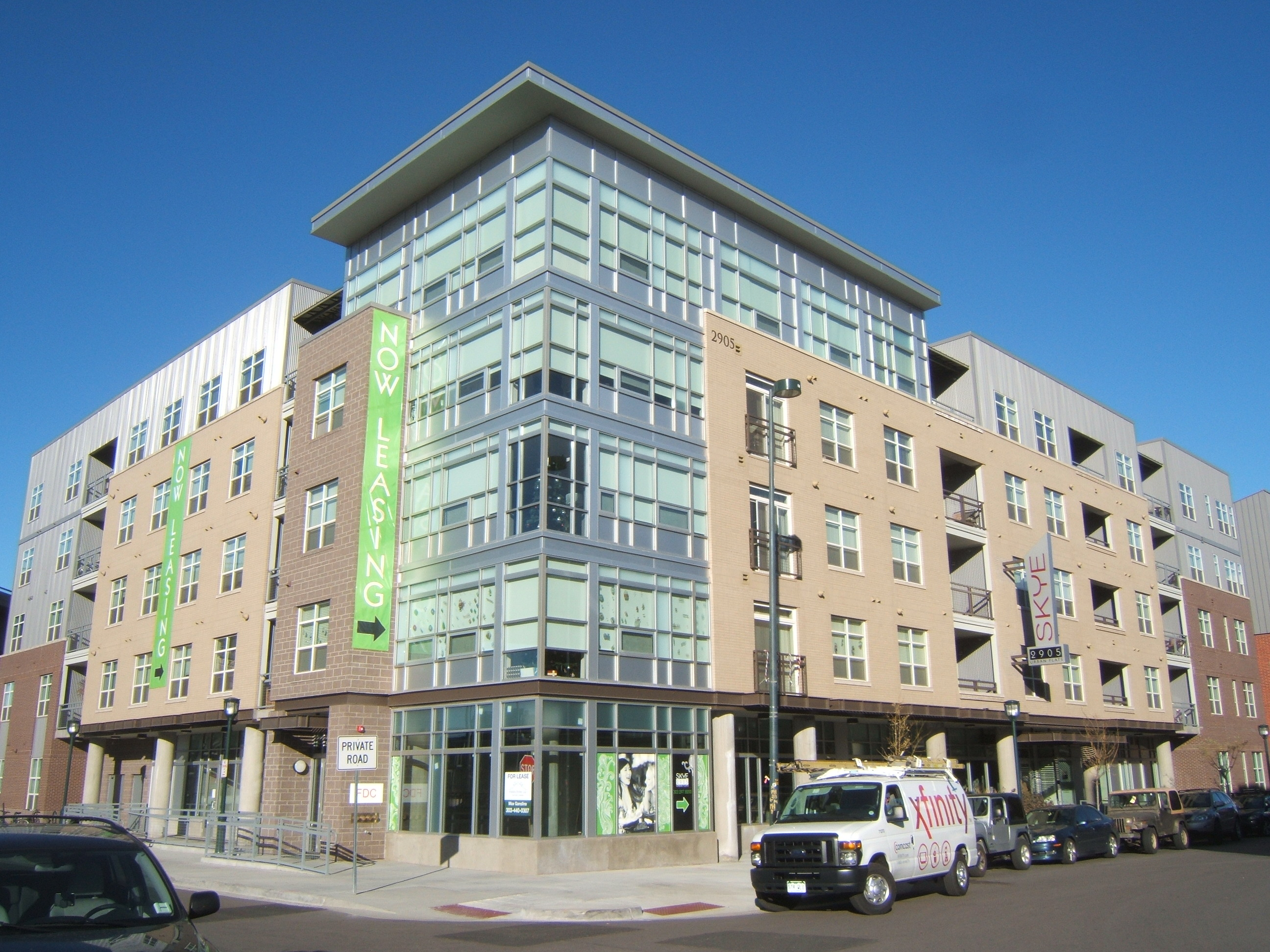
Skye Apartments (renamed Griffis Union Station)

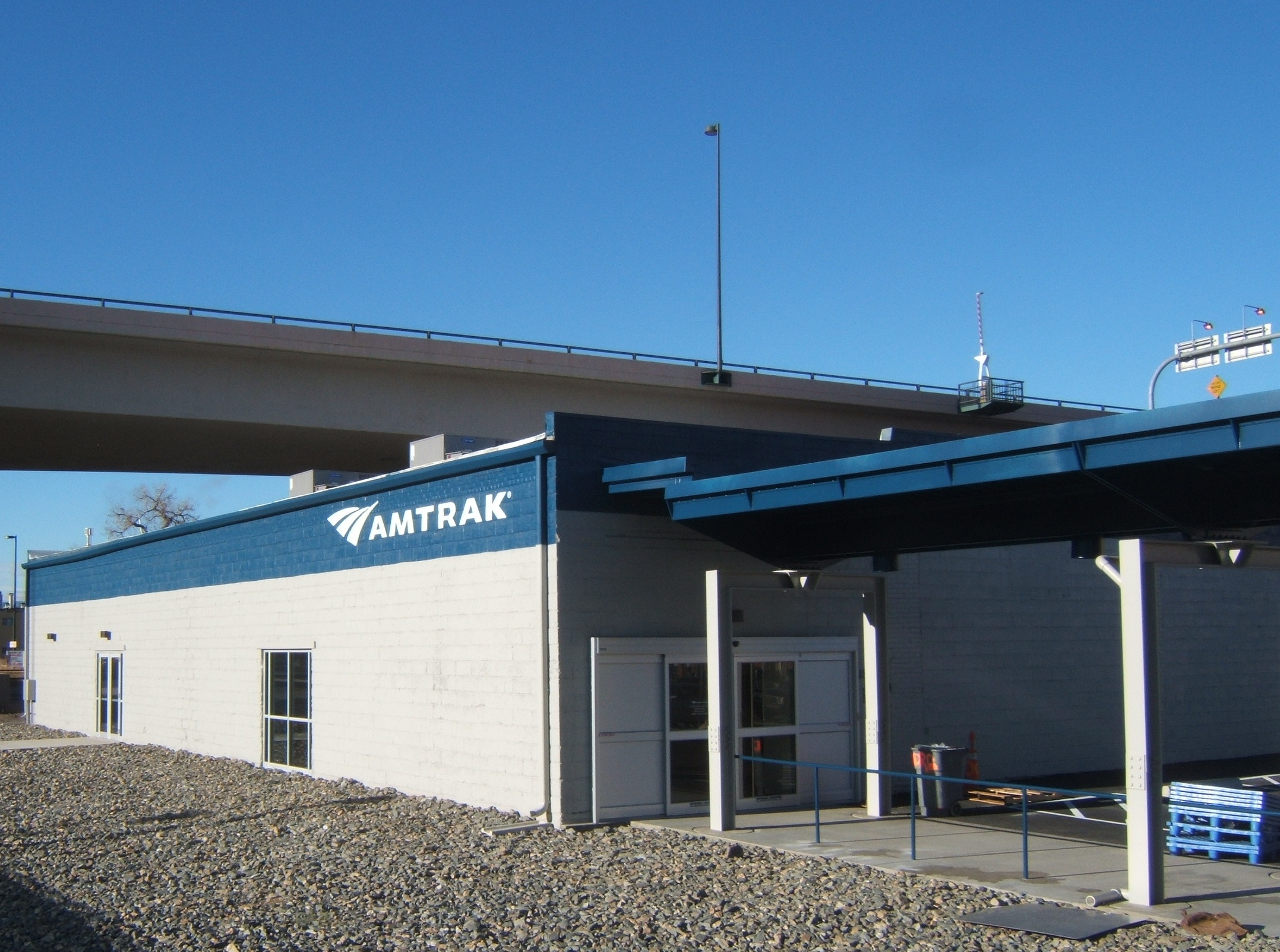
Amtrak building, west corner of Wewatta and 21st Street

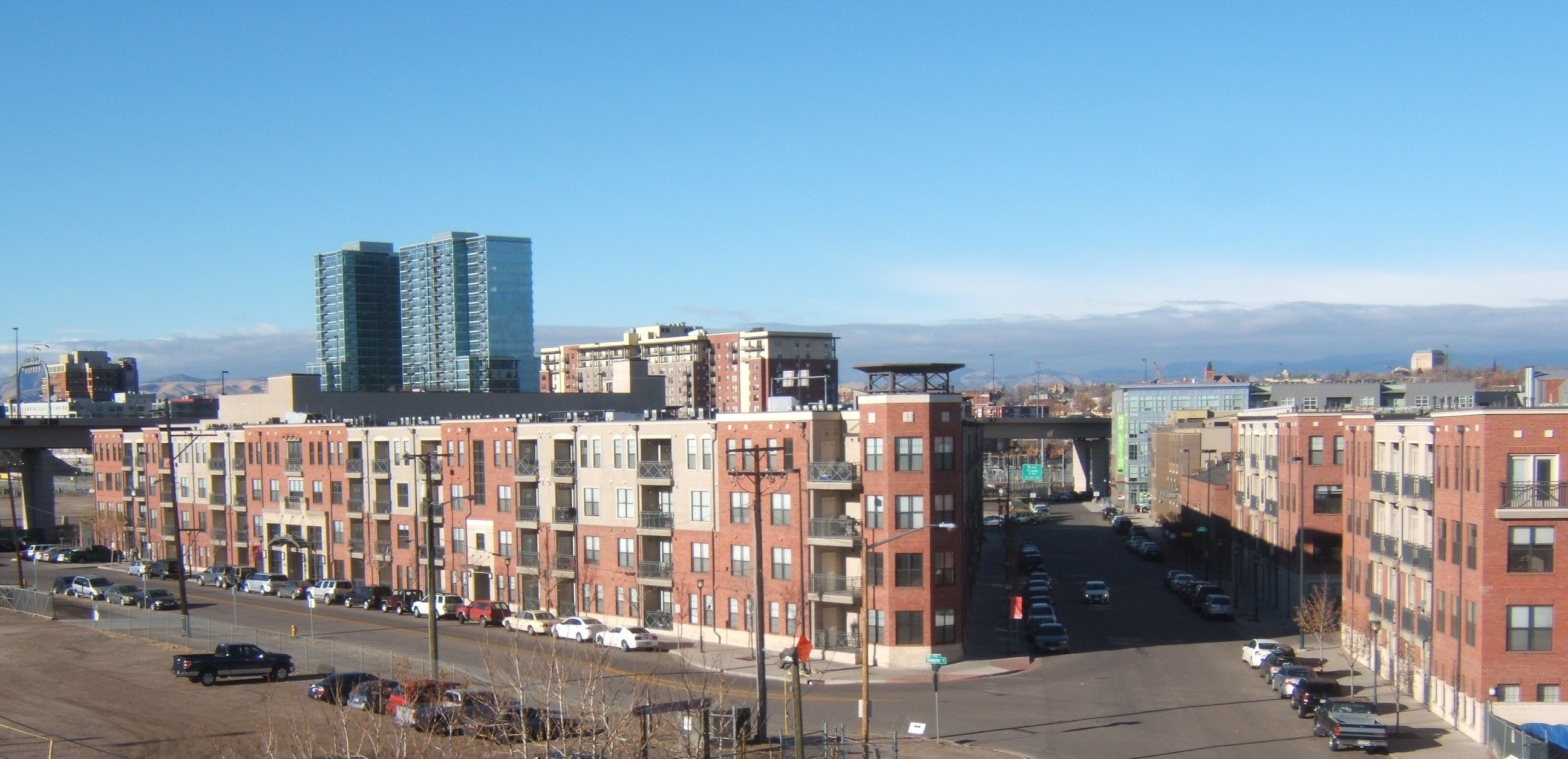
Union Station North looking west

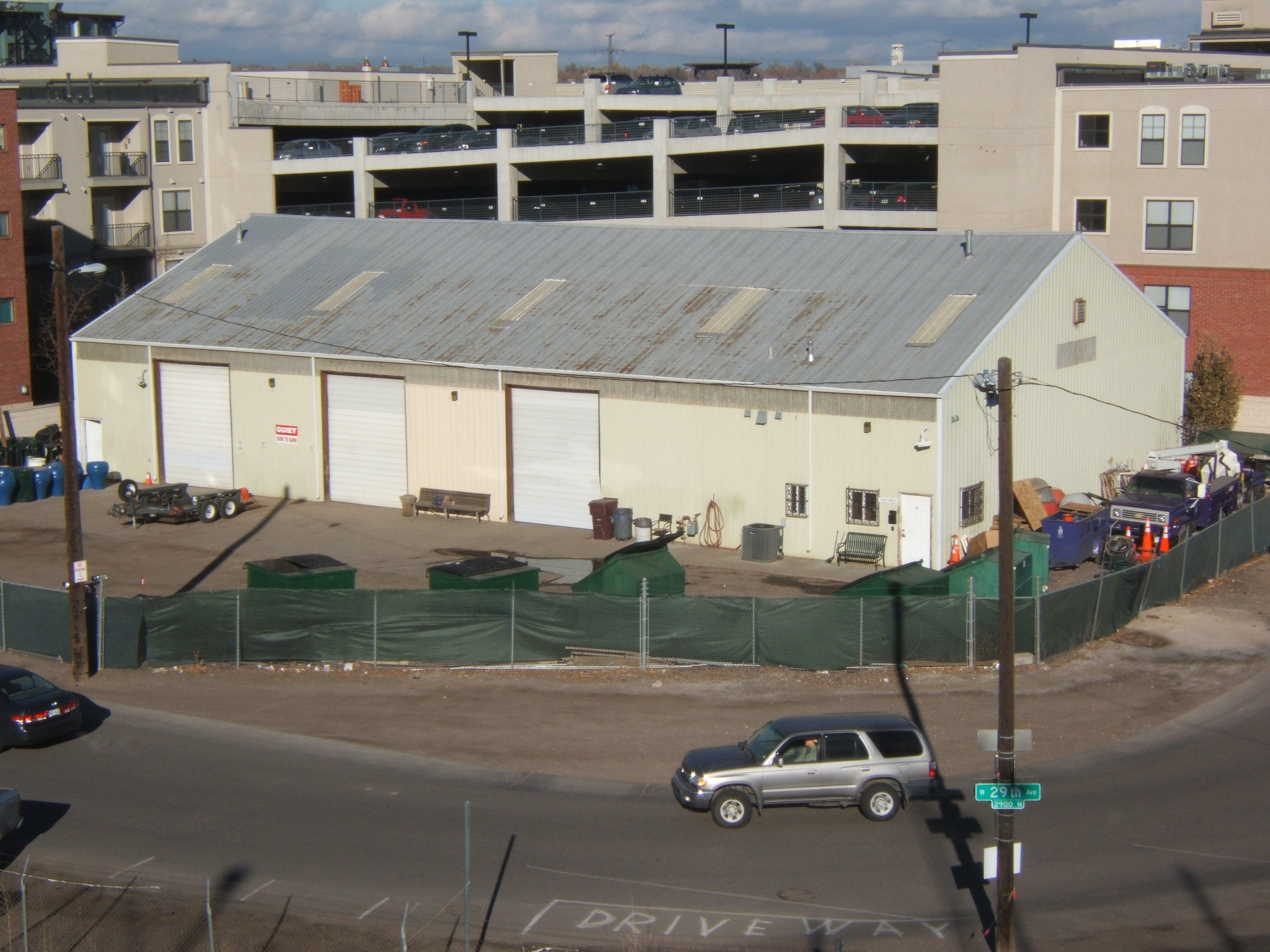
Corner of West 29th Avenue & Fox Street, looking northwest

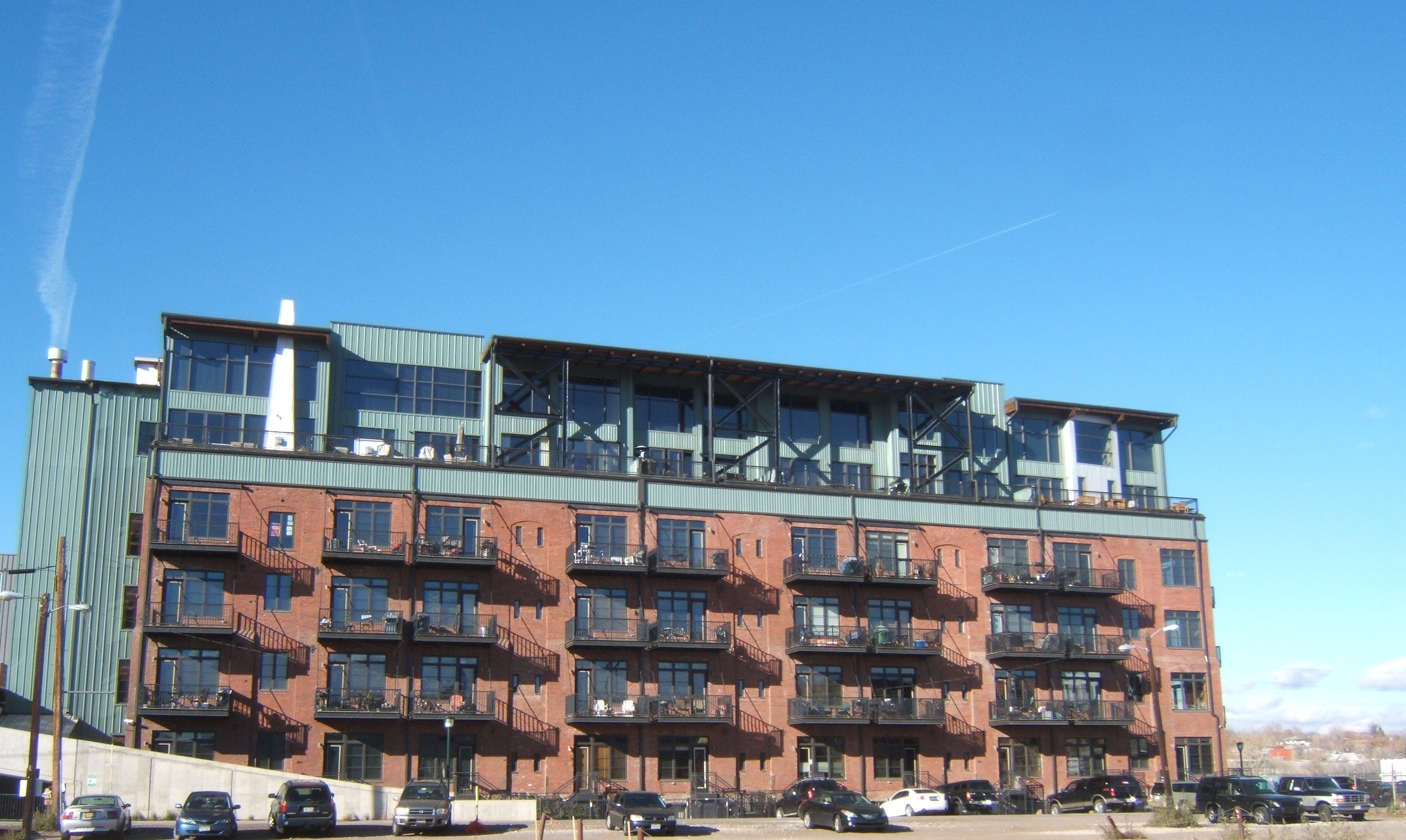
East side of Watertower Lofts

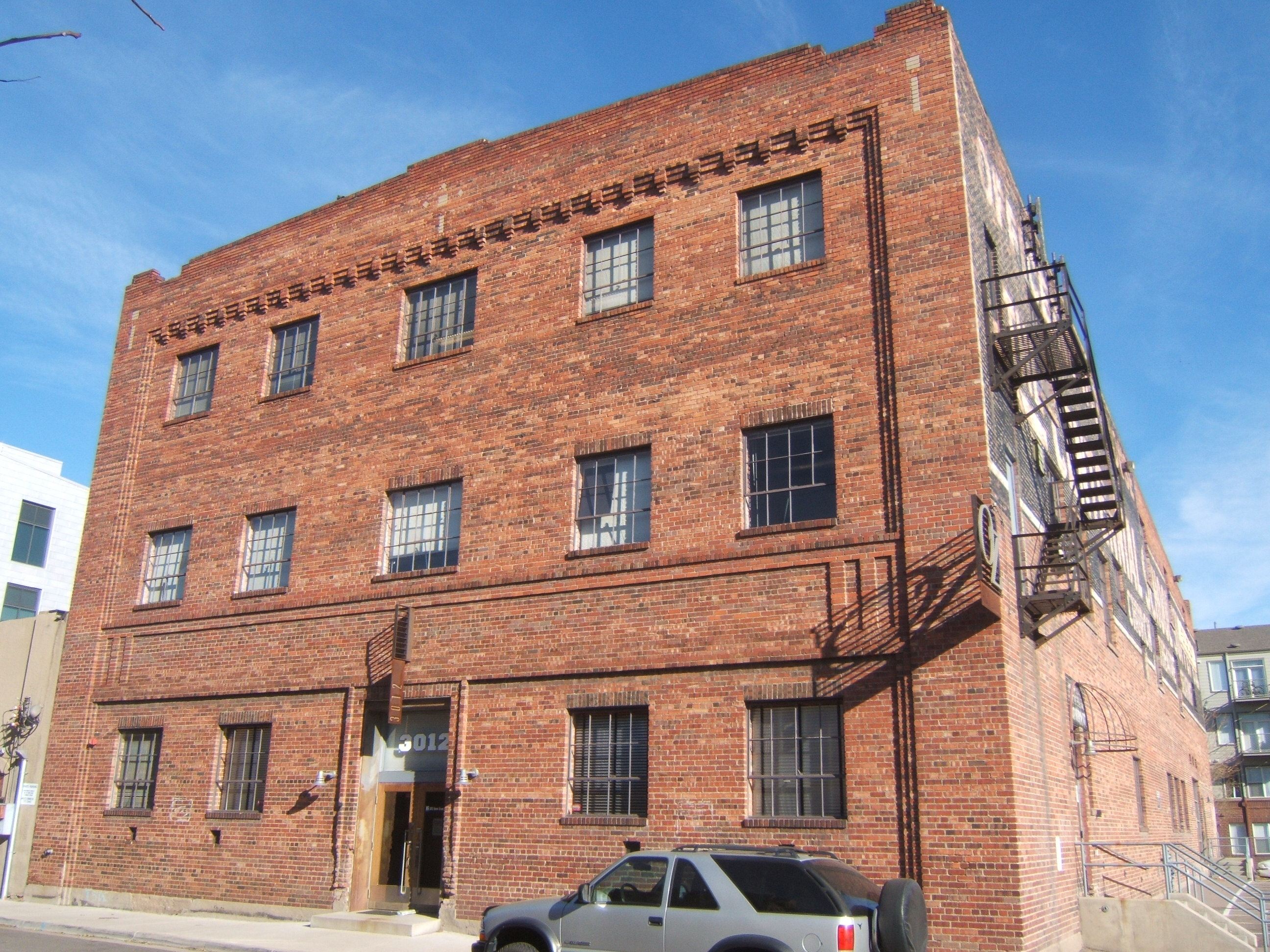
3012 Huron Street

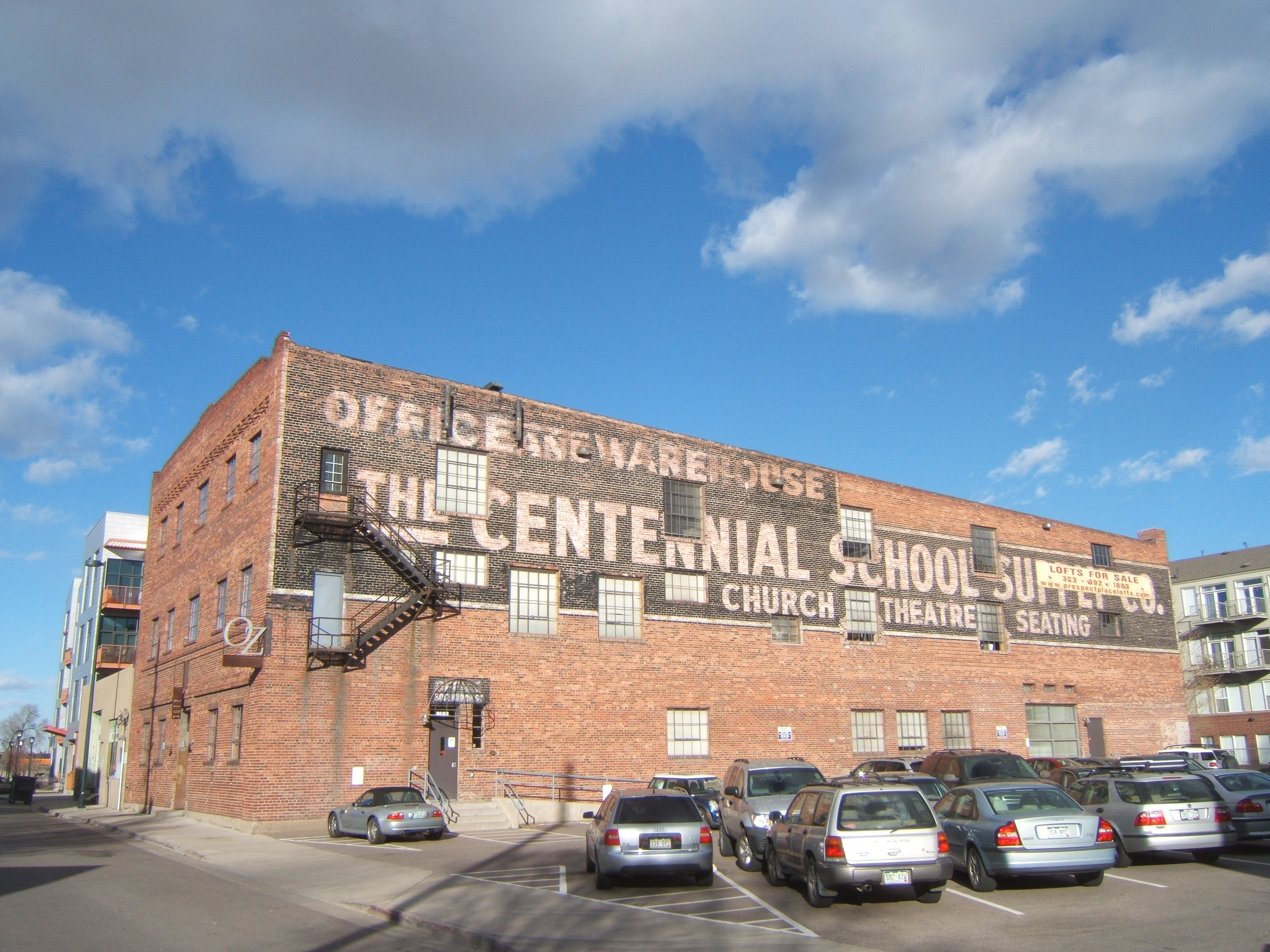
3012 Huron Street

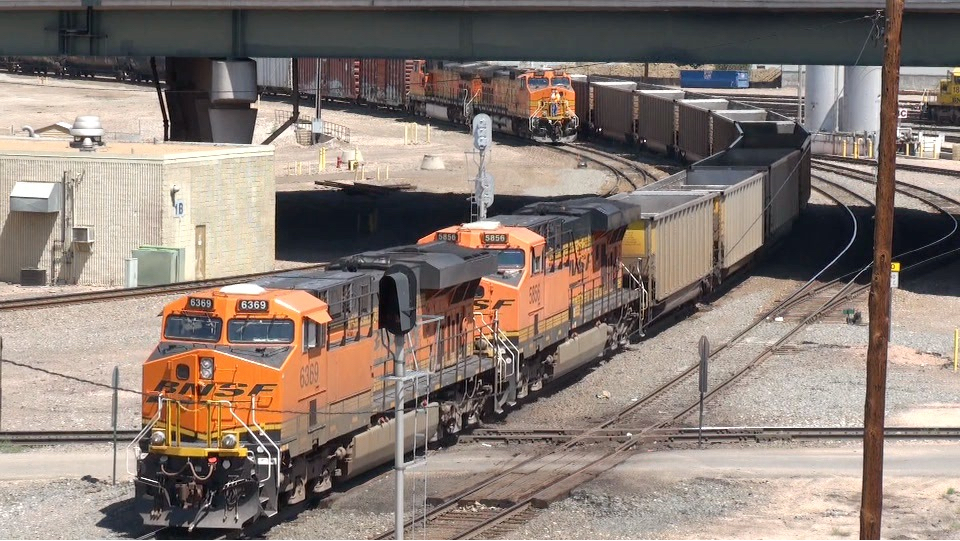
BNSF locomotives transiting Prospect Junction in Union Station North

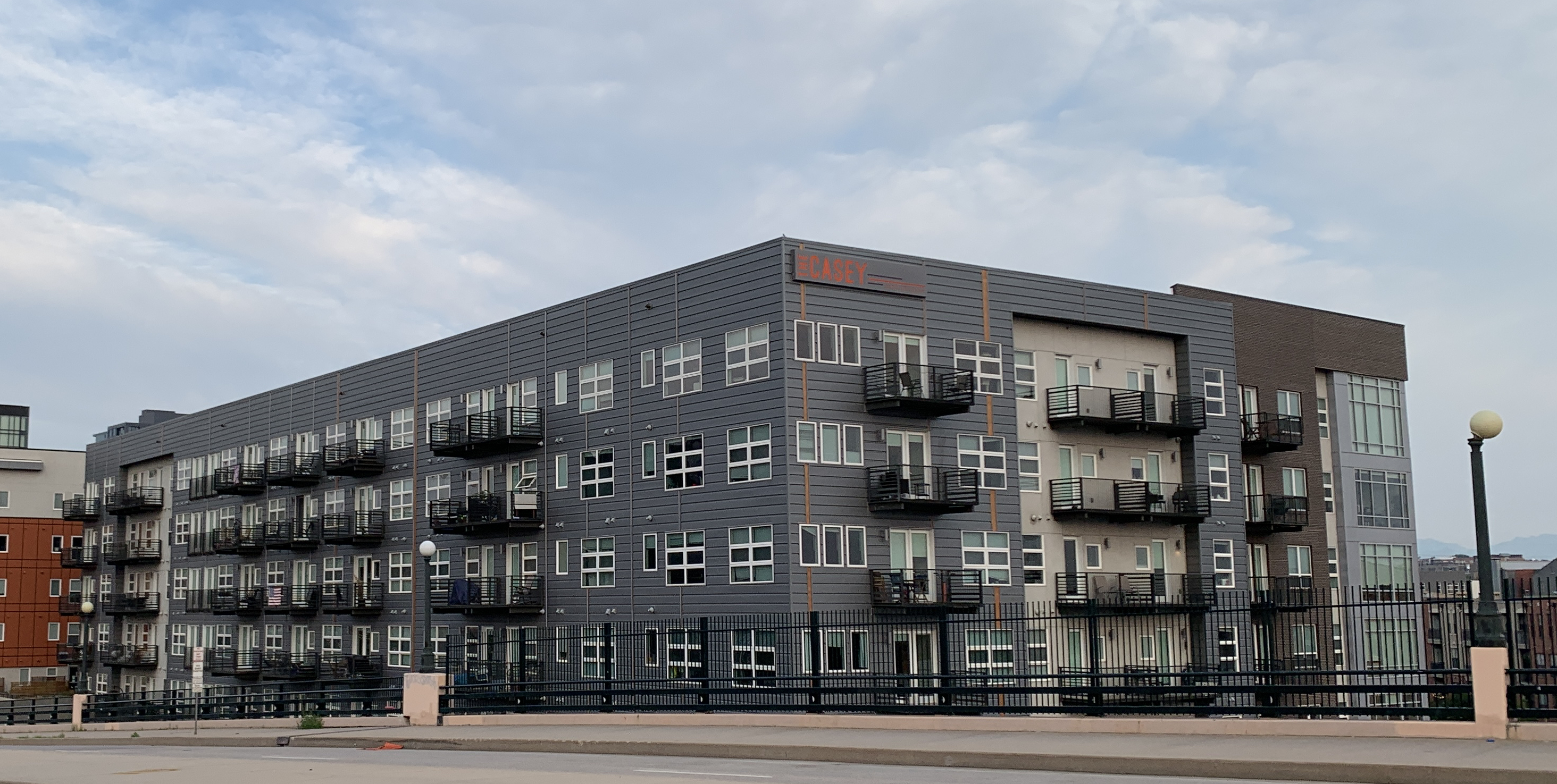
The Casey Apartments

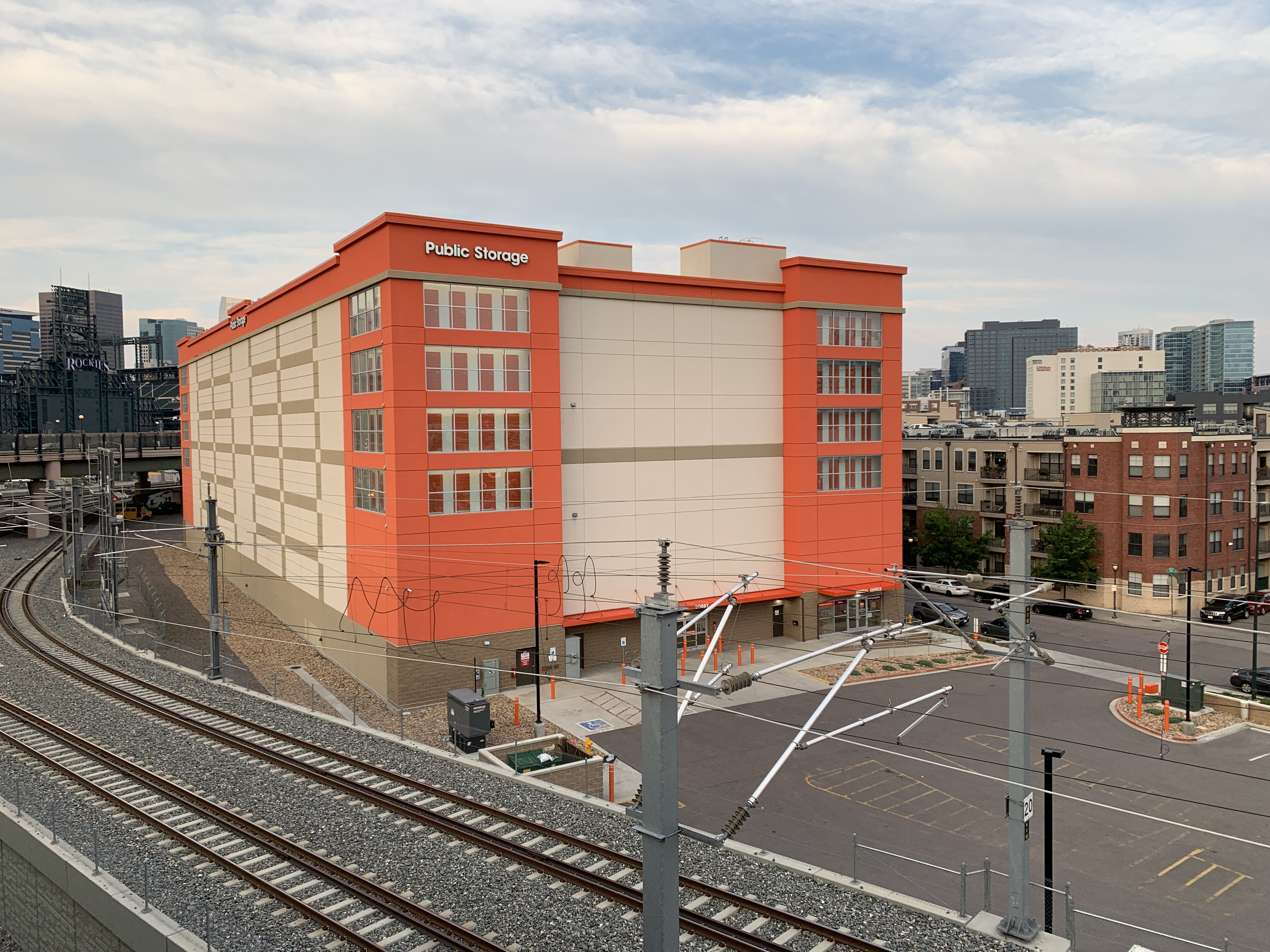
Public Storage Building

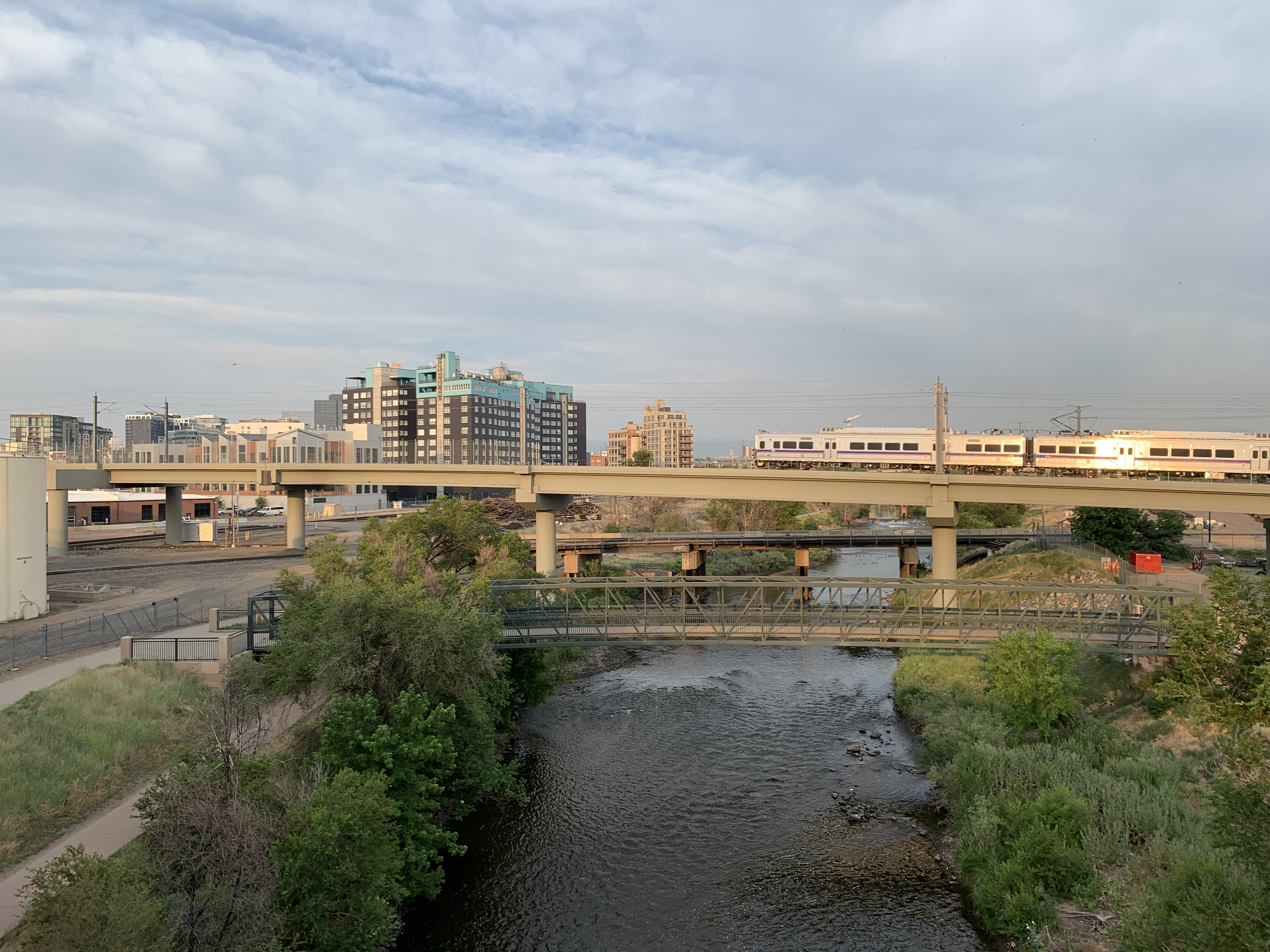
South Platte Bridges. Top to bottom, G Line commuter rail, BNSF rail, pedestrian bridge linking pedestrian trails.

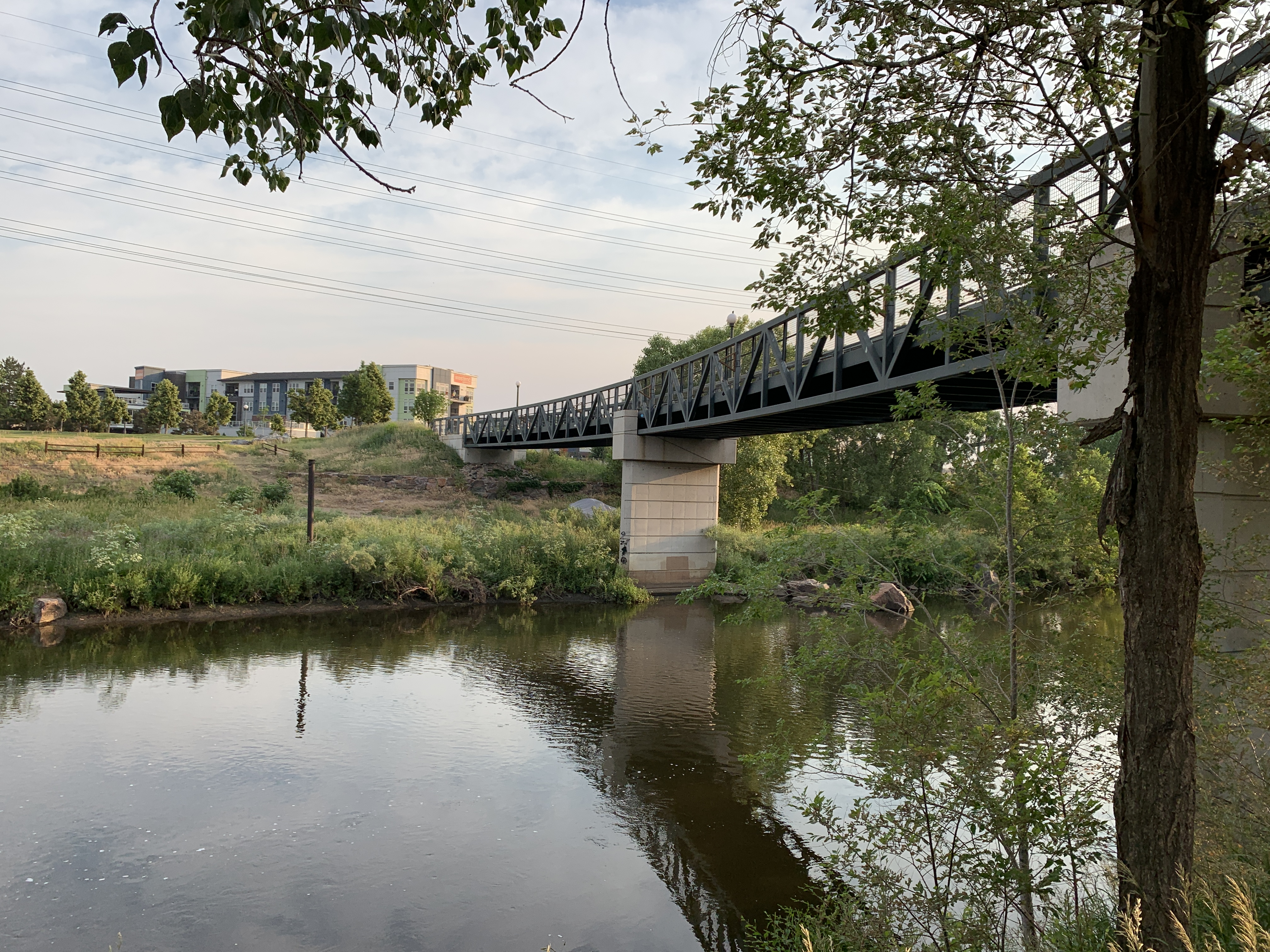
Cuernavaca Park Bridge

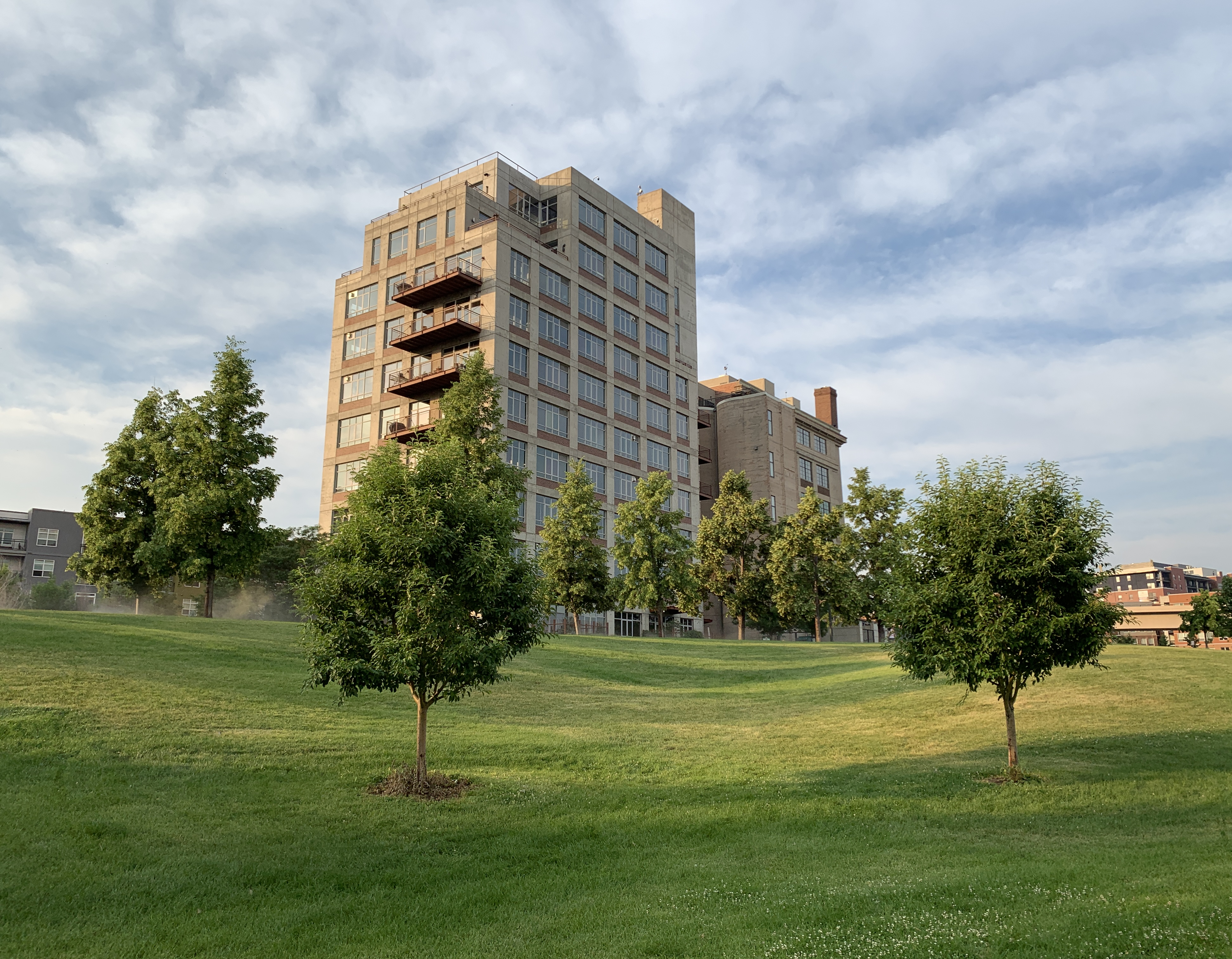
Flour Mill Lofts

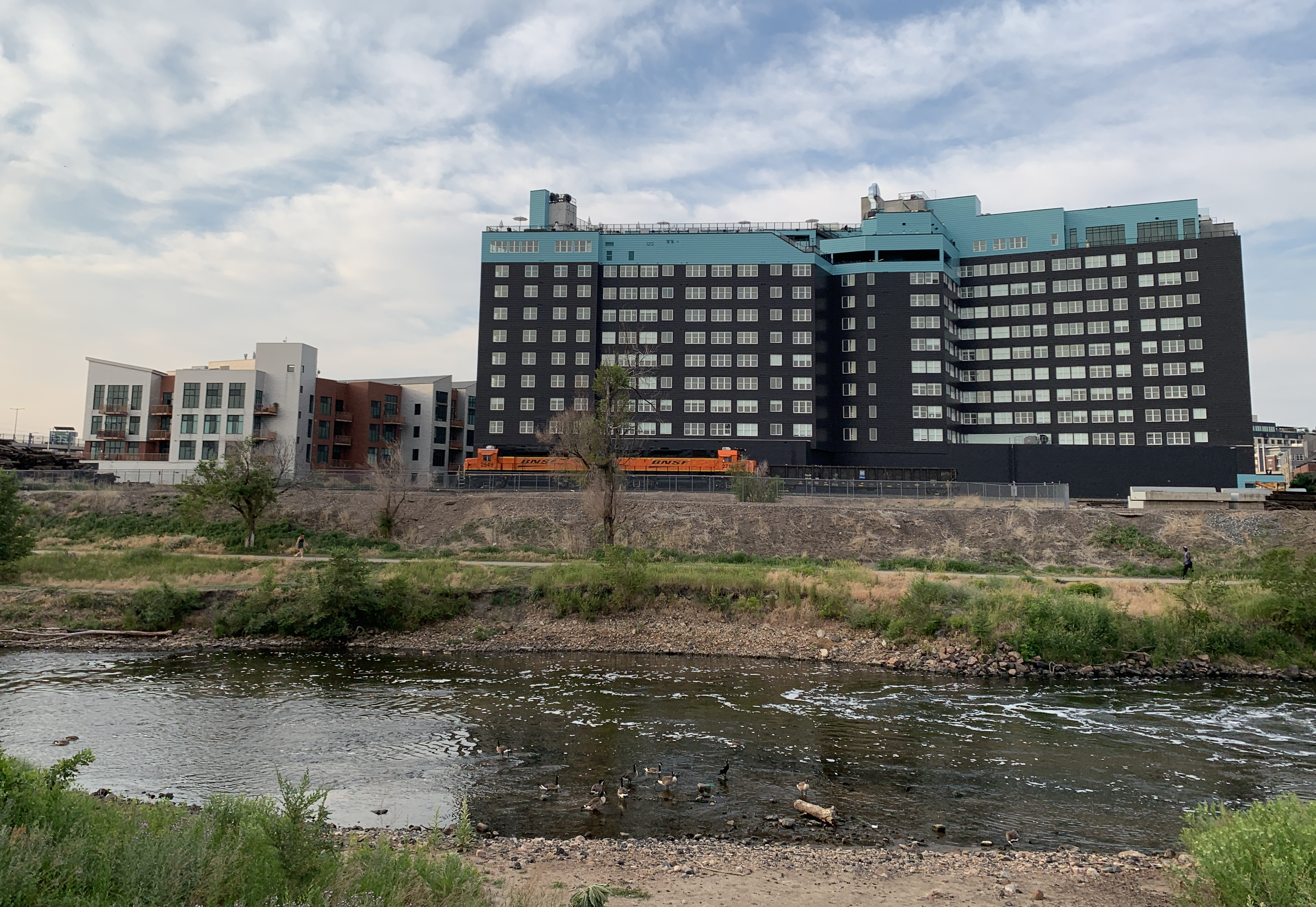
Jack Kerouac Lofts (left) and X Denver Apartments

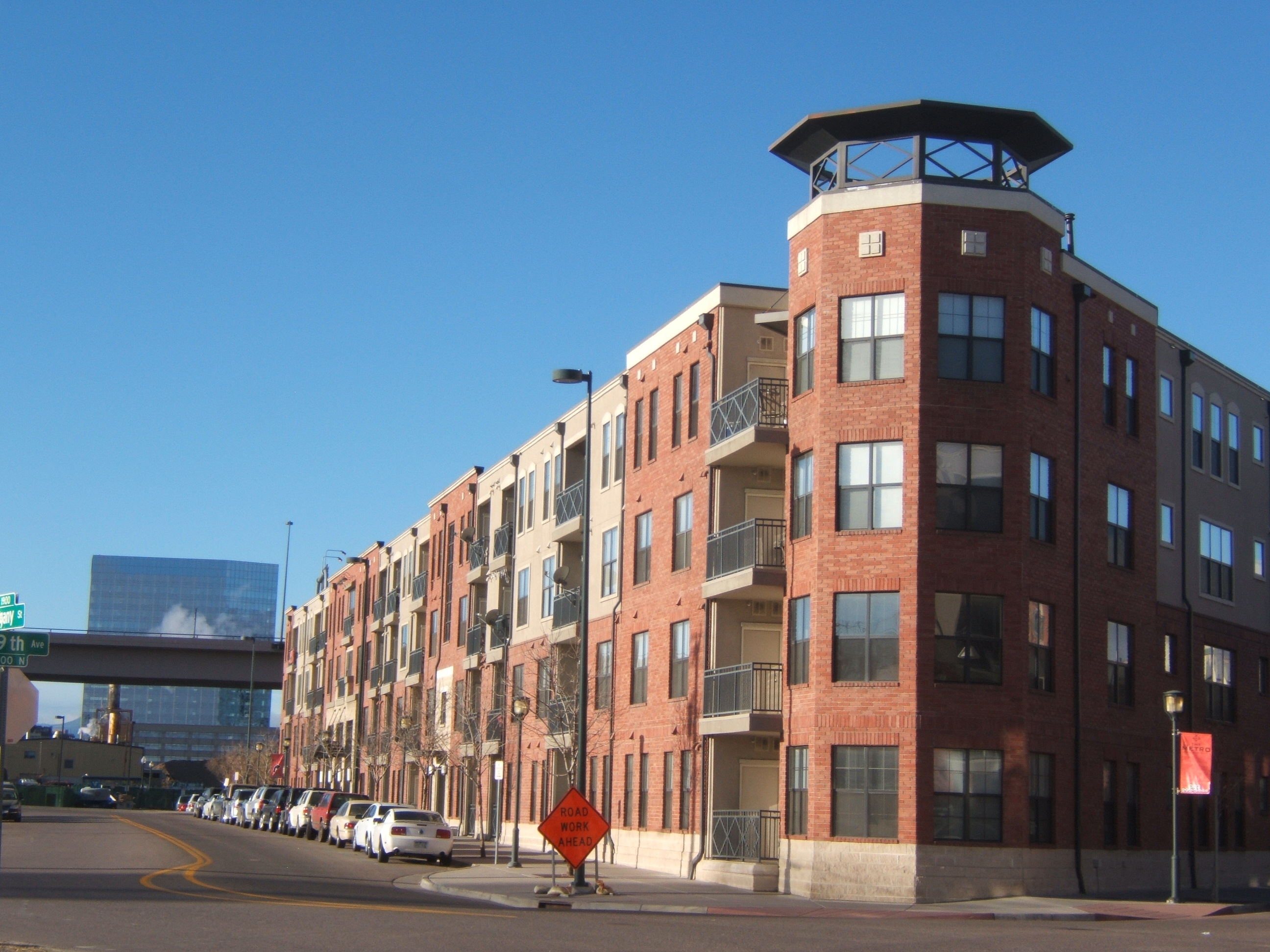
The Metro Apartments, building 1

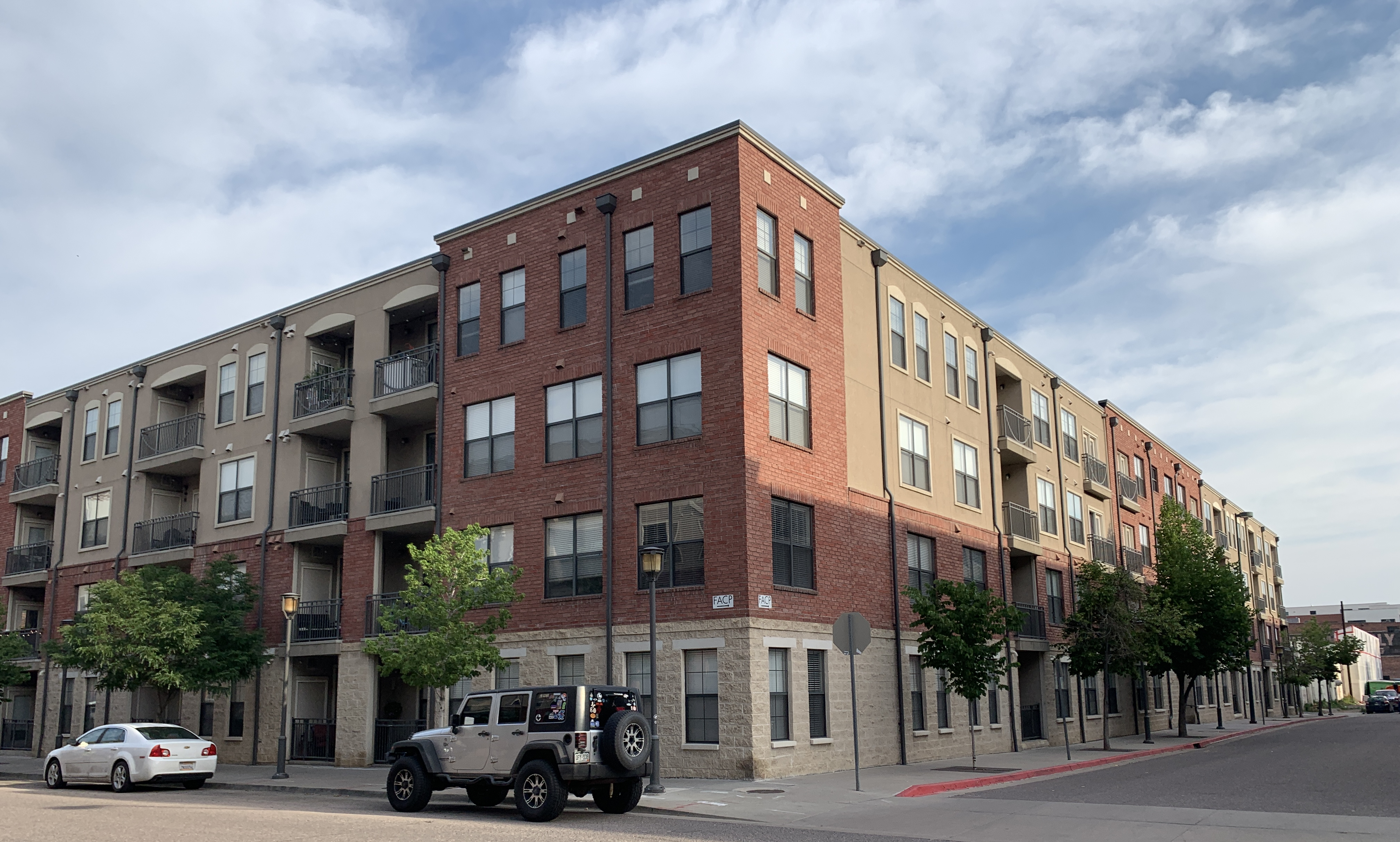
The Metro Apartments, building 2

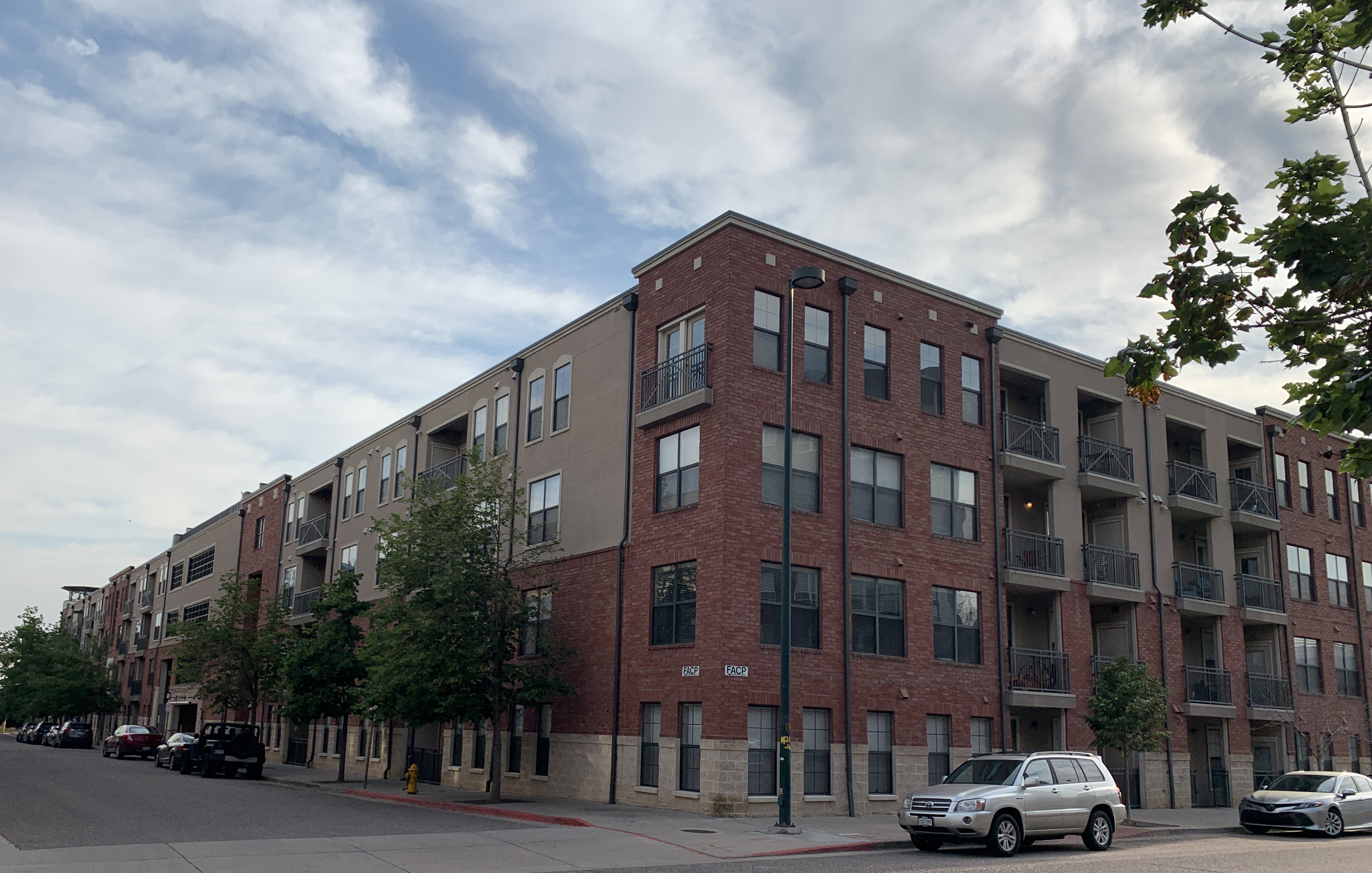
The Metro Apartments, building 3

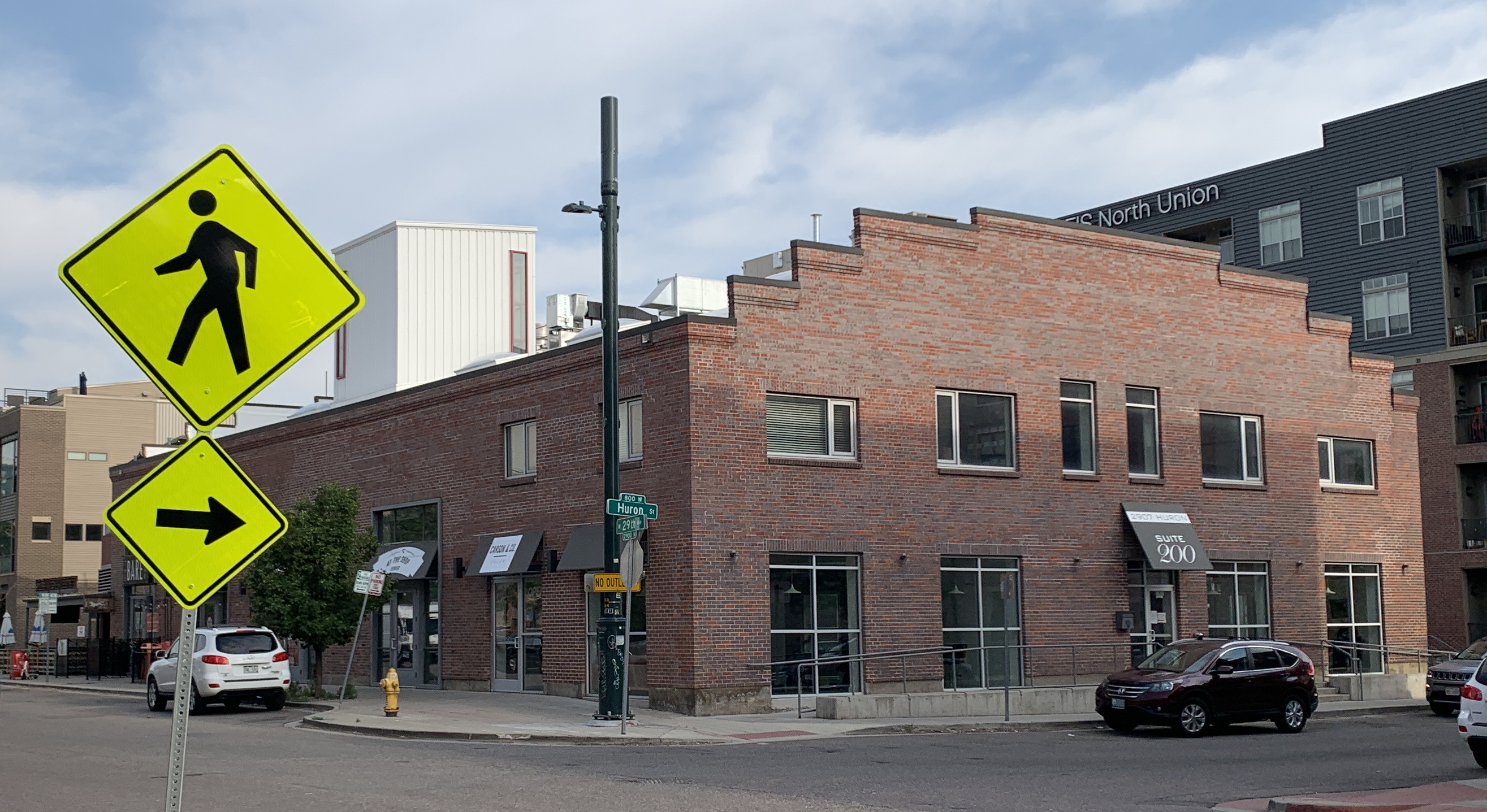
Shops & Restaurants

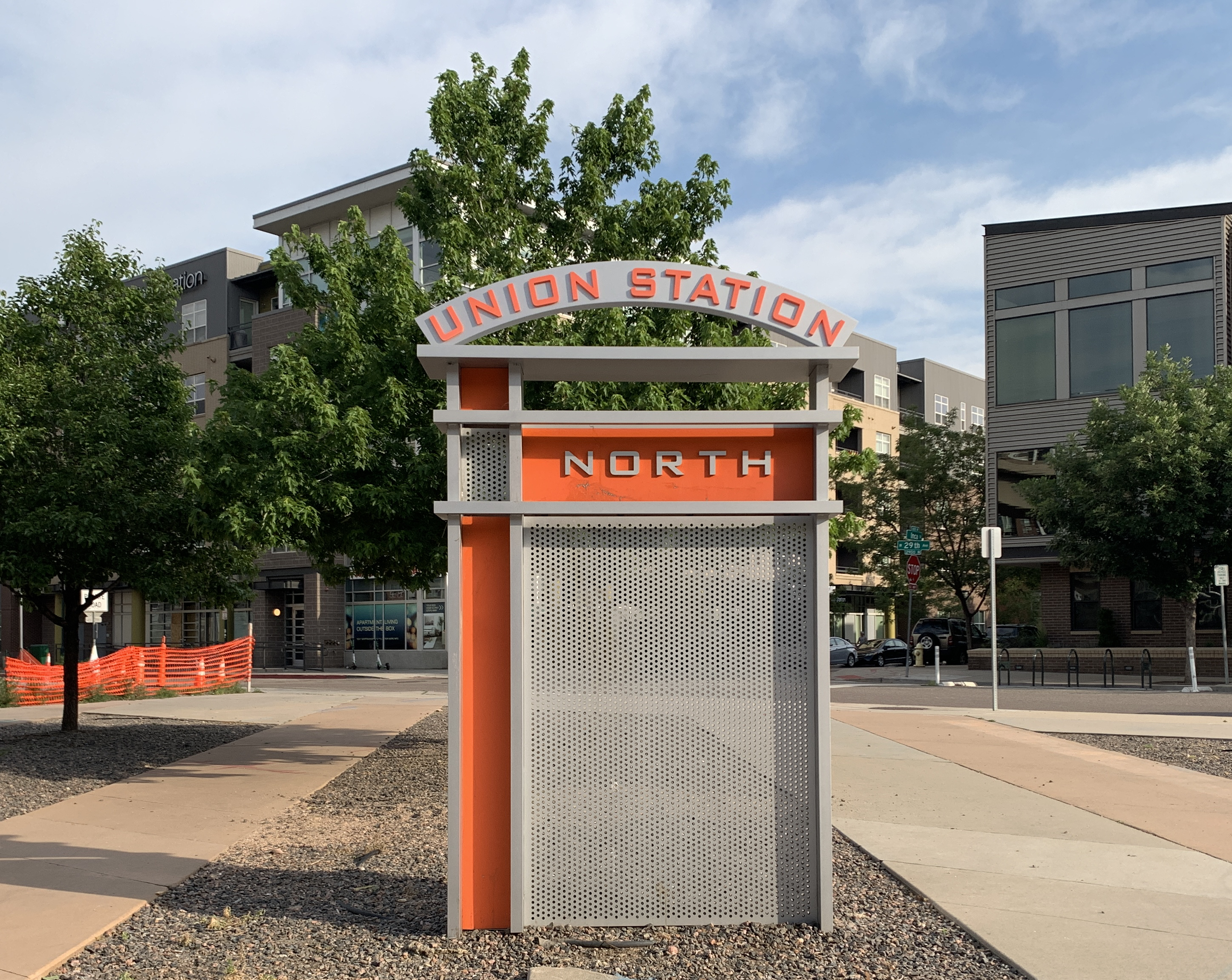
Union Station North Sign

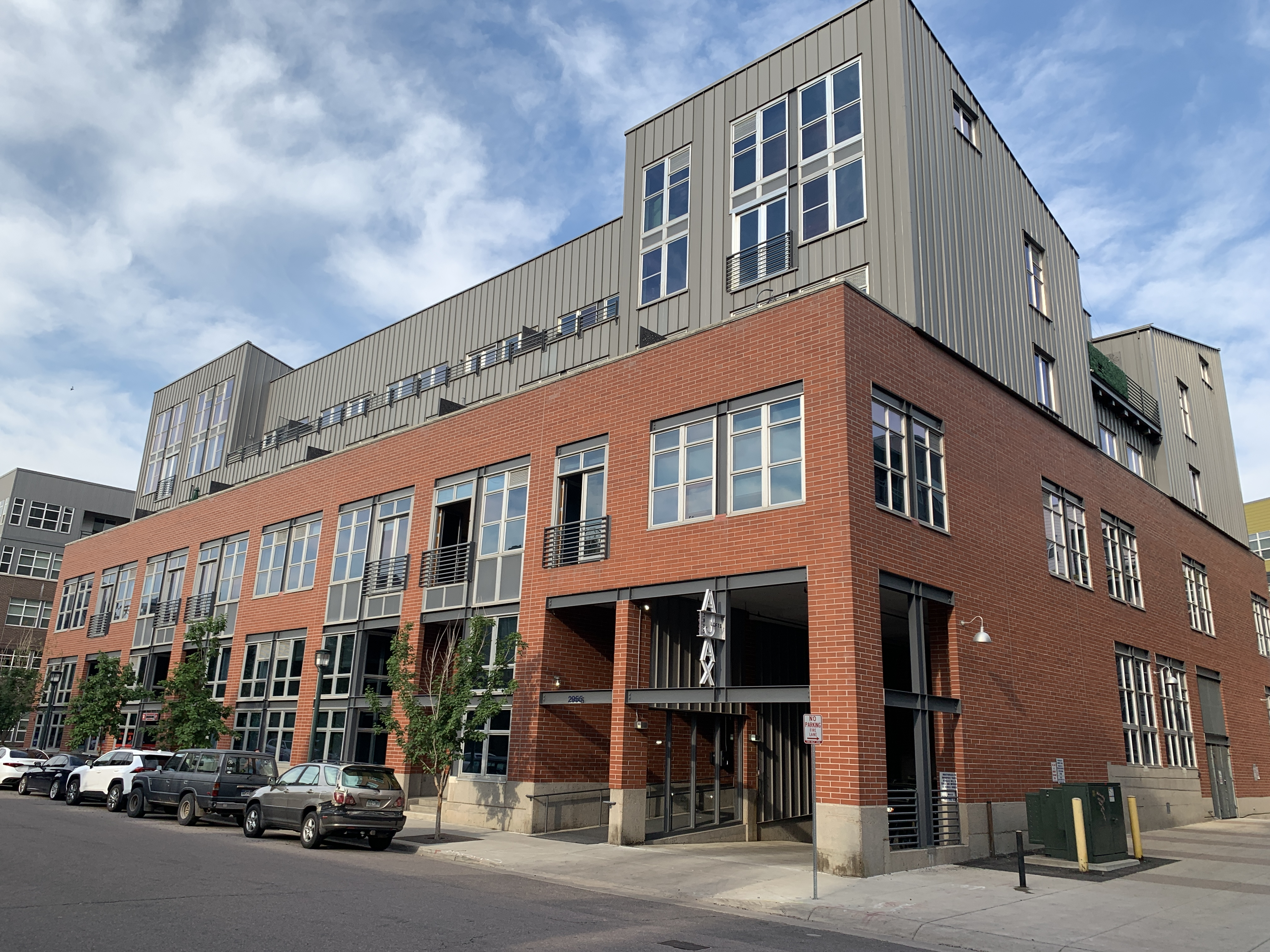
Ajax Lofts

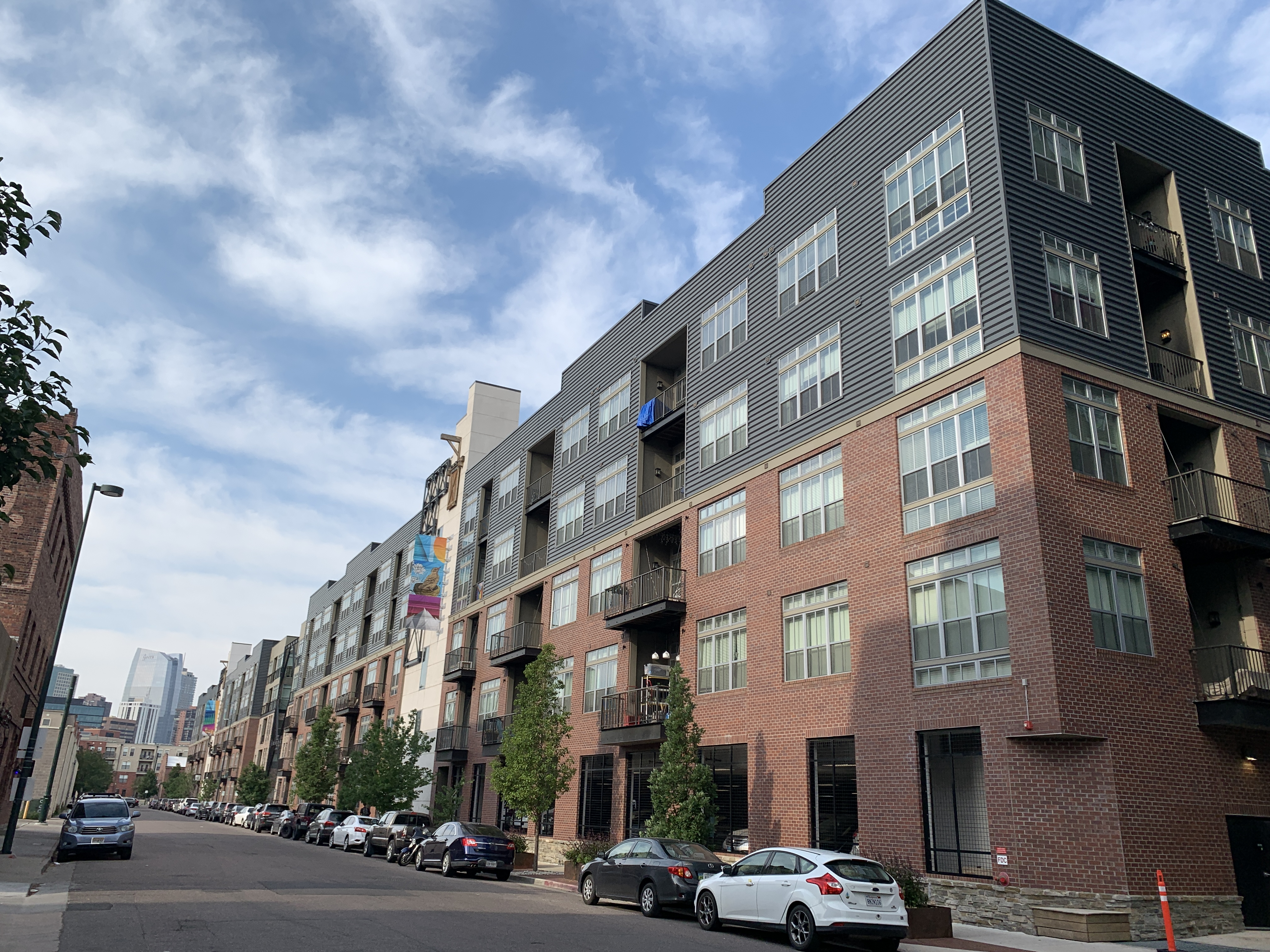
Griffis North Union Apartments

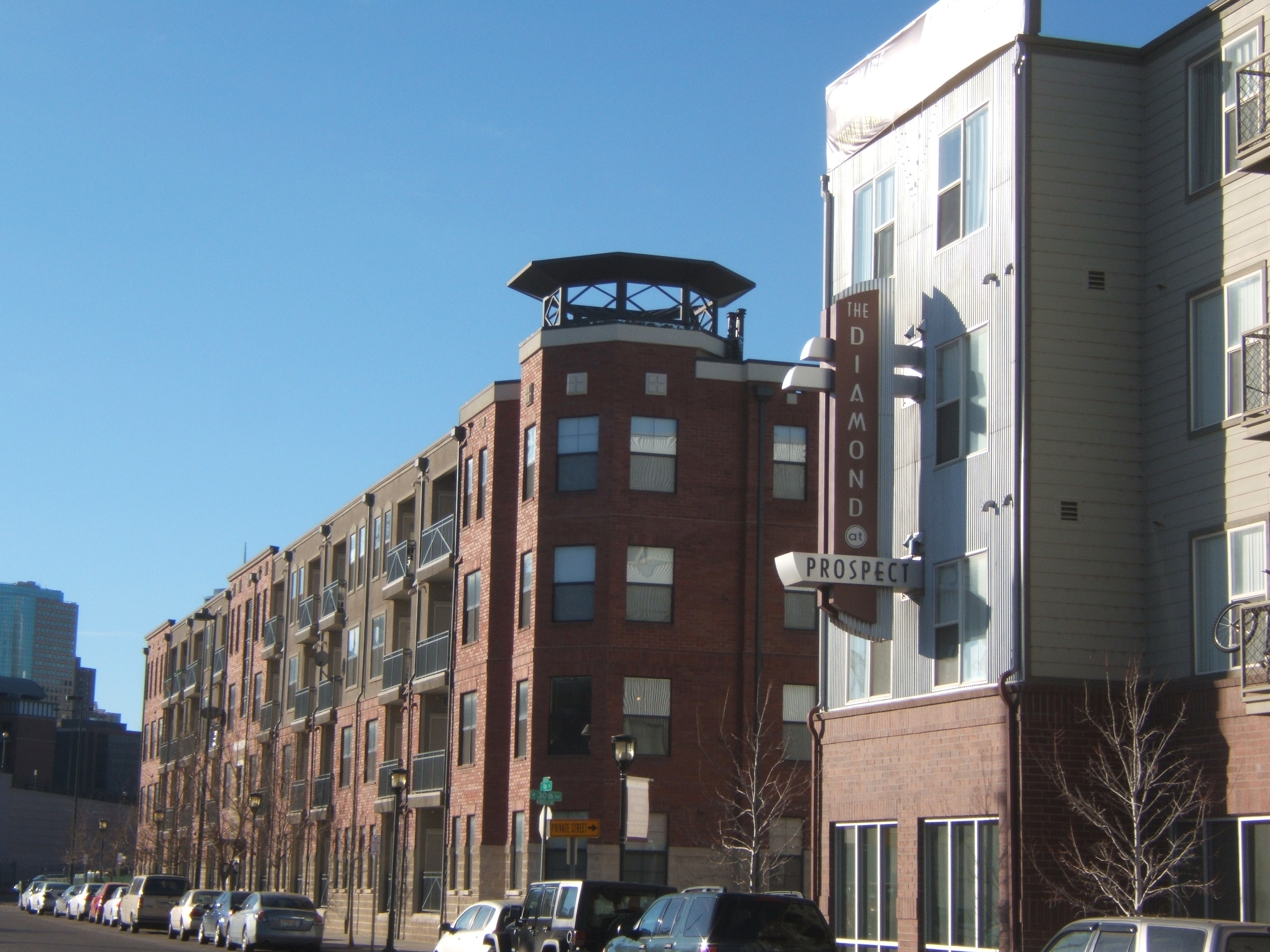
Diamond at Prospect Apartments (right)

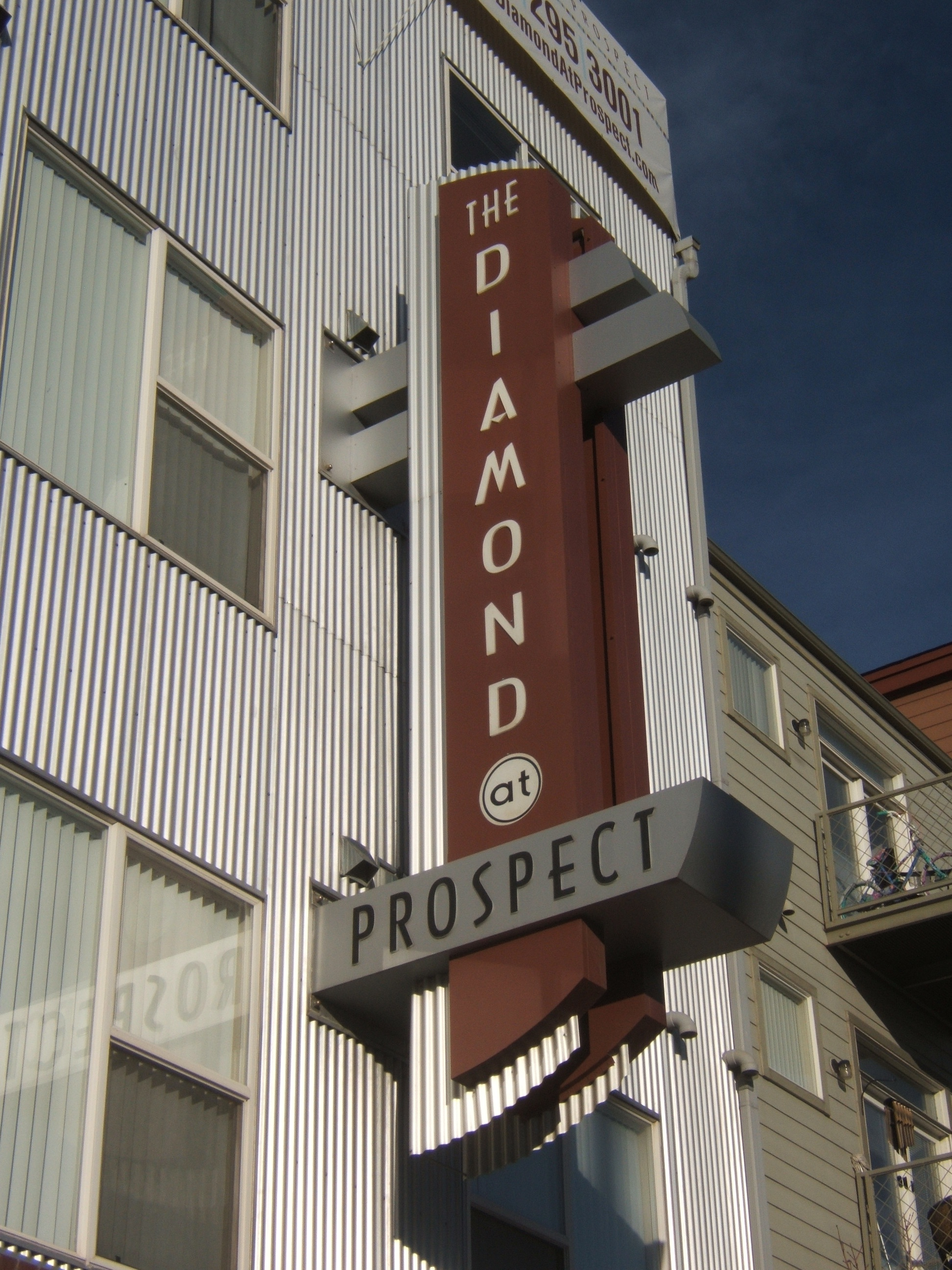
Diamond at Prospect Apartments

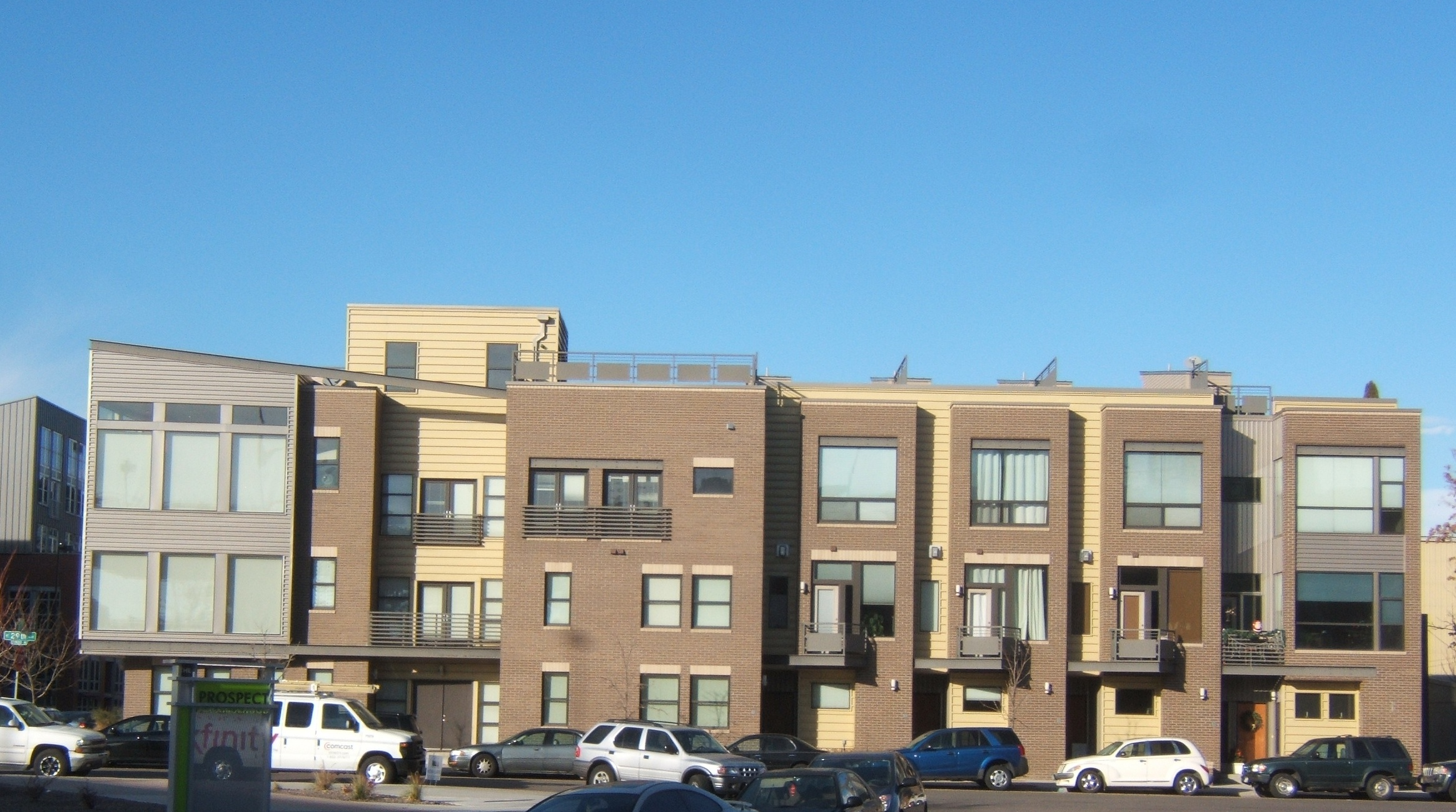
Inca 29 Brownstones

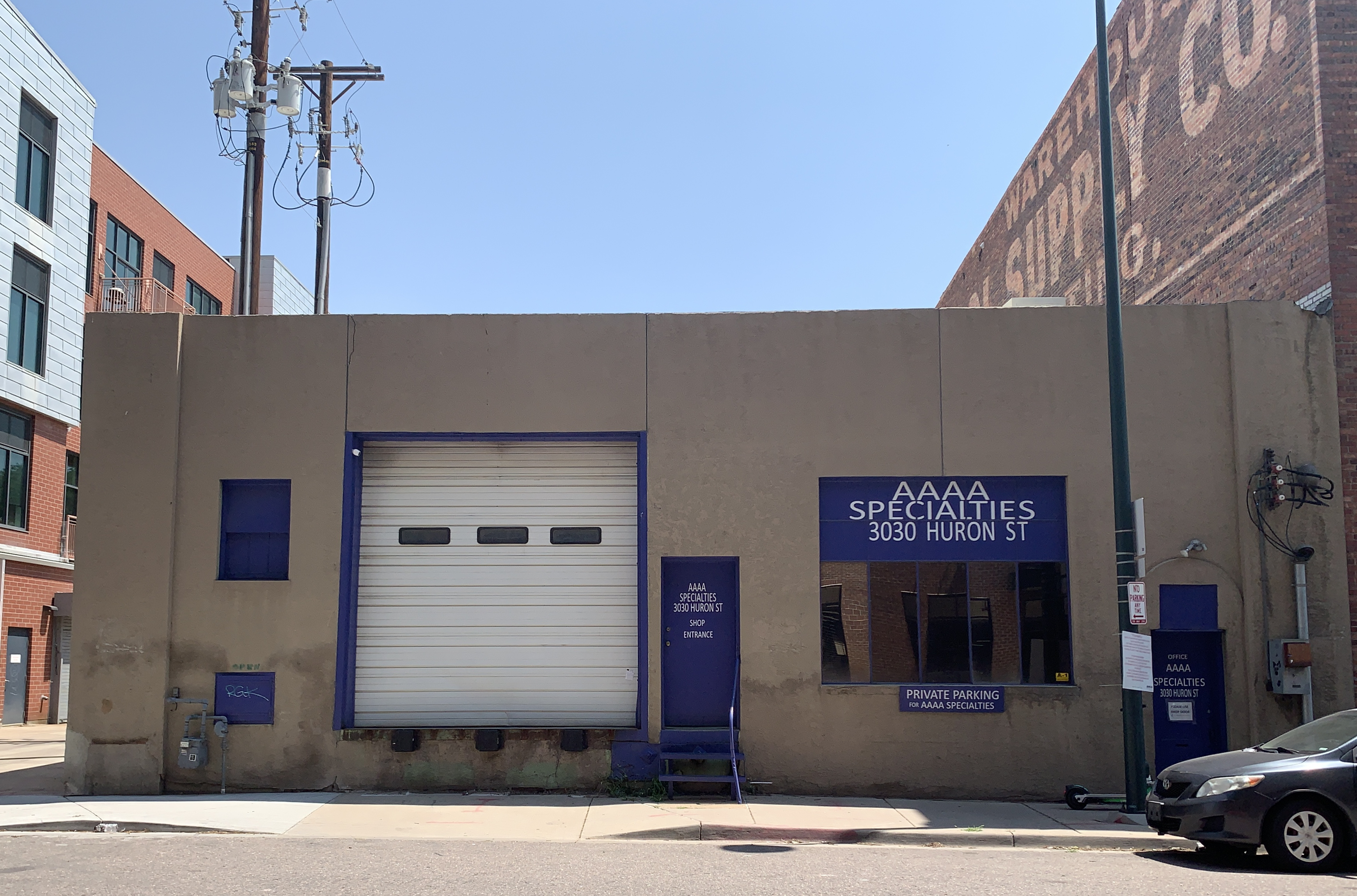
3030 Huron Street

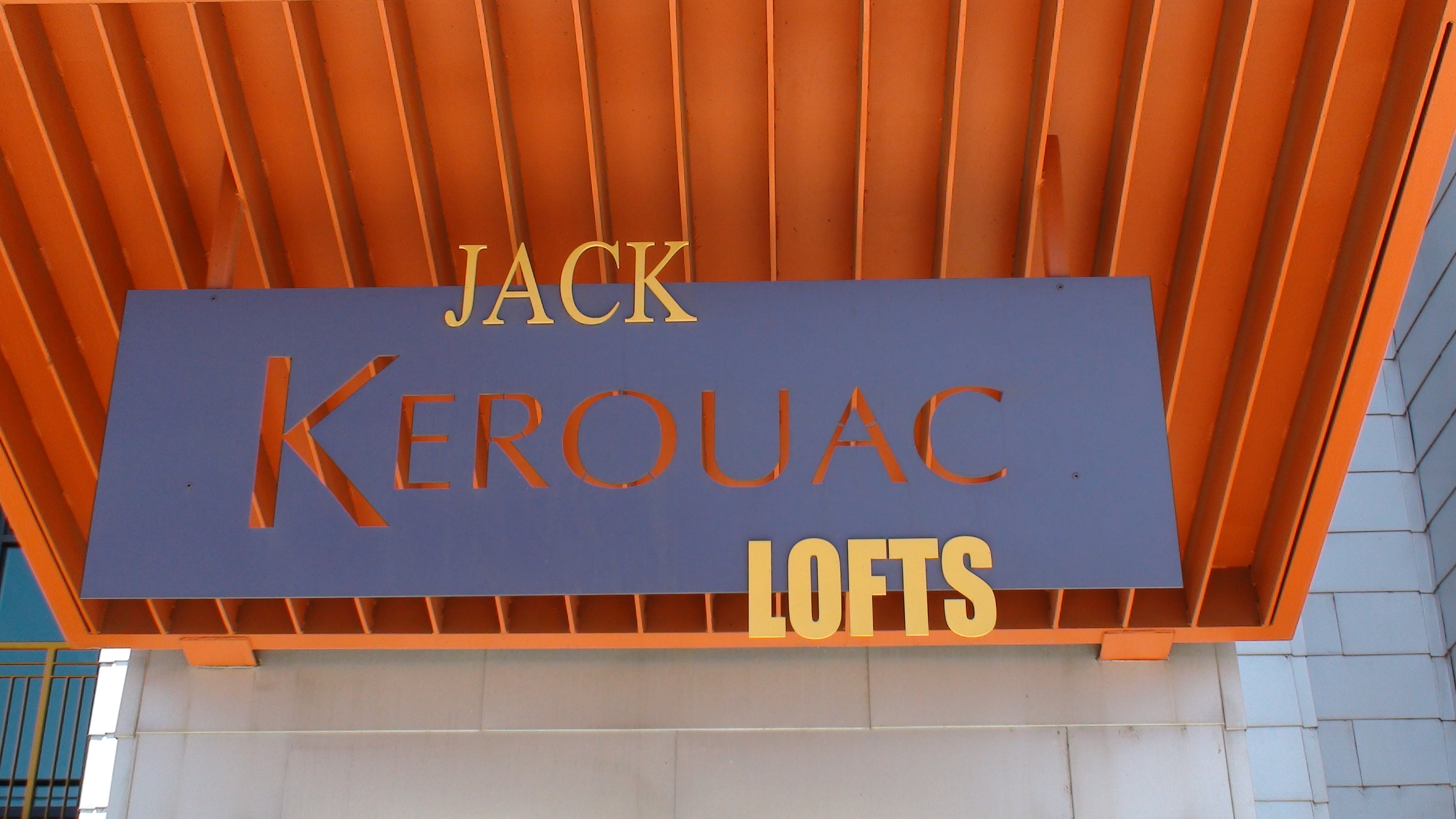
Entrance to Jack Kerouac Lofts

== Union Station North historical images ==
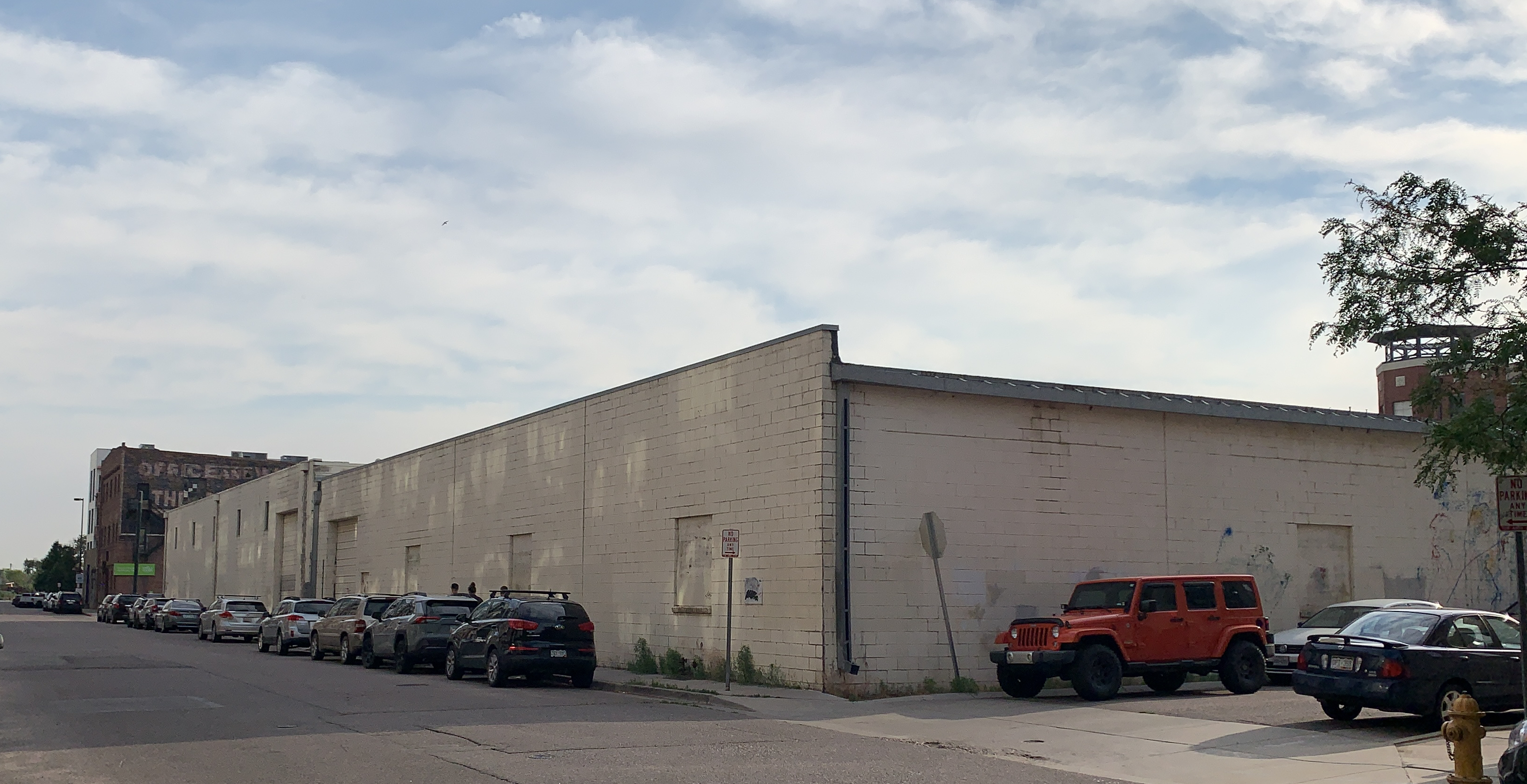
2980 Huron Street was razed to make way for the 3000 Huron Street Project

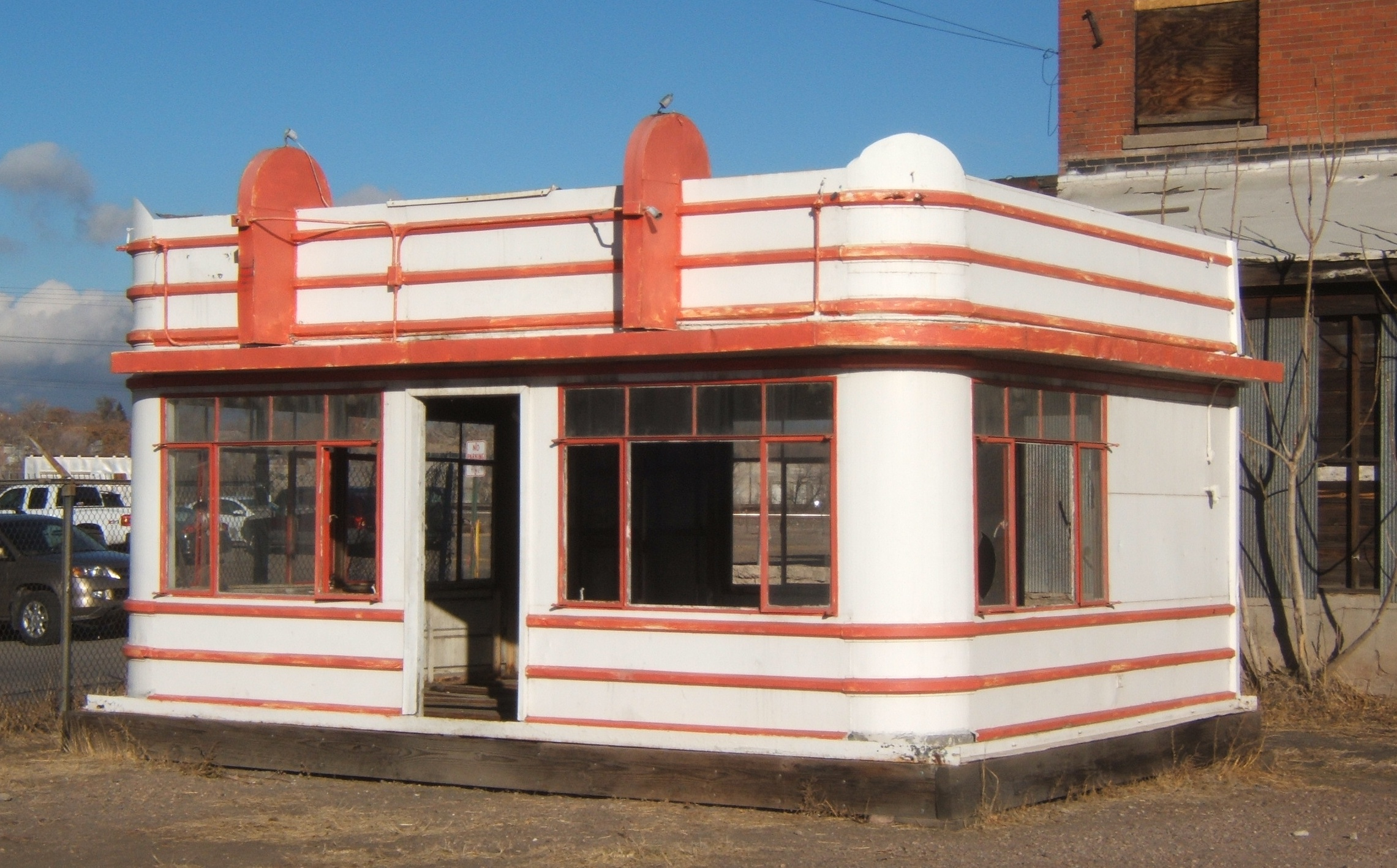
Small shop in a vacant lot which was removed to make way for Griffis North Union

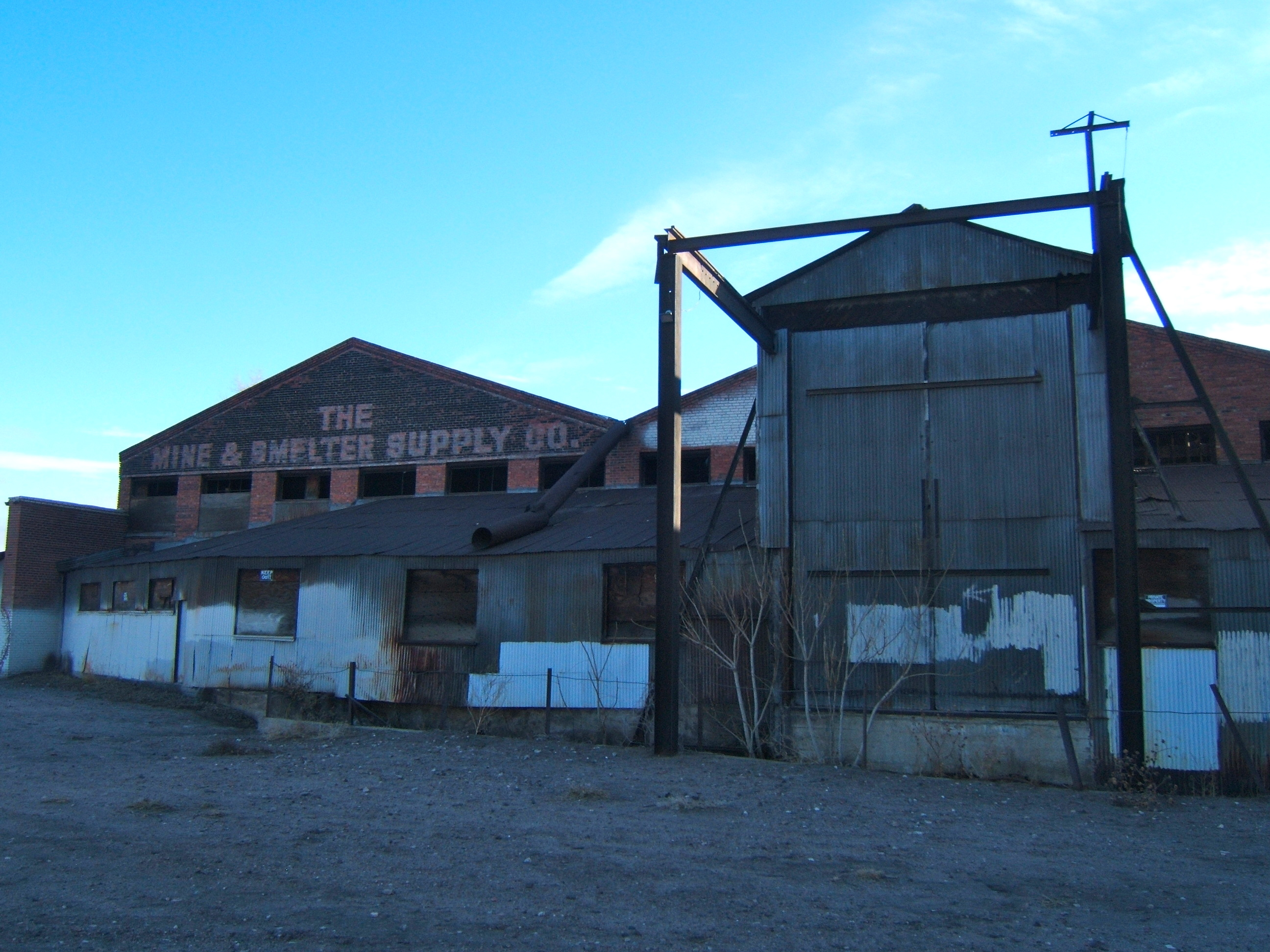
North end of Inca Street looking northeast. This building was demolished to make way for X Denver 1 & 2

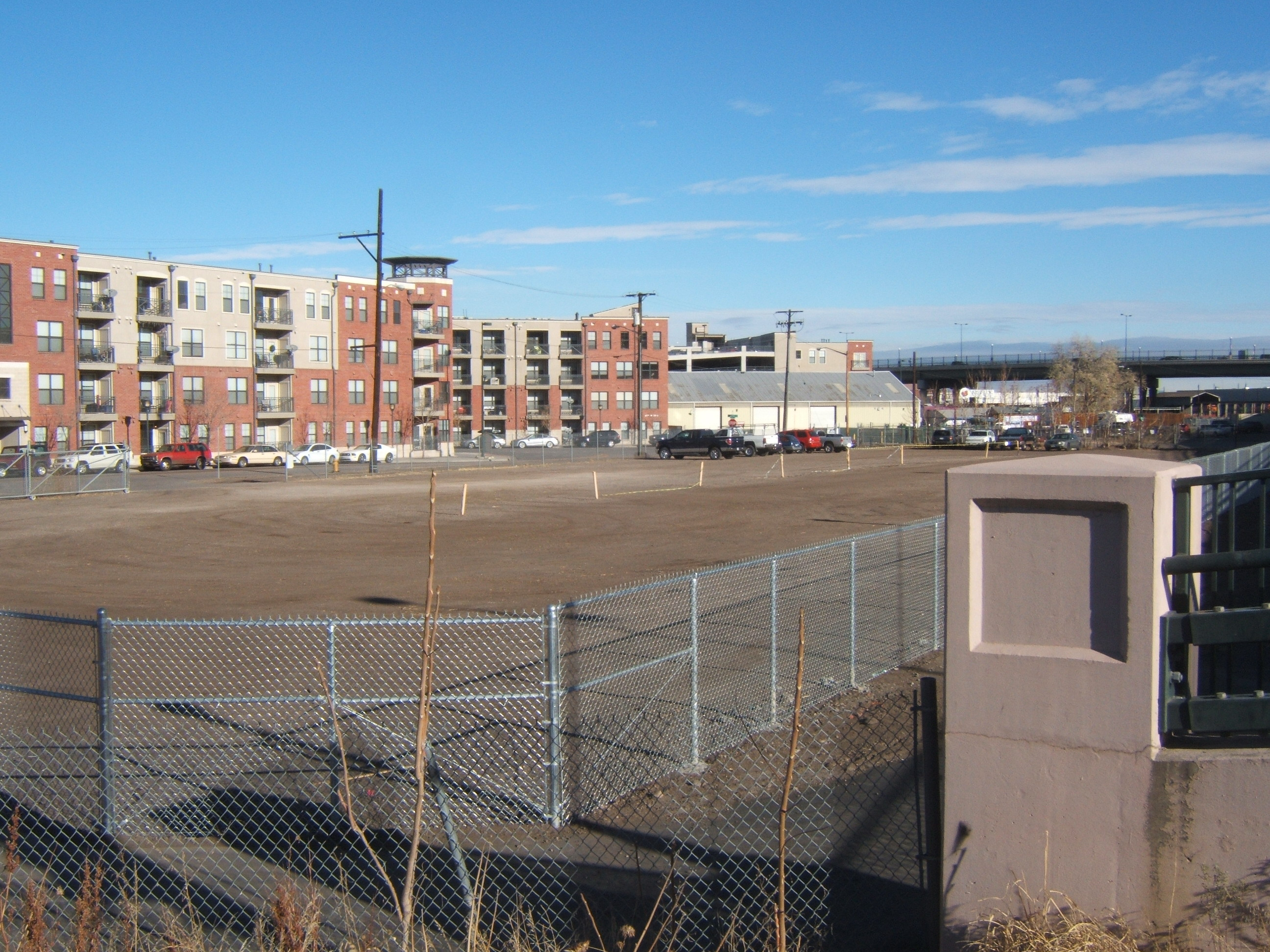
Empty lot prior to The Casey being built, looking northeast

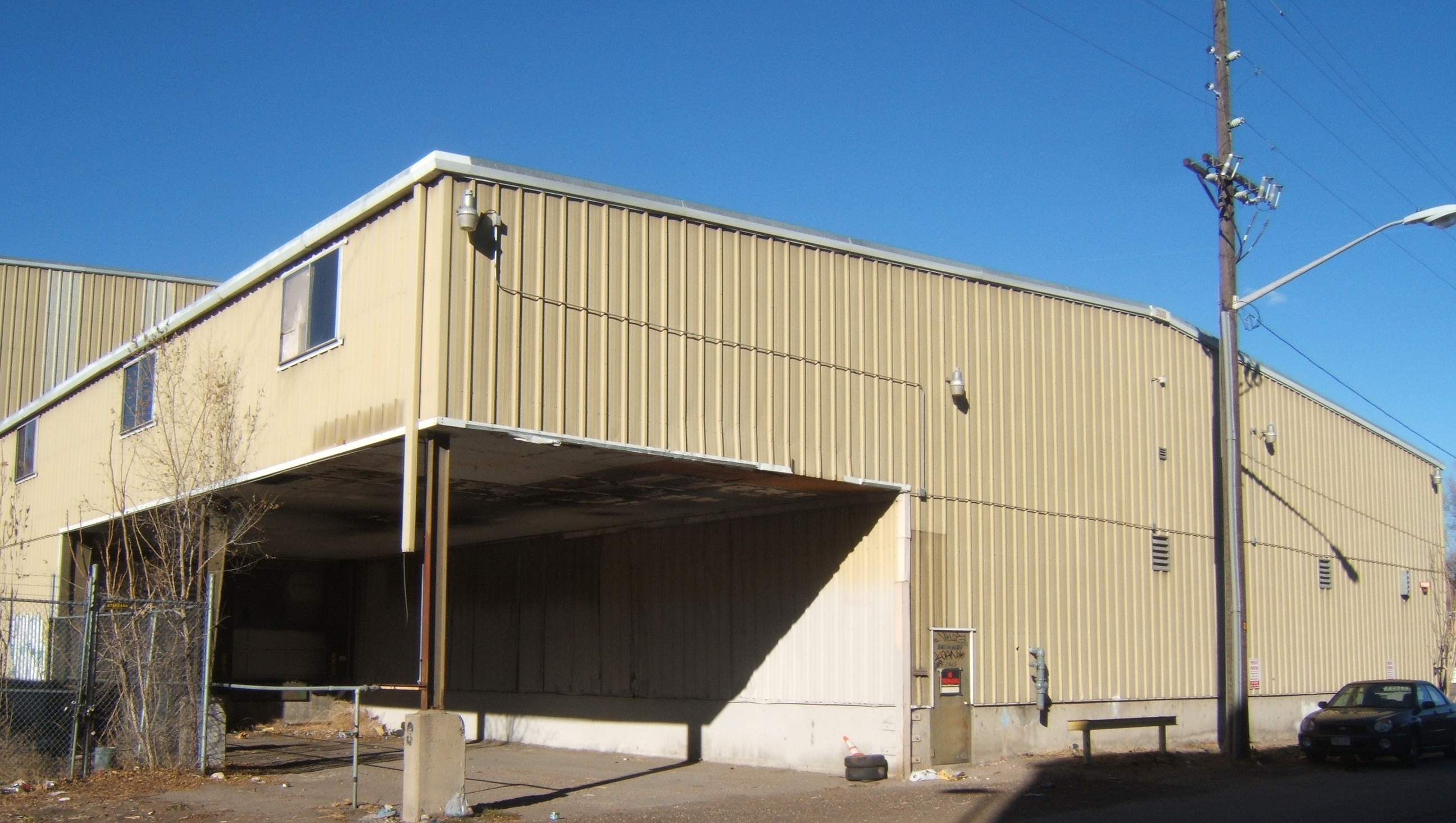
Empty warehouse just north of 2907 Huron Street. Later demolished for Griffis North Union.

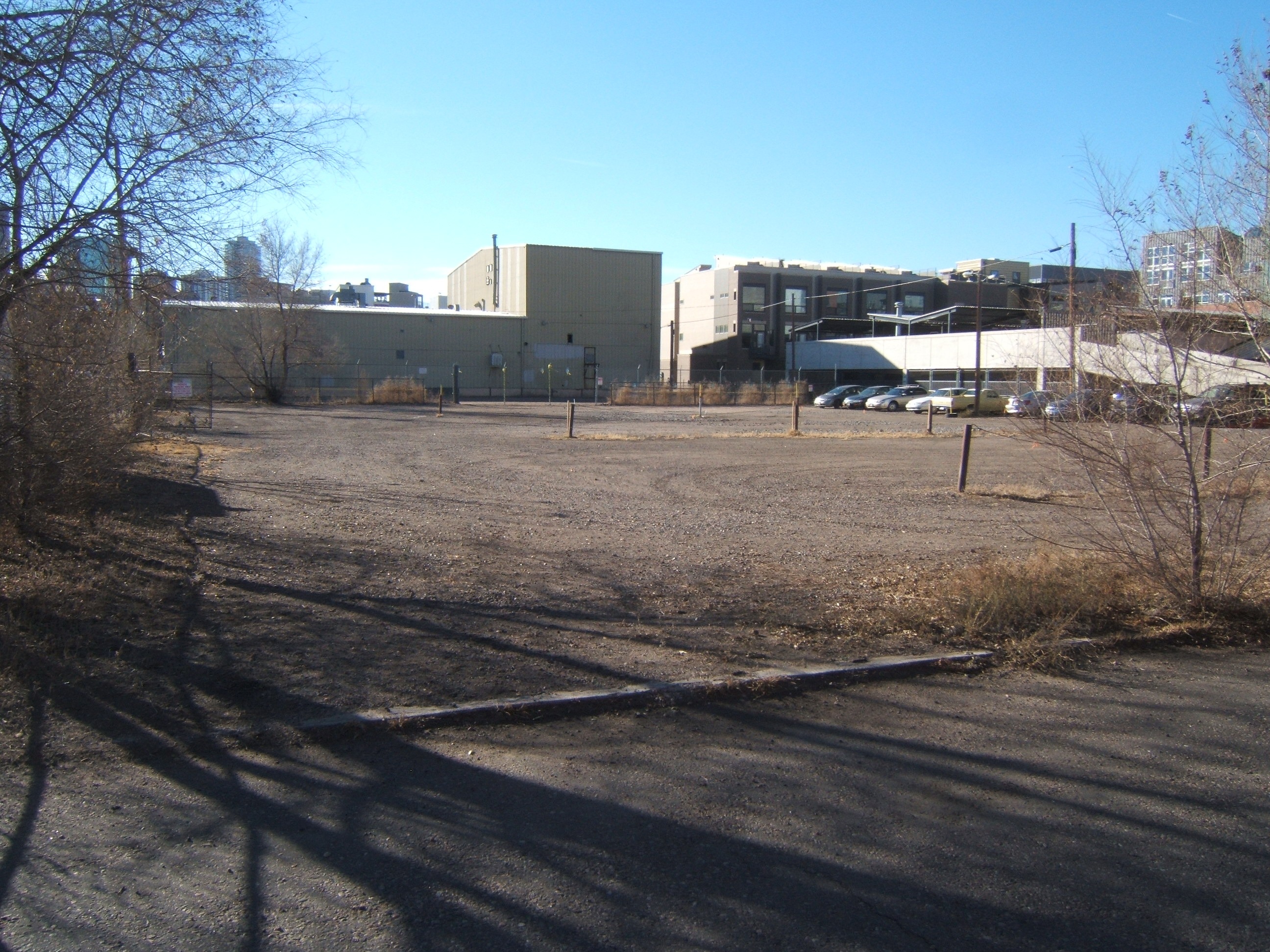
Empty lot Huron Street, later it was Griffis North Union

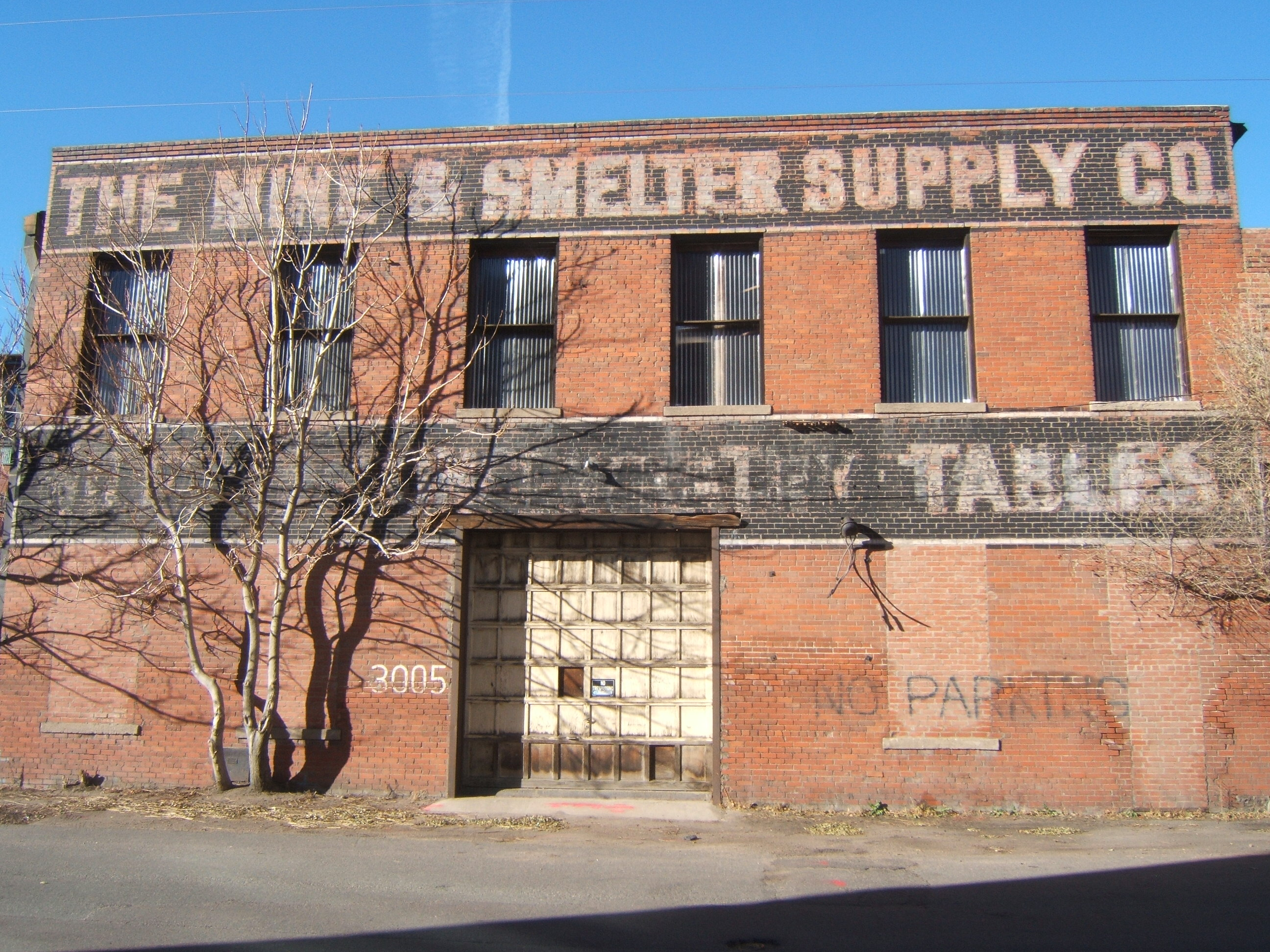
Empty warehouse that used to stand just west of Jack Kerouac Lofts. Later demolished for X Denver

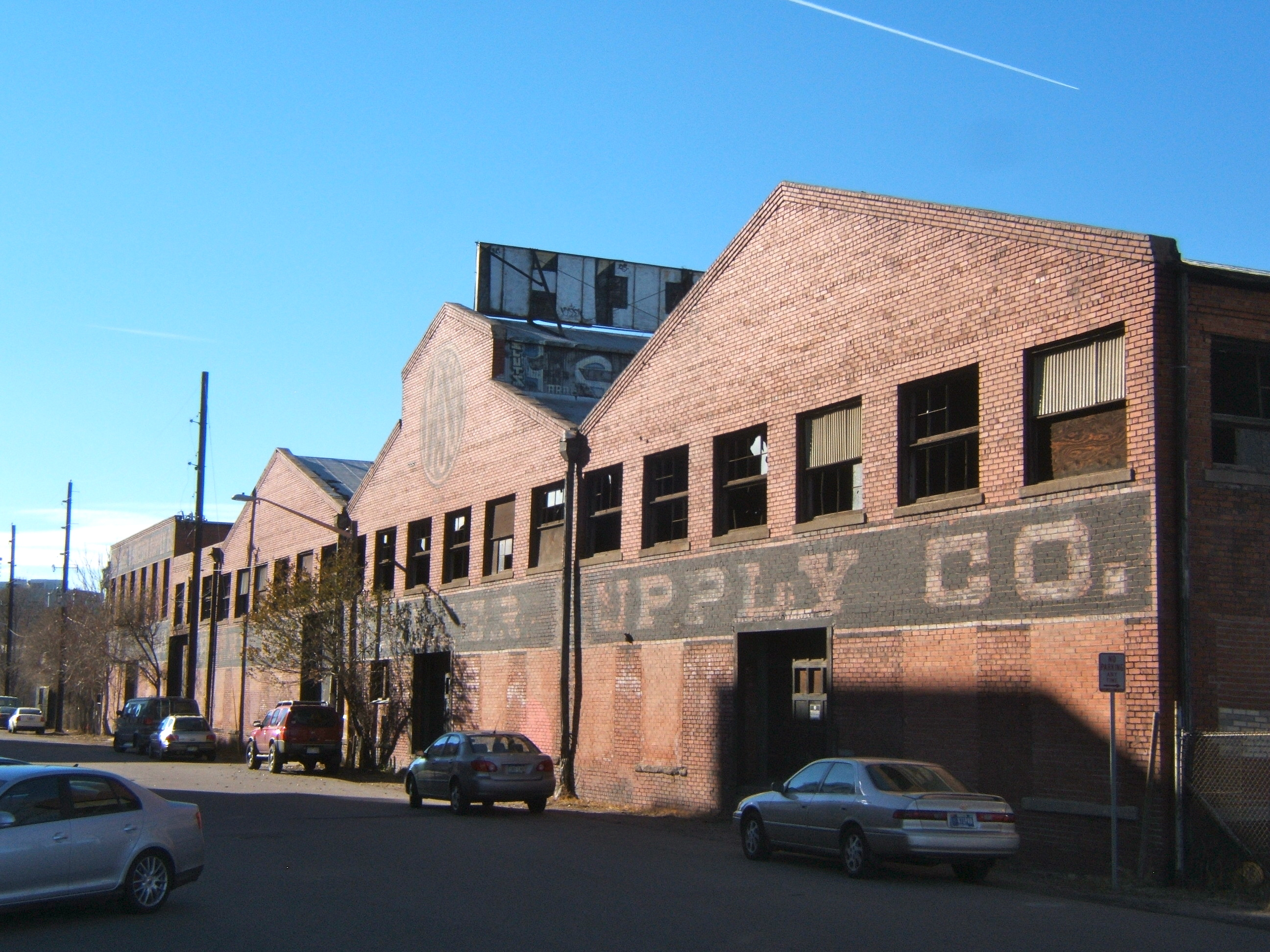
Empty warehouse that used to stand just west of Jack Kerouac Lofts. Later demolished for X Denver

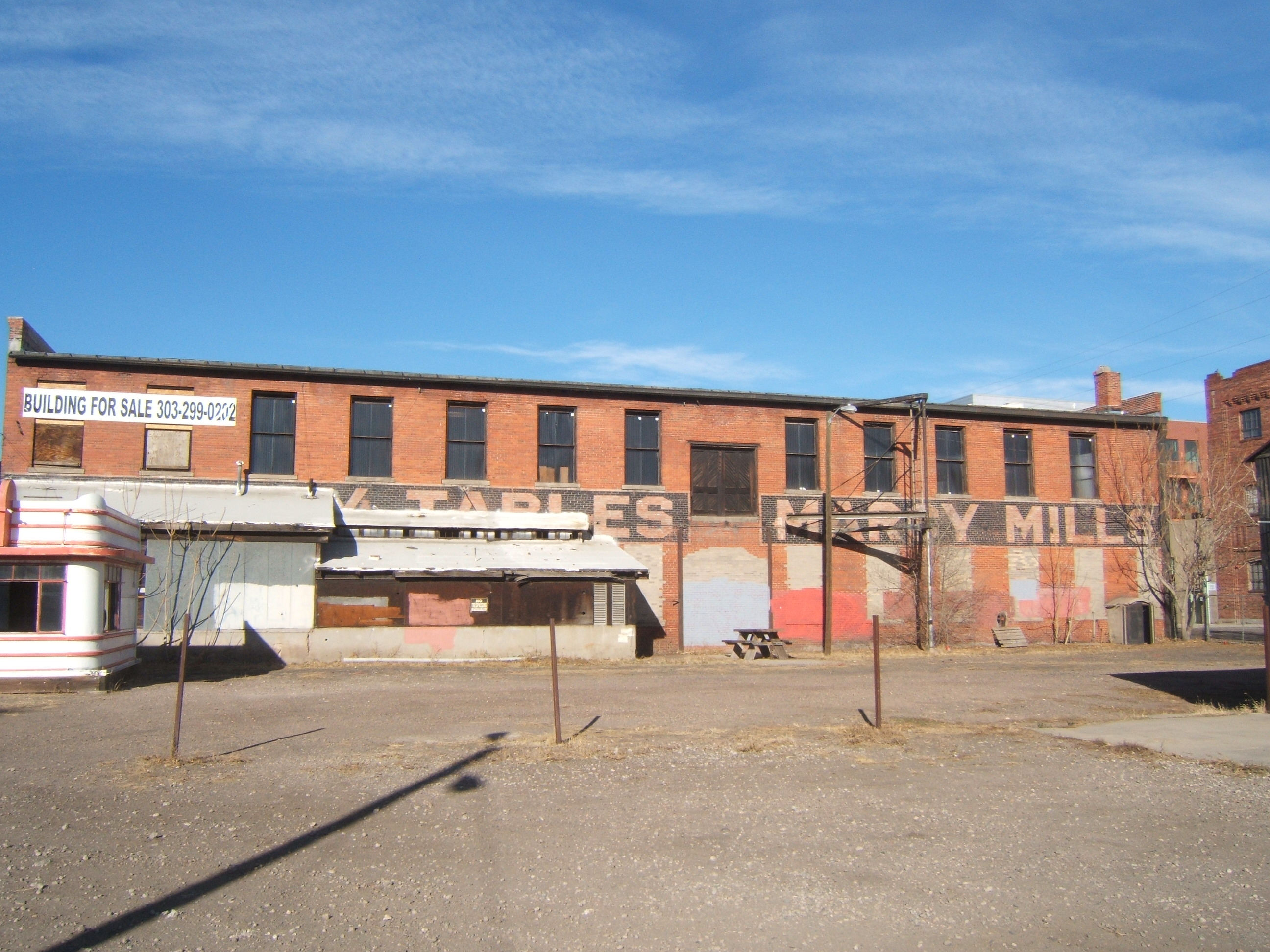
Empty warehouse that used to stand just west of Jack Kerouac Lofts. Later demolished for X Denver

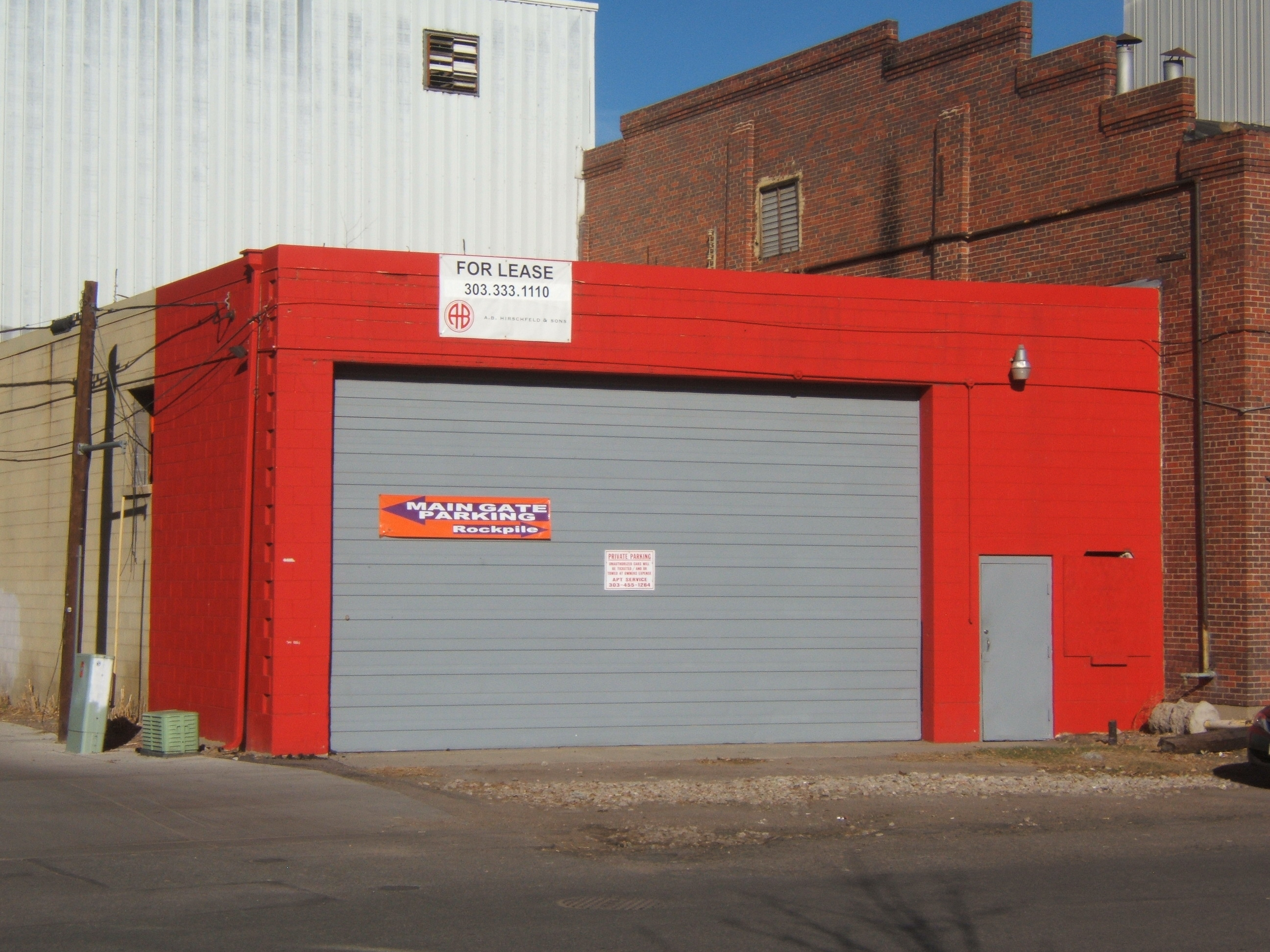
Building that used to stand at 2907 Huron Street. On the left is the alley between Huron and Inca Streets.

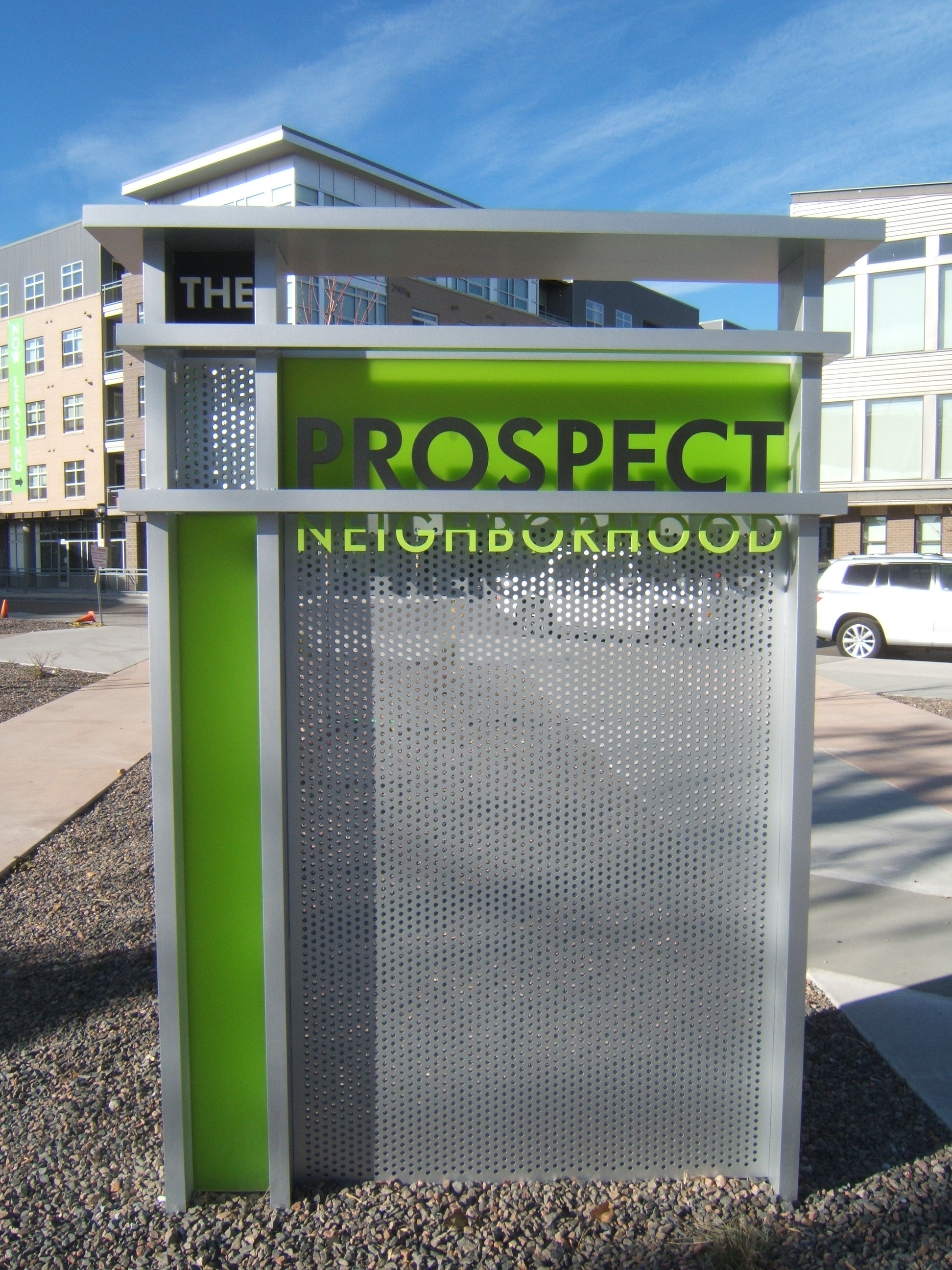
Old sign announcing entrance to Prospect Neighborhood; later named Union Station North

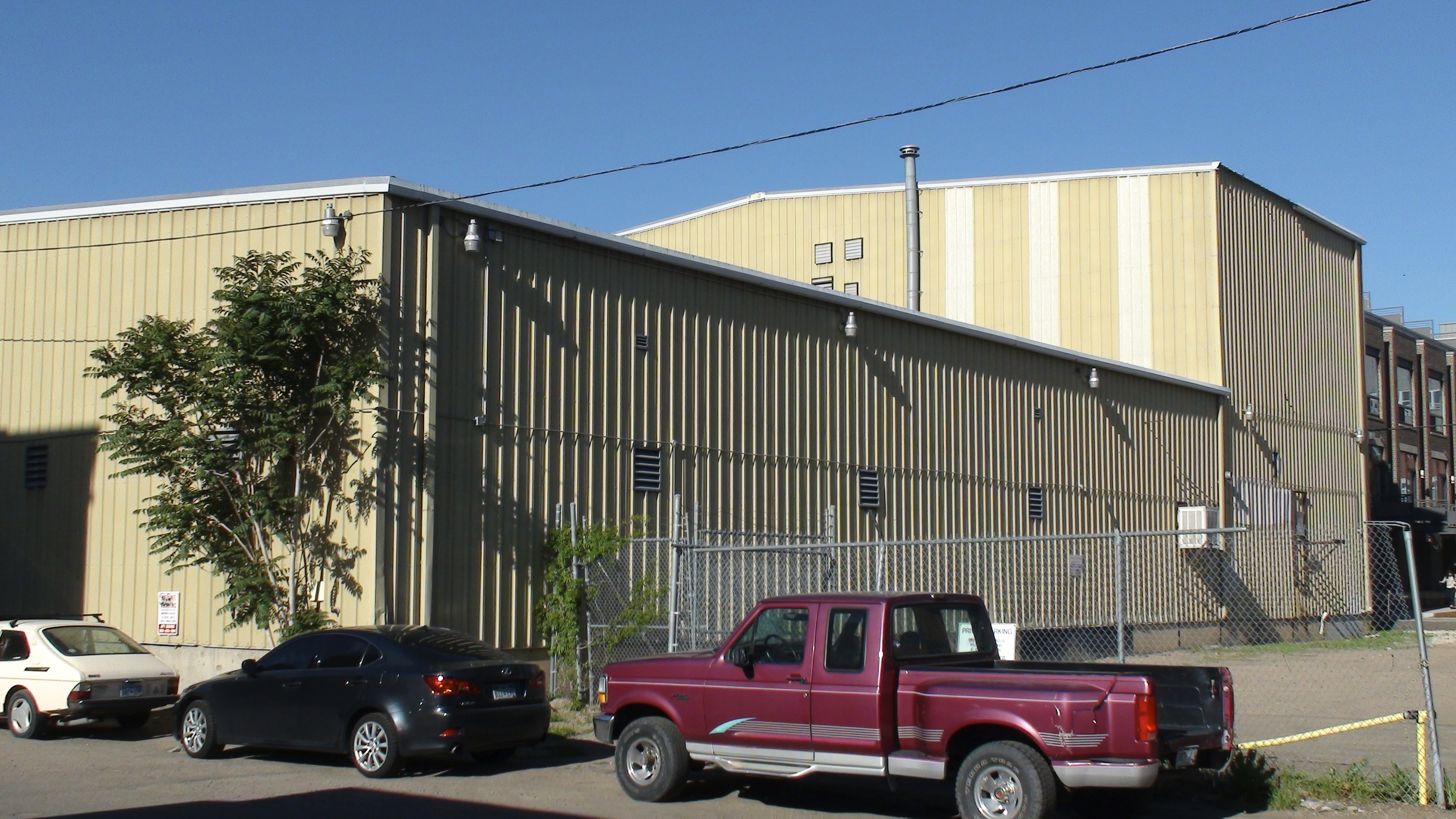
Empty warehouse just north of 2907 Huron Street. Later demolished for Griffis North Union.

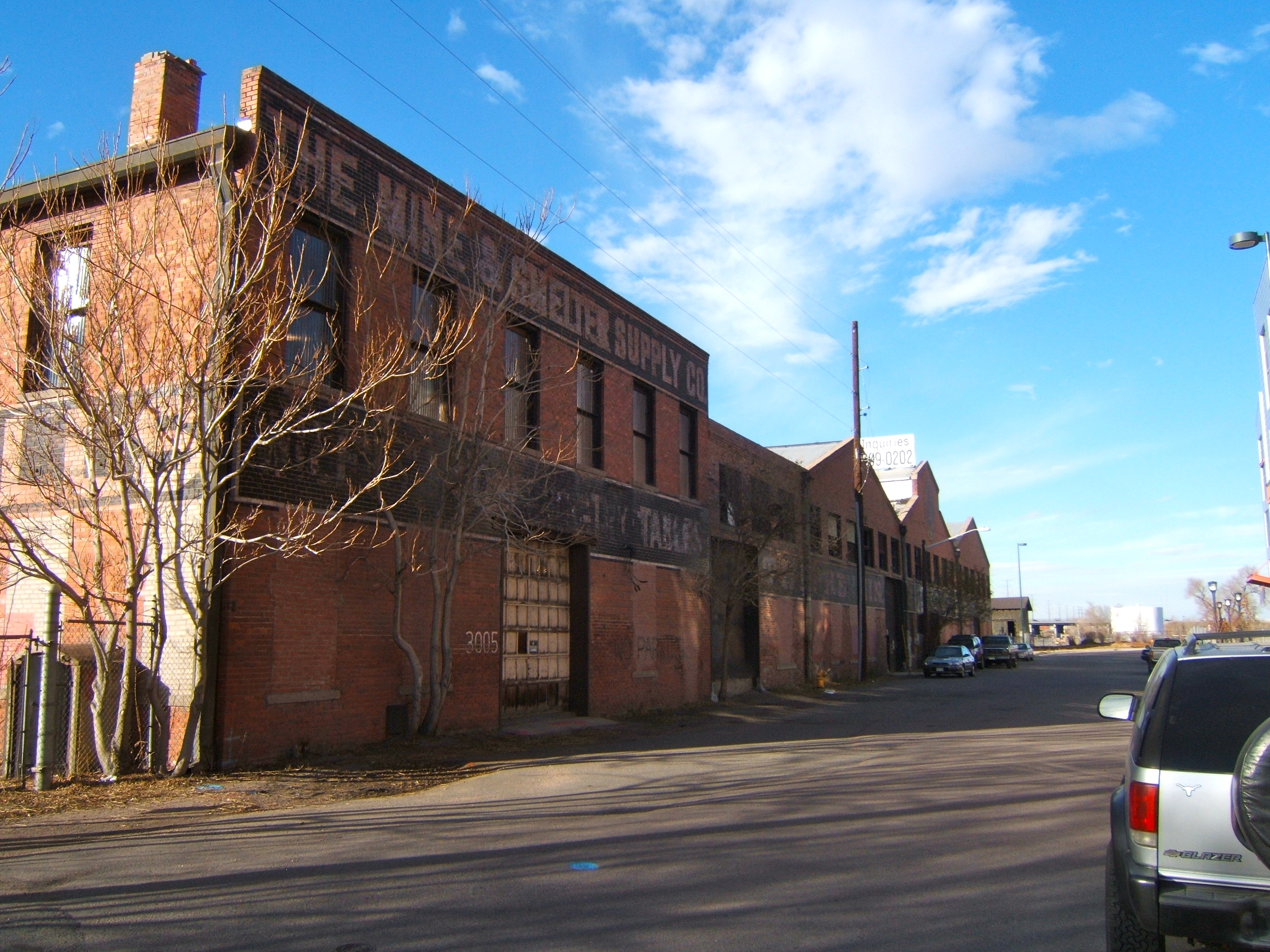
Warehouse that no longer exists which stood just west of the Jack Kerouac Lofts

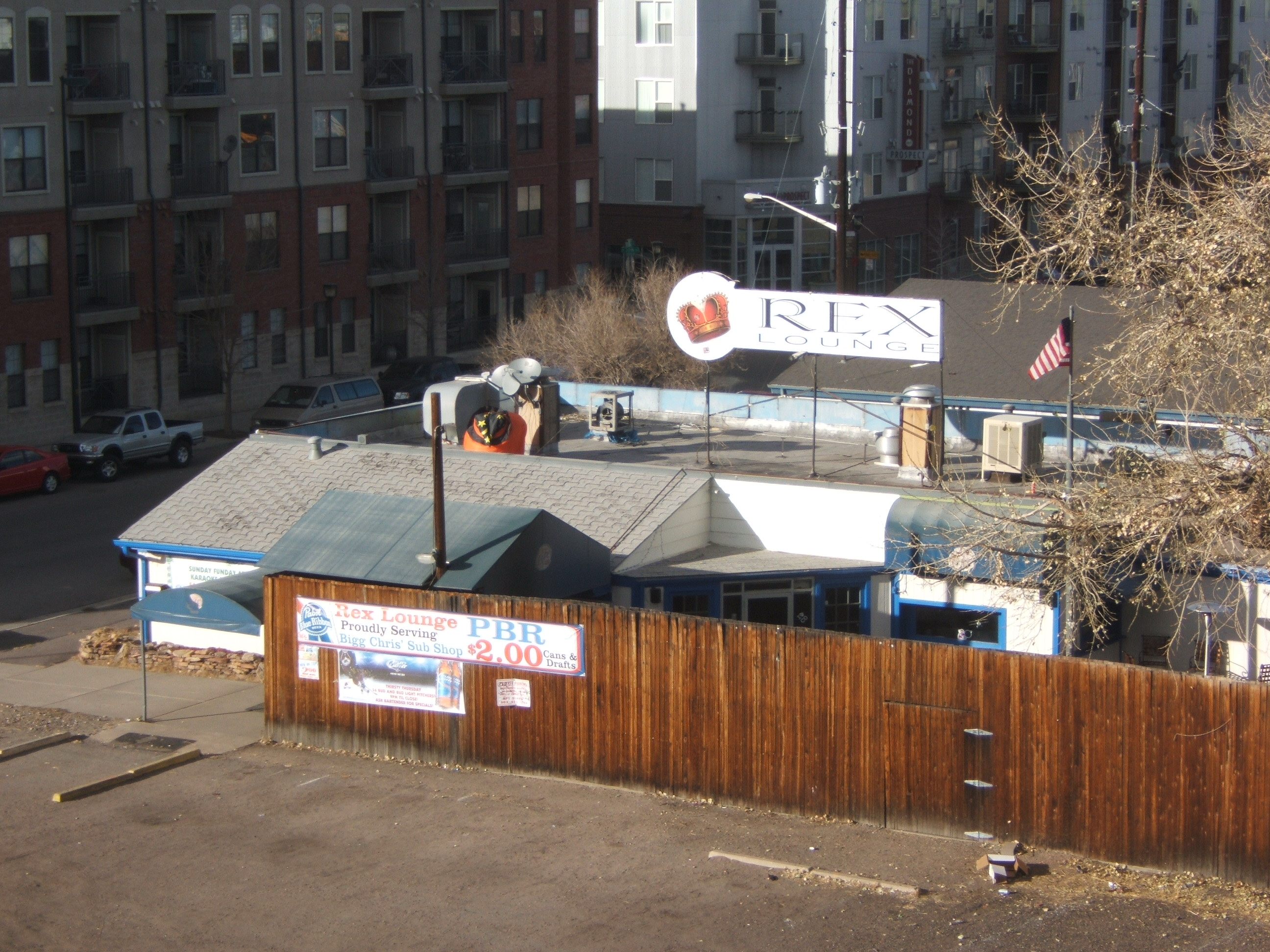
Rex Lounge, a dive bar that no longer exists. The Public Storage building stands there today.

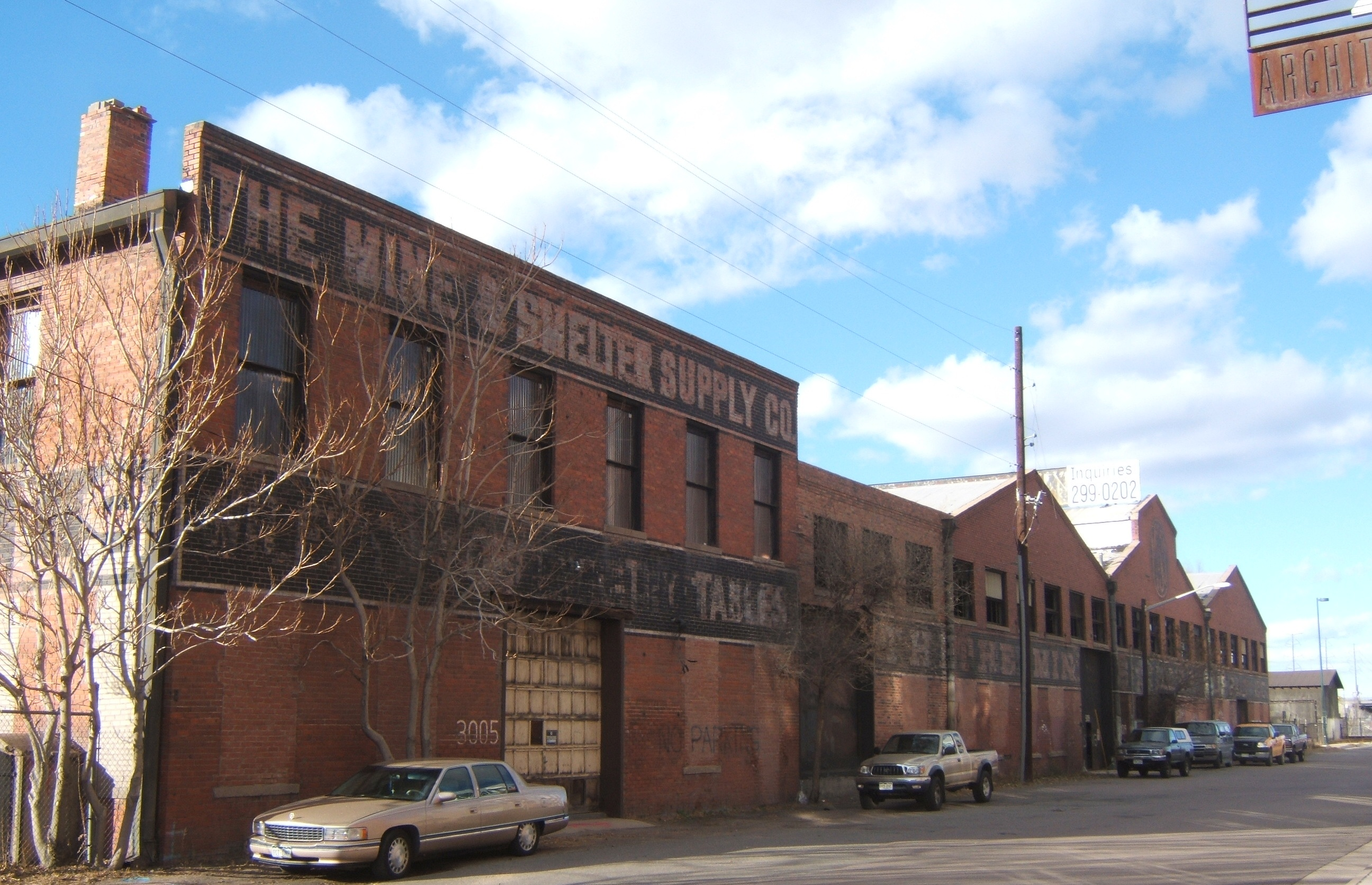
Warehouse that no longer exists which stood just west of the Jack Kerouac Lofts

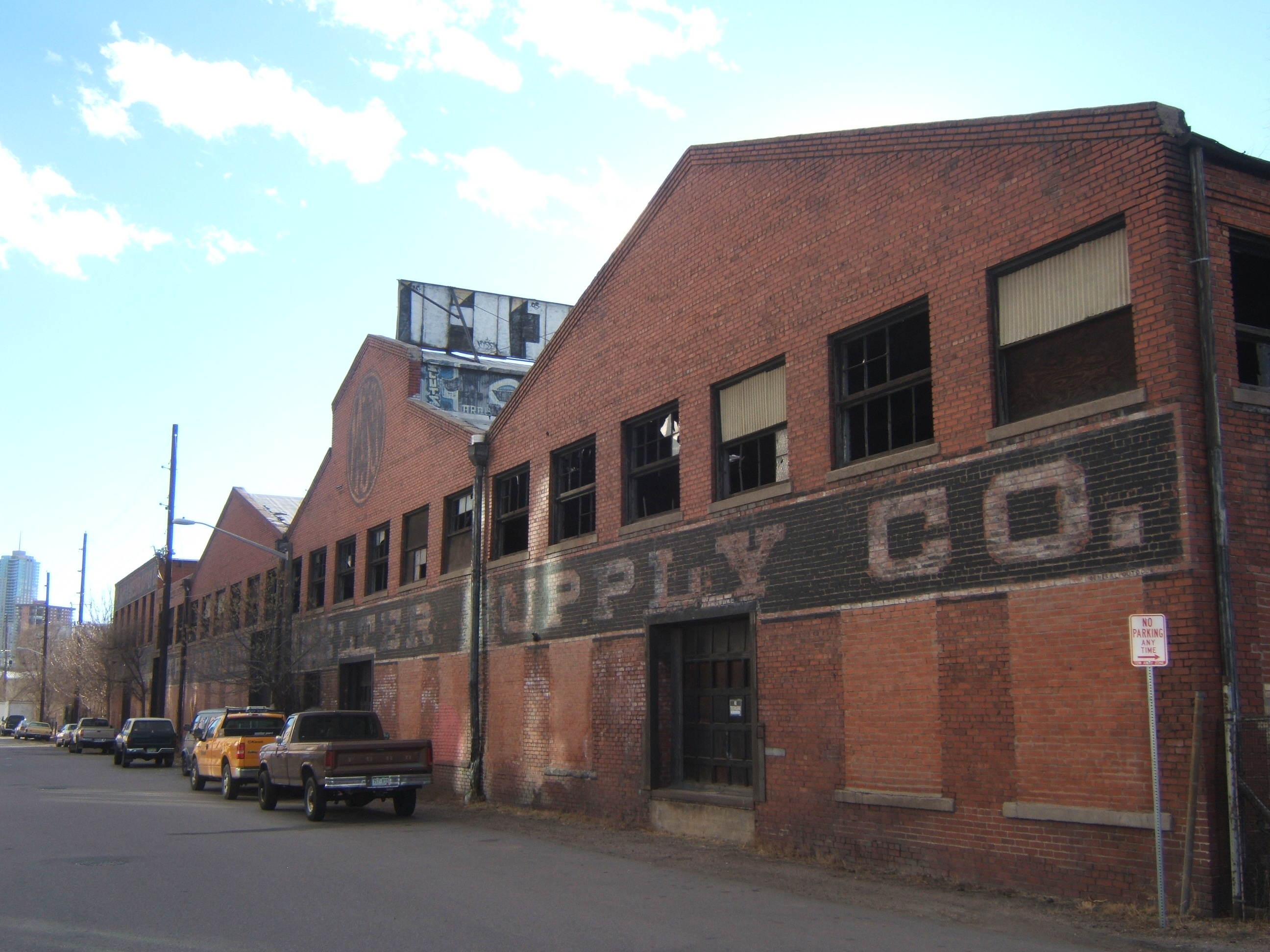
Warehouse that no longer exists which stood just west of the Jack Kerouac Lofts.

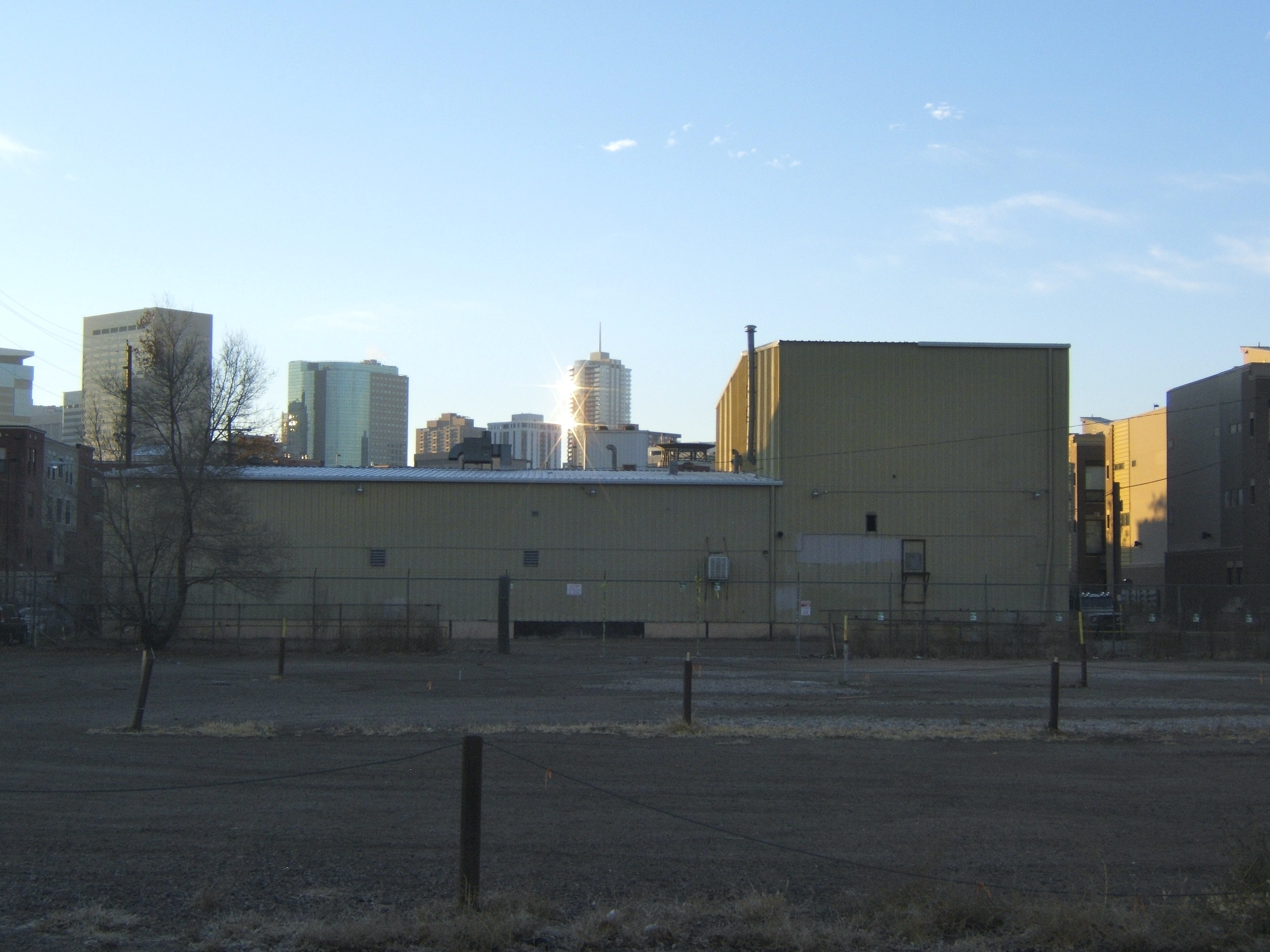
Empty warehouse just north of 2907 Huron Street. Later demolished for Griffis North Union.

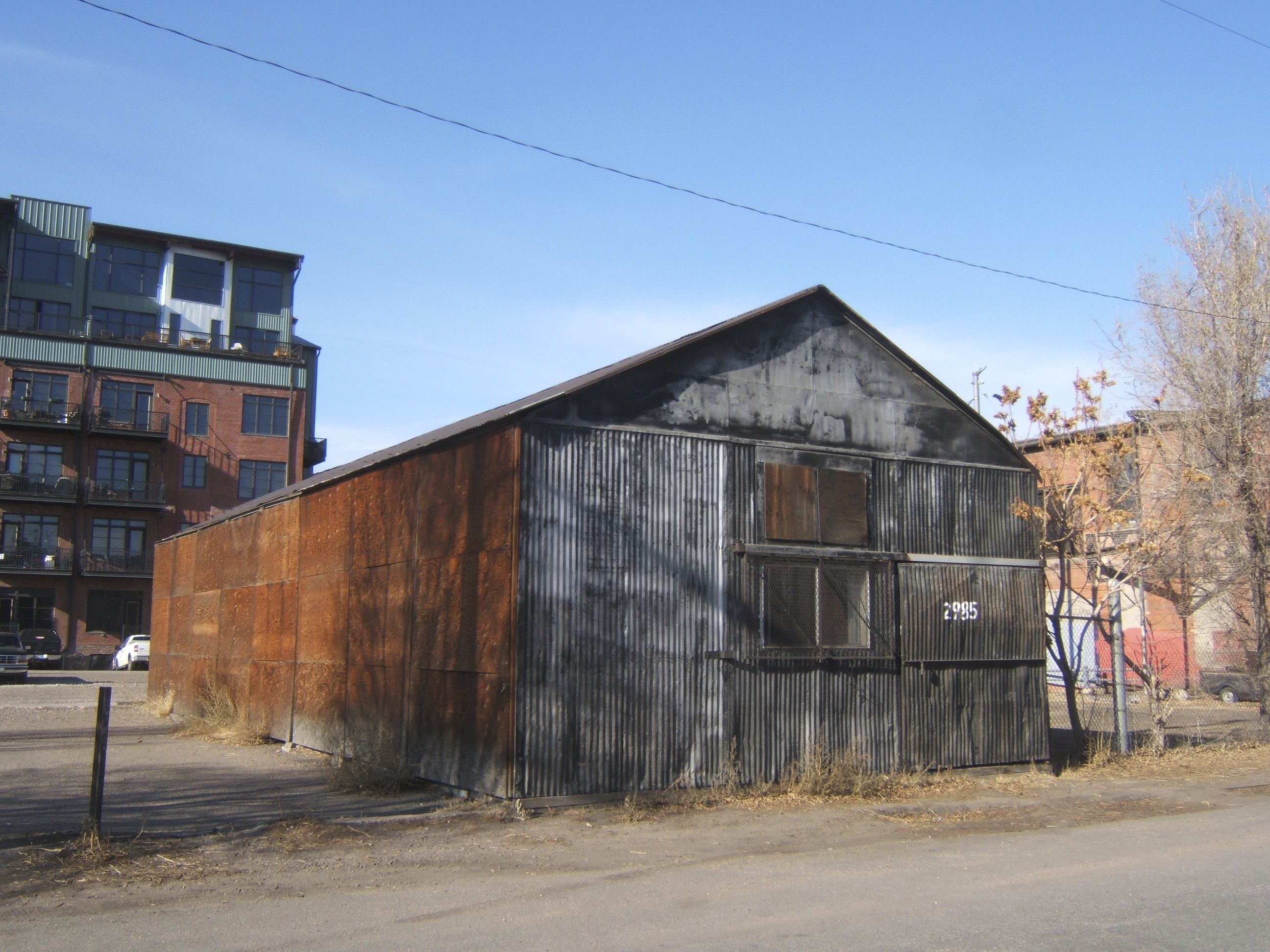
Empty warehouse, 2985 Huron Street, looking west. Later demolished for Griffis North Union.

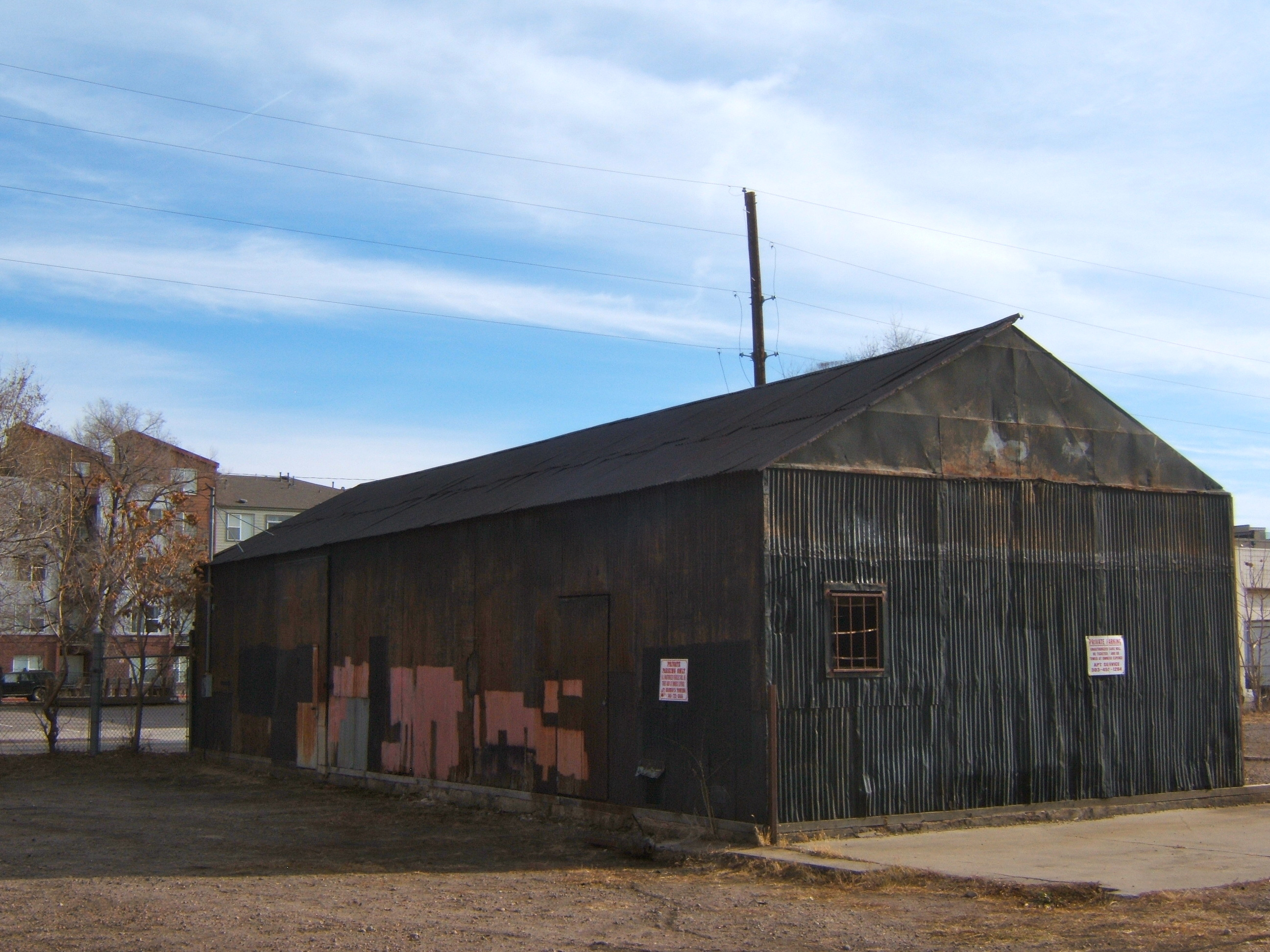
Empty warehouse, 2985 Huron Street, looking east. Later demolished for Griffis North Union.

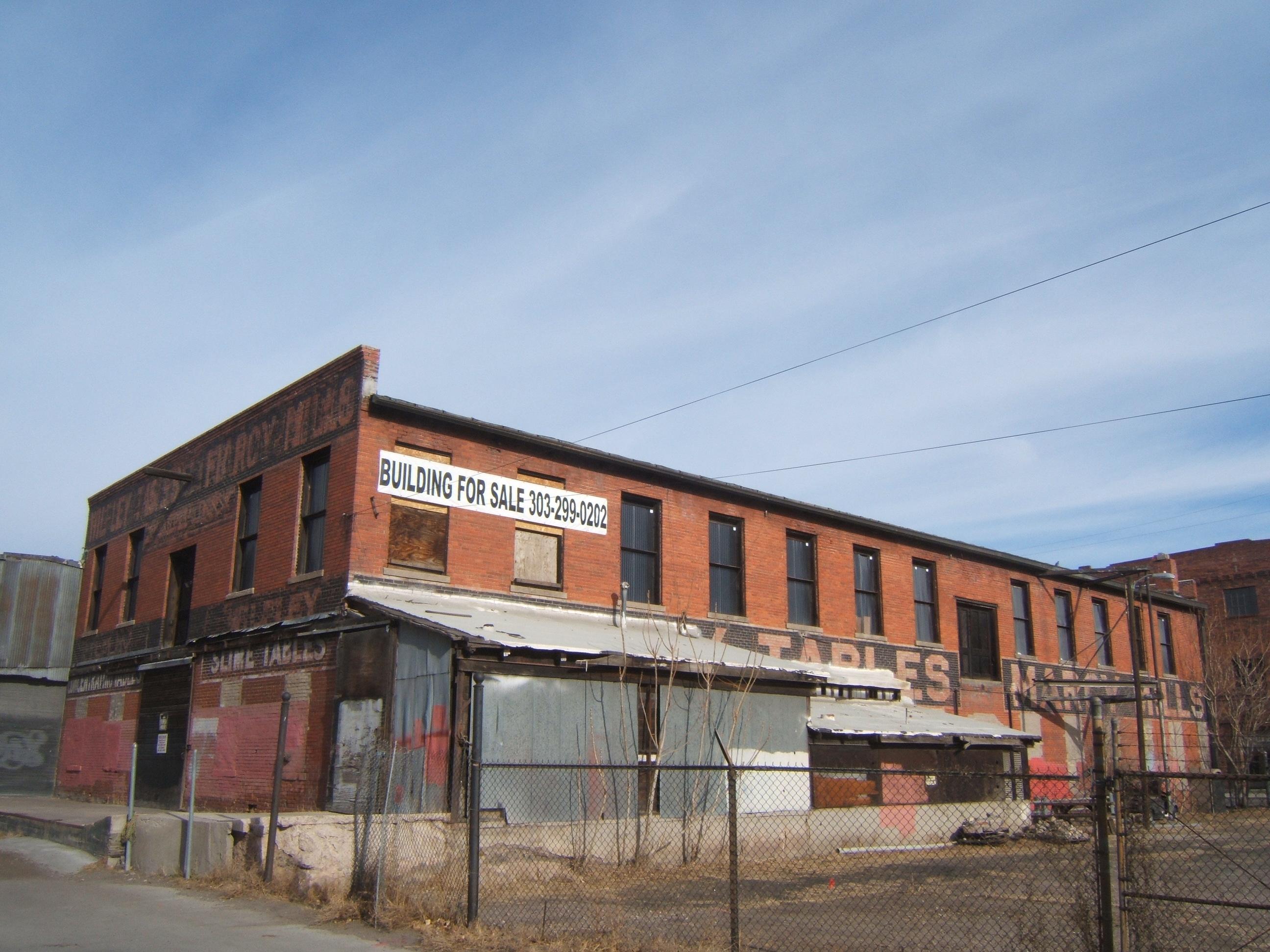
Warehouse that no longer exists which stood just west of the Jack Kerouac Lofts.

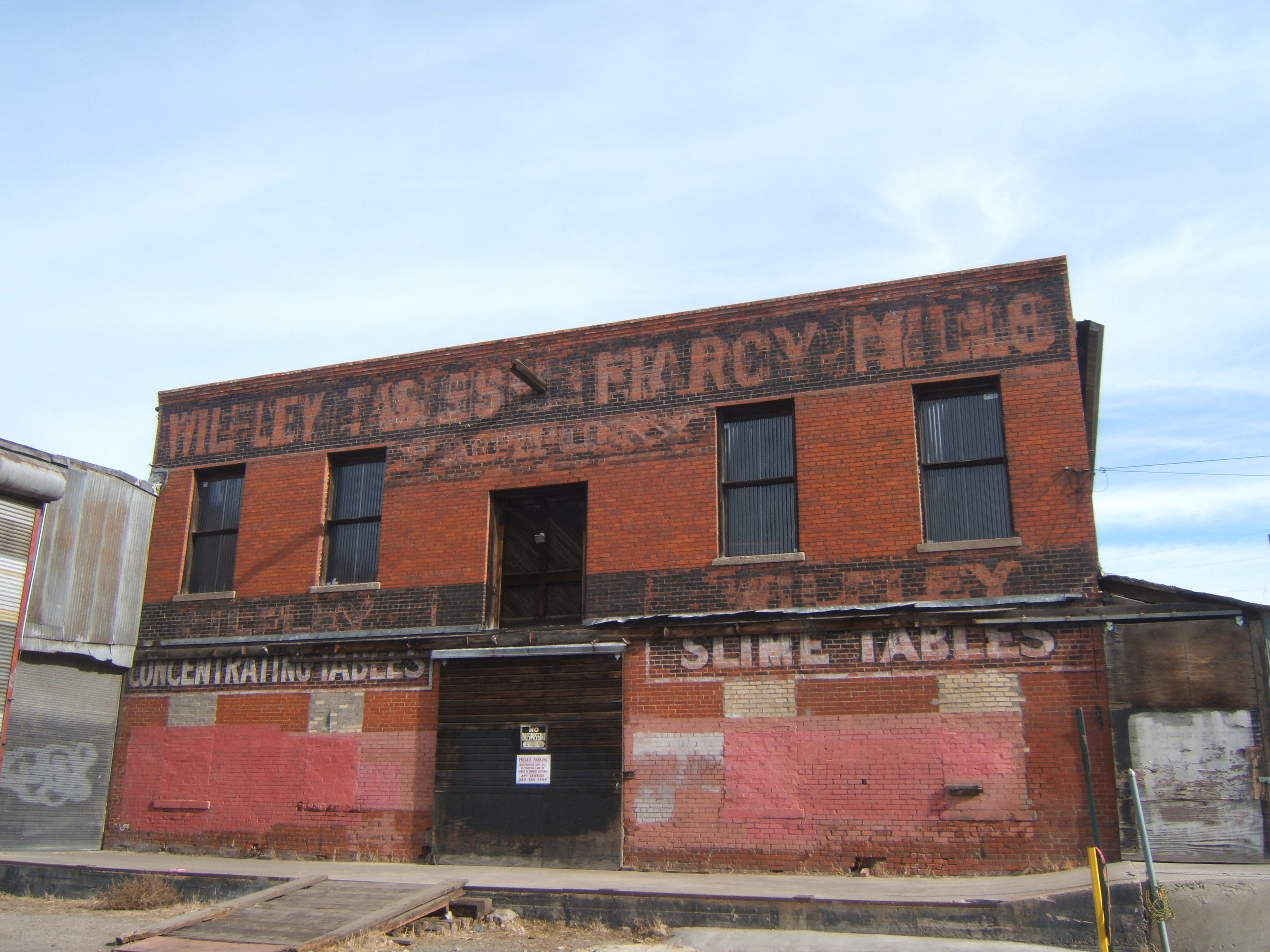
Warehouse that no longer exists which stood just west of the Jack Kerouac Lofts.

== Alphabetical list of Union Station North residential buildings ==
Key
† = to be determined

Name	Type	Address	Units	Year built	Stories	References
Ajax Lofts	Condominiums	2955 Inca Street	49	2003	4	
The Casey	Apartments	2100 Delgany Street	187	2015	6	
Diamond at Prospect	Apartments	3001 Fox Street	140	2005	4	
Flour Mill Lofts	Condominiums	2000 Little Raven Street	42	2000^{A}	10	
Griffis North Union	Apartments	2975 Huron Street	296	2016	5	
Griffis Union Station	Apartments	2905 Inca Street	400	2010	5	
Inca 29 Brownstones	Condominiums	2900 Inca Street	29	2007	3	
Jack Kerouac Lofts	Condominiums	3100 Huron Street	60	2005	4	
The Metro Apartments 1, 2, 3	Apartments	2121 Delgany Street	415	2004	4	
Watertower Lofts	Condominiums	2960 Inca Street	96	2002^{B}	5	
X Denver	Apartments	3100 Inca Street	251	2021	12	
3000 Huron	Apartments	3000 Huron Street	300	2023	13	
21st & Wewatta	Proposed	21st & Wewatta	180	†	12	
29th & Fox	Proposed	29th & Fox	124	†	12	
29th & Fox (South Corner)	Proposed	29th & Fox	120	†	12	
2099 Chestnut	Proposed	2099 Chestnut	77	†	8	

== Notes ==
A.Originally built as an industrial building in the 1920s and was later converted into a residential building in 2000.
B.Originally built as an industrial building in 1894 and was later converted into a residential building in 2002.
